= Chancellor =

Governmental office

Chancellor (Latin: cancellarius) is a title of various official positions in the governments of many countries. The original chancellors were the cancellarii of Roman courts of justice—ushers, who sat at the cancelli (lattice work screens) of a basilica (court hall), which separated the judge and counsel from the audience. A chancellor's office is called a chancellery or chancery. The word is now used in the titles of many various officers in various settings (government, education, religion). Nowadays, the term is most often used to describe:

- The head of the government
- A person in charge of foreign affairs
- A person with duties related to justice
- A person in charge of financial and economic issues
- The head of a university

== Governmental positions ==
=== Head of government ===
==== Austria ====
The chancellor of Austria (Bundeskanzler), is the head of the Government of Austria. Since 2025, the chancellor of Austria is Christian Stocker.

==== Germany ====
The chancellor of Germany (Bundeskanzler) is the head of government in Germany. In German politics, the Bundeskanzler is equivalent to a prime minister and is elected by the Bundestag ("Federal Diet", the directly elected federal parliament) every four years on the beginning of the electoral period after general elections. Between general elections, the chancellor (together with the whole cabinet) can only be removed from office by a konstruktives Misstrauensvotum (constructive vote of no confidence), which consists of the Bundestag electing a successor.

Since 2025, the chancellor of Germany is Friedrich Merz of the Christian Democratic Union of Germany (CDU).

The former German Empire, the Weimar Republic and Nazi Germany had the equivalent position of Reichskanzler as the head of the executive. Between 1871 and 1918, the Chancellor was appointed by the German Emperor. During the Weimar Republic (1919-1933), the chancellor was chosen by the president and stood under his authority. This continued (formally) during the first year of the Nazi regime until the death of President Paul von Hindenburg in 1934. Between 1934 and 1945, Adolf Hitler combined the roles of head of state, head of government and leader of the ruling party, being officially titled "Führer und Reichskanzler" (literally "Leader and Imperial Chancellor").

==== Switzerland ====
===== Swiss Confederation =====
In Switzerland, the chancellor (German: Bundeskanzler; French: Chancelier fédéral; Italian: Cancelliere della Confederazione) is not the political head of government, but rather its chief administrator as the chief of staff of the Swiss Federal Government. The officeholder is elected by the Swiss Federal Assembly (German: Bundesversammlung; French: Assemblée fédérale; Italian: Assemblea federale) to head the Federal Chancellery (German: Bundeskanzlei; French: Chancellerie fédérale; Italian: Cancelleria federale) — the general staff of the seven-member executive Federal Council, the Swiss federal government. The chancellor participates in the meetings of the seven federal councilors with a consultative vote and prepares the reports on policy and activities of the council to parliament (assembly). The chancellery is responsible for the publication of all federal laws.

===== Swiss cantons =====
In most Swiss cantons there is a state chancellor who heads the central administrative unit of the cantonal government. In the Canton of Geneva, the first documents attesting to the existence of a chancellor go back to the 12th century. In the 16th century the chancery is officially described as the permanent secretariat of the executive and legislature. The first of these functions still constitutes an important part of its activities in Geneva and other cantons. In the canton of Bern, the chancellor is elected by the Grand Council (i.e. Parliament) and has the task of supporting the Grand Council and the Executive Council in carrying out their tasks. The chancellor directs the staff of the Executive Council, supports the president of the Government and the Executive Council in the performance of their duties, and usually participates as an advisor to the president of the Grand Council in Grand Council sessions.

=== Foreign minister and diplomatic official ===
In most countries of Latin America, the equivalents to "chancellor" (Canciller in Spanish and Chanceler in Portuguese) are commonly used to refer to the post of foreign minister. It is often used as a synonym to the full titles of the ministers of foreign affairs. Likewise, the ministry of foreign affairs in Spanish-speaking countries in the Americas is referred to as the Cancillería or in Portuguese-speaking Brazil as Chancelaria. However, in Spain the term canciller refers to a civil servant in the Spanish diplomatic service responsible for technical issues relating to foreign affairs. As to the German foreign service, the term Kanzler (chancellor) refers to the administrative head of a diplomatic mission.

=== Functions related to justice and the law ===
==== Finland ====
In Finland the chancellor of justice (Finnish: oikeuskansleri, Swedish: justitiekanslern) supervises the legality of actions taken by the government and monitors the implementation of basic civil liberties. In this special function the chancellor also sits in the Finnish Cabinet, the Finnish Council of State.

==== Sweden ====
In Sweden the chancellor of justice or Justitiekanslern acts as the Solicitor General for the Swedish Government. The office was introduced by King Charles XII in 1713. Historically there was also a lord high chancellor or Rikskansler as the most senior member of the Privy Council of Sweden. There is in addition to this a University Chancellor or Universitetskansler, who leads the National Agency for Higher Education.

==== United Kingdom ====
In the legal system of the United Kingdom, the term can refer to these officials:

- Chancellor of the Exchequer, the finance minister. As one of the Great Officers of State, the Chancellor is generally seen as second only to the prime minister in political potency. The title dates back to the Kingdom of England. When the term chancellor is used in British politics, it almost always refers to the chancellor of the exchequer. As Second Lord of the Treasury, the chancellor has an official residence at 11 Downing Street, next door to the prime minister, at 10 Downing Street, in London.
- Lord Chancellor (Lord High Chancellor, King's Chancellor) is one of the oldest offices of state, dating back to the Kingdom of England, and older than Parliament itself. Theoretically, the lord chancellor is the chancellor of Great Britain. The former office of Lord Chancellor of Ireland was abolished in 1922, when all but Northern Ireland left the United Kingdom. The lord chancellor is the ceremonially second-highest-ranking non-royal subject in precedence (after the archbishop of Canterbury). In addition to the now primarily ceremonial duties as chancellor, the office is now invariably held by the secretary of state for justice, who is the political head of the Ministry of Justice. Previously, the chancellor also held the roles of:
  - Head of the English, but not Scottish, judiciary. In previous centuries, the lord chancellor was the sole judge in the Court of Chancery; when, in 1873, that court was combined with others to form the High Court, the lord chancellor became the nominal head of the Chancery Division. The lord chancellor was permitted to participate in judicial sittings of the House of Lords; he also chose the committees that heard appeals in the Lords. The de facto head of the Chancery Division was the vice-chancellor, and the role of choosing appellate committees was in practice fulfilled by the Senior Lord of Appeal in Ordinary.
  - Speaker of the House of Lords. These duties are now undertaken by the lord speaker. Jack Straw was the first lord chancellor to be a member of the House of Commons, rather than the House of Lords or its predecessor, the Curia Regis, since Sir Christopher Hatton in 1578.
- The chancellor of the High Court is the head of the Chancery Division of the High Court of Justice. Before 2005, the judge occupying this position was known as the vice-chancellor, the lord chancellor being the nominal head of the Division.
- In a county palatine or liberty, where a local lord exercised personal jurisdiction that elsewhere was reserved to the Crown, the head of the lord's administration was often titled "chancellor". Where the lord was a bishop (as with the bishop of Ely in Isle of Ely or the archbishop of York in Hexhamshire) then this officer was called the temporal chancellor to distinguish him from the bishop's ecclesiastical chancellor. While palatine and liberty jurisdictions are practically obsolete, the ceremonial title chancellor remains in use:
  - Chancellor of the Duchy of Lancaster: in effect, as the sinecure position of a minister without portfolio, often given to senior politicians so they have a seat in the cabinet.
  - Chancellor of Cornwall, keeper of the Great Seal, second only to the lord warden of the Stannaries within the Duchy of Cornwall.

==== Some states in the United States ====
Some U.S. states, like Delaware, Tennessee, and Mississippi, still maintain a separate Court of Chancery with jurisdiction over equity cases. Judges who sit on those courts are called chancellors.

=== Other governmental positions ===
==== Denmark ====
In Denmark, the office of chancellor (or royal chancellor) seems to have appeared in the 12th century, and until 1660 it was the title of the leader of the state administration (a kind of a "Home Office" but often with foreign political duties). Often he appeared to be the real leader of the government. From 1660 until 1848, the title continued as "Grand Chancellor" or "President of the Danish Chancellery", and was replaced in 1730 by the title "Minister of Domestic Affairs".

==== Estonia ====
In Estonia, a chancellor (kantsler) directs the work of a ministry and coordinates institutions subject to the ministry. A ministry can also have one or several vice-chancellors (asekantsler), who fulfill the duties of the chancellor, when they are absent. The chancellor of justice (Õiguskantsler, currently Ülle Madise) supervises the legality of actions taken by the government and monitors the implementation of basic civil liberties.

== Non-governmental positions ==
=== France ===
In France, the chancellor of the Institut de France (French: chancelier de l'Institut de France) is elected for a renewable 3-year term by the Institut's central administrative committee among its members. The officeholder has to then be confirmed by the President of France. The officeholder is responsible for the administration of the Institut and the implementation of the committee's decisions.

=== United States ===
In the United States, the only "chancellor" established by the federal government is the Chancellor of the Smithsonian Institution, a largely ceremonial office held by the chief justice of the United States. As the Smithsonian is a research and museum system, its use of the title is perhaps best thought of as akin to a university's chancellor.

== Ecclesiastical position ==
The chancellor is the principal record-keeper of a diocese or eparchy, or their equivalent. The chancellor is a notary, so that he may certify official documents, and often has other duties at the discretion of the bishop of the diocese: he may be in charge of some aspect of finances or of managing the personnel connected with diocesan offices, although his delegated authority cannot extend to vicars of the diocesan bishop, such as vicars general, episcopal vicars or judicial vicars. His office is within the "chancery". Vice-chancellors may be appointed to assist the chancellor in busy chanceries. Normally, the chancellor is a priest or deacon, although in some circumstances a layperson may be appointed to the post. In the eparchial curia a chancellor is to be appointed who is to be a presbyter (priest) or deacon and whose principal obligation, unless otherwise established by the particular law, is to see that the acts of the curia are gathered and arranged as well as preserved in the archives of the eparchial curia.

In England, the Consistory courts of the Church of England are each presided over by a chancellor of the diocese.

In the United Methodist Church, each annual conference has a conference chancellor, who is the annual conference's legal adviser and representative. While the annual conference usually hires outside professional counsel in matters that require legal representation, that hiring and representation is done under the supervision, and with the consent, of the conference chancellor.

== Educational position ==
A chancellor is the leader, either ceremonial or executive, of many public and private universities and related institutions.

The heads of the New York City Department of Education and the District of Columbia Public Schools, who run the municipally-operated public schools in those jurisdictions, carry the title of Chancellor. New York State also has a Chancellor of the University of the State of New York, the body that licenses and regulates all educational and research institutions in the state and many professions (not to be confused with the State University of New York, an actual institution of higher learning).

In a few instances, the term chancellor applies to a student or faculty member in a high school or an institution of higher learning who is either appointed or elected as chancellor to preside on the highest ranking judicial board or tribunal. They handle non-academic matters such as violations of behavior.

In Germany many heads of university administration carry the title Kanzler (Chancellor) while the academical heads carry the title Rektor (Rector). In order to avoid any misunderstanding, the head of the German Federal Government is therefore usually called by the official title Bundeskanzler (Federal Chancellor).

== Historical uses ==
- Chancellor or Grand Chancellor is the common translation of the Chinese title zǎixiàng (Chinese: 宰相), or chéngxiàng (丞相), which in imperial China was the highest-ranking executive official serving under the emperor. See also: Chancellor of the Tang dynasty.
- The Daijō-daijin or Dajō-daijin (太政大臣; "Chancellor of the Realm") was the head of the Daijō-kan (Great Council of State) during and after the Nara period and briefly under the Meiji Constitution.
- The chancellor in the government of the Holy Roman Empire.
- There are two ancient Egyptian titles sometimes translated as chancellor.
  - The "royal sealer" (xtmtj-bity or xtmw-bity), a title which conveyed a certain rank at the royal court, attested since the First Dynasty (about 3000 BC). People holding the post include Imhotep and Hemaka.
  - The "Keeper of the Royal Seal" (or overseer of the seal or treasurer—imy-r xtmt) was responsible for the state's income. This position appears around 2000 BC. Officials holding the post include Bay or Irsu, Khety Meketre, and Nakhti.
- For centuries, the King of France appointed the Chancellor of France (French: Chancelier de France), a Great Officer of the Crown, as an office associated with that of keeper of the seals. The chancelier was responsible for some judicial proceedings. During the reigns of Louis XVIII, Charles X and Louis Philippe I, the Chancellor of France presided over the Chamber of Peers, the upper house of the royal French parliament.
- In the Kingdom of Poland from the 14th century, there was a royal chancellor (Kanclerz). In the Polish–Lithuanian Commonwealth (1569–1795), the four chancellors were among the ten highest officials of the state. Poland and Lithuania each had a Grand Chancellor and a Deputy Chancellor, each entitled to a senatorial seat, responsible for the affairs of the whole Kingdom, each with his own chancery. See Offices in the Polish–Lithuanian Commonwealth.
- The chancellor was the highest non-hereditary rank in the government of the Duchy of Burgundy.
- In the Russian Empire, the chancellor was the highest rank of civil service as defined by the Table of Ranks and on the same grade as field marshal and General Admiral. Only the most distinguished government officials were promoted to this grade, such as foreign ministers Alexander Gorchakov and Alexey Bestuzhev-Ryumin.
- In Norway the Chancellor of Norway (modern Norwegian: Norges rikes kansler, "Chancellor of Norway's Realm") was the most important aide of the King of Norway during the Middle Ages. He issued laws and regulations, and was responsible for day-to-day administration of the kingdom. From 1270, the Chancellor resided in Bergen. Haakon V of Norway moved the Chancellor's residence to Oslo; on 31 August 1314 the provost of St Mary's Church became Chancellor on a permanent basis. He was given the Great Seal of the Realm "for eternity." The Chancellors were originally chosen from the clergy. The position lost its importance after Jens Bjelke's tenure, and was abolished in 1679.
- The Lord Chancellor of Scotland.
- The canghellor of medieval Wales administered the peasantry of the king's demesne and was charged with holding the king's pleas and "waste".
- A "State Chancellor" (German: Staatskanzler) was head of government in German-Austria after World War I and again after World War II in post-war Austria. Both times the State Chancellor was Karl Renner.

== See also ==
- Logothete
- Prime minister
