= Norwegian battle axe =

Weapon

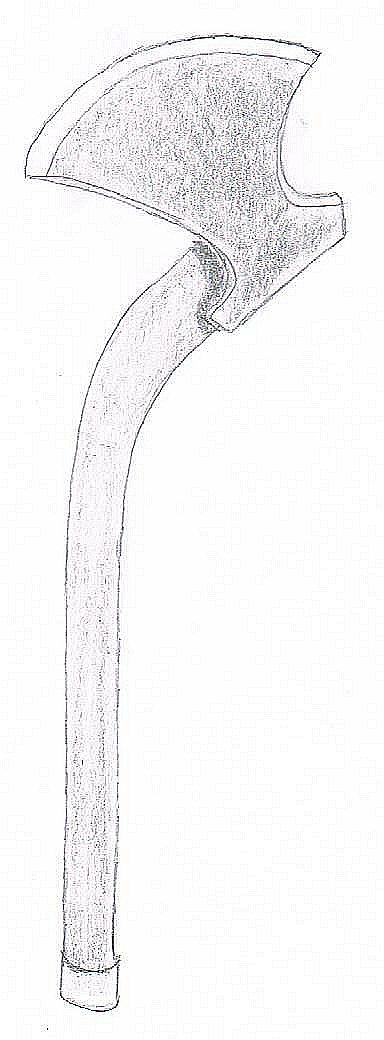
A Norwegian peasant axe.

The Norwegian battle axe, also called Norwegian peasant militia axe, Norwegian peasant axe or peasant battle axe (Norwegian: bondeøks or bondestridsøks), is a tool and weapon from Norway, which was an important part of the Norwegian national defense in the 1600s.

== Description ==
The axe has great symbolic worth in Scandinavia, and appears in the coat of arms of Norway and as a symbol of Saint Olav, the patron saint and eternal King of Norway. The peasant axe has a mostly straight shaft with a distinct curve towards the blade. The blade is crescent-shaped blade and single-edged. It is assumed that the axe is a further development of the Viking axe, also known as the Danish axe. The shape of the shaft favors a cutting effect from the blade. Peasant axes were often highly decorated and had a high status in the Norwegian culture as a symbol of the free farmer.

== Gallery ==
The coat of arms of Telemark county showing a rising peasant axe.

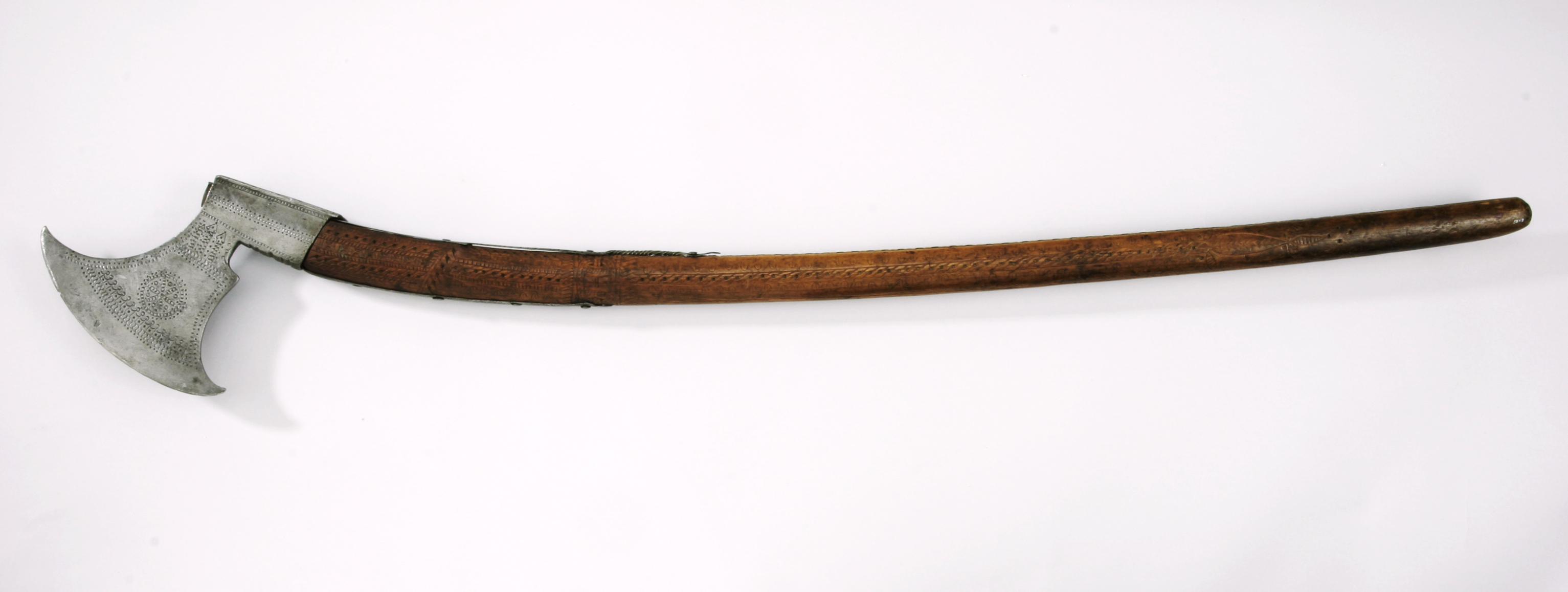
Norwegian axe from Gudbrandsdalen, ca. 1654

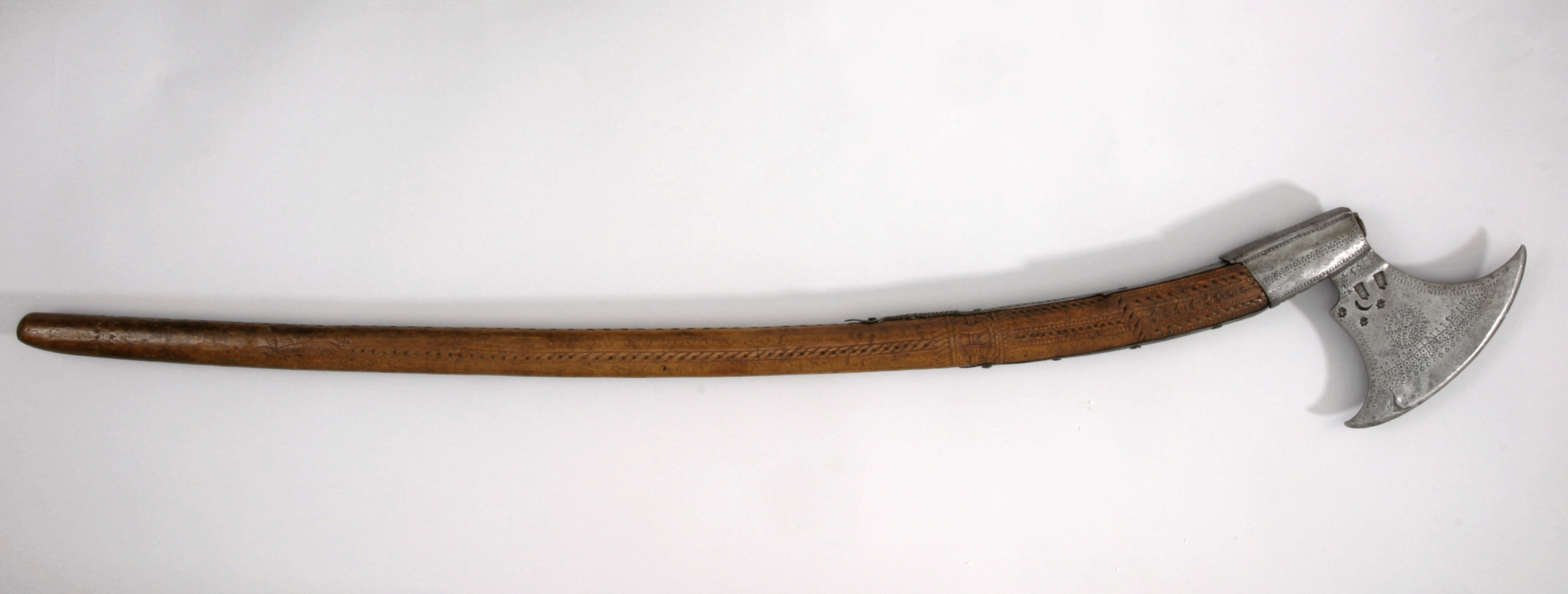

== See also ==
- Dane axe
- Shepherd's axe
- Bearded axe
- Pike pole
