= Great Seal of the Realm (Norway) =

Great seal used by Monarchs in Norway

The Great Seal of the Realm (Norwegian: Riksseglet) is the state seal of the Kingdom of Norway.

The two oldest known Norwegian royal seals are Inge Krokrygg's and Sverre's, both from the second half of the 12th century. As in other countries, the royal seal in Norway was kept and administered by the chancellor.

This office existed in Norway from the 13th century until the death of the last chancellor, Johan Frederik von Marschalck, in 1679. After 1814, the Norwegian royal seal was kept by the secretary of state.

Since 1970, the national seal has been kept at the Prime Minister's Office; it is placed on documents that are considered by the Cabinet.

Since 1814, the Norwegian national seal has been embossed into government documents by four manual stamping presses before the electric press that has been in use since the 1990s.

When the Storting on 7 June 1905 determined that the union with Sweden had been dissolved and Oscar II had ceased to be King of Norway, the government was simultaneously given the authority to exercise the King's authority.

The physical expression of the monarch's authority was his signature in the minutes of matters discussed in the Council of State. The King's signature made the decisions royal resolutions.

For certain types of resolutions, a special document was also drawn up in the King's name. This particularly applied to legal provisions and official appointments. Such documents were provided with an impression of the State Seal in addition to the King's signature. The main motif of the State Seal was the Royal Coat of Arms, and around it was the King's name and title.

== Seal presses ==
There have been a total of five documented seal presses in Norway since 1814.

=== National Seal Press 1 ===
The first Norwegian national seal press after the dissolution of the Danish-Norwegian kingdom on 14 January 1814 was put into use sometime after 2 March 1814.

=== National Seal Press 2 ===
The Royal Seal Press 2 is the one that has been used the longest. It was purchased in London in the summer of 1840 for 35 specidales and 62 shillings.

It was Commander Captain Ole W. Erichsen who was commissioned to purchase the national seal press 2, since he was in England in the summer of 1840 to have a steam engine installed in the navy's new ship Nordcap

The 1840 press may have been stored in the basement of the Government Building after it was replaced, probably in late 1939, after nearly 100 years of use. Its whereabouts are unknown today.

=== National Seal Press 3 ===
The Royal Seal Press 3 was ordered in Berlin by the engraver and medalist firm H. Rui at Underhaugsveien 9 in late February 1939, and was probably put into use late that year.

The reason was that the national coat of arms itself had been redesigned in 1937 by the National Archives' heraldist Hallvard Trætteberg, so that there was now a need for a new version of King Haakon VII's national seal. The same Trætteberg had late in 1937 submitted a draft for a new national seal with a diameter of 70 cm, which the national seal press 2 could not handle.

After King Haakon and the Ministry of Foreign Affairs had approved Trætteberg's draft for a new national seal in late 1938, the State Secretariat ordered a new national seal stamp and a new national seal press from engraver and medallist H. Rui in early January 1939.

When the Prime Minister's Office acquired National Seal Press 4, probably sometime in the 1960s, Press 3 was put into storage in the basement of Block Y. It is not known where this press is now located.

=== National Seal Press 4 ===
The Royal Seal Press 4 was considerably simpler than the Royal Seal Press 3, with a lever arm and no screw. It was not depicted until it was taken out of service in the early 1990s, in favor of the electric press – the Royal Seal Press 5 – which is still in use.

National Seal Press 4 was also placed in storage in the basement of Block Y. Its current location is unknown.

=== National Seal Press 5 ===
Royal Seal Press 5, the first to be electrically powered, in the Prime Minister's Office premises at Akershus Fortress.
