= Battle axe =

Axe specifically designed for combat

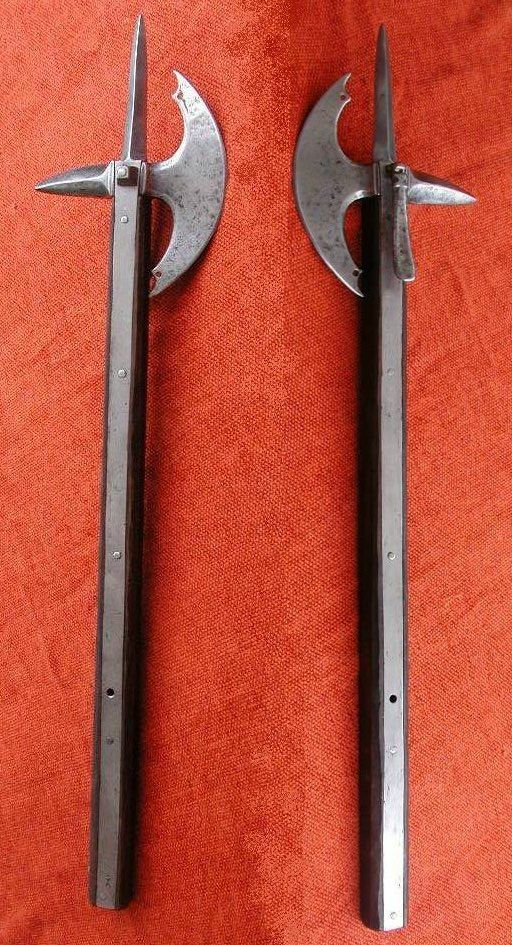
Horseman's axe, circa 1475. The blade's punched decoration suggests German make. This is an example of a battle axe that was tailored for the use of a mounted knight. The wooden haft is modern.

A battle axe (also battle-axe, battle ax, or battle-ax) is an axe specifically designed for combat. Battle axes were designed differently to utility axes, with blades more akin to cleavers than to wood axes. Many were suitable for use in one hand, while others were larger and were deployed two-handed.

Axes designed for warfare ranged in weight from just over 0.5 to 3 kg (1 to 7 lb), and in length from just over 30 cm (1 ft) to upwards of 150 cm (5 ft), as in the case of the Danish axe or the sparth axe. Cleaving weapons longer than 150 cm (5 ft) would arguably fall into the category of polearms.

== Overview ==
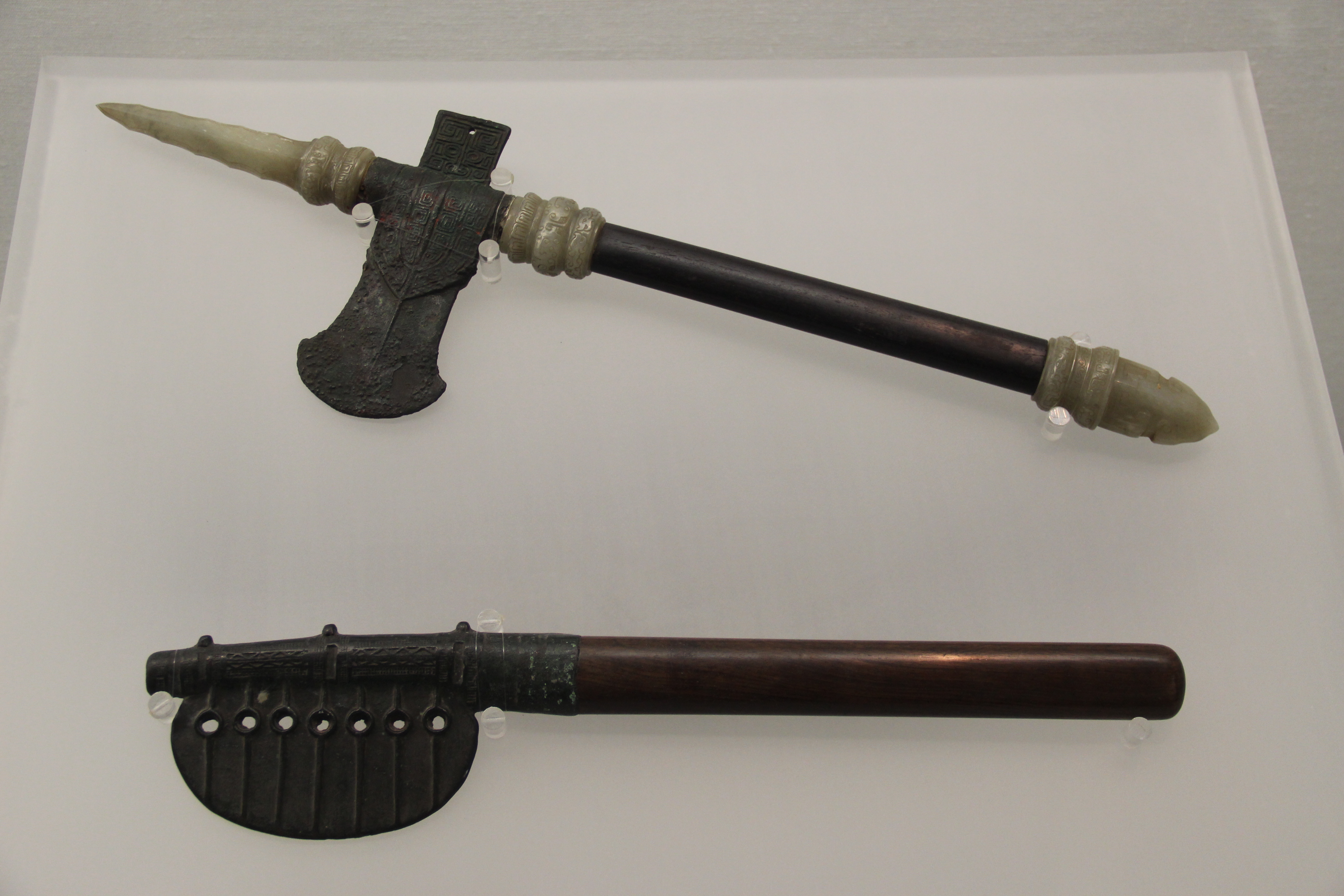
Bronze axes, Zhou dynasty

Through the course of human history, commonplace objects have been pressed into service as weapons. Axes, by virtue of their ubiquity, are no exception. Besides axes designed for combat, there were many battle axes that doubled as tools. Axes could be modified into deadly projectiles as well (see the francisca for an example). Axes were often cheaper than swords and considerably more available.

Battle axes generally weigh far less than modern splitting axes, especially mauls, because they were designed to cut legs and arms rather than wood; consequently, slightly narrow slicing blades are the norm. This facilitates deep, devastating wounds. Moreover, a lighter weapon is much quicker to bring to bear in combat and manipulate for repeated strikes against an adversary.

The crescent-shaped heads of European battle axes of the Roman and post-Roman periods were usually made of wrought iron with a carbon steel edge or, as time elapsed across the many centuries of the medieval era, steel. The hardwood handles of military axes came to be reinforced with metal bands called langets, so that an enemy warrior could not cut the shaft. Some later specimens had all-metal handles.

Battle axes are particularly associated in Western popular imagination with the Vikings. Certainly, Scandinavian foot soldiers and maritime marauders employed them as a stock weapon during their heyday, which extended from the beginning of the 8th century to the end of the 11th century. They produced several varieties, including specialized throwing axes (see francisca) and "bearded" axes or "skeggox" (so named for their trailing lower blade edge which increased cleaving power and could be used to catch the edge of an opponent's shield and pull it down, leaving the shield-bearer vulnerable to a follow-up blow). Viking axes may have been wielded with one hand or two, depending on the length of the plain wooden haft. See Viking Age arms and armor.

== History ==
=== Europe ===
==== Prehistory and the Ancient Mediterranean ====
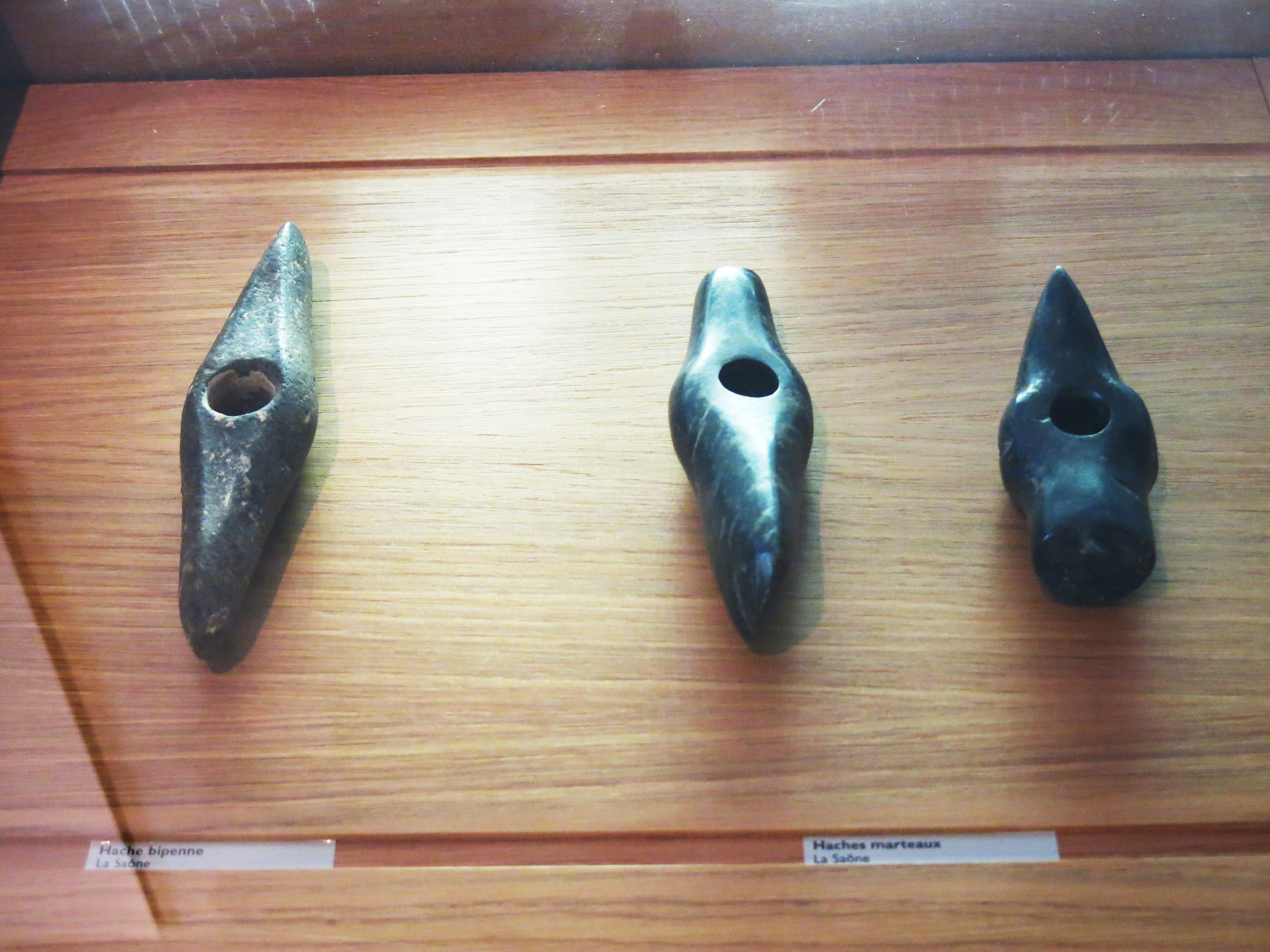
Stone axe heads in polished greenstone from the collections of the Hôtel-Dieu in Tournus (Saône-et-Loire, France). Found in Saône River

Stone hand axes were in use in the Paleolithic period for hundreds of thousands of years. The first hafted stone axes appear to have been produced about 6000 BC during the Mesolithic period. Technological development continued in the Neolithic period with the much wider usage of hard stones in addition to flint and chert and the widespread use of polishing to improve axe properties. The axes proved critical in wood working and became cult objects (for example, the entry for the Battle-axe people of Scandinavia, treated their axes as high-status cultural objects). Such stone axes were made from a wide variety of tough rocks such as picrite and other igneous or metamorphic rocks, and were widespread in the Neolithic period. Many axe heads found were probably used primarily as mauls to split wood beams, and as sledgehammers for construction purposes (such hammering stakes into the ground, for example).

Narrow axe heads made of cast metals were subsequently manufactured by artisans in the Middle East and then Europe during the Copper Age and the Bronze Age. The earliest specimens were socket-less.

More specifically, bronze battle-axe heads are attested in the archaeological record from ancient China and the New Kingdom of ancient Egypt. Some of them were suited for practical use as infantry weapons while others were clearly intended to be brandished as symbols of status and authority, judging by the quality of their decoration.

The epsilon axe was widely used during the Bronze Age by irregular infantry unable to afford better weapons. Its use was limited to Europe and the Middle East.

In the eastern Mediterranean Basin during the Iron Age, the double-bladed labrys axe was prevalent, and a hafted, single-bitted axe made of bronze or later iron was sometimes used as a weapon of war by the heavy infantry of ancient Greece, especially when confronted with thickly-armored opponents. The sagaris—described as either single bitted or double bitted—became associated by the Greeks with the mythological Amazons, though these were generally ceremonial axes rather than practical implements.

The Barbarian tribes that the Romans encountered north of the Alps did include iron war axes in their armories, alongside swords and spears. The Cantabri from the Iberian peninsula also used battle axes.

==== The Middle Ages ====
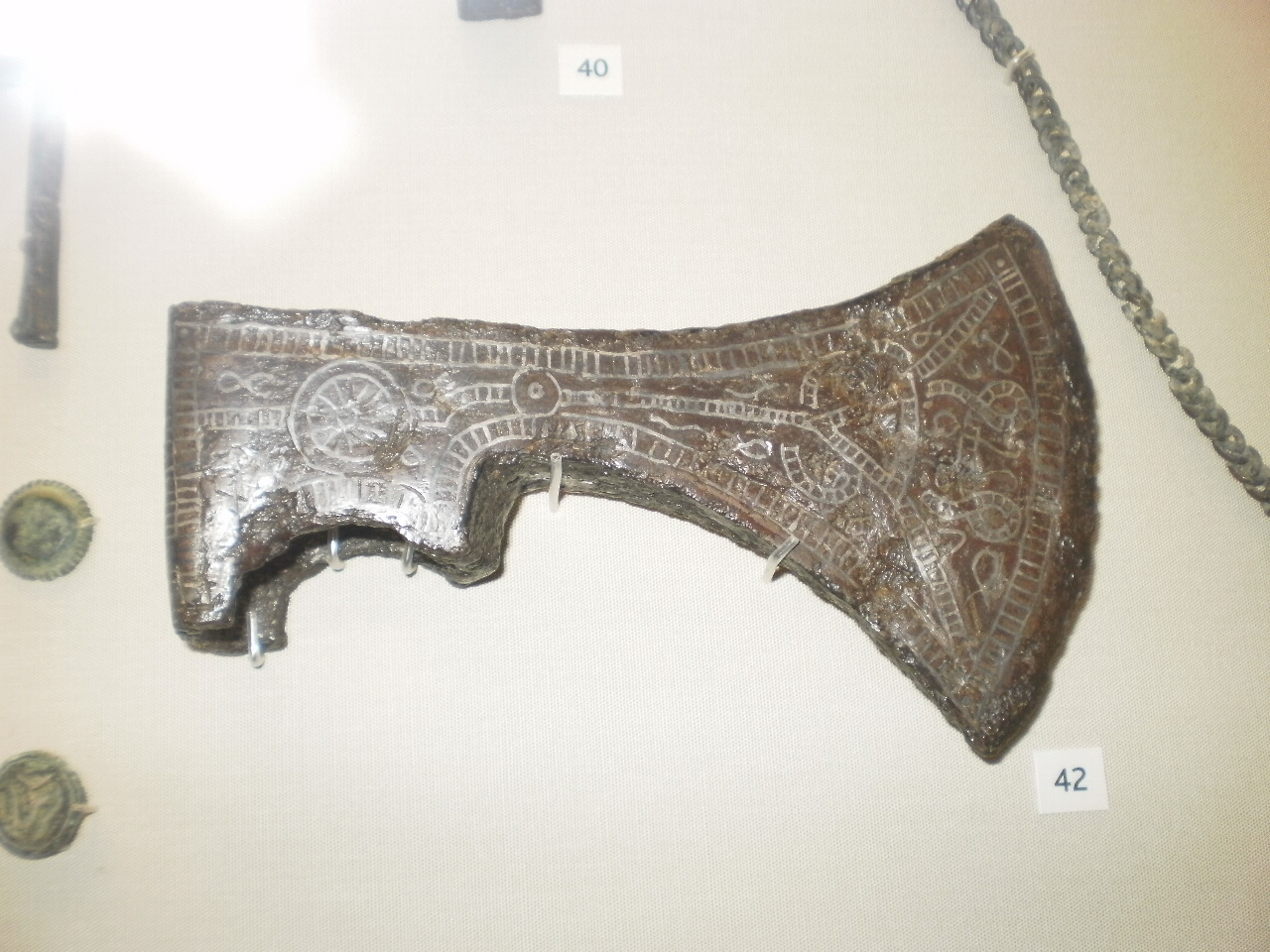
An ornamented, 7th-century Merovingian battle axe head on display in the British Museum.

Battle axes were very common in Europe in the Migration Period and the subsequent Viking Age, and they famously figure on the 11th-century Bayeux Tapestry, which depicts Norman mounted knights pitted against Anglo-Saxon infantrymen. They continued to be employed throughout the rest of the Middle Ages, with significant combatants being noted axe wielders in the 12th, 13th, and 14th centuries.

King Stephen of England famously used a 'Dane axe' at the Battle of Lincoln 1141. One account says that he used it after his sword broke. Another says he used his sword only after his axe broke.

Richard the Lionheart was often recorded in Victorian times wielding a large war axe, though references are sometimes wildly exaggerated as befitted a national hero: "Long and long after he was quiet in his grave, his terrible battle-axe, with twenty English pounds of English steel in its mighty head..." – A Child's History of England by Charles Dickens. Richard is, however, recorded as using a Danish Axe at the relief of Jaffa. Geoffrey of Lusignan is another famous crusader associated with the axe.

Robert the Bruce, King of Scotland, used an axe to defeat Henry de Bohun in single combat at the start of the Battle of Bannockburn in 1314. Given that Bruce was wielding the axe on horseback, it is likely that it was a one handed horseman's axe. They enjoyed a sustained revival among heavily armored equestrian combatants in the 15th century.

In the 14th century, the use of axes is increasingly noted by Froissart in his Chronicle, which records the engagements between the kingdoms of France and England and the rise of professional and mercenary armies in the 14th century. King John II is recorded as using one at the Battle of Poitiers in 1356 and Sir James Douglas at the Battle of Otterburn in 1388. Bretons were apparently noted axe users, with noted mercenaries Bertrand du Guesclin and Olivier de Clisson both wielding axes in battle. In these instances the type of battle axe - whether a Danish axe, or the proto-pollaxe - is not recorded.

Most medieval European battle axes had a socketed head (meaning that the thicker, butt-end of the blade contained an opening into which a wooden haft was inserted), and some included langets—long strips of metal affixed to the faces of the haft to prevent it from being damaged during combat. Occasionally the cheeks of the axehead bore engraved, etched, punched, or inlaid decorative patterns. Late-period battle axes tended to be of all-metal construction.

Such medieval polearms as the halberd and the pollaxe were variants of the basic battle-axe form.

Steel plate-armor covering almost all of a knight's body, and incorporating features specifically designed to defeat axe and sword blades, become more common in the late 14th and early 15th century. Its development led to a generation of hafted weapons with points that concentrated impact, either to penetrate steel plate or to damage the joints of articulated plate. Increasingly daggers called misericords were carried which enabled a sharp point to be thrust though gaps in armour if an opponent was disabled or being grappled with. Swords styles became more diverse – from the two-handed zweihänders to more narrow thrusting instruments with sharply pointed tips, capable of penetrating any "chinks in the armour" of a fully encased opponent: for example, the estoc.

A sharp, sometimes curved pick was often fitted to the rear of the battle axe's blade to provide the user with a secondary weapon of penetration. A stabbing spike could be added, too, as a finial. Similarly, the war hammer evolved in late-medieval times with fluted or spiked heads, which would help a strike to "bite" into the armour and deliver its energy through to the wearer, rather than glance off the armor's surface. Strikes from these armour penetrating picks were not always fatal. There are many accounts of plate armored knights being struck with said weapons and while the armour was damaged, the individual underneath survived and in some cases was completely unharmed.

A useful visual guide to high-medieval battle axes, contemporary with their employment, are the scenes of warfare depicted in the Maciejowski Bible (Morgan Bible) of c. 1250.

Battle axes also came to figure as heraldic devices on the coats of arms of several English and mainland European families.

==== Post-medieval axes ====
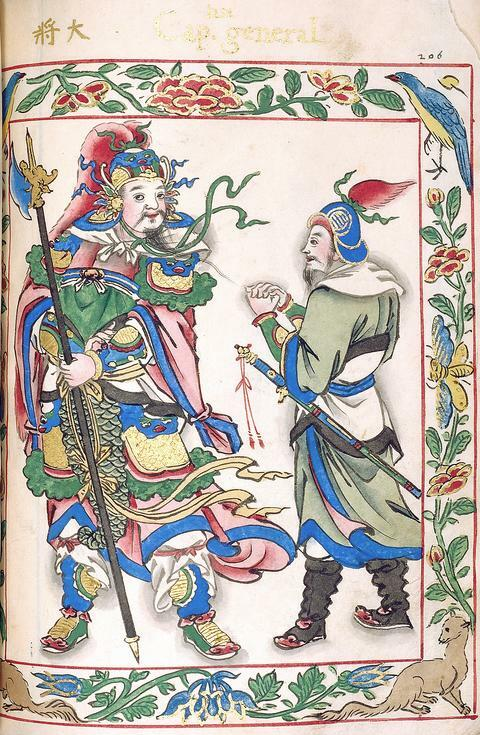
Chinese general with his attendant, from Spanish illustrations, 16th century

Battle axes were eventually phased out at the end of the 16th century as military tactics began to revolve increasingly around the use of gunpowder. However, as late as the 1640s, Prince Rupert—a Royalist general and cavalry commander during the English Civil War—is pictured carrying a battle axe, and this was not merely a decorative symbol of authority: the "short pole-axe" was adopted by Royalist cavalry officers to penetrate Roundhead troopers' helmets and cuirasses in close-quarters fighting, and it was also used by their opponents: Sir Bevil Grenville was slain by a Parliamentarian pole-axe at the Battle of Lansdowne, and Sir Richard Bulstrode was wounded by one at the Battle of Edgehill.

In Scandinavia, however, the battle axe continued in use alongside the halberd, crossbow and pole-axe until the start of the 18th century. The nature of Norwegian terrain in particular made pike and shot tactics impracticable in many cases. A law instituted in 1604 required all farmers to own weaponry to serve in the militia. The Norwegian peasant militia battle axe, much more wieldy than the pike or halberd and yet effective against mounted enemies, was a popular choice. Many such weapons were ornately decorated, and yet their functionality shows in the way that the axe head was mounted tilting upwards slightly, with a significant forward curve in the shaft, with the intent of making them more effective against armoured opponents by concentrating force onto a narrower spot.

During Napoleonic times, and later on in the 19th century, farriers in army service carried long and heavy axes as part of their kit. Although these could be used in an emergency for fighting, their primary use was logistical: the branded hooves of deceased military horses needed to be removed in order to prove that they had indeed died (and had not been stolen). Napoleon's Pioneer Corps also carried axes that were used for clearing vegetation—a practice employed by similar units in other armies.

=== Middle East ===
The tabarzin (Persian: تبرزین, lit. "saddle axe" or "saddle hatchet") is the traditional battle axe of Persia. It bears one or two crescent-shaped blades. The long form of the tabar was about seven feet long, while a shorter version was about three feet long. What made the Persian axe unique is the very thin handle, which is very light and always metallic. The tabar became one of the main weapons throughout the Middle East, and was always carried at a soldier's waist not only in Persia but Egypt, and the Arab world from the time of the Crusades. Mamluk bodyguards were known as tabardiyya after the weapon. The tabarzin is sometimes carried as a symbolic weapon by wandering dervishes (Muslim ascetic worshippers).

A Qajar-era Persian dervish, with Tabarzin (axe) Tehran's Grand Bazaar.

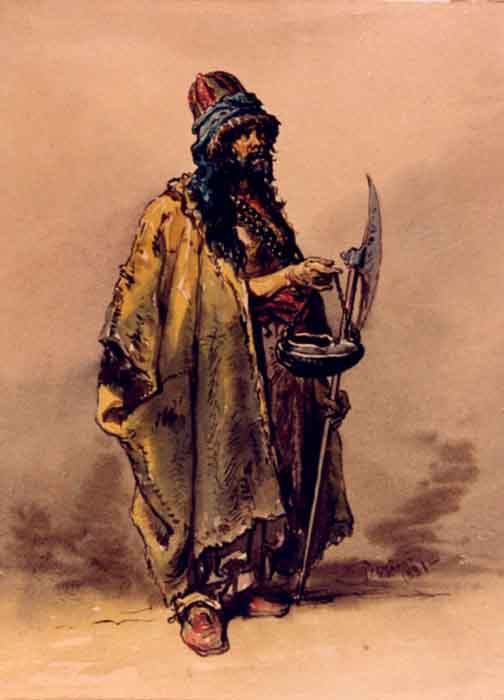
A dervish with Tabar (axe)

=== Asia ===
==== China ====
In Chinese mythology, the deity Xingtian (刑天) uses a battle axe (qi 鏚) against other gods.

Several different types of battle axes were used in ancient China. They can be divided into three subgroups: fu (斧), yue (钺) and ge (戈). A yue is, as a general rule, broader than a fu. The qi (鏚) and yue (鉞) were heavy axes. They were common in the Zhou dynasty (c. 1046–256 BCE) but fell out of favor with users due to the lack of mobility. They eventually became used only for ceremonial purposes, and such battle axes made of bronze and jade have been found.

The Chinese fu appeared in the Stone Age as a tool. In the Shang dynasty (c. 1600–c. 1060 BCE), the fu began to be made from bronze and used as a weapon. The yue was also a symbol of power during the Shang dynasty; the bigger the yue, the greater the power. There are a few rare examples of yue with a round blade and a hole in the middle.

The prominence of the fu waned on the battlefield during the Zhou dynasty (c. 1046–256 BCE). In the Warring States era, iron axes started to appear. Having lost its importance on the battle-field, the fu once again appeared during the Han and Jin dynasty as cavalry was used more often.

In the Sui and Tang dynasties, there is evidence of the subdivision of the fu. During the Song dynasty (960–1279 CE), axes were popularized, and many types of axes were created. These include the Phoenix Head Axe (Feng Tou Fu 凤头斧), Invincible Axe (Wu Di Fu 无敌斧), Opening Mountain Axe (Kai Shan Fu 开山斧), Emei Axe (E Mei Fu 峨眉斧) and Chisel Head Axe (Cuo Tou Fu 锉头斧).

In the Yuan (1271–1368) and Ming (1368–1644) dynasties, axes retained their use in the army. Water Margin 水浒传), a well-known novel from the Ming dynasty, features a character known as Li Kui, the Black Whirlwind, who wields two axes and fights naked.

In the Qing dynasty (1644–1912), new types of axes with straight edges emerged among the Eight Banners military forces. The Green Standard Army used double axes weighing 0.54 kg (1.2 lb) each, with a length of 50 cm (20 in).

In modern Chinese wushu and Chinese opera, there are many depictions of the axe. Many of these axes look thick and heavy, but the axe heads are hollow.

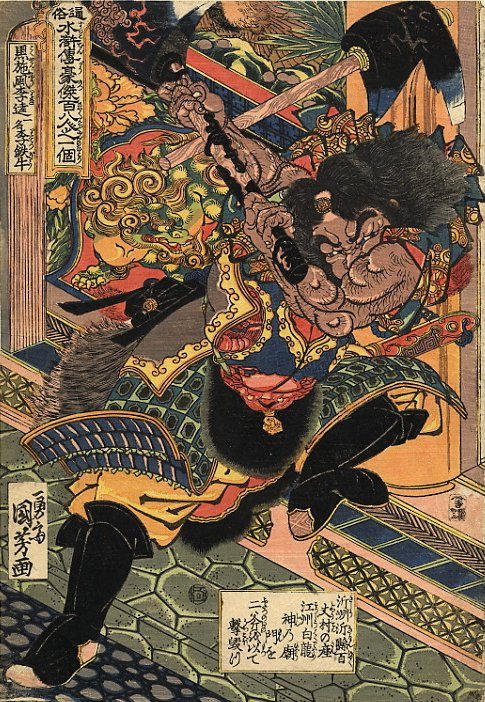
A Japanese rendition of the axe-wielding outlaw, Li Kui

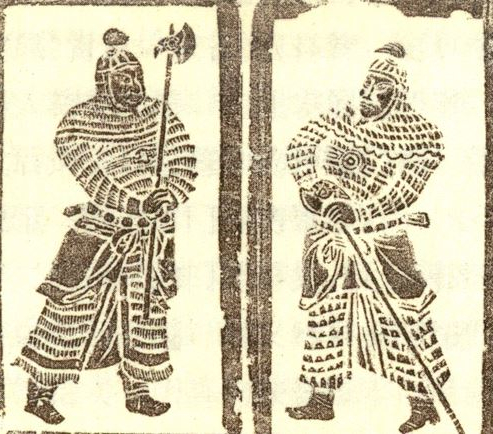
Armored axemen, Song dynasty

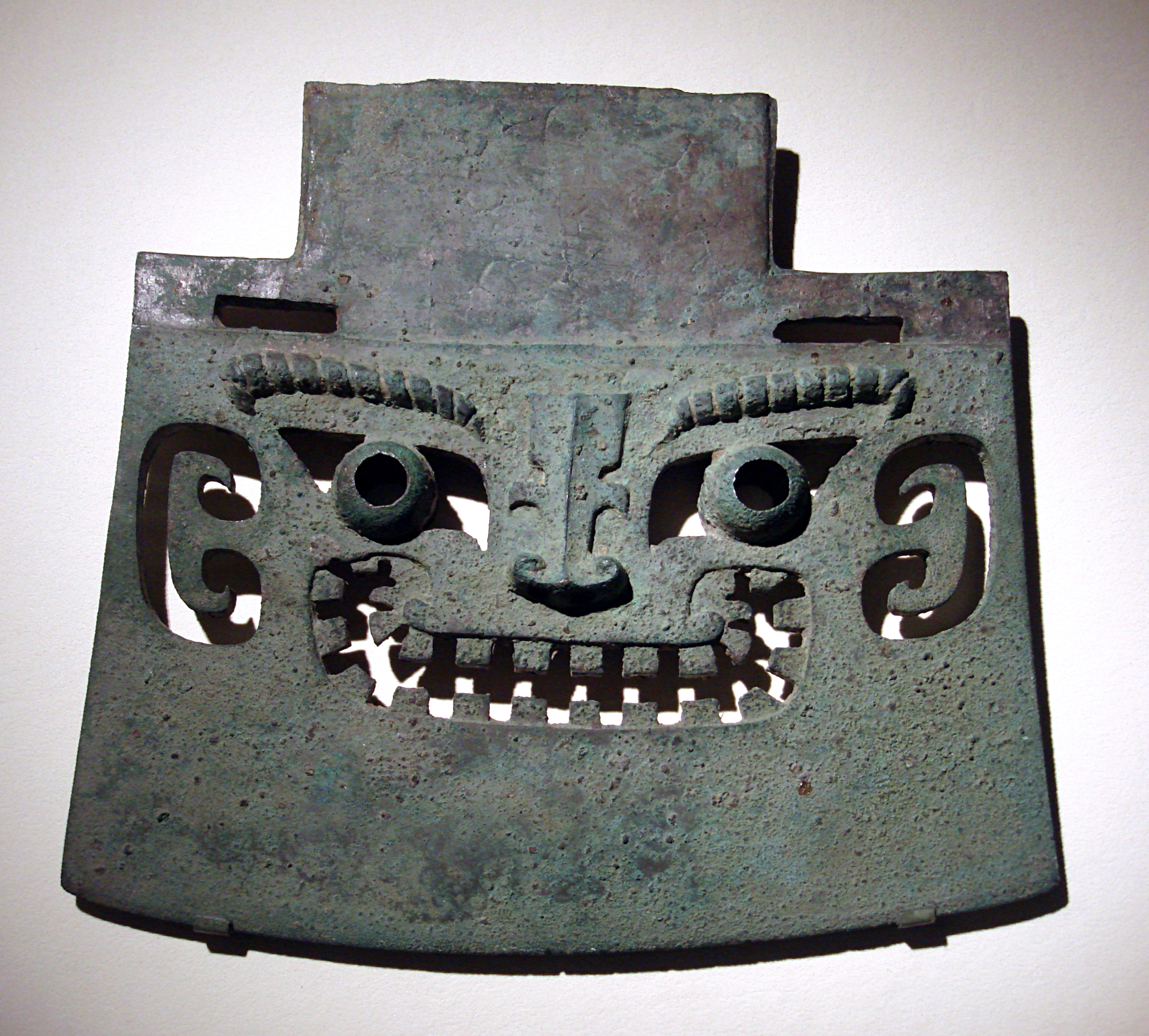
A Shang dynasty ceremonial Yue

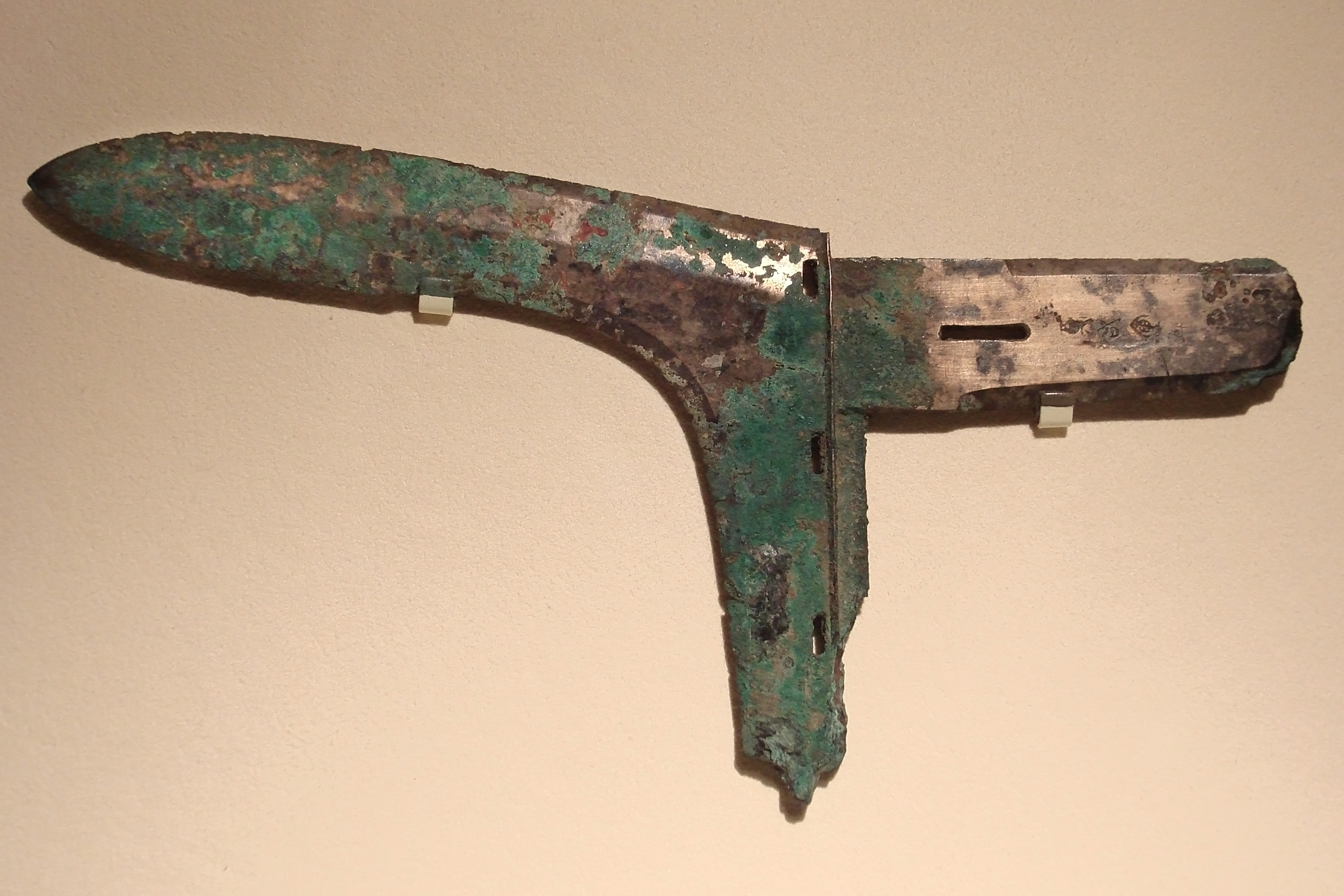
A dagger-axe (Eastern Zhou Dynasty)

==== Indian Subcontinent ====
The battle axe of ancient India was known as a parashu (or farasa in some dialects). Made from iron, bamboo, wood, or wootz steel, it usually measures 90–150 cm (3.0–4.9 ft) though some are as long as 210 cm (7 ft). A typical parashu could have a single edge or double edge, with a hole for fixing a shaft. The haft is often tied with a leather sheet to provide a good grip. The cutting edge is invariably broad and the length of the haft could be about three to four feet. The parashu is often depicted in religious art as one of the weapons of Hindu deities such as Shiva and Durga. The sixth avatar of Lord Vishnu, Parashurama, is named after the weapon. Parashu are still used as domestic tools in Indian households, particularly in the villages, as well as being carried by certain sects of eremitic sadhu.

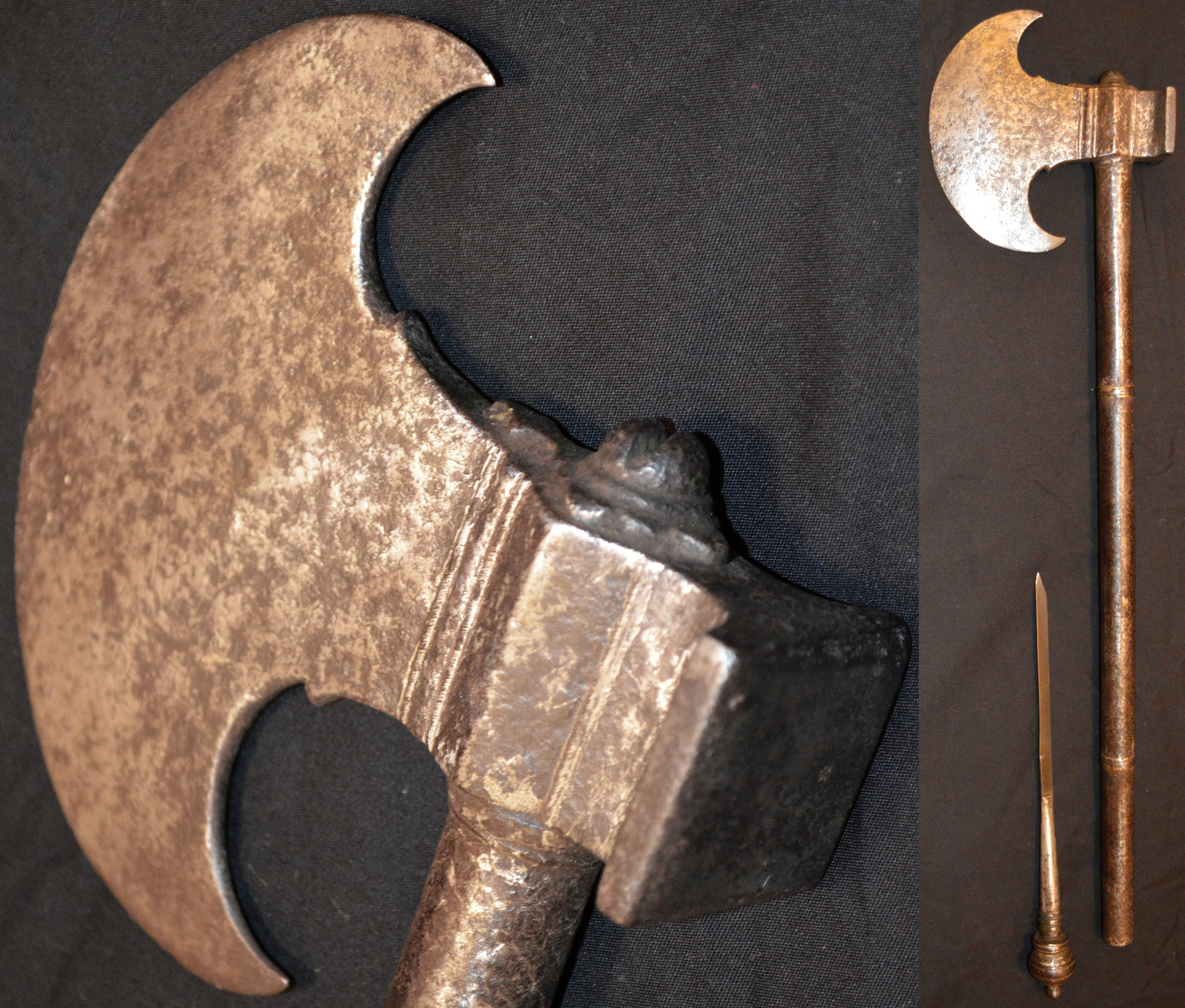
Sindhi tabar battle axe, late 18th century or earlier, crescent shape 12 cm (5 in) long head with a square hammer opposite of the blade, 55 cm (22 in) long steel haft, the end of the haft unscrews to reveal a 12 cm (5 in) slim blade. Heavily patinated head and handle with traces of engraving.

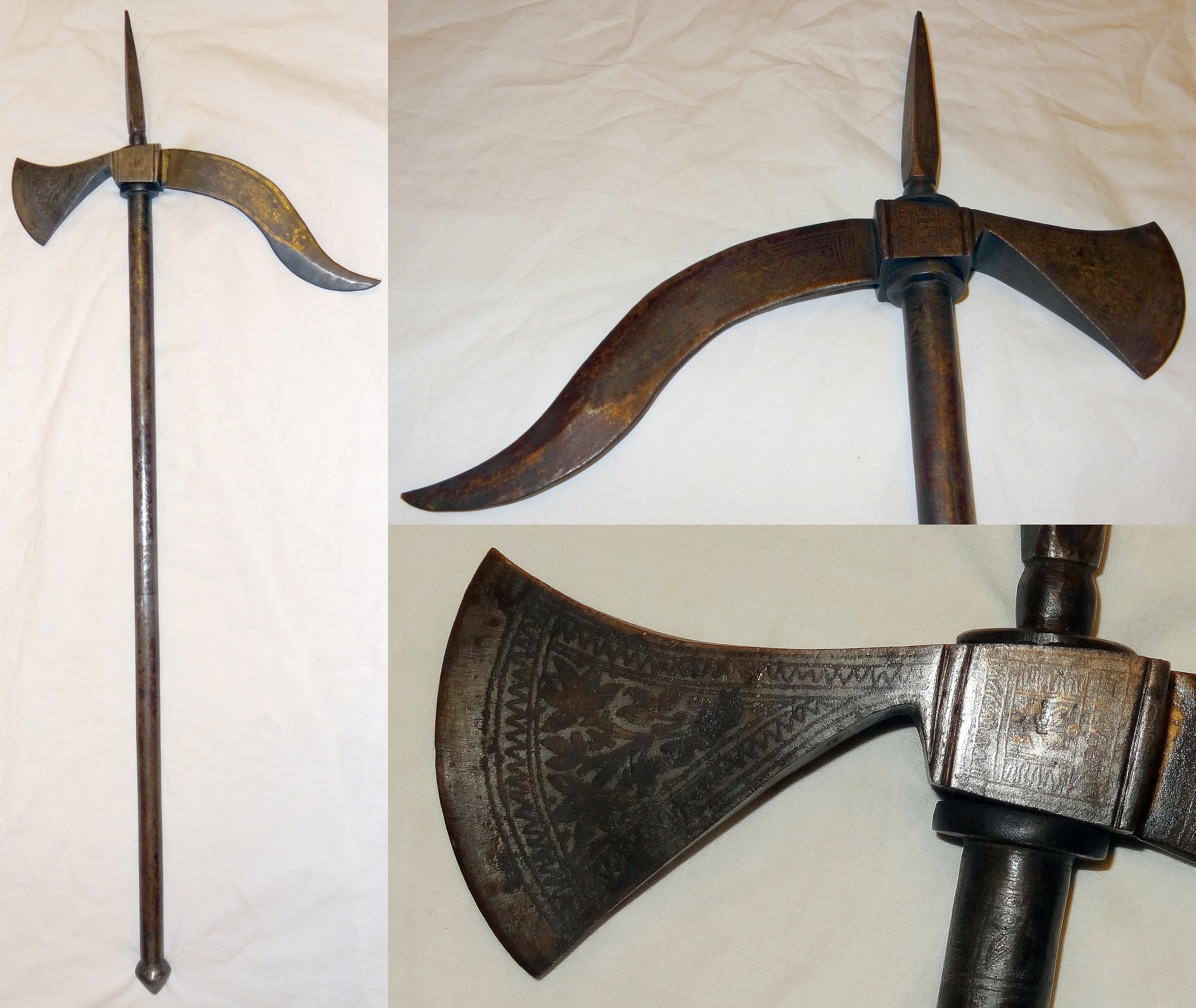
Indian tabar-zaghnal, a combination tabar axe and zaghnal war hammer / pick, all steel construction, 18th to 19th century.

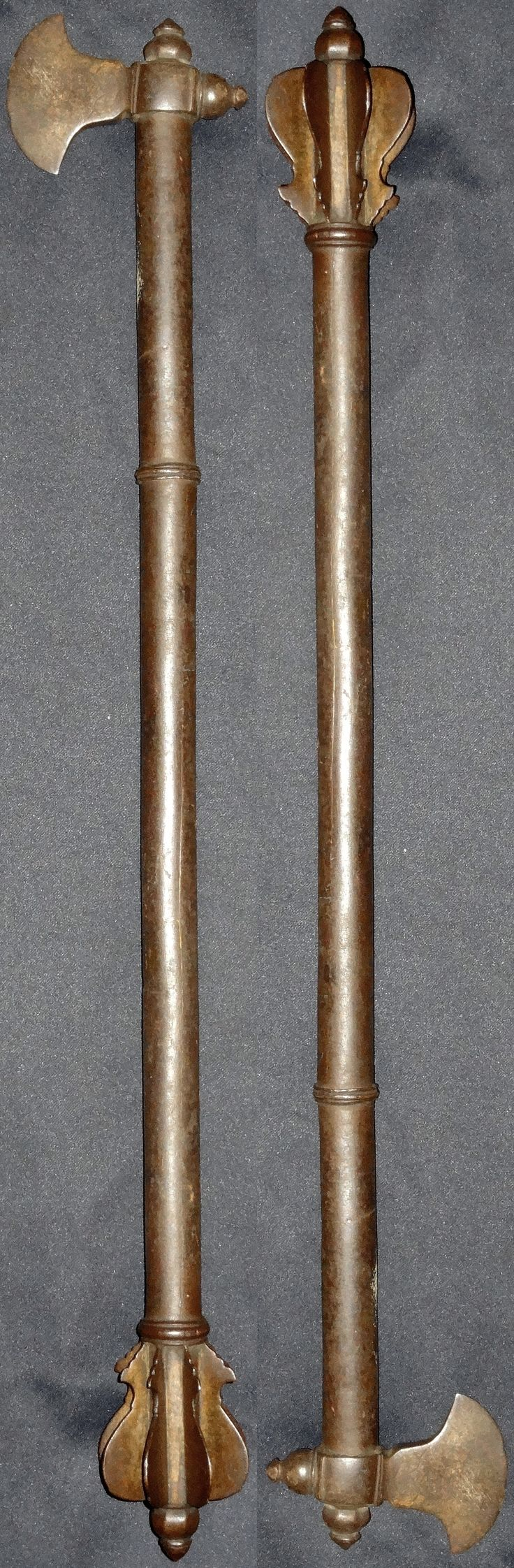
Indian (Deccan) tabar-shishpar, an extremely rare combination tabar axe and shishpar six flanged mace, steel with hollow shaft, 55 cm (22 in). 17th to 18th century.

==== Philippines ====
The panabas (also known as nawi among some ethnic groups) is a traditional battle axe favored by the Moro and Lumad tribes of Mindanao, Philippines. It was also used as an agricultural or chopping tool. It ranges in size from 60 to 120 cm (2 to 4 ft) and usually 85 cm (33 in) long and can be held with one or two hands. Hilts were often wrapped in rattan bindings or had metal collars. Due to its clean cutting capabilities it was also sometimes used as an execution weapon. It is said that the Moro warriors wielding panabas would follow the main group of warriors up front and would immediately charge in on any American survivors of the first wave of attack during the Philippine–American War.

Among the various Cordilleran peoples of the northern Philippines, another type of traditional battle axe, the head axe, was favored for headhunting raids. It was specialized for beheading enemy combatants but was also used as an agricultural tool. They were banned, along with headhunting practices, during the American colonial period of the Philippines in the early 20th century.

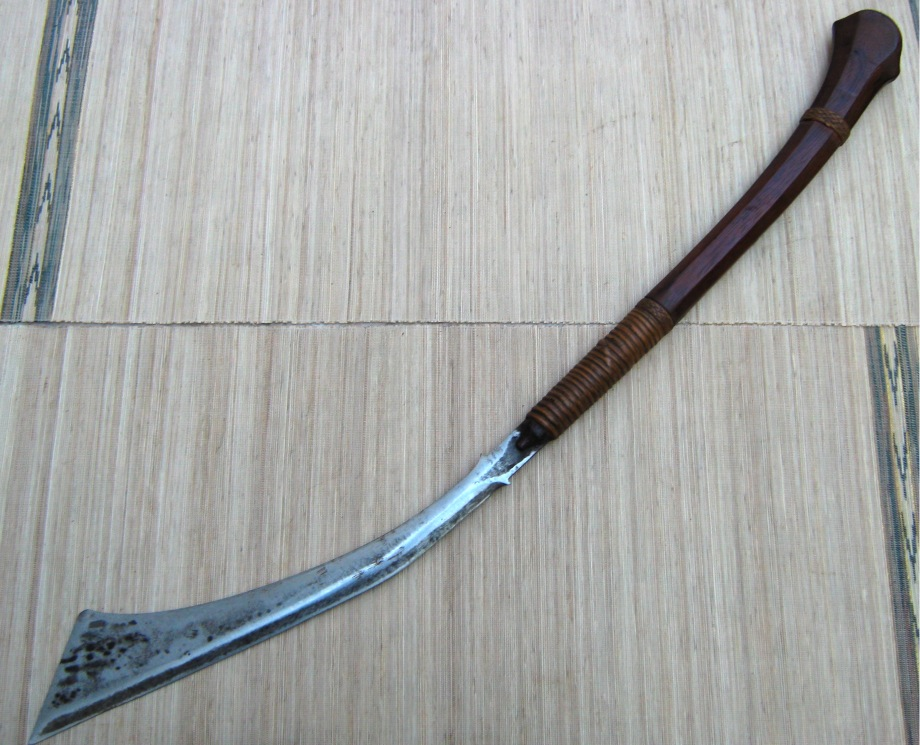
A Moro nawi

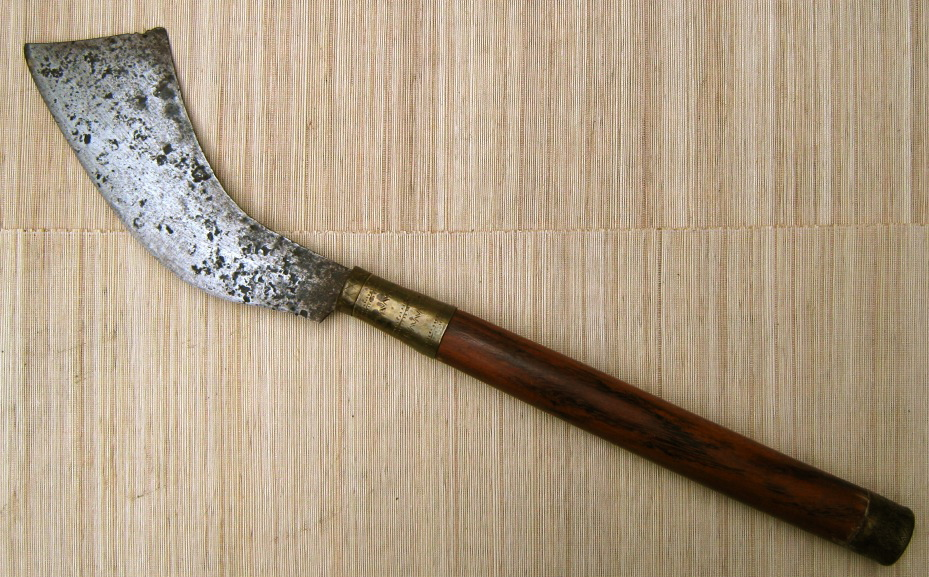
A Lumad panabas

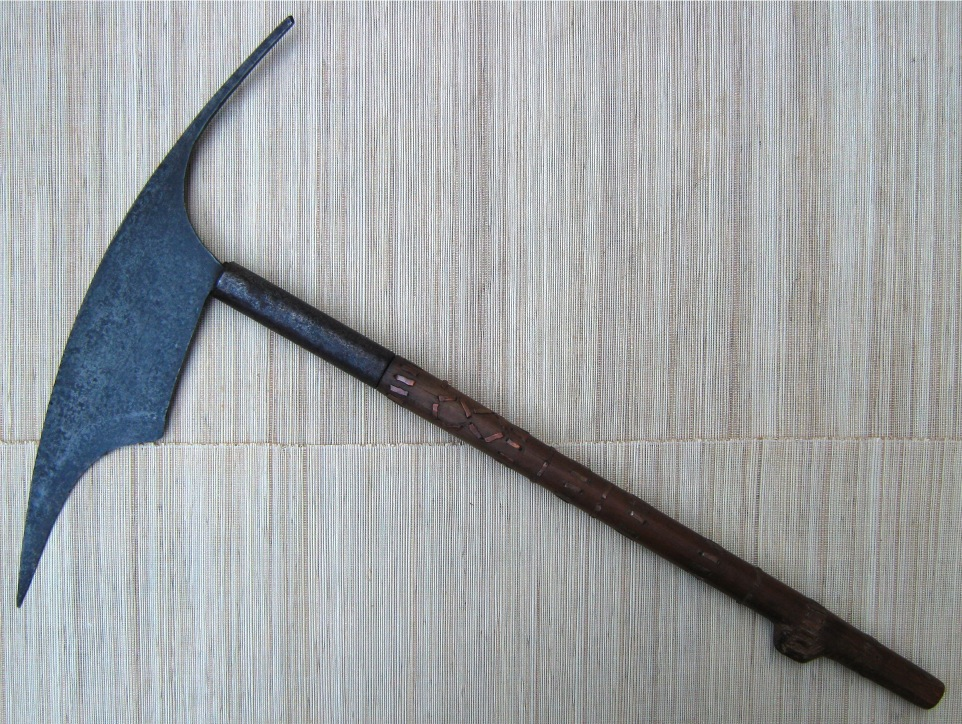
A Kalinga head axe

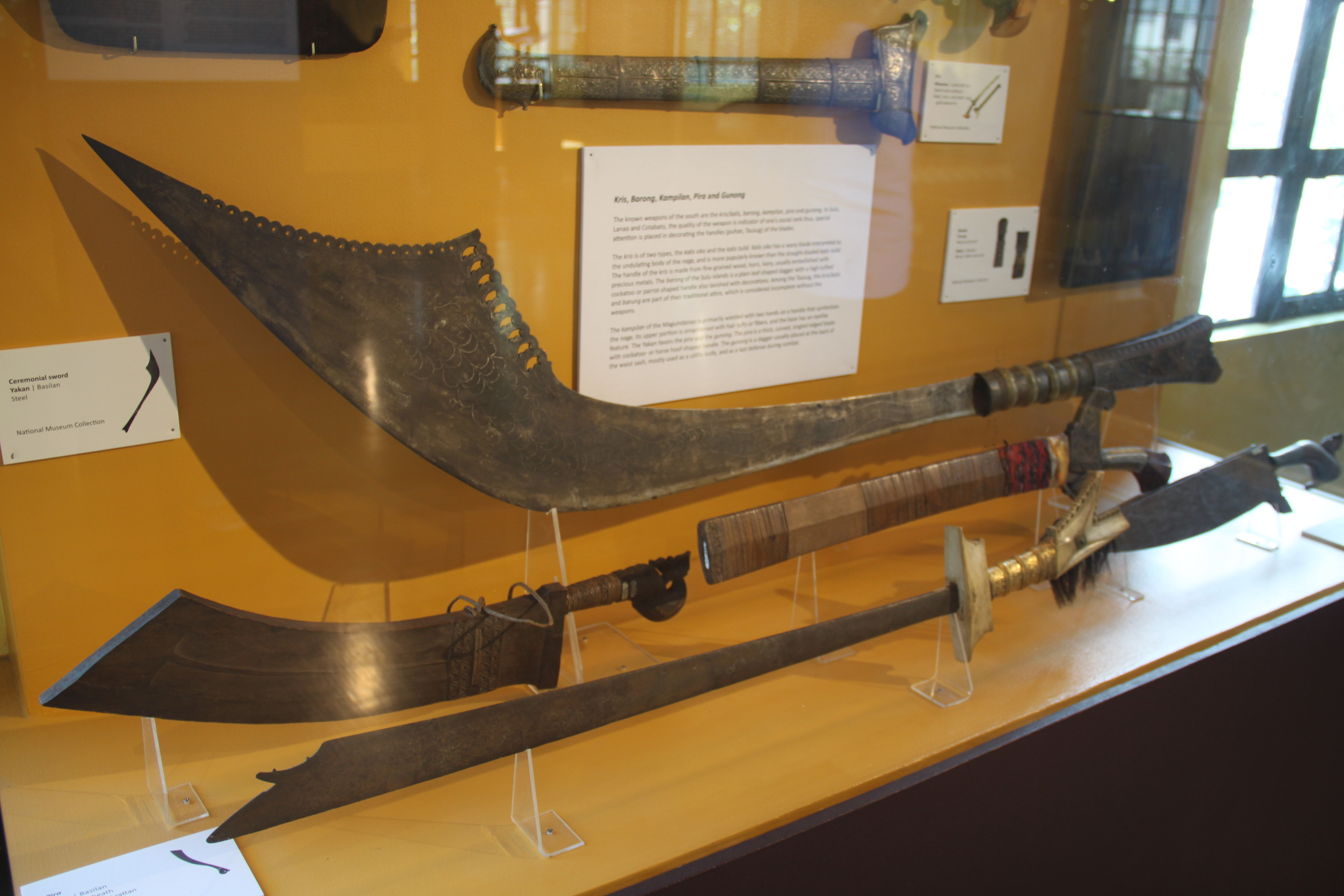
A very large Yakan ceremonial panabas for executions

==== Sri Lanka ====
The keteriya was a type of battle axe that was used in ancient Sri Lanka. A keteriya consisted of a single edge and a short handle made of wood. This would allow the user to wield it with a single hand.

==== Vietnam ====
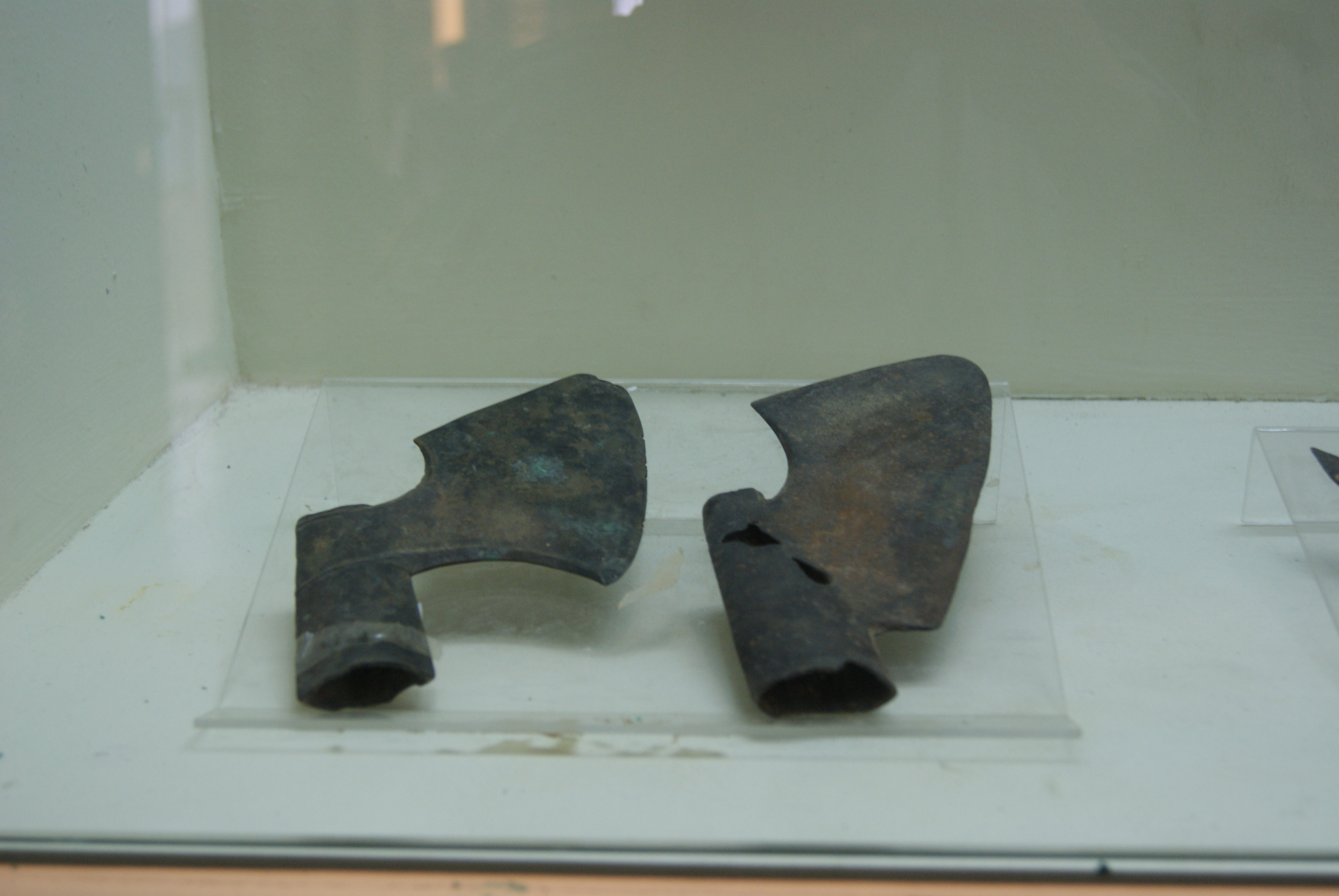
Dong Son axes

The battle axe is one of the most common type of weapons found in Vietnamese ancient cultures, particularly the Dong Son culture.

== See also ==
- Bardiche
- Fasces
- Norwegian battle axe
- Ono (axe) Japanese
- Sovnya
- Tomahawk
- Viking Age arms and armour
