= Long axe =

Long axe or Long Axe can refer to:

== Axes ==
- Two-hand axe – any axe intended for two-hand usage
- Dane axe – European two-hand combat axe used during the Viking Age
- Poleaxe – European two-hand combat axe used during the Late Middle Ages
- Halberd – European two-hand combat axe used during the Late Middle Ages

== Other ==
- Long Axe – Member of the Wu-Tang Clan-affiliated group "The Beggas" and spin-off groups "Hidden Aspects" and "Black Lotus", see List of Wu-Tang Clan affiliates
