= Parashu =

Sanskrit term for axe

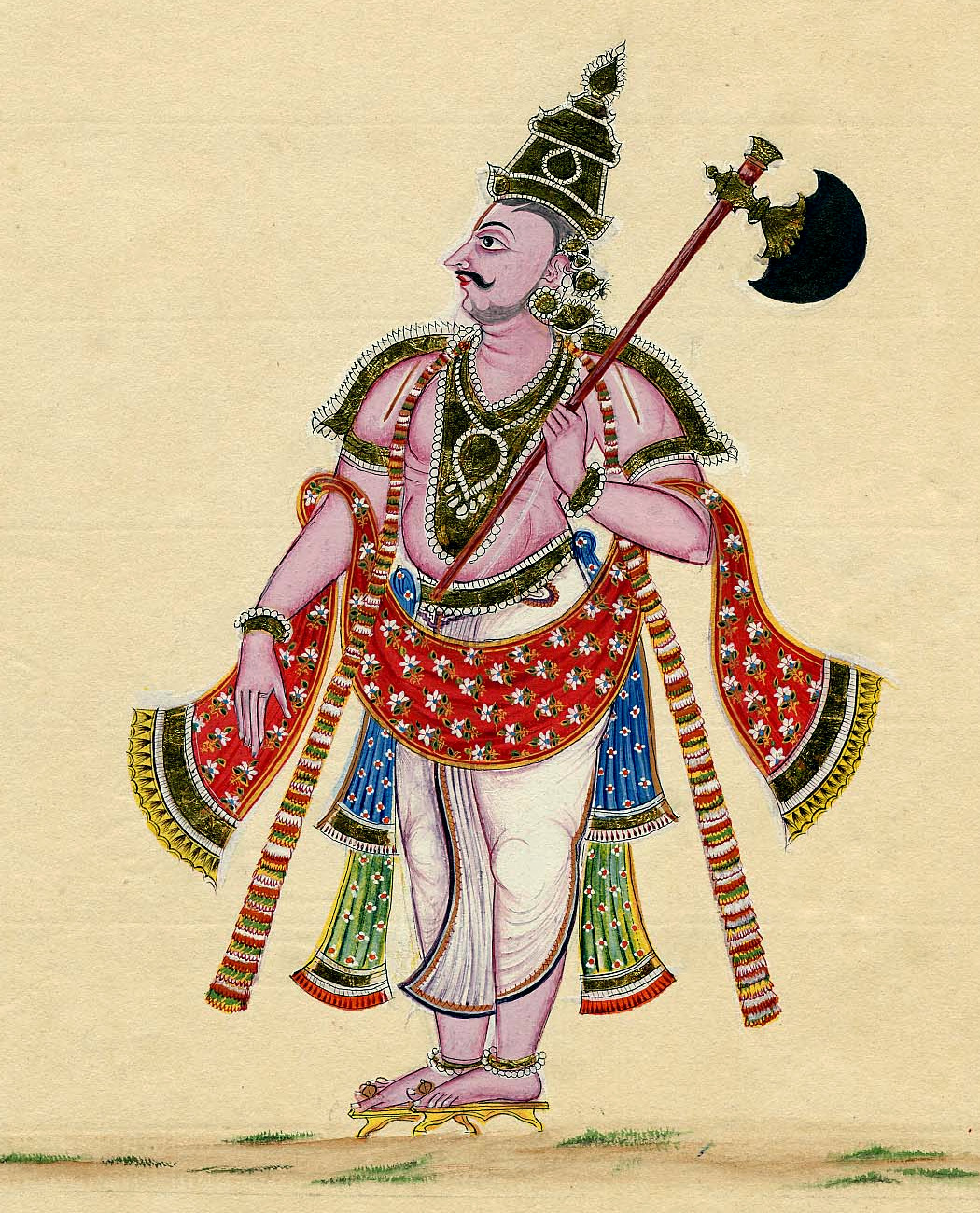
- Parashurama holding a parashu
- Type: Axe
- Place of origin: India

Parashu (Sanskrit: Paraśu) is the Sanskrit word for a battle-axe, which can be wielded with one or both hands.

== Construction ==
The parashu could be double-edge bladed or single-edge bladed with a spike on the non cutting edge. It usually measures between 90–150 cm (35–59 in), though some are as long as 210 cm (83 in). The parashu is usually made of iron or wootz steel. The cutting edge is broader than the edge which is attached to the haft. The haft is often tied with a leather sheet to provide a good grip.

== Hinduism ==
The parashu named Vidyudabhi is the weapon of the god Shiva who gave it to Parashurama, the sixth avatar of Vishnu, whose name means "Rama with the axe" and also taught him its mastery. Parashurama was the guru of Drona, the guru who instructed the Pandavas in the epic Mahabharata. Bhishma and Karna, the half-brother of the Pandavas, also took instruction in weaponry from Parashurama. Parashurama was known to have terrible temper, having lost his father to the wicked Kshatriya Kartavirya Arjuna (not to be confused with Arjuna of Mahabharata). Parashurama's weapon had supernatural powers. It had four cutting edges, one on each end of the blade head and one on each end of the shaft.

The parashu was known as the most lethal close combat weapon of the epics. It is one of the weapons of Shiva, Parashurama, and Durga and is still depicted on their idols throughout India. It is also one of the weapons of Ganesha, and the main weapon of Sahadeva and Shakuni.

== Legend ==
The regional Hindu creation myth of Kerala is often attributed to the parashu of Parashurama. According to tradition, Parashurama was offered boons by both Varuna and Bhudevi, the deities who personify the ocean and the earth, respectively. He is stated to have travelled to Kanyakumari, the southernmost tip of the Indian mainland, and thrown his axe northward, recovering a swathe of land from the ocean, which would become Kerala.
