= Public Seal of Samoa =

State seal of Samoa

- Armiger: Independent State of Samoa
- Adopted: 1962
- Motto: Fa'avae i le Atua Samoa "God be the Foundation of Samoa"

The Public Seal of Samoa is the state seal of Samoa. It takes inspiration from the emblem of the United Nations, as New Zealand administered Western Samoa first as a League of Nations mandate and then as a United Nations trust territory until the country received its independence on 1 January 1962, as Western Samoa. Samoa was the first Polynesian nation to reestablish independence in the 20th century. The background is cross-hatched with a grid like the United Nations emblem, and most of the other elements are duplicated on the national flag.

== Description ==
The official crest or badge of Samoa is the public seal excluding the surrounding concentric circles, and the words "The Public Seal of the Independent State of Samoa". The crest is used by government bodies on official paper documents, while the public seal is used by the head of state of Samoa, the O le Ao o le Malo. The public seal is defined by legislation as follows:

A silver shield with the lower two-thirds blue, having thereon 5 silver stars representing the constellation of the Southern Cross, of the same shape and the same relative sizes and dispositions among themselves as in the Flag of Samoa; one half of the upper third depicting a green sea with a green coconut palm issuing therefrom; the shield being surmounted by a gold cross, and superimposed on 2 concentric circles of the world and the olive leaves as in the United Nations Badge, and bearing the subscription of the motto "Fa'avae i Le Atua Samoa", meaning in the English language "God be the Foundation of Samoa", the whole being contained within surrounding concentric circles between which are inscribed the words "The Public Seal of the Independent State of Samoa".

== Historical coat of arms ==
Coat of arms from the Kingdom of Samoa 1873 to 1900

Proposed, but ultimately unused, coat of arms of German Samoa in 1914

Badge of the Western Samoa Trust Territory from 1925 to 1951

Seal of Western Samoa from 1951 to 1962
