= Dane axe =

Viking weapon

Dane axe / Long axe
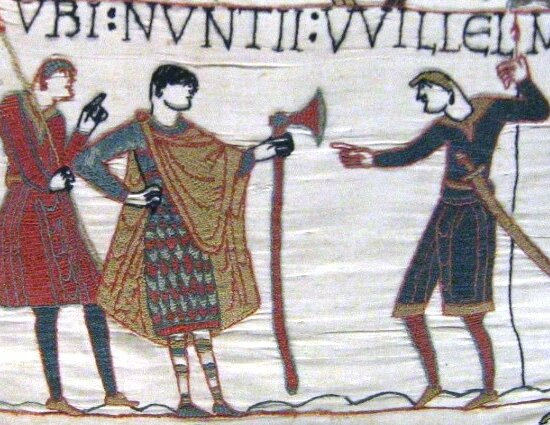
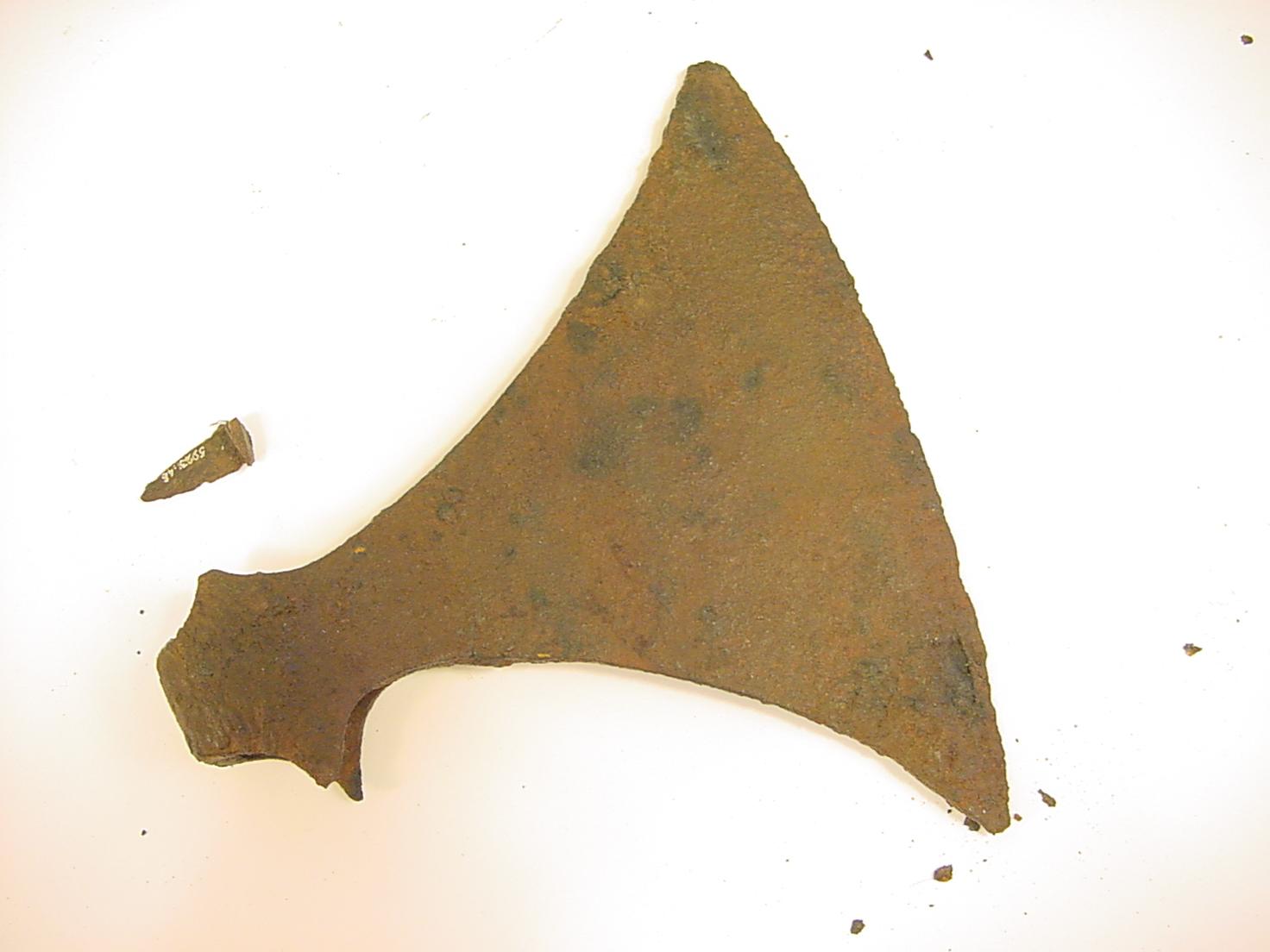
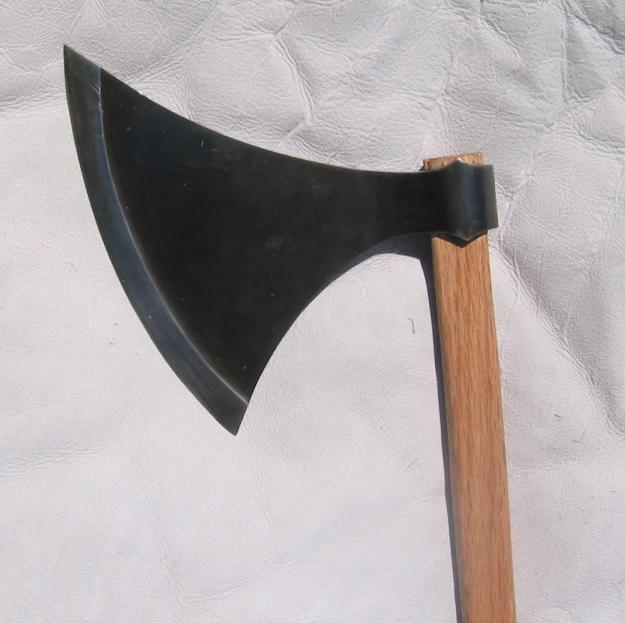
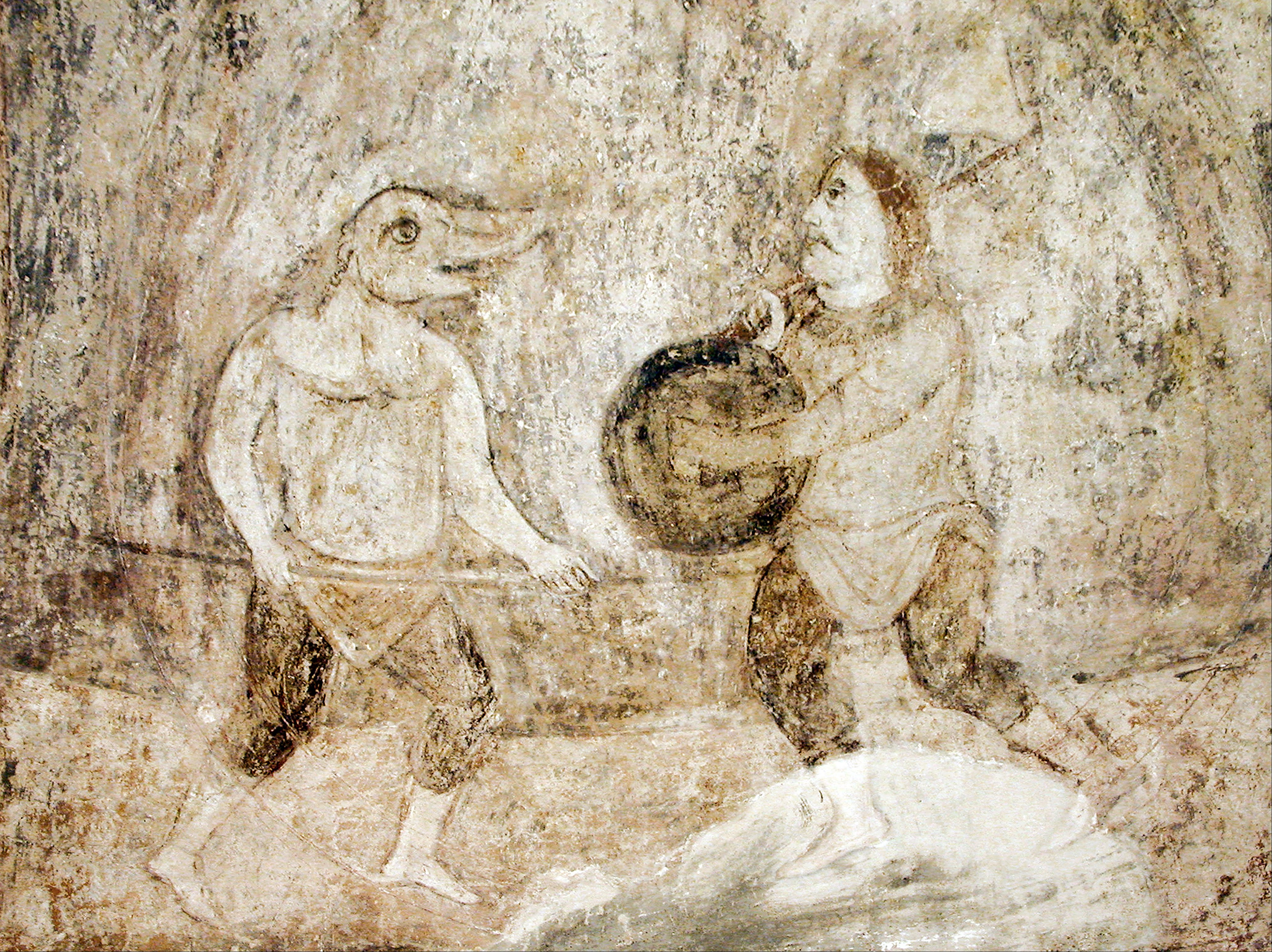
- Upper left: Dane axe depicted on the Bayeux Tapestry.
- Upper right: Dane axe head found at Uppsala, Sweden.
- Lower left: Replica Dane axe head, Petersen Type L or Type M, based on original from Tower of London.
- Lower right: 9th century mural, Saint Sophia Cathedral, Kyiv, depicting two Varangians during a ritual, one with a dane axe and round shield.

The Dane axe or long axe (including Danish axe and English long axe) is a type of European early medieval period two-handed battle axe with a very long shaft, around 0.9–1.2 metres (2 ft 11 in – 3 ft 11 in) at the low end to 1.5–1.7 metres (4 ft 11 in – 5 ft 7 in) or more at the long end. Sometimes called a broadaxe (Old Norse: breiðøx), the blade was broad and thin, intended to give a long powerful cut when swung, effective against cavalry, shields and unarmored opponents.

Dane axes were predominantly used during the European Viking Age to the transition between the Early Middle Ages and High Middle Ages, later being developed into the poleaxe, halberd and other similar polearms by lengthening the shaft and adding a lengthwise pike on the end and spike on the reverse. It is one of the predominant weapons depicted on the Bayeux Tapestry, a period tapestry depicting the events of the Norman Conquest of England in 1066, and one of the specified weapons common with the Varangian Guard.

== Construction ==
Most axes, both in period illustrations and extant artifact, that fall under the description of Danish axe possess type L or type M heads according to the Petersen axe typology. Both types consist of a wide, thin blade, with pronounced "horns" at both the toe and heel of the bit. Cutting surfaces vary, but is generally between 20 and 30 cm (8 and 12 in). Type L blades tend to be smaller, with the toe of the bit swept forward for superior shearing capability. Later type M blades are typically larger overall, with a more symmetrical toe and heel.

The blade itself was reasonably light and forged very thin, making it superb for cutting. The thickness of the body on top the edge is as thin as 2 mm (0.079 in). Many of these axes were constructed with a reinforced bit, typically of a higher carbon steel to facilitate a harder, sharper edge. Average weight of an axe this size is between 1 and 2 kg (2.2 and 4.4 lb). Proportionally, the long axe has more in common with a modern meat cleaver than a wood axe. This complex construction (i.e. forged thin and incorporating a harder type of steel near the edge) results in a lively and quick weapon with devastating cutting ability.

Based on period depictions, the haft of a longaxe for combat was usually between approx. 0.9 and 1.2 m (3.0 and 3.9 ft) long, although Dane axes used as status symbols might be as long as 1.5 to 1.7 m (5 to 5½ ft). Such axes might also feature inlaid silver and frequently do not have the flared steel edge of a weapon designed for war. Some surviving examples also feature a brass haft cap, often richly decorated, which presumably served to keep the head of the weapon secure on the haft, as well as protecting the end of the haft from the rigours of battle. Ash and oak are the most likely materials for the haft, as they have always been the primary materials used for polearms in Europe.

== History ==
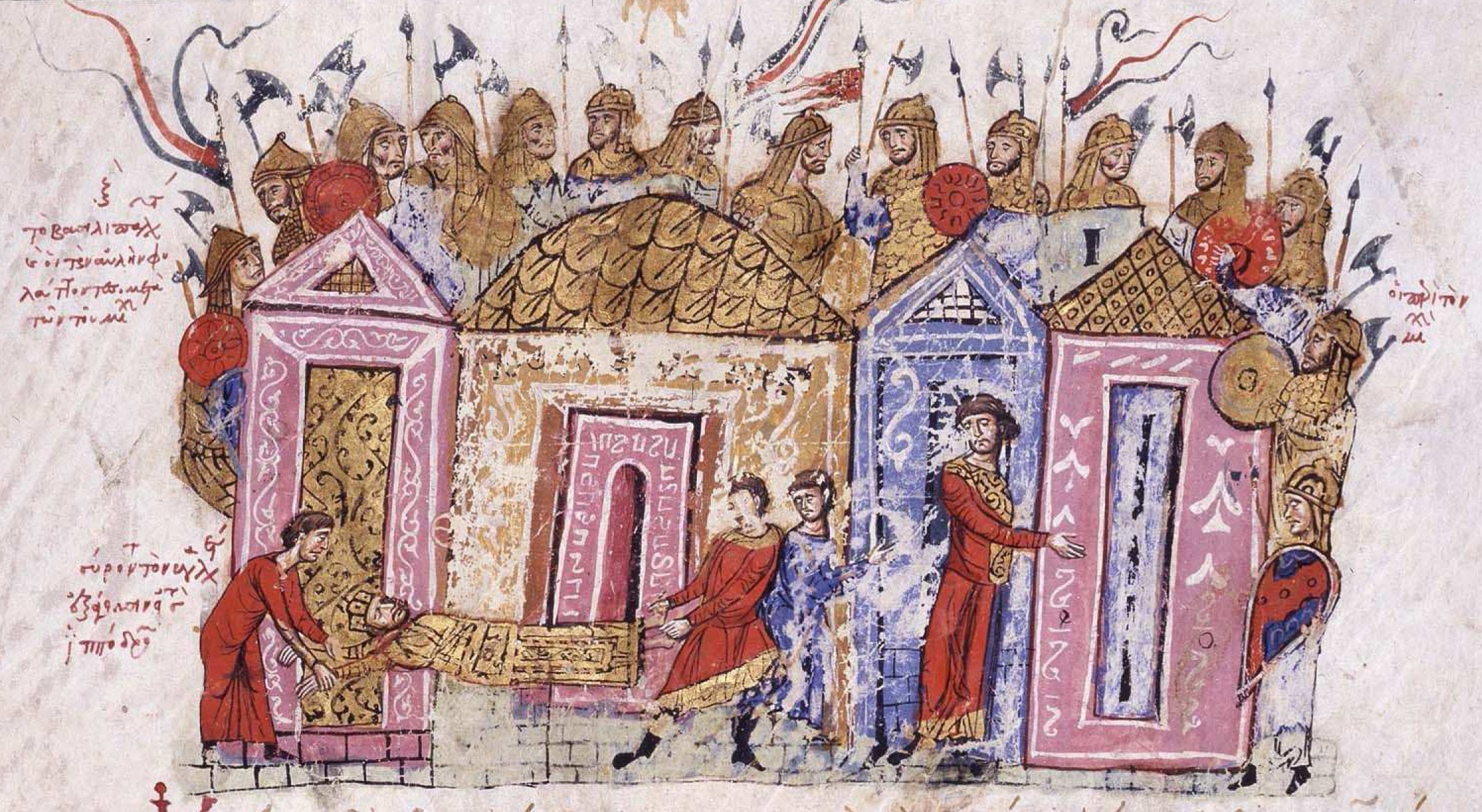
Depiction of the Varangian Guard with Dane axes, from the 12th-century Madrid Skylitzes manuscript.

Through the course of the 9th to the 11th centuries, the Dane axe began to gain further popularity outside of Scandinavia, either through Viking trade or influence or independent developments; such as England, Ireland and Normandy. Historical accounts may depict the Dane axe as the weapon of some of the warrior elite in this period, such as the Huscarls of Anglo-Saxon England. In the Bayeux Tapestry, a visual record of the ascent of William the Conqueror to the throne of England, the axe is almost exclusively wielded by well armoured huscarls. These huscarls formed the core bodyguard of King Harold at the Battle of Hastings. A Dane axe, perhaps King Edward's, is offered to Harold before he is crowned. The Bayeux Tapestry also depicts a huscarl cleaving a Norman knight's horse's head with one blow. The Dane axe is also known to have been used by the Varangian Guard, also known as pelekyphoros phroura (πελεκυφόρος φρουρά), the "axe-bearing guard", who were mercenary soldiers from northern and eastern Europe employed by the Byzantine emperors. One surviving ivory plaque from 10th-century Constantinople depicts a Varangian holding an axe that is at least as tall as its wielder.

The Dane axe became widely used throughout Europe from the 10th century, with axes gaining acceptance as a knightly weapon not long after; albeit not achieving the status of the sword. They also began to be used widely as an infantry polearm, with the haft lengthened to about 1.8 m (5.9 ft). The 13th and 14th centuries also saw form changes, with the blade also lengthening, the rear horn extending to touch or attach to the haft. The lengthened weapon, especially if combined with the lengthened blade, was called a sparth in England. Some believe this weapon is the ancestor of the halberd.

While the use of the Dane axe continued into the 14th century, axes with an armour-piercing back-spike and spear-like spike on the forward end of the haft became more common, eventually evolving into the poleaxe in the 15th century. The simple Danish axe continued to be used in the West of Scotland and in Ireland into the 16th century. In Ireland, it was particularly associated with gallowglass mercenaries.

== Famous historical figures associated with the axe ==
After the Battle of Stiklestad, the axe also became the symbol of St. Olaf and can still be seen on the Coat of Arms of Norway. However, this is because the axe is the implement of his martyrdom, rather than signifying use.

The Anglo-Saxon Chronicle describes how a giant Norse axeman wielding what was most likely a Dane axe single-handedly cut down up to 40 Englishmen during the battle of Stamford bridge. Supposedly, he was only defeated when an English soldier floated under the bridge in a barrel and thrust his spear through the planks, mortally wounding the axeman.

King Stephen of England famously used a Danish axe at the Battle of Lincoln 1141. While one account says after his sword broke, another says he used his sword only after his axe broke.

Richard the Lionheart was often recorded in Victorian times wielding a large war axe, though references are sometimes wildly exaggerated as befitted a national hero:

Long and long after he was quiet in his grave, his terrible battle-axe, with twenty English pounds of English steel in its mighty head […]

— Charles Dickens, A Child's History of England

Richard is, however, recorded as using a Danish Axe at the relief of Jaffa. Geoffrey of Lusignan is another famous crusader associated with the axe.

Robert the Bruce, King of Scotland, famously killed Henry de Bohun at the Battle of Bannockburn with a single blow of his axe. The blow was so powerful it split de Bohun's helmet and skull open and snapped the shaft of the axe. Depictions of the axe show a standard battle axe, however, not a Dane Axe.

In the 14th century, the use of axes is increasingly noted by Froissart in his Chronicle, with King John II using one at the Battle of Poitiers in 1356 and Sir James Douglas at the Battle of Otterburn in 1388. Bretons were apparently noted axe users, with Bertrand du Guesclin and Olivier de Clisson both wielding axes in battle. In these cases, it is uncertain whether the weapon was a Danish axe, or the proto-pollaxe.

== See also ==
- Broadaxe
- Long-bearded axe
- Sparth
- Viking Age arms and armour
- Viking halberd
