= Coat of arms of Norway =

- State version Design by Sverre Morken, 1992

Versions
- Royal version Design by Eilif Peterssen, 1905

- Royal achievement

- The banner of arms, which serves as royal standard
- Armiger: Haakon VIII, King of Norway (royal version); Government of Norway (state version)
- Adopted: 1280 or earlier
- Shield: Gules, a lion rampant Or, crowned and bearing an axe Or with blade Argent
- Order: Order of St. Olav
- Other elements: Mantle

The coat of arms of Norway is the arms of dominion of King Haakon VIII, and as such represents both the monarch and the kingdom (nation and the state). It depicts a standing golden lion on a red background, bearing a golden crown and axe with silver blade (blazoned Gules, a lion rampant Or, crowned Or, holding an axe Or with a blade argent).

The coat of arms is used by the King (including the King's Council), the Parliament, and the Supreme Court, which are the three powers according to the Constitution. It is also used by several national, regional, and local authorities that are subordinate to the aforementioned, for example the County Governors and both the district courts and the courts of appeal. Since 1905, two parallel versions exist: the more elaborate version used by the King and the simpler one used by the State. The arms in banner form serve as basis for the monarch's flag, known as the Royal Standard.

In addition, there are former and existing lands (e.g. the Earldom of Iceland and the Orkney Islands), cities (e.g. Kristiansand), organisations (e.g. the Museum of Cultural History), companies (e.g. Adresseavisen), and families (e.g. the Counts of Gyldenløve and Gudbrand Gregersen) who have been granted the right to bear the coat of arms or derivations of this. Unless officially granted, it is illegal to use the coat of arms.

The arms has its origin in the 13th century, at first just as a golden lion on a red shield, with the silver axe added late in the century, symbolising Olav II as the Eternal King of Norway. In origin the arms of the Sverre dynasty, the coat of arms became quartered with that of the Bjälbo dynasty when the Sverre lineage was extinct in 1319, and the Sverre coat of arms figured as part of the further divisions of the coats of arms of Norwegian kings during the early modern period.

The Sverre coat of arms was regarded as representing the Norwegian monarchy in the late 15th century, and it came to be used to represent Norway on coins and in seals during the union with Denmark (1523−1814) and the 19th-century personal union with Sweden, its 13th-century origins placing it among the oldest state coats of arms which remain in contemporary use. The axe tended to be depicted as a curved pollaxe or halberd from 1500 until 1844. The 1844 design approved by king Oscar I reverted to the depiction of a battle-axe as shown in medieval designs.

After the dissolution of the union with Sweden in 1905 a medieval-type escutcheon and charge was designed by Eilif Peterssen. Peterssen's design would be used until 1937 when it was re-designed by state archivist Hallvard Trætteberg, resulting in a markedly different, more simplified design style. Peterssen's design has, however, been retained in the Royal Standard and coat of arms.

== Usage ==
Royal decree of 20 May 1927 states: The coat of arms of the Realm may be used only by the state's authorities in the exercise of their official activity. The coat of arms may be used by the Royal Court, by the government and its ministries, by the parliament, by the law courts, and by some others. Matters of the coat of arms are treated by the Ministry of Foreign Affairs. The state coat of arms has no achievement save the surmounting crown.

The royal coat of arms is defined in the resolution of 30 December 1905. In the coat of arms of the realm, a heraldic royal crown is placed directly on top of the shield. In the royal coat of arms, the shield of the arms of the realm is on a mantle purple lined ermine with a royal crown on top. Three sides of the shield are surrounded by the collar of the Royal Order of St. Olav.

The following coats of arms are displayed with the collar of the Order of St. Olav. However, not all Princes and Princesses are Grand Cross holders or, for that sake, members of this order at all, wherefore their respective coats of arms do not include this achievement.

The Royal Standard of Norway is the Norwegian arms in banner form.

Achievements including the royal arms:

Police Service

Customs Service

Border Control and Arrest Service

Armed Forces

Air Force pilots

Railways (1923–1996)

Telegraph Administration (1924–1994)

Mapping Authority (1910)

Rifle Association

Military Marksmanship Mark

== History ==
=== Origin ===
The design of the coat of arms is derived from that of the Sverre dynasty. Hallvard Trætteberg suggested that Sverre, who was king between 1184 and 1202, had a lion in his coat of arms, although there is no direct attestation. Snorre Sturlason claims that a golden lion on a red background was used already in 1103 by King Magnus III, the son of King Olav III. Gustav Storm in 1894 concluded that this is ahistorical. Storm explained that the claimed lion in King Magnus's coat of arms is unknown both in the older Saga literature and in other contemporary sources. It is possible that Snorre, who wrote under the instruction of the King, attributed King Sverre's coat of arms to earlier Kings of Norway.

A lion is shown on the coat of arms in the seal of Earl Skule Bårdsson, dated 1225, who had relations to the royal family.

Haakon Haakonson the Old had a lion in his seal, shown as lying between the feet of the seated king. A royal coat of arms with a lion is finally seen on the seal of Haakon Haakonson the Young, dated 1250.

The first instance of the lion bearing an axe is found in a seal of Eric II (1285).

=== Medieval seals ===
Seal	Bearer	Description
	Earl Skule	Used in 1225.
	King Haakon the Old	Seal of 1247/1248, in which a small lion lies between the King's feet.
	King Haakon the Old	Reverse of the latter.
	King Haakon the Young	Seal of 1250.
	King Eric II	Seal of 1298. Whilst the lion in the shield does not appear to bear an axe, the one on the caparison does.

Approximately in 1280, either King Magnus VI (dead in 1280) or the guardianship of his son Eric Magnuson let the lion be equipped with a crown of gold and in the foremost paws an axe of silver. The axe was a symbol of Saint Olav, i.e. King Olav II, and by inserting it into the coat of arms it symbolised that the King was the rightful heir and descendant of the "Eternal King of Norway" (Latin: Rex Perpetuus Norvegiae).

Seal	Bearer	Description
	King Eric II	Seal of 1285.
	King Eric II	Seal of 1283 and 1285. This is a variant in which the shield has flowers.
	Duke Haakon Magnusson	Seal of between 1292 and 1298.
	King Haakon V	Seal of between 1300 and 1302.
	Duchess Ingeborg	Seal of 1318.
	King Haakon VI	Seal on documents between 1358 and 1369.
	King Haakon VI	Seal on documents between 1358 and 1376.
	King Magnus VII (r. 1319–1343)	
	King Olav IV	Seal of 1382 and 1384.
	King Haakon V	
	Queen Margaret	Her seal as Norway's sovereign. She holds both an Olaf axe and the Royal Coat of Arms—a powerful symbolism.

=== Late medieval coats of arms ===
With the death of King Haakon V in 1319, the reign of the Sverre dynasty came to an end. The Throne and thus the Royal Coat of Arms was inherited by Magnus VII, who was a maternal grandson of Haakon V and who himself belonged patrilineally to the family known as the Bjälbo dynasty.

Subsequently, Norway remained in personal union with neighbouring countries. When acting as the ruler of one particular country, the sovereign would normally use the arms of that kingdom. When acting as sovereign of the united kingdoms, he would marshal the escutcheon by quartering. This was a tendency in Europe in general.

The first union kings placed the Royal Coat of Arms in the first quarter of the quartered coat of arms. At the beginning of the Kalmar Union, Norway as a hereditary kingdom was considered more important than Sweden and Denmark, which were still electoral kingdoms. Consequently, King Eric III of Pomerania placed his Norwegian Coat of Arms in an inescutcheon, superimposed on the coats of arms of his other realms. However, the Norwegian Coat of Arms would later be degraded, so that the coat of arms of Denmark would occupy the first field, whilst Norway's was placed in the second.

Arms	Bearer	Description
	King Magnus VII (r. 1319–1343)	Coat of arms as presented in the Gelre Armorial. The royal coat of arms is combined with that of the Bjälbo dynasty, to which Magnus belonged patrilineally. It displays the original crest of the Norwegian coat of arms.
	Queen Margaret I of Denmark (r. 1376–1412)	The Arms of Margaret I of Denmark present in the painting The Stockholm Nationalmuseum. it depicts the heraldry of Denmark (left field), Sweden (right field {House of Bjälbo}) and Norway (escutcheon) with 3 crowns in the center.
	King Eric III (r. 1389–1442)	A modern interpretation of the coat of arms
	King Christopher (r. 1442–1448)	A modern interpretation of the coat of arms. Other versions: Modern interpretation of the coat of arms of King Christopher.

=== Marshalled versions from 1450 until 1814 ===
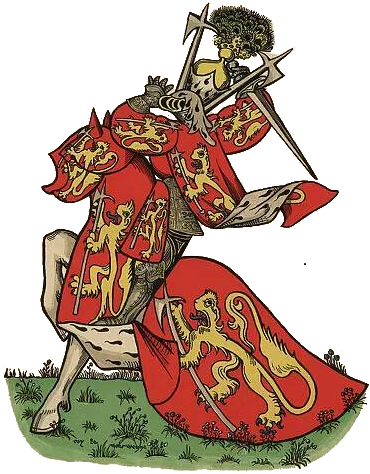
The king's tabard and equestrian arms, depicted in the 15th-c. armorial of the Order of the Golden Fleece.

In 1450, Count Christian of Oldenburg and of Delmenhorst became King of Norway. He was already King of Denmark since 1448, and in 1457, he became King of Sweden as well. Norway's coat of arms was placed in the lower dexter field and, when Sweden left the Kalmar Union in 1523, in the upper sinister field. The latter lasted until 1814.

Varying from time to time, the Kings between 1450 and 1814 bore the coats of arms of the following kingdoms, peoples, and lands:

- County of Oldenburg
- Kingdom of Denmark
- Kingdom of Sweden
- Kingdom of Norway
- Goths
- Wends
- Duchy of Schleswig
- Duchy of Holstein
- Stormarn
- Dithmarschen
- Delmenhorst
- etc.

Shield	Bearer	Description
	King Christian I	A modern interpretation of the coat of arms
	King Christian I King John (Hans); King Christian II	1460–1523. A modern interpretation of the coat of arms
	King Frederick I	A modern interpretation of the coat of arms
	King Christian III	A modern interpretation of the coat of arms
	King Frederick II; King Christian IV; King Frederick III; King Christian V	A modern interpretation of the coat of arms
	King Frederick IV; King Christian VI; King Frederick V King Christian VII; King Frederick VI	A modern interpretation of the coat of arms

=== Marshalled versions from 1814 until 1905 ===
On 4 November 1814, the Norwegian Storting elected King Charles XIII of Sweden as King of Norway. This personal union with Sweden lasted until the dissolution of the union between Norway and Sweden in 1905.

Without legitimate heirs of the body, King Charles adopted the French marshall Bernadotte, Prince of Pontecorvo, who took the name Carl Johan.

The union arms introduced by King Charles XIII and Crown Prince Carl Johan were never used officially in Norway. Only the lion coat of arms of Norway appeared on coins and on seals of official documents signed by the King in his capacity as Norwegian king.

The union arms introduced by King Oscar I in 1844 was used by members of the royal family, by the common diplomatic service of both kingdoms, and on official documents concerning both countries. In Norway, the union arms was never used on coins or official documents.

In Sweden, Crown Princes and Princes bore the coat of arms belonging to his duchy. See Duchies in Sweden (but these titles and arms were never used in Norway).

Union Arms (not used extensively in Norway)
Arms	Year	Description
	1814–1818	King Charles II A modern interpretation of the coat of arms
	1818–1844	King Charles III John A modern interpretation of the coat of arms
Coat of Arms of the Union between Sweden and Norway	1844–1905	King Oscar I (1844–1859) King Charles IV (1859–1872); King Oscar II (1872–1905); A modern interpretation of the coat of arms

=== Since 1814 ===
The halberd was officially discarded and the shorter axe reintroduced by Royal Order in Council 10 July 1844, when an authorised design was instituted for the first time. On 14 December 1905 the official design for royal and government arms was again changed, this time reverting to the medieval pattern, with a triangular escutcheon and a more upright heraldic lion. The painter Eilif Peterssen was responsible for the design.

Arms	Bearer	Description
	King Charles II (r. 1814–1818); King Charles III John (r. 1818–1844)	All achievements are not displayed. A modern interpretation of the coat of arms
	King Oscar I (r. 1844–1859); King Charles IV (r. 1859–1872); King Oscar II (r. 1872–1905)	Official design approved 10 July 1844, never used officially with supporters or other elements
	King Haakon VII (r. 1905–1957); King Olav V (r. 1957–1991); King Harald V (r. 1991–2026); King Haakon VIII (r. 2026–now)	Design by Eilif Peterssen 14 December 1905

A variant with additional lion rampant Or, crowned and bearing axe Or with blade Argent in crest. Never used by royal or state authorities.

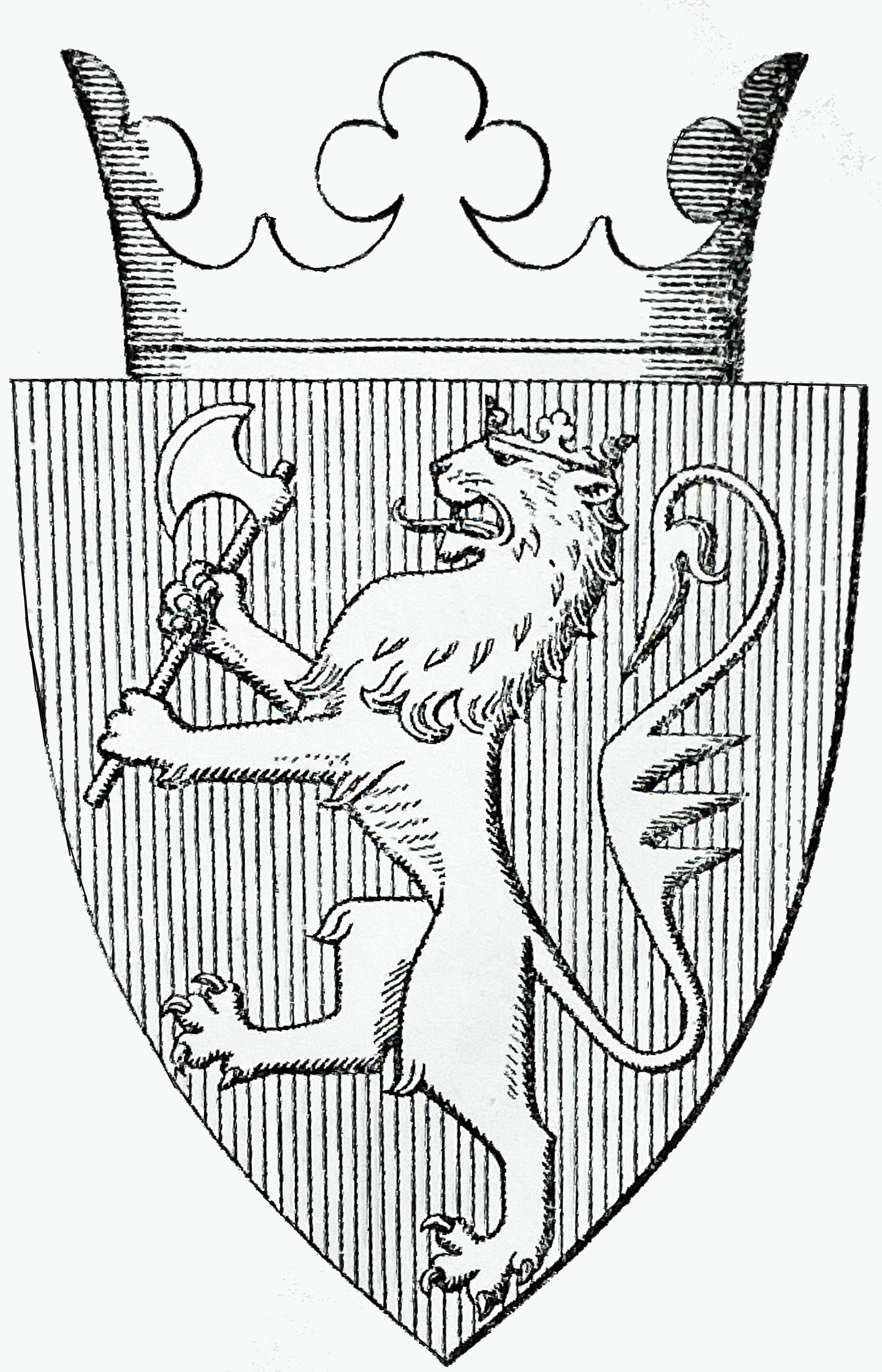
During the Quisling regime under the German occupation of Norway a new design by Harald Damsleth (1906–1971) was introduced in 1944.

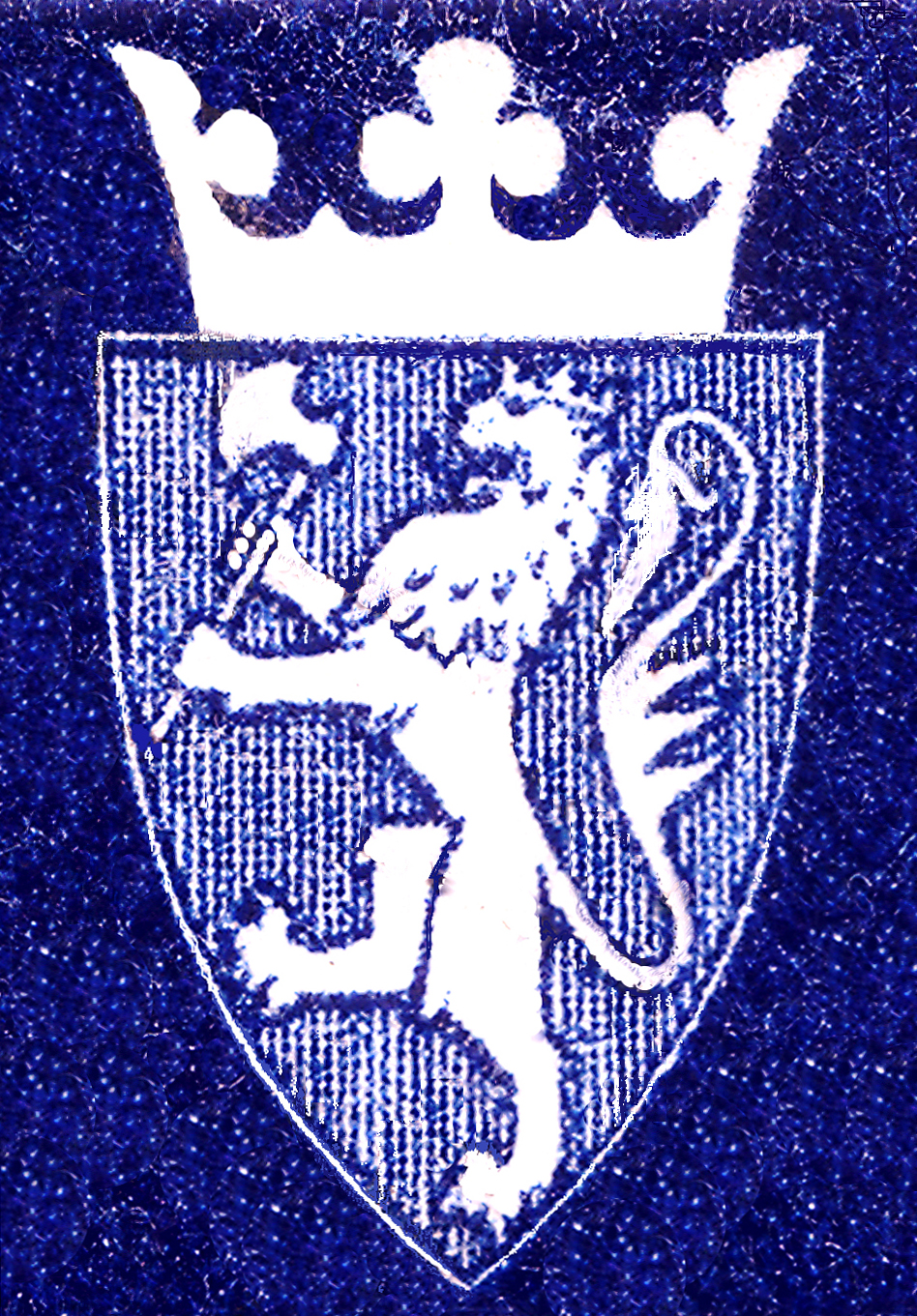
Quisling's version was used on a postage stamp 1n 1944.

Through centuries and following changing fashions in heraldry and arts, the coat of arms has appeared in several ways in the matter of design, shape, and so on. In the late Middle Ages, the axe handle gradually grew longer and came to resemble a halberd. The handle was usually curved in order to fit the shape of the escutcheon (or the changing union quarterings) preferred at the time, and also to match the shape of coins.

The coat of arms has also been used by subordinate state authorities and in semi-official contexts, such as on bank-notes.

== See also ==
- Norwegian battle axe
- Armorial of Norway
- Armorial of Europe
- Great Seal of the Realm

== Literature ==
- P. Petersen: Historisk-heraldisk Fremstilling af Kongeriget Norges Vaaben, og Sammes Afbildning i Bannere, Flag, Mynter og Sigiller, Christiania 1836
- Gustav Storm: Norges gamle Vaaben, Farver og Flag, Kristiania 1894
- Chr. Brinchmann: Norske konge-sigiller og andre fyrste-sigiller fra middelalderen, Kristiania 1924
- Poul Bredo Grandjean: Det danske Rigsvaaben, Copenhagen 1926
- Hallvard Trætteberg: «Norges statssymboler inntil 1814», Historisk Tidsskrift, Vol. 29 No. 8 and 9, Oslo 1933
- Hallvard Trætteberg: Norges våbenmerker. Norske by- og adelsvåben, published by Kaffe Hag, Oslo 1933
- Hallvard Trætteberg: «Norges krone og våpen», i Festskrift til Francis Bull på 50 årsdagen, Oslo 1937
- Hallvard Trætteberg: «The Coat of Arms of Norway», The American-Scandinavian Review, June 1964
- Hallvard Trætteberg: «Det norske kongevåpen i Gelre-våpenboka», Heraldisk Tidsskrift, Vol 3, No 23 p. 126 ff., Copenhagen 1970-74
- Hallvard Trætteberg: «Norges våpen i engelske kilder i middelalderen», Heraldisk Tidsskrift, Vol 3, No 21 p. 29 ff., Copenhagen 1970-74
- Odd Fjordholm: «Om opphavet til det norske løvevåpen. En historiografisk framstilling». Heraldisk Tidsskrift, p. 31-41, Copenhagen 1984
- Hans Cappelen: Heraldikk på norske frimerker Oslo 1988.
- Harald Nissen: «Det norske kongevåpnet», Heraldisk Tidsskrift, Vol10 No 91, Copenhagen March 2005
- Hans Cappelen: «Norge i 1905: Gammelt riksvåpen og nytt kongevåpen», Heraldisk Tidsskrift, Vol 10 No 94, Copenhagen October 2006
- Tom Sverre Vadholm: «Hellig-Olavs øks som norsk symbol», Heraldisk Tidsskrift, Vol 11, No 102, Copenhagen October 2010, p. 59-82
