= Hallvard Trætteberg =

Norwegian heraldic artist

Hallvard Trætteberg (21 April 1898 in Løten Municipality – 21 November 1987 in Oslo) was the leading Norwegian heraldic artist and the expert adviser on heraldry to the Government of Norway and the Norwegian royal family for much of the 20th century. From about 1930 he played a central role in the renewal of public heraldry in Norway with an emphasis on simplification. He gave the coat of arms of Norway a modern design and designed several county and municipal coats of arms, seals of the bishops of the Church of Norway, and monograms. He also wrote several books.

He was a Knight First Class of the Order of St. Olav and a member of L'Académie Internationale d'Héraldique. He was employed at the National Archives of Norway from 1924. Trætteberg was the acting national archivist of Norway from 1963 to 1964.

== Gallery ==
The years shown are the years in which the arms were approved, not necessarily the years in which the arms were designed. If the original drawings are signed with earlier dates, these will be indicated within parentheses. Drawings below may differ slightly from Hallvard Trætteberg's original drawings.

=== County arms ===
Aust-Agder, 1958

Buskerud, 1966 (1965)

Finnmark, 1967 (1966)

Nordland, 1965 (1963)

Rogaland, 1974 (1971)

Telemark, 1970

Troms, 1960 (1959)

Used by Nord-Trøndelag 1956–2018, currently used by Trøndelag county after merger with Sør-Trøndelag in 2018

Vest-Agder, 1958

Vestfold, 1970 (1969)

Østfold, 1958

=== Municipal arms ===
Andøy Municipality, 1983 (1982)

Ballangen Municipality, 1980 (1979)

Bodø Municipality, 1959 (1957)

Eigersund Municipality, 1972

Flora Municipality, 1960 (1959)

Fredrikstad Municipality, 1967

Haugesund Municipality, 1930

Hurum Municipality, 1979 (1978)

Hvaler Municipality, 1983

Kongsberg Municipality, 1972

Levanger Municipality, 1960 (1950)

Lier Municipality, 1970

Løten Municipality, 1984 (1983)

Mandal Municipality, 1921

Melhus Municipality, 1979 (1929) (Note: The arms were originally created in 1929 for the county of Sør-Trøndelag. The county never adopted the arms, but the arms did get adopted a half century later by the municipality of Melhus in 1979.)

Namsos Municipality, 1961

Narvik Municipality, 1951 (1950)

Nes Municipality, 1979 (1978)

Nord-Fron Municipality, 1980 (1978–1979)

Nordkapp Municipality, 1973 (1972)

Odda Municipality, 1982 (Note: While it is certain that Hallvard Trætteberg created the arms, sources suggest that the original idea is from before 1982. The original drawing of the flag is dated 1982, however, the year 1959 is given below in parentheses. The municipal website claims that the arms are "based on an idea from oddarussen 1957". The same website mentions that the arms were approved locally 13-08-1981, the year before its approval by royal resolution 08-10-1982.)

Porsanger Municipality, 1967 (1966)

Ringerike Municipality, 1967 (1966)

Råde Municipality, 1980 (1972)

Sarpsborg Municipality, 1966

Stavanger Municipality, 1939 (Note: The process surrounding the designing and approval of the arms was a long and drawn-out one, which lasted from the end of the 1920s to its approval by royal resolution in 1939. The original drawing of the arms is signed 1932, while the original drawings for the flag and seal both are signed 1930. All three are unusually cluttered with various markings and stamps.)

Steinkjer Municipality, 1957

Stjørdal Municipality, 1983 (1981)

Time Municipality, 1977 (1974)

Tjølling Municipality, 1971 (1970) (no longer official since merging into Larvik Municipality in 1988)

Tromsø Municipality, 1941 (Note: While the arms were originally proposed in 1855, Trætteberg is responsible for the current design which was approved in 1941.)

Vadsø Municipality, 1976 (1975)

Verdal Municipality, 1972 (1971)

Voss Municipality, 1977 (1961)

Vågan Municipality, 1973 (1967/1972)

Ørland Municipality, 1979 (1978)

Øvre Eiker Municipality, 1981

Åsgårdstrand Municipality, 1950 (unofficial since 1965 after the municipality was incorporated into what would eventually become Horten Municipality)

== Publications ==
- Fylkesmerker. Forslag fra Norges Bondelags fylkesmerkenevnd, Oslo 1930
- Norges våbenmerker - Norske by- og adelsvåben, Kaffe Hag AS, Oslo 1933
- "Norges statssymboler inntil 1814", Historisk Tidsskrift, vol. 29, no. 8 and 9, Oslo 1933
- "Norges krone og våpen". I Festskrift til Francis Bull, Oslo 1937
- "Heraldiske farvelover", Meddelanden från Riksheraldikerämbetet, bind 7, Stockholm 1938
- "Statens forhold til heraldikken i Norge", Meddelanden från Riksheraldikerämbetet, bind 7, Stockholm 1938
- "Måne- og stjernevåpen", Meddelelser til slekten Mathiesen, Oslo 1946
- "The Coat of Arms of Norway", The American-Scandinavian Review, June 1964
- Borg i segl, mynt og våpen, Oslo 1967
- "A History of the Flags of Norway", The Flag Bulletin, (XVIII:3), 1978

== Literature ==
- Hallvard Trætteberg - Offentlig heraldikk i Norge 1921-1975 - Våpen flagg segl symboler (Exhibition catalogue)
- Hans Cappelen: Règles pour utilisation des armoiries communales en Norvège. Archivum Heraldicum (1–2) 1976.
- Hans Cappelen: Norwegian Simplicity. The principles of recent public heraldry in Norway. The Coat of Arms, Vol. VII, No. 138, London 1988.
