= State seal =

A state seal is an emblem used to represent the government of a state. Examples include:

== National seals ==
- State Seal of Japan
- State Seal of Myanmar
- Public Seal of Samoa

== Subnational seals ==
- The state seals of the Russian Empire
- The seals of the U.S. states
