= Bearded axe =

Axe with a wide cutting edge, particularly on the lower side of the head

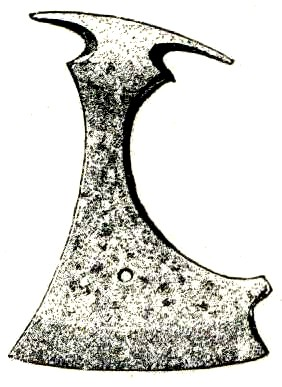
Iron Age bearded axe head from Gotland.

A bearded axe (Old Norse Skeggøx, [Skegg, "beard", and øx, "axe"], Polish topór brodaty, Slovak/Czech bradatice), is any of various axes, used as a tool and weapon, as early as the 6th century AD. This axe was typically used across the entire medieval Europe. The hook or "beard", i.e. the lower portion of the axe bit extending the cutting edge below the width of axe’s butt, provides a wide cutting surface while keeping the overall mass of the axe low. The "beard" of the axe would also have been useful in battle, for example to pull a weapon or shield out of the grasp of an enemy.

Through the Scandinavian mercenaries fighting in the Varangian Guard, the design entered the Byzantine Empire. After the Ottoman conquest of Constantinople, the Sultan's guard adopted axes of similar design to underline their continuity with the Byzantine Empire. In the 15th century, these axes would evolve into single-handed bearded axes with a hammerhead on the head. Through Ottoman influence, these axes would spread to Poland and Hungary.

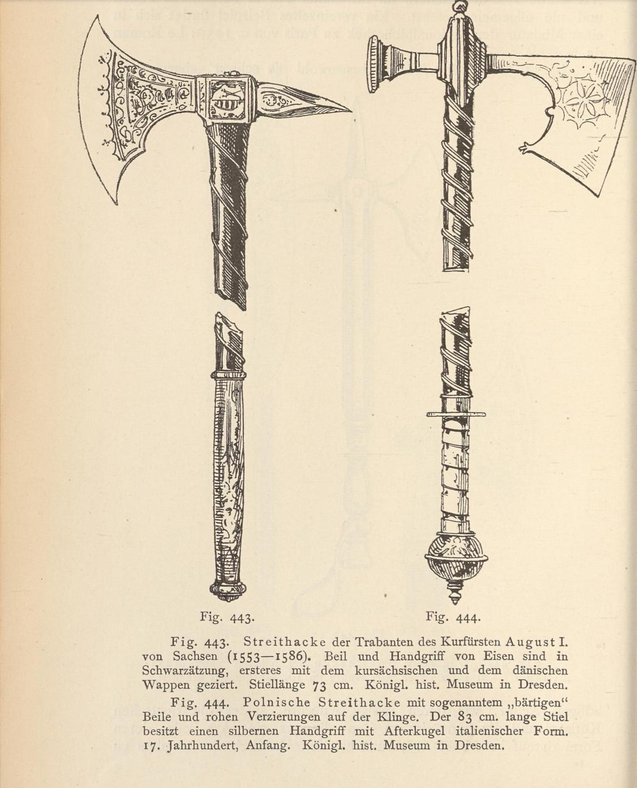
Polish Bearded axe (right) from the 17th century as depicted in Wendelin Boeheim's Handbook of Weaponry

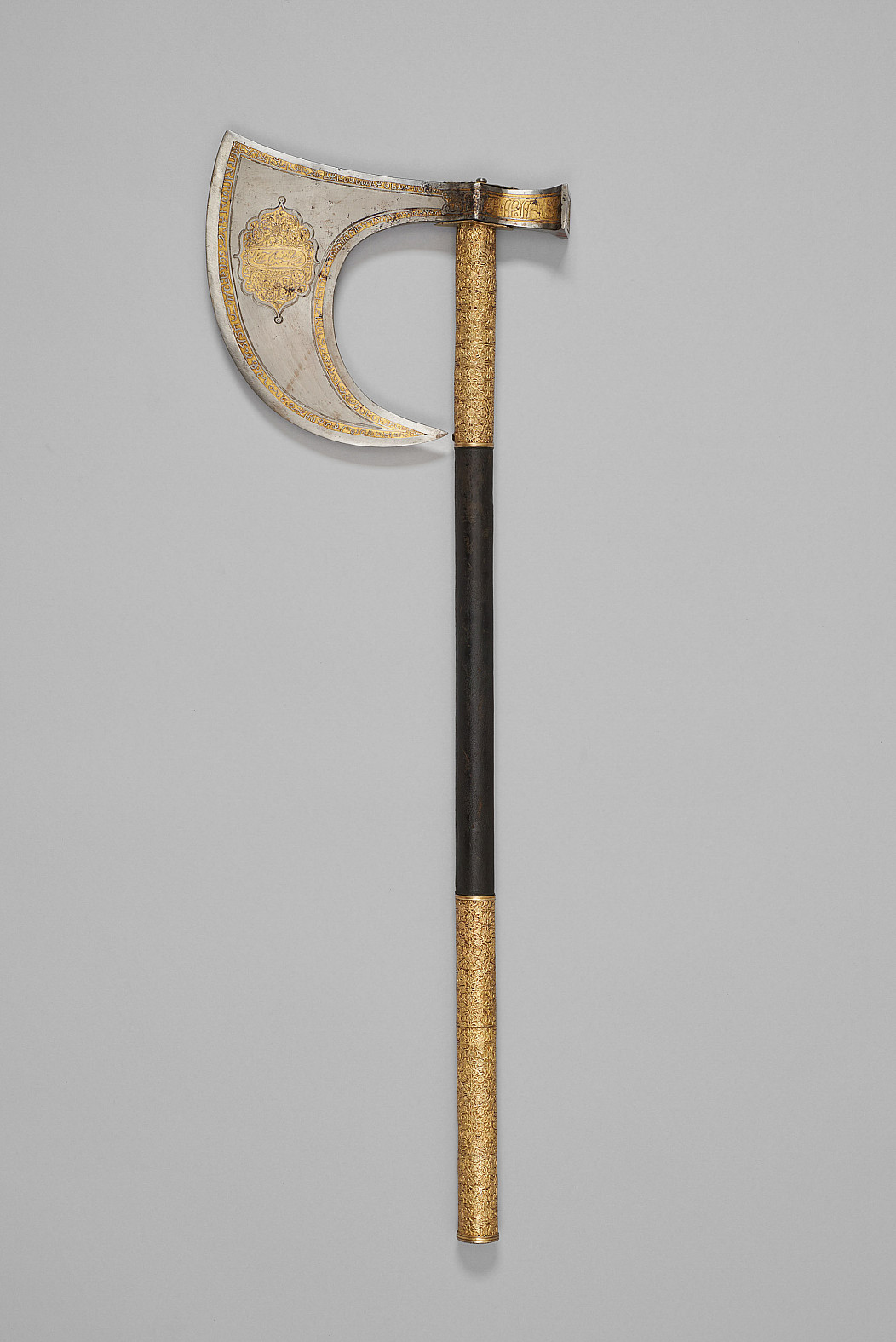
Ornamented Turkisch Bearded-Axe (Czekan) of one of Sultan Mohamed III bodyguards

There are a number of variants in its design.

== See also ==
- Viking Age arms and armor
- Early Middle Ages Europe Slavic Artifacts
- Dane axe
