= A Child's History of England =

Book by Charles Dickens

- Title page of the first edition of A Child's History of England
- Author: Charles Dickens
- Language: English
- Series: Monthly: 25 January 1851 – 10 December 1853
- Genre: History
- Publisher: London: Bradbury & Evans
- Publication date: 1852–1854
- Publication place: England
- Media type: Print (serial, hardback, and paperback)
- Preceded by: Bleak House
- Followed by: Hard Times
- Text: A Child's History of England at Wikisource

A Child's History of England is a book by English author Charles Dickens. It first appeared in serial form in Household Words, running from 25 January 1851 to 10 December 1853. Dickens also published the work in book form in three volumes: the first volume on 20 December 1851, the second on 25 December 1852 and the third on 24 December 1853. Although the volumes were published in December, each was postdated the following year. They bore the titles:

- Volume I – England from the Ancient Times, to the Death of King John (1852)
- Volume II – England from the Reign of Henry the Third, to the Reign of Richard the Third (1853)
- Volume III – England from the Reign of Henry the Seventh to the Revolution of 1688 (1854)

== Contents ==
Dickens dedicated the book to "My own dear children, whom I hope it may help, bye and bye, to read with interest larger and better books on the same subject." The history covered the period between 50 BC and 1689, ending with a short chapter summarising events from 1689 until the accession of Queen Victoria in 1837. In a letter to his friend Douglas William Jerrold, Dickens confessed that he was composing the book so that he could prevent his children from embracing conservatism:

I am writing a little history of England for my boy ... For I don't know what I should do if he were to get hold of any conservative or High Church notions; and the best way of guarding against any such horrible result is, I take it, to wring the parrot's neck in his very cradle.

A Child's History was included in the curricula of British schoolchildren well into the 20th century, with successive editions published from 1851 to World War II.
