= Armorial of sovereign states =

This is a gallery of the armorial of sovereign states. It shows the coat of arms, national emblem, or seal of every sovereign state.

Note that in some countries, such as Canada, New Zealand, Qatar, Singapore, South Africa, and the United Kingdom, the official rendition of the coat of arms is copyrighted, and therefore the use of these official renditions is restricted on Wikipedia. In these cases, they are represented in this page by renditions based on their blazons, which are nonetheless faithful to their heraldic descriptions.

== A ==
Emblem of Afghanistan

Coat of arms of Albania

Emblem of Algeria

Coat of arms of Andorra

Emblem of Angola

Coat of arms of Antigua and Barbuda

Coat of arms of Argentina

Coat of arms of Armenia

Coat of arms of Australia

Coat of arms of Austria

Emblem of Azerbaijan

== B ==
Coat of arms of the Bahamas

Coat of arms of Bahrain

Emblem of Bangladesh

Government seal of Bangladesh

Coat of arms of Barbados

National emblem of Belarus

Greater coat of arms of Belgium

Coat of arms of Belize

Coat of arms of Benin

Emblem of Bhutan

Coat of arms of Bolivia

Coat of arms of Bosnia and Herzegovina

Coat of arms of Botswana

Coat of arms of Brazil

National seal of Brazil

Emblem of Brunei

Coat of arms of Bulgaria

Coat of arms of Burkina Faso

Coat of arms of Burundi

== C ==
Royal arms of Cambodia

Coat of arms of Cameroon

Coat of arms of Canada

National emblem of Cape Verde

Coat of arms of the Central African Republic

Coat of arms of Chad

Coat of arms of Chile

National Emblem of Taiwan (Republic of China)

National Emblem of the People's Republic of China

Coat of arms of Colombia

National seal of the Comoros

Coat of arms of the Democratic Republic of the Congo

Coat of arms of the Republic of the Congo

Coat of arms of Costa Rica

Coat of arms of Croatia

Coat of arms of Cuba

Coat of arms of Cyprus

Coat of arms of the Czech Republic

== D ==
Greater royal coat of arms of Denmark

Coat of arms of Denmark

Emblem of Djibouti

Coat of arms of Dominica

Coat of arms of the Dominican Republic

== E ==
Coat of arms of Ecuador

Coat of arms of Egypt

Coat of arms of El Salvador

Coat of arms of Equatorial Guinea

Emblem of Eritrea

Coat of arms of Estonia

Coat of arms of Eswatini

Emblem of Ethiopia

== F ==
Coat of arms of Fiji

Coat of arms of Finland

Emblem of France (unofficial)

== G ==
Coat of arms of Gabon

Coat of arms of the Gambia

Coat of arms of Georgia

Coat of arms of Germany

Coat of arms of Ghana

Coat of arms of Greece

Coat of arms of Grenada

Coat of arms of Guatemala

Coat of arms of Guinea

Coat of arms of Guinea-Bissau

Coat of arms of Guyana

== H ==
Coat of arms of Haiti

Coat of arms of Honduras

Coat of arms of Hungary

== I ==
Coat of arms of Iceland

Emblem of India

Emblem of Indonesia

Emblem of Iran

Coat of arms of Iraq

Coat of arms of Ireland

Emblem of Israel

Emblem of Italy

Coat of arms of Ivory Coast

== J ==
Coat of arms of Jamaica

Imperial Seal of Japan (32-fold chrysanthemum)

Coat of arms of Jordan

== K ==
Emblem of Kazakhstan

Coat of arms of Kenya

Coat of arms of Kiribati

Emblem of North Korea

Emblem of South Korea

Emblem of Kuwait

Emblem of Kyrgyzstan

== L ==
Emblem of Laos

Coat of arms of Latvia

Coat of arms of Lesotho

Coat of arms of Liberia

Coat of arms of Liechtenstein

Coat of arms of Lithuania

Coat of arms of Luxembourg

Lebanon has no official coat of arms, while Libya has not had an official coat of arms since 2011.

== M ==
Seal of Madagascar

Coat of arms of Malawi

Coat of arms of Malaysia

Emblem of Maldives

Emblem of Mali

Coat of arms of Malta

Seal of the Marshall Islands

Seal of Mauritania

Coat of arms of Mauritius

Coat of arms of Mexico

Seal of the Federated States of Micronesia

Coat of arms of Moldova

Coat of arms of Monaco

Emblem of Mongolia

Coat of arms of Montenegro

Coat of arms of Morocco

Emblem of Mozambique

State seal of Myanmar

== N ==
Coat of arms of Namibia

Coat of arms of Nauru

Emblem of Nepal

Coat of arms of the Netherlands

Coat of arms of New Zealand

Coat of arms of Nicaragua

Coat of arms of Niger

Coat of arms of Nigeria

Coat of arms of North Macedonia

Greater royal coat of arms of Norway

Coat of arms of Norway

== O ==
National emblem of Oman

== P ==
State emblem of Pakistan

Seal of Palau

Coat of arms of Palestine

Coat of arms of Panama

Emblem of Papua New Guinea

Coat of arms of Paraguay (Obverse)

Coat of arms of Paraguay (Reverse)

Coat of arms of Peru (Escudo Nacional)

Coat of arms of the Philippines

Coat of arms of Poland

Coat of arms of Portugal

== Q ==
Emblem of Qatar

== R ==
Coat of arms of Romania

Coat of arms of Russia

Seal of Rwanda

== S ==
Coat of arms of Saint Kitts and Nevis

Coat of arms of Saint Lucia

Coat of arms of Saint Vincent and the Grenadines

Coat of arms of Samoa

Coat of arms of San Marino

Coat of arms of São Tomé and Príncipe

Emblem of Saudi Arabia

Coat of arms of Senegal

Coat of arms of Serbia

Coat of arms of Seychelles

Coat of arms of Sierra Leone

Coat of arms of Singapore

Coat of arms of Slovakia

Coat of arms of Slovenia

Coat of arms of Solomon Islands

Coat of arms of Somalia

Coat of arms of South Africa

Coat of arms of South Sudan

Coat of arms of Spain

Emblem of Sri Lanka

Emblem of Sudan

Coat of arms of Suriname

Greater coat of arms of Sweden

Lesser coat of arms of Sweden

Coat of arms of Switzerland

Emblem of Syria

== T ==
Emblem of Tajikistan

Coat of arms of Tanzania

Emblem of Thailand

National emblem of Timor-Leste

Coat of arms of Togo

Coat of arms of Tonga

Coat of arms of Trinidad and Tobago

Coat of arms of Tunisia

Emblem of Turkmenistan

Coat of arms of Tuvalu

Turkey does not have a coat of arms or an official emblem.

== U ==
Coat of arms of Uganda

Coat of arms of Ukraine

Emblem of the United Arab Emirates

Coat of arms of the United Kingdom (outside Scotland)

Coat of arms of the United Kingdom, for use in Scotland

Great Seal of the United States (obverse)

Great Seal of the United States (reverse)

Coat of arms of Uruguay

Emblem of Uzbekistan

== V ==
Coat of arms of Vanuatu

Coat of arms of Vatican City

Umbraculum (used by the Vatican City only during sede vacante)

Coat of arms of Venezuela

Emblem of Vietnam

== Y ==
Emblem of Yemen

== Z ==
Coat of arms of Zambia

Coat of arms of Zimbabwe

== Other states ==
Emblem of Abkhazia

Coat of arms of the Cook Islands

Coat of arms of Kosovo

Coat of arms of Niue

Coat of arms of Northern Cyprus

Coat of arms of the Sahrawi Arab Democratic Republic

National emblem of Somaliland

Coat of arms of South Ossetia

Coat of arms of Transnistria

== See also ==
- Armorial of dependent territories
- Gallery of flags of dependent territories
- Armorial of Africa
- Armorial of North America
- Armorial of South America
- Armorial of Asia
- Armorial of Europe
- Armorial of Oceania
- Gallery of sovereign state flags
