= Armorial of Africa =

List of national coat of arms

African countries use the following coats of arms or national emblems:

== Sovereign states ==
Country	Coat of arms	Blazon	Motto/Text	Main article
Algeria		Copper, the Star and crescent in front of the Hand of Fatima and the Atlas mountains, below a rising sun, surrounded by buildings and plants, or.	الجمهورية الجزائرية الديمقراطية الشعبية; Al Jumhūriyyah al Jazā'iriyyah ad Dīmuqrāţiyyah ash Shabiyyah (Arabic: "People's Democratic Republic of Algeria")	Emblem of Algeria
Angola		Azure, a hoe and machete crossed atop a rising sun and below a five-pointed star, or, surrounded by a segment of a cogwheel and sheaves of maize, coffee and cotton. "República de Angola" in black on a beige half-tone scroll.	República de Angola (Portuguese: "Republic of Angola")	Emblem of Angola
Benin		Chief two cornucopias sable, ears of corn coming therefrom; Quarterly I. Argent, a Somba castle or; II. Argent, the Star of Benin proper, which is a Maltese cross azure, anglé of rays argent and in fess point sable; III. Argent, a palm tree vert charged with a fruit gules; IV. Argent, a ship sable sailing on a sea azure with a sewn upon the line of quartering a lozenge gules; dexter and sinister two leopards or as supporters.	Fraternité, Justice, Travail (French: "Brotherhood, Justice, Work")	Coat of arms of Benin
Botswana		Argent three barrulets wavy in fess Azure between in chief three cogwheels proper, one above engaged with two below and in base a bull's head caboshed proper, and for the supporters on either side a zebra the dexter supporting a white elephant's tusk the sinister a green stalk of sorghum and brown sorghum head with white grains proper. Motto "Pula" in black on a Botswana blue half tone scroll. The reverse side of the scroll is red.	Pula (Setswana: "Rain")	Coat of arms of Botswana
Burkina Faso		one escutcheon bearing in the chief on a ribband argent the name of the country: "BURKINA FASO";in fess point an inescutcheon of two bands in fess with the banner of arms, sewn upon two crossed spears;two stallions rampant argent supporting on each side the escutcheon; in base, an open book; below, two stalks of millet with three pairs of green leaves in crescent coming from the bottom, and equidistant to the vertical passing through the points of the shield and the upper ray of the star of the flag, crossed and connected in their bases with a ribbon bearing the motto of the country "La Patrie ou la Mort, nous vaincrons	Burkina Faso - La Patrie ou la Mort, nous vaincrons (French: "Fatherland or death, we shall overcome"")	Coat of arms of Burkina Faso
Burundi			Unité, Travail, Progrès (French: "Unity, Work, Progress")	Coat of arms of Burundi
Cabo Verde			República de Cabo Verde (Portuguese: "Republic of Cabo Verde")	National emblem of Cape Verde
Cameroon			Paix, Travail, Patrie (French: Peace, Work, Fatherland)	Coat of arms of Cameroon
Central African Republic		Quarterly; first: vert, an elephant's head cabossed argent; second: argent, a tree eradicated vert; third: Or, three mullets of four points sable, one and two, each charged with a roundel argent; fourth: azure, a hand couped pointing to dexter chief gules. Upon an inescutcheon gules a roundel argent charged with a map of Africa sable surmounted by a mullet Or.	Unité, Dignité, Travail (French: "Unity, Dignity, Work")	Coat of arms of the Central African Republic
Chad		Barry dancetty of eight Or and Azure	Unité, Travail, Progrès (French: "Unity, Work, Progress")	Coat of arms of Chad
Comoros			Unité, Solidarité, Développement (French: "Unity, Solidarity, Development") Also features the state's name in French and Arabic	National seal of the Comoros
Democratic Republic of the Congo			Justice, Paix, Travail (French: "Justice, Peace, Work")	Emblem of the Democratic Republic of the Congo
Djibouti			None	Emblem of Djibouti
Egypt			جمهورية مصر العربية; Jumhūriyyat Miṣr al-ʿArabiyya (Arabic: "Arab Republic of Egypt")	Coat of arms of Egypt
Equatorial Guinea		Argent, a Silk cotton tree proper	Unidad, Paz, Justicia (Spanish: "Unity, Peace, Justice")	Coat of arms of Equatorial Guinea
Eritrea			ኤርትራ—ሃገረ ኤርትራ; Hagere ʾErtra (Tigrinya: "The State of Eritrea"); The State of Eritrea دولة إرتريا; Dawlat ʾIritriyā (Arabic: "The State of Eritrea")	Emblem of Eritrea
Eswatini		Azure, a Swazi battle shield with decorations, all proper	Siyinqaba (Swazi: "We are the fortress")	Coat of arms of Eswatini
Ethiopia		Azure, a pentagram emanating five rays or.	None	Emblem of Ethiopia
Gabon		Or, a ship sable, masts of the same, with the flag of Gabon, tierced in fess vert, or and azure, sailing upon a sea azure; a chief vert charged with three bezants.	Union, Travail, Justice (French: Union, Work, Justice)	Coat of arms of Gabon
The Gambia		Azure, a Locar axe and a Mandinka Hoe in saltire Or, a Bordure parted per bordure Vert and Argent	Progress, Peace, Prosperity	Coat of arms of the Gambia
Ghana		Azure on a cross vert fimbriated Or a lion passant guardant Or, in the first quarter a linguist's staff and ceremonial sword crossed in saltire Or, in the second quarter issuant from five bars wavy Argent and Azure a castle Argent upon a mount Or, in the third quarter affixed in a grassy plain a cocoa tree proper and in the fourth quarter upon a grassy plain a mine proper.	Freedom and Justice	Coat of arms of Ghana
Guinea			Travail, Justice, Solidarité (French: "Work, Justice, Solidarity")	Coat of arms of Guinea
Guinea-Bissau			Unidade, Luta, Progresso (Portuguese: "Unity, Struggle, Progress")	Emblem of Guinea-Bissau
Ivory Coast		Vert, an elephant's head couped or, armed argent	République de Côte d'Ivoire (French: "Republic of Cote d'Ivoire")	Coat of arms of Ivory Coast
Kenya		Per fess sable and vert, on a fess gules fimbriated argent a cock grasping in the dexter claw an axe also argent.	Harambee (Swahili: "Let us all pull together")	Coat of arms of Kenya
Lesotho			Khotso, Pula, Nala (Sotho: "Peace, Rain, Prosperity")	Coat of arms of Lesotho
Liberia			The Love of Liberty Brought Us Here; Republic of Liberia	Coat of arms of Liberia
Madagascar			Tanindrazana, Fahafahana, Fandrosoana (Malagasy: "Ancestral land, Liberty, Progress")	Seal of Madagascar
Malawi		Per Fess Barry wavy Azure and Argent; A Fess Gules a lion passant Or; In base Sable a sun rising Or	Unity and Freedom	Coat of arms of Malawi
Mali			Un Peuple, Un But, Une Foi (French: "One People, One Goal, One Faith")	Coat of arms of Mali
Mauritania			"Islamic Republic of Mauritania" in Arabic and French	Seal of Mauritania
Mauritius		Quarterly azure and or: (1) A lymphad or; (2) 3 palm trees vert; (3) A key in pale the wards downwards gules; (4) From the base a pile, and in chief a mullet argent	Stella Clavisque Maris Indici (Latin: "Star and Key of the Indian Ocean")	Coat of arms of Mauritius
Morocco		Gules, in chief a demi-sun setting, with 15 rays or on a background azure, supported by a fess in bar enarched vert, fusily or and argent; the whole surcharged by an interlaced pentalpha vert on a background gules.	إِنْ تَنْصُرُوا اللهَ يَنْصُرُكُمْ (Arabic) ʾIn tanṣurūw Allāha yanṣurukum (transliteration) "If you glorify Allah, He will glorify you"	Coat of arms of Morocco
Mozambique			República de Moçambique	Emblem of Mozambique
Namibia		Tierced per bend sinister Azure, and Vert, a bend sinister Gules fimbriated Argent and in dexter chief a Sun with twelve straight rays Or charged with an annulet Azure	Unity, Liberty, Justice	Coat of arms of Namibia
Niger		Vert, a sun rayonned or, accosted to dexter with a spear in pale charged with two Touareg swords in saltire, and to sinister with three ears of millet, one in pale and two in saltire, accompanied in point with a head of zebu, all or	Republique du Niger (French: "Republic of Niger")	Coat of arms of Niger
Nigeria		Sable a Pall wavy argent	Unity and Faith - Peace and Progress	Coat of arms of Nigeria
Republic of the Congo		Or, a fess wavy Vert, a lion rampant Gules, armed and langued Vert, overall, maintaining a torch Sable flamed Gules.	Unité, Travail, Progrès (French: "Unity, Work, Progress")	Coat of arms of the Republic of the Congo
Rwanda			Ubumwe, Umurimo, Gukunda Igihugu (Kinyarwanda: "Unity, Work, Patriotism")	Seal of Rwanda
São Tomé and Príncipe		Or, a palm eradicated proper	Unidade, Disciplina, Trabalho (Portuguese: "Unity, discipline, work")	Coat of arms of São Tomé and Príncipe
Senegal		Per pale, the first Gules a lion rampant Or, the second Or, a baobab-tree proper and in base a fess wavy Vert	Un Peuple, Un But, Une Foi (French: "One People, One Goal, One Faith")	Coat of arms of Senegal
Seychelles		Azure, a Female Sea coconut palm (Lodoicea maldivica) issuant from the base a grassy mount thereon a Giant Tortoise (Testudo gigantea) the whole in front of water rising therefrom to the dexter an Island and sailing thereon a two-masted Schooner in full sail all proper.	Finis Coronat Opus (Latin: The End Crowns the Work)	Coat of arms of Seychelles
Sierra Leone		Vert a lion passant Or armed and langued Gules standing on a base Argent, two bars wavy Azure, and a chief indented of four points Argent, three flaming torches Sable, its flames Gules	Unity, Freedom, Justice	Coat of arms of Sierra Leone
Somalia			None	Coat of arms of Somalia
South Africa		Or, representations of two San human figures of red ochre, statant respectant, the hands of the innermost arms clasped, with upper arm, inner wrist, waist and knee bands Argent, and a narrow border of red ochre	ǃke e꞉ ǀxarra ǁke (ǀXam: "Unity In Diversity") (literally "Diverse People Unite")	Coat of arms of South Africa
South Sudan			Justice, Liberty, Prosperity	Coat of arms of South Sudan
Sudan			Al-Nasr Lana النصر لنا (Arabic: "Victory is Ours")	Emblem of Sudan
Tanzania		On a native shield, per fess of four: Or, the top part of a Torch enflamed proper; Flag of Tanzania: Per bend sinister Vert and Azure, a bend sinister Sable, fimbriated Or; Gules, an Axe and Hatchet in saltire Or; Barry wavy Argent and Azure; over all a Spear over an Axe and Hatchet in saltire, all Or.	Uhuru na Umoja (Swahili: "Freedom and Unity")	Coat of arms of Tanzania
Togo			Travail, Liberté, Patrie (French: "Work, Liberty, Homeland")	Coat of arms of Togo
Tunisia			نظام، حرية، عدالة (Arabic); Niẓām, Ḥurrīyah, 'Adālah (transliteration) "Order, Freedom, Justice"	Coat of arms of Tunisia
Uganda		Sable, upon the fess point a sun in splendour and in base a Uganda drum Or, the skin and guy ropes Argent, a chief barry wavy of six Azure and Argent. Behind the shield two Uganda spears of estate in saltire proper.	For God and My Country	Coat of arms of Uganda
Zambia		Sable six pallets wavy Argent	One Zambia, One Nation	Coat of arms of Zambia
Zimbabwe		Vert, a representation of a portion of the Great Zimbabwe proper (Malvern 2021); on a chief argent seven palets wavy azure.	Unity, Freedom, Work	Coat of arms of Zimbabwe

== States with limited recognition ==
Country	Coat of arms	Motto	Main article	Other claimants
Sahrawi Arab Democratic Republic		Ḥurrīyyah, Dīmuqrāṭīyyah, Wiḥdah حرية ديمقراطية وحدة (Arabic: "Liberty, Democracy, Unity")	Coat of arms of Western Sahara	Morocco
Somaliland		In the name of Allah, Most Gracious, Most Merciful	National emblem of Somaliland	Somaliland

== Dependencies, autonomous regions, autonomous cities and other territories ==
Country	Territory		Coat of arms	Motto	Main article
France	Mayotte			"Ra Hachiri" (Shimaore: "We are vigilant")	Coat of arms of Mayotte
France	Réunion			"Florebo quocumque ferar" (Latin: "I will flourish wherever I am brought")	Coat of arms of Réunion
United Kingdom	Saint Helena, Ascension and Tristan da Cunha	Saint Helena		Loyal and Unshakeable	Coat of arms of Saint Helena
United Kingdom	Saint Helena, Ascension and Tristan da Cunha	Ascension Island		(None)	Coat of arms of Ascension Island
United Kingdom	Saint Helena, Ascension and Tristan da Cunha	Tristan da Cunha		Our Faith is Our Strength	Coat of arms of Tristan da Cunha
Tanzania	Zanzibar (autonomous region of Tanzania)			"Serikali ya Mapinduzi, Zanzibar" (English: Revolutionary Government, Zanzibar)	Coat of arms of Zanzibar

== See also ==
- Flags of Africa
- Armorial of sovereign states
- Armorial of North America
- Armorial of South America
- Armorial of Asia
- Armorial of Europe
- Armorial of Oceania
