= List of CAF national association football teams by nickname =

The following is a list of nicknames of Confederation of African Football (CAF) national association football teams.

== Nicknames ==
=== Men's ===
- Nicknames in italics are commonly used in English.

Team	Nickname	English translation	Notes	Ref.
Algeria	الأفناك; Les Fennecs	The Fennecs	The fennec fox is the national animal of Algeria.	
Algeria	محاربي الصحراء; Les Guerriers du Désert	The Desert Warriors	Algeria is more than 80% desert.	
Angola	Palancas Negras	Sable antelopes	The Giant sable antelope, found mostly in Angola, is its national symbol.	
Benin	Les Écureuils	The Squirrels	Benin chose the Squirrels nickname to reflect a small nation aiming to climb high. The phrase was coined in the 1960s.	
Botswana	Dipitse	The Zebras	The Zebra is the national Animal of Botswana. Two zebras adorn the Botswanan coat of arms, which shows that the animal is a symbol of national unity.	
Burkina Faso	Les Étalons	The Stallions	The white stallion is the national symbol of Burkina Faso and it has 2 white stallions in its coat of arms.	
Burundi	Les Hirondelles	Burundi Swallows	The Angola swallow is a species of a swallow that is native in the African tropical environment. It is found in Angola, Burundi, Democratic Republic of the Congo, Gabon, Kenya, Malawi, Namibia, Rwanda, Tanzania, Uganda, and Zambia.	
Cameroon	Lions Indomptables	Indomitable Lions	The national animal of Cameroon is the Lion and is a symbol of strength, power, and rules. Indomitable means unable to defeat.	
Cape Verde	Tubarões Azuis	Blue Sharks	"Blue" is for the colour of the main jersey. Cape Verde is an island.	
Central African Republic	Les Fauves	The Big Cats or The Wild Beasts	Northern Central African Republic historically supported some the most pristine wilderness and intact and abundant wildlife assemblages in Africa, including species of global importance such as the big cats.	
Chad	Les Sao	The Sao	The Sao Civilization is the ancestorial people of the current day Chad population.	
Comoros	Les Coelecantes	The Coelacanths	The coelacanth is a type of fish.	
Congo	Diables Rouges	Red Devils	From their all red uniform kits.	
Djibouti	Riverains de la Mer Rouge	Shoremen of the Red Sea	Once a French colony it borders the Red Sea and the Gulf of Aden in the east and its most important commercial activities revolve around the country's free trade policies and strategic location as a Red Sea transit point.	
DR Congo	Les Léopards	The Leopards	Home to a large population of African leopards. The coat of arms depicts a leopard head.	
Egypt	الفراعنة	The Pharaohs	Pharaoh was the common title of the monarchs of ancient Egypt.	
Equatorial Guinea	Nzalang Nacional	The National Thunder	From the Equatorial climate of thunderstorms.	
Eritrea	ኣግማል ቀይሕ ባሕሪ	Red Sea Camels	From the national emblem of Eritrea which was adopted on 24 May 1993 on the occasion of Eritrea's declaration of independence from Ethiopia. The emblem mainly depicts a camel surrounded by a wreath of laurel.	
Eswatini	Sihalngu Semnikati	King's Shield	Formerly Swaziland, The Swazi battle shield appears on the Swazi national flag and other flags related to Zulus.	
Ethiopia	Walyas		The walia is a species of ibex indigenous to Ethiopia.	
Gabon	Les Panthères	The Panthers	The black panther is Gabon's national animal.	
Gambia	Scorpions		The emperor scorpion, also known as the Pandinus imperator, is a species of scorpion native to rainforests and savannas in West Africa, especially in Gambia. It is one of the largest scorpions in the world and lives for 6–8 years.	
Ghana	Black Stars		The Black Star is regarded as the national symbol of Ghana.	
Guinea	Syli National	National Elephants	Guinea is home to the African elephant and a former coat of arms in 1960 featured a red and yellow shield with a green elephant on it.	
Guinea-Bissau	Djurtus	The African wild dogs	The African wild dog is native to Africa, including Guinea-Bissau.	
Ivory Coast	Les Éléphants	The Elephants	From the African forest elephants which are abundant in the Ivory Coast.	
Kenya	Harambee Stars		"Harambee" is Kenya's official motto and is present in its coat of arms. It means "Let's all pull together" in Swahili.	
Lesotho	Likuena	Crocodiles	From the coat of arms of Lesotho which is a crocodile on a Basotho shield.	
Liberia	Lone Stars		The Lone Stars is the official nickname of Liberia once associated with the United States.	
Libya	فرسان المتوسط	The Mediterranean Knights	From the 16th century Knights who policed the Mediterranean and assumed responsibility of its traditional protectors.	
Madagascar	Les Baréa	The Barea	A species of zebu.	
Malawi	The Flames		From the Malawian flag with flames of a rising sun.	
Mali	Les Aigles	The Eagles	From the traditional hunting eagles of the Tuareg.	
Mauritania	المرابطون	The Almoravids	From the Almoravid dynasty which was an imperial Berber Muslim dynasty centered in Morocco. It established an empire in the 11th century that stretched over the western Maghreb and Al-Andalus.	
Mauritius	Club M		Reference to the initial for Mauritius.	
Mauritius	Les Dodos	The Dodos	An extinct bird endemic to Mauritius.	
Morocco	أسود الأطلس; Les Lions de l'Atlas	The Atlas Lions	From the Barbary lion which is a Panthera lion population in North Africa.	
Mozambique	Os Mambas	The Mambas	The most venomous snake in Africa.	
Namibia	Brave Warriors		From the indigenous warriors of Namibia including the Herero warriors.	
Niger	Le Mena	The Mena	A species of antelope.	
Nigeria	Super Eagles		From the country's crest which has the eagle which represents strength	
Réunion	Club R		In reference to the initial for Réunion.	
Rwanda	Amavubi	The Wasps	From the African wasp found in Rwanda.	
São Tomé and Príncipe	Os Verde-Amarelos	The Green-Yellows	From the country's flag which is green and yellow.	
Senegal	Les Lions de la Téranga	The Lions of Teranga	Teranga is a word that you hear a lot in Senegal. It's a Wolof word, meaning hospitality or welcoming generosity. The Senegalese coat of arms features a lion.	
Seychelles	The Seychelles Pirates		The countless islands of Seychelles were known to harbor pirates and corsairs in the 1800s	
Sierra Leone	The Leones Stars		From the shortened country name.	
Somalia	Ocean Stars		From the blue and star on its flag and its neighboring of the Indian Ocean.	
South Africa	Bafana Bafana	Boys Boys	"Bafana Bafana" is a nickname given to the national side by its fans. It is Zulu and translates literally as "the boys, the boys". Its actual meaning in Zulu is, "Go boys"	
South Sudan	The Bright Stars		The bright star on the Sudan flag.	
Sudan	صقور الجديان	Falcons of Jediane (The Secretarybirds)	The secretarybird is an important bird in Sudanese culture it is found in its emblem and coat of arms.	
Sudan	Nile Crocodiles		The Nile crocodile is a large crocodilian native to freshwater habitats in Africa, where it is present in 26 countries including Sudan.	
Tanzania	Kilimanjaro Stars		Kilimanjaro with its three volcanic cones, Kibo, Mawenzi, and Shira, is a dormant volcano in Tanzania. It is the highest mountain in Africa.	
Tanzania	Taifa Stars		Taifa translates to "Nation" in Swahili.	
Togo	Les Éperviers	The Sparrow hawks	The Eurasian sparrowhawk, also known as the northern sparrowhawk or simply the sparrowhawk, is a small bird of prey in the family Accipitridae. It is found in Togo.	
Tunisia	نسور قرطاج; Les Aigles de Carthage	Eagles of Carthage	The Carthaginian Empire extended over much of the coast of Northwest Africa as well as encompassing substantial parts of coastal Iberia and the islands of the western Mediterranean Sea part of which is modern-day Tunisia.	
Uganda	The Cranes		The Golden crested crane is the national bird of Uganda.	
Zambia	Chipolopolo	The Copper Bullets	Copper mining is the major economic activity in Zambia.	
Zambia	KK 11		Used during the 1980s, after the founding president Kenneth Kaunda.	
Zanzibar	Zanzibar Heroes		From the Island name.	
Zanzibar	The Leopards		The Zanzibar leopard is an extirpated leopard population on Unguja Island in the Zanzibar archipelago.	
Zimbabwe	The Warriors		From the historic warrior spirit of the indigenous Zimbabwe.	

=== Women's ===
Team	Nickname	English translation	Notes	Ref.
Algeria	الأفناك	The The Fennecs	The fennec fox is the national animal of Algeria.	
Angola	The Welwitschias		The Welwitschia mirabilis is the national flower of Angola.	
Botswana	The Mares		The Zebra is the national Animal of Botswana. Two zebras adorn the Botswana coat of arms, which shows that the animal is a symbol of national unity. A female Zebra is called a mare.	
Burkina Faso	Étalons Dames	Lady Stallions	The white stallion is the national symbol of Burkina Faso and it has 2 white stallions in its coat of arms.	
Burundi	Les Hirondelles	Swallows	The Angolan swallow is a species of a swallow that is native in the African tropical environment. It is found in Angola, Burundi, Democratic Republic of the Congo, Gabon, Kenya, Malawi, Namibia, Rwanda, Tanzania, Uganda, and Zambia.	
Cameroon	Lionnes Indomptables	Indomitable Lionesses	The national animal of Cameroon is the mighty Lion. The Lion is the symbol of strength, power, and rules. Indomitable means unable to defeat.	
DR Congo	Léopards dames	Leopardess	Home to a large population of African Leopards, also 1971 to 1997 when the nation was known as Zaire, the coat of arms depicted a leopard head, below it a pair of crossed spears, around it a branch and an elephant tusk.	
Kenya	Harambee Starlets		"Harambee" is Kenya's official motto and is present in its coat of arms. It means "Let's all pull together" in Swahili.	
Nigeria	Super Falcons		From the country's football crest which has the eagle which represents strength	
South Africa	Banyana Banyana	Girls Girls	"Banyana Banyana" is a nickname given to the national women's side by its fans. It is Sotho-Tswana and Nguni and translates literally as "the girls, the girls". Its actual meaning is, "Go girls"	
Tunisia	نسور قرطاج Les Aigles de Carthage	Eagles of Carthage	The Carthaginian Empire extended over much of the coast of Northwest Africa as well as encompassing substantial parts of coastal Iberia and the islands of the western Mediterranean Sea part of which is modern-day Tunisia.	
Uganda	The Crested Cranes		The Golden crested crane is the national bird of Uganda.	
Zambia	Copper Queens		Copper mining is the major economic activity in Zambia.	
Zanzibar	Zanzibar Queens		From the Island name.	
Zimbabwe	Mighty Warriors		From the historic warrior spirit of the indigenous Zimbabwe.	

== See also ==
- List of national association football teams by nickname
