= Armorial of Oceania =

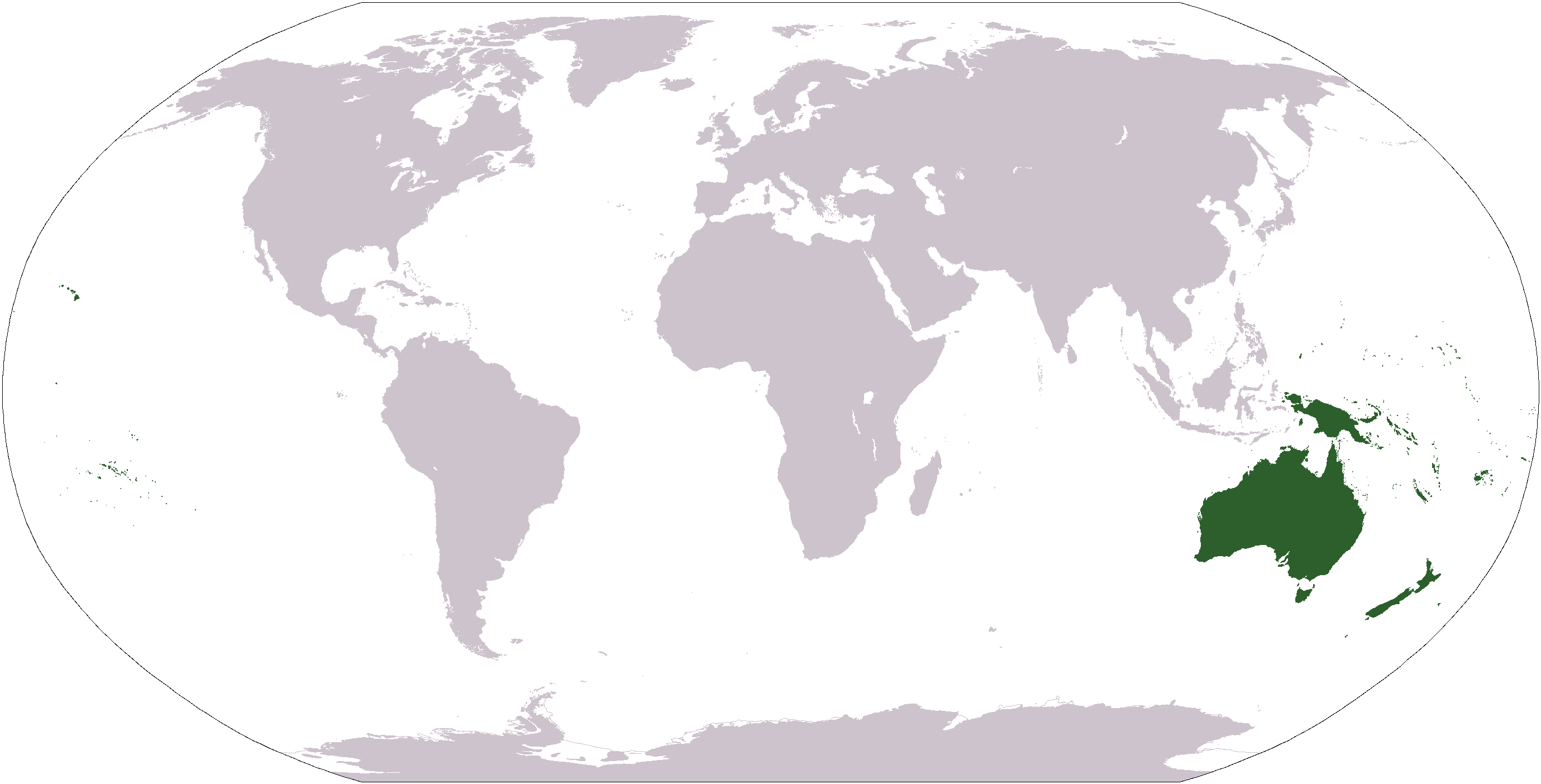

Countries and territories in Oceania have the following emblems and national coats of arms:

== Sovereign states ==
| State | National emblem / Coat of arms | Motto / Text | Main article |
|---|---|---|---|
| Australia | | Australia | Coat of arms of Australia |
| Federated States of Micronesia | | (Outside) Government of the Federated States of Micronesia (Inside) Peace, Unity, Liberty/1979 | Seal of the Federated States of Micronesia |
| Fiji | | Rerevaka na Kalou ka doka na Tui : Fear God and honour the King | Coat of arms of Fiji |
| Indonesia (transcontinental) | | Bhinneka Tunggal Ika : Unity in Diversity | National emblem of Indonesia |
| Kiribati | | Te Mauri Te Raoi Ao Te Tabomoa : Health, Peace and Prosperity | Coat of arms of Kiribati |
| Marshall Islands | | (Top) Republic of the Marshall Islands (Bottom) Jepilpilin Ke Ejukaan : Accomplishment through Joint Effort | Seal of the Marshall Islands |
| Nauru | | (Top) Naoero : Nauru (Bottom) God's Will First | Coat of arms of Nauru |
| New Zealand | | New Zealand | Coat of arms of New Zealand |
| Palau | | (Top) Olbiil era Kelulau : The House of the whispered decisions (Bottom) Republic of Palau | Seal of Palau |
| Papua New Guinea | | none | Emblem of Papua New Guinea |
| Samoa | | Fa'avae i le Atua Samoa : Samoa is founded on God | Coat of arms of Samoa |
| Solomon Islands | | To Lead is to Serve | Coat of arms of the Solomon Islands |
| Tonga | | Ko e ʻOtua mo Tonga ko hoku Tofiʻa : God and Tonga are my inheritance | Coat of arms of Tonga |
| Tuvalu | | Tuvalu mo te Atua : Tuvalu for the Almighty | Coat of arms of Tuvalu |
| Vanuatu | | Long God yumi stanap : We stand with God | Coat of arms of Vanuatu |

== Dependencies and other territories ==
| Dependency / Territory | National emblems / Coat of arms | Motto / Text | Main article |
|---|---|---|---|
| American Samoa | | (Top) Seal of American Samoa • 17 April 1900 (Bottom) Samoa muamua le Atua : Samoa, God is first | Seal of American Samoa |
| Cook Islands | | Cook Islands | Coat of arms of the Cook Islands |
| Easter Island (Rapa Nui) | | none | Coat of arms of Easter Island |
| French Polynesia | | none | Coat of arms of French Polynesia |
| Guam | | Guam | Seal of Guam |
| Hawaii | | (Top) State of Hawaii (Bottom) Ua Mau ke Ea o ka ʻĀina i ka Pono : The life of the land is perpetuated in righteousness | Seal of Hawaii |
| New Caledonia | | none | Emblem of New Caledonia |
| Niue | | Atua, Niue Tukulagi : God, Niue Eternally | Coat of arms of Niue |
| Norfolk Island | | Inasmuch | Coat of arms of Norfolk Island |
| Northern Mariana Islands | | (Outside) Commonwealth of the Northern Marianas (Inside) United States/1976/Official Seal | Seal of the Northern Mariana Islands |
| Pitcairn Islands | | none | Coat of arms of the Pitcairn Islands |
| Tokelau | | Tokelau mo te Atua : Tokelau for God | Badge of Tokelau |
| Wallis and Futuna | | none | Coat of arms of Wallis and Futuna |

== See also ==
- Flags of Oceania
- Armorial of sovereign states
- Armorial of dependent territories
- Armorial of Africa
- Armorial of North America
- Armorial of South America
- Armorial of Asia
- Armorial of Europe
