= Armorial of Asia =

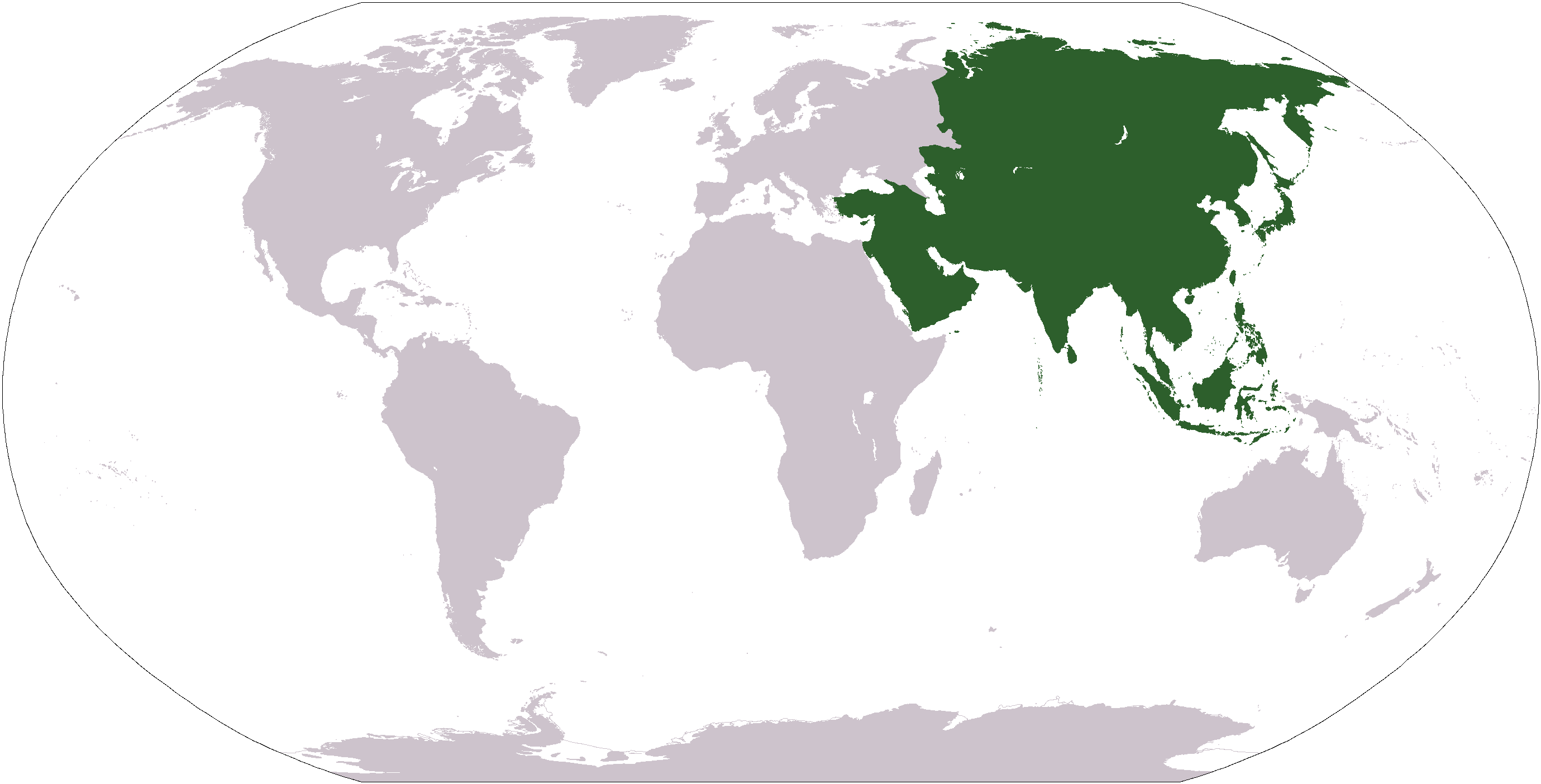

Below is a list of national emblems and coats of arms used by Asian countries, territories and regions.

== Sovereign states ==
State	National emblem / Coat of arms	Motto / Text	Main article
Afghanistan		لا إله إلا الله محمد رسول الله (Arabic: "There is no god but God, Muhammad is the messenger of God")	Emblem of Afghanistan
Armenia		none	Coat of arms of Armenia
Azerbaijan		none	National emblem of Azerbaijan
Bahrain		none	Emblem of Bahrain
Bangladesh		none	Emblem of Bangladesh
Bhutan		none	Emblem of Bhutan
Brunei		(Center) الدائمون المحسنون بالهدى (Arabic: "Always in service with God's guidance") (Bottom) بروني دارالسلام (Arabic: "Brunei, the Abode of Peace")	Emblem of Brunei
Cambodia		ព្រះចៅក្រុងកម្ពុជា (Khmer: "King of the Kingdom of Cambodia")	Royal arms of Cambodia
China		none	National emblem of China
East Timor		República Democrática de Timor-Leste (Portuguese: "Democratic Republic of Timor-Leste") (Top) Unidade, Acção, Progresso (Portuguese: "Unity, Action, Progress") (Center)	Coat of arms of East Timor
Georgia		ძალა ერთობაშია (Georgian: "Strength is in Unity")	Coat of arms of Georgia
India		सत्यमेव जयते (Sanskrit: "Truth Alone Triumphs")	Emblem of India
Indonesia		Bhinneka Tunggal Ika (Old Javanese: "Unity in Diversity")	National emblem of Indonesia
Iran		ﷲ (Arabic: "God", stylized)	Emblem of Iran
Iraq		جمهورية العراق (Arabic: "Republic of Iraq")	Coat of arms of Iraq
Israel		ישראל (Hebrew: "Israel")	Emblem of Israel
Japan		none	Imperial Seal of Japan
Jordan		(Right) الحسين بن طلال بن عبدلله (Arabic: "Abdullah II ibn Al Hussein bin Aoun") (Center) ملك المملكة الأردنية الهاشمية (Arabic: "King of the Hashemite Kingdom of Jordan") (Left) الراجي من الله التوفيق والعون (Arabic: "He who seeks the blessings and guidance of God")	Coat of arms of Jordan
Kazakhstan		Qazaqstan (Kazakh: "Kazakhstan")	Emblem of Kazakhstan
Kuwait		دولة الكويت (Arabic: "State of Kuwait")	Emblem of Kuwait
Kyrgyzstan		Кыргыз Республикасы (Kyrgyz: "Kyrgyz Republic")	Emblem of Kyrgyzstan
Laos		(Right) ເອກະພາບ ວັດຖະນາຖາວອນ (Lao: "Unity and Prosperity") (Center) ສາທາລະນະລັດ ປະຊາທິປະໄຕ ປະຊາຊົນລາວ (Lao: "Lao People's Democratic Republic") (Left) ສັນຕິພາບ, ເອກະລາດ, ປະຊາທິປະໄຕ (Lao: "Peace, Independence, Democracy")	Emblem of Laos
Malaysia		Bersekutu bertambah mutu (Malay: "Unity is Strength")	Coat of arms of Malaysia
Maldives		الدولة المحلديبية (Arabic: "State of the Mahal Dibiyat")	Emblem of Maldives
Mongolia		none	Emblem of Mongolia
Myanmar		ပြည်ထောင်စု သမ္မတ မြန်မာနိုင်ငံတော် (Burmese: "Republic of the Union of Myanmar")	State Seal of Myanmar
Nepal		जननी जन्मभूमिश्च स्वर्गादपि गरीयसी (Sanskrit: "The Mother and the Motherland are greater than Heaven")	Emblem of Nepal
North Korea		조선민주주의인민공화국 (Korean: "Democratic People's Republic of Korea")	Emblem of North Korea
Oman		none	National emblem of Oman
Pakistan		ایمان، اتحاد، نظم (Urdu: "Faith, Unity, Discipline")	State emblem of Pakistan
Palestine		فلسطين (Arabic: "Palestine")	Coat of arms of Palestine
Philippines		Republika ng Pilipinas (Filipino: "Republic of the Philippines")	Coat of arms of the Philippines
Qatar		none	Emblem of Qatar
Republic of Cyprus		1960 (Note: An alternate render of the Coat of Arms of Cyprus based on its blazon has been depicted here, in place of the render officially used by the Republic of Cyprus, in respect of WP:NFCI)	Coat of arms of the Republic of Cyprus
Russia		none	Coat of arms of Russia
Saudi Arabia		none	Emblem of Saudi Arabia
Singapore		Majulah Singapura (Malay: "Onward Singapore")	Coat of arms of Singapore
South Korea		대한민국 (Korean: "Republic of Korea")	Emblem of South Korea
Sri Lanka		none	Emblem of Sri Lanka
Syria		none	Coat of arms of Syria
Tajikistan		none	Emblem of Tajikistan
Thailand		none	Emblem of Thailand
Turkmenistan		none	Emblem of Turkmenistan
United Arab Emirates		الإمارات العربية المتحدة (Arabic: "United Arab Emirates")	Emblem of the United Arab Emirates
Uzbekistan		Oʻzbekiston (Uzbek: "Uzbekistan")	Emblem of Uzbekistan
Vietnam		Cộng hòa Xã hội chủ nghĩa Việt Nam (Vietnamese: "Socialist Republic of Vietnam")	Emblem of Vietnam
Yemen		الجمهورية اليمنية (Arabic: "The Republic of Yemen")	Emblem of Yemen

== States with limited recognition ==
State	National emblem / Coat of Arms	Motto / Text	Main article	Other claimants
Abkhazia		none	Emblem of Abkhazia	Georgia
Northern Cyprus		1983	Coat of arms of Northern Cyprus	Republic of Cyprus
South Ossetia		(Top): Республикӕ Хуссар Ирыстон (Bottom): Республика Южная Осетия (Ossetian (Top) and Russian (Bottom): "Republic of South Ossetia")	Coat of arms of South Ossetia	Georgia
Republic of China (Taiwan)		none	Blue Sky with a White Sun	People's Republic of China (China)

== Dependencies and other territories ==
Country	Dependency / Territory	National emblem / Coat of arms	Motto / Text	Main article
Georgia	Adjara		none	Coat of arms of Adjara
United Kingdom	Akrotiri and Dhekelia		Dieu et mon Droit (French: "God and my right")	Royal coat of arms of the United Kingdom
Philippines	Bangsamoro		(Top) Bangsamoro Autonomous Region in Muslim Mindanao (Bottom) 2019	Seal of Bangsamoro
United Kingdom	British Indian Ocean Territory		In tutela nostra Limuria (Latin: "Limuria is in our charge/trust")	Coat of arms of the British Indian Ocean Territory
People's Republic of China	Hong Kong		中華人民共和國香港特別行政區 (Chinese: "Hong Kong Special Administrative Region of the People's Republic of China")	Emblem of Hong Kong
Iraq	Iraqi Kurdistan		(Inside) 1992 / حكومه تی هەرێمی كوردستان ١٩٩٢ / حكومة اقليم كوردستان (Bottom) : Kurdistan Regional Government	Coat of arms of the Kurdistan Regional Government
People's Republic of China	Macau		中華人民共和國澳門特別行政區 (Chinese: "Macau Special Administrative Region of the People's Republic of China")	Emblem of Macau
Azerbaijan	Nakhichevan		none	Emblem of Azerbaijan

== See also ==
- Flags of Asia
- Armorial of sovereign states
- Armorial of Africa
- Armorial of North America
- Armorial of South America
- Armorial of Europe
- Armorial of Oceania
