= Armorial of South America =

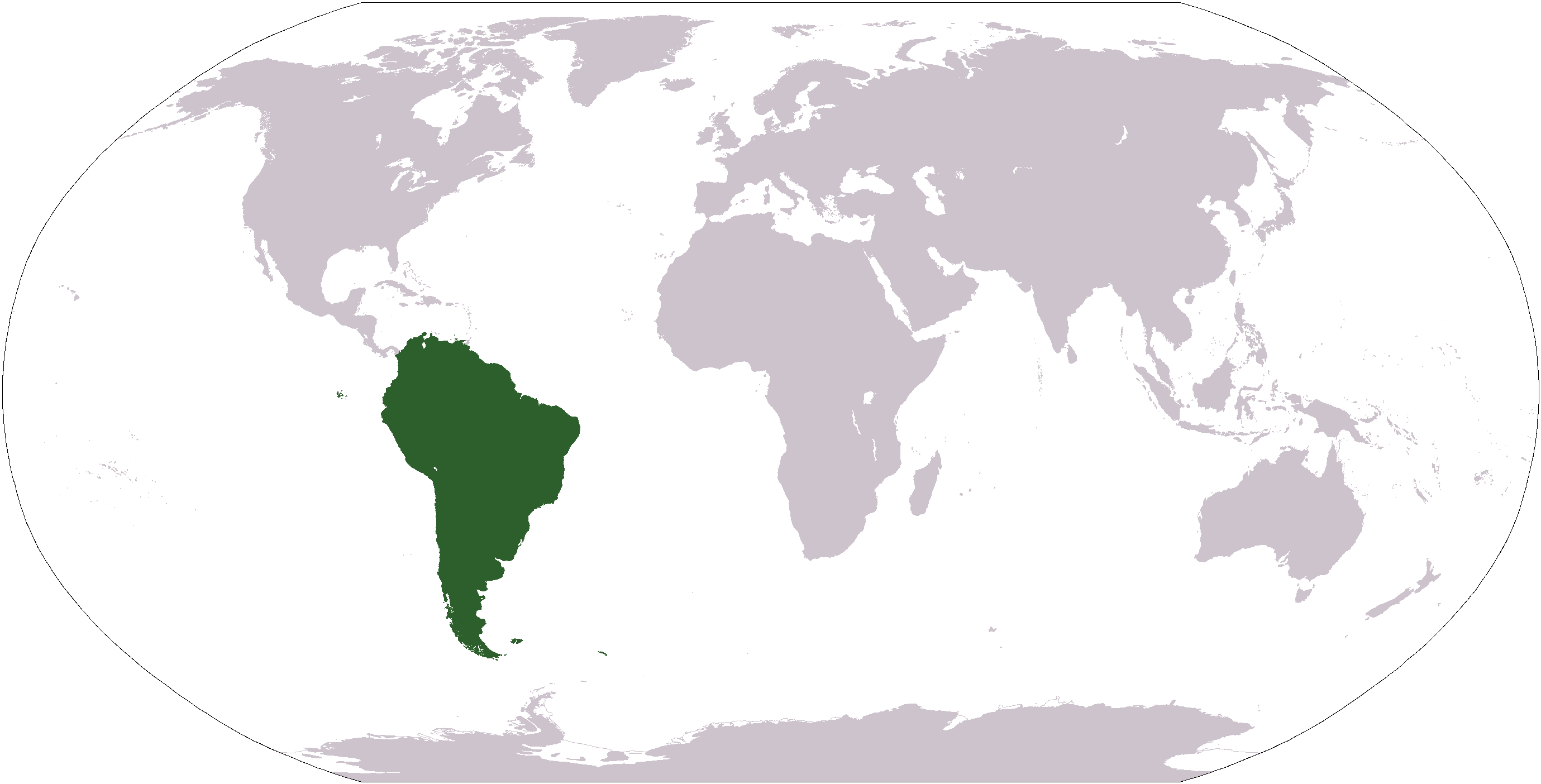

This is a list of the national coats of arms of South American countries.

== Sovereign states ==
State	National emblems / Coat of arms	Motto / Text	Main article
Argentina		none	Coat of arms of Argentina.
Bolivia		Bolivia	Coat of arms of Bolivia.
Brazil		República Federativa do Brasil - 15 de Novembro de 1889; Federative Republic of Brazil - 15 November 1889	Coat of arms of Brazil.
Chile		Por la razón o la fuerza By reason or by force	Coat of arms of Chile.
Colombia		Libertad y Orden; Liberty and Order	Coat of arms of Colombia.
Ecuador		none	Coat of arms of Ecuador.
Guyana		One People, One Nation, One Destiny	Coat of arms of Guyana.
Paraguay		Republica del Paraguay; Republic of the Paraguay	Coat of arms of Paraguay.
Peru		none	Coat of arms of Peru.
Suriname		Justitia, Pietas, Fides; Justice, Piety, Fidelity	Coat of arms of Suriname.
Uruguay		none	Coat of arms of Uruguay.
Venezuela		19 de Abril de 1810 - Independencia; 20 de Febrero de 1859 - Federación; República Bolivariana de Venezuela; April 19, 1810 - Independence; February 20, 1859 - Federation; Bolivarian Republic of Venezuela	Coat of arms of Venezuela.

== Dependencies and other territories ==
Dependency / Territory	National emblems / Coat of arms	Motto / Text	Main article
Aruba		none	Coat of arms of Aruba.
Bonaire		none	Coat of arms of Bonaire
Curaçao		none	Coat of arms of Curaçao.
Falkland Islands		Desire the Right	Coat of arms of the Falkland Islands.
French Guiana		Fert Aurum Industria - 1643; Work Creates Abundance - 1643	Coat of arms of French Guiana.
Juan Fernández Islands		none	Coat of arms of the Juan Fernández Islands.
South Georgia and the South Sandwich Islands		Leo Terram Propriam Protegat; Let the lion protect its own land	Coat of arms of South Georgia and the South Sandwich Islands.

== See also ==
- Flags of South America
- Armorial of sovereign states
- Armorial of Africa
- Armorial of North America
- Armorial of Asia
- Armorial of Europe
- Armorial of Oceania
