= Arms of state =

Arms of state may mean

- The national coat of arms of a state
- The branches of government, see separation of powers
