= Armorial of Europe =

List of national coats of arms of European countries

This is a list of the national coats of arms or equivalent emblems used by countries and dependent territories in Europe.

== Sovereign states ==
Country		Coat of arms or emblem	Blazon	Motto/Text	Article
Albania			Gules, a two-headed eagle Sable; in chief the helmet of Skanderbeg or.	None	Coat of arms of Albania
Andorra			Quarterly: I Gules, a bishop's mitre or lined Argent (for La Seu d'Urgell); II Or, three pales Gules (for Foix); III or, four pallets Gules (for the Crown of Aragon); IV or, two cows passant per pale Gules (for Béarn).	Virtus unita fortior (Latin); United virtue is stronger	Coat of arms of Andorra
Armenia			Four symbols of Armenian dynasties (Artashesian, Arshakunian, Bagratuni, and Rubinian); In the center of a shield is a depiction of Mount Ararat with Noah's Ark sitting atop it.	None	Coat of arms of Armenia
Austria			Gules a fess Argent, escutcheon on the breast of an eagle displayed Sable, langued Gules, beaked or, crowned with a mural crown of three visible merlons or, armed or, dexter talon holding sickle, sinister talon holding hammer, both talons shackled with chain broken Argent.	None	Coat of arms of Austria
Azerbaijan			Fire with stalk of wheat and oak on escutcheon.	None	National emblem of Azerbaijan
Belarus			Globe, rising sun and an outline of Belarus in Or.	Рэспубліка Беларусь (Belarusian, Respublika Bielaruś) Republic of Belarus	National emblem of Belarus
Belgium			Sable, a lion rampant or, armed and langued gules.	L'union fait la force (French) | Eendracht maakt macht (Dutch) (lit. 'Unity makes strength')	Coat of arms of Belgium
Bosnia and Herzegovina			Per bend enhanced or and azure, a bend of mullets palewise argent.	None	Coat of arms of Bosnia and Herzegovina
Bulgaria			Gules, a crowned lion rampant or.	Съединението прави силата (Bulgarian, Saedinenieto pravi silata); Unity makes strength	Coat of arms of Bulgaria
Croatia			Chequy gules and argent. With crown made of five lesser shields with historical Croatian coats of arms, lined from left to right in the following order: the oldest known Croatian coat of arms (shield on a light blue field a yellow (golden) six-pointed star with a white (silver) crescent), coats of arms of the Dubrovnik Republic (shield on a blue field two red bars), Dalmatia (shield on a light blue field three golden crowned lion heads), Istria (a shield on a blue field a golden with red hooves and horns) and Slavonia (on a light blue field two horizontal white (silver) bars, between bars a red field, on which sneaks a marten with a golden six-pointed star). The coat of arms is lined red.	None	Coat of arms of Croatia
Czech Republic			Quarterly: 1 and 4 Gules, a lion rampant queue fourché in saltire argent armed, langued and crowned or (for Bohemia); 2 Azure, an eagle Chequy gules and argent armed, beaked, langued and crowned or (for Moravia); 3 or, an eagle Sable charged with a crescent trefly Argent ending in crosses armed, beaked and langued gules crowned or (for Silesia).	None (Note: The Czech national motto, Pravda vítězí ("Truth prevails"), does not appear on the arms, but rather on the Presidential Standard)	Coat of arms of the Czech Republic
Cyprus			Or (specified to be copper-yellow), a dove rising proper, in its beak argent an olive branch proper vert.	1960. Year of declaration of independence. (Note: An alternate render of the Coat of Arms of Cyprus based on its blazon has been depicted here, in place of the render officially used by the Republic of Cyprus, in respect of WP:NFCI)	Coat of arms of Cyprus
Denmark			Or, three lions passant in pale Azure crowned and armed or langued Gules, nine hearts Gules.	None. Each monarch chooses a personal motto.	Coat of arms of Denmark
Estonia			Or, three lions passant guardant azure.	None	Coat of arms of Estonia
Finland			Gules, a crowned lion rampant or striking a sword Argent on armoured dexter arm, trampling on a sabre Argent; surmounted by nine roses Argent.	None	Coat of arms of Finland
Georgia			Gules, with an image of Saint George, riding a horse trampling upon a crawling dragon, whose head is pierced by the saint's spear, all of them Argent.	ძალა ერთობაშია (Georgian, dzala ertobashia); Strength is in unity	Coat of arms of Georgia
Germany			Or, an eagle sable, armed, beaked and langued gules.	None	Coat of arms of Germany
Greece			Azure, a Cross Argent.	None	National emblem of Greece
Hungary			Per pale: 1 barry of eight Gules and Argent; 2 Gules, on a mount Vert a crown or, issuant therefrom a double cross Argent.	None	Coat of arms of Hungary
Iceland			Azure, a cross gules fimbriated argent.	None	Coat of arms of Iceland
Ireland			Azure, a harp or stringed argent.	None	Coat of arms of Ireland
Italy			The Stella d’Italia, which is the oldest national symbol of Italy, since it dates back to ancient Greece, supported by branches of olive and oak. The cogwheel surrounding the star refers to Article 1 of the Constitution of the Italian Republic, which states: "Italy is a democratic republic, built on labour."	REPVBBLICA ITALIANA (Italian) Italian Republic	Emblem of Italy
Kazakhstan			A Sky-blue yurt with a yellow pentagonal star in the top, Shanyrak in the centre-half, two tulpars in the right and left, and motto of Kazakhstan in the bottom.	QAZAQSTAN	Emblem of Kazakhstan
Latvia			At left: A red lion rampant sinister against a silver background (for Kurzeme and Zemgale); At right: A silver griffon rampant with a silver sword in its right paw against a red background (for Vidzeme and Latgale); At top: A golden rising sun against a blue background.	None	Coat of arms of Latvia
Liechtenstein			Quarterly: 1 or, an Eagle displayed Sable crowned and armed or, charged with a crescent trefly Argent ending in crosses (for Silesia); 2 Barry of eight or and Sable charged with crancelin Vert (for the Kuenring family of Saxony); 3 Per pale Gules and Argent (for the Duchy of Troppau); (4) or, a maiden eagle displayed Sable the human part Argent crowned and armed or (for the Cirksena family of East Frisia). In base: Azure, a Hunting Horn stringed or (for the Duchy of Jägerndorf). An Escutcheon per fess or and Gules.	None	Coat of arms of Liechtenstein
Lithuania			Gules, an armoured knight armed cap-à-pie mounted on a horse salient holding in his dexter hand a sword Argent above his head. A shield Azure hangs on the sinister shoulder charged with a double cross (Cross of Jagiellonian dynasty) or. The horse saddles, straps, and belts Azure. The hilt of the sword, and the fastening of the sheath, the stirrups, the curb bits of the bridle, the horseshoes, as well as the decoration of the harness, all or.	None	Coat of arms of Lithuania
Luxembourg			Barry of ten Argent and Azure, a lion rampant queue fourché in Saltire (with tail forked and crossed) Gules crowned, armed and langued or.	None	Coat of arms of Luxembourg
North Macedonia			Two curved garlands of sheaves of wheat, tobacco leaves and opium poppy fruits, tied by a ribbon decorated with embroidery of traditional Macedonian folk motifs. In the centre a mountain, a lake and a sunrise.	None	National emblem of North Macedonia
Malta			Per pale Argent and Gules, a representation of George Cross Argent fimbriated Gules in Dexter Chief.	Repubblika ta' Malta (Maltese); Republic of Malta	Coat of arms of Malta
Moldova			Party per fess, Gules and Azure; an aurochs, an eight-pointed star, a rose, and a crescent moon, all or.	None	Coat of arms of Moldova
Monaco			Fusily (lozengy) argent and gules.	Deo Juvante (Latin); With God's help	Coat of arms of Monaco
Montenegro			Azure, a base Vert, a lion passant or armed and langued Gules; a bordure or.	None	Coat of arms of Montenegro
Netherlands			Azure, billetty or, a lion with a coronet or armed and langued Gules holding in his dexter paw a sword Argent hilted or and in the sinister paw seven arrows Argent pointed and bound together or.	Je Maintiendrai (French); I will maintain	Coat of arms of the Netherlands
Norway			Gules, a lion rampant or, crowned and bearing an axe with blade argent.	None	Coat of arms of Norway
Poland			Gules, an eagle argent armed, crowned and beaked or, langued argent.	None	Coat of arms of Poland
Portugal			Argent, five Escutcheons Azure, each charged with five Bezants or, crosswise; a bordure Gules charged with seven Castles or, all surmounting an armillary sphere or.	None	Coat of arms of Portugal
Romania			Quarterly: 1 Azure, an Eagle displayed or, beaked and taloned Gules, holding in its beak an Orthodox cross or, between in dexter chief a Sun in splendour and in sinister chief an Increscent, both or (for Wallachia); 2 a Bull's head caboshed Sable, between in dexter base a Rose and in sinister base a decrescent, both Argent, between the Bull's horns, a Mullet of five points or (for Moldavia); 3 Gules, issuant from water in base proper, a Lion rampant or, holding in its dexter paw a Sabre Argent, hilted or, behind a Bridge of two arches embattled or, masoned Sable (for Banat and Oltenia); 4 Per fess Azure, a Demi-Eagle Sable between in dexter chief a Sun in splendour or and in sinister chief a Decrescent Argent; and or, seven Castles Gules, a Barrulet Gules (for Transylvania); Entree en point, two Dolphins urinant respectant or (for Dobruja).	None	Coat of arms of Romania
Russia			Gules, a two-headed eagle each head imperially crowned holding in its dexter talon a sceptre and in its sinister talon a globus cruciger and ensigned with an imperial crown all or. An Inescutcheon Gules, a representation of Saint George upon horseback argent slaying a dragon or.	None	Coat of arms of Russia
San Marino			Azure on three mountain tops vert three towers argent masoned and windowed sable each weather vaned with an ostrich plume argent.	Libertas (Latin); Liberty	Coat of arms of San Marino
Serbia			Gules, a two-headed eagle Argent armed or, two fleurs-de-lys or. Overall an escutcheon Gules, a St. George's cross Argent between four firesteels Argent (Serbian cross).	None	Coat of arms of Serbia
Slovakia			Gules, on a mount Azure, issuant therefrom a double cross Argent.	None	Coat of arms of Slovakia
Slovenia			Azure, a mountain of three peaks Argent, base barry wavy Argent Azure, in center chief three mullets of 6 Or lower, bordure Gules.	None	Coat of arms of Slovenia
Spain			Quarterly: 1 Gules, a three towered castle or, masoned sable and ajouré azure (for Castile); 2 Argent, a lion rampant purpure (for León); 3 or, four pallets gules (for Aragon); 4 Gules, a cross, saltire and orle of chains linked together or, a centre point vert (for Navarre); En point: Argent, a pomegranate proper seeded gules, supported, sculpted and leafed in two leaves vert (for Granada); Inescutcheon: Azure bordure gules, three fleur-de-lis or (for the House of Bourbon-Anjou).	Plus Ultra (Latin); Further Beyond	Coat of arms of Spain
Sweden			Quarterly: 1 and 4 Azure, three coronets or, placed two above one (the Three Crowns); 2 and 3 Three sinisterbendwise streams argent, a lion crowned with an open crown or armed gules (for the House of Bjälbo). Inescutcheon party per pale Bendwise azure, argent and gules, a vasa or (for the House of Vasa); and Azure, issuant from a wavy base a bridge with three arches and two towers embattled argent, in honor point an eagle regardant with wings inverted resting on thunderbolts or, and in chief the Big Dipper constellation of the same (for the House of Bernadotte).	None	Coat of arms of Sweden
Switzerland			Gules, a Cross couped Argent.	None	Coat of arms of Switzerland
Ukraine			Azure, a Tryzub (trident) or.	None	Coat of arms of Ukraine
United Kingdom	As used in England, Northern Ireland, Wales, and externally		Quarterly: 1 and 4 Gules, three lions passant guardant in pale or armed and langued azure (for England); 2 or a lion rampant Gules armed and langued Azure within a double tressure flory-counter-flory of the second (for Scotland); 3 Azure, a harp or stringed argent (for Ireland).	Dieu et mon droit (French); God and my right Honi soit qui mal y pense (Old French); Shamed be he who thinks ill of it	Royal coat of arms of the United Kingdom
United Kingdom	As used in Scotland		Quarterly: 1 and 4 or a lion rampant Gules armed and langued Azure within a double tressure flory-counter-flory of the second (for Scotland); 2 Gules, three lions passant guardant in pale or armed and langued azure (for England); 3 Azure, a harp or stringed argent (for Ireland).	In Defens (Scots); Abbreviation of In my defens God me defend Nemo me impune lacessit (Latin); No one attacks me with impunity	Royal coat of arms of the United Kingdom
Vatican City			Gules, two keys in saltire or and argent, interlaced in the rings gules, beneath a tiara argent, crowned or.	None	Coat of arms of the State of Vatican City

== Other sovereign entities ==
Entity	Coat of arms or emblem	Description	Text	Main article
Sovereign Military Order of Malta		Gules, a cross argent	None	Coat of arms of the Sovereign Military Order of Malta

== Disputed and/or unrecognised countries ==
Country	Coat of arms or emblem	Text	Main article
Abkhazia		None	Emblem of Abkhazia
Kosovo		None	Coat of arms of Kosovo
Northern Cyprus		1983	Coat of arms of the Turkish Republic of Northern Cyprus
South Ossetia		Ossetian: Республикӕ Хуссар Ирыстон. Russian: Республика Южная Осетия. Translated in English: "Republic of South Ossetia"	Emblem of South Ossetia
Transnistria		Romanian: Република Молдовеняскэ Нистрянэ (in Moldovan Cyrillic); Russian: Приднестровская Молдавская Республика; Ukrainian: Придністровська Молдавська Республіка	Emblem of Transnistria

== Dependent territories ==
Dependency	Coat of arms or emblem	Blazon	Text	Main article
Åland (Finland)		Azure a stag trippant Or.	None	Coat of arms of Åland
Azores (Portugal)		Argent, a goshawk displayed azure, beaked, langued, taloned and armed gules, a bordure gules, charged with nine mullets of five points Or.	Antes morrer livres que em paz sujeitos ("Rather die free than subjected in peace")	Coat of arms of the Azores
Faroe Islands (Denmark)		Azure, a ram argent, langued gules, armed and unguled Or.	None	Coat of arms of the Faroe Islands
Gibraltar (UK)		Argent, upon a base gules a castle triple-towered of the same ported and windowed sable with a cord issuant from the portal, pendent therefrom a key Or.	Insignia Montis Calpe (Badge of the Rock of Gibraltar)	Coat of arms of Gibraltar
Guernsey (UK)		Gules, 3 lions passant guardant Or, langued and armed Azure.	None	Coat of arms of Guernsey
Isle of Man (UK)		Gules three legs in armour flexed at the knee and conjoined at the thigh, all proper, garnished and spurred or.	Quocunque jeceris stabit (Latin); Whichever way you throw, it will stand	Coat of arms of the Isle of Man
Jersey (UK)		Gules three lions passant guardant in pale Or armed and langued Azure.	None	Coat of arms of Jersey
Madeira (Portugal)		Azure a pale Or charged with the Cross of Christ.	Das Ilhas as Mais Belas e Livres (Of all islands, the most beautiful and free)	Coat of arms of Madeira

== See also ==
- Flags of Europe
- Armorial of sovereign states
- Armorial of Africa
- Armorial of North America
- Armorial of South America
- Armorial of Asia
- Armorial of Oceania
