= Arms of dominion =

Royal arms borne both by a monarch and a state

Arms of dominion are the arms borne both by a monarch and the state in a monarchy.

In this respect they are both the national arms and the arms of the nation's monarch, who is the monarchy's sovereign, and are thus simultaneously the personal arms of the monarch and the arms of the state over which the monarch reigns.

== Background ==
The heraldic author John Brooke-Little, Norroy and Ulster King of Arms, in his book 'An Heraldic Alphabet' (page 38) wrote regarding arms of dominion:

"These, which are also styled 'arms of sovereignty', are those borne by a sovereign in respect of the territories he rules rather than his own family arms. The royal arms are arms of dominion; the Queen's arms of descent would be those of her own branch of the House of Saxony. Arms of dominion do not follow the ordinary rules and conventions of armory but are settled ad hoc by the monarch, usually, of course, with ministerial and heraldic advice."

Furthermore, in his 1983 revision to 'Boutell's Heraldry', Brooke-Little stated (page 222):

Royal Arms, or Arms of Dominion, are inseparable from the office and rank of royalty, and cannot be borne undifferenced by any person except the Sovereign... The Royal Arms may not be quartered without some difference. In the person of Sovereigns, all minor ranks and titles are merged in their royalty; consequently whatever arms they may previously have borne cease to be used at their accession, and no other arms may be quartered with the Royal Arms. The arms of the Sovereign are not impaled with those of his or her consort.

Therefore, in most hereditary monarchies the arms of dominion are also the arms of state; they cannot be used by anyone else; no matter how closely related they are to the monarch. Thus younger members of royal houses will use arms that are similar to those of the monarch, but they are made slightly different by marks that are placed on the shield, including but not restricted to, labels. This is called cadency, and is equally applicable to the arms of non-royal families, but is not as enforced. Within royal families, however, it is rigidly enforced by the heraldic authorities of the particular country.

In republics, the arms of the head of state (who is not the sovereign by definition) are not the same as the arms of the state (which is sovereign – or rather – the people of the state are sovereign). For example, the coat of arms of the United States and the arms of the various presidents are not the same. This is something that has been well established since pre-modern times; the arms of the various doges of the republics of Venice and Genoa were not the same as the republics over which they ruled.

Common external elements in arms of dominion are royal pavilions, which are used in most arms of dominion, modern and historical, except in the arms of countries that belong to the Commonwealth of Nations.

== Arms of dominion currently in use ==
Arms of dominion of the Co-Princes of Andorra, Josep-Lluís Serrano Pentinat and Emmanuel Macron

Arms of dominion of the King of Bahrain, Hamad bin Isa Al Khalifa

Arms of dominion of the King of Cambodia, Norodom Sihamoni

Arms of dominion of the King of Canada, Charles III

Arms of dominion of the King of Denmark, Frederik X

Arms of dominion of the King of Eswatini, Mswati III

Arms of dominion of the King of Jordan, Abdullah II of Jordan

Emblem of Kuwait used by the Emir of Kuwait, Mishal Al-Ahmad Al-Jaber Al-Sabah

Arms of dominion of the King of Lesotho, Letsie III

Arms of dominion of the Prince of Liechtenstein, Hans-Adam II

Arms of dominion of the Prince of Monaco, Albert II

Arms of dominion of the King of Morocco, Mohammed VI

Arms of dominion of the King of the Netherlands, Willem-Alexander

Arms of dominion of the King of Norway, Haakon VIII

Emblem of Saudi Arabia used by the King of Saudi Arabia, Salman bin Abdulaziz Al Saud

Arms of dominion of the King of Sweden, Carl XVI Gustaf

Arms of dominion of the King of Tonga, Tupou VI

Arms of dominion for the King of the United Kingdom, Charles III (for use outside Scotland)

Arms of dominion for the King of the United Kingdom, Charles III (for use in Scotland)

== Arms of dominion used in former monarchies ==
Arms of dominion of Franz Joseph I, Emperor of Austria and King of Hungary

Arms of dominion of Faustin I, Emperor of Haiti

Arms of dominion of the Kings of the Serbs, Croats and Slovenes/Yugoslavia, 1919–1945

Arms of dominion of the Emperors of Russia, 1857–1917

Arms of dominion of the Kings of Serbia, 1882–1918

Arms of dominion of the Kings of the Bulgarians (there are variants) until 1946

Arms of dominion of King Victor Emmanuel III of the Albanians, 1939–1945

Arms of the Kings of Italy until 1946

Arms of dominion of the Kings of Romania from 1881 to 1922

Arms of dominion of the Kings of Romania, 1922–1947

Arms of dominion of the Kings of Greece (there are variants) from 1863 to 1922 and 1935 to 1974

Arms of dominion of the Kings of France and Navarre (there are variants) to 1792, 1814, and 1815–1830

Arms of dominion of the Emperors of the French, 1804–1814, 1815 and (with modifications), 1852–1870

Arms of dominion of the Shahs of Pahlavi Iran, 1932–1979

Arms of dominion of Agustin I, Emperor of Mexico, 1822–1823

Arms of dominion of Maximillian I, Emperor of Mexico, 1863–1867

Arms of dominion of the Kings of Nepal, 1962–2008

Arms of dominion of the Kings of Portugal, c. 1830–1910

Arms of dominion of the Emperors of Brazil, 1822–1889

Arms of dominion of Bokassa I, Emperor of the Central African Empire

Arms of dominion of the Kings of Yemen until 1962

Arms of dominion of Idris I, King of Libya, 1951–1969

Arms of dominion of the Kings of Egypt, 1922–1953

Arms of dominion of the Kings of Iraq, 1921–1958
