= Armorial of North America =

Coats of arms of countries

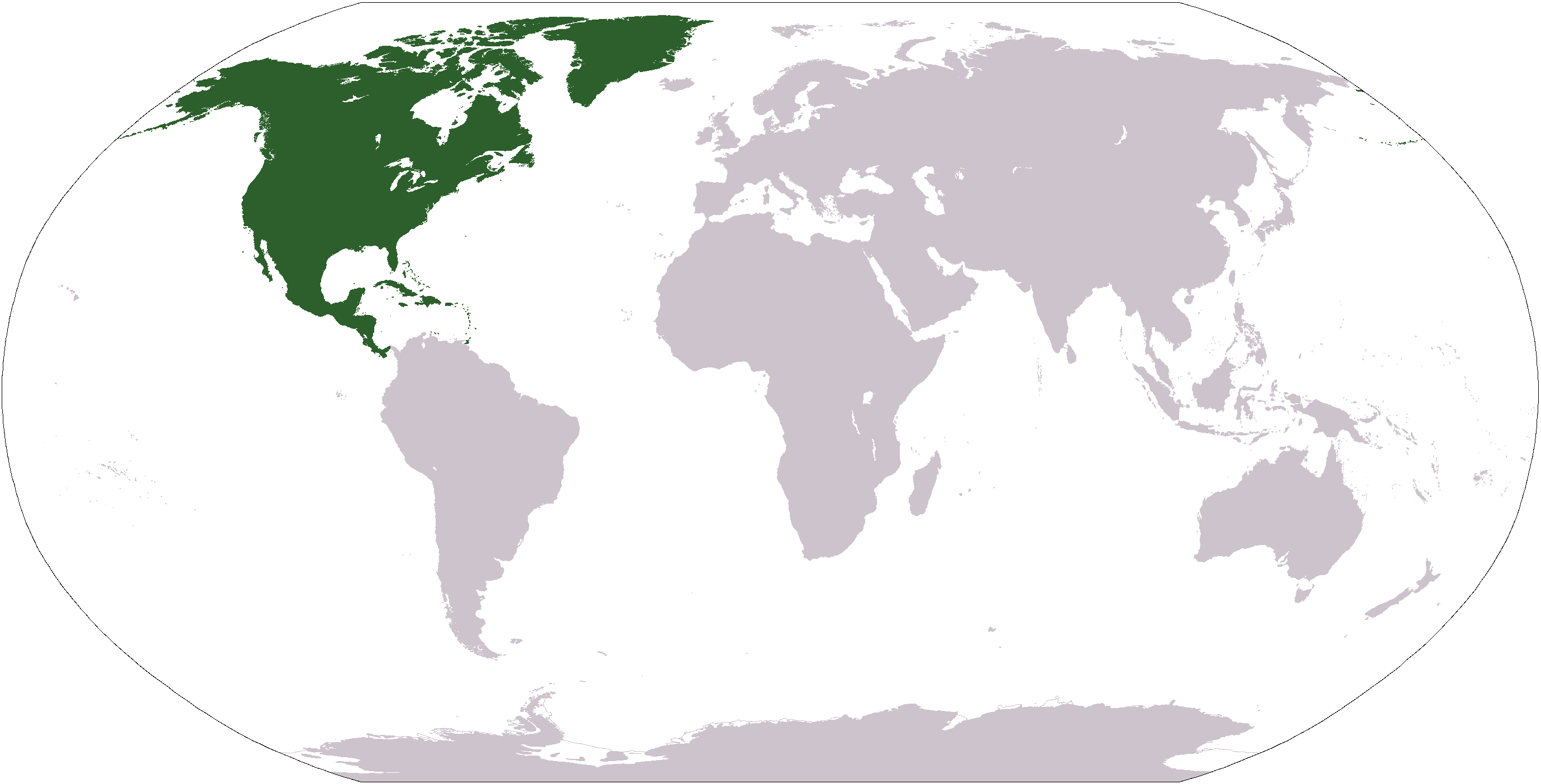

This is a list of the coats of arms of North American countries.

== Sovereign states ==
State	National emblems / Coat of arms	Motto / Text	Main article
Antigua and Barbuda		Each endeavouring, all achieving	Coat of arms of Antigua and Barbuda
Bahamas		Forward, Upward, Onward Together	Coat of arms of the Bahamas
Barbados		Pride and Industry	Coat of arms of Barbados
Belize		Sub Umbra Floreo (Under the shade I flourish)	Coat of arms of Belize
Canada		(Inside) Desiderantes Meliorem Patriam (They desire a better country) (Outside) A Mari Usque Ad Mare (From sea to sea)	Arms of Canada
Costa Rica		America Central (Central America); Republica de Costa Rica (Republic of Costa Rica)	Coat of arms of Costa Rica
Cuba		none	Coat of arms of Cuba
Dominica		Après Bondie C'est La Ter (After God, it is the Earth)	Coat of arms of Dominica
Dominican Republic		(Top) Dios, Patria, Libertad (God, Homeland, Liberty) (Bottom) República Dominicana (Dominican Republic)	Coat of arms of the Dominican Republic
El Salvador		(Outside) República de El Salvador en la América Central (Republic of El Salvador in Central America) (Inside) Dios, Unión, Libertad (God, Union, Liberty)	Coat of arms of El Salvador
Grenada		Ever conscious of God we aspire, build and advance as one people	Coat of arms of Grenada
Guatemala		Libertad 15 de Septiembre de 1821 (Freedom September 15, 1821)	Coat of arms of Guatemala
Haiti		L'Union Fait La Force (Unity makes strength)	Coat of arms of Haiti
Honduras		Republica de Honduras, Libre, Soberana e Independiente 15 de Septiembre de 1821 (Republic of Honduras, Free, Sovereign and Independent 15 September, 1821)	Coat of arms of Honduras
Jamaica		Out of many, one people	Coat of arms of Jamaica
Mexico		none	Coat of arms of Mexico
Nicaragua		Republica de Nicaragua, America Central (Republic of Nicaragua, Central America)	Coat of arms of Nicaragua
Panama		Pro mundi beneficio (For the benefit of the World)	Coat of arms of Panama
Saint Kitts and Nevis		Country above self	Coat of arms of Saint Kitts and Nevis
Saint Lucia		The Land, the People, the Light	Coat of arms of Saint Lucia
Saint Vincent and the Grenadines		Pax et Justitia (Peace and Justice)	Coat of arms of Saint Vincent and the Grenadines
Trinidad and Tobago		Together we aspire, Together we achieve	Coat of arms of Trinidad and Tobago
United States		E Pluribus Unum (Out of many, one)	Great Seal of the United States

== Dependencies and other territories ==
Dependency / Territory	National emblem / Coat of arms	Motto / Text	Main article
Anguilla		none	Coat of arms of Anguilla
Aruba		none	Coat of arms of Aruba
Bermuda		Quo Fata Ferunt (Whither the Fates Carry [Us])	Coat of arms of Bermuda
Bonaire		none	Coat of arms of Bonaire
British Virgin Islands		Vigilate (Be Vigilant)	Coat of arms of the British Virgin Islands
Cayman Islands		He hath founded it upon the seas	Coat of arms of the Cayman Islands
Curaçao		none	Coat of arms of Curaçao
Greenland		none	Coat of arms of Greenland
Guadeloupe		none	Coat of arms of Guadeloupe
Martinique		none	Coat of arms of Martinique
Montserrat		none	Coat of arms of Montserrat
Puerto Rico		Joannes Est Nomen Ejus (John is his name)	Coat of arms of Puerto Rico
Saint Barthélemy		Ouanalao : [Indigenous name of the island]	Coat of arms of Saint Barthélemy
Saint Martin		Saint Martin	Emblem of Saint Martin
Saint Pierre and Miquelon		A mare labor (Work from the Sea)	Coat of arms of Saint Pierre and Miquelon
Saba		Remis velisque / Saba (With oars and sails / Saba_	Coat of arms of Saba (island)
Sint Eustatius		Superba et confidens (Proud and confident)	Coat of arms of Sint Eustatius
Sint Maarten		Semper pro grediens (Always progressing)	Coat of arms of Sint Maarten
Turks and Caicos Islands		none	Coat of arms of the Turks and Caicos Islands
United States Virgin Islands		(Outside) Government of the United States Virgin Islands (Inside) United in pride and hope	Seal of the United States Virgin Islands

== See also ==
- Flags of North America
- Armorial of sovereign states
- Armorial of Africa
- Armorial of South America
- Armorial of Asia
- Armorial of Europe
- Armorial of Oceania
