= Coat of arms of Uganda =

Versions
- Badge of the Uganda Protectorate (1914–1962)
- Armiger: Republic of Uganda
- Adopted: 9 October 1962
- Shield: Sable, upon the fess point a sun in splendour and in base a Uganda drum Or, the skin and guy ropes Argent, a chief barry wavy of six Azure and Argent. Behind the shield two Uganda spears of estate in saltire proper.
- Supporters: Dexter an Ugandan kob; sinister, a crested crane, both proper.
- Compartment: A grassy mount down the centre of which flows a river, between dexter a sprig of coffee and in sinister a sprig of cotton, both leaved and fructed proper.
- Motto: For God and My Country

The coat of arms of Uganda was adopted three weeks before the proclamation of independence by the Uganda Legislative Council. On 1 October 1962 the arms were approved by Governor of Uganda Walter Coutts, and formally established by law on 9 October.

The shield and spears represent the willingness of the Ugandan people to defend their country. There are three images on the shield: those on top represent the waves of Lake Victoria and Lake Albert; the sun in the centre represents the many days of brilliant sunshine Uganda enjoys; and the traditional drum at the bottom is symbolic of dancing, and the summoning of people to meetings and ceremony.

The above explanation, about the symbolism of the drum, is a distortion that came about after the bloody 1966 national crisis when the Prime Minister of the day, Milton Obote, made a violent military attack on the king of the Kingdom of Buganda in central Uganda, Edward Mutesa II, who was the ceremonial president of the state at the time. The following year, 1967, the nation's constitution was abrogated and replaced with a new one which abolished the country's ancient monarchies—the kingdoms of Buganda, Bunyoro, Ankole, Toro, and the Principality of Busoga, turning Uganda into a republic and making Milton Obote president with unlimited executive powers.

Before Obote's rule, the drum was symbolic of royalty and the authority of Uganda's kings. On a related note, the kings of Uganda were the first to use the traditional lentil shaped African shield in their heraldic arms.

The shield is flanked on the heraldic left side by a crested crane (Balearica regulorum gibbericeps), a subspecies of the grey-crowned crane and the national bird of Uganda. On the right is the Ugandan kob (Kobus kob thomasi), a subspecies of kob that here represents abundant wildlife.

The shield stands on a green mound, representing fertile land, and directly above a representation of the River Nile. Two main cash crops, coffee and cotton, flank the river. At the bottom is the national motto: "For God and My Country".

== Blazon ==
For arms, sable upon the fess point a sun in his splendour and in base a Uganda drum gold the skin and guy-ropes argent, a chief barry wavy of six azure and argent; behind the shield two Uganda spears of estate crossed in saltire proper; and upon a compartment representing a grassy mound down the centre of which flows a river between in dexter a sprig of coffee and in sinister a sprig of cotton, both leaved and fructed proper, for supporters, on the dexter side a male Uganda kob proper and on the sinister side a crested crane likewise proper; together with this motto, FOR GOD AND MY COUNTRY.

== See also ==
- Armorial of Africa
