= Coat of arms of Suriname =

Versions
- Version used from 1959 to 1975

- Version used from colonial period
- Armiger: Republic of Suriname
- Adopted: 25 November 1975
- Shield: Trade ship on water, palm tree on land, single diamond, single star
- Supporters: Two Arawak Natives armed with bows and quivers, dressed in loincloth and ceremonial headdress.
- Compartment: Red ribbon or banner
- Motto: Justitia, Pietas, Fides "Justice, Piety, Fidelity"

The coat of arms of Suriname was adopted on November 25, 1975. It consists of two indigenous men carrying an oval shield, below which rests a pennant bearing the motto "justitia, pietas, fides". The shield features a sailing ship at sea on the left half and a royal palm on the earth on the right. In the center is a green diamond containing a yellow five-pointed star.

== Description ==
The sailboat represents Suriname's colonial past as a source of cash crops and its present day involvement in international commerce; the royal palm represents both the rainforest that covers two-thirds of the country and the country's involvement in agribusiness; the diamond represents the mining industry; the star symbolizes the five continents from which the inhabitants of Suriname immigrated. The motto is Latin and means "justice, piety, trust". The shield bearers symbolize the indigenous people as the original inhabitants of the region.

== History ==
In 1770, the coat of arms belonged to the City of Amsterdam. However, in 1975, the year of Suriname's independence, Suriname introduced a new coat of arms to acknowledge and respect the indigenous population as well as to represent the new country.

It consists of two Arawak Indians who represent the unity of the Indigenous people. The bright yellow star in the center symbolizes the people that migrated to Suriname including America, Asia, Africa, Australia, and Europe. The green diamond shape in the middle represents a hart.

The oval shape shield that is divided into two portrays a boat on the left side and rain forest on the right. The boat on the left side represent the history of slavery in Suriname and the people that were shipped from Africa. The right side of the shield, symbolizes justice. At the bottom shield there is a banner stating 'JUSTITIA PIETAS FIDES'. Justitia means 'justified', Pietas means faithfulness towards God, family and country, and lastly, Fides means loyalty to commitment.

In 1682 the coat of Suriname still belonged to the Dutch West India Company, until Suriname established the 'Society of Suriname' in 1683.
