= Coat of arms of Vanuatu =

- Armiger: Republic of Vanuatu
- Adopted: 1980
- Shield: A Melanesian warrior, armed with a spear, standing before a mountain; behind him a boar's tusk and two leaves of the namele (coconut palm) in saltire, all proper and the golden scroll on the bottom with the National Motto.
- Motto: Long God yumi stanap "With God we stand"

The coat of arms of Vanuatu features a Melanesian warrior holding a spear standing before a mountain (Mount Tabwemasana, the country's highest peak) superimposed on a boar's tusk encircling two crossed namele fern fronds and a golden scroll on the bottom with the National Motto that reads: LONG GOD YUMI STANAP (In Bislama for, "WITH GOD WE STAND", i.e. "In God we trust"). The Bislama "long" is a preposition derived from the word "along" and has several flexible meanings, "in, on, at," and "with." When used referring to another with personhood, it is generally understood to mean "with (said person)." The original version was designed in 1980 by Australian artist Richard Charles "Rick" Fraser, a Vietnam Veteran who emigrated to the New Hebrides with his family mid 1970. Rick Fraser also designed the national emblem of Vanuatu, and co-designed the national flag with Father Walter Lini, the then Prime Minister, who both made edits to the winning flag designed by a schoolboy. Since this Vanuatu national symbol does not conform to the rules of heraldry for a traditional coat of arms, then it could be considered a national emblem instead (national emblem of Vanuatu).

== Historical emblems ==
Badge of the British New Hebrides (1906–1953)

Badge of the British New Hebrides (1953–1980)

Badge used on a New Hebrides postage stamp (1969)
