= Emblem of the Democratic Republic of the Congo =

National emblem

Arms of the Democratic Republic of the Congo

Versions
- Presidential Seal
- Armiger: Democratic Republic of the Congo
- Adopted: 2006
- Shield: A leopard head, surrounded by an elephant tusk to the left and a spear to the right
- Motto: Justice, Paix, Travail "Justice, Peace, Labor"

The national emblem of the Democratic Republic of the Congo has changed several times since 1997. The current one was introduced in 2006 and depicts a leopard head, surrounded by an elephant tusk to the left and a spear to the right. Below are the three words which make up the national motto: Justice, Paix, Travail (Justice, Peace, Work in French). It was adopted on 18 February 2006 by President Joseph Kabila.

The arms are described in detail in Section 1, Article 1 of the 2005 constitution.

The old emblem, which was introduced in 2003, depicted three interlocked hands surrounded by two laurel branches. At the top is a lion head and at the bottom the motto Démocratie, Justice, Unité (Democracy, Justice, Unity in French).

The coat of arms of the Democratic Republic of the Congo from 1999 consists of a light blue shield. In the middle is a yellow star, above which there are six smaller stars. This coat of arms was introduced along with the flag.

An even older arms from 1971 to 1997, when the nation was known as Zaire, depicted a leopard head, below it a pair of crossed spears, around it a branch and an elephant tusk. The words Paix, Justice, Travail are written on a white band under the spears. This device was officially introduced on 1 August 1964.

== Gallery ==
Coat of arms of the Kingdom of Kongo (1528–1541)

Coat of arms of the
Congo Free State (1885–1908)

Coat of arms of the Belgian Congo (1908–1960)

Coat of arms of the Belgian Congo and Ruanda-Urundi (mid-20th century)

Coat of arms of the Congo (1960–1963)

Coat of arms of the Congo (1963–1971)

Variant coat of arms of the Congo (1963–1971)

Coat of arms of Zaire (1971–1997)

Variant coat of arms of Zaire (1971–1997)

Coat of arms of the Congo (1997–1999)

Greater coat of arms of the Democratic Republic of Congo (1999-2003)

Coat of arms of the Congo (1999–2003)

Proposed coat of arms of the Congo (2001)

Coat of arms of the Transitional Government of the Democratic Republic of the Congo (2003–2006)

=== Unilaterally declared states ===
Coat of arms of the State of Katanga (1960–1963)

Coat of arms of South Kasai (1960–1962)

Coat of arms of the People's Republic of the Congo (Stanleyville) (1964-1965)

Emblem of the New Zaire Government in Exile (2017-present)

== Subnational emblems ==
Some of the Provinces of the Democratic Republic of the Congo have adopted their own distinctive emblems, others use the national emblem of the Democratic Republic of the Congo.

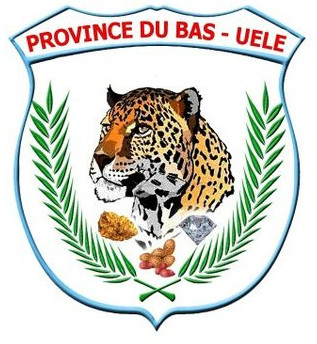
Bas-Uélé

Équateur Province

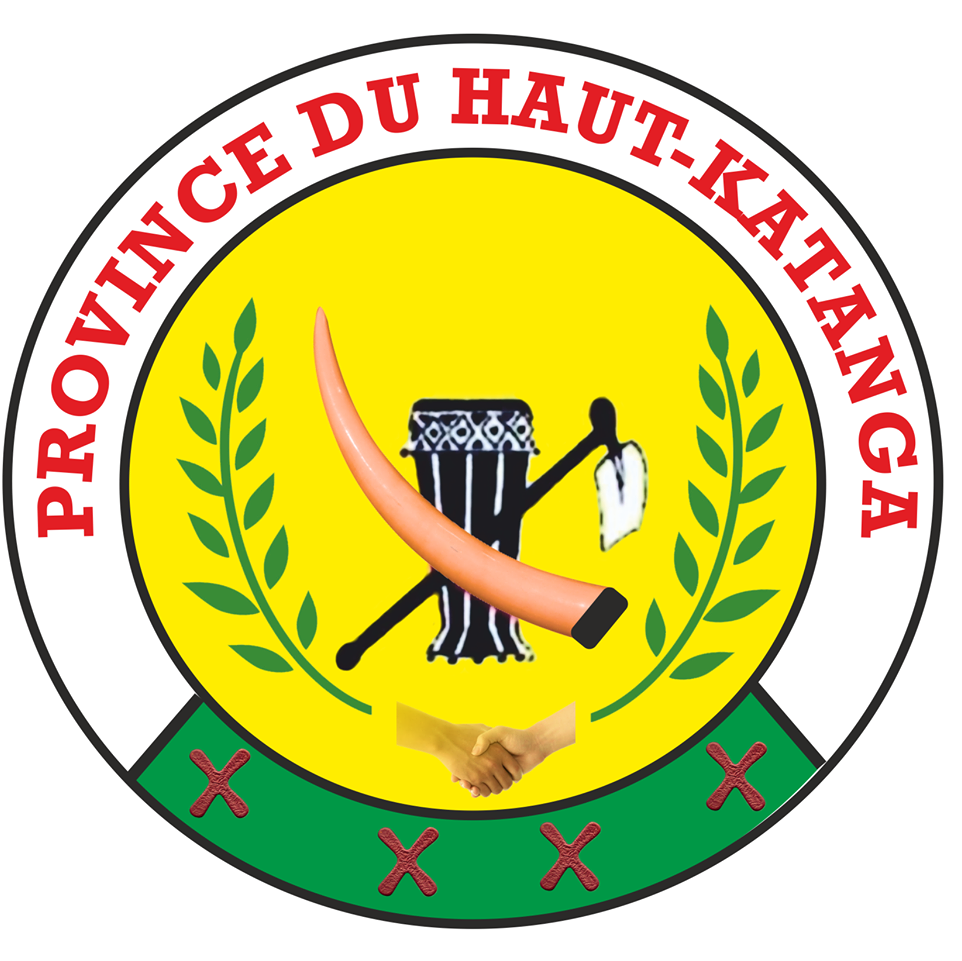
Haut-Katanga Province

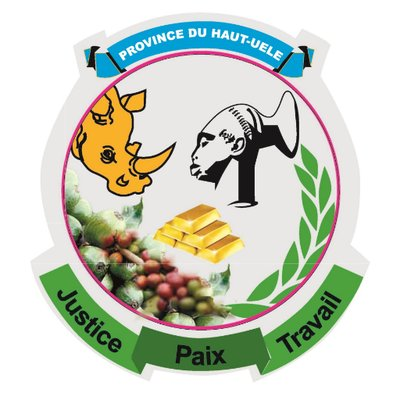
Haut-Uélé

Haut-Lomami

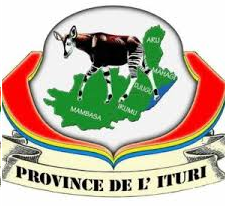
Ituri Province

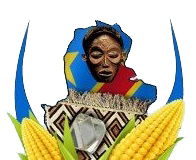
Kasaï Province

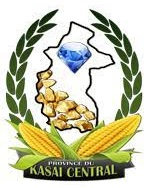
Kasaï-Central

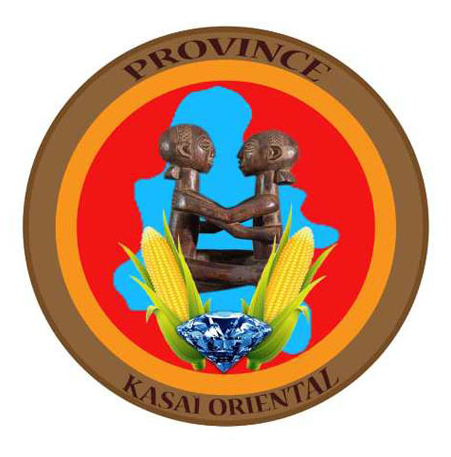
Kasaï-Oriental

Kinshasa

Kongo Central

Kwango

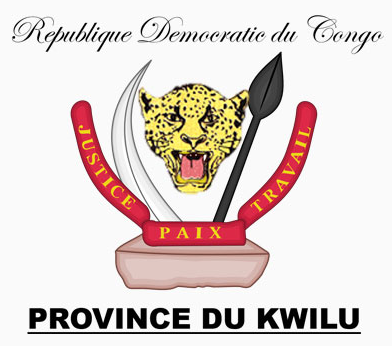
Kwilu Province

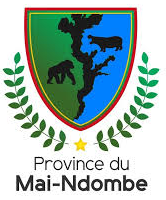
Mai-Ndombe Province

Lomami Province

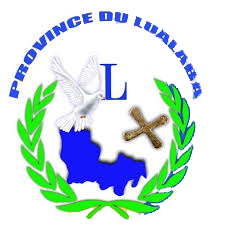
Lualaba Province

Mongala

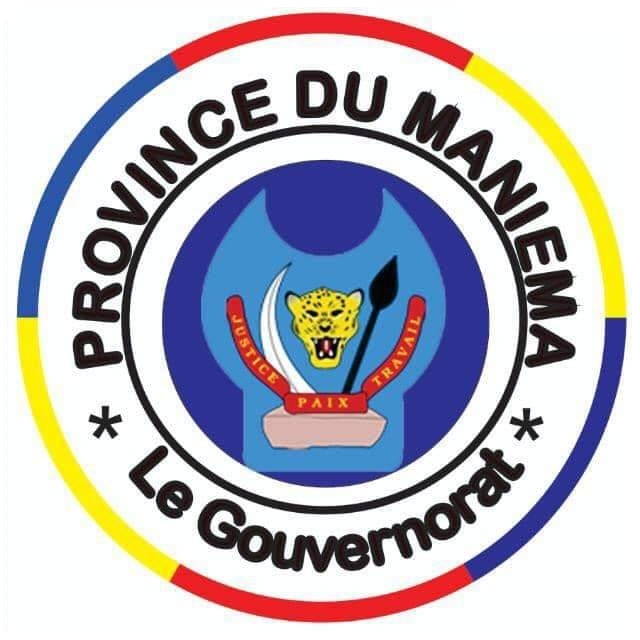
Maniema

Nord-Ubangi

North Kivu

Sankuru

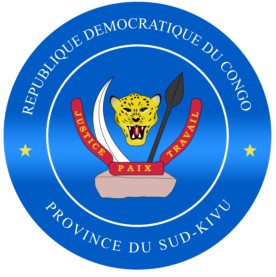
South Kivu

Sud-Ubangi

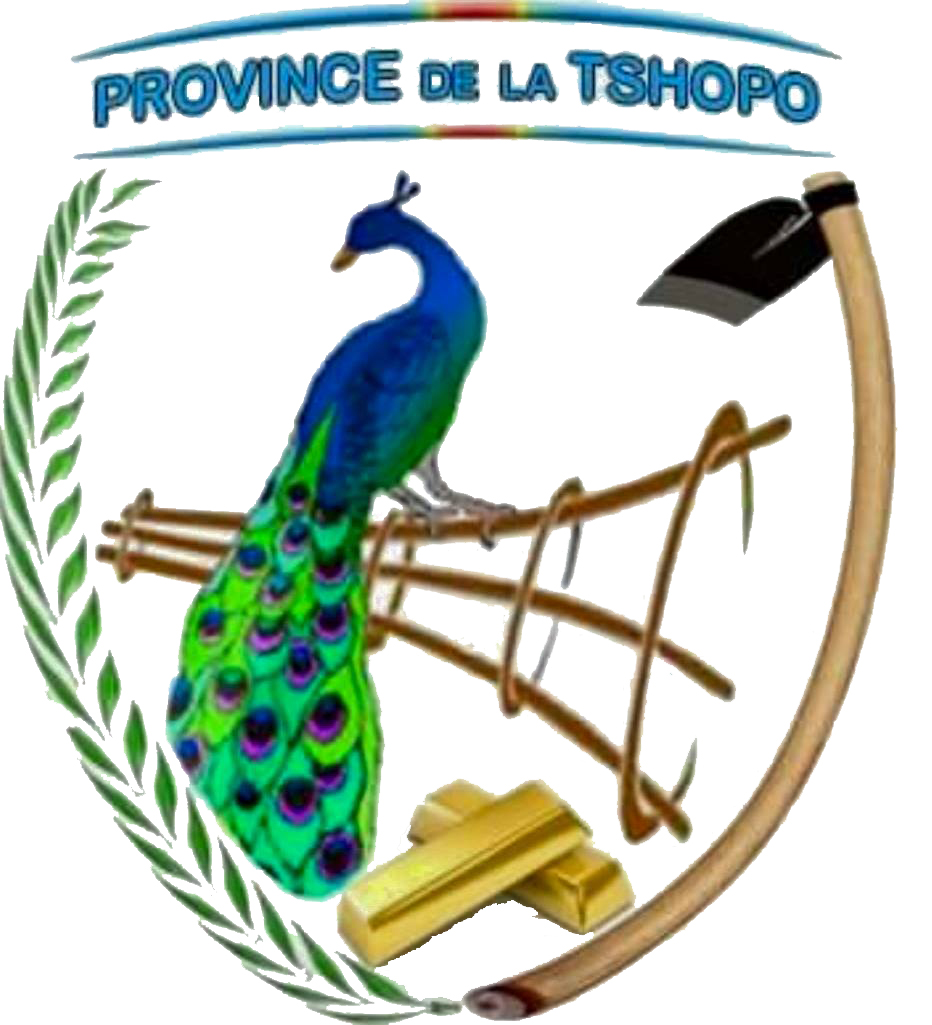
Tshopo

Tshuapa

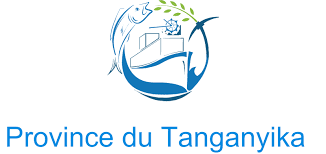
Tanganyika Province

== See also ==
- Armorial of Africa
- Flag of the Democratic Republic of the Congo
