= National emblem =

Seal reserved for use by a nation state or multi-national state

The Emblem of Italy. The emblem, shaped as a Roman wreath, comprises a white five-pointed star, the Stella d'Italia (English: "Star of Italy"), which is the oldest national symbol of Italy, since it dates back to the Graeco-Roman tradition.

A national emblem is an emblem that is reserved for use by a nation state or multi-national state as a symbol of that nation. Many nations have a seal or emblem in addition to a national flag.

Other national symbols, such as national birds, trees, flowers, etc., are listed at lists of national symbols.

== Terms: emblem, coats of arms, seal ==
The design of an emblem is different to that of a coat of arms which should follow the rules of heraldry and so contain a shield (escutcheon) in the center. However, many unheraldic national emblems are colloquially called national coats of arms anyway, because they are used for the same purposes as national coats of arms.

Some designs of national emblems can be used one-to-one for a national seal.

Some national emblems may be facsimiles of seals, which along with their traditional usage can be used in lieu of a coat of arms or emblem. The obverse of the Great Seal of the United States is commonly used like this, and itself features the coat of arms of the United States.

Coats of arms have a shield or escutcheon in the center.
(Coat of arms of Antigua and Barbuda)

The Emblem of Haiti looks like a coat of arms but has no shield.

The Emblem of Mexico is officially called the "Coat of arms of Mexico" even though there is no heraldic shield.

The National Emblem of Indonesia as it is called, even though it qualifies to be called a coat of arms (there are escutcheon, motto, and supporter).

An example for a national coat of arms (achievement) on a seal.
(Great Seal of the United States).

The National Seal of Brazil is usually used only as a seal, rather than an emblem, but is defined as a national symbol.

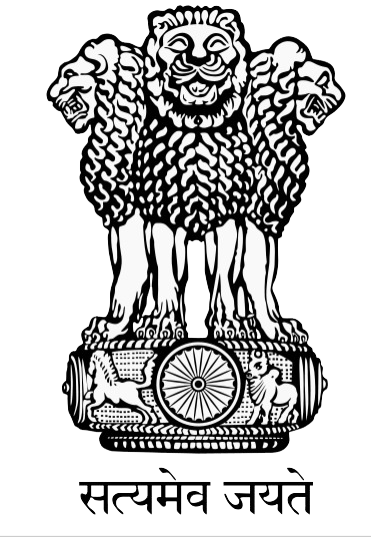
Emblem of India with enscription "Satyameva Jayate" meaning truth prevails in Sanskrit and used during King Ashoka's Reign

== See also ==
- National symbol
- Armorial of sovereign states
- Armorial of Africa
- Armorial of North America
- Armorial of Asia
- Armorial of Europe
- Armorial of Oceania
