= Coat of arms of Nauru =

- Armiger: Republic of Naoero
- Adopted: 2020
- Crest: Twelve-pointed star
- Motto: God's Will First
- Earlier version
- Use: 1968-2020

The coat of arms of Nauru originated in 1968 following the declaration of independence, and it began to be used officially in the early 1970s. The current version of the arms, a refined expression of the original design, has been in use since 2020.

== Symbolism ==
The official symbolism of the emblem as in The National Anthem Emblem and Flag Protection Act 2018 states: The shield is divided into three sections. In the upper section the alchemical symbol of phosphorus is shown over a golden woven background, the woven background symbolises the people of Nauru. The lower left section is silver and depicts a black frigatebird, the national bird of Nauru, sitting on a perch over blue ocean waves. The lower right section is blue and contains a branch of 7 tomano (calophyllum) flowers with six leaves. The shield is surrounded by images of traditional tribal gear known as ikiriri, which was worn to ceremonies - ropes from palm leaves, feathers of the frigatebird and shark teeth. The 12-pointed star above the shield is taken from the flag, where it symbolises the 12 Nauruan tribes.

The ribbon above it bears the name of the island in Micronesian Nauruan: Naoero. The ribbon under the shield bears the national motto of the Republic of Nauru: God's Will First.

In a 2019 act the official interpretation was changed slightly. The alchemical symbol was reinterpreted to be the Christian cross sitting on Mount Calvary, reflecting the countries Christian population and de-emphasising phosphorate extraction. Other minor changes were the ropes made from palm leaves were stated to be from coconut husks and the shark teeth were Argopecten shells.

== History ==
The emblem was adopted in 1968 and used continually until the present, with minor stylistic modifications in 2020.

The emblem was not changed by the country changing the spelling of its English name in 2026, since the writing was already in Nauruan so followed the Nauruan spelling conventions.
