= Coat of arms of Gabon =

National coat of arms of the Gabonese Republic

- Armiger: Gabonese Republic
- Adopted: 15 July 1963
- Shield: Or, a ship sable, masts of the same, with the flag of Gabon, tierced in fess vert, or and azure, sailing upon a sea azure; a chief vert charged with three bezants.
- Supporters: Two black panthers
- Compartment: Okoumé tree
- Motto: Union, Travail, Justice "Unity, Work, Justice"

The coat of arms of Gabon was designed by the Swiss heraldist and vexillologist Louis Mühlemann, one of the founding members of the FIAV and the designer of the coat of arms of the Republic of Congo. It has been in use since 15 July 1963.

== Official description ==
The government of Gabon describes the coat of arms as follows:

Or, a ship sable, masts of the same, with the flag of Gabon, tierced in fess vert, or and azure, sailing upon a sea azure; a chief vert charged with three bezants.

Only the blazon of the escutcheon is mentioned by the government. Other elements are mentioned, but not as a part of the blazon. The supporters are "two black panthers", and the compartment is an Aucoumea klaineana. The motto is "UNION, TRAVAIL, JUSTICE" in capital letters or on a field azure, and the slogan "UNITI PROGREDIEMUR" in capital letters sable.

== Symbolism ==
The supporters of the symbol are panthers which symbolize the vigilance and courage of the president who protects the nation. The bezants (golden discs) in chief of the shield symbolize the mineral wealth of the country. The ship at the lower part represents Gabon moving towards a brighter future. According to Briggs, "green represents the great dense forests; yellow, the sun; blue, the sea; and black, the people of Africa". The okoumé tree at the top of the shield symbolizes the timber trade.

The coat of arms is unusual in having two ribbons with mottos in two different languages. The ribbon below the shield has a motto in French 'UNION, TRAVAIL, JUSTICE' ('Unity, Work, Justice'). The second ribbon is placed beneath the branches of the okoumé tree and has a motto in Latin 'UNITI PROGREDIEMUR' ('We shall go forward united').

== See also ==
- Flag of Gabon
