= Coat of arms of Jordan =

Emblem of the Hashemite Kingdom of Jordan
- Armiger: King Abdullah II of Jordan
- Adopted: 1921
- Motto: Left: "He who seeks support and guidance from God"; Middle: "King of the Hashemite Kingdom of Jordan"; Right: "Abdullah II bin Al Hussein bin Aoun"
- Order: Supreme Order of the Renaissance

The coat of arms of Jordan or the emblem of the Hashemite Kingdom of Jordan is the arms of dominion for the king of Jordan. The emblem was initially adopted by Abdullah I, the emir of Transjordan, in 1921. The emblem continued to be used after Transjordan emerged as an independent kingdom in 1946.

== History ==
On August 25, 1934, the Executive Council (the Council of Ministers at the time) issued Directive No. 558 declaring the coat of arms of the Emirate of Trans-Jordan (as the state, a British protectorate, was called at the time). The arms had been originally designed in 1921 at the request of Emir Abdullah I as the official emblem of the country, outlining its specific design layout at that time. The emirate, which had been established in April 1921, officially became the Hashemite Kingdom of Transjordan upon its declaration of independence in May 1946, officially becoming independent on 17 June 1946. The state was officially renamed as the Hashemite Kingdom of Jordan in April 1949.

On 21 February 1982, the Council of Ministers issued the official Notification No. 6, which gave written specifications and explanations of the official emblem of the country.

== Description ==
The emblem was officially described in a notification issued by the Council of Ministers in 1982.

The Royal Hashemite Crown represents the monarchy of the Hashemite Kingdom of Jordan and is composed of five arches with beaded design, fanning out from beneath its pinnacle and attached to the base with a relief design recalling rubies and emeralds. On top of the base rest five lotus flowers, denoting purity. The Royal Hashemite Crown is adorned at the top by the tip of a spear that represents the Hashemite banner. The Royal Hashemite Crown rests on the mantle that represents the Royal Hashemite Throne. The crimson velvet mantle, lined with white silk, signifies sacrifice and purity. The mantle is trimmed in a fringe of golden threads and gathered on either side with golden tasselled cords to reveal a white silk lining.

The two flags represent the flag of the Great Arab Revolt. The length of each is double its width and each is divided horizontally into three equal parts: the upper black panel, the middle green panel and the lower white panel. The crimson triangle occupies the front. Its base is equal to the width of the flag while its length is equal to half that of the flag. The eagle symbolises power, fortitude and loftiness. Its colours signify the banner and turban of the Islamic prophet, Muhammad. The eagle stands on the globe, its wings touching the flags on both ends. The eagle's head faces its right. The blue globe signifies the emergence of Islamic civilisation.

In the coat of arms appears Arab weaponry. A bronze shield is decorated with a chrysanthemum, a common motif in Arab art and architecture. The shield is placed in front of the globe, symbolising the defence of the right. Golden swords and spears, bows and arrows protrude from either side of the shield and the globe. Encircling the shield from its base are three ears of wheat on the right and a palm frond to the left. They are attached to the ribbon of the Al Nahda First Order Medal.

The medal of Al Nahda First Order is suspended from the centre of the ribbon. A yellow ribbon placed across the ribbon of the Supreme Order of the Renaissance, is composed of three parts inscribed with phrases, as follows: "Abdullah I ibn Al Hussein Bin Aoun (Aoun, the great-grandfather of Sharif Al Hussein Bin Ali)" on the right, "King of the Hashemite Kingdom of Jordan" in the middle and "He who seeks support and guidance from God" on the left.

== See also ==
- Coat of arms of Iraq
