= National seal of the Comoros =

National Seal of the Comoros
- Armiger: Union of the Comoros
- Adopted: 2001
- Motto: Unité, Solidarité, Développement ('Unity, Solidarity, Development')

The national seal of the Comoros has the crescent found on the national flag in the center; within this crescent are the four stars found on the flag. A sun with rays extended is right above the crescent. Around the focal point, the name of the nation (Union of the Comoros) is written in both French and Arabic. The border is composed of two olive branches, with the national motto at the bottom in French.

== Gallery ==
Seal of the State of the Comoros (1975–1978)

Seal of the Federal Islamic Republic of the Comoros and the Union of the Comoros (1978–2001)

Seal of the Union of the Comoros (2001-present)

== See also ==
- Armorial of Africa
- Flag of the Comoros
