= Seal of Palau =

National seal of the Republic of Palau

- Armiger: Republic of Palau
- Shield: a disk shows the traditional bai, a meeting-house, stands on sixteen stones and the flag on the flagstaff with the Name of the Emblem itself: "OFFICIAL SEAL" and the year "1981" under the stones
- Motto: Olbiil era Kelulau; The House of the whispered decisions Republic of Palau
- Other elements: the Bai is surrounded by two names: in above, the Name of the National Congress of Palau, known as: "OLBIIL ERA KELULAU" (In Palauan for, "THE HOUSE OF THE WHISPERED DECISIONS") and the Name of the State in below

The Seal of Palau depicts a traditional meeting center. The executive seal, used by overseas missions and by the nation's president, is also of a similar design.

The seal also resembles the seal of the Trust Territory of the Pacific Islands, the governing body which formerly controlled Palau.

== Historical coats of arms ==
Coat of arms of Spain, until 1899

Coat of arms of the German Empire, 1899–1914

Proposed arms of German New Guinea, 1914

Emblem of Imperial Japan, 1914–1944

Emblem of the South Seas Mandate

Coat of arms of the United States, 1944–1981

Emblem of the United Nations, 1947–1965

Emblem of the Trust Territory of the Pacific Islands, 1965–1980
