= Seal of the Federated States of Micronesia =

National seal

- Armiger: Federated States of Micronesia
- Adopted: 1986
- Shield: A light blue disk with an arc of four white five-pointed stars and the sprouted coconut floating in the ocean and the white listel on the bottom with the National Motto and the year "1979" on the bottom.
- Motto: PEACE, UNITY, LIBERTY; GOVERNMENT OF THE FEDERATED STATES OF MICRONESIA
- Other elements: The seal is surrounded by the yellow circle, which is sometimes in the form of a cable and encircles the name of the Government and the blue cable as an outer circle.

The Seal of the Federated States of Micronesia is an official symbol of the government of the Federated States of Micronesia. It resembles the previous seal of the Trust Territory of the Pacific Islands, and reads "Government of the Federated States of Micronesia". The seal was adopted by the Congress of the Federated States of Micronesia and then accepted by the United States Congress.
