= Coat of arms of Senegal =

- Armiger: Republic of Senegal
- Adopted: 1965
- Crest: Green star
- Shield: Per pale, the first Gules a lion rampant Or, the second Or, a baobab-tree proper and in base a fess wavy Vert
- Supporters: Palm leaves
- Motto: Un Peuple, Un But, Une Foi "One Nation, One Goal, One Faith"
- Order: Star of the National Order of the Lion

The coat of arms of Senegal is the heraldic device consisting of a shield charged with a lion on the left half and a baobab tree on the right, flanked by palm branches and topped with a five-pointed green star at the top.

Adopted five years after Senegal gained independence, it has been the coat of arms of the Republic of Senegal since 1965. Both symbols on the shield had featured previously on earlier Senegalese emblems.

== History ==
Senegal gained independence on 20 August 1960, when it separated from the Mali Federation and became an independent country on its own. It took approximately five years to before Senegal adopted its own coat of arms. It was designed by Suzanne Gautheir, a French heraldist from Paris, in 1965. It incorporated the lion and the baobab tree - both symbols were previously utilised on earlier Senegalese emblems.

Coat of arms of the Mali Federation from 1959-1960

Coat of arms of Senegal from 1960-1965

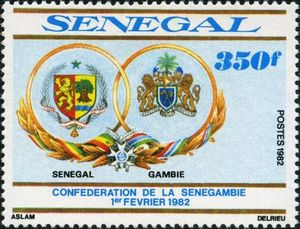
Possible Coat of Arms of The Senegambia Confederation from 1982-1989

== Design ==
=== Symbolism ===
The colours and objects on the coat of arms carry cultural, political, and regional meanings. The green star at the crest is identical to the one on Senegal's flag. It alludes to Islam, the religion practiced by 94% of Senegal's population. It is also possible that it might have derived from the Serer religious symbol "Yoonir" which has been used as a religious and cultural symbol by the Serer people of Senegal, the Gambia and Mauritania long before Islam penetrated the Senegambia region, and long before it became an Islamic symbol - with roots to the Ottoman Empire flag. For more on the five-pointed star's Serer religious connection, see the Serer creation myth and Yoonir. President Léopold Sédar Senghor, under whose administration this coat was drawn was not a Muslim but a Roman Catholic. He was also a Serer and a strong advocate for Serer religion and culture - even in his works.

The dexter (i.e. proper right) of the escutcheon features a lion. A national symbol of Senegal, it stands for strength and represents the northern Senegalese ethnic group, which forms the majority of the population. Historically it was a symbol of power for kings, before the French colonised Senegal.

On the arms' sinister, a baobab tree is depicted, which is native to Senegal. Located just beneath it is a green wavy line that epitomises the Senegal River. The order underneath the escutcheon is that of the National Order of the Lion. Both the lion and the baobab tree, which featured previously on earlier Senegalese emblems, are now utilised on the country's two seals. The seal with the baobab tree is used to stamp any acts relating to public administration, while the lion seal is used exclusively by the President for significant acts of state, such as international agreements.

=== Similarities ===
The country's motto—"One People, One Goal, One Faith" (French: Un Peuple, Un But, Une Foi)—is exactly the same as Mali's.

== See also ==
- Flag of Senegal
