= Coat of arms of Lesotho =

National coat of arms of the Kingdom of Lesotho

Versions
- 1966–2006
- Armiger: King Mohato Bereng Seeiso
- Adopted: 4 October 2006
- Compartment: The summit of Thaba Bosiu
- Motto: Khotso, Pula, Nala "Peace, Rain, Prosperity"

The coat of arms of Lesotho was adopted on 4 October 2006, after Lesotho's 40th anniversary of independence. Pictured is a koena (crocodile) on a Basotho shield. This is the symbol of the dynasty of Lesotho's largest ethnicity, the Bakoena. Behind the shield there are two crossed weapons, an assegai (lance) and a knobkierie (club). To the left and right of the shield are supporters of the shield, two Basotho horses. In the foreground there is a ribbon with the national motto of Lesotho: Khotso, Pula, Nala (Sesotho, to English: Peace, Rain, Prosperity). The crocodile on the shield has been retained from the arms of Basutoland, the predecessor to Lesotho.

== Colonial Basutoland ==
The colony of Basutoland was granted a coat of arms on 20 March 1951. These arms depicted a crocodile and featured the motto KHOTSO KE NALA (Peace is Prosperity).

Coat of arms of colonial Basutoland

== See also ==
- Flag of Lesotho
