= National coat of arms =

Coat of arms of a sovereign state

A national coat of arms is a symbol which denotes an independent state in the form of a heraldic achievement. While a national flag is usually used by the population at large and is flown outside and on ships, a national coat of arms is normally considered a symbol of the government or (especially in monarchies) the head of state personally and tends to be used in print, on armorial ware, and as a wall decoration in official buildings. The royal arms of a monarchy, which may be identical to the national arms, are sometimes described as arms of dominion or arms of sovereignty.

An important use for national coats of arms is as the main symbol on the covers of passports, the document used internationally to prove the citizenship of a person. Another use for national coats of arms is as a symbol on coins of the associated state for general circulation.

For a symbol to be called a "national coat of arms", it should follow the rules of heraldry. If it does not, then the symbol is not formally a coat of arms but rather a national emblem. However, many unheraldic national emblems are colloquially called national coats of arms anyway, because they are used for the same purposes as national coats of arms.

== Types of national coats of arms ==
=== Heraldic achievements ===
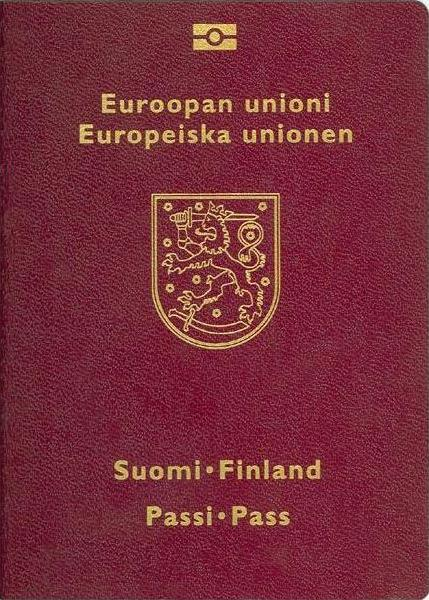
The Finnish coat of arms on the front cover of a Finnish passport with both Swedish and Finnish text.

The original national coats of arms were (and continue to be) heraldic arms, which have a shield (escutcheon) which carries symbols upon it (charges) and often other symbols such as a crown on top of the shield and supporters. In the real sense of the word, these national coats of arms are the only ones which should be called coats of arms, since that term reflects that the emblem used is following the rules of heraldry. Heraldry originated in Western Europe and has now spread to all parts of the world.

Up until the 20th century, most independent nations in the industrialised world were monarchies and therefore used the monarchistic style of coat of arms. This style is illustrated below by the coat of arms of Sweden and the coat of arms of the United Kingdom^{[a]}, both of which are still in use. Characteristic of this style are the escutcheon (shield) of the kingdom, the supporters on either side (usually beasts as in these cases, but may also be birds, fishes, humans/humanoids or even inanimate objects as depicted on the coat of arms of Spain) and the crown topping the arms. The crown on the UK arms is specifically the Tudor Crown.^{[a]} Both also feature a symbol of the monarch's chivalric order encircling the escutcheon: the chain of the Order of the Seraphim on the Swedish arms and the belt of the Order of the Garter on the UK's arms.^{[a]} A motto is often present either below or above the escutcheon (as shown on the UK arms); this is absent on the Swedish arms. In common with many European monarchies, the Swedish arms features a representation of a royal robe (see mantle and pavilion) topped with another crown, which became common around the 19th century (and which can also be seen in the Romanian arms below); this type of mantle does not feature at all in British heraldry. The Swedish arms also feature an inescutcheon, a secondary escutcheon within the main one which represents, in this case, the monarch's dynasty although they may also represent other things; the UK arms featured an inescutcheon from 1801, representing Hanover, until 1837, when it was removed. When used by the monarch, the UK arms features a helmet with mantling and crest which are absent from the version of the arms used by the state, and also from the Swedish arms. These features were all commonly used among the arms of European kingdoms.

The lion (sometimes referred to as a leopard when depicted walking; not to be confused with the non-heraldic leopard), being a symbol of power and sovereignty, as well as of Jesus (the Lion of Judah), is a common charge on monarchal coats of arms and features on the coats of arms of all surviving European kingdoms (i.e. the coats of arms of Belgium, Denmark, Luxembourg, the Netherlands, Norway, Spain (where it represents León), Sweden, and the UK), as well as several former monarchies.

There is much diversity in the coats of arms of the European republics. Many have chosen to use the same coat of arms they used as monarchies (or as part of monarchies) or a modified version of it. Finland for example uses the former coat of arms of the Grand Duke of Finland, a title held by the Swedish Monarch until 1809 and then by the Russian Emperor until 1917. Other examples include Bulgaria, the Czech Republic, and Estonia, all of which also feature lions.

Like lions, eagles were common charges in the arms of many former European monarchies (although they do not feature on the arms of any surviving European monarchies). Double-headed eagles were also associated with imperial power (specifically that of the Byzantine, Holy Roman, Austrian, Serbian and Russian Empires). Single-headed eagles can be found today on the coats of arms of Poland, Germany, and Romania; double-headed eagles can be found on the coats of arms of Russia (without the ermine mantling and crown of the Russian Empire), Serbia, Montenegro, and Albania. Austria uses a single-headed eagle as a supporter for its coat of arms, but this is officially unrelated to and distinct from the double-headed eagle used by the former Austrian Empire; the escutcheon (gules, a fess argent) is however a pre-republic symbol dating back to the middle ages. Eagles also feature prominently as supporters on the coats of arms of Arab states, having been derived from the Eagle of Saladin. These include the coats of arms of Egypt, Iraq (see below) and Palestine, and formerly on the coats of arms of Libya, Yemen, and the United Arab Republic.

Many former European colonies have chosen to use a heraldic coat of arms, but with no connection to the coat of arms used by the colonizing empires. Australia and Jamaica are examples of countries that have created such a modern coat of arms according to old heraldic principles. These two nations also have chosen not to use a crown on top of their coats of arms although they formally are monarchies (Australia, however, does use St Edward's Crown within the coat of arms, on the parts representing Queensland and Victoria). The coat of arms of Uganda below is a typical example of an African coat of arms, with a tribal shield supported by native animals.

Often, a country will employ different versions of their coats of arms for different purposes. For example, many have a heavily simplified "lesser" version of their arms, with the full or "greater" version being restricted for use by the monarch or in other specific circumstances.

Coat of arms of Australia

Coat of arms of Austria

Coat of arms of Belgium

Coat of arms of Bulgaria

Coat of arms of Denmark

Coat of arms of Estonia

Coat of arms of Fiji

Coat of arms of Finland

Coat of arms of Georgia

Coat of arms of Germany

Coat of arms of Greece

Coat of arms of Iceland

Coat of arms of Indonesia

Coat of arms of Iraq

Coat of arms of Israel

Coat of arms of Jamaica

Coat of arms of the Philippines

Coat of arms of Latvia

Coat of arms of Lithuania

Coat of arms of Malaysia

Coat of arms of Moldova

Coat of arms of the Netherlands

Coat of arms of New Zealand

Coat of arms of Norway

Coat of arms of Pakistan

Coat of arms of Portugal

Coat of arms of Romania

Coat of arms of Serbia

Coat of arms of Slovenia

Coat of arms of South Africa

Coat of arms of Spain

Coat of arms of Sweden

Coat of arms of Switzerland

Coat of arms of Tanzania

Coat of arms of Ukraine

Coat of arms of the United Kingdom (as used outside Scotland)^{[a]}

Royal coat of arms of Scotland

Coat of arms of the United States

Coat of arms of Uruguay

^a In Scotland a separate version of the coat of arms is used which gives precedence to the Scottish elements. It places the royal arms of Scotland in the first and fourth quarters of the escutcheon (and places the royal arms of England in the second quarter), replaces the order belt, the crown atop the helmet, the motto and the lion crest with Scottish equivalents (the chain of the Order of the Thistle, the Crown of Scotland, Nemo me impune lacessit, the red lion holding the sword and sceptre), reverses the order of the supporters, crowns the unicorn (with the Crown of Scotland, which is also worn by the lion supporter and lion crest) and replaces the shamrocks and Tudor roses with Scottish thistles. It also adds another motto banner above the crest (In defens) and places a Scottish and English flag on poles in the arms of the supporters.

=== National seals ===
In some countries a national seal may be used as an emblem. Seals are used for authenticating documents by stamping an impression on them. Seals can themselves contain coats of arms or other symbolism. The Great Seal of the United States is a prominent example of a seal used as a national symbol, and state and local government in the United States uses seals in a similar way. In most countries seals are usually just used to authenticate documents, but, as in Canada, may still be considered a national symbol.

Great Seal of Canada (1955–2025)

Great Seal of Canada (2025–)

Seal of Comoros

Great Seal of France

Seal of State of Italian Republic

Great Seal of the United States, the national coat of arms originated as part of the seal

=== National emblems ===
An emblem which does not follow the rules of heraldry, but which fulfills the same use as a national coat of arms, can be called a national emblem. These are often used by countries whose regimes are or once were revolutionary, or have their own local rules on national symbolism, and therefore did not use traditional European-style heraldry.

Emblem of Bangladesh

Emblem of Haiti

Emblem of India

Emblem of Iran

Emblem of Italy

Emblem of Maldives

Emblem of Nepal

Emblem (coat of arms) of Nicaragua

Emblem of Saudi Arabia

Emblem of South Korea

Emblem of Sri Lanka

Emblem of Turkey

=== National emblems of the East Asian tradition ===
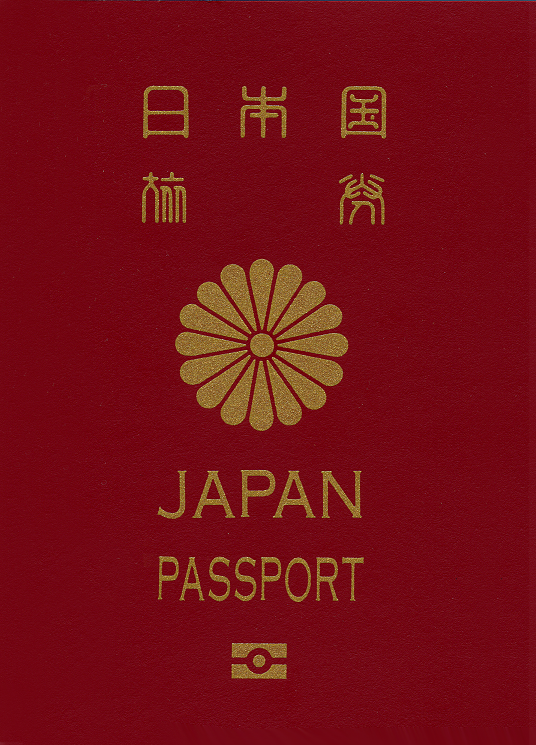
The Imperial Seal inscribed on the front cover of a Japanese passport.

The Japanese equivalent to a heraldic coat of arms is the mon (Japanese: 紋, "sign" or "emblem"), which in its use can be compared to heraldry of the Western world. Similar symbols are common throughout East Asia.

Imperial Seal of Japan

Imperial Seal of Korea

The Blue Sky with a White Sun national emblem of the Republic of China (1928–present)

The Twelve Symbols national emblem of the Republic of China (1913–1928)

Emblem of Bhutan

=== Socialist state emblems ===
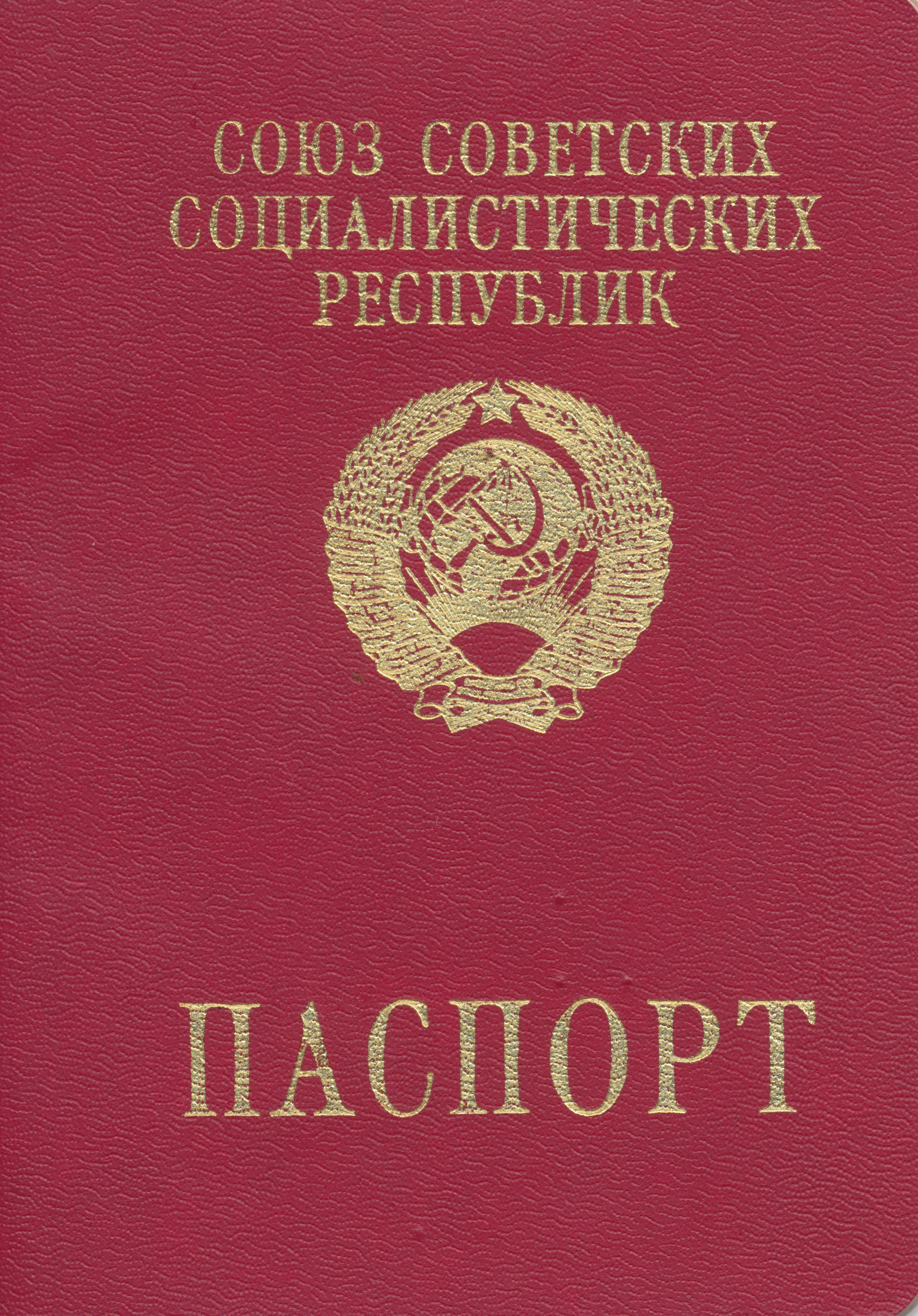
The Soviet Union "socialist coat of arms" on the front cover of a Soviet Union passport

Many countries which came under the influence of the Soviet Union during the 20th century took after the design of the State Emblem of the Soviet Union, created in the 1920s. The forms followed a very common pattern and since these national emblems were used in the same way as traditional heraldic coats of arms, even if they did not follow the rules of heraldry, they have been called "socialist heraldry". Many of them incorporated symbols of industry and agriculture (particularly wheat), the hammer and sickle, a raising sun and the red star of communism. It was not uncommon to show landscapes and weapons, as can be seen in the examples below. When giving up communism, most of these countries returned to traditional heraldry – see for instance the coats of arms of Bulgaria, Georgia, Hungary, and Romania.

The designs of socialist heraldry also influenced some non-socialist states, such as Italy. In particular, the emblem of Italy, shaped as a Roman wreath, comprises a white five-pointed star, the Stella d'Italia (English: "Star of Italy"), which is the oldest national symbol of Italy, since it dates back to ancient Greece, with a thin red border, superimposed upon a five-spoked cogwheel, standing between an olive branch to the left side and an oak branch to the right side. The cogwheel surrounding the star refers to Article 1 of the Constitution of the Italian Republic, which states: "Italy is a democratic republic, built on labour."

State Emblem of the Soviet Union

Coat of arms of Transnistria

National emblem of Belarus

Emblem of Italy

Emblem of Angola

Emblem of Mozambique

Emblem of North Korea

Emblem of Laos

National emblem of China

Emblem of Vietnam

National emblem of East Germany

== See also ==
- Armorial of sovereign states
