= Compartment (heraldry) =

Heraldic element placed under the shield

In heraldry, a compartment is a design placed under the shield, usually rocks, a grassy mount (mount vert), or some sort of other landscape upon which the supporters are depicted as standing. Care must be taken to distinguish true compartments from items upon which supporters are merely resting one or more feet, or, sometimes, mere heraldic badges or pure decoration under the shield, and, conversely, care must also be taken in very unusual cases such as the coat of arms of Belize and Gabon, in which what may be taken to be a crest, trees in both coats of arms rising above the shield, is really part of the compartment. It is sometimes said to represent the land held by the bearer. As an official part of the blazon it is a comparatively late feature of heraldry, often derived from the need to have different supporters for different families or entities, although sometimes the compartment is treated in the blazon separately from the supporters.

== Background ==
If the compartment is mentioned in the blazon it forms part of the grant and is an integral part of the arms e.g. the current royal arms of the United Kingdom are required to have a compartment with plant badges. If no compartment is specified in the blazon then whether to draw one is at the discretion of the artist. The current coat of arms of Australia are usually depicted on a compartment of a wreath of wattle, the national flower. It would be acceptable to omit the wattle or substitute something else as it does not form part of the grant.

The decorative flourish which was often placed by heraldic artists under the feet, hooves or paws of supporters, chiefly in the 19th century, was disparagingly known by some as the "gas bracket", although this term never had any official currency. One case in which such a compartment is formally described in the blazon is the "arabesque vert" on which the supporters balance in the coat of arms of Zaanstad. The coat of arms of Michigan is a notable example of the more usual case, as the decorative flourish is specifically noted in its blazon's observations as the conventional design rather than part of the arms grant.

A rare instance in which the supporters stand on the motto scroll is in the arms of New Jersey. The coat of arms of the Netherlands, likewise, features the two lion supporters standing on the motto scroll.

Usually when arms are augmented by supporters, a compartment will be added too. In rare cases, a compartment might be granted as an augmentation. A compartment without supporters is possible but practically unknown, with the exception of the coat of arms of South Australia.

A compartment is usually some kind of landscape (in the case of Scottish chiefs it is generally a "mount vert" - grassy mount covered with the clan's flower) or seascape, and these can be quite elaborate. These elaborate designs particularly feature in more recent Canadian grants, such as the compartment of the University of Northern British Columbia, in which the female Kermode bear and woodland caribou buck stand on a forest, mountain peaks and ears of wheat, all rising out of the conventionalised heraldic representation of water, which is itself charged with an orca.

Compartments can have a specific piece of geography; Kenya's compartment is Mount Kenya and the compartment of Arbeláez, Cundinamarca, Colombia is a globe.

There are some unusual compartments. The compartment of the Association of Universities and Colleges of Canada is a quadrangle. The arms of the former Cumberland County Council have a wall as a compartment, while the Canadian Academy of Engineering has a bridge spanning water. The chief of Clan Donnachaidh has a man in chains as a compartment, while that of Dundas of that Ilk is "a salamander in flames of fire".

Recent compartments can also feature indigenous non-European features. The arms of Gisborne, New Zealand contain another unique compartment, a Māori waka (canoe).

== Examples ==
A seascape compartment in the former coat of arms of Malta.

A mount vert compartment in the coat of arms of Anne, Princess Royal of the United Kingdom.

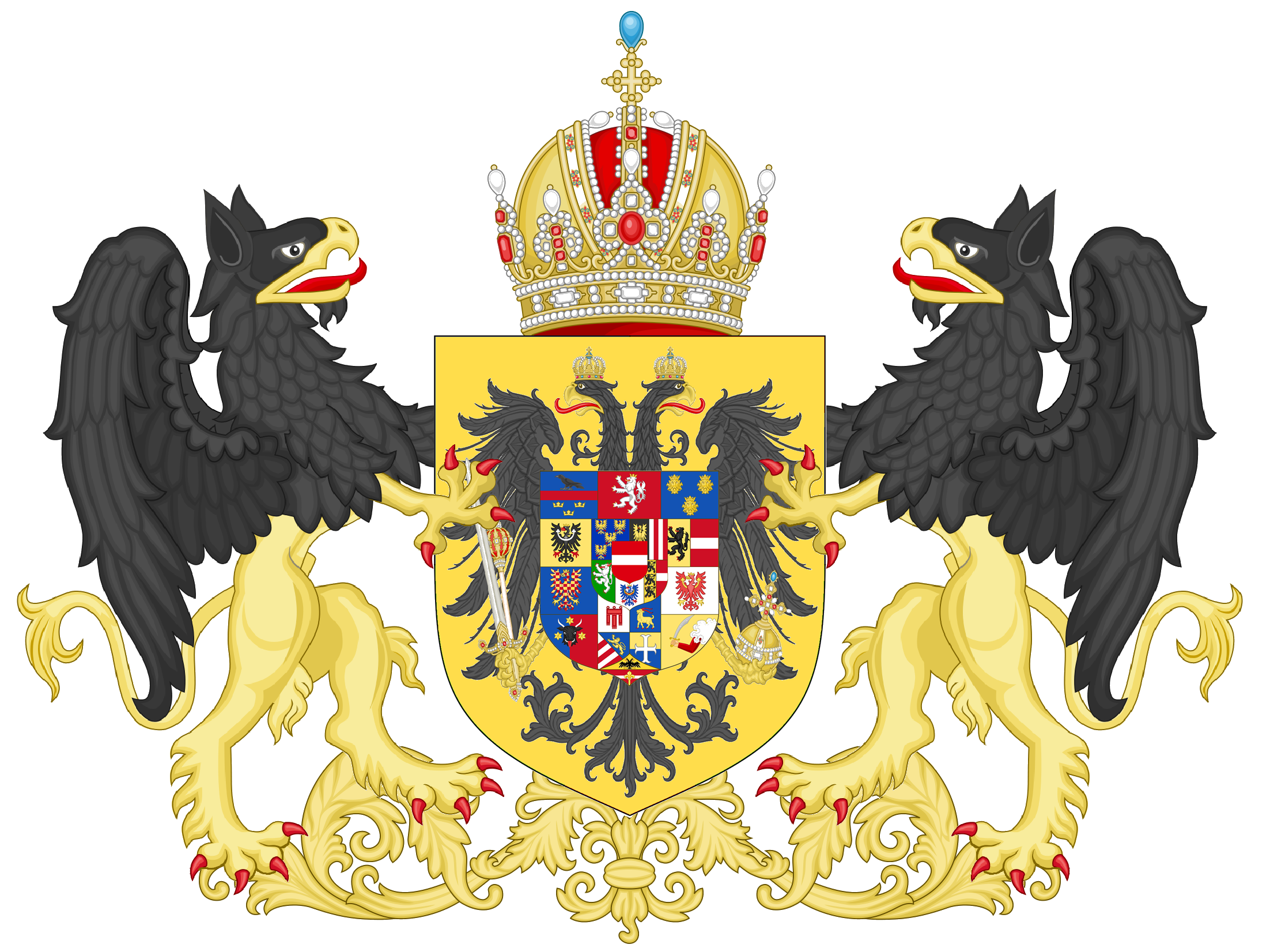
A vegetal compartment (branches) in a 1915 depiction of the Austrian coat of arms.

A pedestal (terrace) compartment in the middle version of the coat of arms of the German Emperor until 1918.

A cloud compartment in the coat of arms of the Kingdom of France.

A compartment of columnar basalt in the Icelandic coat of arms.

Arms of Melfort, Saskatchewan, with the compartment tapissé of wheat.

== Bibliography ==
- Fox-Davies, Arthur Charles (1909). A Complete Guide to Heraldry. London & Edinburgh: T.C. & E.C. Jack.
- Woodcock, Thomas; Robinson, John Martin (1990). The Oxford Guide to Heraldry. Oxford [England]: Oxford University Press.
