= Coat of arms of Burkina Faso =

- Armiger: Burkina Faso
- Adopted: 1997 (Revised in 2025)

The coat of arms of Burkina Faso contains a shield based on the national flag. Above the shield the name of the country is shown, while below it is the national motto, La Patrie ou la Mort, nous vaincrons (French for "Fatherland or death, we shall overcome").

The supporters are two white stallions. The two plants emerging from the lower banner appear to represent pearl millet, an important cereal grain cultivated in this country where agriculture represents 32% of the gross domestic product. This coat of arms is similar to the old Upper Volta coat of arms (see below), with the Burkina Faso flag replacing the Upper Volta flag in the middle. The coat of arms and its meaning is mandated by Law No 020/97/II/AN.

== Official blazon ==
- one escutcheon bearing in the chief on a ribband argent the name of the country: "BURKINA FASO";
- in fess point an inescutcheon of two bands in fess with the banner of arms, sewn upon two crossed spears;
- two stallions rampant argent supporting on each side the escutcheon;
- in base, an open book;
- below, two stalks of millet with three pairs of green leaves in crescent coming from the bottom, and equidistant to the vertical passing through the points of the shield and the upper ray of the star of the flag, crossed and connected in their bases with a ribbon bearing the motto of the country "Unité - Progrès - Justice".

== Historic emblem (1984–2025) ==
Thomas Sankara's 1983–1987 Burkinabé revolution implemented an emblem featuring a crossed daba (a traditional Burkinabé agricultural tool) and AK-47 (an allusion to the Soviet hammer and sickle), with the motto La Patrie ou la Mort, nous vaincrons ("Fatherland or death, we shall overcome"'). This was changed to the 1997 emblem, which looks like the current emblem except the motto read "Unité, Progrès, Travail" ("Unity, Progress, Labour"). The motto on the emblem was changed in 2025 shortly after the adoption of the Sankara-era motto.

Emblem 1984–1997

Coat of Arms before the 2025 revisions

== Coat of arms of Upper Volta ==
This somewhat resembles the current emblem, except that the enclosing shield has a blue background, the inescutcheon is based on the flag of Upper Volta with the superimposed letters "RHV" (for République de Haute-Volta), and the motto was Unité, Travail, Justice ("Unity, Labour, Justice"). Also, there are two hoes and a sorghum plant at the base of the inescutcheon.

Coat of arms of Upper Volta from 1961 to 1984
