= Coat of arms of Guinea =

National coat of arms

- Armiger: Republic of Guinea
- Adopted: 1993
- Motto: Travail, justice, solidarité "Work, Justice, Solidarity"

The present coat of arms of or national seal of Guinea was adopted in 1993.

== Features ==
The Guinean coat of arms features a dove with a golden olive branch in its beak over a ribbon with "Work justice solidarity". The arms formerly also included a crossed sword and rifle. A former coat of arms in 1958 features a shield with an elephant on it. Sources differ on the colours. One version has the shield divided vertically into red and green with a yellow elephant with a white dove/olive branch and white scroll with black writing. Another version has the shield divided vertically into red and yellow with a green elephant with a green dove/olive branch and green scroll with white writing.

== History ==
1958–1984

1984–1993
