= Flags of North America =

A map of North America (without Greenland) with 23 national flags, excluding the flags of the dependencies and other territories.

This is a gallery of flags of North American countries, territories and their affiliated international organizations.

== Flags of North American sovereign states ==
Flag	Date	Use	Description
	1967–present	Flag of Antigua and Barbuda	A red background with a triangle made of black, sky blue, and white, with a sun.
	1973–present	Flag of The Bahamas; See also: List of Bahamian flags	A horizontal triband of yellow, with aquamarine on the top and bottom stripes, with a black equilateral triangle aligned to the hoist-side.
	1966–present	Flag of Barbados; See also: List of Barbadian flags	A vertical triband of yellow, with blue on the left and right stripes, with a black trident in the center.
	2019–present	Flag of Belize; See also: List of Belizean flags	A horizontal triband of blue, with red on the top and bottom stripes, with a coat of arms in the center.
	1965–present	Flag of Canada; See also: List of Canadian flags	The maple leaf at the center has been Canada's national emblem for 150+ years. White represents northern snow. Red represents sacrifice during the First World War.
	1848–present	Flag of Costa Rica; See also: List of Costa Rican flags	
	1906–present	Flag of Cuba; See also: List of Cuban flags	
	1990–present	Flag of Dominica	
	1863–present	Flag of the Dominican Republic; See also: List of Dominican Republic flags	
	1912–present	Flag of El Salvador; See also: List of Salvadoran flags	
	1974–present	Flag of Grenada; See also: List of Grenadian flags	
	1871–present	Flag of Guatemala	
	1986–present	Flag of Haiti; See also: List of Haitian flags	
	1949–2022; 2026–present	Flag of Honduras	
	1962–present	Flag of Jamaica; See also: List of Jamaican flags	
	1968–present	Flag of Mexico; See also: List of Mexican flags	Tricolor design derived from the flag of France, using the red, white, and green of the national army. Coat of arms at the center incorporates the badge of Mexico City.
	1971–present	Flag of Nicaragua	
	1925–present	Flag of Panama; See also: List of Panamanian flags	
	1983–present	Flag of Saint Kitts and Nevis; See also: List of Kittitian and Nevisian flags	
	2002–present	Flag of Saint Lucia	
	1985–present	Flag of Saint Vincent and the Grenadines	
	1962–present	Flag of Trinidad and Tobago; See also: List of Trinidadian and Tobagonian flags	
	1960–present	Flag of the United States; See also: History of the flags of the United States and Flags of the U.S. states and territories	Each of the 50 stars represents a state in the Union. The 13 stripes represent the original 13 colonies that formed the United States.

== Flags of dependencies and other territories in North America ==
Flag	Date	Use	State (status)	Description
	1999–present	Flag of Anguilla	United Kingdom (overseas territory)	
	1976–present	Flag of Aruba	Netherlands (constituent country)	
	1999–present	Flag of Bermuda	United Kingdom (overseas territory)	
	1981–present	Flag of Bonaire	Netherlands (special municipality)	
	1999–present	Flag of the British Virgin Islands	United Kingdom (overseas territory)	
	1999–present	Flag of the Cayman Islands	United Kingdom (overseas territory)	
	1984–present	Flag of Curaçao	Netherlands (constituent country)	
	1985–present	Flag of Greenland	Denmark (autonomous territory)	
	1794–present	Flag of Guadeloupe	France (overseas region and department)	
	2023–present	Flag of Martinique	France (overseas region and department)	
	1999–present	Flag of Montserrat	United Kingdom (overseas territory)	
	1952–present	Flag of Puerto Rico; See also: List of Puerto Rican flags	United States (territory)	
	1794–present	Flag of Saint Barthélemy	France (overseas collectivity)	
	1794–present	Flag of Saint Martin	France (overseas collectivity)	
	1982–present	Unofficial Flag of Saint Pierre and Miquelon	France (overseas collectivity)	
	1985–present	Flag of Saba	Netherlands (special municipality)	
	2004–present	Flag of Sint Eustatius	Netherlands (special municipality)	
	1985–present	Flag of Sint Maarten	Netherlands (constituent country)	
	1999–present	Flag of the Turks and Caicos Islands	United Kingdom (overseas territory)	
	1921–present	Flag of the United States Virgin Islands	United States (unincorporated and organized territory)	

== Flags of North American cities ==
Flags of cities with over 1 million inhabitants.

Flag of Chicago, Illinois, United States

Flag of Dallas, Texas, United States

Flag of Guadalajara, Jalisco, Mexico

Flag of Guatemala City, Guatemala

Flag of Havana, Cuba

Flag of Houston, Texas, United States

Flag of León, Guanajuato, Mexico

Flag of Los Angeles, California, United States

Flag of Managua, Nicaragua

Flag of Mexico City, Mexico

Flag of Monterrey, Nuevo Leon, Mexico

Flag of Montreal, Quebec, Canada

Flag of New York, New York, United States

Flag of Philadelphia, Pennsylvania, United States

Flag of Phoenix, Arizona, United States

Flag of Puebla, Puebla, Mexico

Flag of San Antonio, Texas, United States

Flag of San Diego, California, United States

Flag of San Jose, California, United States

Flag of San Salvador, El Salvador

Flag of Tegucigalpa, Honduras

Flag of Tijuana, Baja California, Mexico

Flag of Toronto, Ontario, Canada

Flag of Zapopan, Jalisco, Mexico

== Historical flags ==
Flag	Date	Use	Description
	1967	Flag of the Republic of Anguilla	
	1967–1969	Flag of the Republic of Anguilla	
	1990–1999	Flag of Anguilla	
	1956–1962	Flag of Antigua and Barbuda	
	1962–1967	Flag of Antigua and Barbuda	
	1869–1904	Flag of The Bahamas	
	1904–1923	Flag of The Bahamas	
	1923–1953	Flag of The Bahamas	
	1953–1964	Flag of The Bahamas	
	1964–1973	Flag of The Bahamas	
	1853–1854	Flag of the Republic of Baja California	
	1870–1966	Flag of Barbados	
	1981–2019	Flag of Belize	
	1875–1910	Flag of Bermuda	
	1910–1999	Flag of Bermuda	
	1871–1956	Flag of the British Leeward Islands	
	1960–1999	Flag of the British Virgin Islands	
	1886–1903	Flag of the British Windward Islands	
	1903–1953	Flag of the British Windward Islands	
	1953–1958	Flag of the British Windward Islands	
	1837–1838	Flag of the Republic of Canada	
	1868–1921	Flag of Canada	
	1921–1957	Flag of Canada	
	1957–1965	Flag of Canada	
	1958–1999	Flag of the Cayman Islands	
	1861	Flag of the Confederate States of America	
	1861	Flag of the Confederate States of America	
	1861	Flag of the Confederate States of America	
	1861–1863	Flag of the Confederate States of America	
	1863–1865	Flag of the Confederate States of America	
	1865	Flag of the Confederate States of America	
	1902–1906; 1909–1959	Flag of Cuba	
	1955–1965	Flag of Dominica	
	1965–1978	Flag of Dominica	
	1978–1981	Flag of Dominica	
	1981–1988	Flag of Dominica	
	1988–1990	Flag of Dominica	
	1865	Flag of El Salvador	
	1865–1869	Flag of El Salvador	
	1869–1873	Flag of El Salvador	
	1873–1877	Flag of El Salvador	
	1877–1912	Flag of El Salvador	
	1875–1903	Flag of Grenada	
	1903–1967	Flag of Grenada	
	1967–1974	Flag of Grenada	
	1838–1843	Flag of Guatemala	
	1843–1851	Flag of Guatemala	
	1851–1858	Flag of Guatemala	
	1858–1871	Flag of Guatemala	
	1849–1859	Flag of Haiti	
	1859–1964	Flag of Haiti	
	1964–1986	Flag of Haiti	
	1839–1866	Flag of Honduras	
	1866–1949	Flag of Honduras	
	2022–2026	Flag of Honduras	
	1875–1906	Flag of Jamaica	
	1906–1957	Flag of Jamaica	
	1957–1962	Flag of Jamaica	
	1962	Flag of Jamaica	
	1827	Flag of the Republic of Madawaska	
	1821	Flag of the First Mexican Empire	
	1821–1823	Flag of the First Mexican Empire	
	1823–1863	Flag of Mexico	
	1864–1867	Flag of the Second Mexican Empire	
	1867–1910	Flag of Mexico	
	1910–1916	Flag of Mexico	
	1916–1968	Flag of Mexico	
	1824–1860	Flag of the Miskito Kingdom	
	1909–1960	Flag of Montserrat	
	1960–1999	Flag of Montserrat	
	1799–1803	Flag of the State of Muskogee	
	1959–1986	Flag of the Netherlands Antilles	
	1986–2010	Flag of the Netherlands Antilles	
	1895–1898	Flag of Puerto Rico	
	1952–1995	Flag of Puerto Rico	
	1840	Flag of the Republic of the Rio Grande	
	1958–1967	Flag of Saint Christopher-Nevis-Anguilla	
	1967	Flag of Saint Christopher-Nevis-Anguilla	
	1967–1983	Flag of Saint Christopher-Nevis-Anguilla	
	1875–1939	Flag of Saint Lucia	
	1939–1967	Flag of Saint Lucia	
	1967–1979	Flag of Saint Lucia	
	1979–2002	Flag of Saint Lucia	
	1877–1907	Flag of Saint Vincent and the Grenadines	
	1907–1979	Flag of Saint Vincent and the Grenadines	
	1979–1985	Flag of Saint Vincent and the Grenadines	
	1985	Flag of Saint Vincent and the Grenadines	
	1853–1854	Flag of the Republic of Sonora	
	1821–1822	Flag of the Republic of Spanish Haiti	
	1836–1839	Flag of the Republic of Texas	
	1839–1845	Flag of the Republic of Texas	
	1889–1958	Flag of Trinidad and Tobago	
	1958–1962	Flag of Trinidad and Tobago	
	1889–1968	Flag of the Turks and Caicos Islands	
	1968–1999	Flag of the Turks and Caicos Islands	
	1896–1908	Flag of the United States	
	1908–1912	Flag of the United States	
	1912–1959	Flag of the United States	
	1959–1960	Flag of the United States	
	1810	Flag of the Republic of West Florida	
	1958–1962	Flag of the West Indies Federation	
	1841–1848	Flag of the Republic of Yucatán	

== See also ==
- List of sovereign states and dependent territories in North America
- Subregions of North America

Lists of flags of North American countries

- List of Antiguan and Barbudan flags
- List of Bahamian flags
- List of Barbadian flags
- List of Belizean flags
- List of Canadian flags
- List of Costa Rican flags
- List of Cuban flags
- List of Dominican flags
- List of Dominican Republic flags
- List of Guatemalan flags
- List of Haitian flags
- List of Jamaican flags
- List of Mexican flags
- List of Nicaraguan flags
- List of Trinidadian and Tobagonian flags
- List of flags of the United States
