= Royal tours of Jamaica =

Visits to Jamaica by British royals

Since her coronation in 1953, Her Majesty visited Jamaica every decade until the early 2000s. Her Royal Tours saw her visiting Jamaica in 1953, 1966, 1975, 1983, 1994 and 2002, where she participated in Commonwealth Heads of Government Meetings, and many sittings of the Houses of Parliament on such occasions. Undoubtedly, she formed a special bond with the people of Jamaica during her reign, and her visits were met with warm welcome and an outpouring of affection.

— Prime Minister Andrew Holness, 2022

Royal tours of Jamaica by Jamaica's royal family have been taking place since the 20th century. Elizabeth II, Queen of Jamaica (r. 1962–2022), visited the island six times; in 1953, 1966, 1975, 1983, 1994, and 2002.

Other members of the royal family have also paid visits.

== 20th century ==
=== 1950s ===
External videos
- Queen Tours Jamaica (1953); Source: British Pathé.

Queen Elizabeth II's first visit to Jamaica was in November 1953. A crowd of more than 250,000 welcomed her. She and her husband drove 120 miles across the country in the sun, to meet Jamaicans from all parts of the island.

I have seen in the faces of Jamaicans how much the love of your Island home means to you. I am certain that your resolution to work for the future of your country and your children will bring added strength and new prosperity, not only to Jamaica, but to all the British West Indies.

— Princess Margaret, 1955

Princess Margaret visited Jamaica in 1955, to attend the island's Tercentenary celebrations. During the tour, the Princess opened a new hospital at Morant Bay, which was named in her honour.

=== 1960s ===
At Jamaica's independence celebrations in 1962, the Queen was represented by her sister Princess Margaret, where she opened the first session of the Parliament of Jamaica on behalf of The Queen.

The standard of Elizabeth II, Queen of Jamaica, was created in 1966.

The Queen and the Duke of Edinburgh arrived in Jamaica for a four-day visit in March 1966. They attended a civic reception in Charles Square, Montego Bay, and visited Doctor Cave Beach, Lucea Square, among other places. It was during this visit that the Queen adopted a personal Jamaican flag in her role as Jamaica's Queen, to fly on all occasions when she is present in Jamaica. The flag was used by her on subsequent visits.

The same year the Duke of Edinburgh, accompanied by elder children, Prince Charles and Princess Anne, toured Jamaica as part of his visit there to open the 1966 British Empire and Commonwealth Games in Kingston.

=== 1970s ===
The Queen and the Duke of Edinburgh visited in April 1975, coinciding with the Commonwealth Heads of Government Meeting in Kingston. Most of her visit was spent granting audiences to the Commonwealth Heads of Government. In the morning of 27 April, the Queen declared open the Norman Manley Law School, the first law school in the West Indies. The five-day royal visit came to an end on 30 April, when the Queen and the Duke left Jamaica from the Norman Manley International Airport.

=== 1980s ===
The Queen and the Duke of Edinburgh visited Jamaica from 13 to 16 February 1983, during which the Queen opened the Jamaican Parliament in the 21st anniversary year of independence.

The Queen and the Duke arrived at the Norman Manley International Airport on 13 February, and were accorded a grand welcome by a huge crowd which was descired as "one of the largest ever to turn out" for any head of state in Jamaican history. The Queen was greeted by a 21-gun salute, and she inspected an honor guard of the Jamaica Defense Force, and was welcomed by members of her Jamaican government. Many Jamaicans lined the streets in a continuous display of affection from the airport to King's House.

Jamaica and her people occupy a special place in our affections, for Prince Philip and I, and other members of our family have always received here a warmth of welcome which has only been rivalled by that of your famous sunshine. I am therefore delighted to be with you, as Queen of Jamaica to join in your celebration of twenty-one years of nationhood.

— Elizabeth II of Jamaica, 1983

On 14 February, the Queen addressed the Jamaican Parliament at a joint meeting of the Senate and the House of Representatives, and praised Jamaicans on making progress towards economic recovery. The Queen and the Duke laid a wreath at the War Memorial in National Heroes Park, Kingston. A special colourful cultural display, "Jamaica 21 Salute" was presented to the Queen at the National Stadium. The show featured Jamaica's history up to the present, before a large crowd totalling more than 25,000. In the evening, a dinner banquet was hosted by Governor-General Glasspole in the Queen's honour at King's House.

On 15 February, the Queen unveiled a plaque and planted a tree on the campus of the College of Arts, Science and Technology in Kingston, and received a warm welcome from hundreds of spectators and children from surrounding schools. The Queen opened the interim headquarters of the International Seabed Authority at Port Royal and Church streets in downtown Kingston, and later paid a flying visit to Montego Bay and were welcomed by thousands of Jamaicans. The mayor of Montego Bay, Shalman Scott, addressed the Queen, and said "The thousands of people present here today speak eloquently of our appreciation of Her Majesty's visit". The Queen and Prince Philip also toured the historic Devon House.

On 16 February, the Queen held an investiture ceremony, and later left Jamaica from the Norman Manley International Airport. The airport was decorated with the flags of the members of the then-47 Commonwealth countries, planted in the airport's fenced, well-manicured lawn.

=== 1990s ===
Anne, Princess Royal, visited in October 1990 as international patron of the University of the West Indies.

In 1994, the Queen and Prince Philip visited Jamaica from 1–3 March during a tour of the Caribbean. Preparations for the visit began early, with public buildings repainted, and public places decorated. The Queen was greeted by schoolchildren everywhere around the island. Many people, mostly women, including curious onlookers, office and factory workers, also turned out to meet them. The Queen laid a wreath at the Cenotaph in National Heroes Park in Kingston. At Sam Sharpe Square in Montego Bay, the Queen met representatives of voluntary organisations, ex-servicemen's organisations, and the media. A dinner banquet was held in King's House in the Queen's honour in the evening of 1 March, which was followed by a return dinner by the Queen the next day on HMY Britannia. The Queen visited the Laws Street Trade Training Centre, the Holy Family Primary School, a T-shirt factory in Montego Bay, the University of the West Indies. The Queen and the Duke also attended a Trooping of the Colour of the Second Battalion of the Jamaica Regiment at Up Park Camp. The Queen also visited the Jamaican Parliament, where she gave a speech which was prepared by her Jamaican Government. In her address, the Queen said that Jamaicans have built a "stable and democratic society, racial and religious tolerance, and bountiful and beautiful land". Governor-General Cooke held a Garden Party in Montego Bay, and a lunch was hosted there by Prime Minister Patterson. During the visit, Prince Philip also distributed the Duke of Edinburgh Awards to Gold Award winners.

A special 500-dollar gold coin was struck to mark the royal visit, and it was presented to the Queen by the Government and People of Jamaica.

== 21st century ==
=== 2000s ===
Charles, Prince of Wales visited in 2000. He visited Trench Town, where he was greeted by the widow of Bob Marley, Rita Marley. A crowd of more than 2,000 people turned out to see him.

The warmth of the people of Jamaica has always been much in evidence during our visits here. It is the same generosity of the Jamaican spirit which provides you as Parliament and Government with the energy and the will to serve and to lead.

— Elizabeth II of Jamaica, 2002

The Queen's first official engagements related to her Golden Jubilee took place in Jamaica. Her tour of the island also coincided with the country's 40th anniversary of independence. She and the Duke of Edinburgh arrived for the celebrations on 18 February 2002. The Queen was first welcomed in Montego Bay, after which she travelled to Kingston and stayed at her Jamaican prime minister's residence, Jamaica House.

The Queen and the Duke of Edinburgh were "enthusiastically welcomed" by Jamaicans; 57% of those polled said the visit was important to the country and large crowds turned out to see her. The Queen received an official welcome at King's House, the Governor-General's residence, met with Jamaican veterans of the First World War, addressed her Jamaican parliament, and visited an underprivileged area of Kingston, known as Trenchtown, viewing urban poverty projects while there. The tour ended on a unique note when, at the final banquet in Jamaica, a power outage plunged King's House into darkness during the meal; the Queen described the event as "memorable".

External videos
- The Queen visits Jamaica, 2002; Source: The Royal Family
- The Queen's Golden Jubilee Address to the Jamaican Parliament (2002); Source: C-SPAN

In 2003, Prince Edward, Earl of Wessex visited Jamaica.

Anne, Princess Royal visited Jamaica for a three-day visit in 2005, for the 50th anniversary rededication and celebrations of the Princess Margaret Hospital. The Princess also visited parts of Spanish Town, and Kingston.

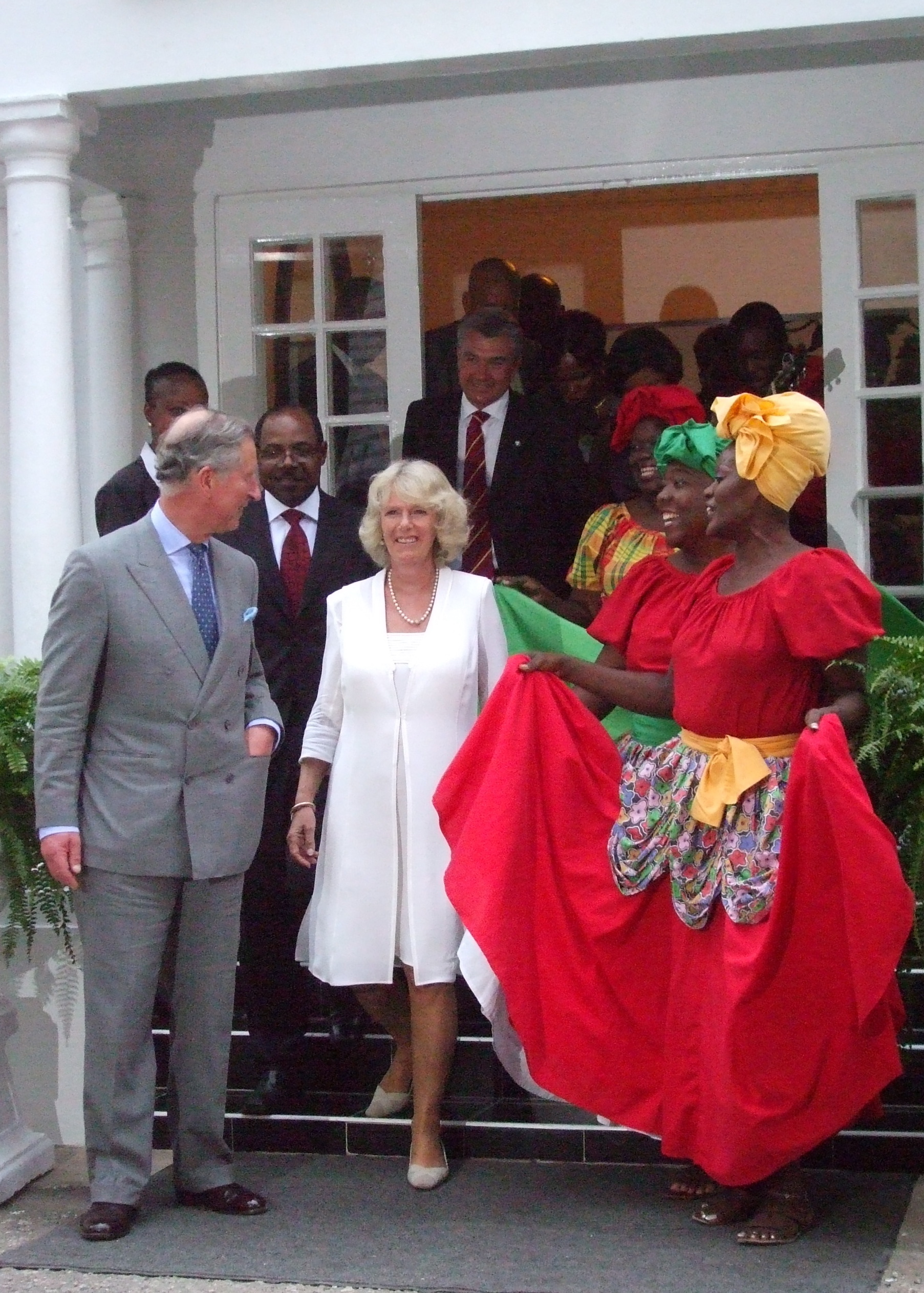
Charles, Prince of Wales and Camilla, Duchess of Cornwall in Jamaica, March 2008

The Prince of Wales and Duchess of Cornwall, visited in March 2008. They were welcomed by Governor-General Kenneth Hall and the Prince also inspected an honor guard in Kingston. The Prince planted a seedling at a community center in Rose Town, and visited a museum honoring the late singer Bob Marley.

=== 2010s ===
Anne, Princess Royal, visited Jamaica in 2011 during an official visit from 5–6 June.

External videos
- Prince Harry in Jamaica; Source: Jamaica Gleaner.

Prince Harry toured Jamaica between 5 and 8 March 2012, participating in various events marking the Queen's Diamond Jubilee. Jamaica concurrently celebrated its 50 years of independence. During the tour, the Prince partook in military exercises with the Jamaica Defence Force, visited Bustamante Hospital for Children and, in Trelawny Parish, visited Water Square, Falmouth Pier, and the William Knibb Baptist Church, where he paid respect at the William Knibb memorial. The Prince attended an event for the charity Rise Life, ran with Usain Bolt at the latter's training ground at the University of the West Indies, Mona. There, he was also named an Honorary Fellow of the university. A Jamaica Night reception was held at the Royal Caribbean Hotel in Montego Bay and Governor-General of Jamaica Sir Patrick Allen hosted a dinner at King's House, as a combined celebration of the Diamond Jubilee and Jamaica's 50th anniversary of independence. The Prime Minister, Portia Simpson Miller, stated the tour was intended to "highlight the country's tourism developments on the North Coast and the important work being done in the area of youth and children".

It just leaves me, therefore, to say on behalf of The Queen how grateful Her Majesty is for the heartfelt way in which Jamaicans have embraced her Diamond Jubilee and are helping her to celebrate it.

— Prince Henry of Wales, 2012

Prince Michael of Kent visited in 2013 from 15 to 19 April, at the invitation of the National Road Safety Council (NRSC), to celebrate its 20th anniversary. The Prince also toured the Sir John Golding Rehabilitation Centre in Mona and the Mona GeoInformatics Institute at the University of the West Indies.

In 2014, the Earl and Countess of Wessex arrived for a four-day visit from 2–5 March. They visited the UWI Sports Medicine Facility, the University of Technology (UTech), the Bustamante Hospital for Children, the Bustamante Museum, the Jamaica Defence Force Headquarters, Genesis Academy, Holy Family Primary and Infant Schools and the Portmore HEART Academy. They also participated in activities related to the Duke of Edinburgh Awards in Jamaica.

The Princess Royal returned in 2015 for a three-day visit from 30 September to 2 October, for the closing ceremony of the Caribbean-Canada Emerging Leaders Dialogue (CCELD). In her address at the closing ceremony of the CCELD, the Princess said she was "wonderfully entertained with that real flavor of Jamaica" during her visit. The Princess toured the Mico College University, Jamaica Defence Force (JDF) headquarters at Up Park Camp, and the RJR Communications Group, where she interacted with children of the RJR Basic School. She also participated in the Duke of Edinburgh Medal Awards.

=== 2020s ===
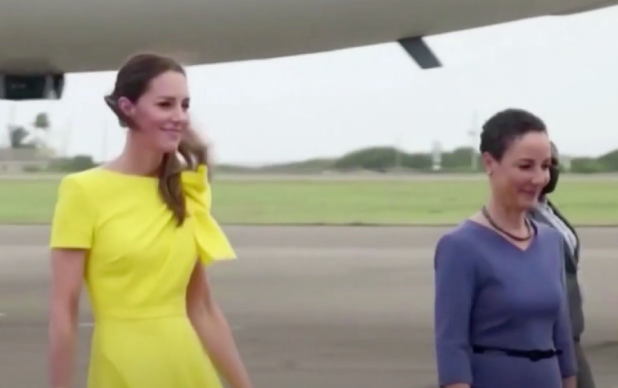
The Duchess of Cambridge (left) arriving at Norman Manley International Airport in Kingston, during the Platinum Jubilee Tour of Jamaica

In 2022, the Duke and Duchess of Cambridge visited Jamaica from 22 to 24 March during a Caribbean tour to mark the Queen's Platinum Jubilee. The couple landed at the Norman Manley International Airport in Kingston on 22 March, where the Duke was given a guard of honour. They then headed to King's House, where the Duke and Duchess met the Governor-General Sir Patrick Allen and his wife Patricia. Later in Trench Town, they joined young football players on a local football pitch. At the Trench Town Culture Yard Museum, where Bob Marley used to live, they couple learnt about Jamaica's contributions to music and attended a celebration of reggae music.

I'm particularly pleased tonight to convey the very best wishes from my grandmother, The Queen of Jamaica, on the occasion of her Platinum Jubilee. It is no secret that The Queen has a deep affection for Jamaica, forged on her very first visit here with my grandfather, The Duke of Edinburgh, in 1953. And likewise, I have been touched to hear today from Jamaicans, young and old, about their affection for The Queen. Her dedication, commitment, and sense of duty to the Commonwealth family is deeply admired. She may be my actual grandmother, but every one counts her as their grandmother too. And I'm okay with that!

— The Duke of Cambridge, 2022

On 23 March, the Duke and Duchess met the Jamaican Prime Minister Andrew Holness and his wife Juliet. During their meeting, Holness stated that Jamaica was "moving on and we intend to attain in short order our development goals and fulfil our true ambitions and destiny as an independent, developed, prosperous country". A demonstration by the Advocates Network, a human rights coalition of Jamaican activists and equalities organisations, took place near the British High Commission in Kingston to ask for an apology and compensation from the Crown for chattel slavery.

At the Shortwood Teacher's College, the couple met students who are training to become early childhood education practitioners. Later, the Duke and Duchess visited Spanish Town Hospital where they met frontline workers who have been working in response to COVID-19 in Jamaica. At Flankers, near Montego Bay, the couple met members of the Jamaica Defence Force. In the evening, the Duke and Duchess attended a dinner hosted by the Governor-General of Jamaica at King's House. In his speech, the Duke expressed his "profound sorrow" over slavery, adding that it "should never have happened" and "forever stains our history".

The next day, on 24 March, the couple attended the inaugural Commissioning Parade for service personnel from across the Caribbean who had recently completed the Caribbean Military Academy's Officer Training Programme. The Duke and Duchess later departed from the Norman Manley International Airport for the Bahamas. On their departure, the Duchess wore a hummingbird brooch that was gifted to the Queen of Jamaica during her Golden Jubilee tour of the country in 2002.
