= Belize at the 2022 World Athletics Championships =

- Flag of Belize
- WA code: BIZ
- National federation: Belize Athletic Association

in Eugene, United States 15–24 July 2022
- Competitors: 1 (1 man)
- Medals: Gold 0 Silver 0 Bronze 0 Total 0

World Athletics Championships appearances
- 1983; 1987; 1991; 1993; 1995; 1997; 1999; 2001; 2003; 2005; 2007; 2009; 2011; 2013; 2015; 2017; 2019; 2022; 2023; 2025

Belize competed at the 2022 World Athletics Championships in Eugene, Oregon, United States, which were held from 15 to 24 July 2022. The athlete delegation of the country was composed of one competitor, sprinter Shaun Gill. He competed in the men's 100 metres, advancing from the preliminaries up to the qualifying heats where he was eliminated.

== Background ==
The 2022 World Athletics Championships in Eugene, Oregon, United States, were held from 15 to 24 July 2022. To qualify for the World Championships, athletes had to reach an entry standard (e.g. time and distance), place in a specific position at select competitions, be a wild card entry, or qualify through their World Athletics Ranking at the end of the qualification period.

As Belize did not meet any of the four standards, they could send either one male or one female athlete in one event of the Championships who has not yet qualified. The Belize Athletic Association selected sprinter Shaun Gill who held a personal best and season's best of 10.57 seconds in the men's 100 metres, his entered event. This was Gill's first time representing Belize at the World Championships

== Results ==
Gill first competed in the preliminaries of the men's 100 metres on 15 July in the first heat against six other competitors. There, he recorded a time of 10.76 seconds and placed fourth, advancing further as he was within the next six fastest competitors outside of the top two of their respective rounds. He then competed in the qualifying heats on the same day in the third heat against seven other competitors. There, he recorded a time of 10.77 seconds and placed last, failing to advance further as only the top three of each heat and the next three fastest athletes would only be able to do so.

Track and road events

Athlete	Event	Preliminary		Heat		Semi-final		Final	
Athlete	Event	Result	Rank	Result	Rank	Result	Rank	Result	Rank
Shaun Gill	Men's 100 metres	10.76 q	13	10.77	53	did not advance			
