= Coat of arms of Havana =

Armoral bearings

- Armiger: Havana
- Adopted: 1638
- Use: Municipality of Havana

The coat of arms of Havana, Cuba, consist of three castles that represent the three first main castles which defended the city—namely, the Fuerza Castle, the Morro Castle and the Punta Castle.

== Description ==
The key represents that Havana was the gateway to the New World of Spanish America. The shield is supported by an oak branch on one side and a laurel wreath on the other. The oak branch symbolizes the strength of the nation; and the laurel wreath: honour and glory. These symbols were meant to represent the rights of man: Equality, Liberty and Fraternity.

== Gallery ==
A version of the Colonial Coat of Arms of Havana

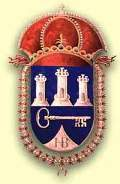
Version that appears in a document dated May 20, 1666.

Emblem of the Real Maestranza de caballería of Havana, established in 1709, was entrusted under the patronage of the Immaculate Conception.

== See also ==
- Coat of arms of Cuba
- Flag of Cuba
