= Belize at the 1983 World Championships in Athletics =

- Flag of Belize
- WA code: BIZ

in Helsinki, Finland August 7–14, 1983
- Competitors: 2 (1 man and 1 woman) in 4 events
- Medals: Gold 0 Silver 0 Bronze 0 Total 0

World Championships in Athletics appearances
- 1983; 1987; 1991; 1993; 1995; 1997; 1999; 2001; 2003; 2005; 2007; 2009; 2011; 2013; 2015; 2017; 2019; 2022; 2023; 2025

Belize competed at the 1983 World Championships in Athletics in Helsinki, Finland, which were held from 7 to 14 August 1983. The athlete delegation consisted of two athletes, sprinter and middle-distance runner Clive Williams and sprinter Marjorie Gentle. Both of the athletes competed in two events but failed to advance past the qualifying heats of their events.

== Background ==
The 1983 World Championships in Athletics were held at the Helsinki Olympic Stadium in Helsinki, Finland. Under the auspices of the International Amateur Athletics Federation, this was the first edition of the World Championships. It was held from 7 to 14 August 1983 and had 41 different events. Among the competing teams was the nation of Belize. For this edition of the World Championships in Athletics, sprinter and middle-distance runner Clive Williams and sprinter Marjorie Gentle competed.

== Men ==
For the men's 400 metres, Williams competed in the qualifying heats of the event on 7 August in the seventh heat against six other competitors. There, he recorded a time of 51.82 seconds and placed sixth, failing to advance further as only the top three athletes in each heat and the next eleven fastest athletes would be able to. The qualifying heats of the men's 800 metres were held on the same day and Williams competed in the eighth heat against seven other competitors. There, he recorded a time of 2:03.64 and placed last, failing to advance to the semifinals as only the top two of each heat and the eight next fastest would be able to.

Track and road events

Athlete	Event	Heat		Quarterfinal		Semifinal		Final	
Athlete	Event	Result	Rank	Result	Rank	Result	Rank	Result	Rank
Clive Williams	400 metres	51.82	6	Did not advance					
Clive Williams	800 metres	2:03.64	8	—N/a		Did not advance			

== Women ==
Gentle first competed in the qualifying heats of the women's 400 metres on 7 August in the first heat against six other competitors. There, she recorded a time of 1:04.00 and failed to advance further, being the only one to do so. She then competed in the qualifying heats of the women's 200 metres five days later in the first heat against six other competitors. There, she recorded a time of 27.90 seconds and placed sixth, failing to advance further as only the top four of each heat and the next eight fastest athletes would be able to do so.

Track and road events

Athlete	Event	Heat		Quarterfinal		Semifinal		Final	
Athlete	Event	Result	Rank	Result	Rank	Result	Rank	Result	Rank
Marjorie Gentle	200 metres	27.90	39	Did not advance					
Marjorie Gentle	400 metres	1:04.00	33	Did not advance					
