= Belize at the 2023 World Athletics Championships =

- Flag of Belize
- WA code: BIZ

in Budapest, Hungary 19 August 2023 – 27 August 2023
- Competitors: 1 (1 man and 0 women)
- Medals: Gold 0 Silver 0 Bronze 0 Total 0

World Athletics Championships appearances
- 1983; 1987; 1991; 1993; 1995; 1997; 1999; 2001; 2003; 2005; 2007; 2009; 2011; 2013; 2015; 2017; 2019; 2022; 2023; 2025

Belize competed at the 2023 World Athletics Championships in Budapest, Hungary, which were held from 19 to 27 August 2023. The athlete delegation of the country was composed of one competitor, sprinter Brandon Jones who would compete in the men's 100 metres. He qualified for the Championships after his rank was high enough in the World Athletics Rankings. In the preliminaries, he placed second in his heat and qualified for the heats. He was then eliminated after placing seventh out of the eight people in the heat.

== Background ==
The 2023 World Athletics Championships in Budapest, Hungary, were held from 19 to 27 August 2023. The Championships were held at the National Athletics Centre. To qualify for the World Championships, athletes had to reach an entry standard (e.g. time or distance), place in a specific position at select competitions, be a wild card entry, or qualify through their World Athletics Ranking at the end of the qualification period.

Sprinter Brandon Jones would be the sole representative for the nation at the championships. He qualified after he ranked high enough in the World Athletics Rankings for the men's 100 metres. This was Jones' second appearance for Belize at the World Athletics Championships.

== Results ==
Key

- Q = Qualified for the next round
- q = Qualified for the next round as a fastest loser or, in field events, by position without achieving the qualifying target
- NR = National record
- PB = Personal best
- SB = Season best
- N/A = Round not applicable for the event

=== Men ===
Jones competed in the preliminary round of the men's 100 metres on 19 August against six other competitors in his heat. He raced in the second preliminary round and recorded a time of 10.94 seconds. There, he placed second and qualified for the heats. For the heats held on the same day, he raced in the fifth heat and recorded a time of 10.95 seconds. He placed seventh out of the eight athletes in his heat, placing over Favour Ashe who had been disqualified, and did not qualify for the semifinals. After he competed at the Championships, he was due to attend a dinner hosted by the Minister of Youth, Sports, and Transport Rodwell Ferguson to celebrate athletes who have represented Belize in international competition.

Track and road events

| Athlete | Event | Preliminary | | Heat | | Semifinal | | Final | |
| Athlete | Event | Result | Rank | Result | Rank | Result | Rank | Result | Rank |
|---|---|---|---|---|---|---|---|---|---|
| Brandon Jones | 100 metres | 10.94 | 2 Q | 10.95 | 7 | Did not advance | | | |
