= List of Cuban flags =

== National flag ==
Flag	Date	Use	Description
	1906–present	Flag of Cuba	Five horizontal stripes, three of indigo blue alternate with two white, with a red equilateral triangle based on the hoist side bearing a white five-pointed star in the center.
	1902–1906	Flag of Cuba (sky blue variant)	Sky blue variant used by the Republic of Cuba from 1902 to 1906. The blue was officially changed to a dark indigo as outlined by the Presidential Decree 24/04/1906.

== Governmental flags ==
Flag	Date	Use	Description
	1959–present	Flag of the president of Cuba	
	1959–present	Flag of the president of Cuba (Commander-in-Chief)	
	1929–1959	Flag of the president of Cuba	
	1909–1929	Flag of the president of Cuba	
	1909–1929	Flag of the president of Cuba (afloat)	

== Military flags ==
=== Naval flags ===
Flag	Date	Use	Description
		Flag of Commander of the Cuban Revolutionary Navy	
		Flag of Deputy Chief of the Revolutionary Navy of Cuba	
		Flag of Naval Base Commander	
		Flag of Squadron Commander	
		Masthead pennant	
		Naval jack	

=== Rank flags ===
Flag	Date	Use	Description
		Flag of the first vice minister	
		Flag of the Minister of the Cuban Revolutionary Armed Forces	
		Flag of the vice minister, Chief of General Staff	
		Flag of the Chief of Army	
		Flag of the president of Cuba (Commander-in-Chief)	

== Local flags ==
=== Flags of municipalities ===
Flag	Date	Use	Description
		Flag of the city of Havana	
		Flag of Quivicán	
		Flag of Santa Clara	
		Flag of Cienfuegos	
		Flag of Cumanayagua	
		Flag of Bayamo and Yara	
		Flag of Jagüey Grande	
Link to file		Flag of Ciénaga de Zapata	
		Flag of Cruces	
Link to file		Flag of Ranchuelo	
		Flag of Guanabacoa	
Link to file		Flag of Caimito	
		Flag of Trinidad	
Link to file		Flag of Santiago de Cuba	

=== Historical local flags ===
Flag	Date	Use	Description
	1976–2010	Flag of La Habana Province (1976–2010)	
	1845	Flag of Trinidad Maritime Province	
	1845	Flag of La Habana Maritime Province	
	1845	Flag of San Juan de los Remedios Maritime Province	
	1845	Flag of Santiago de Cuba Maritime Province	
	1845	Flag of Nuevitas Maritime Province	
	1885	Flag of Cienfuegos Maritime Province	
	1885	Flag of Sagua La Grande Maritime Province	

== Historical flags ==
Flag	Date	Use	Description
	1521–1843	Flag of Cross of Burgundy	
	1810	Flag of Joaquín Infante, one of the earliest Cuban independence movements	
	1823	Flag of the sun of Bolivar, the first planned flag used for the plans for a Bolivarian Cuba	
	1823	Flag of the suns of Bolivar, The first flag used during the conspiracy for a Bolivarian Cuba	
	1823	Flag of the suns of Bolivar, The second flag used during the conspiracy for a Bolivarian Cuba	
	1895	Unofficial cuban autonomist flag in 1895 utilized by Jesús Rabí	
	1843–1873; 1874–1898	Flag of Spanish America	
	1873–1874	Flag of First Spanish Republic	
	1847–1848	The flag of the Conspiracy of the Cuban Rose Mine, an annexationist movement led by Narcisco Lopez between 1847 and 1848	
	1847	Flag of the Havana Club Movement, a U.S. annexationist movement of Cuba in 1847	
	1868–1878	Céspedes flag of the Ten Years' War	
		Flag of the Revolutionary Directorate	
		Flag of the Revolutionary Directorate of 13 March	
	1953-1962	Party flag of the Movimiento 26 de Julio	
		Naval jack of Cuba, also known as the flag of Yara or the flag of La Demajagua	
	1959–1976	Standard of the prime minister of Cuba	
	1898–1902; 1906–1908	Flag of the Military Government of Cuba	
	1908–1909	Flag of the Provisional Government of Cuba	
	1960	The flag of Brigade 2506; a CIA-sponsored group of Cuban exiles formed in 1960 to attempt the military overthrow of the Cuban government headed by Fidel Castro.	
	1933	Flag of the Cuban Revolution of 1933	

== Political flags ==
Flag	Date	Party	Description
	1965–present	Communist Party of Cuba	
	1965–present	Young Communist League, youth organization of the Communist Party of Cuba	
	1925–1961	Popular Socialist Party	
	1961–present	Alpha 66	
	1962–1970's	Movimiento Nacionalista Cristiano, a Falangist organization made by Cuban exiles	
	1962–1989	The Movimiento Nacionalista Cubano, a Cuban exile Third Positionist organization that conducted several assassinations and bombings	
	1931–1952	ABC	
	2003–present	La Falange Cubana^{es}	
	2017–present	The Cuban Libertarian Party	
		Pioneers Organization "Jose Martí"	
	1930–present	Organisation Autentica	

== House flags ==
Flag	Date	Use	Description
	1916–1956	Flag of the Cuban Shipping Company^{es}	

== See also ==
- Coat of arms of Cuba
- La Bayamesa
