= Dominican flag =

Dominican Flag may refer to:

- Flag of the Dominican Republic
  - List of Dominican Republic flags
- Flag of Dominica
