= List of Kittitian and Nevisian flags =

Historical flags of Saint Kitts and Nevis

== National ==
Flag	Duration	Use	Description
	1983–present	Flag of Saint Kitts and Nevis	A yellow-edged black diagonal band bearing two white five-pointed stars reaching from the lower hoist-side corner to the upper fly-side corner: the upper triangle is green and the lower triangle is red.
	1967–1983	Flag of Saint Christopher-Nevis-Anguilla	A vertical tricolour of green, yellow, and blue charged with a palm tree at the centre.
	1967	Flag of Saint Christopher-Nevis-Anguilla	A vertical tricolour of green, yellow, and blue.
	1958–1967	Flag of Saint Christopher-Nevis-Anguilla	A blue ensign with the emblem of the territory in the fly.
	1958–1962	Flag of the West Indies Federation	A blue field with four white horizontal wavy bars (the top pair of bars being parallel and the lower pair also parallel) and an orange sun in the centre.
	1871–1956	Flag of the British Leeward Islands	A blue ensign with the emblem of the territory in the fly.

== Subnational ==
Flag	Duration	Use	Description
	?–present	Flag of Nevis	The flag incorporates the national flag in the top hoist corner.

== Government ==
Flag	Duration	Use	Description
	1983–present	Flag of the governor-general of Saint Kitts and Nevis	A lion statant guardant surmounted upon St Edward's Crown above a gold scroll inscribed with 'COUNTRY ABOVE SELF' on a blue field.
	1980–1983	Flag of the governor-general of Saint Christopher and Nevis	A lion statant guardant surmounted upon St Edward's Crown above a gold scroll inscribed with 'SAINT CHRISTOPHER AND NEVIS' on a blue field.
	1967–1980	Flag of the governor-general of Saint Christopher-Nevis-Anguilla	A lion statant guardant surmounted upon St Edward's Crown above a gold scroll inscribed with 'St. CHRISTOPHER NEVIS ANGUILLA' on a blue field.
	1958–1962	Flag of the governor-general of the West Indies Federation	A lion statant guardant surmounted upon St Edward's Crown above a gold scroll inscribed with 'THE WEST INDIES' on a blue field.
	1958–1967	Flag of the governor of Saint Christopher-Nevis-Anguilla	A Union Jack defaced with the badge of the territory.

== Military ==
Flag	Duration	Use	Description
		Naval ensign of Saint Kitts and Nevis	A white field with a centered red cross, the national flag stretched out to a ratio of 1:2 is in the canton.
	1958–1962	Naval ensign of the West Indies Federation	A white field with a centered red cross, the national flag stretched out to a ratio of 1:2 is in the canton.

== See also ==
- Flag of Saint Kitts and Nevis
- Coat of arms of Saint Kitts and Nevis
- O Land of Beauty!
