= List of Belizean flags =

The following is a list of flags used in Belize. For more information about the national flag, see the Flag of Belize.

== National flag ==
Flag	Date	Use	Description
	2019–present	Flag of Belize	A royal blue field with two red narrow horizontal stripes along the top and bottom edges and a large white disk in the centre bearing the national coat of arms.

== Government flag ==
Flag	Date	Use	Description
	1981–present	Flag of the governor-general of Belize	

== Armed forces flag ==
Flag	Date	Use	Description
Link to file		Flag of the Belize Defence Force	

== Ethnic group flags ==
Flag	Date	Use	Description
	?–present	Flag of Mayan people	
	?–present	Flag of the Garifuna people	

== City flags ==
Flag	Date	Use	Description
	?–present	Flag of Belize City	
	?–present	Flag of Belmopan	
	?–present	Flag of San Ignacio	
	?–present	Flag of Sarteneja	

== Historical flags ==
Flag	Date	Use	Description
	1524–1785	Flag of Spain	A red saltire resembling two crossed, roughly-pruned (knotted) branches, on a white field.
	1665–1700	Flag of England	A white field with centred red cross.
	1785–1821	Flag of Spain	Three horizontal stripes: red, yellow (double width), and red, with the coat of arms offset from the centre towards the hoist.
	1821–1823	Flag of the First Mexican Empire	Three vertical stripes: green, white, and red, with the Imperial coat of arms in the centre.
	1823–1824	Flag of the United Provinces of Central America / Federal Republic of Central America	Three horizontal stripes: light blue (upper and lower) and white (central), with the coat of arms in the center.
	1824–1836	Flag of the United Provinces of Central America / Federal Republic of Central America	Similar to the previous flag.
	1825–1836	Flag of Guatemala within Central America	Three horizontal stripes: blue (upper and lower) and white (central).
	1841–1848	Flag of the Republic of Yucatán	Tricolor of red (upper), white, and red with a green vertical band on the hoist side containing five white stars.
	1836–1870	Flag of the United Kingdom	A superimposition of the flags of England and Scotland with the Saint Patrick's Saltire (representing Ireland).
	1870–1919	Flag of the British Honduras (Blue Ensign)	A Blue Ensign with the arms of British Honduras.
	1870–1919	Flag of the British Honduras (Red Ensign)	A Red Ensign with the arms of British Honduras.
	1884–1981	Former flag of the governor-general of British Honduras/Belize	A Union Jack defaced with the arms of British Honduras.
	1919–1981	Flag of the British Honduras (Blue Ensign)	A Blue Ensign with the arms of British Honduras.
	1919–1981	Flag of the British Honduras (Red Ensign)	A Red Ensign with the arms of British Honduras.
	1950–1981	First flag of Belize	Blue field with a large white disk in the centre bearing the national coat of arms.
	1981–2019	Second flag of Belize	Similar to the present flag.

== Political flags ==
Flag	Date	Party	Description
	1950–present	People's United Party	
	1973–present	United Democratic Party	
Link to file	2013–present	Belize People's Front	
Link to file	2015–present	Belize Progressive Party	

== See also ==
- Flag of Belize
- Coat of arms of Belize
