= List of Mexican flags =

The following is a list of flags that are used in the United Mexican States and its predecessor states.

== National flag ==
Flag	Date	Use	Description
	1821	Officially decreed by Agustín de Iturbide in November 1821.	
			Variant
	1821–1823		
			Variant
	1823–1864; 1867–1893		
	1823–1824		
	1824–1835		
	1835–1846		
	1846–1863		
	1864–1867		
	1880–1893		
	1893–1916		
	1910	Independence centennial. Ordered by President Porfirio Díaz.	
	1910–1911		
	1916–1934		
			Variant
	1934–1968		
			Variant
		Official	
	1968–present	Civil use	Variant
	1968–present		A vertical tricolor of green, white, and red with the national coat of arms centered on the white band.

== Government ==
Flag	Date	Use	Description
	Unknown–present	Presidential standard	
	Unknown–present	Presidential standard at sea	
	Unknown–present	Presidential standard (as supreme commander)	
		Judiciary flag of the Supreme Court	

=== Historical ===
Flag	Date	Use	Description
	1521–1701	Cross of Burgundy military flag of Spain used as banner of its overseas territory	
	1521–1821	Cross of Burgundy flag used in New Spain	
	1701–1760	Flag of the Spanish Empire	
	1760–1785	Flag of the Spanish Empire	
	1785–1821	Flag used by the Spanish Empire in its territories	
	1810	Banner used by Miguel Hidalgo y Costilla	
	1811–1812	Flag used by Regimiento de la muerte (Death Regiment) after Hidalgo's death in the Independence War	
	1812	Flag used by José María Morelos at the Independence War	
	1815	Insurgents war flag	

== State flags ==
Baja California Sur

Durango

Guanajuato

Guerrero

Jalisco

Querétaro

Quintana Roo

Tlaxcala

Yucatán

== Municipality flags ==
Atotonilco el Alto

Benito Juárez

Cozumel

Guadalajara

Ixtlahuacán de los Membrillos

León de Los Aldama

Monterrey

Morelia

Santiago Matatlán

Tlaquepaque

Toluca

Tonaya

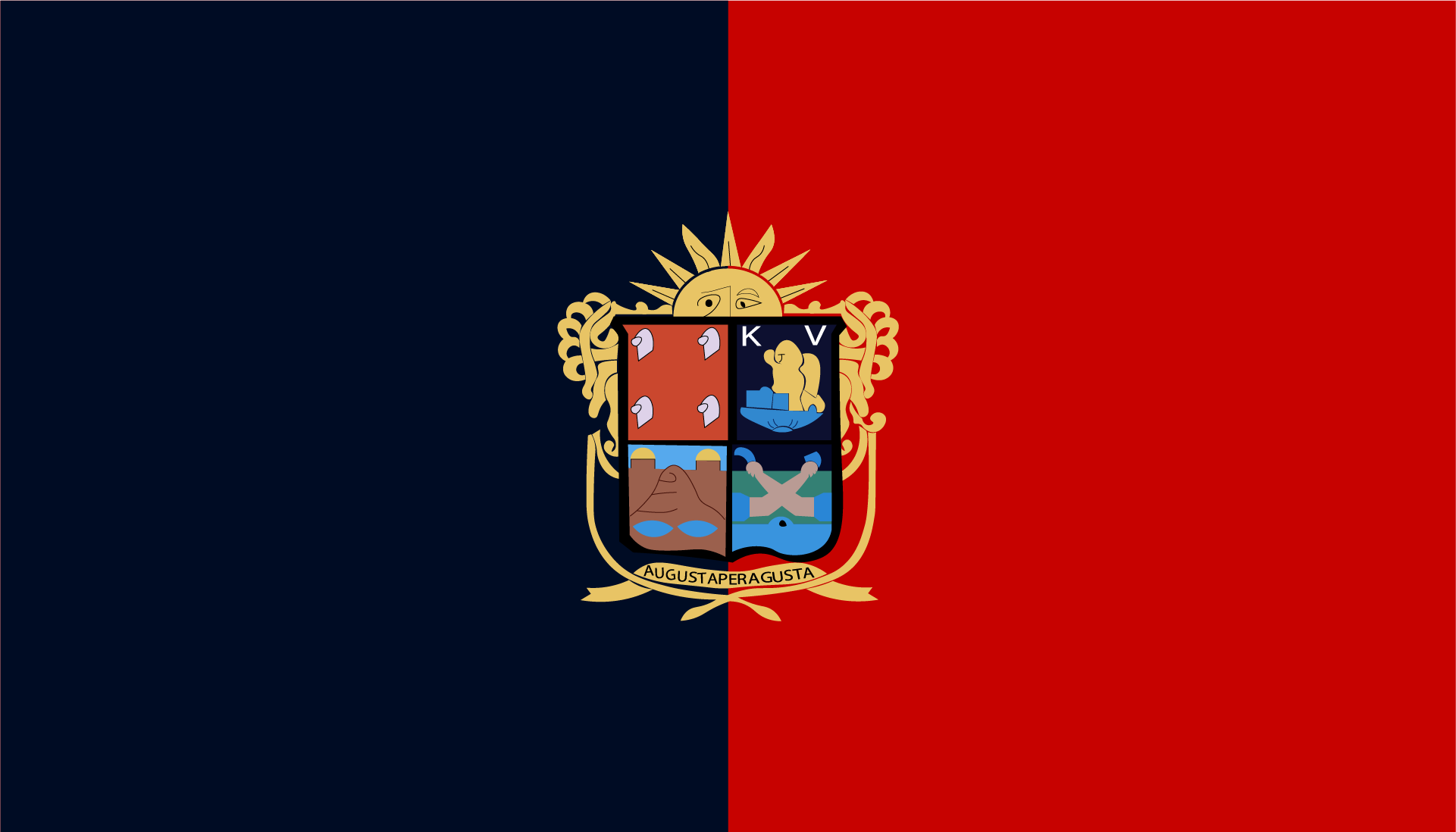
Irapuato

== Military flags ==
Naval Jack

Naval Infantry Corps

Mexican Army

Mexican Air Force

Three Guarantees army flag (1820–1821)

Iturbide's infantry (1821)

Flag used by Mexican Royalists in 1808

Mexican Insurgents (naval) used in 1815

Mexican Insurgents (parliamentary) used in 1815

Mexican Insurgents (commercial) used in 1815

== Annexation ==
Republic of Yucatán

Republic of the Rio Grande

Republic of Sonora

Province of Chiapas (then part of the Federal Republic of Central America)

== Political flags ==
Flag	Date	Use	Description
Current
	2006–present	Nationalist Front of Mexico	
	1937–present	National Synarchist Union	
		Coalition of Workers, Peasants, and Students of the Isthmus	
Former
	1905–1918	Mexican Liberal Party	
Other
	1994–present	Zapatista Army of National Liberation	
	1996–present	Popular Revolutionary Army	
	2009–2014	Práxedis G. Guerrero Autonomous Cells of Immediate Revolution	
	1931–1935	Red Shirts	
	1933–1936	Revolutionary Mexicanist Action	The flag depicts a shield (chīmalli) with fringes crossed by a macana (macuahuitl). Four crescents and cotton (ichcatl) representing agriculture.
	1926–1929	Flag used by the Cristeros during the Cristero War	

== Native American flags ==
Flag	Date	Use	Description
		Yucatec Maya people	
		Otomi people	
		Pima people	
		Rarámuri people	
		Seri people	
		Yaqui people	
		Tzotzil people	
		Zapotec peoples	

== Criminal cartel flags ==
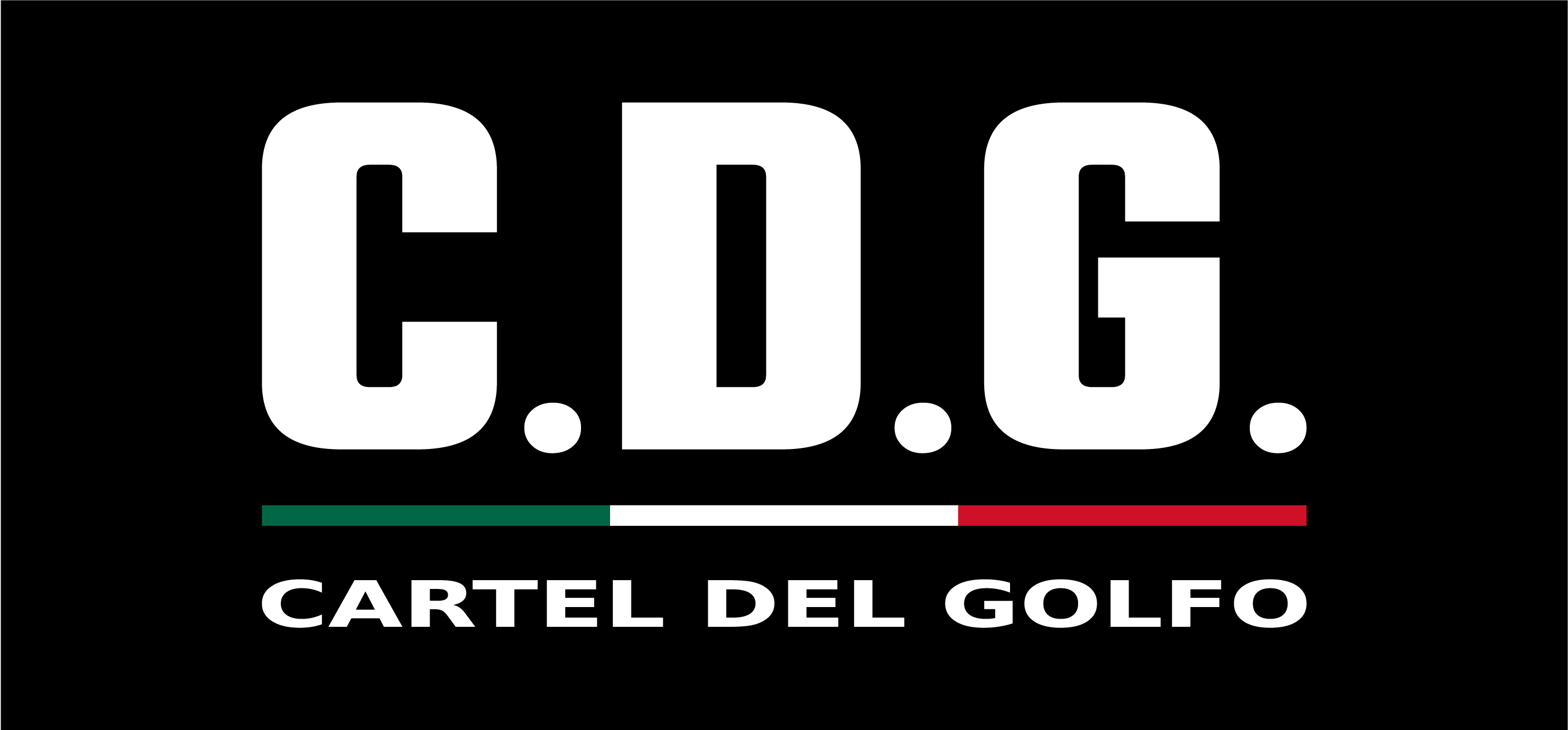
Gulf Cartel

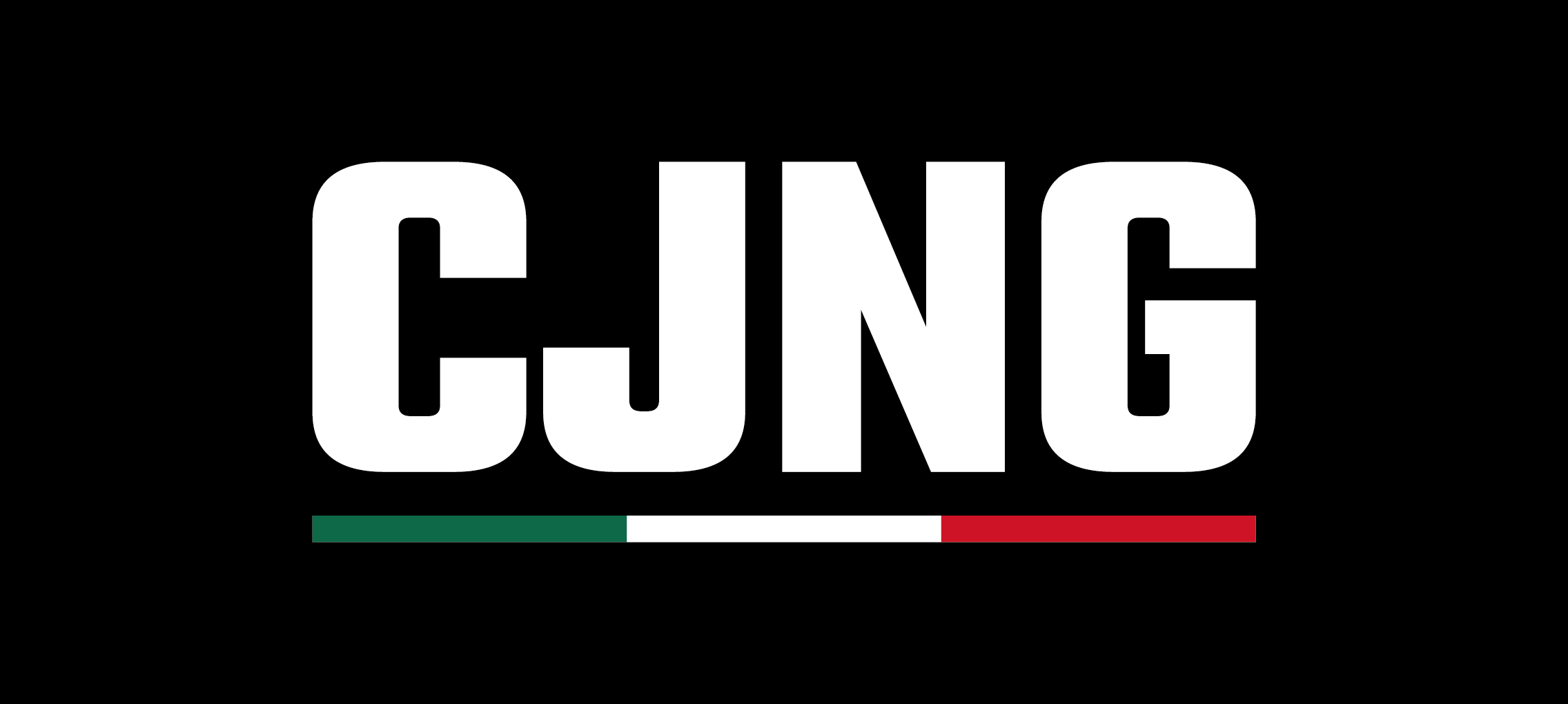
Jalisco New Generation Cartel

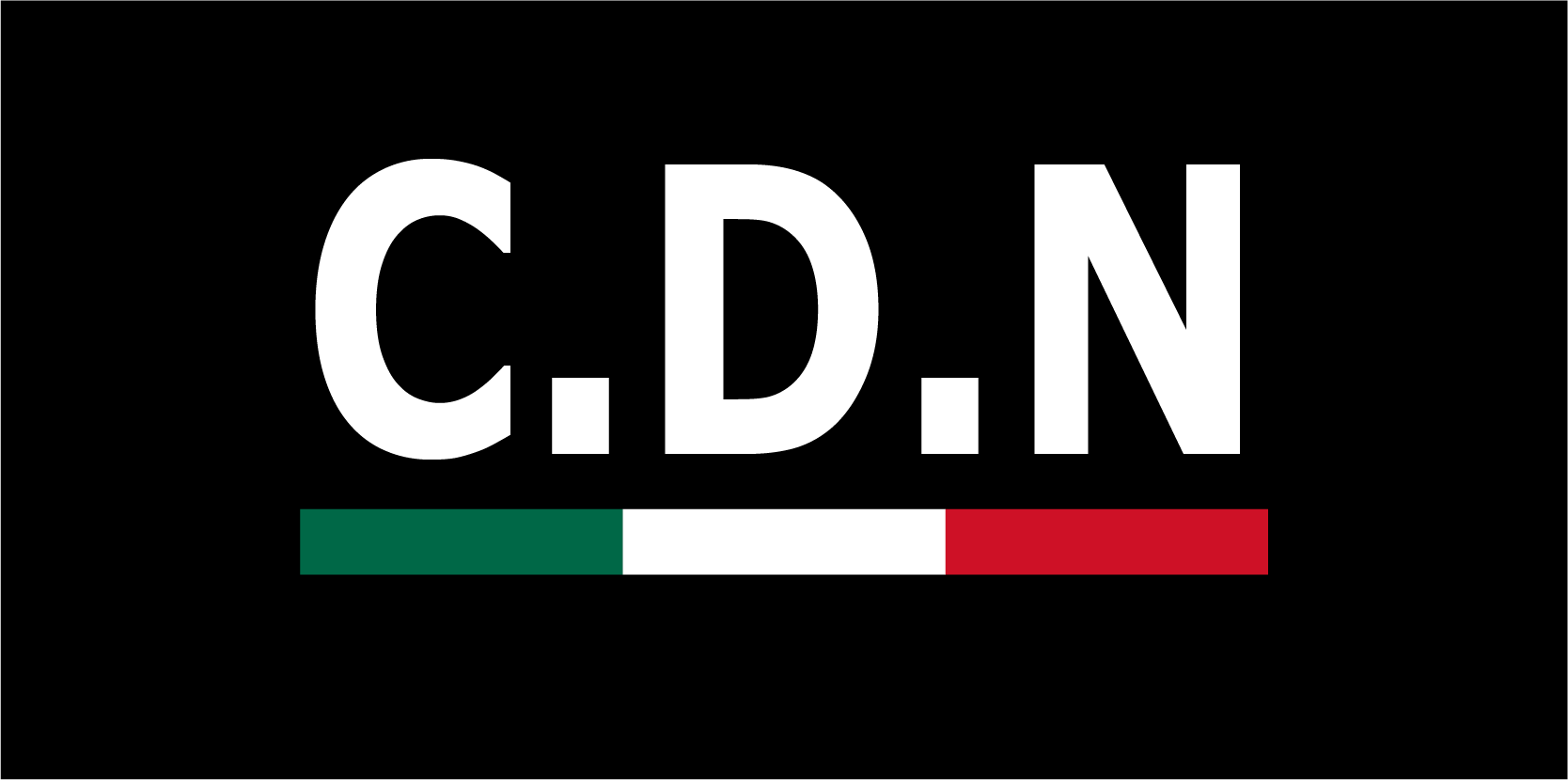
Northeast Cartel

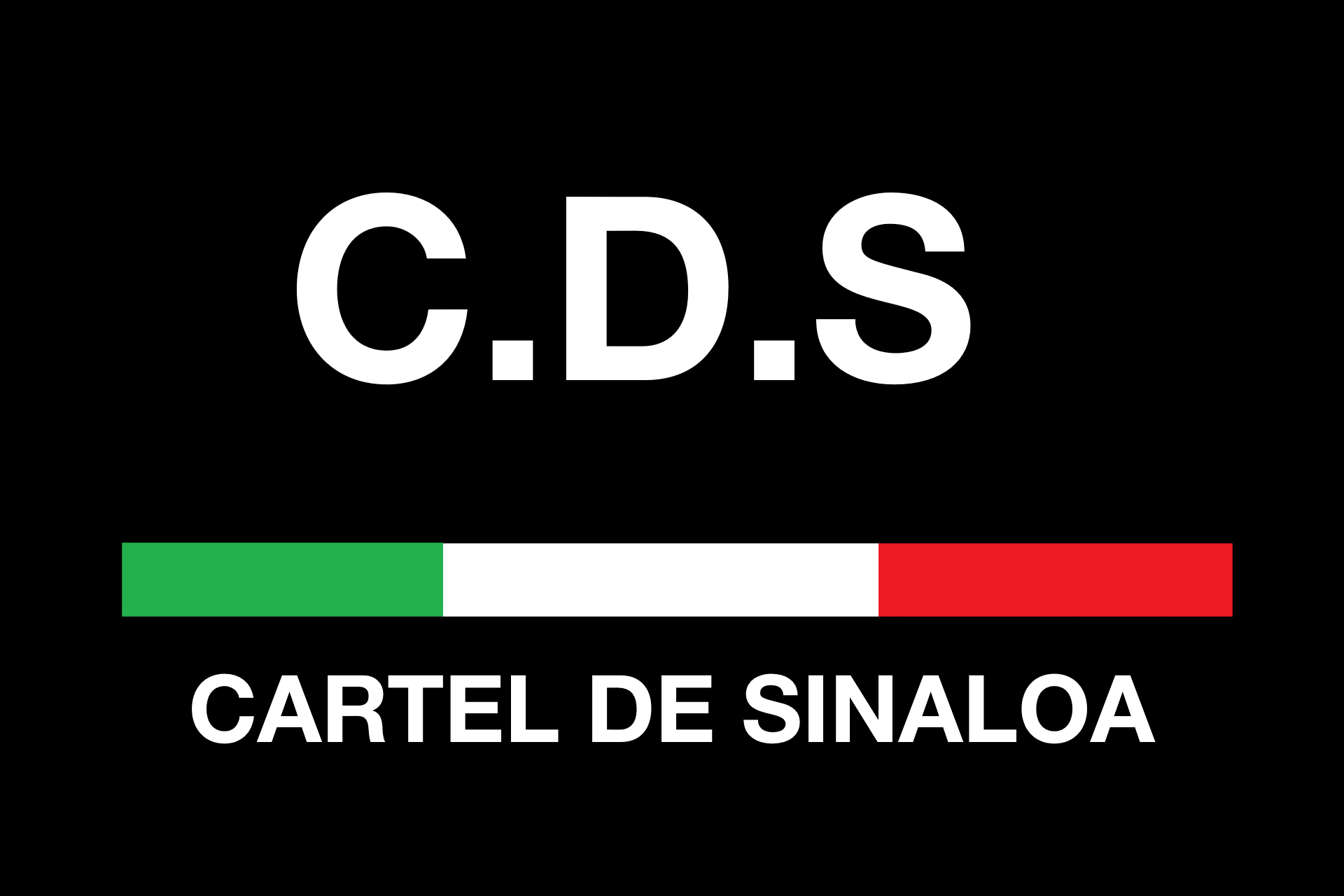
Sinaloa Cartel

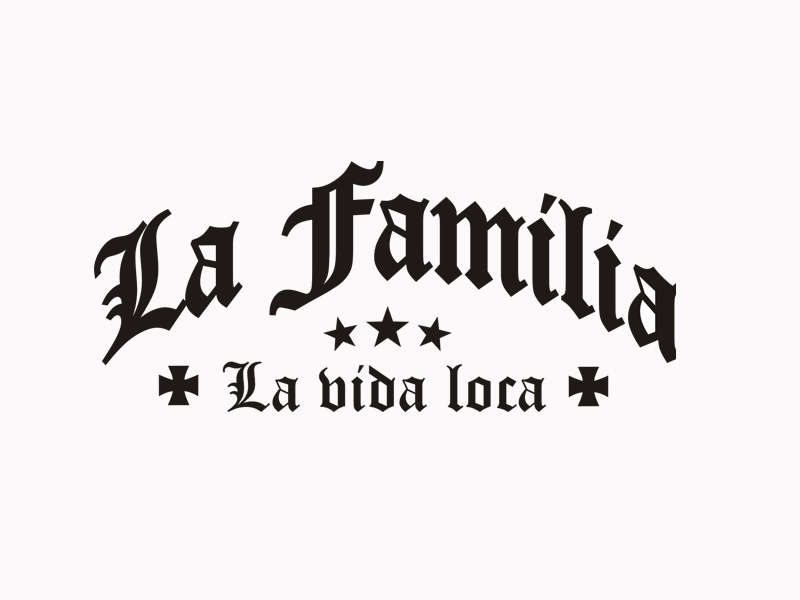
Michoacán Family

== Other flags ==
Siera flag (1812)

Saint Patrick's Battalion flag (1846–1848)

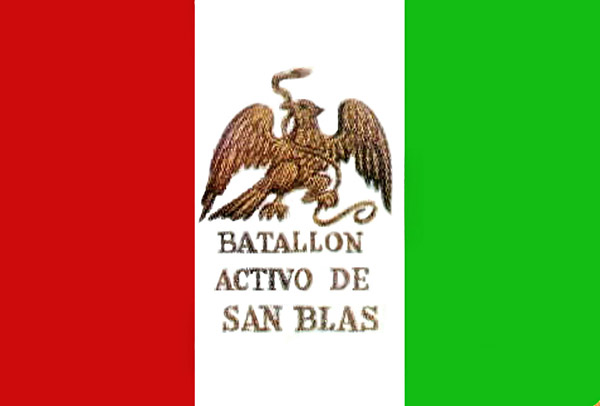
Battalion of San Blas flag (1823–1848)

Constitutionalist Army flag (1913–1920)

Pancho Villa's Northern Division flag (1913–1920)

== See also ==
- Coat of arms of Mexico
- Himno Nacional Mexicano
- Flags of North America
