= Miguel Teurbe Tolón =

Cuban writer (1820–1857)

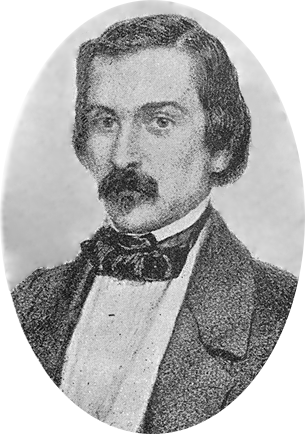
- Miguel Teurbe Tolón
- Born: Miguel Teurbe Tolón y de la Guardia; September 20, 1820; Matanzas, Spanish Cuba
- Died: November 16, 1857 (aged 37); Matanzas, Spanish Cuba
- Occupations: Editor in chief Professor
- Writing career
- Pen name: Lola; La Lola filibustera Tello Rubio Montegú; Alfonso de Torquemada

Miguel Teurbe Tolón y de la Guardia (September 20, 1820 – November 16, 1857) was a Cuban playwright, poet, and the creator of the coat of arms of Cuba and the flag of Cuba.

In 1849, Tolón was declared an enemy of Spain and was forced into exile in the United States. While in the United States, Tolón was a freemason. He was married to Emilia Margarita Teurbe Tolón y Otero.
