= Belize at the 2017 World Championships in Athletics =

- Flag of Belize
- WA code: BIZ
- National federation: Belize Athletic Association
- Website: belizeathletics.wordpress.com

in London, United Kingdom 4–13 August 2017
- Competitors: 1 (1 woman) in 1 event
- Medals: Gold 0 Silver 0 Bronze 0 Total 0

World Championships in Athletics appearances
- 1983; 1987; 1991; 1993; 1995; 1997; 1999; 2001; 2003; 2005; 2007; 2009; 2011; 2013; 2015; 2017; 2019; 2022; 2023

Belize competed at the 2017 World Championships in Athletics in London, United Kingdom, 4–13 August 2017.

== Results ==
=== Women ===
Track and road events

Athlete	Event	Heat		Semifinal		Final	
Athlete	Event	Result	Rank	Result	Rank	Result	Rank
Samantha Dirks	400 metres	54.74	49	Did not advance			
