= List of Jamaican flags =

This is a list of flags used in Jamaica.

== National flag ==
Flag	Date	Use	Description
	1962–	Flag of Jamaica	A gold diagonal cross divides the field into four triangles of green (top and bottom) and black (hoist and fly sides).

== Governor-general ==
Flag	Date	Use	Description
	1962–	Flag of the governor-general of Jamaica	A lion standing on a crown on a blue field, with "Jamaica" underneath.

== Prime minister ==
Flag	Date	Use	Description
	1962–	Standard of the prime minister of Jamaica	A blue flag with the badge of the prime minister in the centre and the letters P and M in the dexter and sinister, and surrounded by a thin white decorative line near the edges of the flag.

== Military flags ==
Flag	Date	Use	Description
		Chief of Defence Staff of the Jamaica Defence Force flag	A four-colored flag with the flag of Jamaica in the canton.
	1962–	Jamaica Defence Force flag	A dark blue flag with the Jamaica Defence Force badge in the centre.
	1962–	Jamaican Naval ensign	A White Ensign with the flag of Jamaica in the canton.
	1962–	Jamaican Air Wing ensign	A light blue ensign with the flag of Jamaica in the canton.

== Historical ==
Flag	Date	Use	Description
	13 October 1510 – 23 January 1516	Colonial flag of Jamaica	The royal banner of arms of the Crown of Castile was first used in 1494, during the discovery of the island by Christopher Columbus, then it was officially used by the colony in 1510.
	23 January 1516 – 9 April 1655	Colonial flag of Jamaica	The Cross of Burgundy was used during the Spanish colonisation.
	10 April 1655 – 30 December 1800	Colonial flag of Jamaica	The flag of Great Britain.
	1 January 1801 – 24 August 1875	Colonial flag of Jamaica	The flag of the United Kingdom.
	25 August 1875 – 31 May 1906	Colonial flag of Jamaica	A British Blue Ensign defaced with the coat of arms of colonial Jamaica within a white circle.
	25 August 1875 – 31 May 1906	Flag of the governor of Jamaica	A Union Flag defaced with the coat of arms of colonial Jamaica.
	1 June 1906 – 8 April 1957	Colonial flag of Jamaica	A British Blue Ensign defaced with the coat of arms of colonial Jamaica within a white circle.
	1 June 1906 – 8 April 1957	Civil ensign of Jamaica	A British Red Ensign defaced with the coat of arms of colonial Jamaica within a white circle.
	1 June 1906 – 8 April 1957	Flag of the governor of Jamaica	A Union Flag defaced with the coat of arms of colonial Jamaica.
	8 April 1957 – 13 July 1962	Colonial flag of Jamaica	A British Blue Ensign defaced with the coat of arms of colonial Jamaica within a white circle.
	8 April 1957 – 13 July 1962	Civil ensign of Jamaica	A British Red Ensign defaced with the coat of arms of colonial Jamaica within a white circle.
	8 April 1957 – 13 July 1962	Flag of the governor of Jamaica	A Union Flag defaced with the coat of arms of colonial Jamaica.
	13 July 1962 – 6 August 1962	Colonial flag of Jamaica	A British Blue Ensign defaced with the coat of arms of colonial Jamaica within a white circle.
	13 July 1962 – 6 August 1962	Civil ensign of Jamaica	A British Red Ensign defaced with the coat of arms of colonial Jamaica within a white circle.
	13 July 1962 – 6 August 1962	Flag of the governor of Jamaica	A Union Flag defaced with the coat of arms of colonial Jamaica.
	1966–2022	Personal flag of Queen Elizabeth II	The shield of the coat of arms of Jamaica (a red cross on a white field, a yellow pineapple is in each arm of the cross), with Queen Elizabeth II's personal monogram imposed in the centre.

== See also ==
- Flag of the West Indies Federation
