= Belize at the 2009 World Championships in Athletics =

- WA code: BIZ

in Berlin
- Competitors: 1 (1 man)
- Medals: Gold 0 Silver 0 Bronze 0 Total 0

World Championships in Athletics appearances
- 1983; 1987; 1991; 1993; 1995; 1997; 1999; 2001; 2003; 2005; 2007; 2009; 2011; 2013; 2015; 2017; 2019; 2022; 2023; 2025

Belize competed at the 2009 World Championships in Athletics in Berlin, Germany, which were held from 15 to 23 August 2009. The athlete delegation consisted of one competitor, hurdler Jonathan Williams. Williams competed in the men's 400 metres hurdles but failed to make it past the qualifying heats, placing seventh out of the eight competitors that competed in his qualifying heat.

== Background ==
The 2009 World Championships in Athletics were held at the Olympiastadion in Berlin, Germany. Under the auspices of the International Amateur Athletic Federation, this was the twelfth edition of the World Championships. It was held from 15 to 23 August 2009 and had 47 different events. Among the competing teams was Belize. For this edition of the World Championships in Athletics, hurdler Jonathan Williams competed for the nation in the men's 400 metres hurdles. Previously, Williams competed for the nation at the 2007 World Championships in Athletics held in Osaka, Japan, competing in the same event.

== Results ==
Williams competed in the qualifying heats of the men's 400 metres hurdles on 15 August in the third heat against seven other athletes, namely Joseph Abraham, Michaël Bultheel, Omar Cisneros, Kerron Clement, Jehue Gordon, Danny McFarlane, and Félix Sánchez. There, Williams recorded a time of 52.41 seconds and placed seventh, failing to advance further as only the top three of each heat and the next four fastest athletes would be able to do so. His time was also the slowest amongst the athletes that completed the race.

| Event | Athletes | Heat Round 1 | | Heat Round 2 | | Semifinal | | Final | |
| Event | Athletes | Result | Rank | Result | Rank | Result | Rank | Result | Rank |
|---|---|---|---|---|---|---|---|---|---|
| 400 m hurdles | Jonathan Williams | 52.41 | 7 | did not advance | | | | | |
