= Queen's Personal Jamaican Flag =

Queen's Personal Flag for Jamaica
- Use: Other
- Adopted: 1966
- Relinquished: 8 September 2022
- Design: The escutcheon of the coat of arms of Jamaica in banner form, defaced with a blue roundel surrounded by a garland of roses encircling a crowned letter 'E'

The Queen's Personal Flag for Jamaica was the personal flag of Queen Elizabeth II for use in Jamaica. The sovereign's representative, the governor-general of Jamaica has his own flag.

== Description ==
The escutcheon of the coat of arms of Jamaica serves as basis for the flag.

The flag consists of a banner of the coat of arms of Jamaica superposed by the Queen's Royal Cypher. The flag is white and bears a red St George's Cross. A gold pineapple is on each arm of the Cross. A blue disc with the Royal Cypher is placed in the centre of the Cross. The disc is taken from the Queen's Personal Flag.

== Coronation standard ==
Coronation standard used in 2023

At the 2023 coronation of King Charles III, the Jamaican national flag was used to represent Jamaica. The standard was borne at Westminster Abbey by the 2023 Rhodes Scholar, David Salmon.

== See also ==
- Flag of Jamaica
- Royal Standard of the United Kingdom
- List of Jamaican flags
