= Coat of arms of Cuba =

- Armiger: Republic of Cuba
- Adopted: 24 April 1906

The Cuban coat of arms is the official heraldic symbol of Cuba. It consists of a shield, in front of a fasces crowned by the Phrygian cap, all supported by an oak branch on one side and a laurel wreath on the other. The coat of arms was created by Miguel Teurbe Tolón in 1849. The current version is not exactly the same as the original. The design specifications of the shield were established by decree by the first president of Cuba, Tomás Estrada Palma, on 21 April 1906.

This symbol is currently the only one used by a communist state that does not feature any socialist heraldry.

== Official blazon ==
Cuban law details the official blazon of the state coat of arms as follows:

The coat of arms is a symbol of the nation that is formed by two arches of equal circles, cut turning concavities to each other, as in an ogival shield. It's split at two thirds of its height, where a horizontal line divides it. It consists of three spaces or fields: the top represents a sea, on its sides, right and left, opposite to each other, two capes or points of land, between which, closing the strait they form, extending from left to right, a key with a thick stem, its ward down, and for its background a rising sun with its rays extending throughout the sky of the landscape. In the lower space or field to its left lie five bends, placed alternately, of the same width, of the colors dark blue and white, blue one being the highest, and all slighted from left to right. In the lower space or field to its right, the figure of a landscape representing a valley, in its center rises a royal palm tree, with the bud of its middle leaf being the highest, standing upright, for its background two mountains and clear skies. The shield is supported by a bundle of sticks, its lower end tied with a red string crossed in saltire, protruding from below the point of the shield. Above, protruding from the central part of the shield, is located a bundle of sticks tied together by a red circular string. The crown of the bundle of sticks is covered by a Phrygian cap of the red color turned right, and is sustained on one of the sticks slightly protruding. In the central part of the cap is a white five-pointed star, one of the points up. Not surpassing the rightmost and leftmost points of the arches of the shield, two branches, with their respective fruit, bordering it, one of laurel to the right, and one of holly oak to the left, facing it and crossed in the lower end of the shield, behind the bundle of sticks.

== Gallery ==
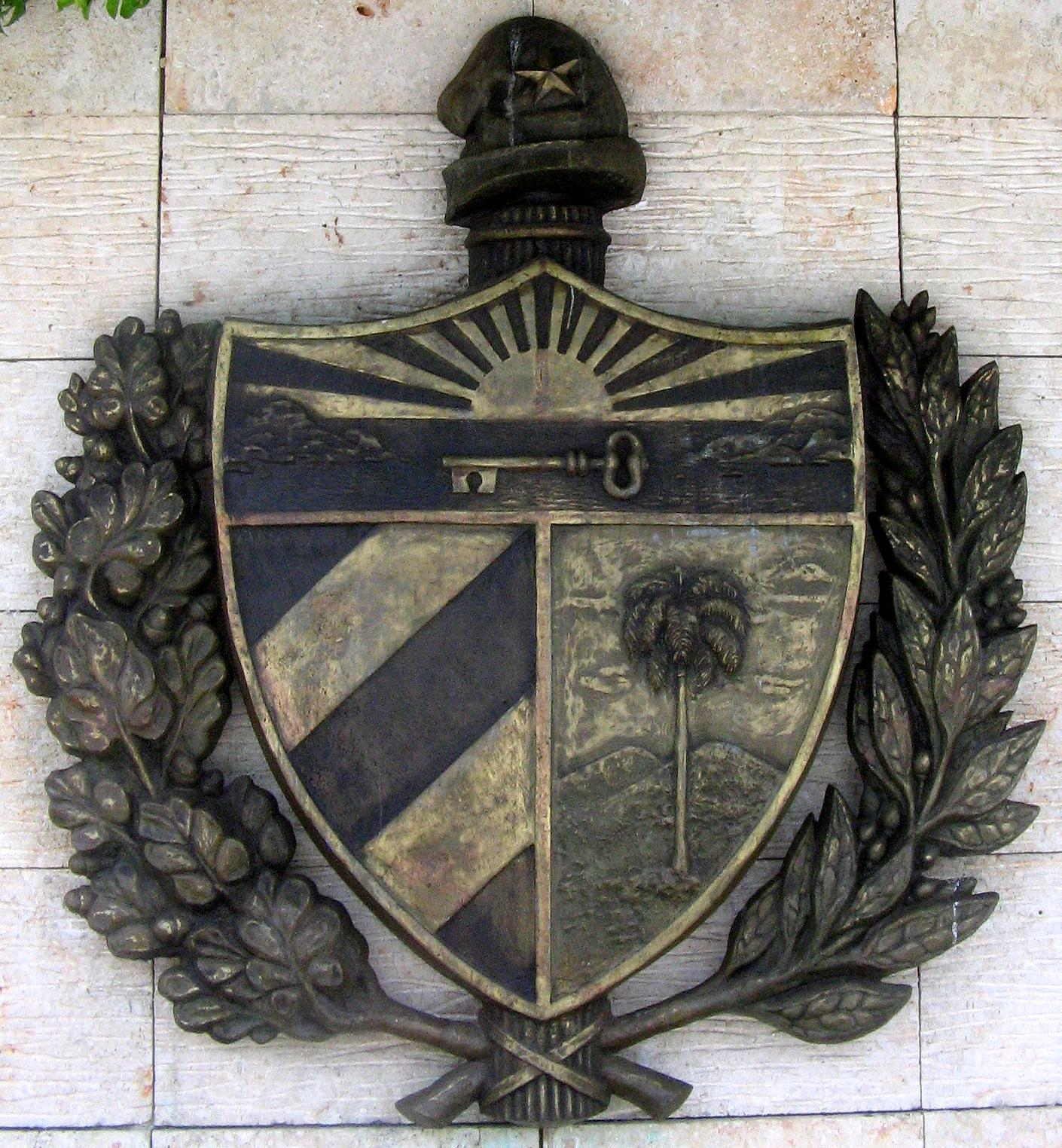
A relief of the coat of arms of Cuba in the Che Guevara Mausoleum of Santa Clara

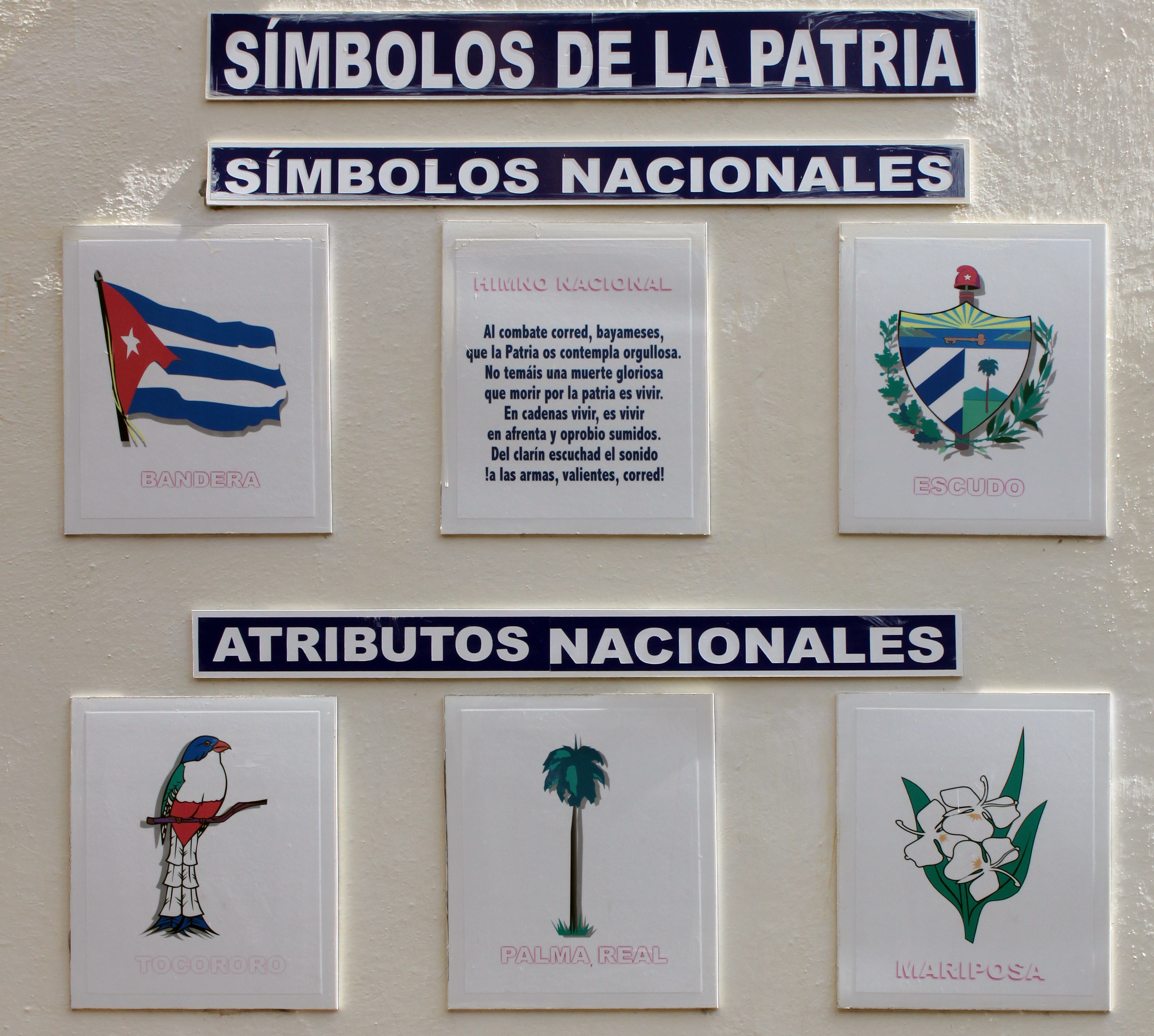
Plaques showing the Cuban national symbols in Sancti Spíritus

== History ==
=== Colonial period ===
==== Spanish Empire ====
Coat of arms of the Spanish colony of Cuba (16th century)

Coat of arms of the Captaincy General of Cuba (19th century)

Royal coat of arms of Spain

==== United States military occupation ====
Coat of arms of the Provisional Government of Cuba

Coat of arms of the United States

Great seal of the United States

=== Republican period ===
Coat of arms of the Cuban Filibuster Movement

Coat of arms of Cuba (1870s–1899)

Coat of arms of Cuba (1902–1906)

Coat of arms of Cuba (1906–present)

== See also ==
- Flag of Cuba
- Coat of arms of Havana
