= List of Nicaraguan flags =

== National flag ==
Flag	Date	Use	Description
	1975–present	Flag of Nicaragua	A horizontal triband of azure (top and bottom) and white with the national coat of arms centered on the white band.
	2025–present	Rojinegra	Horizontal bicolor of red and black.

== Military flags ==
Flag	Date	Use	Description
		Flag of the Nicaraguan Armed Forces	Red field with Nicaragua Armed Forces emblem at the centre—two inscriptions (EJERCITO DE NICARAGUA at the top and PATRIA Y LIBERTAD at the bottom).

== Ethnic group flags ==
Flag	Date	Use	Description
		Flag of the Garifuna people	

== Subdivision flags ==
=== Departments ===
Flag	Subdivision	Adopted	Description
	Boaco		
	Carazo		
	Chinandega		
	Chontales		
	Estelí		
	Granada		
	Jinotega		
	León		
	Madriz		
	Managua		
	Masaya		
	Matagalpa		
	Nueva Segovia		
	Rivas		
	Rio San Juan		

=== Autonomous Regions ===
Flag	Subdivision	Adopted	Description
	North Caribbean Coast		
	South Caribbean Coast		

== Political flags ==
Flag	Date	Use	Description
		Flag of the Alliance for the Republic	
		Flag of the Citizens' Action Party	
		Flag of the Conservative Party	
		Flag of the Constitutionalist Liberal Party	
		Flag of the Independent Liberal Party	
		Flag of the National Opposition Union	
	1912–1979	Flag of the Nationalist Liberal Party	
		Flag of the Nicaraguan Christian Democratic Union	
		Flag of the Nicaraguan Liberal Alliance	
		Flag of the Sandinista National Liberation Front	

== Historical flags ==
Flag	Date	Use	Description
	1524–1785	Burgundy Cross, flag of the Spanish Overseas Territories	
	1638–1707	Flag of England	
	1707–1787	Flag of the Kingdom of Great Britain	
	1785–1821	War ensign of Spain	
	1808–1813	Flag of Spain under Joseph Bonaparte (1808–1813)	
	1819–1820	First flag of Great Colombia	
	1820–1821	Second flag of Great Colombia	
	1821	Flag of the First Mexican Empire	
	1821–1823	Flag of the First Mexican Empire	
	1821–1831	Third flag of Great Colombia	
	1823–1824	Flag of the United Provinces of Central America	
	1824–1838	Flag of the Federal Republic of Central America	
	1831–1834	Flag of the Republic of New Granada	
	1834–1856	Flag of Republic of New Granada and the Granadine Confederation	
	1839–1856; 1873–1889	National flag	
	1839–1856; 1873–1889	State flag	
	1839–1856; 1873–1889	Merchant Navy flag	
	1844–1860	Flag of the United Kingdom	
	1824–1881	Flag of Mosquitia	
	1852–1854	Attributed flag	
	1856–1857	Flag under William Walker	
	1857–1873; 1893–1896	National flag	
	1881–1894	Flag of the Mosquito Reserve	
	1889–1893	Attributed flag	
	1896–1908	National flag	
	November 1898	Flag of the Greater Republic of Central America	
	1908–1971	National flag	
	1912–1933	Flag of the United States used in Nicaragua during U.S. occupation	

== House flags ==
Flag	Date	Use	Description
	1919–2003	House flag of the Lloyd Nicaragüense	Based on William Walker's flag

== See also ==
- Flag of Nicaragua
- Coat of arms of Nicaragua
