= King's House, Jamaica =

Official residence of the governor-general of Jamaica

King's House
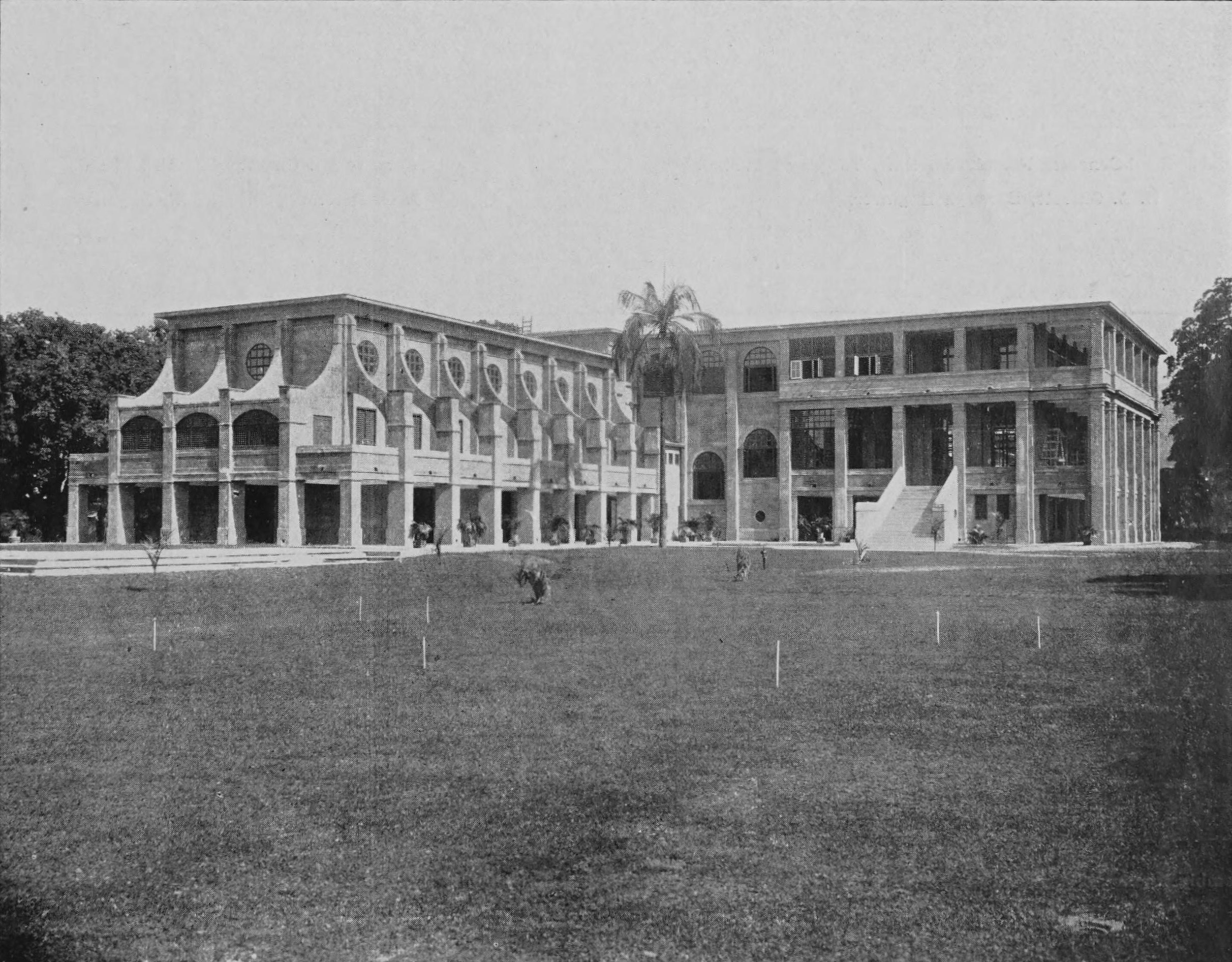
- Interactive map of the King's House area

General information
- Type: Official residence
- Location: St. Andrew, Jamaica, Jamaica
- Coordinates: 18.0232°N 76.7840°W
- Current tenants: Governor-General of Jamaica
- Construction started: 1907
- Completed: 1908
- Owner: Government of Jamaica

Technical details
- Floor count: 3
- Floor area: 16,000 sqft

Design and construction
- Architect: Sir Charles Nicholson

Website
- Official site

King's House (also known as Government House) is the official residence of the governor-general of Jamaica, who represents the Jamaican monarch and head of state. It is located in the part of St. Andrew Parish that is considered part of the city of Kingston.

By the year 1690, the first official residence in Jamaica (for use by the governors of Jamaica) was in Port Royal. Another was constructed in Spanish Town in 1762. When Kingston became the capital of Jamaica in 1872, a new official residence (called King's House) was constructed at the former home of the Anglican Lord Bishop of the Diocese of Jamaica. This house was destroyed by an earthquake in 1907.

Soon after, Sir Charles Nicholson, a British architect, supervised the rebuilding and restoration of King's House. Despite a major fire in 1908, the present King's House is structurally similar to the reconstruction of 1907.

Indian State Banquet at King's House, May 2022

Today, King's House is still used as the office of the governor-general of Jamaica. It is also the venue for state and ceremonial functions, including the swearing in of ministers of government and judges of the High Court.
