= List of Salvadoran flags =

== National ==
Flag	Duration	Use	Description
	1912–present	State and war flag, national ensign	A horizontal triband of cobalt blue (top and bottom) and white with the national coat of arms in the center.
	1912–present	Civil flag	A horizontal triband of white within cobalt blue, the words "DIOS UNION LIBERTAD" in golden capital letters, centered and occupying almost the entire length of the white stripe.
	1912–present		A horizontal triband of white within cobalt blue.

== Subnational ==
Flag	Subdivision	Adopted	Description
	Ahuachapán		
	Cabañas		
	Chalatenango		
	Cuscatlán		
	La Libertad		
	La Paz		
	La Unión		
	Morazán		
	San Miguel		
	San Salvador		
	San Vicente		
	Santa Ana		
	Sonsonate		
	Usulután		

== Cultural ==
Flag	Duration	Use	Description
		Flag of the Lenca people	
		Flag of the Pipil people	

== Historic ==
Flag	Duration	Use
	1525–1701	
	1701–1760	
	1760–1785	
	1785 – 15 September 1821	
	15 September 1821 – 20 February 1822	
	20 February 1822 – 9 February 1823	
	9 February 1823 – 1 July 1823	Flag of the First Mexican Empire
	1 July 1823 – 22 November 1824	Flag of the United Provinces of Central America
	22 November 1824 – February 1841	Flag of the Federal Republic of Central America
	February 1841 – 1842	
	1842–1844	Flag of the Confederation of Central America
	1844 – 9 May 1865	
	9 May 1865 – June 1865	
	June 1865 – 1869	
	1869–1873	
	1873–1877	
	1877 – 2 November 1898	Flag of El Salvador (obverse)
	1877 – 2 November 1898	Flag of El Salvador (reverse)
	2 November 1898 – 30 November 1898	
	30 November 1898 – 17 May 1912	Flag of El Salvador (obverse)
	30 November 1898 – 17 May 1912	Flag of El Salvador (reverse)
	17 May 1912 – 1921	
	1921–1922	Flag of the Federation of Central America
	1922–present	

== See also ==
- Flag of El Salvador
- Coat of arms of El Salvador
- National Anthem of El Salvador
