= O Land of Beauty! =

National anthem of Saint Kitts and Nevis

- National anthem of Saint Kitts and Nevis
- Also known as: National Anthem of the Federation of Saint Christopher and Nevis
- Lyrics: Kenrick Georges
- Music: Kenrick Georges
- Adopted: 1983

Audio sample
- U.S. Navy Band instrumental version: file; help

"O Land of Beauty!" is the national anthem of the Federation of Saint Kitts and Nevis. Written and composed by Kenrick Georges, it was officially adopted as the national anthem of the newly independent nation in 1983, when the federation received its independence from the United Kingdom.

== History ==
In February 1983, the government of Saint Kitts and Nevis announced a competition to find a national anthem and requested submissions. The announcement appeared in The Democrat Newspaper, and the deadline was 31 March 1983 at 4:00 pm.

Kenrick Georges (1955–2019), a trumpeter and arranger for a popular brass band, decided to compose a submission on the last day at 2:00 am. He completed the composition in four hours. An hour later, he took it to Greenlands piano teacher Mrs. Gumbs to record a piano performance of it. After a cassette recording was made, Georges submitted it the same day.

On 3 June 1983, Chairperson of the National Anthem Sub-Committee Pamela Wall announced the winner of the competition. Out of 45 entries, Georges' entry had won, with the committee feeling that it would "stand the test of time." The three other members of the Sub-Committee were Stanley Amory, Lorna Edwards and Lilith Kelsick.

On Saint Kitts and Nevis's first independence day, 19 September 1983, Prime Minister Kennedy Simmonds awarded Georges for his contribution as composer and writer of the national anthem. Georges stated in a 2008 interview that he considered writing the anthem the high point of his musical career. He stated that the idea behind the lyrics was to call for citizens to see the country "for the best of what it was and maintain that as we go along." He described the overall concept as, "Let’s keep St. Kitts and Nevis as it is with respect to the best of what we have between us."

== Lyrics ==
I
O Land of Beauty!
Our country where peace abounds,
Thy children stand free
On the strength of will and love.
With God in all our struggles,
Saint Kitts and Nevis be,
A nation bound together,
With a common destiny.

II
As stalwarts we stand,
For justice and liberty.
With wisdom and truth,
We will serve and honour thee.
No sword nor spear can conquer,
For God will sure defend.
His blessings shall forever,
To posterity extend.
