= Coat of arms of Belize =

- Armiger: Belize
- Adopted: 1981 (standardised in 2019)

The coat of arms of Belize was adopted upon independence in 1981. It differs only slightly from the arms used when Belize was a British colony (the Union Jack has been removed, and a Mestizo has replaced one of the Afro-Belizean woodcutters supporting the shield).

The wreath around the arms is formed of 50 leaves, symbolising the year 1950, "when Belizeans began the struggle for independence". Within the wreath is a mahogany tree, in front of which is a shield split per chevron and per pale. The upper sections of the shield show the tools of a woodcutter, while the lower section shows a ship under sail. These are symbolic of the importance of mahogany in the 18th- and 19th-century Belizean economy. The motto is Sub umbra floreo ("Under the shade I flourish"), a reference to the country's forests and to its establishment as a colony under British protection.

The flag of Belize features the coat of arms in its centre.

== Historical versions ==
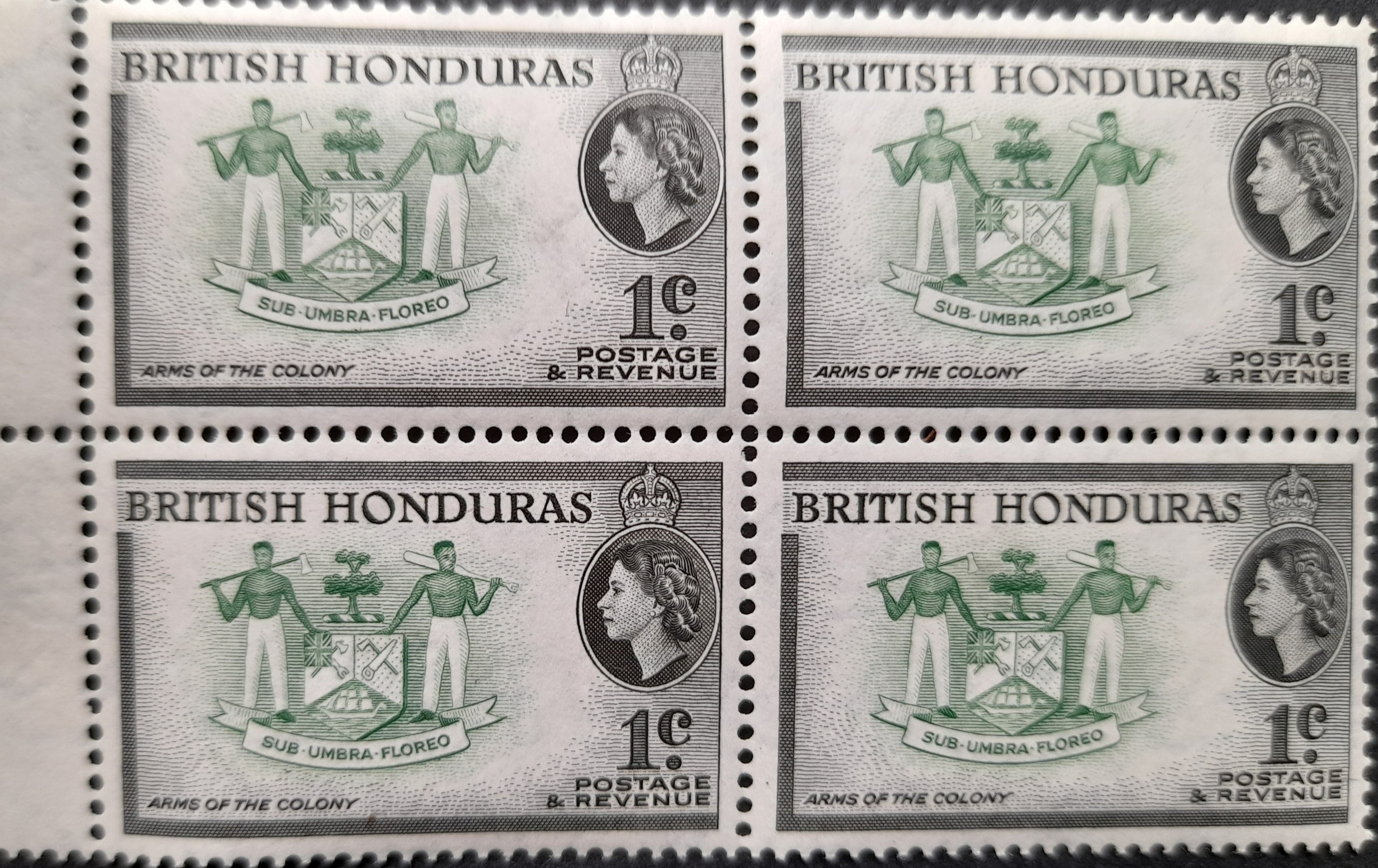
1 Cent Arms of the Colony on British Honduras Queen Elizabeth II stamps, mint block of four left hand margin.

Coat of arms of British Honduras, 1819–1907

Coat of arms of British Honduras, 1907–1967

Coat of arms of British Honduras/Belize, 1967–1981

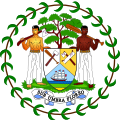
Coat of arms of Belize (1981-2019)
