= List of Trinidadian and Tobagonian flags =

This is the following is a list of flags related with Trinidad and Tobago.

== National flags ==
Flag	Date	Use	Description
	1962–present	Flag of Trinidad and Tobago	A red field with a white-edged black diagonal band from the upper hoist-side to the lower fly-side.
	1962–present	Civil ensign of Trinidad and Tobago	A red field with a white-edged black diagonal band from the upper hoist-side to the lower fly-side.

== Government flags ==
Flag	Date	Use	Description
	1976–present	Presidential flag of Trinidad and Tobago	A blue field with the coat of arms surrounded by laurels in the center.
	1962–present	Flag of the prime minister of Trinidad and Tobago	A white field with the national flag in the canton and defaced with the coat of arms surrounded by laurels.

== Military flags ==
Flag	Date	Use	Description
	1962–present	Flag of the Trinidad and Tobago Air Guard	A blue field with the national flag in the canton and defaced with the Air Guard's emblem.
	1962–present	Flag of the Trinidad and Tobago Regiment	A green field with the Regiment's emblem in the center.
	1962–present	President's flag of the Trinidad and Tobago Regiment	Similar to the national flag, but with a golden border, the emblem of the president in the center, and the coat of arms surrounded by laurels above.
	1962–present	Regimental flag of the Trinidad and Tobago Regiment	A green field with a golden border, the Regiment's emblem in the center, and the coat of arms surrounded by laurels above.
	1962–present	Flag of the Trinidad and Tobago Defence Force	A horizontal tricolour of red, blue, and cyan with the Defence Force's emblem in the center.
	1962–present	Flag of the Trinidad and Tobago Defence Force Reserves	A red field with a horizontal tricoloured band of green, white, and blue with the Defence Force's emblem in the center.
	1962–present	Naval ensign of Trinidad and Tobago	A White Ensign with the national flag in the canton.

== Historical flags ==
=== Spanish rule ===
Flag	Date	Use	Description
	1498–1516	Flag of the Crown of Castile	Quartered banner of arms of Castile, represented by a castle, and León, represented by a lion.
	1516–1785	Flag of the Spanish Empire	A red saltire resembling two crossed, roughly-pruned (knotted) branches, on a white field.
	1785–1797	Flag of the Kingdom of Spain	A horizontal triband flag of red, yellow (double width), and red; charged with the Spanish coat of arms off-centred toward the hoist.

=== Dutch rule ===
Flag	Date	Use	Description
	1628–1680	The Prince's Flag	A horizontal triband of orange, white, and blue.
	1652–1672	States Flag	A horizontal triband of red, white, and blue.

=== Polish–Lithuanian (Couronian) rule ===
Flag	Date	Use	Description
	1654; 1680–1693	Flag of the Polish–Lithuanian Commonwealth	A horizontal triband of red (top), white, and red with the coat of arms of the Polish–Lithuanian Commonwealth in the center.
	1654; 1680–1693	Flag of the Duchy of Courland and Semigallia	A horizontal bicolour of red and white.
	1654; 1680–1693	Merchant ensign of the Duchy of Courland and Semigallia	A red field with a black crab in the center. Also known as the "Crab Flag".

=== French rule ===
Flag	Date	Use	Description
	1662–1667; 1781–1790	Flag of the Kingdom of France	A white banner with several fleurs de lis with the royal coat of arms in the center.
	1790–1794	Flag of the Kingdom of France and the French First Republic	A vertical tricolour of red, white, and blue.
	1794–1803	Flag of the French First Republic	A vertical tricolour of blue, white, and red.

=== Swedish rule ===
Flag	Date	Use	Description
	1733	Flag of Sweden	A blue three-pointed swallowtail field charged with a yellow Nordic cross that extends to the edges; the vertical part of the cross is shifted to the hoist side.

=== British rule ===
Flag	Date	Use	Description
	1639–1649; 1672–1674	Flag of England	A white field with centred red cross.
	1649–1651	Flag of the Commonwealth of England	St George's Cross and an Irish harp juxtaposed.
	1651–1654	Flag of the Commonwealth of England	St George's Cross and St Andrew's cross quartered.
	1762–1781	Flag of the Kingdom of Great Britain	A superimposition of the flags of England and Scotland.
	1803–1962	Flag of the United Kingdom	A superimposition of the flags of England and Scotland with the Saint Patrick's Saltire (representing Ireland).
	1886–1903	Flag of the British Windward Islands	A Blue Ensign with the arms of the Windward Islands.
	1889–1958	Flag of the Colony of Trinidad and Tobago	A Blue Ensign with the arms of Trinidad and Tobago.
	1903–1953	Flag of the British Windward Islands	A Blue Ensign with the arms of the Windward Islands.
	1953–1958	Flag of the British Windward Islands	A Blue Ensign with the arms of the Windward Islands.
	1958–1962	Flag of the West Indies Federation	A blue field with four white horizontal wavy bars (the top pair of bars being parallel and the lower pair also parallel) and an orange sun in the center.
	1958–1962	Flag of the Colony of Trinidad and Tobago	A Blue Ensign with the arms of Trinidad and Tobago.
	1962–1976	Royal flag of Trinidad and Tobago	The coat of arms of Trinidad and Tobago in banner form, which depicts the colours of the national flag. The gold ships represent the three ships Christopher Columbus used on his voyage. The two birds above are hummingbirds. A blue disc of the crowned letter "E", surrounded by a garland of gold roses defaced the flag, which is taken from the Queen's Personal Flag.

== See also ==
- Flag of Trinidad and Tobago
- Coat of arms of Trinidad and Tobago
