= Flag of Cuba =

Republic of Cuba
- Bandera de la Estrella Solitaria (Flag of the Lone Star)
- Use: National flag and ensign
- Proportion: 1:2
- Adopted: 20 May 1902; 124 years ago (modified color on 21 April 1906)
- Design: Three horizontal stripes of indigo blue alternate with two of white with a red equilateral triangle with base fixed to the hoist-side bearing a white five-pointed star in the center.
- Designed by: Miguel Teurbe Tolón, Narciso López and Emilia Teurbe Tolón
- Use: Flag of the president of Cuba
- Adopted: 15 January 1904; 122 years ago
- (the flag of) La Demajagua
- Use: Naval jack
- Adopted: 10 April 1869; 157 years ago

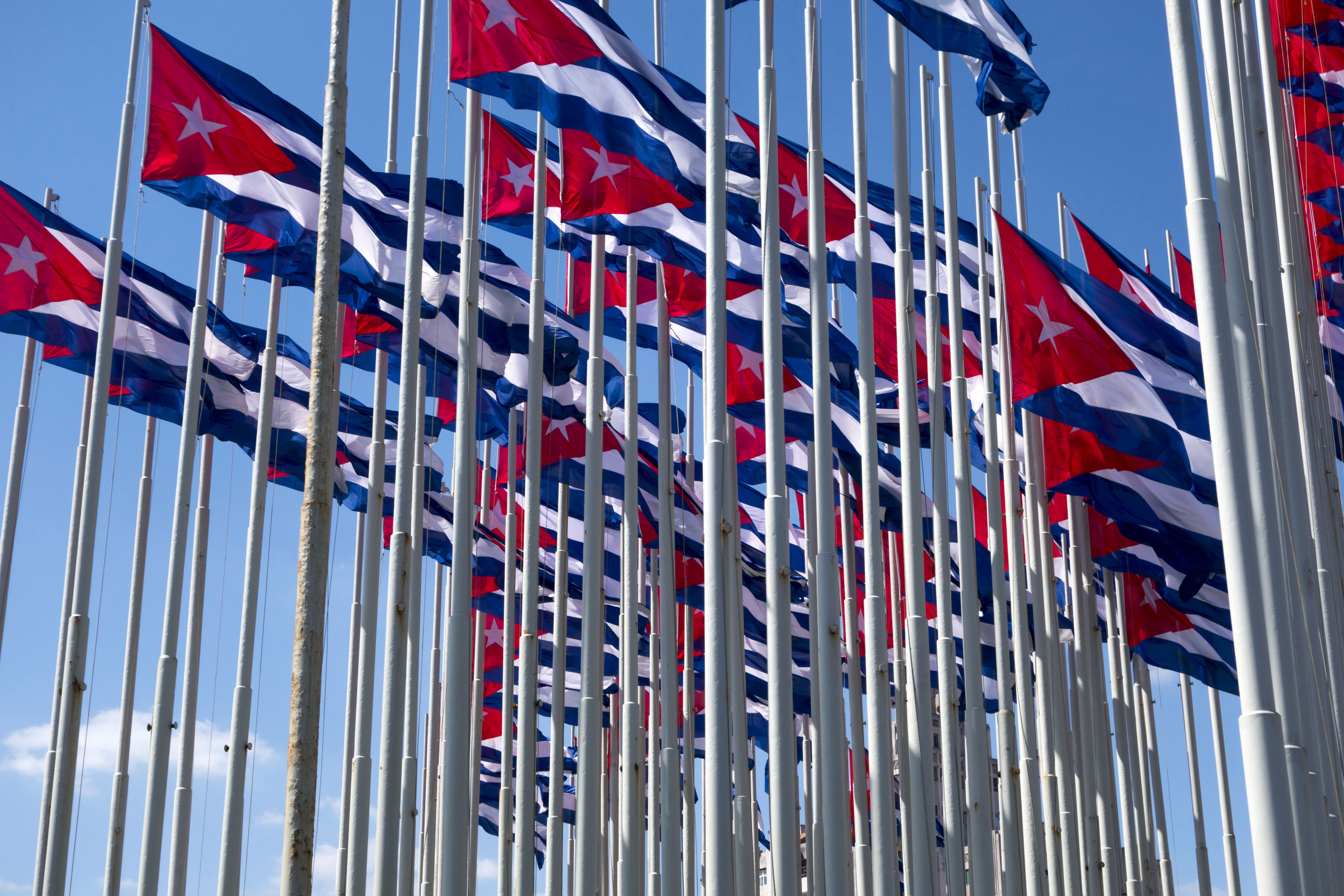
National flags on El Malecón, Havana

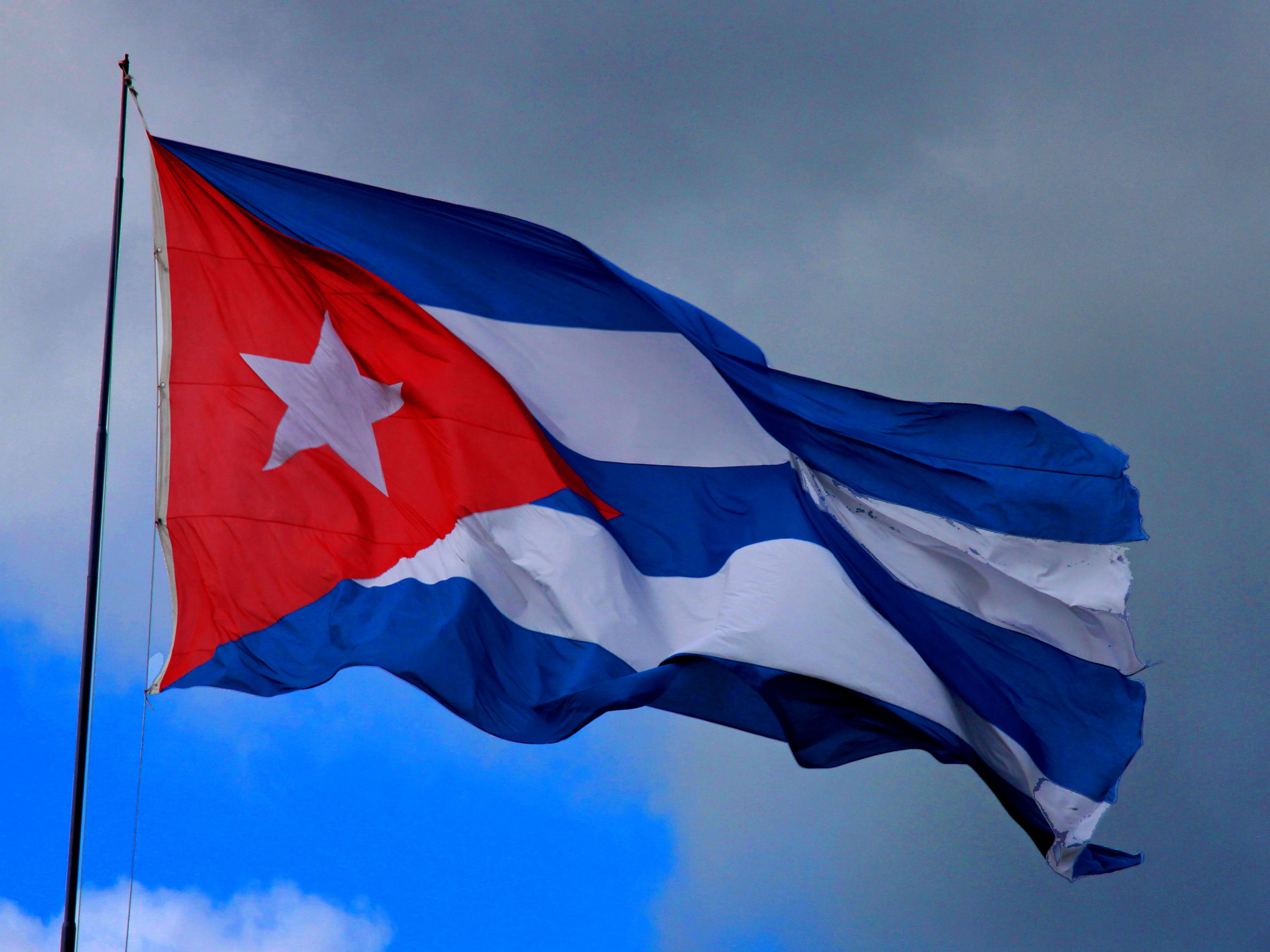
Cuban flag on display in Villa Clara

The national flag of Cuba, also known as the Flag of the Lone Star (Spanish: Bandera de la Estrella Solitaria), consists of five alternating stripes (three navy blue and two white) and a cherry red triangle at the hoist, within which is a white five-pointed star. It was designed in 1849 and officially adopted May 20, 1902. The flag is referred to as the Estrella Solitaria, or the Lone Star flag. Vexillologist Alfred Znamierowski assigns the flag to his Stars and Stripes flag family.

== History and symbolism ==
Fighting against the Spanish Crown with the rebel armies of Venezuela, Narciso López moved from his native Caracas to Havana, Cuba. His involvement in anti-colonial movements forced him into exile. In 1849, he moved to New York City, United States, where he continued to advocate for an independent Cuba.

The three blue stripes represent the three departments in which Cuba was divided at that time; the white, purity of the patriot cause; and the red triangle, a symbol of strength, constancy, and Mason influences (triangles are Masonic symbols for equality and were found in a number of other flags in the former Spanish empire).

The poet Miguel Teurbe Tolón designed the flag alongside Lopez, based upon the story of López's vision. Emilia Teurbe Tolón, Miguel's wife, sewed the first flag, under the guidance and direction of Marta Abreu, the "Patroness of Cuba." López and Tolón, together with José Aniceto Iznaga Borrell, his nephew José María Sánchez Iznaga, Cirilo Villaverde and Juan Manuel Macías, settled upon the final design for the flag of Cuba: two white stripes, three blue, a red triangle, and a lone star.

López used this same flag in 1850 to carry out his ultimately unsuccessful coup attempt to liberate Cuba from Spanish rule. On May 19, 1850, Cuban rebels took the coastal town of Cárdenas, and hoisted the lone-star flag for the first time.

A year after the start of the Ten Years' War, the first Constituent Assembly of the Republic of Cuba met arms in Guáimaro, Camagüey Province. The debate focused on two flags of great symbolism, the Demajagua – which was very similar to the Chilean flag – created by Carlos Manuel de Céspedes to give start to the war of independence, and the Lone Star of López, the latter being chosen in recognition of López having taken the first step towards the freedom of Cuba. The Demajagua flag was not scrapped, but instead was put in the House of Representatives sessions and retained as part of the national treasure.

On the morning of May 20, 1902, the day Cuba officially became an independent republic, Generalissimo Máximo Gómez had the honor of hoisting the flag on the flagpole of the castles of the Tres Reyes del Morro, Havana; with this act, he sealed the end of the Cuban revolution and the end of struggle for Cuban independence, and, at the same time, justified the sacrifice that so many offered to make this dream become reality.

Both the flag and the coat of arms were designed by Miguel Teurbe Tolón. The design specifications of both were formally established by decree of the first president of Cuba, Tomás Estrada Palma, on April 21, 1906. The flag has remained unchanged since then, even during and after the 1959 Cuban Revolution, which established the present-day communist state of the Republic of Cuba.

In 2019, Cuba introduced the "National Symbols Bill". The official press release said the bill "would establish more flexible use of these items with a view toward promoting their greater presence in society, within a legally defined, respectful framework". According to ADN Cuba, the bill states that the flag could be used "as a means of publicity only when the messages that are transferred contribute to fostering and developing patriotic values in people and to form a patriotic conscience of respect and veneration for them and for the historical tradition of the nation". In August 2019, artists from the San Isidro Movement launched a campaign using the hashtag "#LaBanderaEsDeTodos" to protest against restrictions placed on the use of the Cuban flag by the Cuban government and the arrest of artist Luis Manuel Otero Alcántara under the new law.

== Subsequent use ==
In April 1869, López's flag was designated the national banner by the Congress of the Republic of Cuba. López's flag was the model for the flag of Puerto Rico, adopted in 1895 by the Revolutionary Committee of Puerto Rico, a pro-independence group that worked under the auspices of the Cuban Revolutionary Party.

After the United States seized Cuba from Spain during the Spanish–American War, the U.S. flag flew from January 1, 1899, until independence was granted. On May 20, 1902, the Cuban national flag was hoisted as a symbol of independence and sovereignty. It has been used ever since, and the flag has remained unchanged even after the Cuban Revolution of 1959. During the revolution, Cuban prime minister Fidel Castro's 26th of July Movement created a party flag equally divided in red and black like the Angolan national flag, usually in horizontal stripes and often with inscriptions, which is often flown on public buildings.

== Specifications ==

The Cuban flag is at a length-to-width ratio of 2:1. It is made up of five alternating horizontal stripes, three blue and two white. These blue and white stripes are of equal width. Since 1906, the color of blue is specified as azul turquí, a dark, saturated blue such as indigo or Prussian blue. The star within the red equilateral triangle has a diameter that is 1/3 the length of the hoist, and its center is the center of the triangle.

Color scheme	Blue	Red	White
Pantone	301	485	White
CMYK	100-74-0-44	0-94-94-20	N/A
HEX	#002590	#CC0D0D	#FFFFFF
RGB	0-37-144	204-13-13	255-255-255

== Historical versions of the flag ==
Flag of Cross of Burgundy (1521–1843)

Flag of Spanish America (1843–1873; 1874–1898)

Flag of First Spanish Republic (1873–1874)

Céspedes flag of Ten Years' War (1868–1878)

Variant with sky blue stripes used by the Republic of Cuba from 1902 to 1906

== See also ==
- List of Cuban flags
- Coat of arms of Cuba
- Cuban trogon, national bird of Cuba
