= Coat of arms of Jamaica =

Heraldic symbol representing Jamaica

Arms of His Majesty The King in Right of Jamaica
- Armiger: Jamaica
- Adopted: 1661
- Crest: Upon a log fesse wise a crocodile proper
- Torse: Argent and gules
- Shield: Argent on a cross gules five pineapples slipped or
- Supporters: On the dexter side a Taíno native woman holding in the exterior hand a basket of fruits and on the sinister side a Taíno native man supporting by the exterior hand a bow, all proper
- Motto: "Out of many, one people"

The coat of arms of Jamaica is a heraldic symbol used to represent Jamaica. The coat of arms is a legacy design, with its earliest iteration having been granted for the colony of Jamaica in 1661 under Royal Warrant. The original design was created by William Sancroft, then Archbishop of Canterbury. The present design was adopted after Jamaican independence in 1962, with slight modification.

== Official description ==
According to the National Library of Jamaica, the records of the College of Arms, London, describes the coat of arms as follows:

For Arms, Argent on a Cross Gules five pine-apples slipped OR: and upon a representation of Our Royal Helmet mantled OR doubled Ermine, for the Crest, On a Wreath Argent and Gules, Upon a Log fesse wise a Crocodile Proper: And for the Supporters, On the dexter side a West Indian Native Woman holding in the exterior hand a Basket of Fruits and on the sinister side a West Indian Native Man supporting by the exterior hand a Bow all proper.

== Symbolism ==
The motto of the seal has been a matter of discussion for years since inception. The original motto, INDUS UTERQUE SERVIET UNI is the Latin translation for "The Indians twain shall serve one Lord". The motto was replaced in 1962 with the English motto "Out of Many, One People", as tribute to the unity of the different cultural minorities inhabiting the nation. The United States has a similar motto, e pluribus unum, meaning "Out of Many, One" in Latin.

== Changes in the coat of arms ==
The Jamaican coat of arms has seen quite a number of changes, but only three are officially recorded. These changes occurred in 1906, 1957 and 1962.

Arms of Jamaica from 1875 to 1906.

Arms of Jamaica from 1906 to 8 April 1957.

Arms of Jamaica from 8 April 1957 to 13 July 1962.

Arms of Jamaica from 13 July to 6 August 1962.
