= List of flags of the Dominican Republic =

This is a lists of flags used in the Dominican Republic. For more information about the national flag, visit the article Flag of the Dominican Republic.

== National flags ==
Flag	Date	Use	Description
	1849–present	State flag and ensign, war ensign	A crossed two-colored flag with the country's coat of arms in the center. The white cross at the center is taken from the flag of La Trinitaria which led the struggle for independence.
	1849–present	Civil flag and ensign	

== Standards ==
Flag	Date	Use	Description
	?–present	Presidential Standard of the Dominican Republic (at Sea)	
	1930s–1961	Personal flag of Rafael Trujillo	

== Military ==
Flag	Date	Use	Description
		Flag of the Dominican Armed Forces	
		Flag of the Dominican Civil Defence	

=== Land Force ===
Flag	Date	Use	Description
		Flag of the Dominican Army	
		Standard of the Dominican Army Military Academy	

=== Navy ===
Flag	Date	Use	Description
		Naval ensign	
		Naval jack of the Dominican Navy	
		Flag of the Naval Academy	

=== Air Force ===
Flag	Date	Use	Description
		Flag of the Dominican Air Force	

== Police ==
Flag	Date	Use	Description
		Flag of the Dominican National Police	

== Institutional flags ==
Flag	Date	Use	Description
		Flag of the Supreme Court of the Dominican Republic and the Dominican Judiciary System	
		Flag of the Central Electoral Board	
		Flag of the Dominican Port Authority	
		Flag of the General Prosecutor of the Republic	

== Political flags ==
Flag	Date	Party	Description
	1973–present	Dominican Liberation Party	
	2011–present	Country Alliance	
	2009–present	Civic Renovation Party	
	2014–present	Democratic Choice	
	1959–1968	Revolutionary Movement June 14^{es}	

== Historical flags ==
Flag	Date	Use	Description
	1492–1500	Royal flag of the Crown of Castile	Quartered banner of arms of Castile, represented by a castle, and León, represented by a lion.
	1500–1516	Royal flag of the Crown of Castile	The same design of the previous flag, in a rectangular shape.
	1516–1785	Flag of the Captaincy General of Santo Domingo	The Cross of Burgundy flag represents the Spanish Empire.
	1785–1795, 1810–1821, 1861–1865	Flag of Santo Domingo	A horizontal triband of red, yellow, and red with the coat of arms off-centred toward the hoist. In 1861, general Pedro Santana asked queen Isabella II of Spain to retake control of the Dominican Republic, after a period of only 17 years of independence. Spain, which had not come to terms with the loss of its American colonies 30 years earlier, accepted his proposal and made the country a colony again.
	1795–1809	Flag of the Saint-Domingue	The tricolour flag of the French First Republic. France came to own the whole island by the Treaty of Basel, as Spain ceded Santo Domingo as a consequence of the French Revolutionary Wars.
	1809–1813	Flag of Spain under Joseph Bonaparte	A white field with the coat of arms off-centred toward the hoist.
	1821–1822	Flag of Spanish Haiti	On 9 February 1822, Jean-Pierre Boyer annexed the Spanish out of the colony of Santo Domingo, which a few months before had proclaimed its independence from Spain (30 November 1821) under the name Republica del Haiti Español. An attempt to declare its alliance to Gran Colombia, the flag was raised in the early weeks of 1822, but it was short-lived when nine weeks later Boyer had ended the republic.
	1822–1844	Flag of the Unification of Hispaniola	
	1844–1849	Flag of the Dominican War of Independence	It was developed from the flag of Haiti and was added a white symmetric cross.
	1849–1861	Flag of the First Dominican Republic	A crossed two-colored flag with the country's coat of arms in the center.
	1905–1908	Flag of the United States	Thirteen horizontal stripes alternating red and white; in the canton, 45 white stars on a blue field.
	1908–1912	Flag of the United States	Thirteen horizontal stripes alternating red and white; in the canton, 46 white stars on a blue field.
	1912–1924	Flag of the United States	Thirteen horizontal stripes alternating red and white; in the canton, 48 white stars on a blue field.

== See also ==
- Provinces of the Dominican Republic
