= Flag of Belize =

Belize
- Use: National flag and ensign
- Proportion: 3:5
- Adopted: 21 September 1981 (standardised 28 August 2019)
- Design: A royal blue field with two red narrow horizontal stripes along the top and the bottom edges and the large white disk in the centre bearing the National Coat of Arms.

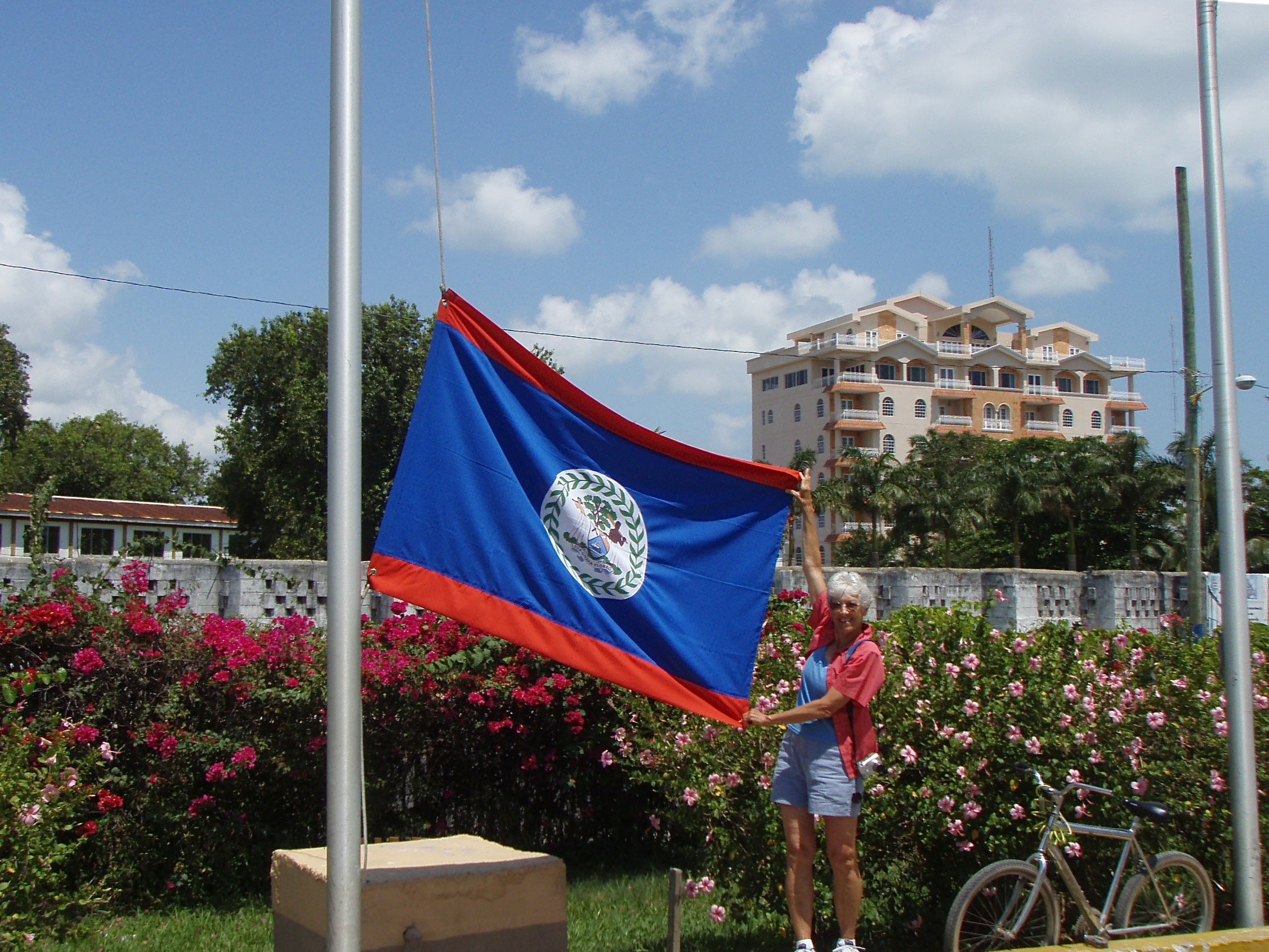
Belize flag being raised

The flag of Belize was adopted on 21 September 1981, the day Belize became independent. It consists of the coat of arms of Belize on a blue field with red stripes at the top and bottom.

British Honduras obtained a coat of arms on 28 January 1907, which formed the basis of the badge used on British ensigns. The coat of arms recalls the logging industry that first led to British settlement there. The figures, tools, and mahogany trees represent this industry. The national motto, Sub Umbra Floreo, meaning "Under the Shade I Flourish", is written in the lower part of the coat of arms. It is one of two national flags, alongside Malta, to depict a human.

== Description ==
The flag is royal blue, with a white disc at the centre containing the national coat of arms held by a mestizo and a man of African descent. Belize is the only country to have humans depicted as a major design element on its national flag, although the flag of Malta contains an image of Saint George on the badge of the George Cross, and the flags of British overseas territories Montserrat and the Virgin Islands, and that of French Polynesia also depict humans.

Several other countries' flags have human body parts depicted. The flag of Brunei has human hands, and the flags of Uruguay and Argentina both have human facial features depicted in a personified sun.

The flag is bordered at top and bottom by two red stripes. In all, the flag incorporates 19 different colours and shades, making it one of the most colourful national flags in the world.

The colours on the flag are respectively those of the country's national parties, the People's United Party (PUP), and United Democratic Party (UDP). The UDP, established in 1973, had objected to the original blue and white design, those two colours being the PUP's representative colours.

The two red stripes at the top and bottom were added to the original design at independence. The coat of arms was granted in 1907. Red stripes were added to denote the colour of the opposition party. The 50 leaves recall 1950, the year PUP came to power.

== History ==
From 1950 onward, an unofficial national flag was in use. It was blue, with the coat of arms on a white disc in the centre (sometimes a blank white circle was used as the coat of arms because it was difficult to draw).

In 1981, Belize gained its independence and a competition was held to design a national flag for the country. The winning submission consisted of the unofficial national flag used by the People's United Party with a red border added to all four sides. This was changed to a red border on just the top and bottom before the design was officially adopted. The winning design, which was also known as the "Flag of Unity" was made by two government officials: Everal Waight, Public Secretary, and Inez Sanchez, Chief Education Officer.

A tattered, but mostly intact Belize flag was found by police officers in the ruins of the World Trade Center in the aftermath of the September 11th attacks. The flag was brought to the Embassy of Belize and subsequently returned home to Belize at the request of Prime Minister Said Musa. The flag currently is housed in the Museum of Belize. Belize lost a single citizen in the attacks – Alva Jeffries Sanchez, who was working on the 96th floor of the North Tower when it was impacted by Flight 11.

There were no standardised specifications for the flag of Belize until 2019. The hue of the flag's colours, proportions, the shading of the two men, and other elements often varied. In 2019, the National Celebrations Commission started a standardisation process of the flag with consent from both the PUP and the UDP. They planned to have the standardised flags be hoisted on 1 September 2019, the National Flag Day of Belize. There are plans to formalise the standardisation through national legislation.

== Historical flags ==
Flag of British Honduras (1870–1919)

Civil ensign of British Honduras (1870–1919)

Flag of British Honduras/Belize (1919–1981)

Civil ensign of British Honduras/Belize (1919–1981)

Standard of the governor of British Honduras/Belize

Unofficial civil flag of British Honduras/Belize (1950–1981).
This flag was the basis for the current flag.

Flag flown from 1981 until 28 August 2019 before standardisations

== Colours ==
	Blue	Red	White	Green	Brown 1	Brown 2	Yellow	Light blue
HEX	#171696	#d90f19	#ffffff	#338a00	#b68a6a	#653024	#ffe682	#9dc9e2
RGB	23,22,150	217,15,25	255,255,255	51,138,0	182,138,106	101,48,36	255,230,130	157,201,226

== Other flags ==
Flag of the Governor-General of Belize

== See also ==
- Coat of arms of Belize
- List of Belizean flags
- Flag of Laos, similar design with simple white circle
