= Flag of Saint Helena =

Saint Helena
- Flag of Saint Helena
- Use: Civil and state flag, state ensign
- Proportion: 1:2
- Adopted: 1984
- Design: A Blue Ensign with the coat-of-arms of Saint Helena in the outer half.

The flag of Saint Helena consists of a Blue Ensign defaced with the shield from the British overseas territory's coat of arms. Adopted in 1984 shortly after the island was granted a new coat of arms, it has been the flag since. Saint Helena's flag is similar to the flags of eight other British Overseas Territories, which are also Blue Ensigns with their respective coats of arms.

== History ==
Saint Helena was first sighted by João da Nova in May 1502. The East India Company (EIC) was later conferred a royal charter to govern the island in 1659. It briefly came under Dutch sovereignty in 1673, before becoming a crown colony for the duration of Napoleon's exile there from 1815 until his death in 1821. After reverting back to EIC control for thirteen years, it became a crown possession again in 1834.

The flag used from 1874 to 1985.

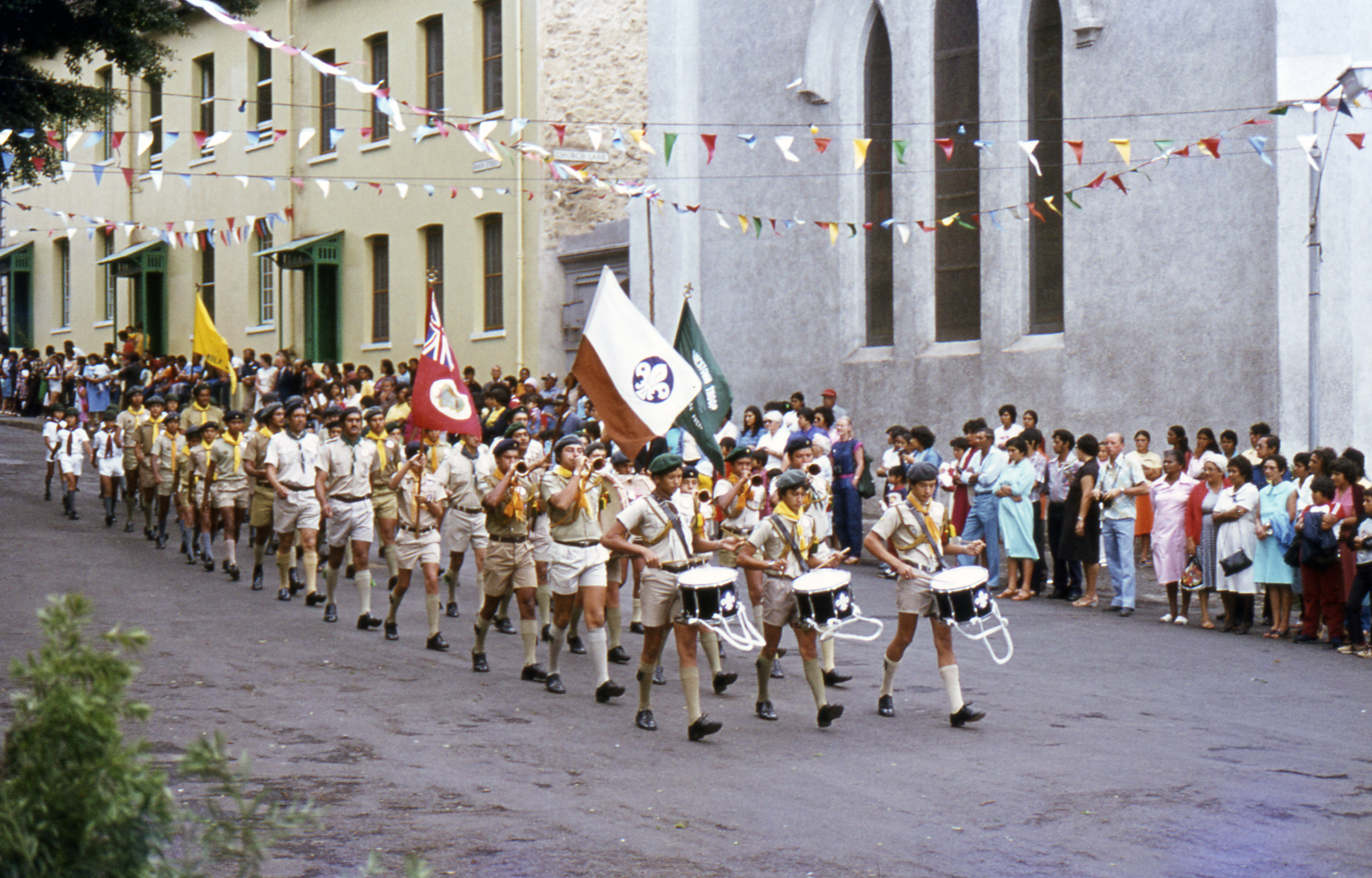
The 1st Jamestown Scout Group at a Saint Helena's Day parade in 1984, the photo shows the old version of the Saint Helena Red Ensign.

Saint Helena was accorded its own badge in 1874 that was eventually utilised on its flag. This consisted of a depiction of the territory's rocky coastline and an East Indiaman. The badge was later redesigned in 1984, with the Saint Helena plover added to the upper portion. Although this change was publicised in the island's government gazette in January of that year, authorisation was only granted by the Admiralty a decade later in 1994.

The flag with the illustration since 2019.

The territory's flag was also utilised as the official flag of Tristan da Cunha, as well as on Ascension Island in an unofficial capacity. This continued until the two islands adopted their own distinct flags in 2002 and 2013, respectively. Minor updates were made to the shield (and, by extension, the flag of Saint Helena) in April 2019, amid concerns that the illustration of the wirebird had become misrepresented. The island's government consequently invited the College of Arms in London to create an up-to-date painting of the coat of arms that could be digitally generated while remaining faithful to the colors prescribed in the 1984 Gazette. Two years later, the territory's flag was hoisted at New Palace Yard in the Palace of Westminster on 21 May 2021, a public holiday on the island that honours the feast day of Helena of Constantinople. It was part of an effort by Lindsay Hoyle, the Speaker of the House of Commons at the time, to observe the ceremonial days of overseas territories.

== Design ==
=== Symbolism ===
The colours and symbols of the flag carry cultural, political, and regional meanings. The bird on the yellow field is a Saint Helena plover that epitomises the fauna of the territory. Popularly referred to by Saint Helenians as the wirebird, it is the last species of bird that is endemic to the island, and is the official bird of Saint Helena. The Cross of Saint George flown from the three-masted sailing ship is a conspicuous symbol of the Kingdom of England, Saint Helena's mother country.

=== Similarities ===
The Blue Ensign is also used on the flags of eight of the thirteen other British Overseas Territories, with their coats of arms in the fly being the lone distinguishing feature between them. These are, specifically, the flags of Anguilla, the British Virgin Islands, the Cayman Islands, the Falkland Islands, Montserrat, the Pitcairn Islands, South Georgia and the South Sandwich Islands, and the Turks and Caicos Islands.

== Variants ==
The standard of the territory's governor features the Union Jack defaced with the territorial coat of arms at the centre. Ships registered in Saint Helena fly the Red Ensign, since there is no defaced variant for the island.

Variant flag of Saint Helena
Variant flag	Date	Usage
	1874–1985	Standard of the Governor of Saint Helena
	1985–1999	Standard of the Governor of Saint Helena
	2019–	Standard of the Governor of Saint Helena

== See also ==
- Flag of Saint Helena, Ascension and Tristan da Cunha
  - Flag of Ascension Island
  - Flag of Tristan da Cunha
