= Flag of the Cayman Islands =

Cayman Islands
- Use: Civil and state flag, state ensign
- Proportion: 1:2
- Adopted: 1999
- Design: A British blue ensign with the coat of arms of the Cayman Islands in the fly

The flag of the Cayman Islands consists of a Blue Ensign defaced with the British overseas territory's coat of arms. Adopted in 1959 to supplement the Union Jack and to replace the flag of the Colony of Jamaica, it has been the flag of the Cayman Islands since the territory was granted self-government that year. The design of the present flag entailed removing the white disc and outlining the coat of arms with a white trim, although the previous version is often used in an official capacity. The Cayman Islands' flag is similar to the flags of eight other British Overseas Territories, which are also Blue Ensigns with their respective coats of arms.

== History ==
The Cayman Islands were first spotted by Christopher Columbus on 10 May 1503, during his fourth and final journey to the West Indies. The Spanish initially named the islands Las Tortugas due to the sizable population of turtles living in the nearby waters. Less than three decades later, the territory was referred to as the Caimanas or Caymanes, in regard to the alligators (caimánes) that were purportedly native to the isles. No permanent inhabitants resided there until well after the Treaty of Madrid in 1670, in which Habsburg Spain permanently relinquished sovereignty over the Cayman Islands and several other islands in the Caribbean to the Kingdom of England. The Caymans subsequently became a dependency of the Colony of Jamaica in 1863. After fourteen years, the three islands of Grand Cayman, Little Cayman, and Cayman Brac were consolidated under a common administration.

The flag used from 1958 until 1999.

The Cayman Islands were granted their own coat of arms on 14 May 1958. It was consequently utilised on the Blue Ensign, with a white disc as its background. This was adopted as a proxy national flag in 1959, after authorisation was granted by the Admiralty. The territory was given self-government in July of the same year, around the time that they joined the West Indies Federation. They remained a British territory after the federation was dissolved in 1962. The usage of both the Blue Ensign and the Red Ensign – a courtesy flag flown unofficially on private ships – was ultimately authorised in 1988. The flag was redesigned eleven years later, with the size of the coat of arms increased, and the white disc removed and replaced with a white outline. The Union Jack remains the state flag of the Cayman Islands.

=== Continued use of the white disc flag ===
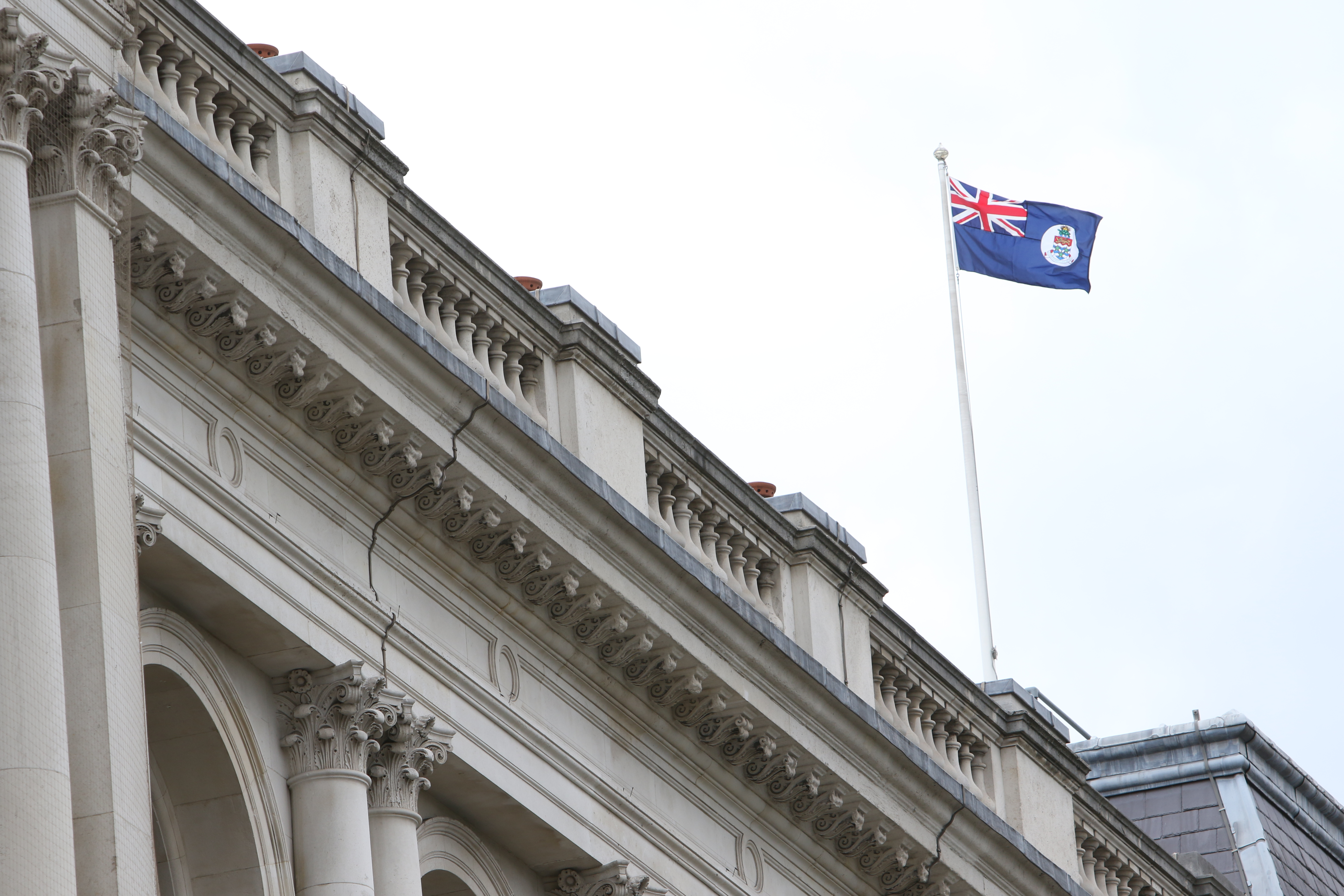
The "old" flag of the Cayman Islands flies above the Foreign Office in London, in 2016

Although the flag was officially changed in 1999, both old and new flags are interchangeably used in an official capacity. According to the Government of the Cayman Islands, the flag includes the white roundel, unchanged from before 1999. The Parliament of the Cayman Islands has vested responsibility for the sale and production of all national flags to the National Museum and because they regard the white disc version to be correct, the vast majority of flags produced have white discs. The white disc flag is employed as the backdrop for the official 2020 portrait of the Governor of the Cayman Islands on the UK Government Website and for the portraits of most government officials.

== Design ==
=== Symbolism ===
The colours and symbols of the flag carry cultural, political, and regional meanings. The blue and white waves evoke the Caribbean Sea, while the three green stars represent the territory's three islands of Grand Cayman, Little Cayman, and Cayman Brac. The yellow lion on the red field is a conspicuous symbol of the Kingdom of England, the Cayman Islands' mother country. The turtle alludes to the original Spanish name for the islands (Las Tortugas), as well as its tradition of seafaring. The pineapple signifies Cayman's connection with Jamaica, whose coat of arms features five pineapples. The turtle and pineapple also epitomise the flora and fauna of the islands. The motto, "He hath founded it upon the seas", is derived from the Book of Psalms 24:2, and recognises the Christian patrimony of the islands.

=== Similarities ===
The Blue Ensign is also utilised on the flags of eight of the thirteen other British Overseas Territories, with their coats of arms in the fly being the sole difference between them. These are, namely, the flags of Anguilla, the British Virgin Islands, the Falkland Islands, Montserrat, the Pitcairn Islands, Saint Helena, Ascension and Tristan da Cunha, South Georgia and the South Sandwich Islands, and the Turks and Caicos Islands.

== Variants ==
The standard of the territory's governor features the Union Jack defaced with the territorial coat of arms at the centre. The civil ensign (for merchant ships) is nearly identical in design to the territorial flag, but uses a Red Ensign instead.

Variant flags of the Cayman Islands
Variant flag	Date	Usage
	1971–1999	Standard of the Governor of the Cayman Islands
	1988–1999	Civil ensign
	1999–	Standard of the Governor of the Cayman Islands
	1999–	Civil ensign

== Protocol ==
Advice regarding flag etiquette is the responsibility of the territory's Protocol Office. When displayed together with the flags of other sovereign nations, the foreign flag should not be flown on top of or to the right (i.e. observer's left) of the Caymanian flag. The only exception to this recommendation is when the Union Jack is flown, in which case the flag of the Cayman Islands yields pride of place to it.

The guidelines also state that the flag is not to touch the ground, nor should it be suspended vertically. It ought to be hoisted at sunrise and lowered at sunset, unless the flag is illuminated at night. When it becomes damaged and is no longer fit to be publicly displayed, it is permissible to dispose of the territorial flag, ideally via burning.

== See also ==
- List of flags of the United Kingdom
