= Flag of Montserrat =

British overseas territory flag

Montserrat
- Use: Civil and state flag, state ensign
- Proportion: 1:2
- Adopted: 1960 (modified coat of arms on 25 January 1999)
- Design: A British blue ensign with the coat of arms in the fly side

The flag of Montserrat consists of a Blue Ensign with the British overseas territory's coat of arms. Adopted in 1960 to supplement the Union Jack after the dissolution of the British Leeward Islands the year before, it has been the flag of Montserrat since the territory was granted self-government that year. The design of the present flag entailed enlarging the coat of arms and outlining it with a white trim. Montserrat's flag is similar to the flags of eight other British Overseas Territories, which are also Blue Ensigns with their respective coats of arms.

== History ==
Montserrat was first spotted by Christopher Columbus in November 1493 during his second voyage to the West Indies, and was named after the Santa Maria de Montserrat Abbey in Spain. It was later colonised by the Kingdom of England in 1632, when Thomas Warner – the first governor of Saint Christopher – sent Irish Catholics from his island to Montserrat. Other Irish settlers from the Colony of Virginia consequently relocated to the territory. Sovereignty over the island changed hands between the British and the French for the duration of the 17th and 18th centuries. This continued until 1783, when the Peace of Paris saw France permanently relinquish Montserrat to Great Britain.

Montserrat became part of the British Leeward Islands federation in 1871. The island was granted its own shield on 10 April 1909. It was consequently utilised on the Blue Ensign after the federation was dissolved on 1 July 1956. This was adopted as a proxy national flag in 1960, after authorisation was granted by the Admiralty. Montserratians ratified the territory's constitution that same year, and the island became a distinct crown colony in 1962. The flag was later redesigned in 1999, with the size of the shield increased, and the white disc removed and replaced with a white outline. To coincide with the Diamond Jubilee of Elizabeth II in 2012, the Foreign and Commonwealth Office started flying the flags of overseas territories over its Main Building in Whitehall to commemorate a "significant day in each of their respective histories". The date chosen for Montserrat was 17 March, a public holiday on the island honouring both Saint Patrick's Day and an unsuccessful slave uprising there on that day in 1768. The territory's flag was also hoisted at New Palace Yard in the Palace of Westminster on 17 March 2021, as part of an effort by Lindsay Hoyle – the Speaker of the House of Commons at the time – to observe the ceremonial days of overseas territories.

== Design ==
=== Symbolism ===
The colours and symbols of the flag carry cultural, political, and regional meanings. The woman donning a green dress portrays Erin, the national personification of Ireland. The Celtic harp she is grasping is another representation of that nation. Both these symbols pay tribute to the Irish settlers who moved to Montserrat from 1632 onwards. The inaugural census conducted in the British Leeward Islands in 1678 found that 70% of the island's inhabitants who were Caucasian claimed Irish ancestry, representing the highest concentration of Irish residents in the federation. The cross alludes to the Christian heritage of the island, (Note: The World Factbook estimates that 67.1% of Montserratians were Protestant and 11.6% were Roman Catholic in 2001.) while the woman's hold of it signifies the Montserratians' love of Christ.

=== Similarities ===
The Blue Ensign is also employed on the flags of eight of the thirteen other British Overseas Territories, with their coats of arms in the fly being the only distinguishing feature between them. These are, specifically, the flags of Anguilla, the British Virgin Islands, the Cayman Islands, the Falkland Islands, the Pitcairn Islands, Saint Helena, Ascension and Tristan da Cunha, South Georgia and the South Sandwich Islands, and the Turks and Caicos Islands.

== Variants ==
The standard of the territory's governor features the Union Jack defaced with the territorial coat of arms at the centre.

Variant flags of Montserrat
Variant flag	Date	Usage
	1909–1960	Flag and government ensign of Montserrat
	1960–1999	Flag and government ensign of Montserrat
	–1999	Standard of the governor of Montserrat
	1999–	Standard of the governor of Montserrat

== See also ==
- List of United Kingdom flags
