= Armorial of the United Kingdom =

List of coats of arms of the United Kingdom

This is a list of coats of arms of the United Kingdom, its constituent parts, Crown Dependencies, its Overseas Territories, and the Royal Family.

== United Kingdom ==
Coat of arms of the United Kingdom

Coat of arms of the United Kingdom for use in Scotland

=== Countries of the United Kingdom ===
Royal arms of England

Coat of arms of Northern Ireland (obsolete) (Note: The coat of arms of Northern Ireland was granted to the Executive Committee for Northern Ireland which was abolished in 1972, and the arms are no longer used. The heraldic banner taken from this coat of arms, known as the Ulster banner, is still sometimes used as an unofficial flag of Northern Ireland.)

Royal arms of Scotland (Note: The Kingdom of Scotland used a full achievement which is listed in the section for predecessor states. The full achievement typically used today, for example on Acts of the Scottish Parliament, is the Coat of arms of the United Kingdom in Scotland. The escutcheon continues to be used in other contexts to represent Scotland.)

Royal Badge of Wales

=== Government ===
Coat of arms of the United Kingdom used by HM Government

Coat of arms of the United Kingdom used by the Scotland Office

Royal arms of the United Kingdom used by the Privy Council and the Home Office

Coat of arms of the United Kingdom displayed on Acts of Parliament, Acts of the Northern Ireland Assembly and some older government publications

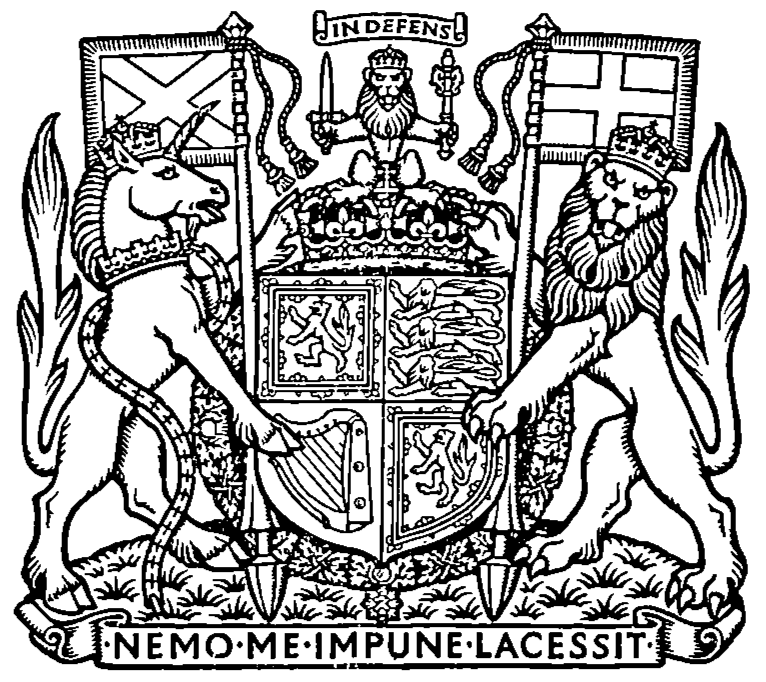
Scottish version of the coat of arms of the United Kingdom displayed on Acts of the Scottish Parliament

Badge of the Ministry of Defence

Badge of the Supreme Court of the United Kingdom

Crowned portcullis emblem used by Parliament

== Crown Dependencies ==
Coat of arms of Guernsey, part of the Bailiwick of Guernsey

Coat of arms of Alderney, part of the Bailiwick of Guernsey

Coat of arms of Herm, part of the Bailiwick of Guernsey

Coat of arms of Sark, part of the Bailiwick of Guernsey

Coat of arms of the Bailiwick of Jersey

Coat of arms of the Isle of Man

== Overseas Territories ==
Coat of arms of Anguilla

Akrotiri and Dhekelia do not have their own unique coat of arms. The coat of arms of the United Kingdom is used instead.

Coat of arms of Bermuda

Coat of arms of the British Antarctic Territory

Coat of arms of the British Indian Ocean Territory

Coat of arms of the British Virgin Islands

Coat of arms of the Cayman Islands

Coat of arms of the Falkland Islands

Coat of arms of Montserrat

Coat of arms of Pitcairn Islands

Coat of arms of South Georgia and the South Sandwich Islands

Coat of arms of the Turks and Caicos Islands

=== Gibraltar ===
The coat of arms of Gibraltar is the oldest in use in an overseas territory of the United Kingdom and is unique in that it dates from before the period of British colonial administration. The version used by the government of Gibraltar are the same as the royal coat of arms of the United Kingdom combined with a badge featuring the own coat of arms of Gibraltar.

Coat of arms of Gibraltar

Coat of arms of the Government of Gibraltar

=== Saint Helena, Ascension and Tristan da Cunha ===
Saint Helena, Ascension Island and Tristan da Cunha comprise one British Overseas Territory. There is no flag or coat of arms for the entire territory; each of the constituent parts has its own insignia.

Coat of arms of Ascension Island

Coat of arms of Saint Helena

Coat of arms of Tristan da Cunha

== Cities ==
=== England ===
Bath

Birmingham

Bradford

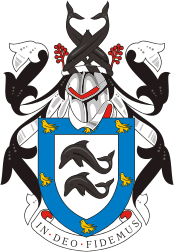
Brighton

Bristol

Cambridge

Canterbury

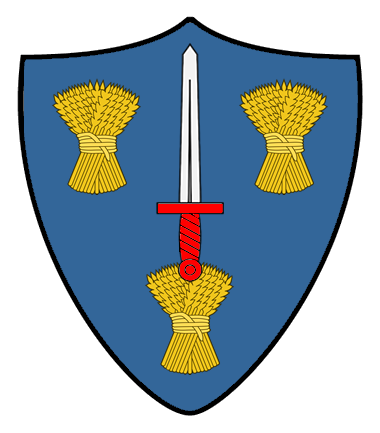
Chester

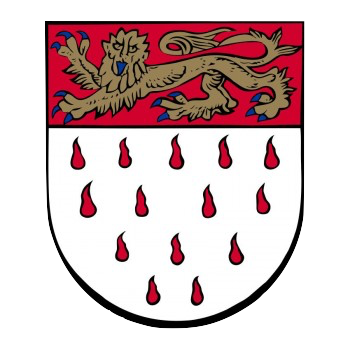
Chichester

Colchester

Coventry

Derby

Durham

Exeter

Gloucester

Hereford

Kingston upon Hull

Lancaster

Leeds

Leicester

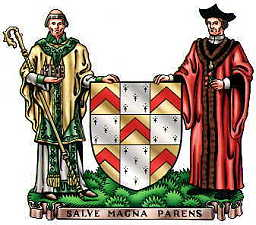
Lichfield

Lincoln

Liverpool

City of London

Manchester

Newcastle upon Tyne

Norwich

Nottingham

Oxford

Plymouth

Portsmouth

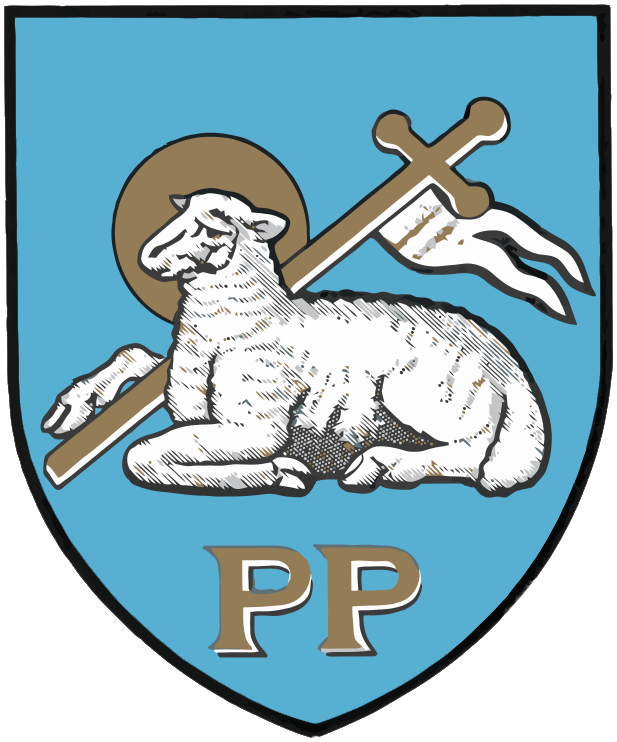
Preston

Ripon

Salford

Sheffield

Southampton

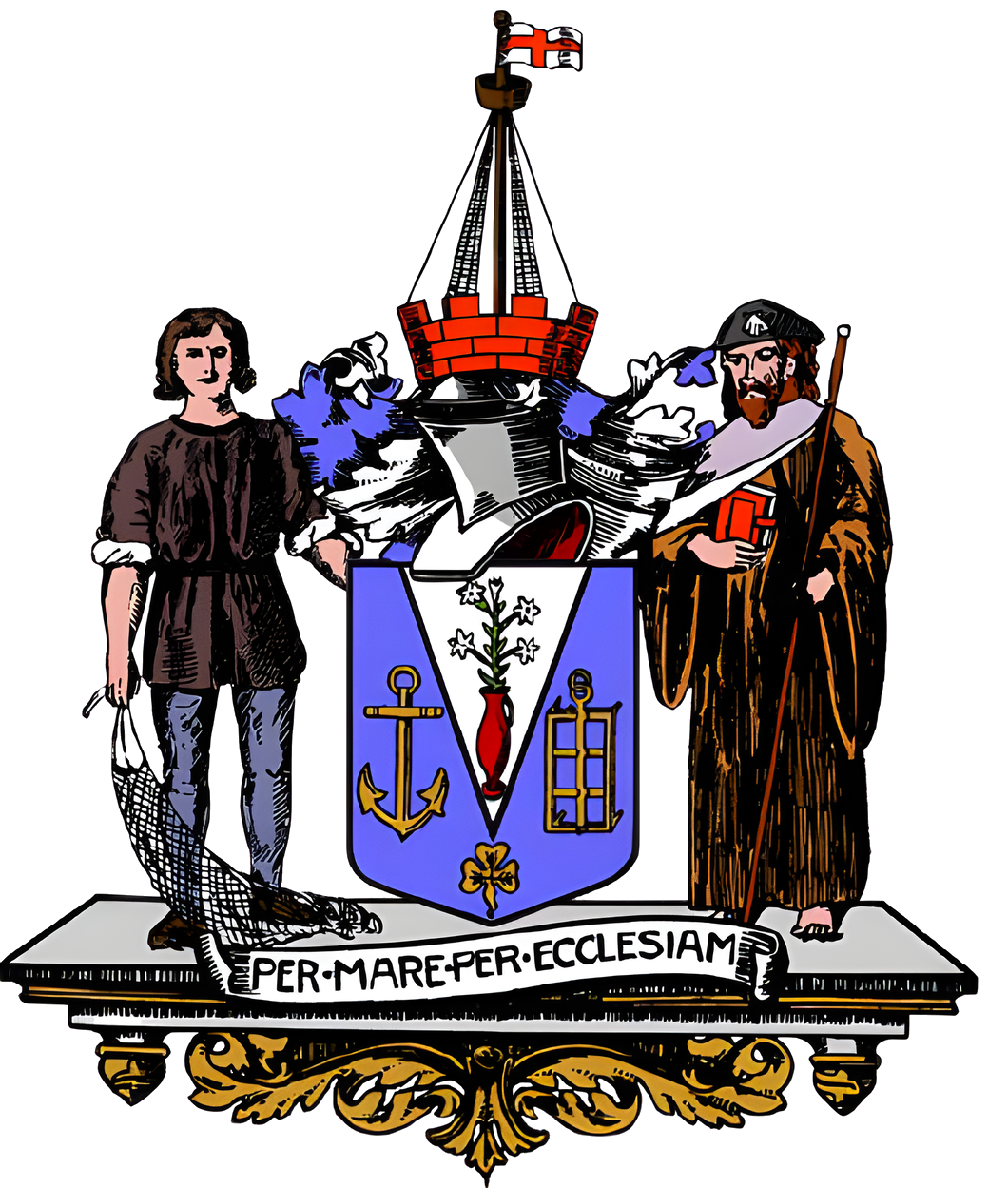
Southend-on-Sea

St Albans

Stoke-on-Trent

Sunderland

Wakefield

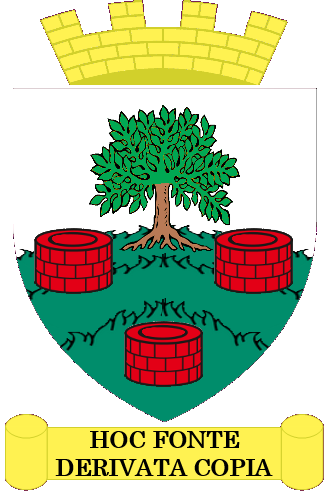
Wells

City of Westminster

Winchester

Wolverhampton

Worcester

York

=== Northern Ireland ===
Armagh

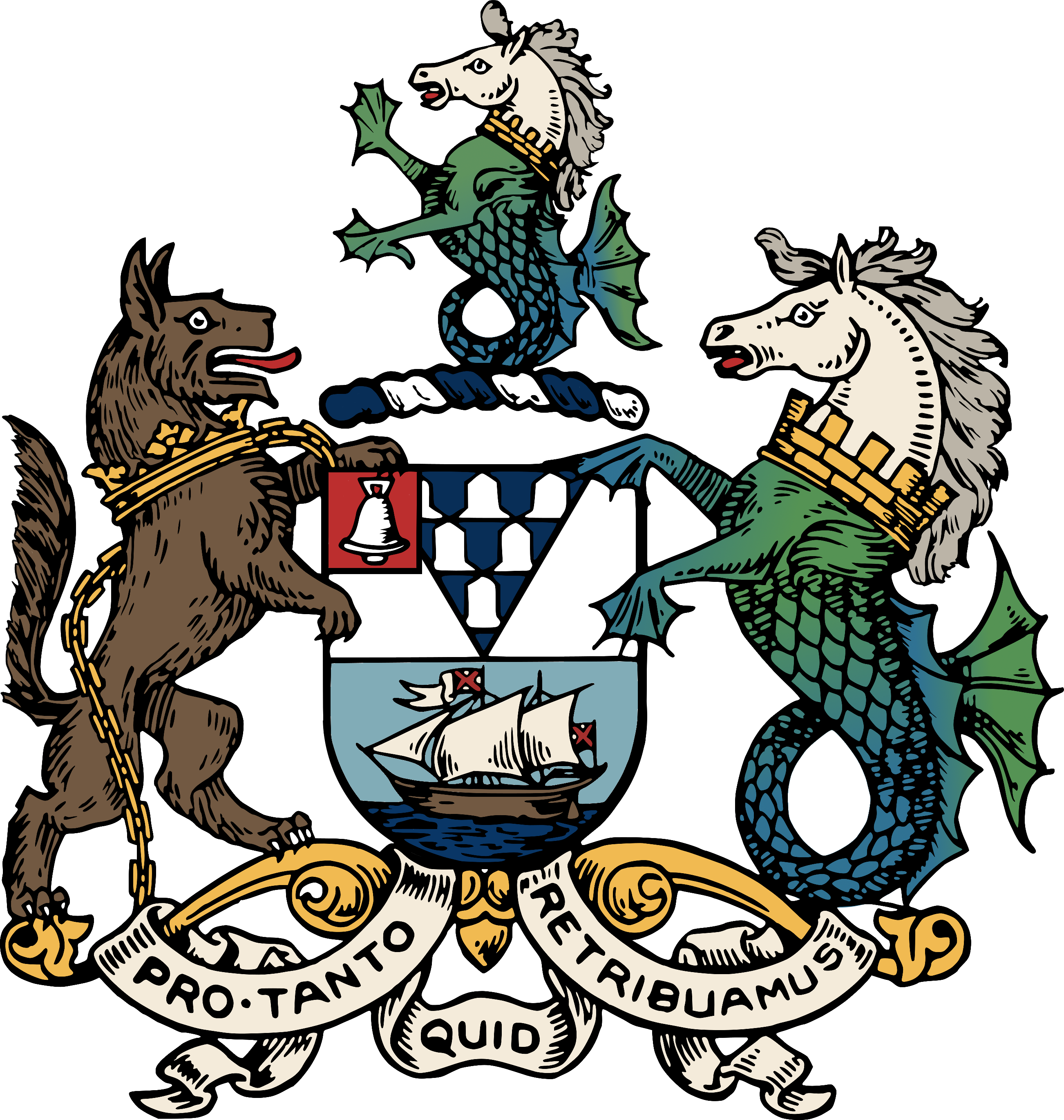
Belfast

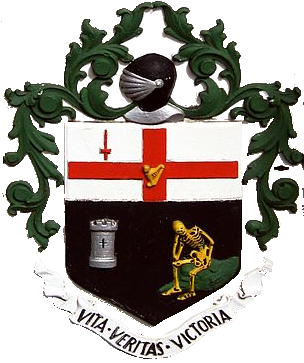
Derry

=== Scotland ===
Aberdeen

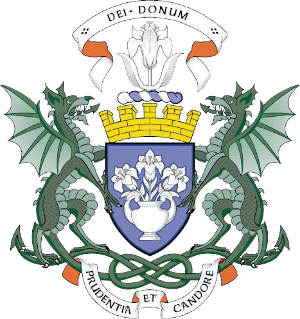
Dundee

Edinburgh

Glasgow

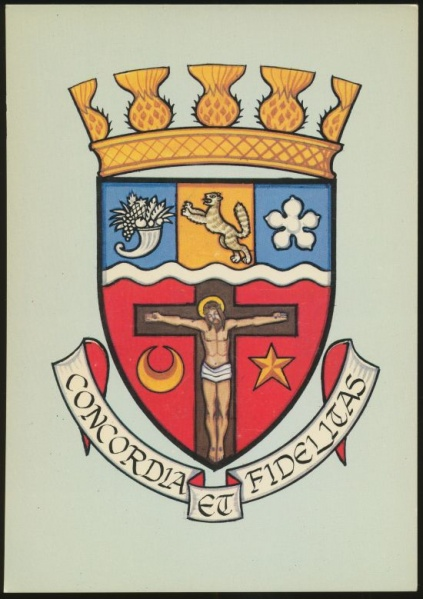
Inverness

Perth

Stirling

=== Wales ===
Cardiff

Newport

Swansea

== Institutions ==
Coat of arms of the BBC

Coat of arms of British Airways (national flag carrier)

British European Airways (defunct)

Coat of arms of the British Railways Board (defunct)

Coat of arms of the Post Office (state-owned company)

Coat of arms of the United Kingdom Atomic Energy Authority

== Historical ==
Coat of arms of Great Britain, 1707–1714

Coat of arms of Great Britain, 1714–1801

Coat of Arms of the United Kingdom, 1801–1816

Coat of Arms of the United Kingdom, 1816–1837

Coat of Arms of the United Kingdom, 1901–1952

Coat of Arms of the United Kingdom, 1952–2022

Coat of Arms of Great Britain as used in Scotland, 1707–1714

Coat of Arms of Great Britain as used in Scotland, 1714–1801

Coat of Arms of the United Kingdom as used in Scotland, 1801–1816

Coat of Arms of the United Kingdom as used in Scotland, 1816–1837

Coat of Arms of the United Kingdom as used in Scotland, 1837–1952

Royal Badge of Wales, 1953–2008

Coat of arms of the United Kingdom used by HM Government before 2022

=== Colonies ===
Coat of arms of Basutoland (1951-1966)

Coat of arms of the Cape Colony (1875–1910)

Coat of arms of the East India Company during company rule in India (1757-1858)

Coat of arms of British Guiana (1955-1966)

Coat of arms of British Honduras (1907-1967)

Coat of arms of British Central Africa (1895-1907)

Coat of Arms of British South Africa Company (1889-1965)

Coat of arms of British Hong Kong (1959–1997)

Coat of arms of the British Leeward Islands (1909–1940)

Coat of arms of the Colony of Natal (1907-1910)

Coat of arms of Newfoundland and Labrador (1637)

Coat of arms of the Crown Colony of North Borneo (1948-1963)

Coat of arms of Saint Christopher-Nevis-Anguilla (1958-1967)

Coat of arms of the Federation of Rhodesia and Nyasaland (1953-1963)

Coat of arms of the Colony of Saint Lucia (1939-1967)

Coat of arms of the Straits Settlements (1911-1946)

Coat of arms of the Colony of Trinidad and Tobago (1958-1962)

Coat of arms of the Colony of Virginia (1715)

Coat of arms of the West Indies Federation (1958–1962)

Coat of arms of the British Windward Islands (1953-1960)

=== Predecessor states ===
==== England ====
Royal arms of the Kingdom of England, 1198-1340

Royal arms of the Kingdom of England, 1399-1603

Royal arms of the Kingdom of England, 1603-1649 and 1660-1689

Coat of arms of the Commonwealth of England, 1649-1653

Coat of arms of The Protectorate, 1653-1659

Coat of arms of the Commonwealth of England, Scotland and Ireland, 1659-1660

Royal arms of the Kingdom of England, 1689-1694

Royal arms of the Kingdom of England, 1694-1702

Royal arms of the Kingdom of England, 1702-1707

==== Ireland ====
Arms of the Lordship of Ireland, 1177-1542

Arms of the Kingdom of Ireland, 1542-1801

Arms of the Kingdom of Ireland (with crest)

==== Scotland ====
Royal coat of arms of the Kingdom of Scotland, 1565-1603

Royal coat of arms of the Kingdom of Scotland, 1603-1649

==== Wales ====
Arms of the Kingdom of Gwynedd and the Principality of Wales, 1240-1282

Arms of Dafydd ap Gruffydd (last autonomous Prince of Wales), 1282-1283

== Royal family ==
Coat of arms of the sovereign, King Charles III

Scottish version of the arms of the sovereign

Coat of arms of William, Prince of Wales

Coat of arms of William as Duke of Rothesay

Coat of arms of Prince Harry, Duke of Sussex

Coat of arms of Anne, Princess Royal

Scottish version of the arms of the Princess Royal

Coat of arms of Andrew Mountbatten-Windsor

Coat of arms of Princess Beatrice, Mrs Edoardo Mapelli Mozzi

Coat of arms of Princess Eugenie, Mrs Jack Brooksbank

Coat of arms of Prince Edward, Duke of Edinburgh

Scottish version of the arms of the Duke of Edinburgh

Coat of arms of Prince Richard, Duke of Gloucester

Coat of arms of Prince Edward, Duke of Kent

Coat of arms of Princess Alexandra, The Honourable Lady Ogilvy

Coat of arms of Prince Michael of Kent

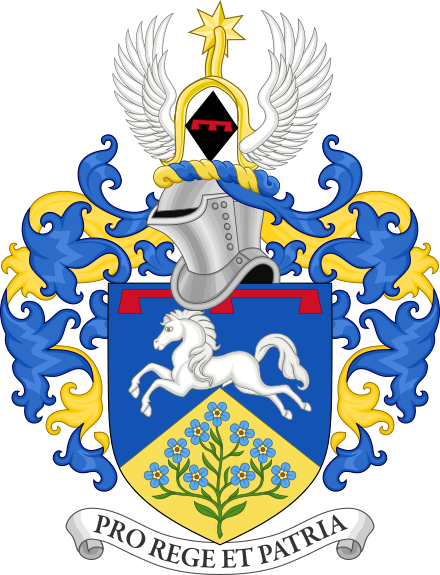
Coat of arms of Peter Phillips

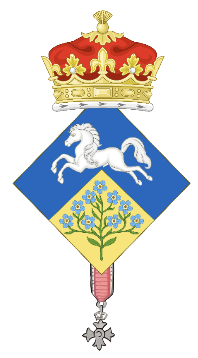
Coat of arms of Zara Tindall

=== Consorts ===
Coat of arms of Queen Camilla

Scottish version of the arms of Queen Camilla

Coat of arms of Catherine, Princess of Wales

Coat of arms of Meghan, Duchess of Sussex

Coat of arms of Sophie, Duchess of Edinburgh

Coat of arms of Birgitte, Duchess of Gloucester

Coat of arms of Princess Michael of Kent

== See also ==
- Armorial of British universities
- Armorial of schools in the United Kingdom
- Armorial of Europe
- List of flags of the United Kingdom
- Armorial of county councils of England
