= Flags of Saint Helena, Ascension and Tristan da Cunha =

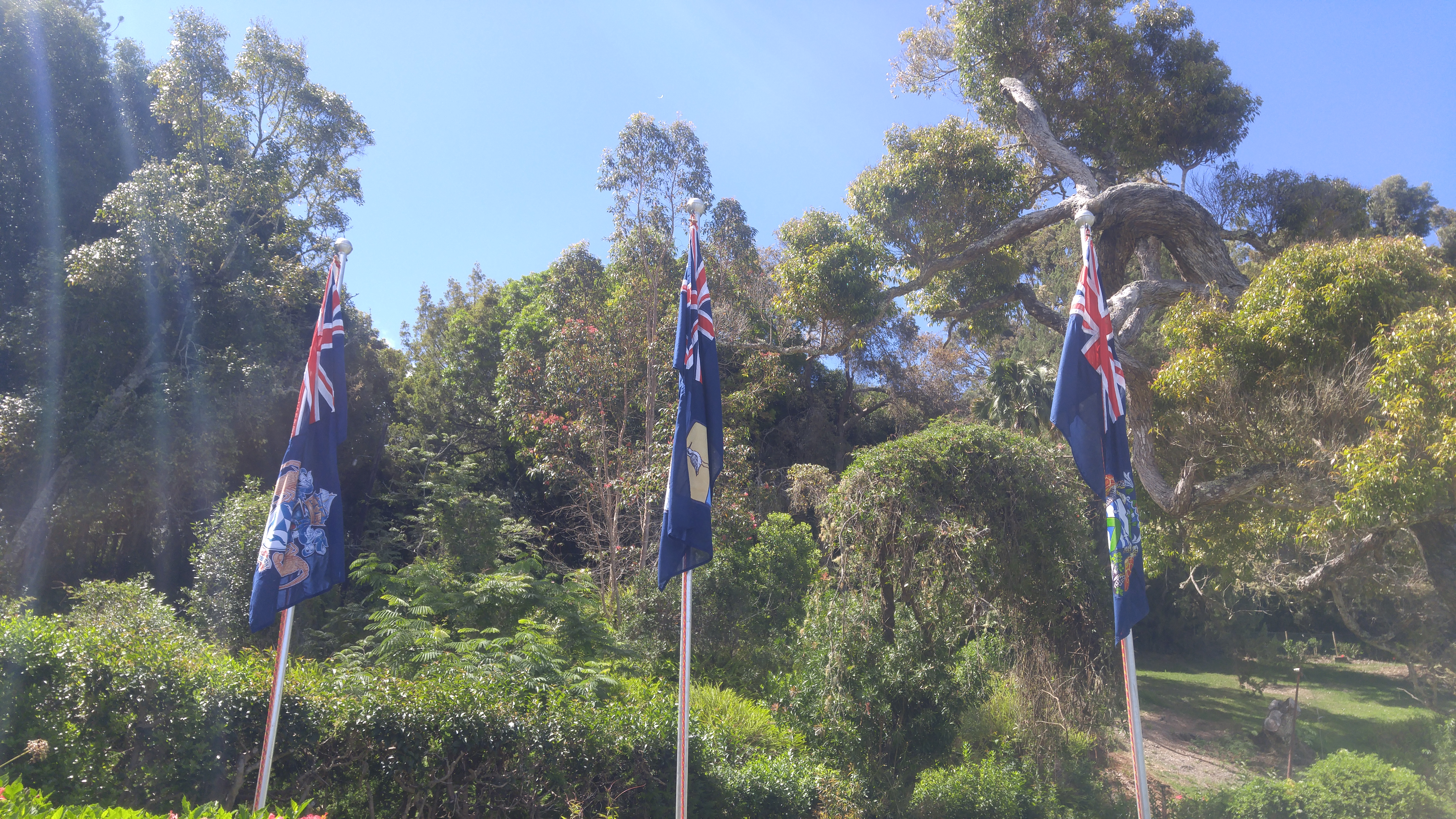
Flags of Saint Helena, Ascension and Tristan da Cunha at Plantation House, Saint Helena

Saint Helena, Ascension and Tristan da Cunha, a British Overseas Territory, does not have its own flag; however, the three administrative divisions do have their own flags:

== Administrative divisions flags ==
=== Saint Helena ===
Flag	Date	Use	Description
	2019–present	Flag of Saint Helena	A British Blue Ensign with the Union Flag in the canton and the coat of arms in the fly

=== Ascension Island ===
Flag	Date	Use	Description
	2013–present	Flag of Ascension Island	A British Blue Ensign with the Union Flag in the canton and the coat of arms in the fly

=== Tristan da Cunha ===
Flag	Date	Use	Description
	2002–present	Flag of Tristan da Cunha	A British Blue Ensign with the Union Flag in the canton and the coat of arms in the fly

== Governor's and Administrator's flags ==
=== Saint Helena ===
Flag	Date	Use	Description
	2019–present	Flag of the Governor	A Union Flag defaced with the Island's coat of arms

=== Tristan da Cunha ===
Flag	Date	Use	Description
	2002–present	Flag of the Administrator	A Union Flag defaced with the Island's coat of arms

== Historical ==
=== Saint Helena ===
Flag	Date	Use	Description
	1874–1985	Flag of Saint Helena	A British Blue Ensign with the Union Flag in the canton and the colonial seal in the fly
	1874–1985	Flag of the Governor of Saint Helena	A Union Flag defaced with the colonial seal
	1985–2019	Flag of Saint Helena	A British Blue Ensign with the Union Flag in the canton and the coat of arms in the fly
	1985–1999	Flag of the Governor of Saint Helena	A Union Flag defaced with the Island's coat of arms

=== Ascension Island ===
Flag	Date	Use	Description
	–2013	De facto flag of Ascension Island	The Union Flag
