= Flag of Tristan da Cunha =

Tristan da Cunha
- Flag of Tristan da Cunha
- Use: Civil and state flag, state ensign
- Proportion: 1:2
- Adopted: 20 October 2002; 24 years ago
- Design: Blue Ensign with the coat-of-arms of Flag of Tristan da Cunha in the fly.

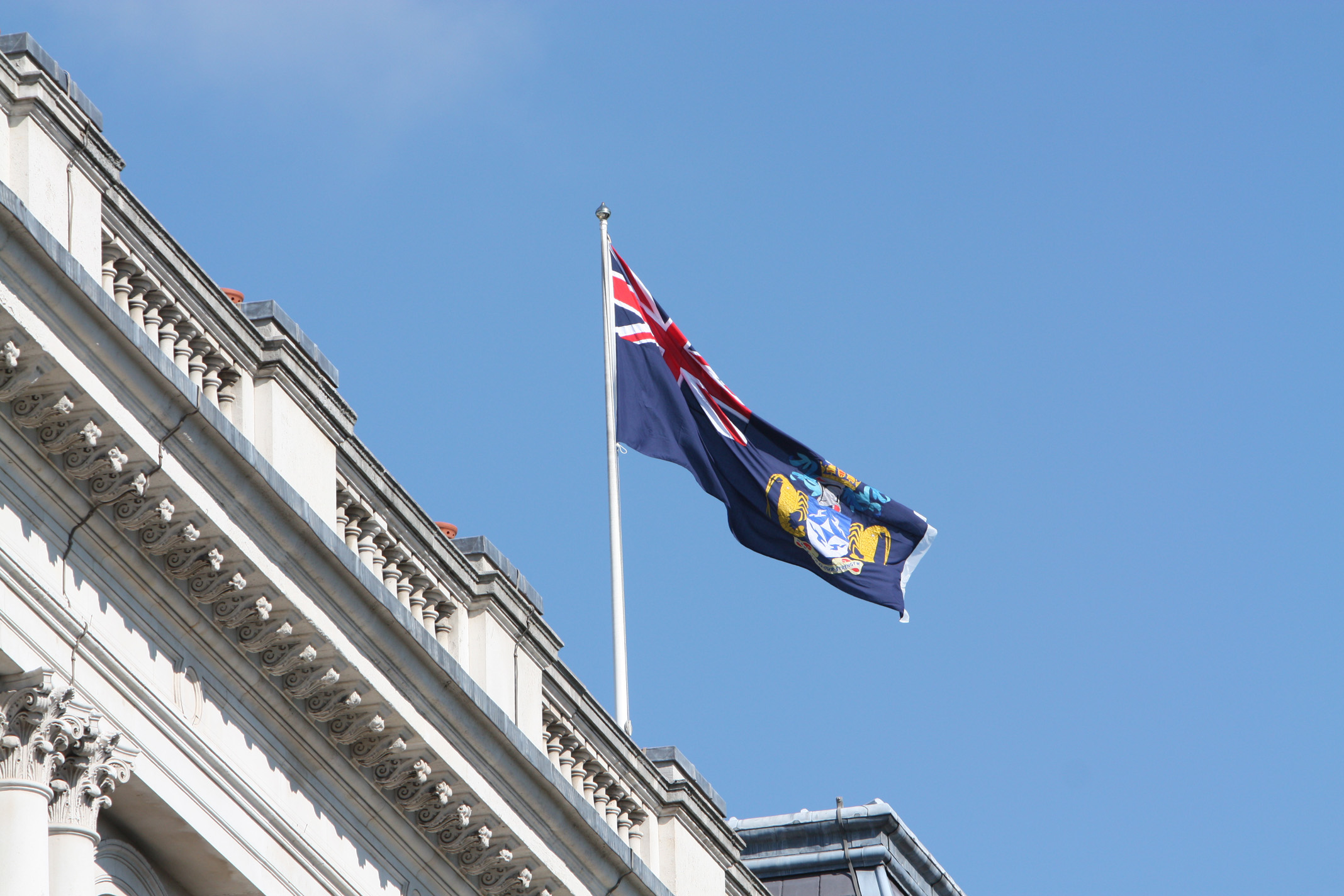
Flag of Tristan da Cunha flying above the Foreign, Commonwealth and Development Office, London

The flag of Tristan da Cunha was adopted on 20 October 2002, in a proclamation made by the Governor of Saint Helena under a Royal Warrant granted by Queen Elizabeth II.

The flag is a Blue Ensign design, defaced with the coat of arms of Tristan da Cunha — a Tristan longboat above a Naval Crown, with a central shield decorated with four yellow-nosed albatross and flanked by two Tristan rock lobsters. Below this, there is a scroll with the territory's motto, Our faith is our strength.

== Design ==
Similar to other flags of British Overseas Territories, such as the other countries in the dependency of Saint Helena, Ascension and Tristan da Cunha, the flag is blue, with a Union Jack in the canton and a coat of arms on the fly. As with the flags of other British Overseas Territories, it is in a 1:2 ratio.

The coat of arms features a shield bearing four albatrosses in a blue-and-white mirror image design. The central diamond-shaped charge is based on a charge from the arms of the da Cunha family to which Admiral Tristão da Cunha belonged, after whom the island is named: "cunha" in Portuguese means "wedge", and blue wedges feature in the da Cunha arms as a canting charge. The two supporters are Tristan rock lobsters, which are found in the waters surrounding the island. The crest on the closed or tilting helm(of the Da Cunha family of esquires), features a naval crown and a Tristan da Cunha longboat. The motto is “Our faith is our strength”.

=== Colours ===
==== British colours ====
Scheme	Blue	Red	White
Refs.			
Pantone (paper)	280 C	186 C	Safe
HEX	#012169	#C8102E	#FFFFFF
MoD	8711D	8711	8711J
NSN	8305.99.130.4580	8305.99.130.4584	8305.99.130.4585
CMYK	100.85.5.22	2.100.85.6	0.0.0.0
RGB	1, 33, 105	200, 16, 46	255, 255, 255

== History ==
Flag of Saint Helena and Tristan da Cunha from 1874-1985

The flag of the Administrator of Tristan da Cunha, made official in 2002 along with the national flag.

In 1874, Saint Helena was accorded its own badge that was eventually utilised on its flag. This consisted of a depiction of the territory's rocky coastline and an East Indiaman. The badge was later redesigned in 1984, with the Saint Helena plover added to the upper portion. Although this change was publicised in the island's government gazette in January of that year, authorisation was only granted by the Admiralty a decade later in 1994.

The territory's flag was also utilised as the official flag of Tristan da Cunha, as well as on Ascension Island in an unofficial capacity. This continued until the two islands adopted their own distinct flags in 2002 and 2013, respectively.

On 20th October 2002, Tristan da Cunha adopted its own coat of arms and put it on a blue design with Union Jack to form its own flag. (Prior to this, Tristan had used the Coat of arms of Saint Helena, originally adopted in 1984.) It officially became a flag the same year, but did not receive widespread recognition until it was used during a state visit by the Governor of Tristan da Cunha to the United Kingdom. (On the same day as the flag became official, the Governor also was given an official flag, which consisted of a Union Jack with the Tristan da Cunha coat of arms in the middle of it. The coat of arms features a longboat, which is a part of day-to-day life for islanders, positioned above a naval crown. The blue diamond on the shield is taken from the family coat of arms of the Cunha family, of whom Tristão da Cunha, the discoverer and namesake of the island, was a member. The rock lobsters on the sides are Jasus paulensis, also known as Tristan Rock Lobster, which live by the island.

== Usage ==
Use of the flag is not common on the island, though it is draped outside the Albatross bar, the only pub on the island. It is also often flown when boats arrive in the harbour, or during special events such as the King's Birthday.

=== Administrator's flag ===
The official website of the Governor of Tristan da Cunha suggests it be used, "in the presence of the Administrator, or acting Administrator, on land and at sea.".

== Other flags ==
The flag of the Administrator of Tristan da Cunha, made official in 2002 along with the national flag.

Flag of Saint Helena

Flag of Ascension Island

== See also ==
- Coat of arms of Tristan da Cunha
- Flag of Saint Helena
- Flag of Ascension Island
