= Coat of arms of Saint Helena, Ascension and Tristan da Cunha =

Saint Helena, Ascension and Tristan da Cunha, a British Overseas Territory, does not have its own coat of arms; instead, the three administrative regions have their own symbols, respectively, as discussed in the following articles:

- Coat of arms of Saint Helena
- Coat of arms of Ascension Island
- Coat of arms of Tristan da Cunha
- Royal coat of arms of the United Kingdom, especially the version used by British government, is the only arms that has official status across the entire territory.
