= Coat of arms of South Georgia and the South Sandwich Islands =

Heraldic emblem of the territory

- Crest: A reindeer
- Shield: Lozengy argent and azure, on a pile vert a lion rampant or, armed and langued gules, holding a torch or, inflamed gules, and in chief two estoiles or
- Supporters: A fur seal and a macaroni penguin
- Motto: Leo Terram Propriam Protegat ('Let the lion protect its own land')

The coat of arms of South Georgia and the South Sandwich Islands is the coat of arms which represents the British Overseas Territory in the Atlantic Ocean. A coat of arms was first granted to the territory in 1985, upon the creation of the territory. Prior to 1985, South Georgia and the South Sandwich Islands were a dependency of the Falkland Islands, and used their coat of arms. Prior to 1962, the British Antarctic Territories were also included in the area previously included in the Falkland Islands, and thus also used the same coat of arms. The current coat of arms was granted in 1992.

== Design ==
The arms consist of a green shield containing a golden lion rampant holding a torch, representing the United Kingdom and discovery, together with two golden stars taken from the arms of explorer James Cook who discovered the islands in 1775. The background of the shield is blue and white lozenges. The supporters are an Antarctic fur seal standing on a mountain, and a macaroni penguin standing on ice, both animals native to the islands. The crest is a reindeer, from the two herds of reindeer found on South Georgia Island. The original seal granted in 1985 on the creation of the territory consisted just of the central shield. The arms were later augmented on 14 February 1992 by Royal Warrant, to celebrate the liberation of the Falklands from Argentine occupation.

The motto is Leo Terram Propriam Protegat (Latin: "[Let the] Lion protect his own land").

The coat of arms is used in the flying of the flag of South Georgia and the South Sandwich Islands, and as a crest in the defaced Union Flag of the Civil Commissioner.

In 2015, the Treasury of the South Georgia and South Sandwich Islands produced a coin bearing the coat of arms to celebrate 30 years since they were granted a crest.

== See also ==
- List of coats of arms of the United Kingdom and dependencies

== Sources ==
- Heraldry of the World: South Georgia and the South Sandwich Islands
