= Australian Border Force Flag =

Australian Border Force Flag

The Australian Border Force Flag is the flag flown by Australian Border Force vessels and sometimes on ABF buildings. Any vessel acting in a customs capacity must fly this flag. The current version is an Australian National Flag with the words "AUSTRALIAN BORDER FORCE" added in bold between the Commonwealth Star and the lower part of the Southern Cross. This flag was adopted by regulations coming into force on 1 July 2015.

== History ==
=== Colonial customs flags ===
English law has required customs vessels to fly a distinctive flag since at least 1784. The earliest recorded Customs flag in Australia is the New South Wales Customs House Ensign of 1832, which included in the Code of Signals for the Colony of New South Wales in the NSW Calendar and Post Office Directory for that year. The flag was a British Red Ensign, defaced with a gold crown over the letters CH in the fly.

A later New South Wales Customs Colonial Flag was described by a regulation published in the Supplement to the NSW Government Gazette, No. 193, Friday, 12 May 1882:

"The proper ensign for Customs shall be the red English ensign with the addition of a white cross, being in the form and proportion the same as the white ensign, but with the colours of the flag reversed, and with the letters CH in the outer lower quarter of the flag; and the pendant shall be the red pendant."

1832

1882

=== Commonwealth customs flags ===
The Customs Act 1901 was passed soon after federation, and like previous British and colonial legislation, required the use of a customs flag. The first flag appointed under this act was specified in Section 14 of the Customs Regulations, which were gazetted on 1 October 1901 in the Commonwealth of Australia Gazette No. 53, page 172:

"The Customs flag shall be the Blue Ensign,

with the addition in the fly of the letters "HMC" in bold

character, and the word 'Australia'".

In 1903, the flag was changed from a defaced British blue ensign, to a defaced Australian blue ensign. An order in Council, dated 16 June 1904, notes that the word "AUSTRALIA" was also removed from the flag. The flag changed again when the Commonwealth star of the national flag gained an extra point in 1908.

The text "HMC" was changed to the word "CUSTOMS" by amendment SR297, published 17 December 1987 and commencing 1 January 1988. When customs functions were taken over by the newly created Australian Border Force on 1 July 2015, the Customs Regulations were changed to replace "CUSTOMS" with "AUSTRALIAN BORDER FORCE". However, on 17 July 2015, the flag seen flying at an ABF building did not contain the word "AUSTRALIAN".

1901-1903

1903-1904

1904-1909

1909-1988

1988-2015

Used in 2015

2015-present
