= Coat of arms of Montserrat =

- Adopted: 10 April 1909 (part of the coat of arms of the British Leeward Islands); 1962 (Crown colony)

The coat of arms of Montserrat consists of an escutcheon (shield) charged with a woman in a green dress holding a golden harp and a black cross. In use since at least 1909, it has been the official coat of arms of the Caribbean island of Montserrat since the island became a British Crown colony in 1962. The escutcheon is featured on the flag of the territory. The coat of arms of Montserrat is a prime example of British influence on Caribbean heraldry.

== History ==
Montserrat was first sighted and named by Christopher Columbus in November 1493, during his second journey to the West Indies. It became a colony of the Kingdom of England in 1632, when Thomas Warner – the first governor of Saint Christopher – sent Irish Catholics from his territory to Montserrat. Other Irish settlers from the Colony of Virginia consequently moved to the island. Sovereignty over Montserrat changed hands between the French and the British throughout the 17th and 18th centuries. This continued until 1783, when the Peace of Paris saw France permanently relinquish the island to the United Kingdom.

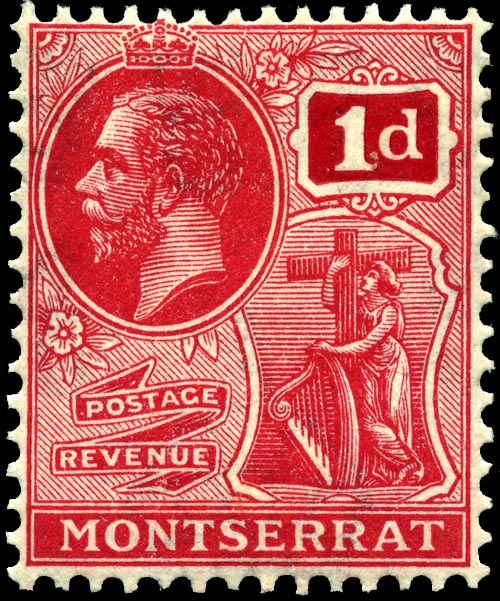
1929 stamp with the arms

Montserrat joined the British Leeward Islands federation in 1871. A Royal Warrant was issued on 10 April 1909 granting the island its own shield, along with Antigua, Dominica, Saint Kitts and Nevis, and the Virgin Islands. The shields of each of these territories formed part of the coat of arms of the British Leeward Islands. The Leeward Islands federation was dissolved on 1 July 1956 and Montserrat joined the West Indies Federation when it was created two years later. Montserratians ratified the territory's constitution in 1960, and the island became a separate crown colony in 1962. It consequently adopted the shield from 1909 as its new coat of arms.

Coat of arms of the British Leeward Islands (1909–1940)

Coat of arms of the British Leeward Islands (1940–1956)

== Design ==
=== Symbolism ===
The colours and objects on the coat of arms carry cultural, political, and regional meanings. The woman wearing a green dress is Erin, the national personification of Ireland. The Celtic harp she is clutching is another representation of that country. Both these symbols allude to the Irish settlers who immigrated to Montserrat from 1632 onwards. The first census conducted in the British Leeward Islands in 1678 found that 70% of the island's white residents claimed Irish ancestry, marking the highest concentration of Irish inhabitants in the federation. The cross recognises the Christian heritage of the island, (Note: The World Factbook estimates that 67.1% of Montserratians were Protestant and 11.6% were Roman Catholic in 2001.) while the woman's embrace of it symbolises the Montserratians' love of Christ.

=== Uses ===
The shield from the arms features on the flag of Montserrat, and on the standard of the territory's governor.

== See also ==
- List of coats of arms of the United Kingdom and dependencies
