= Armorial of railways in Great Britain =

Coat of arms and emblems of railways in Great Britain

Railways in Great Britain have a spotted history with heraldry. Though there are some examples of railway companies acquiring legitimate grants of arms from either the College of Arms or the Lyon Court, the majority of emblems simply copied the existing arms of the municipalities between which their routes ran, or used haphazard collections of quasi-heraldic imagery. Many encircled their insignia with buckles resembling those of orders of chivalry, such as that of the Order of the Garter, but with the name of the company in place of those orders' mottoes. Earlier railway companies frequently employed circular pictorial seals which occasionally included shields, crests or other elements from civic arms.

== Post-privatisation (1994-present) ==
| Arms | Name of Railway (including common initialism, if any) and heraldic description (blazon) |
|---|---|
| | The Great North Eastern Railway, owned by Sea Containers Ltd and operating the InterCity East Coast franchise 1996-2007. |

== British Railways (1948-1997) ==
| Arms | Name of Railway (including common initialism, if any) and heraldic description (blazon) |
|---|---|
| | The British Railways Board Escutcheon: Vert, on a fess double-cottised Argent between in chief three railway wheels of the last and in base a portcullis also Argent two barrulets wary Azure. Crest: On a wreath Argent and Vert, a demi lion Gules holding between the paws a railway wheel Argent. Supporters: On either side a lion guardant Gules charged on the shoulder with a railway wheel Argent. Motto: Velociter Et Securiter |
| | The "ferret and dartboard" heraldic device registered with both the College of Arms and the Lyon Court. Used from 1956-68. Initially transfers were made of the lion facing both directions, but the College later insisted it must always face left. The device is a modified version of the crest of the British Railways Board, with the lion issuant from a gold heraldic crown composed of a rose, (for England) a thistle (for Scotland), a leek (for Wales) and an oak leaf (representing all Great Britain). Blazon: Issuant from a crown composed of a rose a thistle a leek and an oak leaf Or a demi lion Gules holding between the paws a railway wheel Argent. |
| | The "cyling lion" totem used from 1949-1956. It was not a registered heraldic device. Transfers were made of the lion facing both ways to always look to the front of the locomotive. |
| | The "flying sausage" used immediately after nationalisation and on station signage until the 1960s. |

== The Big Four (1923-1947) ==
| Arms | Name of Railway (including common initialism, if any) and heraldic description (blazon) |
|---|---|
| | Great Western Railway (GWR) Dexter the arms, crest and motto of the City of London, sinister the arms, crest and motto of Bristol City Council. Escutcheons: London: Argent a cross Gules in the first quarter a sword in pale point upwards of the last.; Bristol: Gules on the sinister side a castle with two towers domed all argent on each dome a banner charged with the Cross of St. George the castle on a mount Vert the dexter base water Proper thereon a ship of three masts Or the rigging Sable sailing from a port in the dexter tower her fore and main masts being visible and on each a round top of the fifth on the foremast a sail set and on the mainmast a sail furled of the second.; Crests: London: On a wreath Argent and Gules, a dragon's sinister wing Argent charged on the underside with a cross throughout Gules.; Bristol: On a wreath Or and Gules issuant from clouds two Arms embowed and interlaced in saltire Proper the dexter hand holding a serpent Vert and the sinister holding a pair of scales Or.; Mottoes: London: Domine Dirige Nos; Bristol: Virtute Et Industria |
| | London and North Eastern Railway (LNER) The railway obtained a grant of arms in 1924. Escutcheon: Quarterly 1st & 4th a London griffin 2nd a Tudor rose 3rd a Scottish thistle all Proper over all a cross Gules charged with four York lions in cross and a representation of Edinburgh castle in the centre. Crest: The figure of Mercury emerging from clouds. Motto: Forward |
| | London, Midland and Scottish Railway (LMS) Blazon: On a wreath Argent and Gules a dragon wing Vert charged with a cross Gules. In dexter base two roses Gules slipped and leaved bendwise Vert and in sinister base two thistles slipped and leaved bendwise sinister Proper the two conjoined by a bow of ribbon Gules. |
| | Southern Railway (SR) Escutcheon: Barry wavy of eight Argent and Azure four escutcheons in cross Argent that in chief charged with a sword erect Gules that in dexter a rose Gules barbed and seeded Proper that in sinister a torteaux thereon a leopard's face Or that in base a seahorse naiant Sable. Crest: In front of a demi-sun Or a wheel Azure winged Argent struck through with a lightning bolt bendwise sinister Gules. Supporters: Dexter a dragon Gules sinister a horse Argent each resting its interior hindpaw upon a wheel Azure. |

== Pre-grouping (1830-1922) ==
| Arms | Name of Railway (including common initialism, if any) and heraldic description (blazon) |
|---|---|
| | Barry Railway |
| | Blaydon, Gateshead and Hebburn Railway |
| | Bluebell Railway Escutcheon: Quarterly 1st Ermine on a chief Gules a demi-lion rampant issuant Or (The Earl of Sheffield), 2nd chequy Argent and Azure on a sinister canton of the first a lion rampant of the second between eight cross crosslets Sable (the town of Lewes), 3rd the town of East Grinstead and 4th the Lords of the Manor of Horsted Keynes. Motto: Floreat Vapor (Let Steam Flourish) |
| | Blyth and Tyne Railway |
| | Brandling Junction Railway |
| | Caledonian Railway (CR) The arms of the Kingdom of Scotland. Escutcheon: Or a lion rampant Gules armed and langued Azure within a double tressure flory-counter-flory of the second. Crest: Upon the royal helm the crown of Scotland Proper, thereon a lion sejant affronté Gules armed and langued Azure royally crowned Proper holding in his dexter paw a sword and in his sinister a sceptre both Proper. Supporters: Two unicorns Argent royally crowned Proper armed crined and unguled Or each gorged with a coronet of the second composed of crosses patée and fleurs de lis a chain affixed thereto passing between the forelegs and reflexed over the back also of the second. Sinister holding the standard of Saint Andrew dexter holding the banner of the royal arms. Motto: In Defens, Nemo me impune lacessit, Caledonian Railway Company |
| | Cornwall Railway The arms of the Duchy of Cornwall - Sable fifteen bezants five four three two and one Or. |
| | Clarence Railway |
| | Cleveland Railway |
| | Cranbrook and Paddock Wood Railway |
| | Eden Valley Railway |
| | Ffestiniog Railway |
| | Glasgow and South Western Railway (GSWR) |
| | Great Central Railway; Arms granted 25 February 1898 Escutcheon: Argent on a cross Gules voided of the field between two wings in chief Sable and as many daggers erect in base of the second in the fess point a morion winged of the third on a chief also of the second a pale of the first thereon eight arrows saltirewise banded also of the third between on the dexter side three bendlets enhanced and on the sinister a fleur-de-lis Or. Crest: A representation of the front of a locomotive engine Proper between two wings Or. |
| | Great Eastern Railway The arms of Maldon - Party per pale Azure and Argent on the dexter side three lions passant guardant in pale Or and on the sinister on waves of the sea in base Proper a ship of one mast Sable the mast surmounted by a fleur-de-lis Gold and from the masthead a pennon flotant Gules the sail furled Argent and from a turret at the stern a flagstaff erect surmounted by a fleur-de-lis of the sixth and therefrom a banner of the first charged with three lions passant guardant of the third. The arms of Ipswich - Party per pale gules and azure, on the dexter side, a lion rampant guardant or, and on the sinister three demi-hulks of ships of the same conjoined to the impalement line. The arms of Norwich - Gules a castle domed Argent in base a lion passant guardant Or. The arms of Cambridge - Gules a bridge throughout fesseways surmounted by three towers in chief a fleur-de-lis Or between two roses Argent the base barry wavy Argent and Azure thereon three ships each with one mast and yardarm and sail furled Sable. The arms of Hertford - Argent a hart lodged resting on water Proper. The arms of Northampton - Gules on a mount Vert a tower triple towered in a pyramidical form Argent and supported by two lions rampant guardant Or in the portway of the tower a portcullis. The arms of Huntingdon - A landscape, in the centre of which is a tree on the dexter side of which is a bird perched on the sinister side of the tree is a huntsman (supposed to represent Robin Hood) blowing a horn in his sinister hand a bow and arrow on the dexter side a stag courant pursued by two dogs all Proper. The arms of Middlesex - Gules three seaxes fessewise points to the sinister Proper in the centre chief point a Saxon Crown. The arms of London - Argent a cross Gules in the first quarter a sword in pale point upwards of the last. |
| | Hartlepool Dock and Railway |
| | Highland Railway |
| | Hull and Barnsley Railway The arms of Kingston-upon-Hull - Azure three Ducal Coronets in pale Or. The arms of Barnsley - Argent on a chevron Gules between two shuttles fessewise in chief and in base as many pickaxes in saltire Proper a falcon wings elevated and holding in the dexter claw a padlock Or between two boar's heads couped of the last each holding in the mouth a cross patee fitchee in pale of the first a chief Sable thereon a cross patee between two covered cups all within a bordure embattled Or. |
| | Hull and Selby Railway |
| | Lancashire and Yorkshire Railway (L&YR) Dexter the shield of the City of Lancaster 1907-1974 (Per fess Azure and Gules in chief a Fleur-de-Lis and in base a Lion passant guardant Or.) sinister the shield of the City of York (Argent on a Cross Gules five Lions passant guardant Or.). In chief St Edward's Crown Proper and in base two roses dexter Gules sinister Argent their leaves and slips conjoined Vert. |
| | Launceston and South Devon Railway The arms of Plymouth - Argent a saltire Vert between four towers Sable. The arms of Launceston - Gules a triple circular tower in a pyramidical form Or all within a bordure Azure charged with eight towers domed of the second. |
| | Leeds Northern Railway |
| | London and Birmingham Railway |
| | London and North Western Railway (LNWR) |
| | London and South Western Railway (LSWR) The arms of London - Argent a cross Gules in the first quarter a sword in pale point upwards of the last. The arms of Salisbury - Barry of eight Azure and Or. The arms of Winchester - Gules five castles in saltire Argent the centre castle supported by two lions passant guardant Or. The arms of Southampton - Party per fesse Gules and Argent three roses counterchanged. The arms of Portsmouth - Azure a crescent Or surmounted by an estoile of the last. |
| | London, Brighton and South Coast Railway (LBSCR) The arms of London - Argent a cross Gules in the first quarter a sword in pale point upwards of the last. The arms of Brighton - Argent, two dolphins naiant sable, a bordure azure charged with six martlets Or. The arms of the Cinque Ports - Per pale gules and azure, three lions passant guardant dimidiated and conjoined to the hulks of as many ancient ships, all in pale Or. The arms of Portsmouth - Azure a Crescent ensigned by an Estoile of eight points Or. |
| | London, Chatham and Dover Railway (LCDR) The arms of London - Argent a cross Gules in the first quarter a sword in pale point upwards of the last. The arms of Kent - Gules a Horse forcene Argent. Motto: Invicta |
| | London Necropolis Railway |
| | Metropolitan Railway The arms of London - Argent a cross Gules in the first quarter a sword in pale point upwards of the last. The arms of Middlesex - Gules three seaxes fessewise points to the sinister Proper in the centre chief point a Saxon Crown. |
| | Midland and Great Northern Joint Railway |
| | Midland Railway Escutcheon: 1st Birmingham (quarterly first and fourth Azure a bend of five lozenges Or second and third per pale indented of the last and Gules over all a fess Ermine thereon a mural crown of the second) 2nd Derby (Argent on a mount Vert a stag lodged all within park-pales and a gate all Proper) 3rd Bristol (Gules on the sinister side a castle with two towers domed all Argent on each dome a banner charged with the cross of St George the castle on a mount Vert the dexter base water Proper thereon a ship of three masts Or sailing from a port in the dexter tower her fore and main masts being visible Sable the rigging of the last and on each a round top of the fifth on the foremast a sail set and on the main-mast a sail furled of the second) 4th Leicester (Gules a cinquefoil pierced Ermine) 5th Lincoln (Argent on a cross Gules a fleur-de-lis Or) 6th Leeds (Azure a fleece Or on a chief Sable three mullets Argent); Crest: The wyvern of Mercia. |
| | North British Railway |
| | North Eastern Railway Incorporating the heraldic devices of three predecessor railway companies. In chief - York; In dexter base - Leeds Northern; In sinister base - quarterly 1st & 4th York, 2nd Newcastle 3rd Berwick. |
| | North Staffordshire Railway (NSR) The arms of Stafford - Gules a quadrangular castle in perspective the four towers domed Argent and each surmounted by a pennon Or between in chief two Stafford knots and in base a lion passant guardant of the last. |
| | North Yorkshire and Cleveland Railway |
| | Rhymney Railway In chief - an Egyptian-style furnace, a colliery and a ship. (Note: The coat of arms has an interesting history; taken from the common seal of the company, according to the minutes taken at the first Board Meeting it was decided that it should be arranged as follows: Cardiff arms to the lower right of the seal, Newport arms to the lower left, surmounted by a vignette representing furnaces in the Egyptian style of architecture (this type of furnace was in use in the Rhymney Iron Works in 1828), a colliery on the right, and a ship to the left, to indicate the two terminals of the line. However, the engraver must have misunderstood the intention, for he placed on the left the seal that should have been on the right, and the colours of the Cardiff coat of arms are incorrect, as the chevrons should be gold. The placing of Newport on the shield is a mystery as the Rhymney Railway never went there.) The arms of Newport - Or a chevron reversed Gules. The arms of Cardiff - Or tree chevronels in pale Gules. |
| | Scarborough and Whitby Railway The seal of Scarborough - A ship, a watchtower and a star. The arms of Whitby - Azure three shells Proper. |
| | Somerset and Dorset Joint Railway The arms of Dorchester (county town of Dorset) - A castle triple-towered upon a mount and in front of the castle an escutcheon quarterly 1st & 4th France and England grandquarterly 2nd Scotland 3rd Ireland. |
| | South Durham and Lancashire Union Railway |
| | South Eastern and Chatham Railway (SE&CR) |
| | Stockton and Darlington Railway Adopted by a committee of the board of directors on 25 May 1821 - a horse drawing four wagons. Motto: Periculum Privatum Utilitas Publica (At Private Risk For Public Service) |
| | Taff Vale Railway The arms of Llywelyn the Great - Quarterly Or and Gules four lions passant guardant counterchanged. |
| | Talyllyn Railway |
| | West Hartlepool Harbour and Railway |
| | West Somerset Railway |
| | York, Newcastle and Berwick Railway The arms of York - Argent on a cross Gules five lions passant guardant Or. The arms of Newcastle-upon-Tyne - Gules three towers triple-towered Argent. The arms of Berwick - Argent on a mount a bear standing against a tree all Proper the bear collared and chained Or in fess two escutcheons on each the arms of France and England quarterly on a chief Argent a king crowned and habited Or holding in his dexter hand a mount and in the sinister a sceptre Gold. |

== Notable individuals ==
| Arms | Name and heraldic description (blazon) |
|---|---|
| | Brian Robertson, 1st Baron Robertson of Oakridge, Chairman of the British Transport Commission 1953-61 Escutcheon: Gules two swords in saltire Argent hilted and pommelled Gold the points downwards between in chief a sun in splendour in base a fleur-de-lis Or and in fess two Wolves' Heads erased of the second. Crest: Issuant from a coronet of fleur-de-lis Or a demi wolf Argent gorged with an Eastern Crown Gold supporting with the dexter paw a lance Proper thereon a pennon per fess Gules and Argent. Supporters: Dexter a Grey Charger in review order sinister a springbok both Proper; Motto: Fight The Good Fight |
| | Richard Beeching, Baron Beeching, Chairman of the British Railways Board 1963-5 Escutcheon: Gules on a bend double cotised Or three beech leaves Vert a chief Ermine. Crest: A cubit arm erect vested Sable cuffed Argent the hand Proper supporting a sword sheathed point upwards Gules hilt pommel quillons and chape Or and grasping two arrows in saltire points upward Or all between two branches of beech Proper. Supporters: On either side a lion that to the dexter Gules the sinister Or each charged on the shoulder with an annulet enclosing two bars wavy counter-changed and resting the interior hind paw on a rock Proper. Motto: Straight Down The Middle |
| | Richard Marsh, Baron Marsh, Chairman of the British Railways Board 1971-6 Escutcheon: Argent four pallets wavy Azure on a chevron over all Gules a leopard's face between two keys wards upwards and outwards Or on a chief Gules a double warded key wards upwards between two leopard's faces Gold. Crest: Upon a mount Vert a bear sejant upon its haunches and erect Or holding between its forepaws a mitra peciosa Gold panelled Vert garnished and lined Gules the infulae Vert and fringed at their ends Gold. Supporters: On either side a Japanese crane (Grus japonensis) Proper the interior wing and leg of each supporting the shield the whole upon a compartment composed of water barry wavy of four Azure and Argent between two banks of marshy ground Proper sprouting therefrom plants of marsh buckler fern marsh mallow and bulrush all slipped and leaved Proper. Motto: Non Est Vivere Sed Valere Vita |
| | Ralph Wedgwood, Chairman of the London & North Eastern Railway 1939-41 |
| | Josiah Stamp, 1st Baron Stamp, Chairman of the London, Midland & Scottish Railway 1927-41 Escutcheon: Gules between two garbs Or three bezants in bend each charged with a horse passant Sable. Crest: Issuant from a mount Vert bezantée a demi-horse Argent. Supporters: On either side a horse Argent resting the interior hind leg on a bezant. Motto: Fidei Commissa Teneo |
| | Gerald Loder, 1st Baron Wakehurst, Chairman of the London, Midland & Scottish Railway 1923-4 Escutcheon: Quarterly: 1st and 4th grandquarters Azure on a Fess between in chief a Portcullis chained and in base a Martlet Or three Stags' Heads caboshed proper (Loder); 2nd grandquarter: the Royal Arms of King Charles II, viz. quarterly 1st and 4th. France and England quarterly; 2nd, Scotland; 3rd, Ireland, and overall a baton sinister Gules charged with three roses Argent barbed and seeded Proper (Beauclerk) 3rd grandquarter per quarter Gules and Or in the first quarter a mullet Argent (de Vere). Crest: A stag's head caboshed transfixed by an Arrow bendwise point downwards all Proper between two escallops Or. Supporters: Dexter a Russian Brown Bear Proper sinister a greyhound Argent gorged with a collar checky of the last and Azure. Motto: Murus Aeneus Conscientia Sana (A Sound Conscience Is A Wall Of Brass) |
| | Charles Lawrence, 1st Baron Lawrence of Kingsgate, Chairman of the London, Midland & Scottish Railway 1923-4 Escutcheon: Ermine on a cross raguly Gules an eastern crown Or on a chief Azure two swords in saltire Proper pommels and hilts Gold between as many leopards’ faces Argent. Crest: Out of an eastern crown Or a cubit arm entwined by a wreath of laurel and holding a dagger all Proper. Supporters: Dexter, an officer of the Guide Cavalry (Irregulars) of the Pathan tribe in the province of Peshawar habited and accoutred Proper. Sinister an officer of the Sikh Irregular cavalry also habited and accoutred Proper. Motto: Be Ready |
| | Sir Nigel Gresley, Chief Mechanical Engineer of the LNER 1923-41 Escutcheon: Vairé Ermine and Gules. Crest: A lion passant Ermine armed langued and collared Gules. Motto: Meliore Fide Quam (More Faithful Than Fortunate); Sir Nigel was an agnate of the Gresley baronets. |
| | Frederick Banbury, 1st Baron Banbury of Southam, Chairman of the GNR Escutcheon: Ermine a cross patée Gules between five mullets of six points each within an annulet three in chief and two in base all of the last. |

== Outside of Great Britain ==
Many railways outside of the UK within the British Empire or on railways owned by British investment had emblems and heraldic devices. Many British-owned lines in India, Ireland, Australia (such as the Victorian Railways), Argentina, and South Africa (such as the Natal Government Railways) had armorial bearings placed on their locomotives, carriages and sometimes station architecture.

| Arms | Name of Railway (including common initialism, if any) and heraldic description (blazon) |
|---|---|
| | Cape Government Railways |
| Arms | Name of Railway (including common initialism, if any) and heraldic description (blazon) |
| | Rhodesia Railways |

== Fictional ==
| Arms | Name of Railway (including common initialism, if any) and heraldic description (blazon) |
|---|---|
| | North Western Railway (NWR), on the Island of Sodor in The Railway Series by Wilbert Awdry. Contained in his concept sketches as displayed at the Narrow Gauge Railway Museum. Escutcheon: Per saltire Azure and Vert two gloves Argent saltirewise in fess a rose of Lancaster Proper in chief Azure a wheel or winged of same dexter Vert a fleece Argent sinister Vert a mattock Argent hafted Or in base Azure three herrings naiant Argent. Motto: Nil Unquam Simile (There's Nothing Quite Like It) |
