= Coat of arms of the Cayman Islands =

- Armiger: Cayman Islands
- Crest: On a wreath of the colours (Argent and Azure) a pineapple Or, surmounted by a turtle Vert.
- Torse: Argent and Azure
- Shield: Barry wavy of six Argent and Azure, overall three mullets Vert fimbriated Or two and one, upon a chief wavy Gules a lion passant guardant Or, armed and langued Azure.
- Motto: He hath founded it upon the seas

The Coat of arms of the Cayman Islands was approved by the Legislative Assembly in 1957, and public input was sought on its design. The Royal Warrant assigning "Armorial Ensigns for the Cayman Islands" was approved by Her Majesty's command on 14 May 1958.

The arms consists of a shield, a crested helm and the motto. Three green stars, representing each of the three inhabited Islands (Grand Cayman, Little Cayman and Cayman Brac), are set in the lower two-thirds of the shield. The stars rest on blue and white wavy bands representing the sea. In the top third of the shield, against a red background, is a gold lion passant guardant (walking with the further forepaw raised and the body seen from the side), representing Britain. Above the shield is a green turtle on a coil of rope. Behind the turtle is a gold pineapple. The turtle represents the seafaring history; the rope, its traditional thatch-rope industry; and the pineapple, its ties with Jamaica.

The islands' motto, He hath founded it upon the seas, is printed at the bottom of the shield. This line, a verse from Psalm 24, Verse 2, acknowledges the territory's Christian heritage, as well as its ties to the sea.

== See also ==
- List of coats of arms of the United Kingdom and dependencies
