= Coat of arms of Saint Helena =

- Adopted: 1984
- Crest: In a naval crown Azure, a demi-figure representing St Helena, from her brow a veil Or, vested Argent, her mantle Azure, holding in the dexter hand a lily and supporting with the other in the crook of her arm a cross raguly proper.
- Shield: Azure, in base waves of the sea proper, thereon an Indiaman rigged Sable, masts and sails furled Or, and flying at the stern the George, heading towards on the dexter side, rising from the sea, two cliffs proper; on a chief Or, a wirebird, also proper.
- Motto: "Loyal and unshakable"

The coat of arms of Saint Helena, part of the British Overseas Territory of Saint Helena, Ascension and Tristan da Cunha, was authorised on 30 January 1984.

The arms feature a shield, with the top third showing the national bird, the Saint Helena plover (Charadrius sanctaehelenae), known locally as the wirebird – stylized, but with its unmistakable head pattern. The bottom two thirds depict a coastal scene of the island, a three-masted sailing ship with the mountainous island to the left. The coastal scene is taken from the colonial seal of the colony and shows the flag of England flying from the ship (when the shield was first introduced in 1874 the flag was a White Ensign).

The motto is Loyal and unshakable. The full coat of arms features, above the shield, a woman holding a cross and a flower. This represents Helena of Constantinople, also known as Saint Helena, after whom the island is named. The cross is shown as Helena is credited with finding the relics of the True Cross (cross upon which Jesus was crucified).

The shield of the arms features on the flag of Saint Helena and the Governor's flag. The local two pound coin has the full coat of arms on its reverse.

== Arms usage by dependencies ==
The arms were also used by Ascension Island and Tristan da Cunha when they were dependencies of Saint Helena before 2009. Tristan da Cunha was granted its own arms in 2002 and Ascension Island was granted its own arms in 2012.

== See also ==
- Coat of arms of Saint Helena, Ascension and Tristan da Cunha
  - Coat of arms of Ascension Island
  - Coat of arms of Tristan da Cunha
- List of coats of arms of the United Kingdom and dependencies
