= Blue Ensign =

British state ensign

- Use: State ensign
- Proportion: 1:2
- Adopted: 1620; 406 years ago (as the flag of the Blue Squadron; 9 July 1864 (as used by vessels authorised by warrant)
- Design: A blue field with the Union occupying one quarter of the field and placed in the canton.

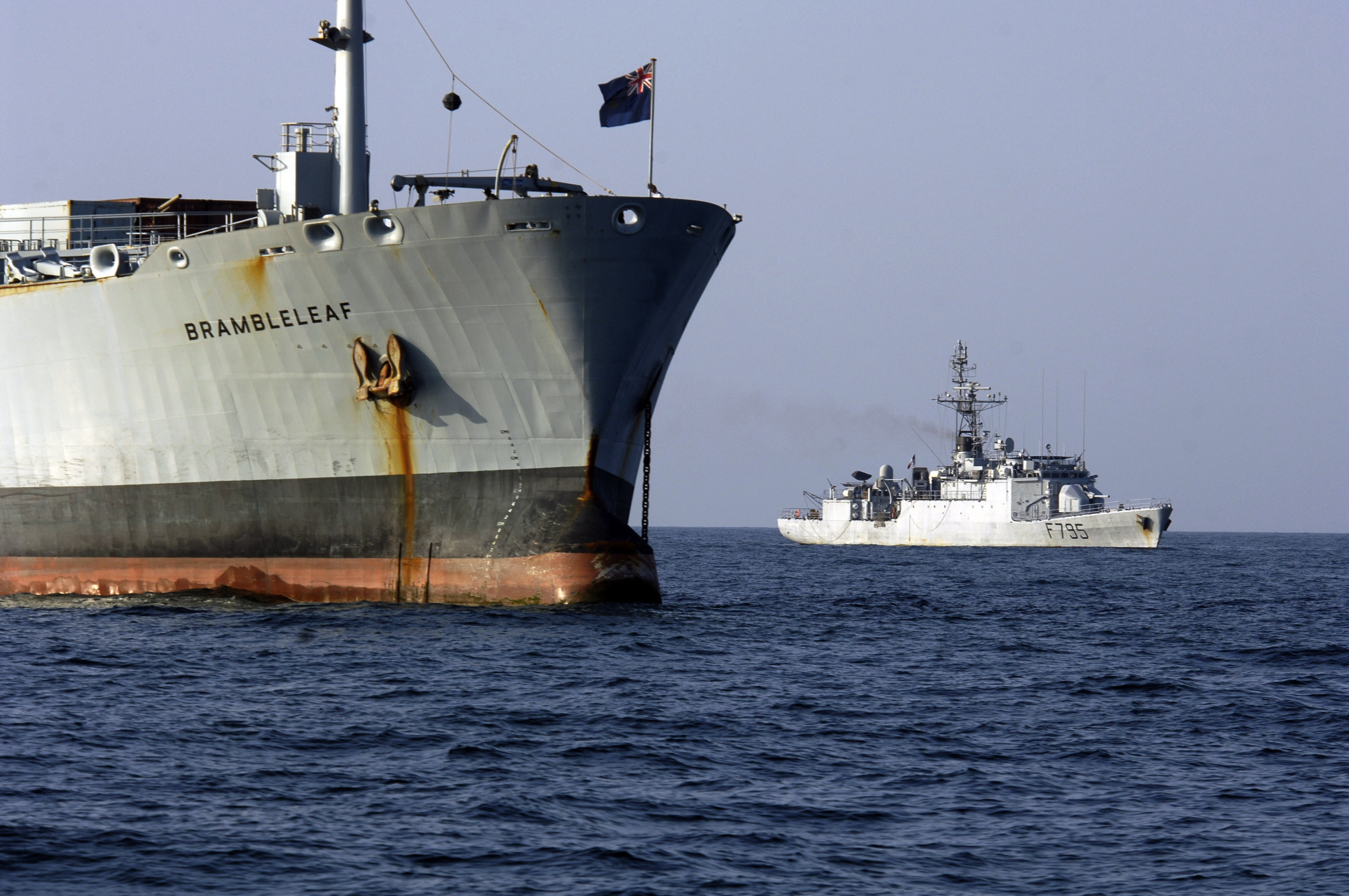
RFA Brambleleaf flying the square Blue Jack based on the Blue Ensign

The Blue Ensign is a British ensign that may be used on vessels by certain authorised yacht clubs, Royal Research Ships and British merchant vessels whose master holds a commission in the Royal Naval Reserve or has otherwise been issued a warrant. Defaced versions with a badge or other emblem are used more broadly; in the United Kingdom by authorised government or private bodies; and internationally by nations or organisations previously a part of the British Empire.

The evolution of the Blue Ensign followed that of the Union Jack. The ensign originated in the 17th century with the St George's Cross (the Flag of England) in the canton, and with a blue field.

The Acts of Union 1707 united England (which included present day Wales) with Scotland in the Kingdom of Great Britain, thus producing a new Blue Ensign with the new Union Flag, containing a saltire, in the canton. With the Act of Union 1800, Ireland became a part of the new United Kingdom of Great Britain and Ireland, and St Patrick's Cross was incorporated into the Union Flag and, accordingly, into the cantons of all British ensigns from 1 January 1801.

English Blue Ensign as it appeared in the seventeenth century

The British Blue Ensign (1707–1801)

The modern Blue Ensign of the United Kingdom

== Plain Blue Ensign ==
The Navy Royal inaugurated squadron colours during the reign of Elizabeth I (1558–1603) to subdivide the English fleet into three squadrons. There were three classes of admirals and differentiated by using coloured flags. There would be three Commanders titled, in order of precedence, as Admiral of the Red Squadron, Admiral of the White Squadron, and Admiral of the Blue Squadron. These were abolished as promotional ranks with the reorganisation of the Royal Navy in 1864.

Prior to the reorganisation of the Royal Navy in 1864, the plain blue ensign had been the ensign of one of three squadrons of the Royal Navy, the Blue Squadron. This changed in 1864, when an order in council provided that the Red Ensign was allocated to merchantmen, the Blue Ensign was to be the flag of ships in public service or commanded by an officer in the Royal Naval Reserve, and the White Ensign was allocated to the Navy.

Thus, since 1864, the plain blue ensign (without any defacement or modification) is permitted to be worn, instead of the Red Ensign, by three categories of civilian vessel:

1. British merchant vessels whose officers and crew include a certain number of retired Royal Navy personnel or Royal Naval Reservists, or are commanded by an officer of the Royal Naval Reserve in possession of a Government warrant. The number and rank of such crew members required has varied over the years, as have the additional conditions required, since the system was first introduced in 1864.
2. Royal Research Ships by warrant (Note: An individual warrant is issued by the Secretary of State for Defence for each ship) whether crewed by former Royal Navy personnel or Merchant Navy personnel.
3. British-registered yachts belonging to members of the following yacht clubs:
- Hornet Services Sailing Club
- Royal Naval Club and Royal Albert Yacht Club
- Royal Brighton Yacht Club, Victoria
- Royal British Virgin Islands Yacht Club
- Royal Cinque Ports Yacht Club
- Royal Cruising Club
- Royal Dorset Yacht Club
- Royal Engineer Yacht Club
- Royal Geelong Yacht Club, Victoria
- Royal Gourock Yacht Club
- Royal Highland Yacht Club
- Royal Marines Sailing Club
- Royal Melbourne Yacht Squadron, Victoria
- Royal Motor Yacht Club
- Royal Naval Sailing Association
- Royal Naval Volunteer Reserve Yacht Club
- Royal New Zealand Yacht Squadron
- Royal Nova Scotia Yacht Squadron
- Royal Perth Yacht Club, Western Australia
- Royal Northern and Clyde Yacht Club
- Royal Port Nicholson Yacht Club, New Zealand
- Royal Queensland Yacht Squadron
- Royal Scottish Motor Yacht Club
- Royal Solent Yacht Club
- Royal South Australia Yacht Squadron
- Royal Southern Yacht Club
- Royal Sydney Yacht Squadron, New South Wales
- Royal Temple Yacht Club
- Royal Thames Yacht Club
- Royal Victorian Motor Yacht Club
- Royal Welsh Yacht Club
- Royal Western Yacht Club of England
- Royal Western Yacht Club of Scotland
- Royal Yacht Club of Tasmania
- Royal Yacht Club of Victoria
- Sussex Motor Yacht Club
- The Cruising Association

Permission for yachts to wear the blue ensign (and other special yachting ensigns) was suspended during both World War I and World War II.

In addition, prior to WWI, a number of ships (in particular, the RMS Lusitania and RMS Mauretania) were listed as Royal Navy Reserve Merchant Vessels, receiving an annual subsidy from the navy and were permitted to fly the blue ensign.

== Defaced Blue Ensign ==
Since 1864, the Blue Ensign is defaced with a badge or emblem, to form the ensign of United Kingdom government departments or public bodies (including British colonial government departments). Current defaced Blue Ensigns (besides yacht clubs listed below) are:

| Aberdeen Harbour Board |
| Border Force |
| British Antarctic Survey |
| British Broadcasting Corporation |
| Combined Cadet Force (Naval Section) |
| Global Marine Systems cable ships |
| Government Service Ensign |
| His Majesty's Army Vessels |
| His Majesty's Coastguard |
| Commissioners of Irish Lights |
| Lloyd's of London |
| Marine Society |
| Mersey Docks and Harbour Company |
| Metropolitan Police |
| Ministry of Defence Police |
| Northern Lighthouse Board |
| Pacific Cables Board |
| Port of London Authority |
| Royal Engineers |
| Royal Fleet Auxiliary Service |
| Royal Hospital School |
| Royal Maritime Auxiliary Service |
| Royal Ulster Constabulary |
| Scottish Fisheries Protection Agency (defunct) |
| Scottish Government Marine Directorate |
| Sea Cadet Corps |
| Welsh Government; Marine and Fisheries Division |

Royal Air Force marine vessels (such as seaplane tenders) flew a defaced blue ensign with an eagle and anchor. Other defaced blue ensigns were previously flown by Cable & Wireless, the Department of Trade & Industry, the General Post Office, the Ministry of Agriculture, Fisheries and Food, the Ministry of War Munitions, the Ocean Weather Service, the Ordnance Board, the Royal Army Service Corps, the Royal Ulster Constabulary and the Submarine Mining Service.

Yachting Blue Ensigns defaced by the badge of the club were recorded in the Navy List until 1985, and now they are administered by the Royal Yachting Association for the Ministry of Defence. Current defaced Blue Ensigns are:

| Aldeburgh Yacht Club |
| Army Sailing Association |
| Bar Yacht Club |
| City Livery Yacht Club |
| HMS Conway |
| Cruising Yacht Club of Australia |
| Household Division Yacht Club |
| Little Ship Club |
| Little Ship Club (Queensland Squadron) |
| Medway Yacht Club |
| Old Worcesters Yacht Club |
| Parkstone Yacht Club |
| Rochester Cruising Yacht Club |
| Royal Air Force Yacht Club |
| Royal Akarana Yacht Club |
| Royal Anglesey Yacht Club |
| Royal Armoured Corps Yacht Club |
| Royal Artillery Yacht Club |
| Royal Australian Navy Sailing Association |
| Royal Bermuda Yacht Club |
| Royal Bombay Yacht Club |
| Royal Burnham Yacht Club |
| Royal Channel Islands Yacht Club |
| Royal Corinthian Yacht Club |
| Royal Cornwall Yacht Club |
| Royal Dee Yacht Club |
| Royal Forth Yacht Club |
| Royal Fresh Water Bay Yacht Club |
| Royal Gibraltar Yacht Club |
| Royal Hamilton Yacht Club |
| Royal Harwich Yacht Club |
| Royal Hong Kong Yacht Club |
| Royal Irish Yacht Club |
| Royal Jamaica Yacht Club |
| Royal London Yacht Club |
| Royal Malta Yacht Club |
| Royal Mersey Yacht Club |
| Royal Motor Yacht Club of New South Wales |
| Royal Nassau Sailing Club |
| Royal Natal Yacht Club |
| Royal North of Ireland Yacht Club |
| Royal Northumberland Yacht Club |
| Royal Ocean Racing Club |
| Royal Plymouth Corinthian Yacht Club |
| Royal Prince Alfred Yacht Club |
| Royal Prince Edward Yacht Club |
| Royal Southampton Yacht Club |
| Royal Suva Yacht Club |
| Royal Torbay Yacht Club |
| Royal Ulster Yacht Club |
| Royal Welsh Yacht Club |
| Royal Yorkshire Yacht Club |
| Severn Motor Yacht Club |
| Sussex Yacht Club |
| Thames Motor Yacht Club |
| The Cruising Association |
| The House of Lords Yacht Club |
| The Poole Harbour Yacht Club |
| The Poole Yacht Club |

== Flags of the Crown Dependencies using defaced Blue Ensigns ==
- Government Ensign of Alderney
- Government Ensign of Guernsey
- Government Ensign of Jersey

== Flags of British Overseas Territories using defaced Blue Ensigns ==
Current flags:

- Flag of Anguilla
- Government Ensign of Bermuda (used only by Department of Marine and Ports and the Bermuda Police Service vessels - the territorial flag commonly used on land is Bermuda's Red Ensign)
- Flag of the British Virgin Islands
- Flag of the Cayman Islands
- Flag of the Falkland Islands
- Government Ensign of Gibraltar (there is another flag, not based on an ensign, that is commonly used on land)
- Flag of Montserrat
- Flag of the Pitcairn Islands
- Saint Helena, Ascension and Tristan da Cunha:
  - Flag of Saint Helena
  - Flag of Ascension Island
  - Flag of Tristan da Cunha
- Flag of South Georgia and the South Sandwich Islands
- Flag of the Turks and Caicos Islands

Former flags:

The defaced blue ensign was formerly used as:

- Flag of Bengal Presidency
  Bengal Presidency flag, 1612–1947
- The flag of the Gilbert and Ellice Islands Colony from 1937 to 1976, then the flag of the Gilbert Islands (1976–1979)
- The jack of the Royal Canadian Navy from its inception until the adoption of the Maple Leaf flag in 1965 The blue ensign was approved by the British Admiralty in 1868 for use by ships owned by the Canadian government.
  Blue Ensign worn as a jack by the Royal Canadian Navy 1911–1921 (with four provincial arms in the shield)
  Blue Ensign worn as a jack by the Royal Canadian Navy 1921–1957 (with green maple leaves in the shield)
  Blue Ensign worn as a jack by the Royal Canadian Navy 1957–1965 (with red maple leaves in the shield)
- The ensign (1879–1928) and the jack (1928–1947) of the Royal Indian Navy (HM Indian Marine: 1879–1892, Royal Indian Marine: 1892–1934, Royal Indian Navy: 1934–1950):
  Blue Ensign worn as an ensign (1879–1928) and a jack (1928–1947) of the Royal Indian Navy
- Flag of the United States of the Ionian Islands (a British amical protectorate, 1815–1864)
- Flag of Hong Kong (1871–1997)
- Flag of Weihaiwei (1903–1930)
- Newfoundland
  Newfoundland Blue Ensign, 1870–1904
  Newfoundland Blue Ensign, 1904–1931
  The badge in the flag consists of Mercury, the god of Commerce and Merchandise, presenting to Britannia, a fisherman who, in a kneeling attitude, is offering the harvest of all the sea. Above the device in a scroll are the words Terra Nova, and below the motto Hæc Tibi Dona Fero or "These gifts I bring thee." The seal was redesigned by Adelaine Lane, niece of Governor Sir Cavendish Boyle in 1903.
- The ensign (1910–1928) of the Union of South Africa:
  Blue Ensign flown over the Union's offices abroad, 1910–1928

== National flags based on the Blue Ensign ==
These include:

- Australia
  - New South Wales
  - Queensland
  - South Australia
  - Tasmania
  - Victoria
  - Western Australia
- Fiji (light blue)
- New Zealand
  - Cook Islands
- Tuvalu (light blue)

== Other flags based on the Blue Ensign ==
- Flag of Cupids, Newfoundland and Labrador
- Flag of Niagara-on-the-Lake, Ontario
- Flag of Ceylon
- Ensign of The Royal Hospital School
- George Rex Flag
- Tanganyika Territory blue ensign
- Fijian government ensign
  - Fijian customs ensign
- Flag of Australasia team at the Olympic games
- Flag used to represent Northern Ireland at the 1934 British Empire Games
- Flag of the Blood 148 Kainai Nation of Alberta, Canada
- Flag of Britain First Party
- Flag of Hawaii

== See also ==
- Australian flag debate
- Ensign
- Green Ensign
- Historical flags of the British Empire and the overseas territories
- New Zealand flag debate
- Red Ensign
- White Ensign
