= Saint Helena plover =

Conservation status
- Vulnerable (IUCN 3.1)

Scientific classification
- Kingdom: Animalia
- Phylum: Chordata
- Class: Aves
- Order: Charadriiformes
- Family: Charadriidae
- Genus: Anarhynchus
- Species: A. sanctaehelenae

Binomial name
- Anarhynchus sanctaehelenae (Harting, 1873)
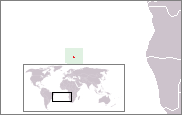
- Location of Saint Helena

Synonyms
- Charadrius sanctaehelenae

Species of bird

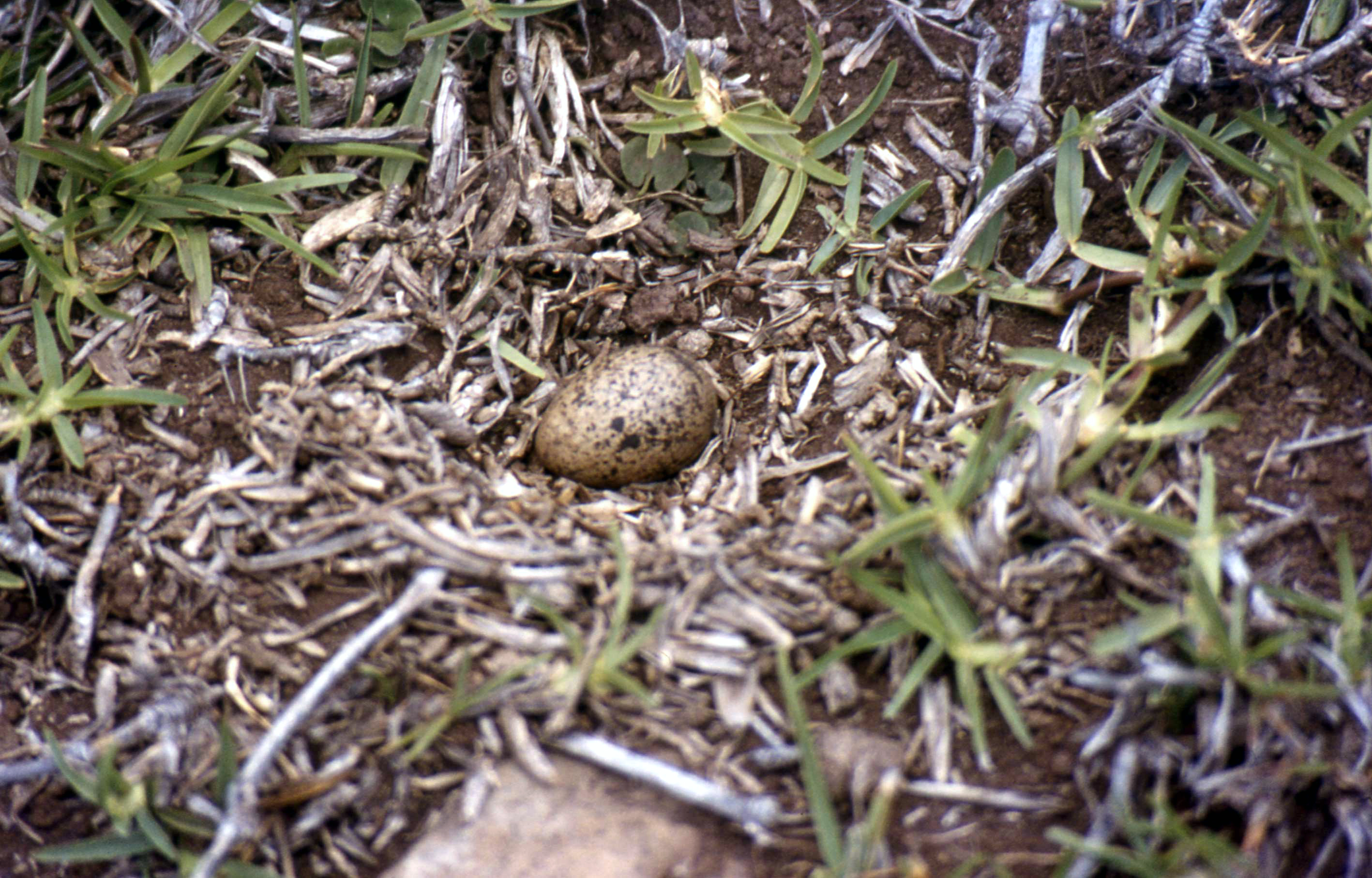
The wirebird's nest and egg

The Saint Helena plover (Anarhynchus sanctaehelenae), locally known as the wirebird due to its thin legs, is a small wader endemic to the island of Saint Helena in the mid-Atlantic. The bird is similar in appearance to Kittlitz's plover and the Madagascar plover, but a little larger and an absence of chamois coloring. It is the national bird of St Helena and has been depicted on the country's coins. Populations in general have been declining. Threats include predation by cats, the introduction of the common myna, deforestation, off-road vehicle use, the Saint Helena Airport and a projected windfarm. As of 2021, the population had recovered to about 545 mature individuals, from a previous minimum of less than 200 in 2006; consequently, the species was downlisted to Vulnerable from its previous assessment of Critically Endangered.

== Description ==
Kittlitz's plover is the Saint Helena bird's closest relative. The Saint Helena plover is generally larger (around 15 cm (6 in) in size) with spindlier legs.

The bird was first mentioned in 1638, and is the national bird of Saint Helena, featured on the island's coat of arms and flag. Some older local 5 pence coins (those issued prior to 1998) have the wirebird on the reverse.

This plover is resident all year on the open areas of Saint Helena, and it is thought that the widespread deforestation on the island, while generally harmful for the island's ecosystem, has in fact benefitted this particular species, since it lives in open clearings in the forest.

== Status and conservation ==
Saint Helena plover numbers have been fluctuating, but in general the trend has been downward since at least the 1970s. Feral cats and accidentally introduced rats are believed to have played a significant role in the decline, as, to a lesser extent has the introduced common myna.

A census in 1988–89 recorded roughly 450 birds, although that number declined sharply over the following decade, due to causes not fully understood. By the late 1990s and early 2000s, censuses suggested that the bird's numbers had stabilised at about 350 adults. However, surveys done in 2005–6 recorded another sharp decline, with only some 200–220 adult birds remaining. Due to its dropping numbers and uncertain prospects, the Saint Helena plover was uplisted to Critically Endangered in the 2007 version of the IUCN Red List. A reassessment in 2016 suggested that the population had recovered somewhat from this minimum and may be slowly increasing; as a consequence, the species was downlisted to Vulnerable.

The reasons for the previous decline and ongoing inhibition of population growth decline remain elusive. Habitat loss—due to changes in agricultural practices, increases in invasive plant populations, and development—has almost certainly had an impact. The increasing use of off-road vehicles threatens nests and eggs. Feral cat populations are increasing, as trapping levels have declined and fewer people neuter their pet cats. Construction activity has apparently dispersed some of the smaller subpopulations. The newly built Saint Helena Airport at Prosperous Bay Plain has altered one of the major patches of remaining habitat, especially as other grassland is now slated for reforestation to aid recovery of the island's ecosystem, and a major wind turbine project has been proposed for the species' most important breeding area. There are currently projects underway led by the RSPB to monitor the birds and try to stop their decline.
