= Coat of arms of Tristan da Cunha =

Heraldic emblem of the British territory

- Armiger: Government of Tristan da Cunha
- Adopted: 2002
- Crest: In a naval crown Or, a longboat on waves of the sea Proper
- Shield: Per fess Azure and Argent, a Lozenge Ployé between four albatrosses counterchanged
- Supporters: Two Tristan rock lobsters Proper
- Motto: Our faith is our strength
- Earlier version(s): Tristan da Cunha formerly used the coat of arms of Saint Helena

The coat of arms of Tristan da Cunha was granted on 20 October 2002.

== Arms ==
The arms consist of a shield featuring four albatrosses in a blue-and-white mirror image design. The central diamond-shaped charge is based on a charge from the arms of the da Cunha family to which Admiral Tristão da Cunha belonged, after whom the island is named: "cunha" in Portuguese means "wedge", and blue wedges feature in the da Cunha arms as a canting charge. The two supporters are Tristan rock lobsters, which are found in the waters surrounding the island. The crest on the closed or tilting helm (of the Da Cunha family of esquires), features a naval crown and a Tristan da Cunha longboat.

The motto is “Our faith is our strength”.

== Flag ==
The arms feature on the flag of Tristan da Cunha, granted on the same date as the arms, and on the defaced Union Flag used by the Administrator.

== Previous arms ==
Prior to 2002, as a dependency of Saint Helena, Tristan da Cunha used their coat of arms.

== See also ==
- List of coats of arms of the United Kingdom and dependencies
