= Flag of Ascension Island =

Ascension Island
- Flag of Ascension Island
- Use: Civil and state flag, state ensign
- Proportion: 1:2
- Adopted: 11 May 2013
- Design: Blue Ensign with the coat-of-arms of Ascension Island in the fly.

The flag of Ascension Island, part of the British overseas territory of Saint Helena, Ascension and Tristan da Cunha, was adopted on 11 May 2013. The flag is a Blue Ensign design, defaced with the coat of arms of Ascension Island.

== Flag history ==
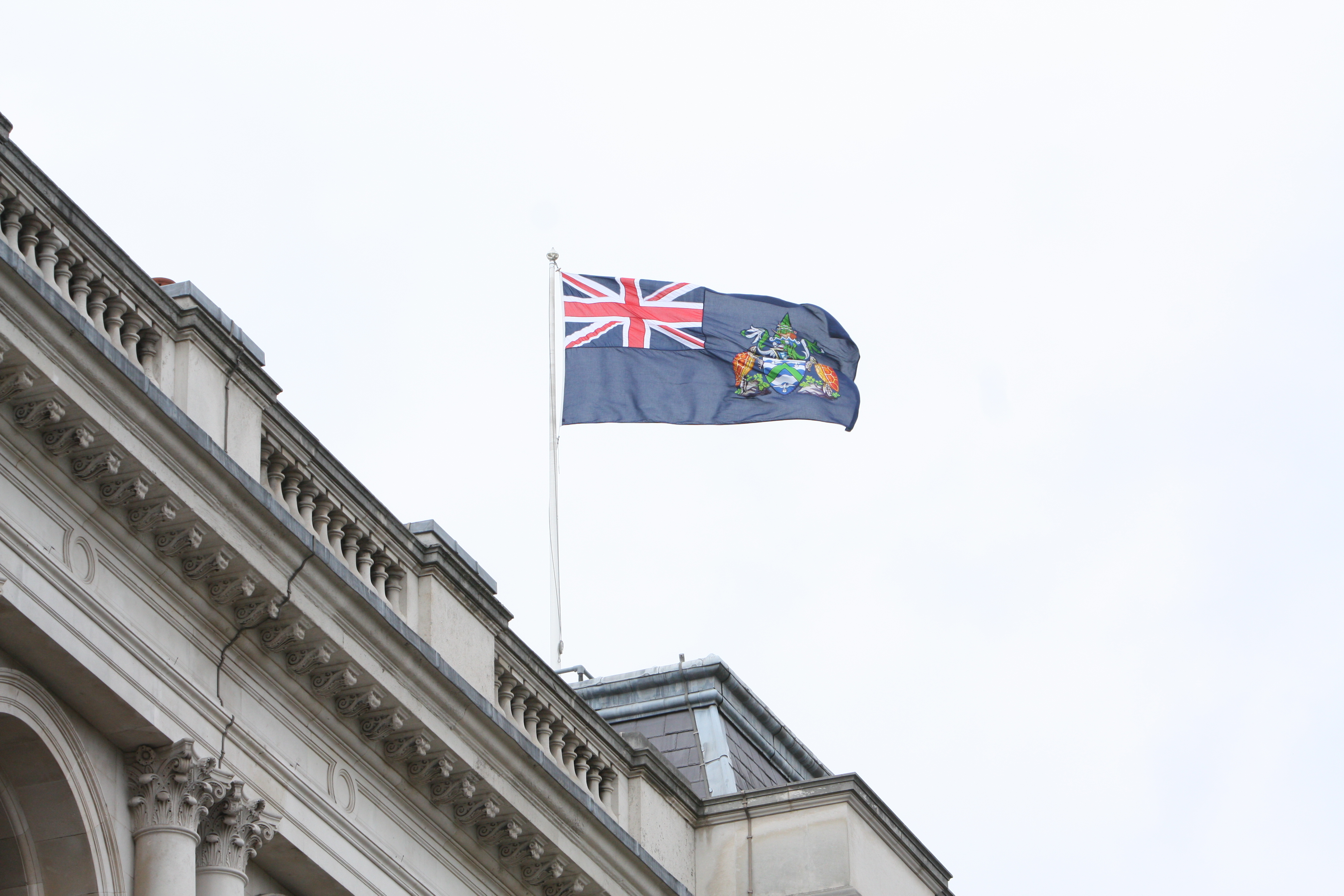
Flag waving

The current flag was flown for the first time on 11 May 2013. Prior to the adoption of this flag, the island used the Union Flag of the United Kingdom for official purposes. At its meeting on 3 March 2009, the Ascension Island Council discussed the idea of a new flag and agreed to develop a unique flag for the island in consultation with the Foreign and Commonwealth Office. Members also suggested that a public competition could be held to determine the design of the new flag.

=== The 2010 proposals ===
Two draft proposals for an Ascension Island flag were presented to the Island Council at its meeting on 30 July 2010. Following a public consultation, a final design was published in January 2012 and if approved by the Governor, will be submitted to the College of Arms for approval.

The draft proposals were made public in September 2010. Both are blue ensigns defaced with the proposed coats of arms.

=== 2012 proposal ===
The Ascension Island Council approved a final design for a coat of arms in January 2012. Following the agreement of the Governor of St Helena, Ascension and Tristan de Cunha, the design was submitted to the College of Arms for formal be a blue ensign defaced with the proposed arms. The arms received royal approval in August 2012 and are now in official use by the Ascension Island Government.

An unofficial flag was used to represent Ascension Island at the Thames Diamond Jubilee Pageant in June 2012. The flag was a blue ensign defaced with the coat of arms proposed in January 2012. An image of this flag appeared in the official flag guide to the event published by the Flag Institute.

A final design for the island's flag was agreed by the Ascension Island Council in November 2012 and received approval from HM the Queen in April 2013. This flag was raised for the first time on 11 May 2013.

2010 Proposal A

2010 Proposal B

June 2012 proposal
