= Flag of South Georgia and the South Sandwich Islands =

South Georgia and the South Sandwich Islands
- Flag of South Georgia and the South Sandwich Islands
- Proportion: 1:2
- Adopted: 1999
- Design: Blue Ensign with the coat-of-arms of South Georgia and the South Sandwich Islands in the fly.
- Flag of the Commissioner for South Georgia and the South Sandwich Islands
- Proportion: 1:2
- Adopted: 1999
- Design: Union Jack with the coat-of-arms of the South Georgia and the South Sandwich Islands in the centre.

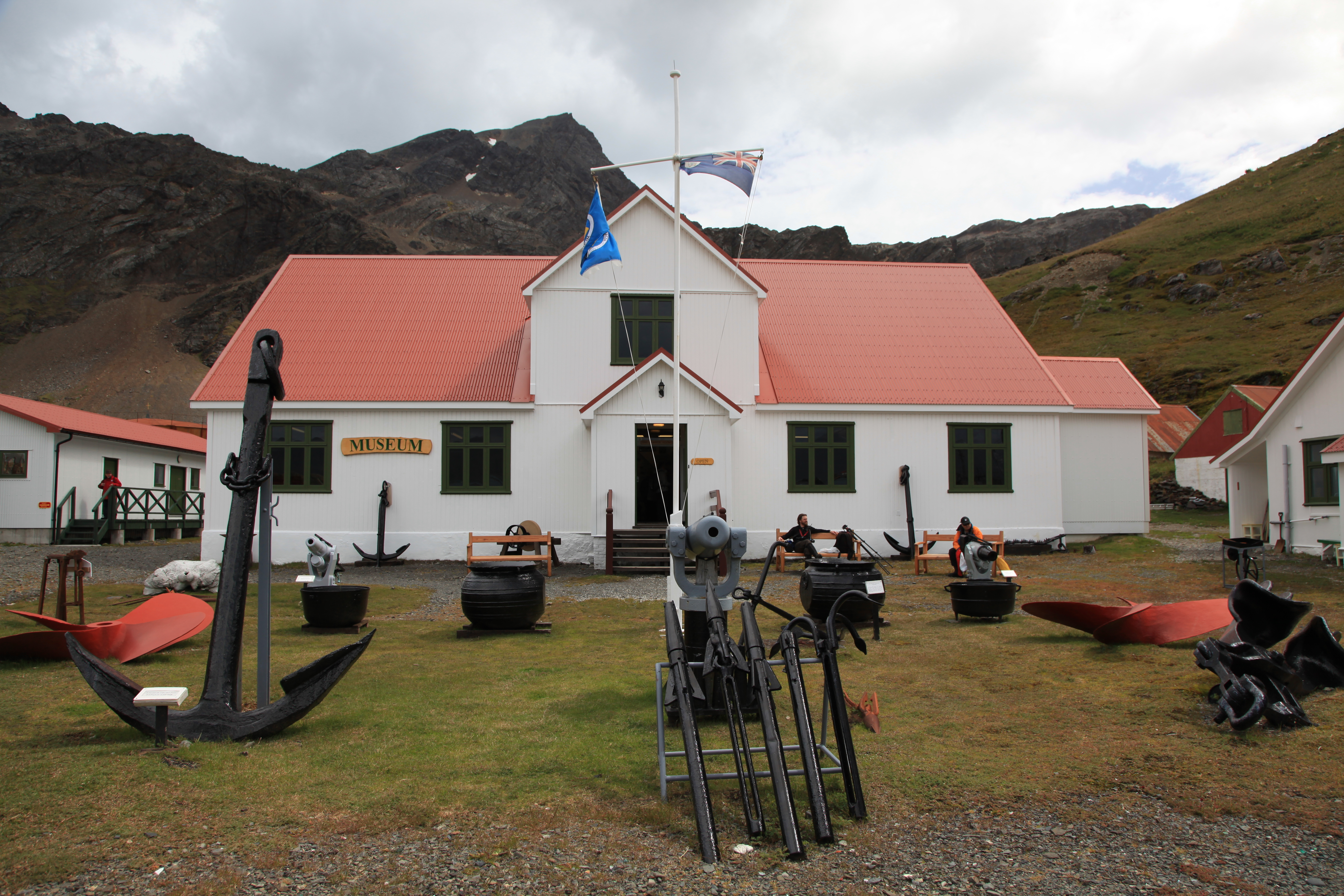
Flag of South Georgia and the South Sandwich Islands (right) outside the South Georgia Museum

The flag of South Georgia and the South Sandwich Islands was granted on 3 October 1985, when the Territory was created. Previously the Territory was a part of the former Falkland Islands Dependencies and used the same flag as the Falklands Islands.

== History ==
The new territory of South Georgia and the South Sandwich Islands (SGSSI) was created in 1985, as is evidenced by the letters patent and order in council that are shown in full on the South Georgia government website. Prior to 1985, the area had been administered as a dependency of the Falkland Islands. The arms of South Georgia and the South Sandwich Islands were granted by royal warrant on 14 February 1992. The website of the SGSSI has a copy of the warrant, which addresses the arms only, and does not mention any flag. After the arms were granted in February 1992, the government of SGSSI started using them on the British Blue Ensign as is customary in British dependencies.

The original flag had a smaller version of the coat-of-arms displayed in a white disc, but this was later changed to the current flag. In June 2006, the College of Arms in Newsletter No. 9 said, "South Georgia and Sandwich Islands: the flag of this overseas territory, illustrated left, has been approved by Her Majesty and accordingly placed on record at the College of Arms, along with the flag of the commissioner of the territory. College reference: Standards 5/96, 97." The flag that is illustrated in Newsletter No. 9 shows the arms in full, without a white disc.

== Design ==
The flag is a Blue Ensign, with the Union Flag in the canton, defaced with the coat-of-arms, and the motto Leo Terram Propriam Protegat ('let the lion protect its own land').

An explanation of the symbolism of the flag exists in Roman Klimes' 'Symbols of Antarctica': the lion represents Britain, the torch exploration. The reindeer, seal and penguin are local to the islands.

The flag flies over the main government settlements on South Georgia Island, and the scientific bases of the British Antarctic Survey.

=== Colours ===
The colours on the flag are that of the British flag, plus a seal:

Scheme	Blue	Red	White
Pantone (Paper)	281 C	186 C	White
Web colours	#00205B	#C8102E	#FFFFFF
RGB	0, 32, 91	200, 16, 46	255, 255, 255
CMYK	100%, 65%, 0%, 64%	0%, 92%, 77%, 22%	0%, 0%, 0%, 0%

== Other flags ==
=== Commissioner's flag ===
There is also a flag to represent the Civil Commissioner of the Territory, a Union Flag defaced with the coat-of-arms. As the Civil Commissioner is also the Governor of the Falkland Islands, the flag is only in use when the Commissioner visits the Territory. The original version of the commissioner's flag just displayed the shield (escutcheon) of the full arms, but it was later changed. In June 2006, the College of Arms (in Newsletter No. 9) said, "South Georgia and Sandwich Islands: the flag of this overseas territory, illustrated left, has been approved by Her Majesty and accordingly placed on record at the College of Arms, along with the flag of the commissioner of the territory. College reference: Standards 5/96, 97."

=== Former flags ===
The very first Blue Ensign flag with a white disc to represent South Georgia and the South Sandwich Islands which was used from 1992 until 1999

The very first flag to represent the Commissioner for South Georgia and the South Sandwich Islands which was used from 1992 until 1999

== See also ==
- List of flags of the United Kingdom
