= Coat of arms of Ascension Island =

Heraldic emblem of the British territory

- Armiger: Ascension Island Government
- Adopted: 2012
- Crest: In front of a pile Vert on waves of the sea, an Indiaman Proper, masts and sails furled Argent, flying at the stern the George
- Torse: Argent, Azure and Vert
- Shield: Barry wavy of six Argent and Azure, overall a chevron Vert between three white terns two and one Proper
- Supporters: Two green sea turtles Proper
- Compartment: Two rocks with Ascension Island parsley ferns Proper
- Earlier version(s): Ascension Island formerly used the coat of arms of the United Kingdom

The coat of arms of Ascension Island was granted in August 2012. Prior to this the island used the coat of arms of the United Kingdom for official purposes.

== See also ==
- Flag of Ascension Island
