= Defacement (flag) =

Addition of a symbol or charge to a flag

The British Blue Ensign

The flag of Australia, a defaced British Blue Ensign

In vexillology, defacement is the addition of a symbol or charge to a flag. For example, the Australian flag is the British Blue Ensign defaced with a Southern Cross in the fly.

In the context of vexillology, the word "deface" carries no negative connotations, in contrast to general usage. It simply indicates a differentiation of the flag from that of another owner by addition of elements. For example, many state flags are formed by defacing the national flag with a coat of arms.

== History ==
Where countries pass through changes of regime with contrasting ideological orientations (monarchist/republican, fascist/democratic, communist/capitalist, secular/religious etc.) – all of which, despite their differences, claim allegiance to a common national heritage expressed in a venerated national flag – it can happen that a new regime defaces that flag with its own specific emblem while keeping the basic flag design unchanged. Such changing ideological emblems appeared over time, among others, on the flags of Italy, Hungary, Romania, Germany (West and East; see gallery below), Ethiopia, and Iran. For example, during the Hungarian Revolution of 1956 and the Romanian Revolution of 1989, insurgents tore the emblem of the regime that they opposed out of the national flag and waved the flag with which they identified.

An already defaced flag can be further defaced. For example, the Australian flag is a defaced British Blue Ensign. The Australian Border Force Flag is further defaced with the words "Australian border force" in block letters.

In the United States, it is against the Flag Code to deface the national flag with advertising or with any other sigil, image, or insignia. Such flags are nevertheless commercially available, depicting the seals of various branches of the U.S. military, Native American-related objects such as tomahawks or war bonnets, and the like.

It is common for association football supporters travelling abroad for a match to bring a national flag defaced with the name of their hometown or a similar local identifier.

== Gallery ==
Examples of defaced flags
Flag of the First Austrian Republic and present-day Austria

State flag and Naval ensign of Austria

The flag of Germany

The flag of East Germany, defaced with a national emblem

Flag of France

Flag of Free France, defaced with a red Cross of Lorraine

The flag of Hungary

Flag of Hungary defaced with the "Kossuth coat of arms", official 1946–1949 and 1956–1957

Flag of Communist Hungary defaced with the "Rákosi coat of arms", 1949–1956

Flag of Communist Hungary defaced with the "Kádár coat of arms", 1957–1990

The flag of Serbia

The flag of Serbia, defaced with the coat of arms

The flag of Montenegro (1905–1918), a defaced Serbian flag with the coat of arms of Montenegro

The flag of Serbia (1947–1992) and flag of Montenegro (1946–1993), defaced with a red star

The flag of Ukraine

The flag of Zakarpattia Oblast, defaced with a coat of arms

The flag of Vietnam

Flag of the Vietnam People's Public Security (Police), defaced with the force's Vietnamese motto on the top corner

Flag of the Vietnam People's Army (VPA), also similarly defaced with the force's Vietnamese motto on the top corner

Flag of the Vietnam People's Air Force, being VPA flag further defaced with the service's Vietnamese name below the star
