= Flag and coat of arms of the Pitcairn Islands =

Flag of the Pitcairn Islands
- Use: Civil and state flag, state ensign
- Proportion: 1:2
- Adopted: 2 April 1984; 42 years ago
- Design: A Blue Ensign charged in the fly with the coat of arms of the Pitcairn Islands

Coat of arms of the Pitcairn Islands
- Adopted: 4 November 1969
- Crest: A Wreath Or and Vert on a Mount Vert a representation of the Pitcairn Island Wheelbarrow in front of a Slip of Milo leaved and fructed proper.
- Torse: Green and yellow
- Shield: Azure on a Pile in base Vert fimbriated Or a representation of the Bounty Bible proper and in base of the Anchor of H.M.S. Bounty Or.

Pitcairn Islands is a British Overseas Territory in the southern Pacific Ocean. Consisting of a set of four volcanic islands scattered across several hundred kilometers, three of the four islands are uninhabited. The coat of arms of the Pitcairn Islands is the official emblem of the territory, which was incorporated in November 1969. The flag of the Pitcairn Islands consists of a Blue Ensign displaying the coat of arms and was adopted in April 1984.

== Background ==
Pitcairn Islands is a group of four volcanic islands which form a British Overseas Territory in the southern Pacific Ocean. The four islands—Pitcairn, Henderson, Ducie and Oeno—are scattered across several hundred kilometres of ocean and have a combined land area of about 47 km^{2} (18 sq mi). While Henderson Island accounts for 86% of the land area, only Pitcairn Island is inhabited. The Pitcairn Islanders are mostly descendants from nine British mutineers of HMS Bounty and twelve Tahitian women.

== Coat of arms ==
The coat of arms of the Pitcairn Islands is the official emblem of the territory, and was granted by royal warrant on 4 November 1969. It features several symbols relevant to the ancestral history and culture of the Pitcairn Islanders, most of whom are descended from the sailors of HMS Bounty in 1789. The blue, yellow and green of the shield symbolise the island of Pitcairn rising from the Pacific Ocean, while the anchor and Bible are symbols of HMS Bounty. Additionally, the Bible symbolises Christianity, which was brought to the island by the mutineers. The shield is surrounded by a green and gold wreath, and crested by a helmet bearing a wheelbarrow and a slip of milo, a local tree, which represent the role agriculture played in helping the mutineers survive on the island. The slip of miro also represents the wood used by Pitcairn Islanders for crafting souvenirs.

== Flag ==
The flag of the Pitcairn Islands was granted on 2 April 1984. It features a Blue Ensign (featuring the Union Jack of the United Kingdom) with the Pitcairn coat of arms defaced on the fly. The design was suggested by the Island Council in December 1980 and granted later in 1984. It was first flown in May 1984, during a visit by the then-governor Richard Stratton.

== Gallery ==
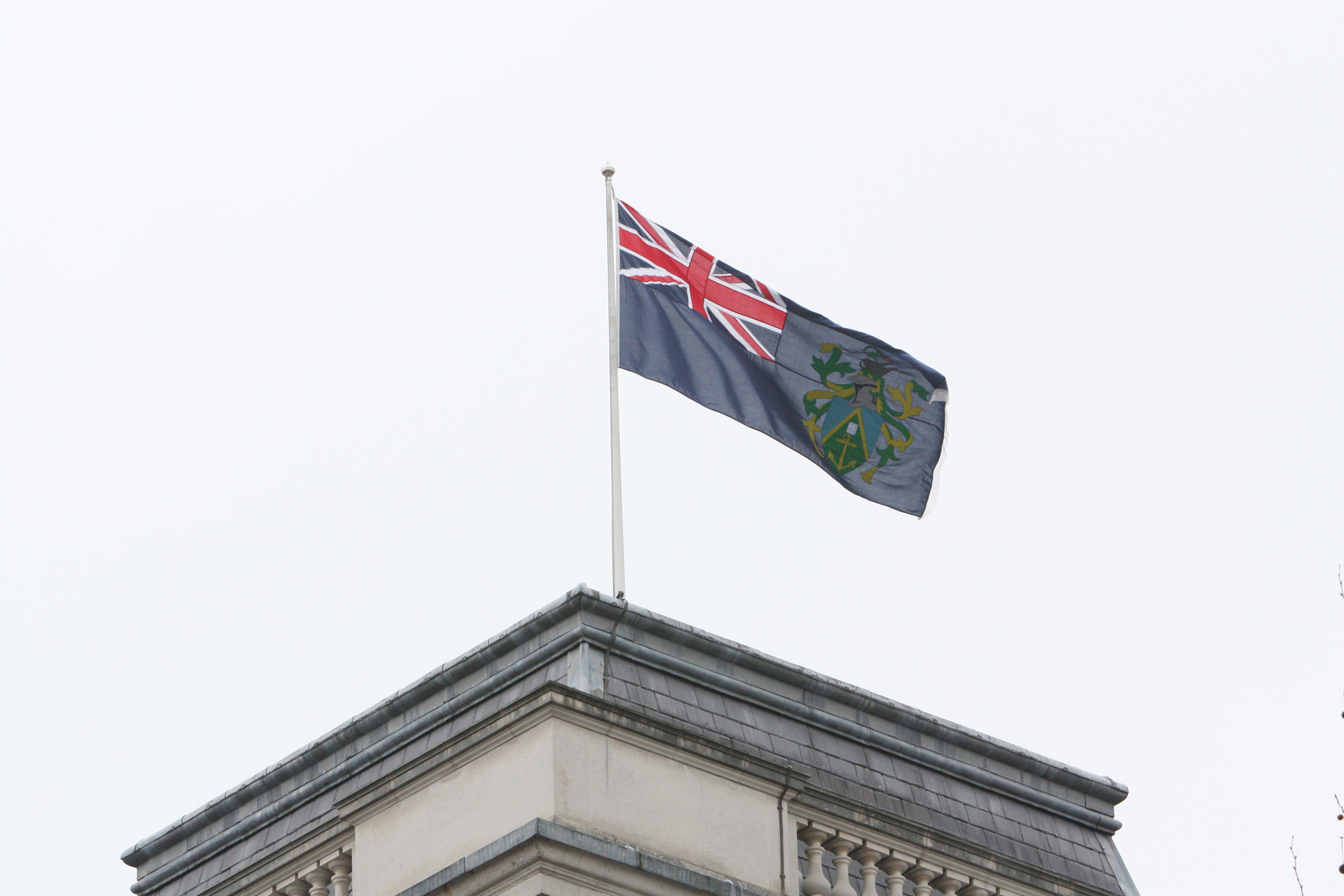
Flag flying over the Foreign and Commonwealth Office in London in January 2013

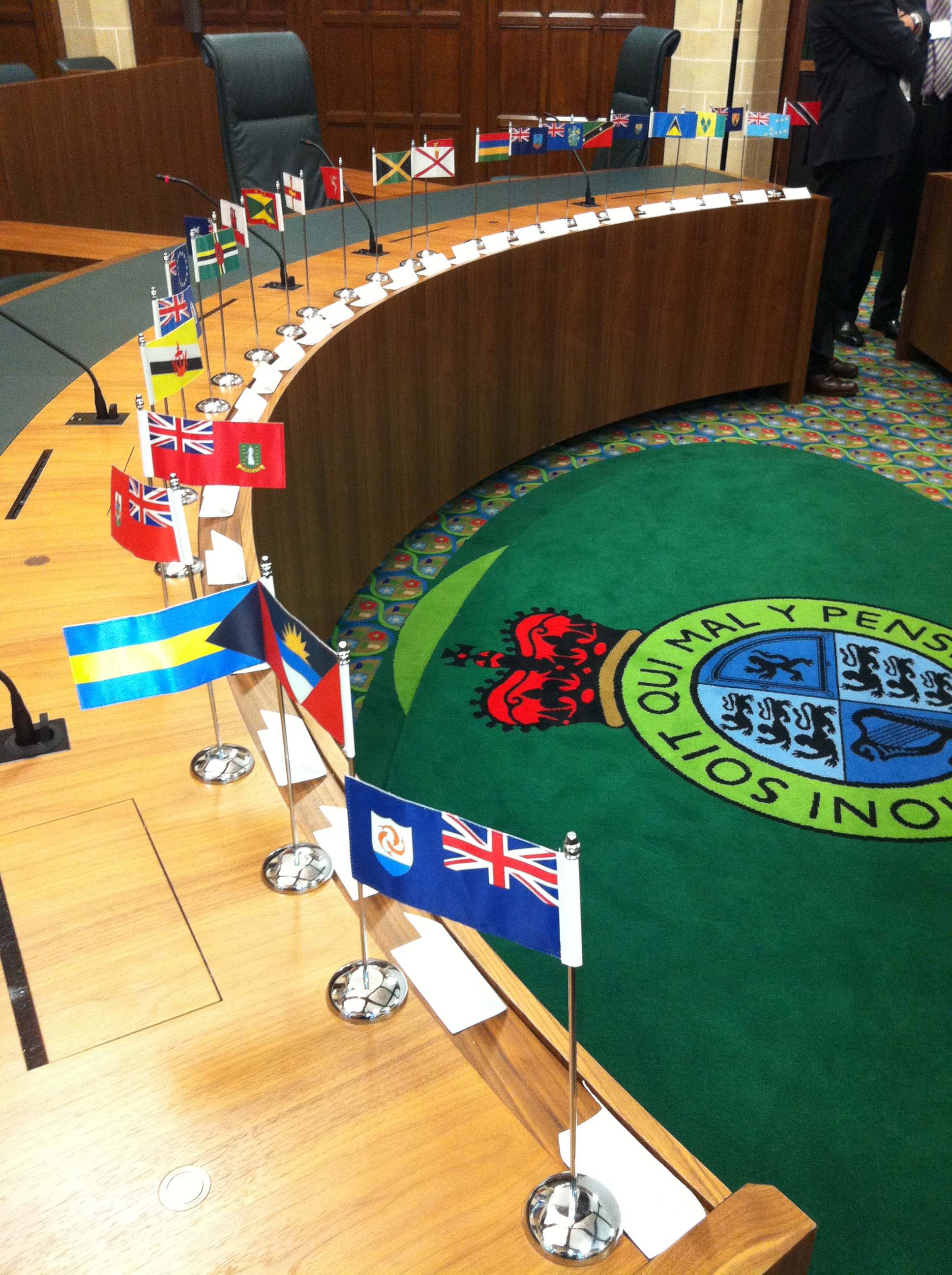
Flag of the Pitcairn Islands (eighth from the back) in Court 3 of the Judicial Committee of the Privy Council
