= Emblem of Sudan =

- Armiger: Republic of the Sudan
- Adopted: 1985; 41 years ago
- Motto: النصر لنا (Arabic) ("Victory is ours")

The Emblem of Sudan has been in use since 1985.

== Design ==
Because this national symbol follows the rules of heraldry it could be considered a national coat of arms instead of a national emblem.

It shows a secretary bird bearing a shield (escutcheon) from the time of Muhammad Ahmad, the self-proclaimed Mahdi who briefly ruled Sudan in the 19th century.

Two scrolls are placed on the arms; the upper one displays the national motto, An-nasr lanā النصر لنا ("Victory is ours"), and the lower one displays the title of the state, جمهورية السودان Jumhūriyat as-Sūdān ("Republic of the Sudan").

The coat of arms is also the Presidential seal and is found in gold on the flag of the president of Sudan and on the vehicles carrying the president and at his residence.

The secretary bird was chosen as a distinctively Sudanese and indigenous variant of the "Eagle of Saladin" and "Hawk of Quraish" seen in the emblems of some Arab states, and associated with Arab nationalism (see Coat of arms of Egypt, etc.).

== History ==
During the period of Anglo-Egyptian condominium, the British governor-general of Sudan used a badge that contained the words "GOVERNOR GENERAL OF THE SUDAN" surrounded by a laurel wreath.

Upon independence in 1956, the Republic of Sudan adopted an emblem depicting a rhinoceros enclosed by two palm-trees and olive branches, with the name of the state, جمهورية السودان Jumhūriyat as-Sūdān ("Republic of the Sudan"), displayed below. This emblem was used until 1970.

Seal of Turco-Egyptian Sudan.

Emblem of Anglo-Egyptian Sudan.

Badge used by the governor-general of Anglo-Egyptian Sudan.

National emblem of the Republic of the Sudan from 1956 to 1970.

Emblem of the Democratic Republic of the Sudan between 1970 and 1985.

Emblem of the Republic of the Sudan used since 1985 (black version).

Emblem of the Republic of the Sudan used since 1985 (gold version).

== Sub-national emblems ==
Sudan is divided into 18 states and one area with special administrative status. Each state has adopted a distinct emblem for government use.

=== States ===
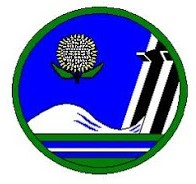
Blue Nile

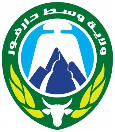
Darfur Central

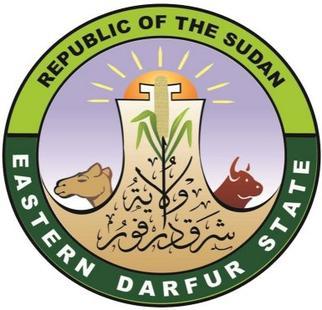
Darfur East

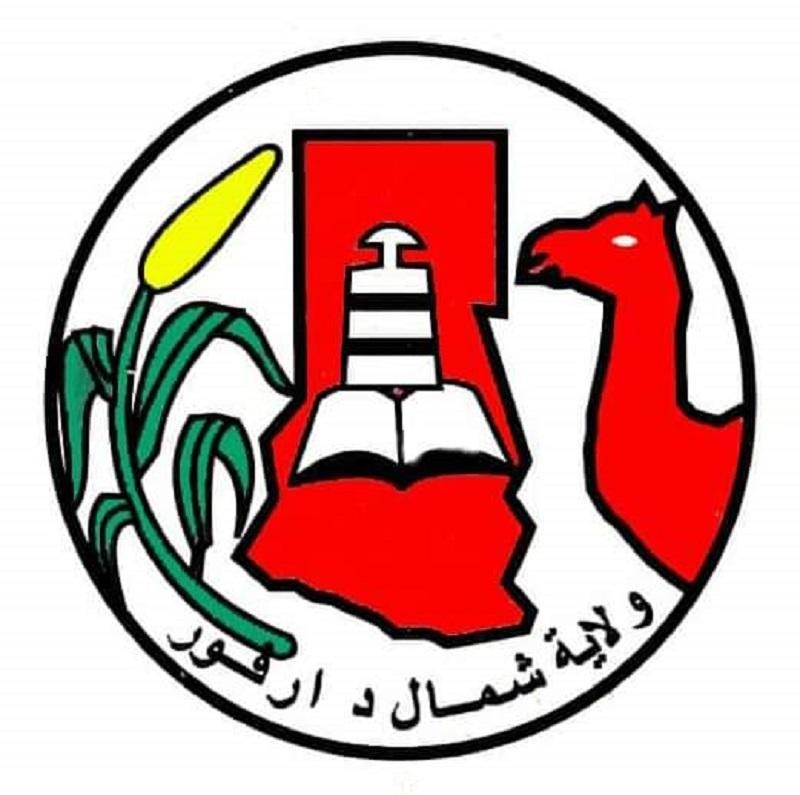
Darfur North

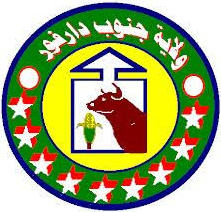
Darfur South

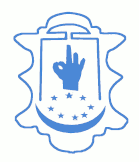
Darfur West

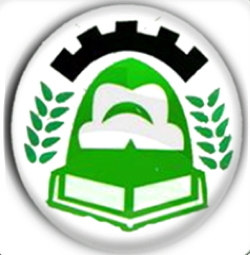
Gezira

Kassala

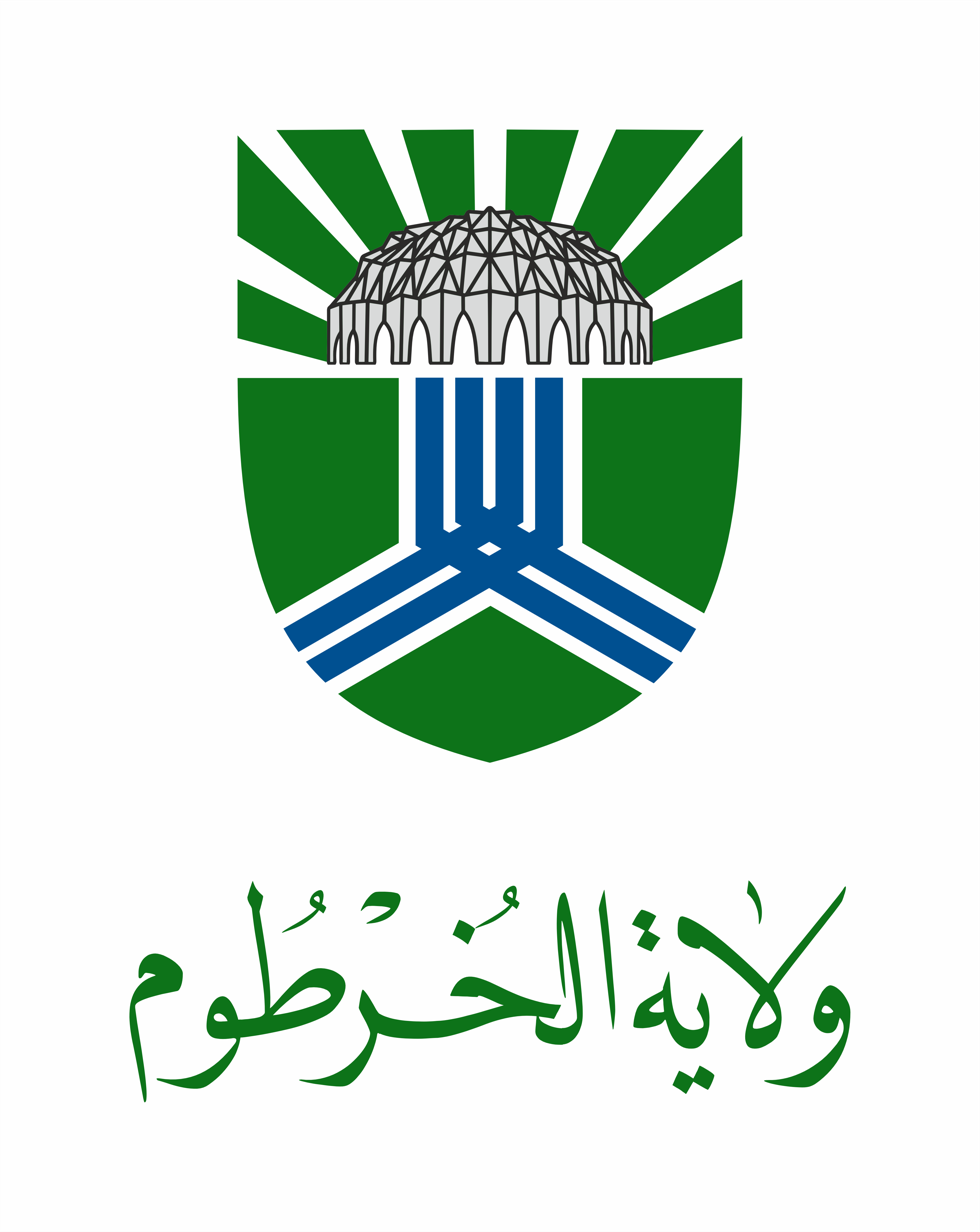
Khartoum

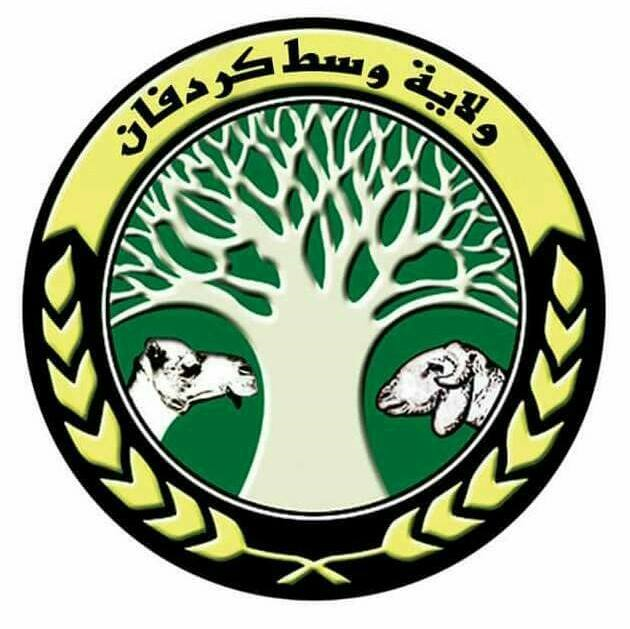
Kordofan North

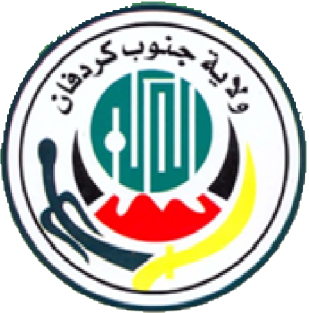
Kordofan South

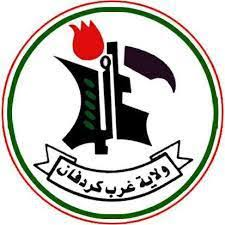
Kordofan West

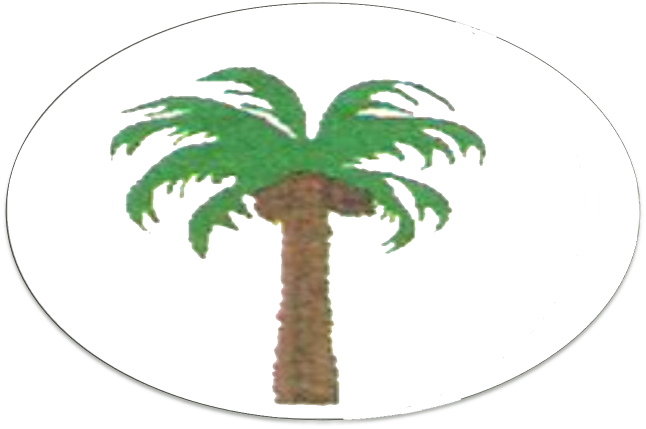
Northern State

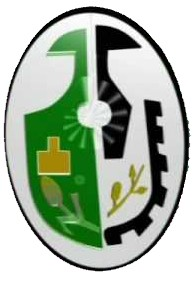
Al Qadarif

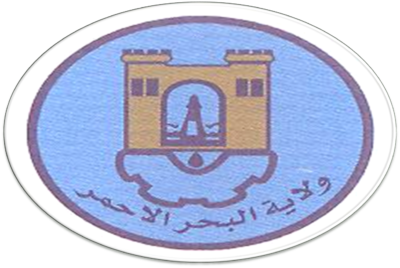
Red Sea

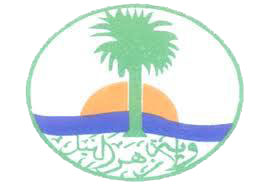
River Nile

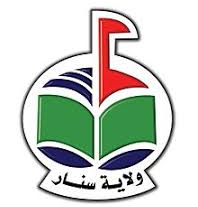
Sennar

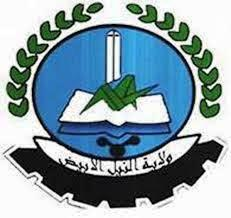
White Nile

=== Administrative areas ===
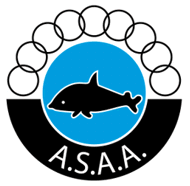
Abyei Special Administrative Area

=== Regions ===
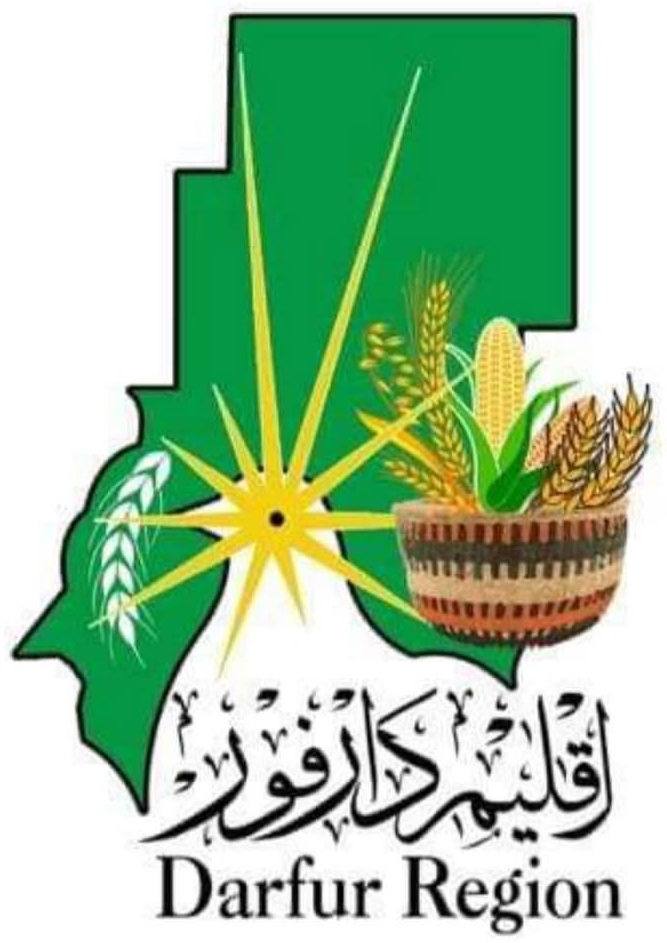
Darfur (Darfur Regional Government)

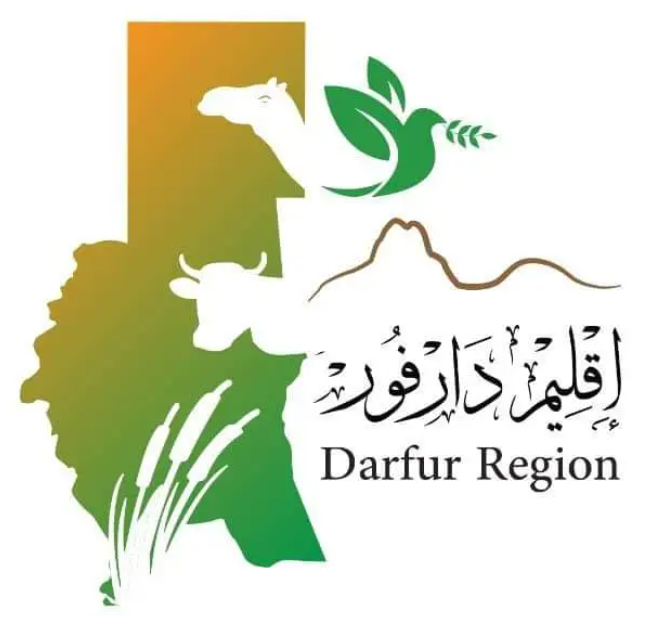
Previous emblem of the Darfur region

=== Municipalities ===
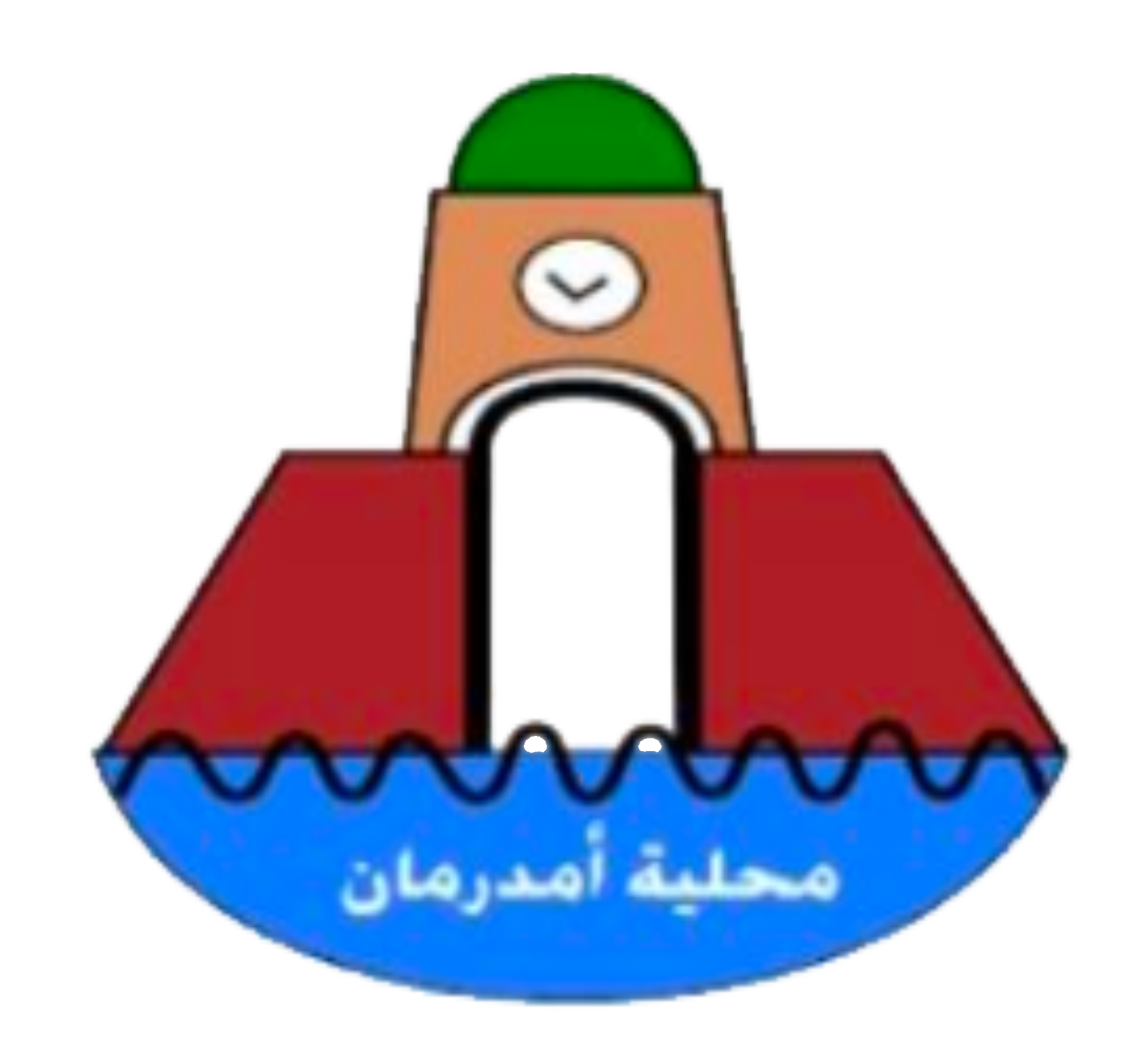
Omdurman

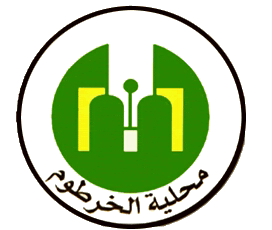
Khartoum

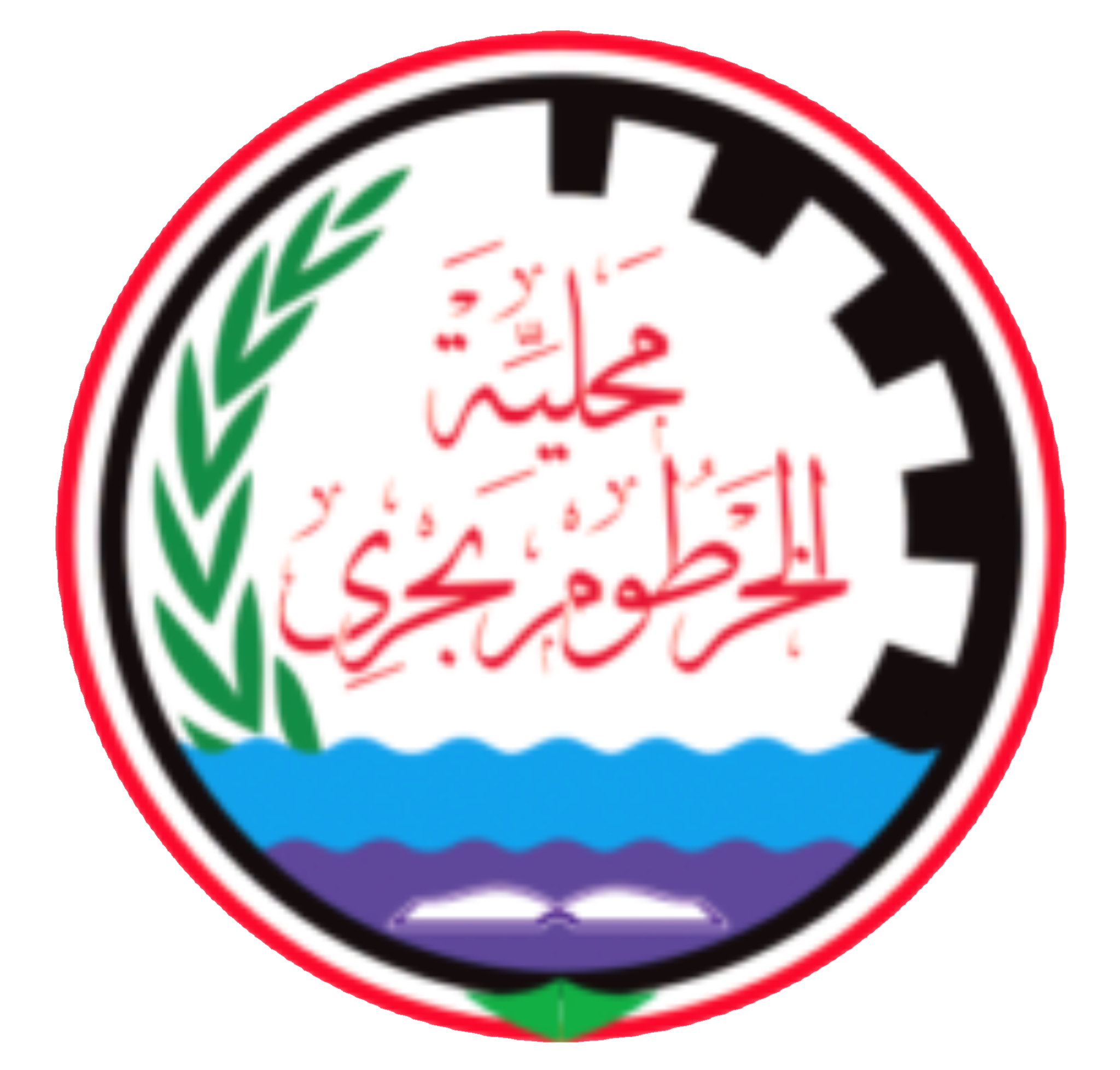
Khartoum Bahri

== See also ==
- Flag of Sudan
- Coat of arms of Iraq
- Coat of arms of Palestine
- Coat of arms of Syria
- Coat of arms of Egypt
- Coat of arms of Libya
- Coat of arms of Yemen
- Emblem of Southern Sudan
- Coat of arms of South Africa
