= Coat of arms of the Federation of Arab Republics =

- Armiger: Federation of Arab Republics
- Adopted: 1 January 1972
- Shield: Or
- Supporters: A Hawk of Quraish
- Motto: Arabic: إتحاد الجمهوريات العربية, Ittiḥād al-Jumhūrīyāt al-'Arabīyah, lit. 'Union of Arab Republics')
- Other elements: Wheat spikes

The coat of arms of the Federation of Arab Republics was the emblem of Egypt, Libya and Syria from 1972–1977. The coat of arms was based on one initially adopted by Syria in 1945 and consisted of a gold Escutcheon supported by a Hawk of Quraish holding in its talons a ribbon bearing the name of the federation.

== Coats of arms of member states ==
Syria used the arms of the federation unaltered. Egypt and Libya added the name of the state below.

Egyptian coat of arms used until 1984, 7 years after the dissolution

Libyan coat of arms used until 1977

Syrian coat of arms used until 1980, 3 years after the dissolution

== Gallery ==
Egyptian arms before 1972

Libyan arms before 1972

Syrian arms before 1972
Egyptian arms after 1984

Libyan arms after 1977

Syrian arms after 1980

== See also ==
- Flag of the Federation of Arab Republics
- Coat of arms of Egypt
- Coat of arms of Libya
- Coat of arms of Syria
- Hawk of Quraish
- Coat of arms of the United Arab Republic
