= Coat of arms of Egypt =

- Armiger: Arab Republic of Egypt
- Adopted: 4 October 1984 (Present form)
- Shield: Tierced per pale gules, argent, and sable
- Supporters: The Eagle of Saladin, wings inverted or.
- Motto: جمهورية مصر العربية; Jumhūrīyat Miṣr al-ʻArabīyah ('Arab Republic of Egypt')

The coat of arms of Egypt is known as the Republican Eagle, National Emblem of Egypt or Egyptian Golden Eagle, is a heraldic golden eagle, facing the viewer's left (dexter). The eagle itself reflects a much older origin in Egyptian history, as it represents the Egyptian vulture. The eagle's breast is charged with an escutcheon bearing the red-white-black bands of the flag of Egypt rotated vertically, whilst the eagle's talons hold a scroll bearing the official name of the state written in Kufic script.

The earliest version of the Eagle of Saladin was that used as the flag of Saladin, the first Sultan of Egypt, whilst the modern version of the eagle was adopted during the Egyptian Revolution of 1952. Subsequently, the modern design of the eagle of Saladin was adopted as the coat of arms of numerous other states in the Arab World, such as the United Arab Republic, North Yemen, Iraq, South Yemen, the Libyan Arab Republic, and Palestine. The current eagle was modified in 1984 to its present form.

== History ==
Eagles have for millennia been symbols of power in Egypt, appearing in innumerable devotional and political artistic representations from the Pharoanic era onwards, and used as the heraldic banners of pagan, Christian, and Muslim rulers well in to the medieval era. Several hieroglyphs include the Egyptian vulture including what is listed as G1 in the Gardiner's sign list – U+1313F 𓄿. The bird was held sacred to Isis and Mut in ancient Egyptian religion.

Chief amongst these was Saladin, who adopted an eagle as his personal standard upon his coronation as Sultan of Egypt in 1174. Subsequent Egyptian rulers, from both the Ayyubid dynasty that he founded, and the Mamluk military caste that succeeded it, would continue his use of the heraldic eagle.

Saladin's celebrated stature as the leader who recaptured Jerusalem from the Crusaders, led to the eagle that bears his name becoming associated with renewed Egyptian and Arab nationalism from the late 19th century onwards, ultimately becoming the symbol of the Egyptian Revolution of 1952. The Egyptian revolutionaries of the Free Officers Movement under Mohamed Naguib and Gamal Abdel Nasser emblazoned on the eagle's breast the green field and white crescent and stars of the old flag of the Kingdom of Egypt, and placed the eagle in the centre of the horizontal red-white-black bands of the revolution's Arab Liberation Flag. In so doing, they incorporated all four of the Pan-Arab colours of red, white, black, and green derived from the Rashidun, Umayyad, Abbasid, and Fatimad caliphates of Medina, Damascus, Baghdad, and Cairo respectively.

In addition to being one of the four Pan-Arab colours, and the predominant colour of the old flag of the Kingdom of Egypt, the colour green was itself strongly associated with nationalism in Egypt, particularly due to its use on the banner of the Egyptian Revolution of 1919. As the subsequent revolution of 1952 was explicitly committed to both Egyptian and Arab nationalism, Naguib and Nasser insisted on the inclusion of green on revolutionary Egypt's coat of arms, and national flag.

When Egypt united with Syria to form the United Arab Republic in 1958, the appearance of the eagle was modified, replacing the monarchical green field and white crescent and stars on the eagle's breast with an escutcheon bearing a vertically rotated flag of the United Arab Republic with two green stars in the central white band representing the two constituent members of the union. In the eagle's talons was placed the official name of the state on a green scroll, thereby, along with the green stars, incorporating once again the colour green on the coat of arms. Whilst the eagle was replaced at the centre of the Arab Liberation Flag by the two green stars, its status as the union's coat of arms meant that it appeared on all state buildings, documents, and uniforms.

Following Egypt's membership of the Federation of Arab Republics in 1972 during the presidency of Anwar Sadat, the Eagle of Saladin was replaced entirely as Egypt's coat of arms by the Hawk of Quraish, which would also take the place of the two green stars in the centre of the national flag. In both policies and symbolism, Sadat was eager to depart from the path of his predecessor, Gamal Abdel Nasser, resulting in the adoption of a new coat of arms, and a modified flag, both of which excluded the colour green. The federation, however, was short-lived, dissolving in 1977. Sadat himself was assassinated in 1981.

In 1984, the Eagle of Saladin was restored as Egypt's coat of arms, and has remained as such since, with the eagle returned to the central white band of the national flag. The appearance of the eagle when re-adopted remained the same as the 1958 version with the exception of it being rendered entirely in gold and white, save for the escutcheon on the eagle's breast, which continues to bear the vertically rotated red-white-black bands of the national flag. Consequently, the changes to Egypt's heraldic colours by Sadat were made permanent, and the current design of Egypt's coat of arms (and national flag) does not include the colour green used in both the revolutions of 1919, and 1952.

== Appearance ==
The Eagle of Saladin holds a scroll on which the name of the state appears in Arabic script, Gumhūriyyat Miṣr al-ʿArabiyyah ("Arab Republic of Egypt"). The eagle carries on its breast a shield with the flag's colors — but with a vertical instead of a horizontal configuration. When appearing on the national flag, the eagle is rendered entirely in gold and white. During the union with Syria in the United Arab Republic (1958–1961), and in the ten years afterwards when Egypt retained the union's official name, the two green stars of the union's flag appeared in the white band of the eagle's shield. Between 1972 and 1984, the eagle was replaced by the golden Hawk of Quraish, as part of the symbolism of the Federation of Arab Republics.

Ancient Egyptian sign symbolizing dominion over upper and lower, Ancient Egypt (3000 BC)

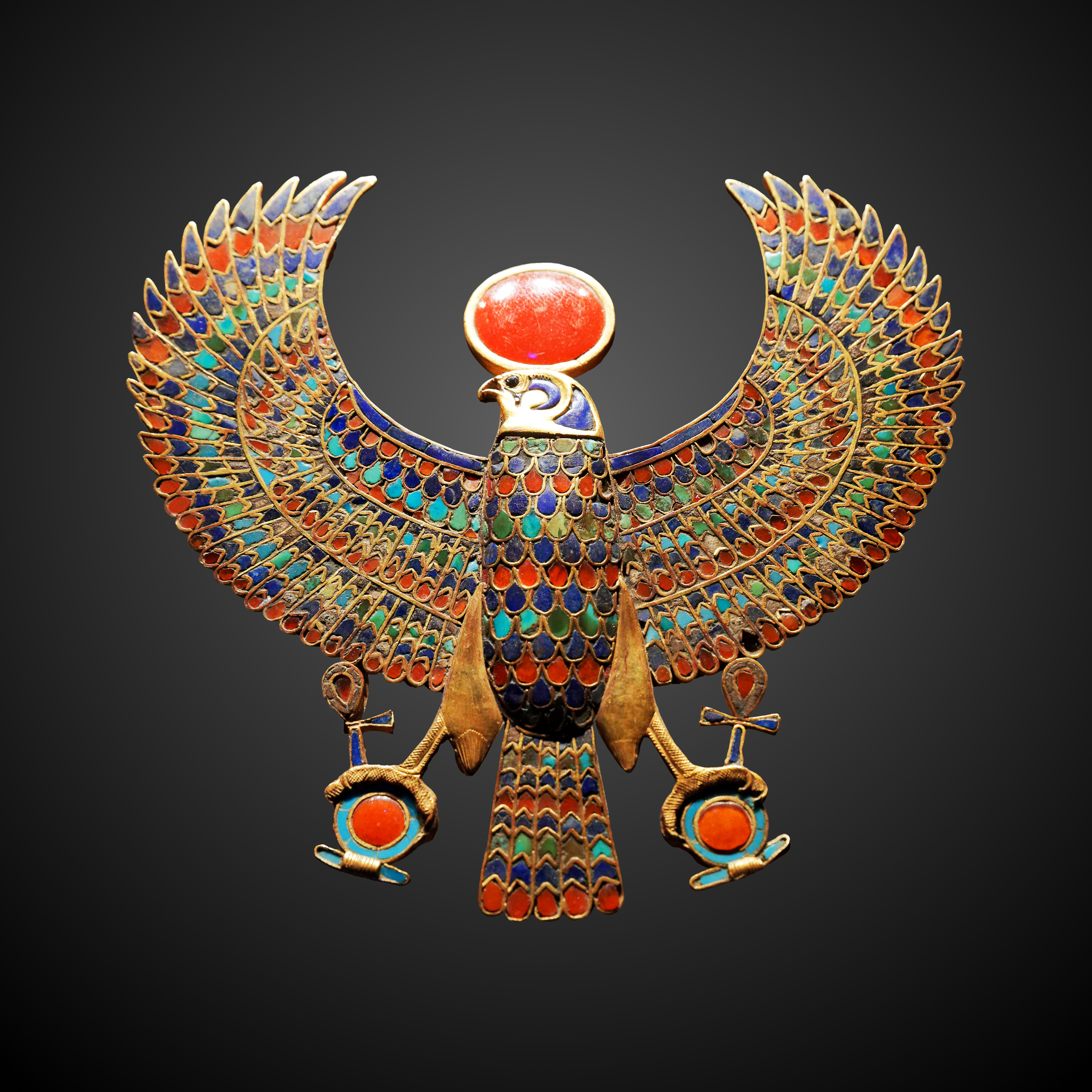
Tutankhamun's Pectoral of Horus with solar disk, Ancient Egypt (c. 1325 BC)

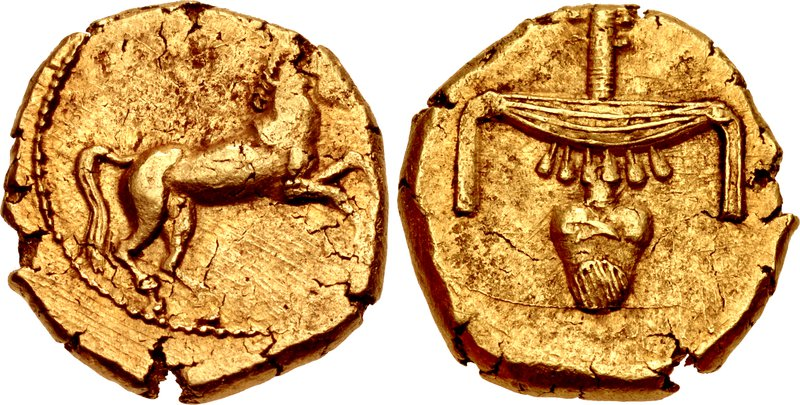
Egyptian gold stater of Nectanebo II: reverse with hieroglyphs nfr-nb, Ancient Egypt (360 BC)

Coat of arms of the Mamluk Sultanate of Egypt (1250–1517)

Coat of arms of the Egypt Eyalet
(1854–1867)

Coat of arms of the Khedivate of Egypt
(1867–1914)

Coat of arms of the Sultanate of Egypt (1914–1922)

Coat of arms of the Kingdom of Egypt (1922–1953)
Coat of arms of Egypt (1953–1958)

Coat of arms of the United Arab Republic (1958–1971) and Egypt (1971–1972)

Coat of arms of Egypt within the Federation of Arab Republics, and during the seven years after the Federation's dissolution (1972–1984)

A version of the coat of arms as it appears on the Flag of Egypt

Official version of the coat of arms of Egypt, 1984–present

Variant of the official coat of arms in a lighter shade

== Military symbols ==
Emblem of the Egyptian Armed Forces

Badge of the Egyptian Air Force

Roundel of Egypt

== See also ==
- Flag of Egypt
- Coat of arms of the United Arab Republic
- Coat of arms of Iraq
- Coat of arms of Palestine
- Coat of arms of Syria
- Coat of arms of Sudan
- Coat of arms of Libya
- Coat of arms of Yemen
- Eagle of Saladin
- Armorial of sovereign states
- Heraldry
- Country coats of arms
