= Flag of Egypt =

Arab Republic of Egypt
- Use: Civil and state flag, civil and state ensign
- Proportion: 2:3
- Adopted: October 4, 1984; 42 years ago
- Design: Horizontally divided red-white-black tricolour flag with the Eagle of Saladin.
- Designed by: ʻAlī Kāmil al-Dīb
- Use: Civil flag and ensign
- Proportion: 2:3
- Adopted: July 23, 1952; 74 years ago
- Design: Variant of the national flag without the Eagle of Saladin. Similar to the flag of Yemen
- Designed by: ʻAlī Kāmil al-Dīb
- Use: Naval ensign
- Proportion: 2:3
- Adopted: October 4, 1984; 42 years ago
- Presidential Standard of Egypt
- Proportion: 2:3
- Adopted: October 4, 1984; 42 years ago
- Design: National flag with gold outlined Eagle of Saladin in canton.

The national flag of Egypt is a tricolour consisting of the three equal horizontal red, white, and black bands of the Arab Liberation Flag that dates back to the 1952 Egyptian Revolution. The flag bears Egypt's national emblem, the Egyptian eagle of Saladin, centred in the white band.

== Symbolism ==
In 1952, the Egyptian Free Officers who toppled King Farouk in the 23 July Revolution assigned specific symbolism to each of the three bands of the revolutionary and liberation flag. The red band symbolizes the Egyptians’ blood in the war against colonization. The white band symbolizes the purity of the Egyptians’ hearts. The black band below the white symbolizes the manner in which darkness is overcome.

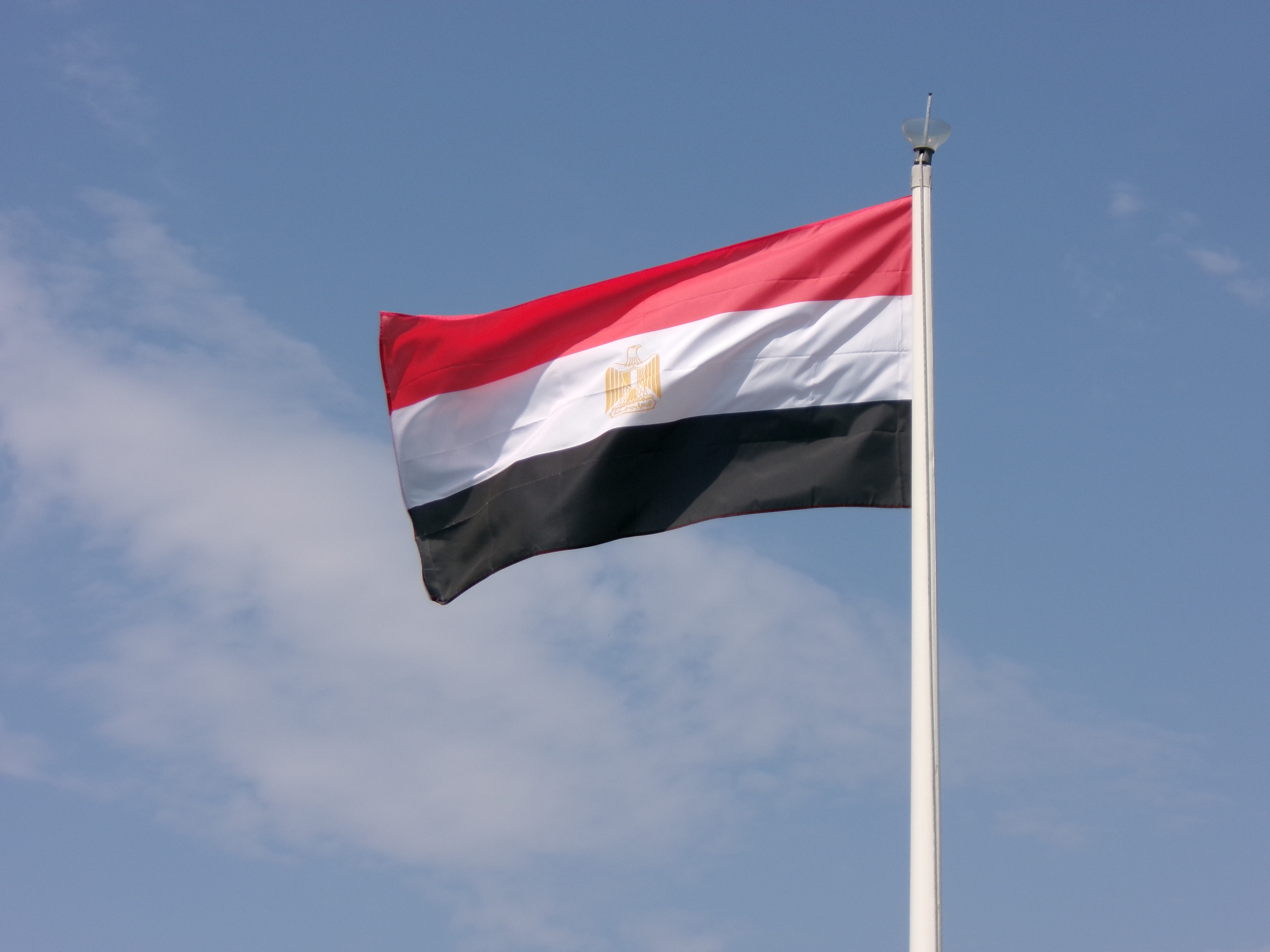
Egyptian flag

The Eagle in the center is regarded as the Egyptian eagle of Saladin, which in itself reflects a much older origin in Egyptian history, as it represents the Egyptian vulture. In Ancient Egypt, several hieroglyphs include the Egyptian vulture including what is listed as G1 in the Gardiner's sign list – U+1313F 𓄿. The bird was held sacred to Isis and Mut in ancient Egyptian religion.

Egypt's Revolutionary and Liberation flag, which was designed on 23 July 1952, was then an inspiration to several Arab countries and was adopted by many Arab states. The same horizontal tricolour is used by Iraq, Sudan and Yemen (and formerly Libya and Syria), the only difference being the presence (or absence) of distinguishing national emblems in the white band.

== Colours scheme ==
Egypt	Red	White	Black	Gold
Pantone	PMS 186	–	PMS Black	PMS 116
RGB	206, 17, 39 ^{a}	255, 255, 255	0, 0, 0	192, 147, 0 ^{a}
Hexadecimal	#CE1126 ^{b}	#FFFFFF	#000000	#C09300 ^{b}
CMYK	0, 92, 81, 19 ^{b}	0, 0, 0, 0	0, 0, 0, 100	0, 23, 100, 25 ^{b}

^a Converted from Pantone color model per connect.pantone.com
^b Converted from RGB based on Inkscape colours value

== History ==
The development of the modern Egyptian flag was determined first by the Muhammad Ali Dynasty, under whom Egypt was united with Sudan, and later by the rise of Egyptian nationalism and revolutionary ideas among the Egyptian Army.

=== Muhammad Ali Dynasty (1805–1922) ===
When Muhammad Ali successfully seized power in Egypt, at that time the country was officially an Eyalet (Egypt Eyalet) of the Ottoman Empire. However, throughout his reign, and that of his sons and grandsons, Egypt enjoyed virtual independence as an own Khedivate. The meaning of the three stars and crescents has been suggested that this was to symbolise the victory of his armies in three continents (Africa, Asia, and Europe), and his own sovereignty over Egypt, Sudan, and Hejaz. The similarity with the flag of the Ottoman Empire was deliberate, as Muhammad Ali harbored grandiose ambitions of deposing the Ottoman dynasty, and seizing the sultanic throne himself.

Egypt retained this flag even after formal Ottoman sovereignty was terminated in 1914, when Egypt was declared to be a sultanate, and a British protectorate.

After the Urabi Revolt in 1882, British forces occupied the country, igniting ever greater nationalist resentment. This reached a peak in the Revolution of 1919, when both the red flag introduced by Muhammad Ali, and a special green banner bearing a crescent and cross were used in protests against the British (the latter symbolizing that both Egypt's Muslim and Christian communities supported the Egyptian nationalist movement against the occupation).

Flag used in the Egyptian Eyalet (1793–1844)

Egyptian Eyalet (1844–1867)

Flag used in Egypt during the rules of Isma'il Pasha and Tewfik Pasha (1867–1881)

Flag of the Khedivate of Egypt (1826–1914) and the Sultanate of Egypt (1914–1922)

Protectorate ensign of the Sultanate of Egypt (1914–1922)

=== Kingdom of Egypt (1922–1953) ===
Flag of the Kingdom of Egypt (1922–1953) and co-official flag of the Republic of Egypt (1953–1958), sometimes used by the Egyptian opposition

In 1922, the UK agreed to formally recognize Egyptian independence, but only on the condition that the Sultan of Egypt, Fuad I, change his title to King. Upon so doing, the now King Fuad issued a Royal Decree formally adopting a new national flag of a white crescent with three white stars on a green background in it.

Officially, and according to the official website of the Egyptian Presidency, the three white stars representing the three religions: Islam, Christianity and Judaism Other opinions suggest that it symbolized the three component territories of the Kingdom, namely Egypt, Nubia, and Sudan, while the green symbolizes the valley and the delta.

=== Republic of Egypt (1953–1958) – Egyptian Free Officers movement ===
Egyptian Revolution Flag (1953–1958) – the tricolor of the 1952 Egypt Revolution, with the Eagle of Saladin in the center and symbolic three stars representing the 3 Abrahamic religions

Following the Revolution of 1952, the Egyptian free officers retained the flag of the Kingdom, but also introduced the Revolutionary and Liberation flag of red, white, and black horizontal bands, with the emblem of the Revolution, the Eagle of Saladin, in the center band. This earlier version of the eagle differs somewhat from the one later adopted. Even when the Kingdom was formally abolished by the declaration of the Republic on July 18, 1953, the flag of the Kingdom remained in official use, until Gamal Abdel Nasser announced the formation of a new regional political union and changed the name to United Arab Republic in 1958. The new flag symbolised a break from the Ottoman-inspired flags of the monarchical period, placing emphasis on the Arab nationalism then espoused by the Nasser government.

=== United Arab Republic – Egyptian-Syrian Union under President Gamal Abdel Nasser (1958–1972) ===
flag of the United Arab Republic (1958–1971) – though Syria withdrew from the union in 1961, Egypt retained the official name until 1971

In 1958, Syria united with Egypt to form the United Arab Republic (UAR) and adopted a national flag based on the original Egyptian Liberation flag after the revolution, but with two green stars (representing the two countries of the union) replacing the former Egyptian Eagle in the white band. A modified version of that eagle was then adopted as the UAR's coat of arms. The flag with the two green stars, representing the two constituent nations was used as the national flag of Syria until the ousting of Bashar al-Assad in December 2024. It was briefly used by the Yemen Arab Republic for two months in 1962.

Colours scheme	Red	White	Green	Black
RGB	206/17/38	255/255/255	0/122/61	0/0/0
Hexadecimal	#CE1126FF	#FFFFFFFF	#007A3DFF	#000000FF
CMYK	0/92/82/19	0/0/0/0	100/0/50/52	0/0/0/100

=== Federation of Arab Republics (1972–1984) – A regional union attempt by Muammar Gaddafi ===
Flag of the Federation of Arab Republics (1972–1984)

Though Syria withdrew from the UAR in 1961, Egypt continued to use the official name of the United Arab Republic until 1971, when the country was renamed officially as the Arab Republic of Egypt. In 1972, when Egypt formed the Federation of Arab Republics along with Syria, and Libya, the UAR's flag (whose design Syria would reuse for their own flag, eight years later) was replaced by a common flag for the Federation, once again based on the Arab Liberation Flag. The two green stars in the white band were replaced by the Hawk of Qureish, which had been the coat of arms of Syria prior to the formation of the UAR in 1958. The Hawk of Qureish was also adopted as the Federation's coat of arms.

Colours scheme	Red	White	Black	Gold
RGB	206/17/38	255/255/255	0/0/0	239/187/34
Hexadecimal	#ce1126	#FFFFFF	#000000	#efbb22
CMYK	0/92/82/19	0/0/0/0	0/0/0/100	0/22/86/6

=== Arab Republic of Egypt (1984–present) ===
Flag of the Arab Republic of Egypt (1984–present)

While the Federation of Arab Republics was dissolved in 1977, Egypt retained the Federation's flag until October 4, 1984, when the gold Hawk of Qureish was replaced in the white band (and on the coat of arms) by the Eagle of Saladin (the 1958 version as opposed to the 1952 version). The shield held by the eagle is colored entirely gold and white, as opposed to the colors seen on the shield on Egypt's coat of arms.

==== Rules governing the hoisting of the flag ====
The flag is hoisted on all Egyptian governmental buildings on Fridays, national holidays, the opening session of the House of Representatives, and any other occasions as determined by the Minister of the Interior. The flag is hoisted daily on border posts, customs buildings, Egyptian consulates, and embassies overseas on Revolution Day (July 23), and other national holidays, as well as during the visit of the Egyptian President to the country hosting the diplomatic mission.

Abusing the flag in any way is a criminal offense and is punishable under law as it implies the contempt of the power of the state. Penal provisions also govern abuse of foreign flags or national emblems of other countries.

== See also ==
- Coat of arms of Egypt
- Flags of the Egyptian Armed Forces
- List of Egyptian flags
- Pan-Arab colors
- Flag of Iraq
- Flag of Sudan
- Flag of the United Arab Emirates
- Flag of the United Arab Republic
- Flag of Yemen, based on Egyptian Republican tricolor

== Sources ==
- "Egypt Flag". Egypt State Information Service. Archived from the original on 2010-11-13.
