= Arab Liberation Flag =

Tricolor Flag used in the Arab World

The Arab Liberation Flag (Arabic: علم التحرير العربي) is a pan-Arab tricolor flag originally adopted by the Egyptian Free Officers movement following the 1952 Egyptian revolution. The tricolor flag consists of horizontal stripes in red, white, and black. The Arab Liberation Flag became a symbol of Arab nationalism, republicanism, Arab socialism and Nasserism, as well as the basis for numerous flags in the Arab world. Today, its variations are used as the national flags of Egypt, Iraq, Yemen, and Sudan, and were formerly used by Syria and Libya.

== Symbolism ==
The Arab Liberation Flag borrowed the pan-Arab colors from the 1916 flag of the Arab Revolt. While the colors of black, white, red, and green on the original Arab revolt flag symbolized historical Arab dynasties, namely the Abbasids, Umayyads, Hashemites, and Islam (or possibly the Fatimids), respectively, the Arab Liberation Flag colors also had different meanings. The black stood for the experience of colonial oppression endured by Arabs, the red symbolized the sacrifices and bloodshed in the fight for liberation from colonial rule, and white signified peace and bright future envisioned for independent Arab states.

The Arab Liberation Flag was often modified by states to include symbols such as the Eagle of Saladin, as seen on the flag of Egypt, or green stars, as seen on the former flags of North Yemen, Iraq and Syria. The Eagle of Saladin on the Egyptian flag represents republicanism, while the two green stars on the former Syrian flag used from 1980 to 2024 represented the two former constituents of the United Arab Republic: Egypt and Syria. To distinguish its flag from that of the United Arab Republic with two green stars, North Yemen used a single green star in the center. The flag featuring three green stars, used by Iraq from 1963 to 2008 and by Syria from 1963 to 1972, symbolized aspirations for unity between Egypt, Syria, and Iraq, as well as the three core pillars of Ba'athism: unity, freedom, and socialism.

The Arab Liberation Flag became a symbol of republicanism and anti-imperialism within the context of the Arab Cold War, as various left-wing Arab socialist republics affiliated with either Nasserism or Ba'athism aligned themselves with these ideals, in contrast to the Arab monarchies, which influential Egyptian president Gamal Abdel Nasser portrayed as complicit in facilitating Western neo-colonial influence in the Arab world.

== History ==
The Arab Liberation Flag was first adopted by the Egyptian Free Officers as a result of the 1952 Egyptian revolution led by Arab nationalist officers Mohammed Naguib and Gamal Abdel Nasser, which resulted in the overthrow of King Farouk and the abolition of the Egyptian monarchy. It was later adopted by Ba'athist regimes following successful coups in both Iraq and Syria in 1963, as well as in Yemen in 1962 and Libya in 1969 after revolutions and coups inspired or supported by the United Arab Republic.

Libya ceased using the flag associated with the Federation of Arab Republics in 1977 as a result of Muammar Gaddafi's decision to change Libya's official name to the Socialist People’s Libyan Arab Jamahiriya and adopt a plain green flag. As a result of the fall of the Assad regime following a rebel offensive in 2024, the Syrian flag was changed back to the "independence flag," which the Syrian opposition used throughout the Syrian civil war, featuring a horizontal tricolor of green, white, and black, with three red five-pointed stars at the center.

== Derivatives from the Arab Liberation Flag ==
=== Current national flags ===
Flag of Egypt since 1984

Flag of Iraq since 2008

Flag of Yemen since 1990

Flag of Sudan since 1970

=== Former national flags ===
Flag of Egypt (1953–1958)

Flag of the United Arab Republic (1958–1971), North Yemen (1962), Egypt (1971–1972), and Syria (1980–2024)

Flag of North Yemen (1962–1990)

Flag of Iraq (1963–1991)

Flag of Syria (1963–1972)

Flag of South Yemen (1967–1990)

Flag of Libya (1969–1972)

Flag of the Federation of Arab Republics (1972–1977), used by Egypt (1972–1984), Syria (1972–1980), and Libya (1972–1977)

Flag of the Arab Islamic Republic (proposed union of Libya and Tunisia in 1974; never implemented)

Flag of Iraq (1991–2004)

Flag of Iraq (2004–2008)

== See also ==
- Flag of the Arab Revolt
- Pan-Arab colors
- List of Arab flags
- Pan-Arabism
- Flag of the United Arab Republic
- Flag of the Federation of Arab Republics
- Flag of the German Empire, which features a similar design but with the colors in reverse order
