= Emblem of Yemen =

Versions
- Escutcheon

- Armiger: Republic of Yemen
- Adopted: 1990
- Shield: Per fess argent and barry wavy argent and azure, overall a crenellated wall in fess throughout, issuing therefrom to chief a coffee branch leaved and fructed proper (Note: There is no official blazon for the shield of the Republic of Yemen, it is described as "a drawing representing the Ma’rib Dam and the coffee tree is engraved on it" on the "Presidency Council Decision By Law No. (2) of 1990 Regarding the emblem of the Republic of Yemen and its official seal".)
- Supporters: An Eagle of Saladin proper
- Motto: الجمهورية اليمنية ("The Republic of Yemen")
- Other elements: Two flags of Yemen

The Emblem of Yemen depicts a golden eagle of Saladin with a scroll between its claws. On the scroll is written the name of the country in Arabic: الجمهورية اليمنية ('The Yemeni Republic'). The chest of the eagle contains a shield that depicts a coffee plant and the Marib Dam, with seven blue wavy stripes below. The flagstaffs on the right and left of the eagle hold the flag of Yemen.

== Historical emblems ==
=== North Yemen ===
From 1945 to 1990, Yemen was split into North and South. The North had an emblem more similar to the present day one, and its shield has similarities with the shield of the former Mutawakkilite Kingdom of Yemen.

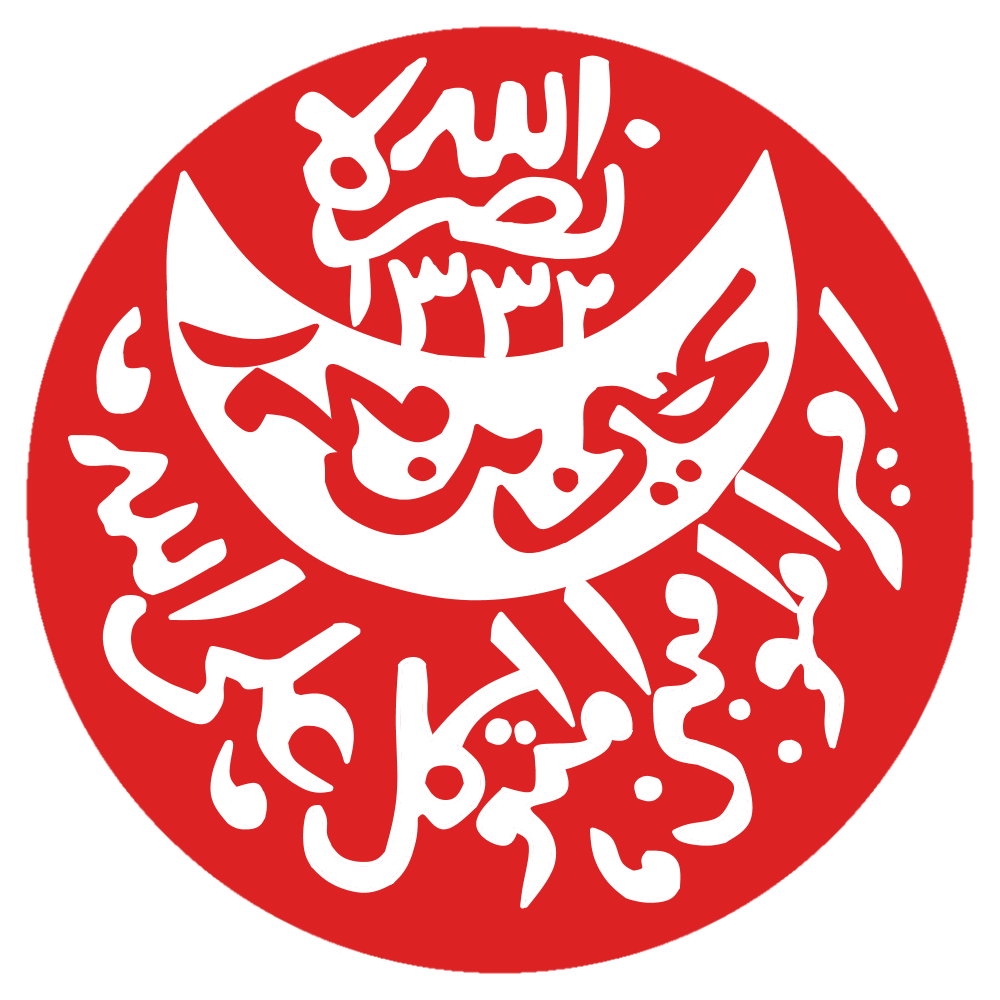
Emblem of Yahya Muhammad Hamid ed-Din

Coat of arms of the Mutawakkilite Kingdom of Yemen (1918–1970)

Coat of arms of the Yemen Arab Republic (1962–1966)

Coat of arms of the Yemen Arab Republic (1966–1974)

Coat of arms of the Yemen Arab Republic (1974–1990)

=== South Yemen ===
The South had an emblem with the pan-Arab "Eagle of Saladin" (similar to the coats of arms of Egypt, Iraq, and the former coats of arms of Libya and Syria).

Coat of arms of the People's Republic of Southern Yemen (1967–1970)

Coat of arms of the People's Democratic Republic of Yemen (1970–1990)

Coat of arms of the People's Democratic Republic of Yemen (1970-1990; Silver version)

Emblem of the Yemeni Socialist Party

=== Federation of South Arabia ===
Emblem of the Federation of Arab Emirates of the South (1959–1962)

Emblem of the Federation of South Arabia (1962–1967)

==== States ====
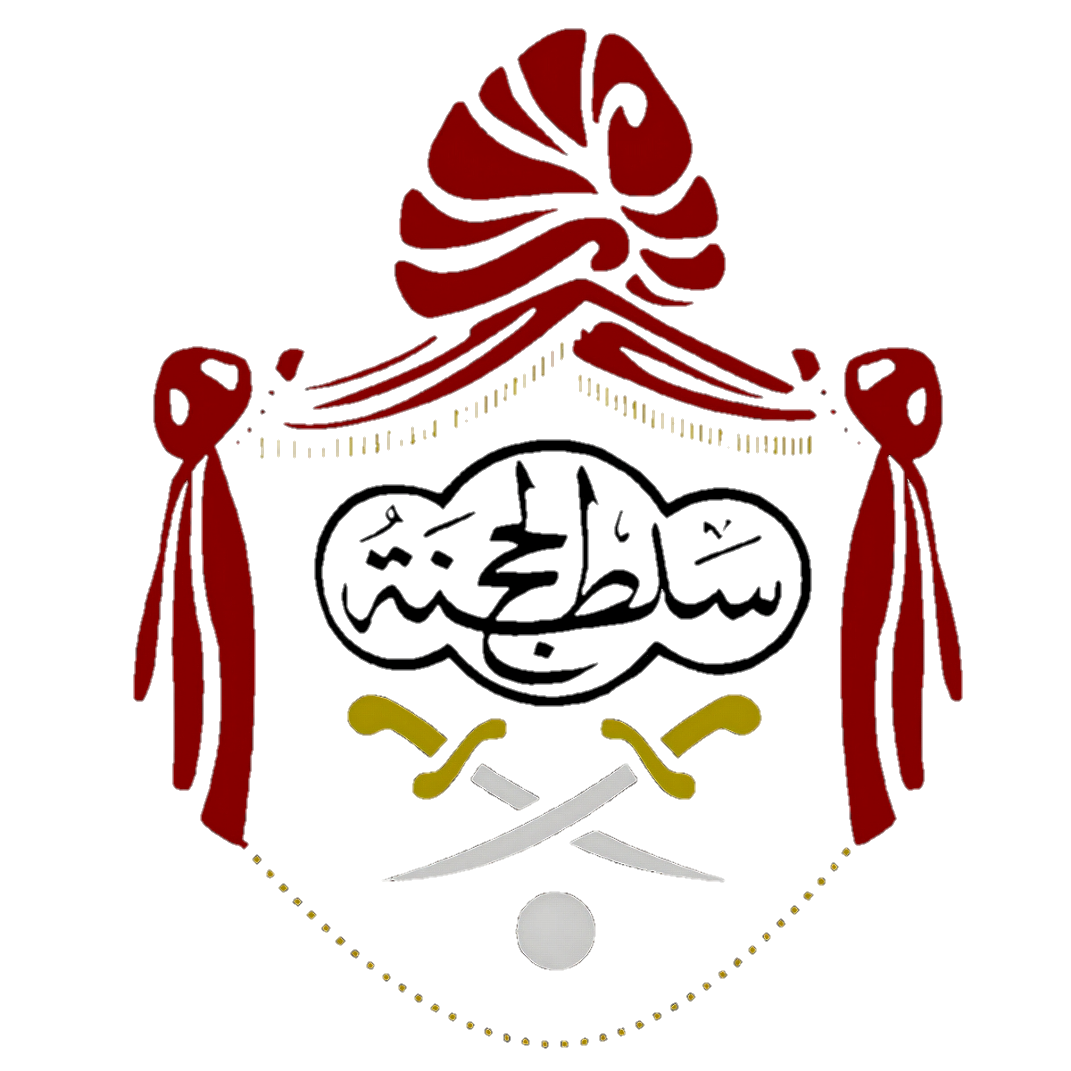
Emblem of the Sultanate of Lahej

=== Protectorate of South Arabia ===
Emblem of the State of Upper Yafa before 1967

Emblem of the Kathiri State of Seiyun (?–1967)

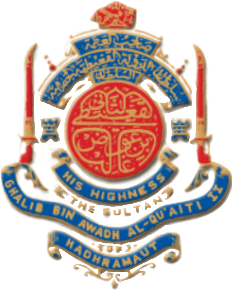
Emblem of the Quaiti State of Shihr and Mukalla (?–1967)

=== Aden Colony ===
Badge of the Aden Colony (1937–1963)

== Government ==
Emblem of the Ministry of Interior

Emblem of the Republic of Yemen Armed Forces

Emblem of the Yemeni Army

Emblem of the Yemeni Navy

== See also ==
- Coat of arms of Egypt
- Coat of arms of Iraq
- Coat of arms of Palestine
- Coat of arms of Syria
- Coat of arms of Sudan
- Coat of arms of Libya
- Eagle of Saladin
- National symbols of Yemen
