= Flag of the United Arab Republic =

United Arab Republic
- "The Arab Banner"
- Use: Civil and state flag, civil and state ensign
- Proportion: 2:3
- Adopted: 22 February 1958
- Relinquished: 28 September 1961 (Syria); 1 January 1972 (Egypt)
- Design: A horizontal tricolour of red, white, and black charged with two green five-pointed stars in the center.
- Designed by: National Union

The Flag of the United Arab Republic (Arabic: علم الجمهورية العربية المتحدة) was adopted following the unification of Egypt and Syria into a single state known as the United Arab Republic on 22 February 1958. Syria left the union on 28 September 1961 following the 1961 Syrian coup d'état. Egypt would continue to use the name and symbols of the United Arab Republic until 1972. The flag was readopted by Ba'athist Syria in 1980 and remained in use until the fall of the Assad regime in 2024, symbolizing Syria's continued commitment to Arab unity.

== Design ==
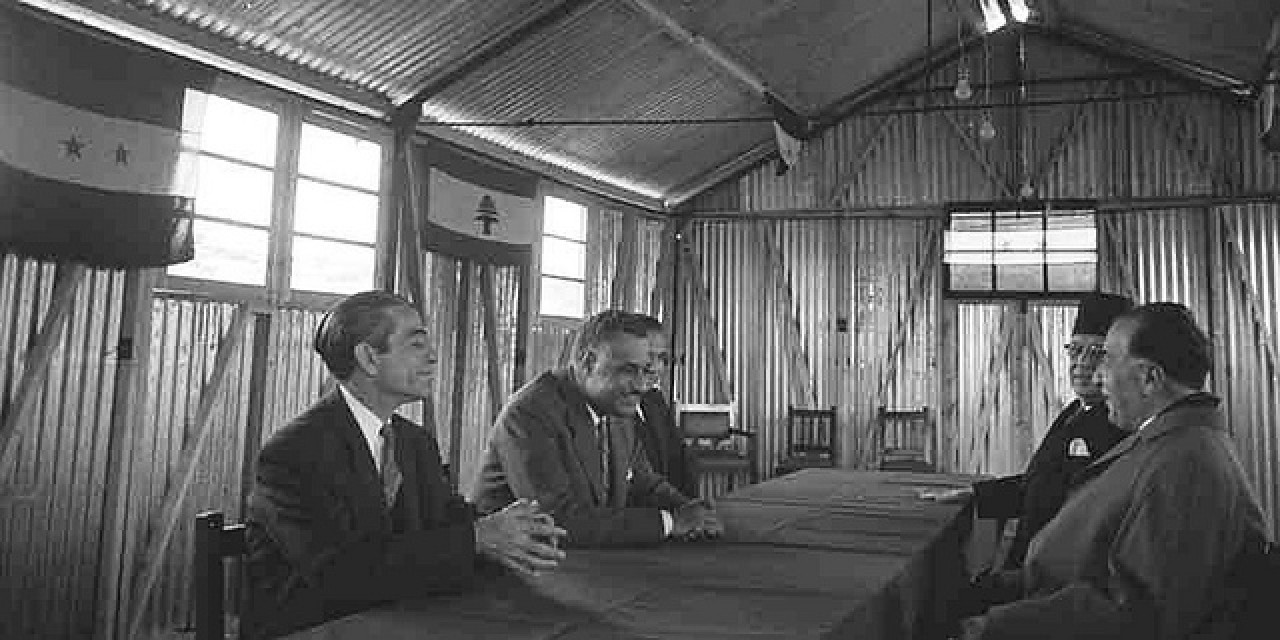
The flag seen behind Gamal Abdel Nasser during a meeting with Lebanese leader Fouad Chehab

The flag consisted of a horizontal triband of red, white, and black, with two green five-pointed stars centred on the white band. The colors were taken from the Arab Liberation Flag that was used in Egypt since the 1952 Egyptian revolution. The black stood for the experience of colonial oppression endured by Arabs, the red symbolized the sacrifices and bloodshed in the fight for liberation from colonial rule, and white signified peace and bright future envisioned for independent Arab states. The two stars represented Egypt and Syria, and their green color represented Islam.

== Later use ==

Iraq and Syria adopted a variation of the UAR's flag with a third star to represent their aspirations to join the United Arab Republic in 1963

Egypt continued to use the flag of the United Arab Republic until 1972, after it changed its official name to the Arab Republic of Egypt. It was briefly used by North Yemen between 27 September and 1 November 1962 during the North Yemen civil war and was used as the flag of the Syrian Arab Republic under Ba'athist rule between 1980 and 2024.

In 1963, after the agreement over the formation of a United Arab Republic, both Iraq and Syria adopted a flag that was similar but with three green stars, representing the aspiration that Iraq and Syria would join a renewed United Arab Republic with Egypt. Under the agreement, the flag was planned to be the federation's flag.

The UAR flag was readopted by the Ba'ath Party of Syria as the flag of Syria used from 1980 to 2024

The flag of Iraq used from 1963 until 2008 and still remains in use as a symbol of various movements in the country, a similar 1:2 version was also briefly used in Syria

The flag of Iraq after 2008 retains the basic layout and colors of the previous flag

Flag of North Yemen used from 1962 until reunification, was based on the UAR flag due to North Yemen's former position in the United Arab States

Flag of the Iraqi-backed Democratic Revolutionary Front for the Liberation of Arabistan in Iran, first used during the Iran–Iraq War

== Armed forces flags ==
Army flag of the United Arab Republic (1958–1961) and Egypt (1961–1972)

Naval Ensign of the United Arab Republic (1958–1961) and Egypt (1961–1972)

Air Force Ensign of the United Arab Republic (1958–1961) and Egypt (1961–1972)

== See also ==
- Coat of arms of the United Arab Republic
- Coat of arms of Ba'athist Syria
- Walla Zaman Ya Selahy
- Flag of Egypt
  - List of Egyptian flags
- Flag of Syria
  - List of Syrian flags
- Flag of the Federation of Arab Republics
