= Coat of arms of Palestine =

Coat of arms of the State of Palestine
- Armiger: State of Palestine
- Shield: Tierced per pale Vert Argent and Sable in chief a pile Gules
- Supporter: Eagle of Saladin
- Motto: فلسطين Filasṭīn 'Palestine'

The coat of arms of Palestine may refer to the emblem used by the State of Palestine, the Palestinian National Authority (PNA), or by the Palestine Liberation Organization (PLO).

== Official description ==
The government of Palestine describes the coat of arms as follows:

The Palestinian emblem is an eagle covered by the Palestinian flag, and it is similar to the emblems of Egypt and Iraq with a difference in the colors of the flags.

This emblem appeared at the beginning of the era of the Ayyubid state, which was founded by Sultan Salah al-Din al-Ayyubi in Egypt after the elimination of the Fatimid caliphate. It has become a symbol of the Ayyubid state since the era of Sultan Salahuddin al-Ayyubi, and represents Arab victories.

The eagle looks to the right with its head held high.

== PNA and state emblem ==
The emblem used by the Palestinian National Authority as well as the State of Palestine features the pan-Arab colors of the Palestinian flag on a shield carried by the Eagle of Saladin. Below it flies a scroll with the Arabic text "فلسطين", "Palestine".

An alternate version stating "السلطة الفلسطينية" or "The Palestinian Authority" was used by the Palestinian National Authority, alongside the version stating "Palestine", but this was discontinued following the upgrade of the State of Palestine to a non-member state status in the United Nations on 29 November 2012 and the renaming of the Palestinian National Authority to "State of Palestine" by presidential decree in January 2013.

== Gallery ==
Most common version.

Alternate stylised black version.

Alternate stylised version.

Version stating "Palestinian Authority" instead of "Palestine".

Variation appearing on the Palestinian Presidential Standard.

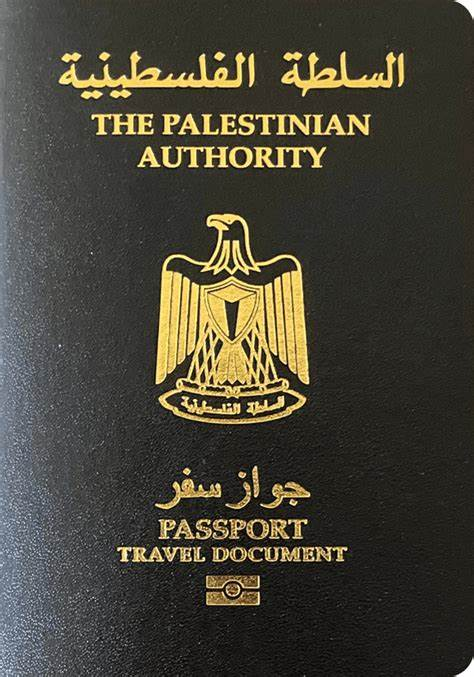
Emblem as coat of arms on Palestinian passport.

=== Gaza Strip ===
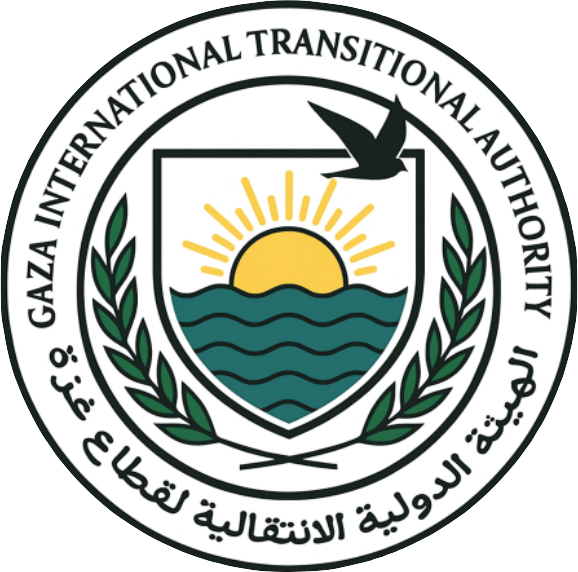
Logo designed for the proposed Gaza International Transitional Authority (2025)

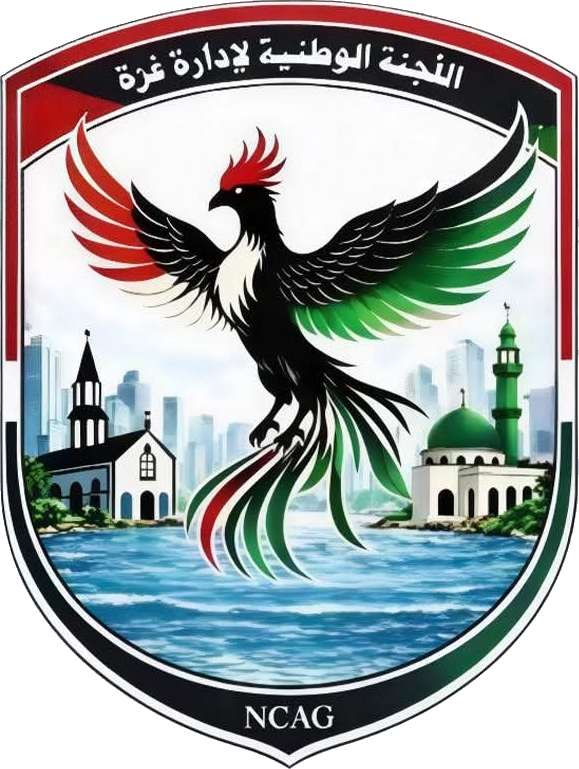
First prototype logo for the National Committee for the Administration of Gaza

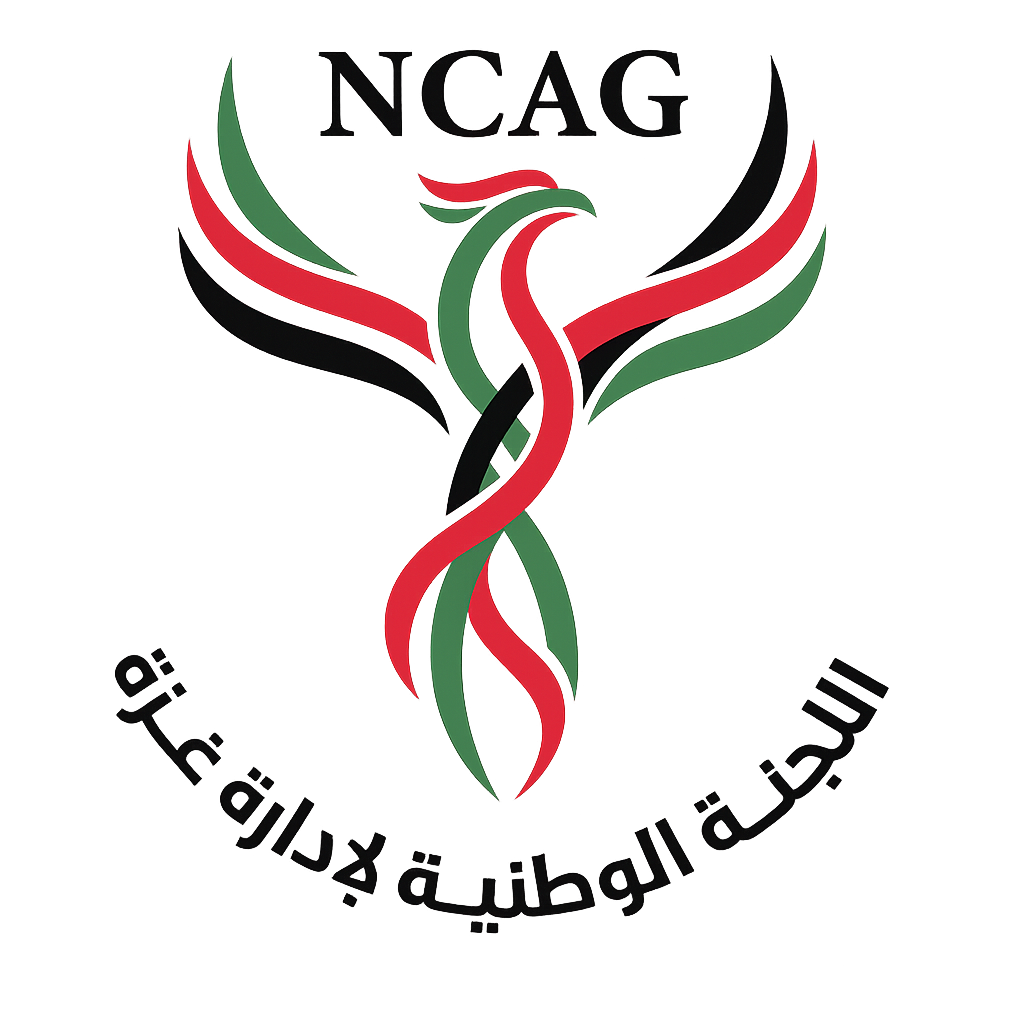
Second prototype logo for the National Committee for the Administration of Gaza

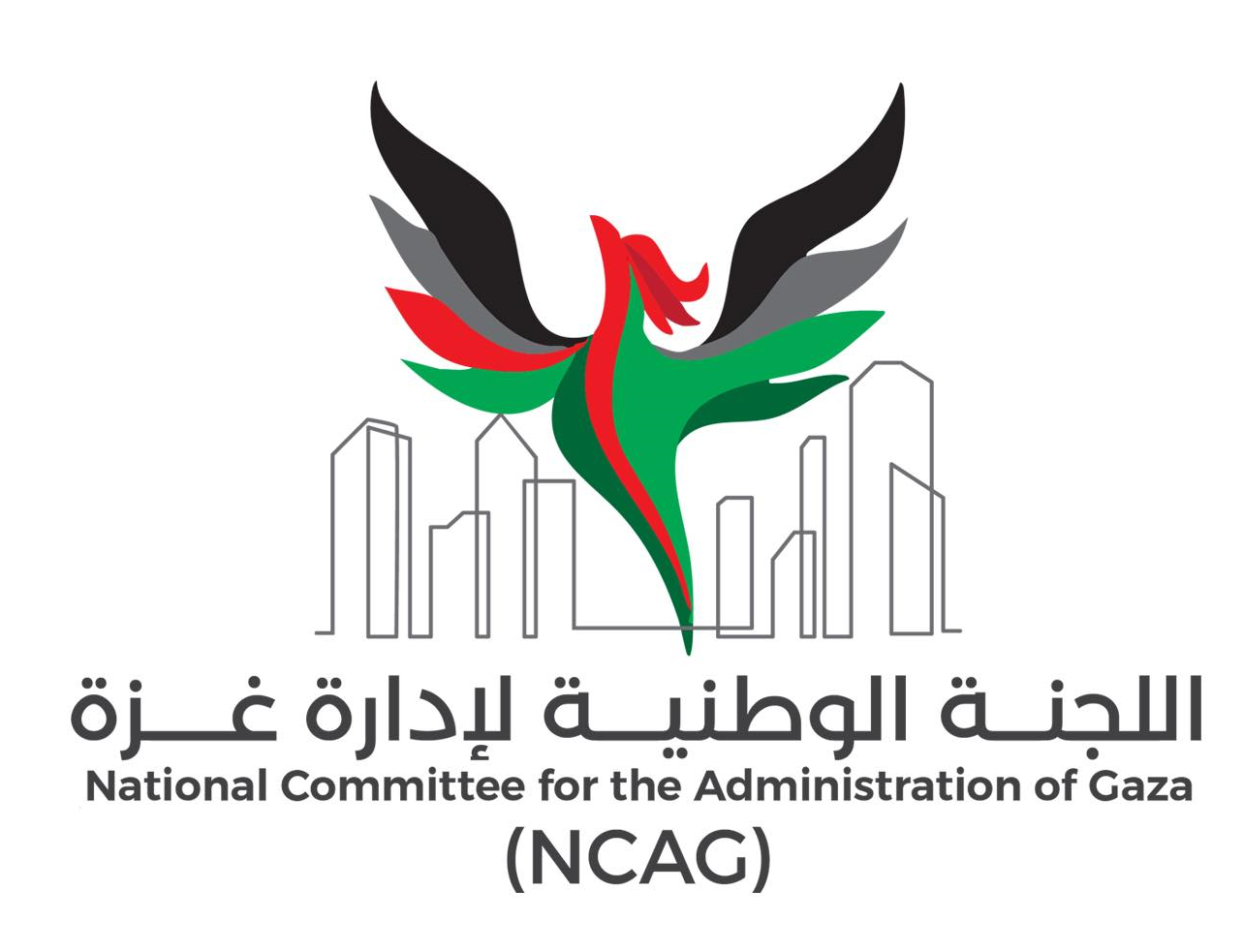
Third prototype logo for the National Committee for the Administration of Gaza

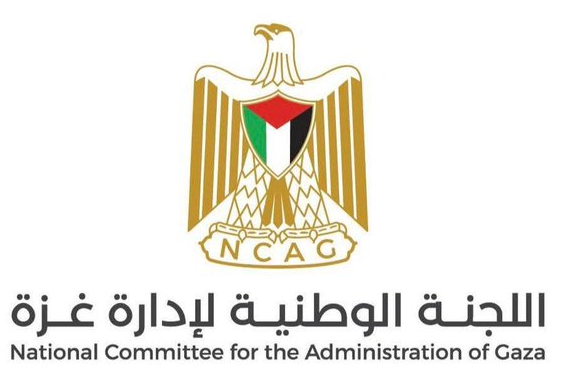
Fourth prototype logo for the National Committee for the Administration of Gaza

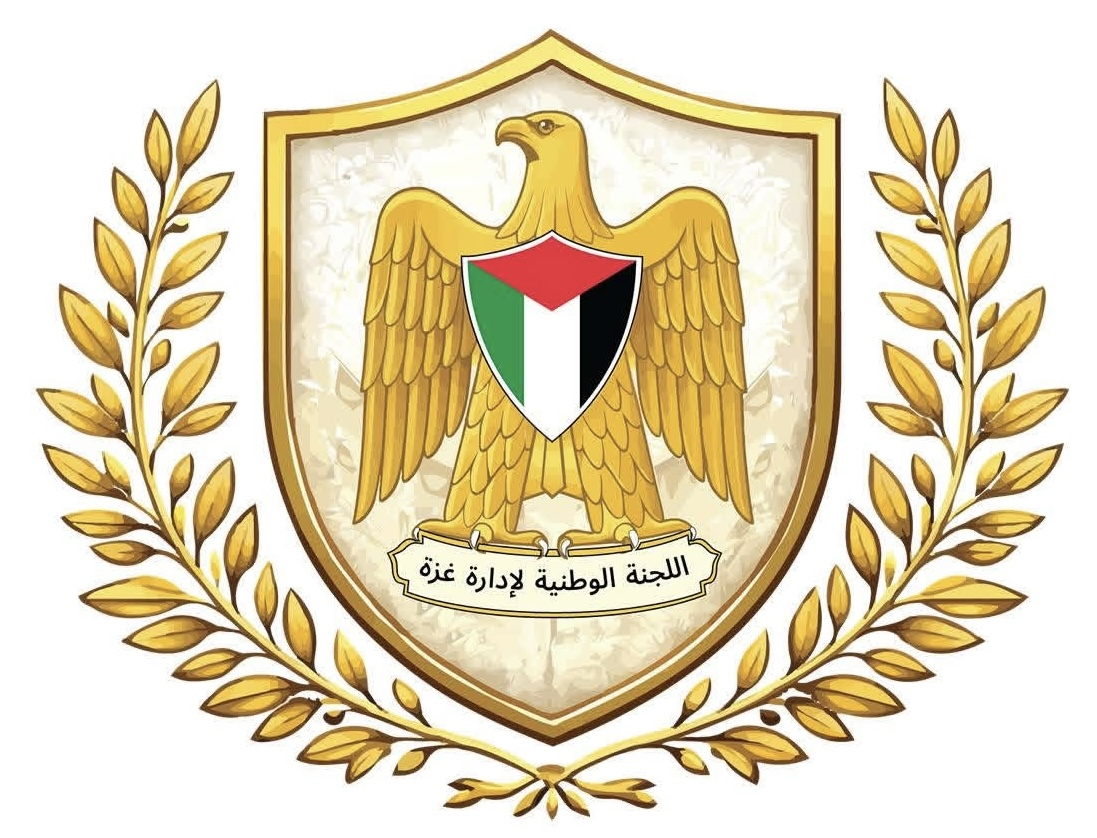
Logo of the National Committee for the Administration of Gaza

== See also ==
- Public Seal of Mandatory Palestine
- Coat of arms of Iraq
- Coat of arms of Egypt
- Coat of arms of Syria
- Coat of arms of Sudan
- Coat of arms of Libya
- Coat of arms of Yemen
- Eagle of Saladin
