= Flag of the Federation of Arab Republics =

1972–84 flag

Federation of Arab Republics
- Adopted: 1972
- Relinquished: 1977 (Libya); 1980 (Syria); 1984 (Egypt)
- Design: A horizontal tricolour of red, white, and black; charged with golden Hawk of Quraish.

The flag of the Federation of Arab Republics was the flag of Egypt, Libya and Syria from 1972–1977. The flag is a horizontal tricolour of red, white and black with a golden Hawk of Quraish placed on the center on the white stripe.

The flag was abandoned in Libya in 1977 after Muammar Gaddafi established the Socialist People's Libyan Arab Jamahiriya and adopted a green flag.

Egypt and Syria continued to use the flag of the Federation of Arab Republics until the early 1980s. Syria adopted the former United Arab Republic flag in 1980 and Egypt in 1984. Syria continued to use the 1980 flag until 2024.

== Flags of member states ==
Syria used the flag of the federation unaltered. Egypt and Libya added the name of the state below the coat of arms.

Egyptian flag used until 1984, 7 years after the dissolution

Libyan flag used until 1977

Syrian flag used until 1980, 3 years after the dissolution

== Gallery ==
Egyptian flag before 1972

Libyan flag before 1972

Syrian flag before 1972
Egyptian flag after 1984

Libyan flag after 1977

Syrian flag after 1980

== See also ==
- Coat of arms of the Federation of Arab Republics
- Flag of Egypt
- Flag of Libya
- Flag of Syria
- Hawk of Quraish
- Flag of the United Arab Republic
