= National Emblem of Libya =

Emblem of Libya

Versions
- Emblem used for passports since 2013
- Armiger: Libya
- Adopted: 15 March 2021
- Shield: Crescent moon and star
- Motto: حكومة الوحدة الوطنية – دولة ليبيا (Arabic) "Government of National Unity – State of Libya")

Since 2011, (Note: Following the collapse of the Gaddafi regime in the Libyan Civil War.) Libya currently does not have an official national emblem. The Constitutional Declaration issued by the National Transitional Council in August 2011 defines the flag of Libya, but does not make any provisions for a coat of arms.

A new biometric Libyan passport was revealed in February 2013. The cover of the new passport depicts a star and crescent as its central feature, as found in the flag of Libya. Thus, the symbol can be considered a de facto emblem for Libya.

The Government of National Unity, established in March 2021 has adopted an official seal incorporating a crescent moon and star and the name of the state and government in Arabic.

== History ==
=== Pre-independence ===
Cyrenaica under Mamluk Sultanate (1260–1517)

Tripoli under Spanish Rule (1510–1516)

Tripoli under Spanish Rule (1516–1530)

Tripoli under The Knights Hospitaller (1530–1551)

Ottoman Empire (1846–1882)

Cyrenaica and Kufra under Egypt Eyalet (1854–1867)

Ottoman Tripolitania (1864–1911)

Cyrenaica and Kufra under The Khedivate of Egypt (1867–1914)

Ottoman Empire (1882–1911)

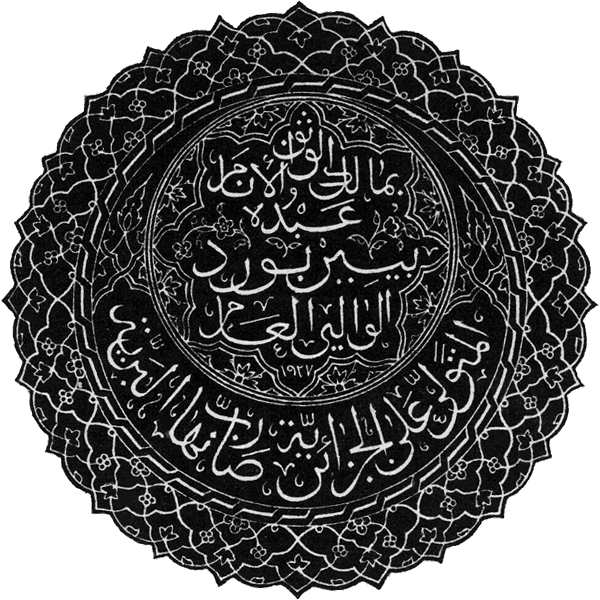
French Algeria (1900–1919)

Kingdom of Italy (1911–1929)

Italian Tripolitania (1911–1934)

Italian Cyrenaica (1911–1934)

Cyrenaica and Kufra under The Sultanate of Egypt (1914–1922)

Kufra (Sarra Triangle) under The Kingdom of Egypt (1922–1934)

Kufra (Sarra Triangle) under The Anglo-Egyptian Sudan (1922–1934)

Kingdom of Italy (1929–1943)

Italian Libya (1940–1943)

Free France (Fezzan-Ghadames Military Territory) (1943–1944)

United Kingdom (British Military Administration of Libya) (1943–1951)

Provisional Government of the French Republic (Fezzan-Ghadames Military Territory) (1944–1946)

French Fourth Republic (Fezzan-Ghadames Military Territory) (1946–1951)

=== Kingdom of Libya (1951–1969) ===
The coat of arms of the Kingdom of Libya was used from 1952 to 1969. A royal decree from 1952 described the coat of arms of the United Kingdom of Libya as follows:

The emblem of the United Kingdom of Libya would be a silver crescent and star, resting on a background of black surrounded by a green frame; all crested with a small golden crown, standing on a black base; all in the centre of a red mantle and surrounded by 9 (nine) golden stars, the mantle decorated with golden ornaments; all crested with a crown of a golden diadem with five hoops set with stars and bearing the crescent and star.

Royal arms of the Kingdom of Libya 1952–1969

=== Libya under Gaddafi (1969–2011) ===
In 1970, Libya adopted as its coat of arms the Eagle of Saladin, which had become a symbol of Arab nationalism following its prominence in the Egyptian revolution of 1952, after which it was used in the coat of arms of Egypt, the United Arab Republic, Yemen, Iraq, and Palestine. In 1972, Libya's participation in the Federation of Arab Republics led both it and Egypt to abandon the Eagle of Saladin, and to adopt as their coats of arms the Hawk of Quraish, the emblem of the tribe of Muhammad used by Syria, which became the coat of arms of the Federation. On Libya's exit from the Federation in 1977 followed by its adaption of Gaddafi's system of Jamahiriya, the Hawk of the Quraish was retained, but modified with the green flag that Libya also adopted at that time, alongside modifying the hawk to now face dexter instead of sinister.

Libyan Arab Republic (1969–1972)

Libyan Arab Republic within the Federation of Arab Republics (1972–1977)

Great Socialist People's Libyan Arab Jamahiriya, which retains the name Federation of Arab Republics (1977–2011)

=== Libya under the National Transitional Council (2011–2012) ===
The National Transitional Council, supported as the legitimate administration by the United Nations since September 2011, used a seal that depicts a crescent moon and star, represented in the colors of the Libyan flag (red, black, and green), with the names of the council المجلس الوطني الانتقالي Al-Majlis al-Waṭanī l-Intiqālī ('The Transitional National Council') and of the state ليبيا Lībiyā ('Libya') displayed in Arabic and English.

The interim Prime Minister's office and departments of the interim government used a different seal. The main charge of this emblem is an outline map of Libya in the design of the Libyan flag.

First seal of the National Transitional Council (March–April 2011)

Second seal of the National Transitional Council

=== Libya under the General National Congress (2012–2014) ===
The General National Congress which served as the legislature of Libya between 2012 and 2014 had adopted which depicted a crescent moon and star surrounded by the name of the congress written in Arabic and English. It was used to certify documents issued and laws passed by the congress.

An emblem was also adopted for governmental purposes and formed the basis of the seals used by the Prime Minister's office and the departments of the Libyan government. This emblem consisted of a crescent moon and star surrounded by olive branches similar to those found on the emblem of the United Nations.

Seal used by the General National Congress (2012–2014)

Seal of the prime minister of Libya

Emblem of Libya under the General National Congress

=== Libya under the House of Representatives (2014–2016) ===
The House of Representatives elected in 2014 and currently based in Tobruk has adopted a seal for official use. This depicts a crescent moon, arches and the name House of Representatives in English and Arabic. The seals and emblems adopted for the Libyan government during the term of the General National Congress remained in use during this period.

Seal used by the House of Representatives

Seal of the prime minister of Libya

Emblem of Libya, also used under the General National Congress

=== Libya under the Government of National Accord (2016–2021) ===
The Government of National Accord was formed as a result of the Libyan Political Agreement signed in December 2015 and has been endorsed by the United Nations Security Council as the sole legitimate government of Libya. The Government of National Accord uses a seal depicting its name and the name of the state in Arabic and English surrounding a crescent moon and star.

Emblem of the Government of National Accord

==== Emblems of the rival Tobruk-based Government (2016–2021) ====
A rival Tobruk-based government was formed in Tobruk, led by Khalifa Haftar, used the Hawk of Quraish as its emblem with the shield modified with the Libyan flag.

Seal used by the House of Representatives

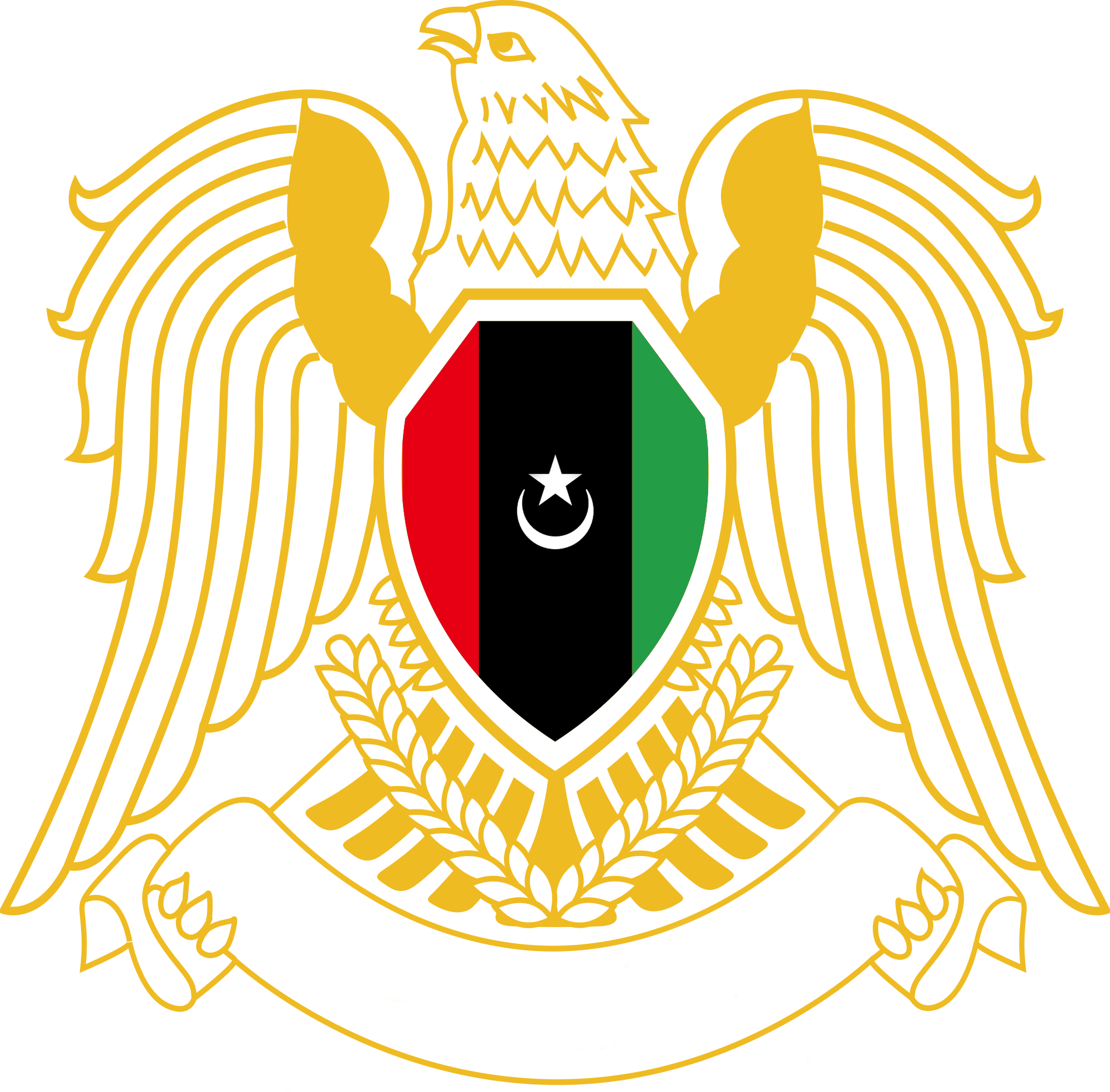
Emblem used by the Tobruk-based government in Libya

=== Libya under the Government of National Unity (2021–present) ===
A Government of National Unity was formed in March 2021 following on from meetings of the Libyan Political Dialogue Forum. The unity government has adopted an official seal incorporating a crescent moon and star and surrounded by the words Arabic: حكومة الوحدة الوطنية – دولة ليبيا ('Government of National Unity – State of Libya'). The seal was designed by Adly al-Akkari.

Seal of the Government of National Unity

==== Symbol of the rival Government of National Stability (2022–present) ====
A rival Government of National Stability was established in Tobruk with support from the House of Representatives and the Libyan National Army. The GNS has claimed power over Libya in competition with the GNU.

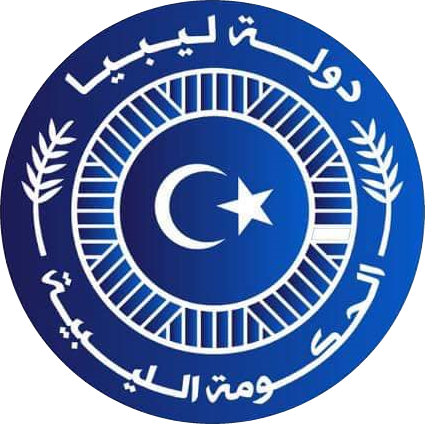
Logo of the Government of National Stability

== See also ==
- Flag of Libya
- National Anthem of Libya
