= Coat of arms of the United Arab Republic =

- Armiger: United Arab Republic
- Shield: Tierced per pale, Gules, Argent and Sable; on the centre pale two Mullets of five points Vert
- Supporters: The Eagle of Saladin displayed and inverted Or.
- Motto: الجمهورية العربية المتحدة (al-Ǧumhūriyyah al-ʿArabiyyah al-Muttaḥidah; Arabic for "United Arab Republic")

The coat of arms used by the United Arab Republic featured the Pan-Arab colours of the flag of the United Arab Republic (in vertical form) on a shield carried by the Eagle of Saladin. Below, a green scroll has the Arabic text for "United Arab Republic" (الجمهورية العربية المتحدة, al-Ǧumhūriyyah al-ʿArabiyyah al-Muttaḥidah).

After the union of Egypt and Syria ended in 1961, Egypt retained the name "United Arab Republic" and continued to use this coat of arms, until the Federation of Arab Republics project caused a change in 1972.

== Gallery ==
Egyptian arms before 1958

Syrian arms before 1958
Egyptian arms after 1961 (Egypt used the UAR name and symbols until 1972)

Syrian arms after 1961

== See also ==
- Flag of the United Arab Republic
- Walla Zaman Ya Selahy
- Coat of arms of Egypt
- Coat of arms of Syria
- Coat of arms of the Federation of Arab Republics
