= Flag of Yemen =

Republic of Yemen
- Use: National flag and ensign
- Proportion: 2:3
- Adopted: 22 May 1990; 36 years ago
- Design: A horizontal tricolour of red, white, and black

The national flag of Yemen (Arabic: علم اليمن, romanized: 'Alam al-Yaman) is the official flag of the Republic of Yemen. It was adopted on 22 May 1990, the day of the unification of Yemen. It resembles the Arab Liberation Flag that was used by the National Liberation Front. It served as the derivation for the flags of both North and South Yemen prior to their unification, and the distinctive elements of both former flags were removed in choosing the flag post-unification.

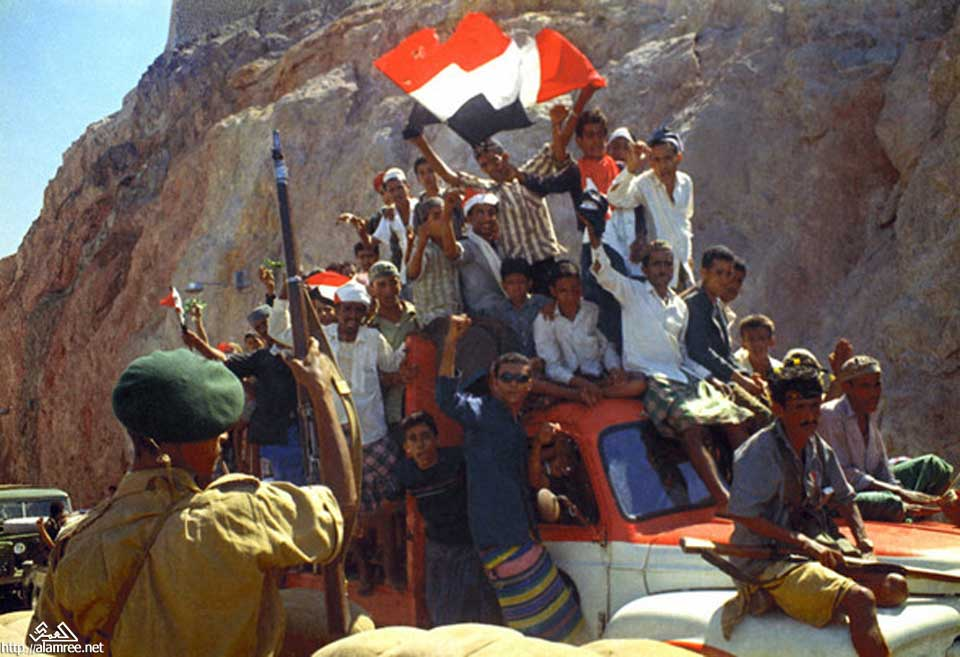
National Liberation Front supporters waving their flags as part of the celebrations, demonstrations and mass marches after the British Withdrawal from Aden

According to the official description, the red stands for unity and the bloodshed of martyrs, the white for a bright future, and the black for the supposed dark past. The flag is graphically identical to the flag of the Libyan Arab Republic from 1969 to 1972.

== Design ==
=== Construction sheet ===
Construction sheet of the flag

=== Meaning behind the colours ===
Colour	Represents
Red	The blood of martyrs who struggled to achieve independence and unity.
White	A bright future.
Black	The dark days of the past.

=== Colour shades ===
Yemen	Red	White	Black
Pantone	PMS 032	–	PMS Black
RGB	206, 17, 38	255, 255, 255	0, 0, 0
Hexadecimal	#CE1126	#FFFFFF	#000000
CMYK	0, 90, 76, 0	0, 0, 0, 0	0, 0, 0, 100

== Historical pre-unification flags ==
Before Yemen was unified into the present-day Republic of Yemen in 1990, it existed as two separate countries, North and South Yemen.

=== North Yemen ===
==== Kingdom of Yemen ====
The Kingdom of Yemen was never a British protectorate, but was nominally part of the Ottoman Empire until 1918 and was independent thereafter. Independently, here were two British protectorates (known as the Eastern and Western Aden Protectorates) which contained 24 sultanates, emirates and sheikhdoms in the hinterland of Aden.

The flag was in use until 1962 when the imam was overthrown and the Yemen Arab Republic was established. A civil war between republicans (supported by Egypt) and royalists (supported by Saudi Arabia) continued until 1970, with the royalist side continuing to use the flag of the kingdom.

Kingdom of Yemen
(1918–1923)

Kingdom of Yemen
(1923–1927)

Kingdom of Yemen
(1927–1970)

United Arab States which North Yemen was a part of
(1958–1961)

==== Yemen Arab Republic ====
North Yemen
- Use: Historical
- Proportion: 2:3
- Adopted: November 1, 1962; 64 years ago (slight adaptation from September 26, 1962)
- Relinquished: May 22, 1990; 36 years ago (Yemeni unification)
- Design: A horizontal tricolour of red, white, and black with a green five-pointed star in the centre

When the Egyptian-backed Yemen Arab Republic revolted against the imamate in 1962, a version of the Arab Liberation Flag with one green star in the center of the white band which symbolized unity and independence.

Yemen Arab Republic
(1962–1990)

Vertical standard

=== South Yemen ===
The flag of the People's Democratic Republic of Yemen in the South was a version of the Arab Liberation Flag with a light blue triangle which represented the people under the leadership of the National Liberation Front, with a red star next to the hoist representing the NLF itself and later the Socialist Party. The flag was adopted on 30 November 1967 when South Yemen declared independence from the United Kingdom until the Yemeni unification in 1990. It was used again for a few months in 1994 during the existence of the Democratic Republic of Yemen.

People's Democratic Republic of Yemen (1967–1990)

People's Democratic Republic of Yemen (1967–1990), Presidential Standard

Yemeni Socialist Party

Flag of South Yemen, vertical standard

==== Pre-independence flags ====
Before the independence, South Yemen had different flags according to political entity that belonged:

- Federation of South Arabia: formed in 1959 as a British protectorate, adopted a flag of 7 horizontal bands, of colors black, green and blue, and yellow between they; above of all a white star and crescent moon. In 1962 the star was slightly modified.
  - For the states flag, see States of Federation of South Arabia
Flag of South Arabia Federation (1962-1967)

Flag of South Arabia Federation (1959-1962)

- Aden Colony: in 1937 adopted as naval ensign the Blue Ensign with the Union Jack, and a distinctive emblem of a vessel at sea.
Ensign of Aden Colony
- Protectorate of South Arabia: used the British flag as general emblem, but their former Sultanates and states members had its own flags
Mahra Sultanate

Kathiri

Qu'aiti Sultanate

Upper Yafa

== See also ==
- Emblem of Yemen
- Pan-Arab colors
- Flag of the Arab Revolt
- Flag of the German Empire, which features a similar design but with the colors in reverse order
- Arab Liberation Flag
  - Flag of Egypt
  - Flag of Iraq
  - Flag of Sudan
