= Emblem of Syria =

Versions
- Variant with outline, used by the Syrian Armed Forces and seen on the Syrian pound
- Armiger: Syria
- Adopted: 3 July 2025 (Note: The previous de facto emblem is still in use on old documents, such as the Constitutional Declaration of the Syrian Arab Republic.)
- Shield: a tan-coloured eagle, facing to its right dexter, with three five-pointed stars arranged in an arc above its head, the tail contains five feathers and the wing contains fourteen feathers.

The emblem of Syria features a tan-coloured eagle, facing to its right (dexter), with three five-pointed stars, adopted from the Syrian flag, arranged in an arc above its head. The eagle's tail contain five feathers, symbolizing main geographical regions – the north, south, east, west and center. The wings contain 14 feathers, symbolizing the country's 14 governorates. The emblem was officially adopted on 3 July 2025.

From the establishment of the Syrian Republic on 14 May 1930 until the adoption of the current design, Syria used different emblems but all of them consisted of a supporter (often the Hawk of Quraish) bearing a shield, with the country's official Arabic name displayed on a scroll beneath.

== History ==
=== Syrian Republic ===
In accordance with Decree No. 158 of 6/3/1364 AH (18/2/1945 AD), published in the Official Gazette, the emblem of the Syrian Republic consists of an Arab shield with three stars in the centre, which are the stars of the Syrian flag. The shield is embraced by an eagle derived from Arab history, as it was the banner of Quraysh in Jahiliyah and the banner of Khalid ibn al-Walid when he conquered Damascus. The shield is surrounded by three lines and at the bottom of the shield are two wheat stalks, symbolising the country's first crop and its agricultural character. The eagle holds in its claws a ribbon that reads "The Syrian Republic" in Kufic script, as the concept of Arab nationalism had not yet formalised.

The emblem was designed by artist Khaled Al-Asali, a Syrian diplomat and visual artist. He was born in 1915, practiced journalistic caricature, and died in 1990.

=== United Arab Republic ===
During Syria's union with Egypt in the United Arab Republic (UAR) from 1958 to 1961, the pan-Arab Eagle of Saladin was adopted as the basis for the national coat of arms. In accordance with Law No. 190 of 1958, the emblem of the republic was described as an ornamental eagle, modeled after the eagle associated with Salah al-Din al-Ayyubi (Saladin), standing on a base inscribed in Kufic script with the words "United Arab Republic". The eagle also featured a shield on its chest representing the national flag of the republic. Although Syria withdrew from the union in 1961, Egypt continued to use the official name, flag, and coat of arms of the UAR until 1971. Following its withdrawal, Syria reverted to the coat of arms used prior to the UAR, later modifying it in 1963 by inverting the colors of the mullets and the orle.

The emblem's association with Saladin stems from a bird depicted on the walls of the Citadel of Cairo. However, historical observations indicate that the bird is, in fact, could also be a falcon rather than an eagle. Though this observation is not confirmed, this distinction led to initial resistance from some conservative Syrians, who opposed adopting Egypt's emblem due to its depiction of an eagle as a spear-eater. Nevertheless, these objections were ultimately disregarded, and the symbol remained in use.

=== Reversion to the original symbol ===
On September 29, 1961, Syria formally ended its union with Egypt, marking the dissolution of the United Arab Republic (UAR). Following the separation, the newly re-established Syrian Arab Republic reinstated its national emblem, the Hawk of Quraish (al-‘Uqab), marking Syria’s return to its pre-1958 national symbols following its withdrawal from the UAR. This decision was officially codified in Legislative Decree No. 2, issued on September 30, 1961, and published in the Official Gazette (Issue No. 1, October 5, 1961). The decree stated:

- The national flag of the Syrian Arab Republic shall be the flag of the Syrian Republic.
- The national emblem of the Syrian Arab Republic shall be the emblem of the Syrian Republic.

=== Ba'athist change ===
According to Decree No. 394, issued on February 10, 1969, the emblem of the Syrian Arab Republic was modified from its previous version, which had been established under Decree No. 158 on February 18, 1945. The revised design featured an Arab shield with three green stars at its center, embraced by a Hawk (al-‘Uqab) with three surrounding lines. At the bottom of the shield, two wheat stalks were added. The hawk clutched a scroll in its talons, inscribed in Kufic script with the words "Syrian Arab Republic" (al-Jumhūriyyah al-‘Arabiyyah as-Sūriyyah).

The emblem’s color scheme included an iron-like (metallic) color for the hawk, with silver and gold lines decorating its wings. The shield featured three green stars on a silver background, encircled by three lines in the following order: red (outermost), white, and black (innermost). The wheat stalks were colored in a golden hue, resembling natural wheat. This redesign maintained the symbolic elements of Syria’s national identity while incorporating the Hawk of Quraish, which later became the emblem of the Federation of Arab Republics (1972–1977), alongside Egypt and Libya.

==== Colors under the Federation of Arab Republics ====
In 1972, the Hawk of Quraish (al-‘Uqab) was incorporated into the flag and emblem of the Federation of Arab Republics, a loose political union between Syria, Egypt, and Libya. Retired Brigadier General Dr. Adeeb Al-Shaa’r explained the significance of the emblem, stating that the hawk symbolizes pride, courage, and leadership among birds of prey. It resides in mountainous regions and was historically preferred over the eagle because it only hunts live prey and does not scavenge. While falcons have also been highly regarded in Arab culture, they were not chosen as a national emblem due to their perceived aggressiveness. Instead, the hawk was selected as a symbol of bravery without hostility. To distinguish the Hawk of Quraish from the eagle used in Egypt, Syria depicted the hawk with its wings spread open, whereas the eagle was illustrated with folded wings. Ornithologists have also noted differences, pointing out that eagles lack feathers on their necks, unlike hawks.

The confusion between the eagle (niser) and the hawk (‘uqab) in Syria's national emblem arose following the country's union with Egypt in the United Arab Republic (1958–1961), where the eagle was used as the official symbol. After Syria withdrew from the UAR in 1961, it reinstated the Hawk of Quraish as its national emblem, yet the term niser (eagle) remained commonly used by the public to refer to the national symbol.

==== Design finalization ====
After the end of the union, all three former member states retained the Hawk of Quraish. Egypt finally reverted to the Eagle of Saladin in 1984, which had served as the coat of arms of both Egypt and Libya prior to the abortive union, and which still serves as the basis of the in this arms of Egypt, Iraq, and Palestine. Syria continued to use the Hawk of Quraish, as did Libya under Gaddafi (although the Libyan version faced to the dexter rather than to the sinister, as in the Syrian version). The coat of arms was adopted by Law No. 37 on 21 June 1980, after it was approved by the People’s Assembly on 17 June 1980 and published in the Official Gazette, Issue No. 26 of 1980. This emblem consisted of the Hawk of Quraish supporting a shield bearing the national flag of Syria (in vertical form; called in blazon Tierced in pale gules, argent, and sable, two mullets palewise vert), and a scroll of the words "Syrian Arab Republic" (Arabic: الجمهورية العربية السورية).

=== Since 2011 and post-Ba'athist Syria ===
The emblem of the Syrian Armed Forces using the Syrian emblem, extended by an exterior laurel wreath and two asymmetrical crossed swords at the bottom

During the Syrian civil war which began in March 2011, various symbols and emblems were used by the Syrian opposition including the Syrian Salvation Government, the Syrian Interim Government, and by the Autonomous Administration of North and East Syria.

After the fall of the Assad regime in December 2024, the newly formed Syrian caretaker government updated the coat of arms into an emblem with a new escutcheon based on the flag Syria used upon independence from France in 1946; with the Hawk of Quraish faced dexter rather than sinister. However, this short-lived emblem was not official, and while it was visually depicted throughout the Constitutional Declaration of the Syrian Arab Republic, it was not verbally mentioned.

A new emblem was adopted on 3 July 2025, depicting a golden eagle, inspired by ancient motifs at Palmyra, surmounted by three stars, taken from the Syrian flag. The three stars generally signify the people's liberation. The eagle has a total of 14 wing feathers, symbolizing the country's 14 governorates, and five tail feathers that symbolize Syria's five principal geographic regions: the north, east, west, south, and center. The three stars, taken from the Syrian flag, symbolize the people and their liberation, while their position above the eagle signifies the primacy of the people over the state.

== Gallery ==
Arab Kingdom of Syria
(1919–1920)

First Syrian Republic, Second Syrian Republic
(1945–1958)

United Arab Republic
(1958–1961)

Syrian Arab Republic
(1961–1963)

Ba'athist Syria
(1963–1972)

Ba'athist Syria
(1972–1980)

Ba'athist Syria
(1980–2024)

Syria (2024–2025) (Note: De facto used by the Syrian caretaker government.)

Syria (2025–present)

== See also ==
- Flag of Syria
- National symbols of Syria
- Coat of arms of Germany
- Coat of arms of the United Arab Republic
- Coat of arms of the Federation of Arab Republics
- Hawk of Quraish
- Eagle of Saladin
