= Eagle of Saladin =

Heraldic animal

The Eagle of Saladin (Arabic: نسر صلاح الدين, romanized: Nasr Ṣalāḥ ad-Dīn) is a heraldic eagle that serves as the coat of arms in some Arab countries: Egypt, Iraq, Palestine, Syria, and Yemen. Since the 1952 Egyptian revolution, the eagle has been an iconic symbol of Egypt, and of Arab nationalism, particularly in Arab states that underwent anti-imperialist political change from the 1950s onwards. It was formerly the national symbol of the now defunct United Arab Republic, North Yemen, South Yemen, and the Libyan Arab Republic.

== Origin ==
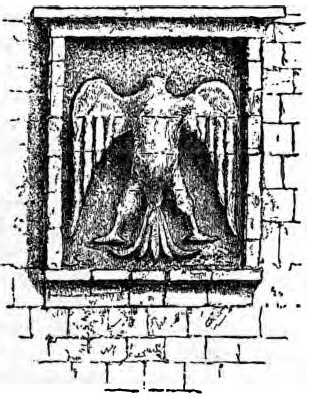
Sketch of the "Eagle of Saladin" at the Cairo Citadel in Egypt, as it appeared in the late 19th century, with its heads missing

Reconstruction of an Ayyubid double-headed eagle, based on a coin minted under al-Adil I

The Cairo Citadel, built during Saladin's reign, has a large stylized eagle carved in stone on its west wall. It is commonly believed to depict Saladin's emblem, although this is not confirmed by historical sources. The eagle appears headless today, but it was described by the 17th-century Ottoman explorer Evliya Çelebi as having been double-headed, painted in bright colors, and having two copper tongues. European explorers in the 18th century provide a similar description. The course lines of the stone carving do not correspond with those on the wall, suggesting that it was moved to its present location at a later period, possibly during the rule of Muhammad Ali, when the upper part of the wall was rebuilt. The double-headed eagle symbol was used on coins of al-Adil I (r. 1201–1218), Saladin's brother who succeeded him as Sultan.

== Modern history ==
The first state emblem to use the Eagle of Saladin was the Egyptian coat of arms adopted during the 1952 revolution

The coat of arms of the United Arab Republic instituted the modern design of the Republican Eagle

The Egyptian Revolution of 1952 was characterised by a profound reassertion of Egyptian nationalism, and later the regional Arab nationalism under Gamal Abdel Nasser's rule, the latter particularly in the context of the Arab–Israeli conflict. Drawing direct parallels between this conflict and the Crusades, the leaders of Egypt's revolution connected their own declared efforts of Arab liberation with those of the medieval Saladin who, as Egypt's sultan, had united Arab forces against the Crusaders in Palestine. Simultaneously, Egypt's revolutionary government under Muhammad Naguib and Gamal Abdel Nasser, both veterans of the Palestine War, introduced the Arab Liberation Flag bearing the colours of red, white, black, and green associated with the Rashidun Caliphate of Medina, the Umayyad Caliphate of Damascus, the Abbasid Caliphate of Baghdad, and Egypt's own Fatimid Caliphate of Cairo. In the centre of the flag, they placed the Eagle of Saladin, rendered in gold. Henceforth, both the Eagle of Saladin and the Arab Liberation Flag would become symbols linked inextricably with republican Egypt, and the wider cause of Arab nationalism. When Egypt united with Syria in 1958 to form the United Arab Republic, the Eagle of Saladin became the new state's coat of arms, whilst the Arab Liberation Flag was taken as the basis for the flag.

Even though the Egyptian-Syrian union ended abruptly in 1961 after a coup d'état in Syria, the Eagle remained a potent symbol for those aspiring for Arab unity. Following the toppling of the monarchy of North Yemen in 1962, the Eagle became the national symbol of the new Yemen Arab Republic, and later of the People's Democratic Republic of Yemen in South Yemen in 1967. Likewise, Iraq's 1963 Ramadan Revolution by the Arab Socialist Ba'ath Party led to Iraq also adopting the Eagle as Iraq's coat of arms of Iraq. Conversely, the Libyan Arab Republic adopted the Eagle in 1969, however, it was later supplanted by the Hawk of Quraish when, along with Egypt, and Syria, Libya established the Federation of Arab Republics in 1972.

The State of Palestine was the most recent state to adopt the Eagle of Saladin, doing so upon its declaration of statehood in 1988.

== Uses ==
=== In flags ===
Flag of Egypt

Presidential Standard of Egypt

Egyptian Revolution Flag (1953–1958)

Standard of the president of the United Arab Republic.

Egyptian Army

Egyptian Navy

Egyptian Air Force

Egyptian Air Defense Forces

Standard of the president of the United Arab Republic at sea.

Egyptian National Police

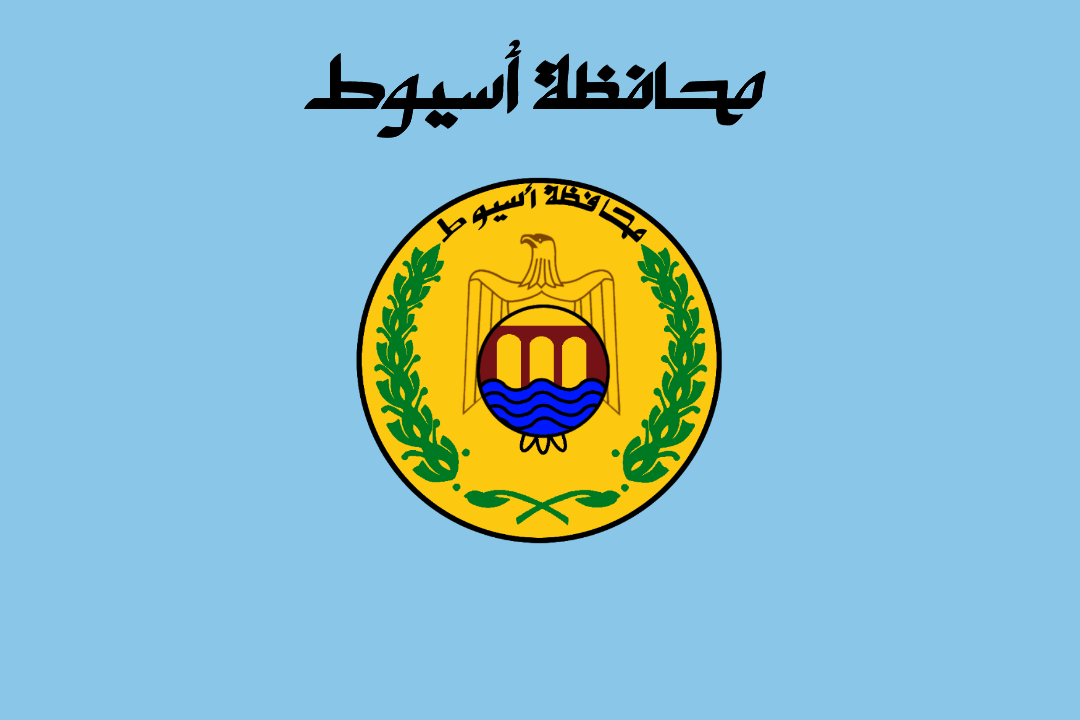
Asyut Governorate

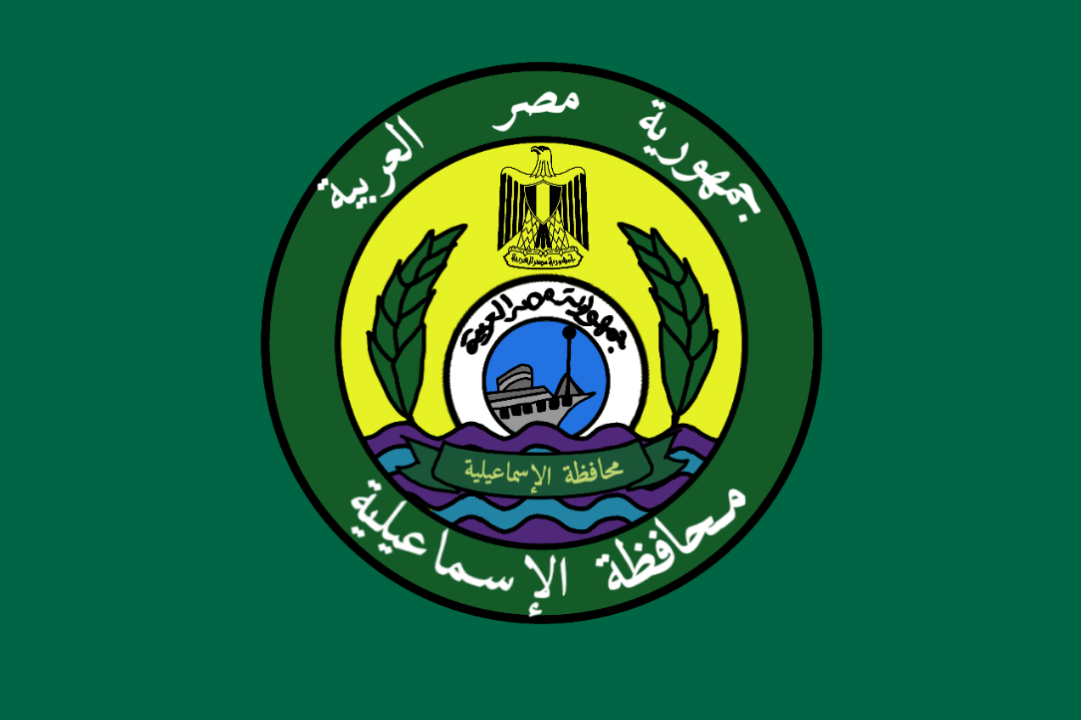
Ismailia Governorate

Standard of the President of Palestine

Presidential standard of South Yemen 1967-1990

Presidential Flag of Yemen

Yemeni Air Force

Yemeni Army

Yemeni Navy

Yemeni Interior Ministry

Iraqi Counter Terrorism Service

Iraqi Police

== Current national emblems using the Eagle of Saladin ==
Coat of arms of Egypt

Coat of arms of Iraq

Coat of arms of Palestine

Emblem of Yemen

National emblem of Somaliland

== Regional emblems and unrecognised entities using the Eagle of Saladin ==
Coat of arms of the Kurdistan Region

== Former national emblems using the Eagle of Saladin ==
Coat of arms of Egypt (1953–1958)

Coat of arms of the United Arab Republic (1958–1971)

Coat of arms of the Libyan Arab Republic (1969–1972)

Coat of arms of South Yemen (1967-1970)

Coat of arms of North Yemen (1962-1966)

Coat of arms of North Yemen (1966-1974)

Coat of arms of North Yemen (1974–1990)

Coat of arms of Iraq (1965–1991)

Coat of arms of Iraq (1991–2004)

== See also ==
- Coat of arms of Egypt
- Coat of arms of Iraq
- Coat of arms of Palestine
- Coat of arms of the United Arab Republic
- Coat of arms of Yemen
- Coat of arms of Libya
- Hawk of Quraish
- Double-headed eagle
