= Hawk of Quraish =

Heraldic bird used in the Arab world

Blank coat of arms "supported" by the Hawk of Quraish: It is one of the Arab national symbols that have been used in many Arab nation-states.

The Hawk of Quraish (Arabic: صقرُ قُريْشٍ, romanized: ṣāqr Quraysh) is a symbol which is found on a number of emblems, coats of arms and flags of several states of the Arab world. The traditions and recorded history about the Quraysh and Prophet Muhammad claim a falcon had been used as clan symbol. Therefore, several variants of the Quraishi hawk were and are seen in the flags, coat of arms, seals and emblems of several Arab states until today. In that meaning, the Hawk of Quraish is a rival to the Eagle of Saladin.

Abd ar-Rahman I, the first Umayyad Emir of Córdoba, was known as the Hawk of Quraish (Saqr Quraish). According to medieval chroniclers, this was an Arabic name given to him by the Abbasid Caliph al-Mansur, one of his greatest rivals. The Abbasids and Umayyads were both tribes of the Quraysh clan, and Abd ar-Rahman had fled Damascus after the bloody and violent Abbasid Revolution, so for the Abbasid Caliph to give this appellation to the last surviving Umayyad heir was a sign of great respect.

Hawk and falcon symbols are also common in the Gulf Arab countries. Many of the Arabs of the Arabian Peninsula, today especially those from the Arab side of the Persian Gulf coast, are traditionally falconry experts; falcons (and hawks) are seen as status symbols and are a common domesticated animal among ethnic Arabs.

== Current emblems using the Hawk of Quraish ==
Quraishi hawk in Libyan coat of arms as used by Marshal Khalifa Haftar, military commander in the government in Tobruk

Quraishi hawk in emblem of Palestine Liberation Army

== Current emblems using other hawk or falcon symbols ==
Hawk in the Coat of arms of Jordan

Falcon in the Emblem of Kuwait

Falcon in the Emblem of the United Arab Emirates

Falcon in the emblem of Emirate of Abu Dhabi (UAE)

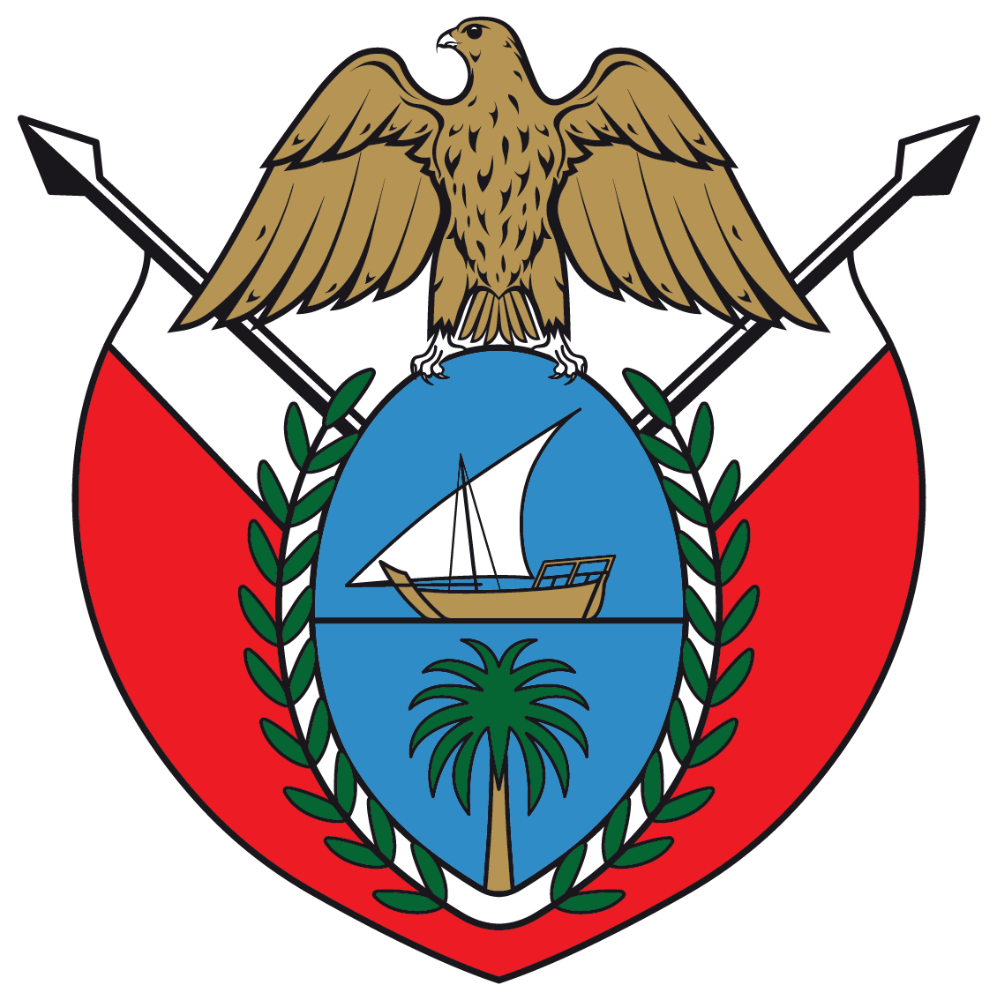
Falcon in the emblem of Emirate of Dubai (UAE)

== Former emblems using the Hawk of Quraish ==
Quraishi hawk in the former coat of arms of Libya (1977–2011)

Quraishi hawk in the arms of the former Federation of Arab Republics (including Egypt, Syria, and Libya) (1972–1980)

Quraishi hawk in coat of arms of the Syrian Republic (1945–58)

Quraishi hawk in the coat of arms of the Syrian Arab Republic (1961–1963)

Quraishi hawk in the coat of arms of Ba'athist Syria (1963–1972)

Quraishi hawk in the coat of arms of Ba'athist Syria (1980–2024)

Seal of the president of Syria (1980–2024)

Seal of the prime minister of Syria (1980–2024)

Seal of the People's Assembly of Syria (1980–2024)

Quraishi hawk in the emblem of Syria (2024–2025)

Quraishi hawk used in the seal of the President of the Council of Ministers of Syria and the Council of Ministers of Syria

Quraishi hawk used in the seal of the Ministry of Education (Syria)

Quraishi hawk used in the alternative seal of the Syrian Ministry of Education

== See also ==
- Eagle of Saladin
- Emblem of Kyrgyzstan
