= Coat of arms of Iraq =

- Armiger: Republic of Iraq
- Adopted: 1965; 61 years ago (original version); 2008; 18 years ago (current version)
- Shield: Tierced per fess Gules, Argent and Sable, on the fess point the words 'Allahu Akbar' in Arabic Kufic script Vert.
- Supporters: The Eagle of Saladin, wings inverted Or.
- Motto: The words 'Jumhuriyat Al-`Iraq' in Arabic script (Arabic: 'Republic of Iraq'

The Coat of arms of Iraq, since the rule of Baathism, features a golden black eagle looking towards the viewer's left dexter. The eagle is the Eagle of Saladin associated with 20th-century pan-Arabism, bearing a shield of the Iraqi flag, and holding a scroll below with the Arabic words جمهورية العراق (Jumhūriyyat al-ʿIrāq – "Republic of Iraq").

The coat of arms has been modified three times: in 1991, in 2004, and in 2008.

== Emblems of Iraq ==
=== 1921–1958 ===
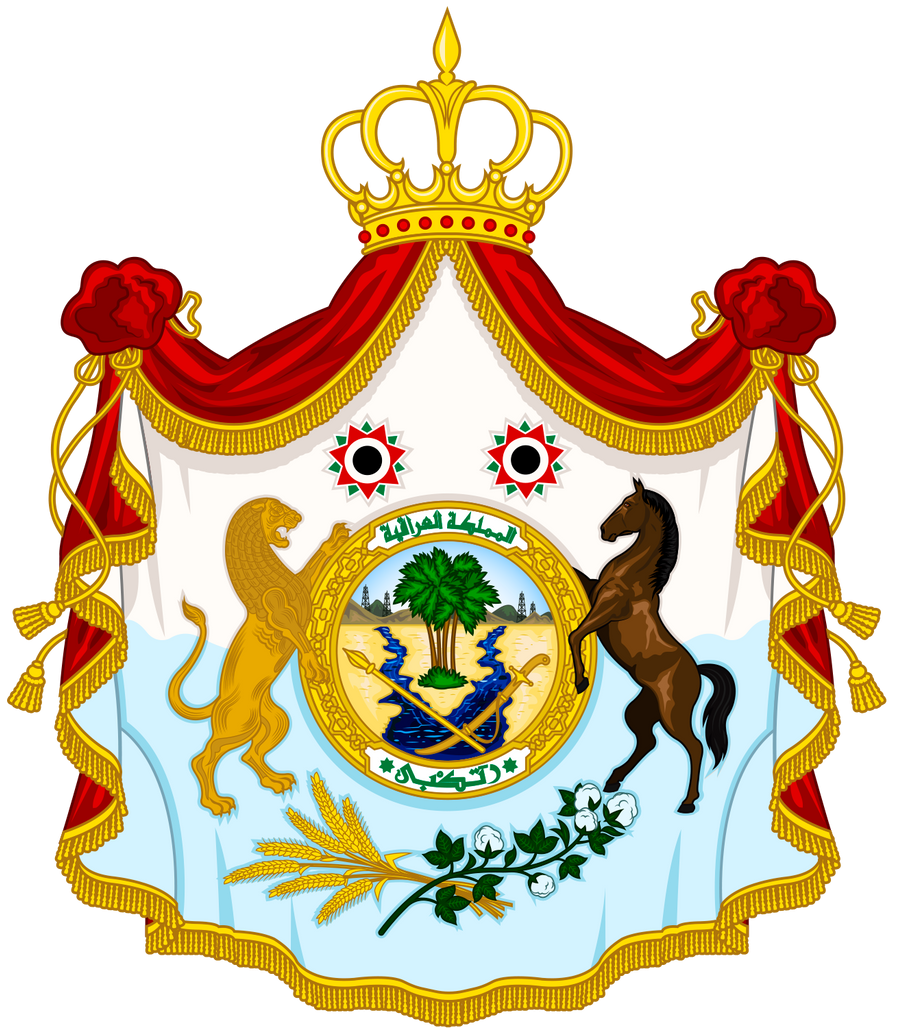
Coat of arms of the Hashemite Kingdom of Iraq (until 1958)

After the Mandate for Mesopotamia and the establishment of the Kingdom of Iraq, the coat of arms of the Hashemite Kingdom of Iraq represented the Kingdom's ancient history during pre-Islamic times, as well as during post-Islamic times.

Symbolizing the monarchy of the Hashemite Kingdom of Iraq, the golden crown is composed of five arches with beaded design, fanning out from beneath its pinnacle and attached to the base with a relief design recalling rubies and emeralds. The crown is adorned at the top by the tip of a spear that represents the Hashemite banner.

The crown rests on a royal mantle, which signifies sacrifice and purity. The mantle is trimmed in a fringe of golden threads and gathered on either side with golden tasselled cords to reveal a white silk lining.

Two stars are above the central shield on either side. Each star represents Ishtar and Shamash.

The shield's dexter supporter is the Lion of Babylon, the sinister supporter is an Arabian horse, both traditional symbols of the power of the king.

The shield in the centre shows a depiction of the land of Mesopotamia. They depict the two rivers, Euphrates and Tigris, flowing through the desert, and their confluence at the Shatt al-Arab. At the confluence is a tree at the rivers banks, which symbolises the largest date palm forest in the world that used to be there. Underneath the tree over the rivers are a scimitar and a spear, to depict the defense of the land. Around the shield at the top are in Kufic script "Justice is the basis of ruling" and underneath the year of independence 1339 in Hijri year.

Underneath the shield are gold ears of wheat and a palm frond.

=== 1959–1965 ===
The first post-monarchical state emblem of Iraq, adopted under the republican government of Abd al-Karim Qasim, was based on the ancient sun-disk symbol of Shamash and Ishtar, and avoided pan-Arab symbolism by incorporating elements of socialist heraldry.

At the time of the Iraqi Revolution of 1958, Qassim had demonstrated strong pan-Arab and Arab nationalist views; however, these cooled somewhat during his premiership.

Law No.57 of 1959 titled "Emblem of the Iraq Republic" and Article 1, "Description of the Emblem" state:

The Emblem of the Iraqi Republic shall consist of a circle from which eight beams diffuse. Each beam consists of three stretchings, the colour of golden yellow. Between every two beams a deep red projection of a star emerges. Amidst th[a]t circle a blue area exists. In the centre of which there is a golden spike surrounded by a black wheel with eight rectangular projections at the inner side, encircled by a white ring that extends till the black circumference. In the middle of this white ring there is an Arabic sword that embraces the wheel at the left hand-side, and a Kurdish dagger that embraces it at the right hand-side. Between their two tops the phrase ‘THE REPUBLIC OF IRAQ’ shall be written in Kufi writing, and between their hilts there is written the phrase ‘JULY 14’ and ‘1958’ underneath, in Kufi writing, too. The colour of the sword, the dagger and the Kufi writing is black.

Emblem of Iraq from 1959 to 1965, based on the ancient symbol of Shamash and the star of Ishtar and avoided pan-Arab symbolism.

Flag of Iraq from 1959 to 1963 with the star of Ishtar in the middle.

=== 1965–present ===
The overthrow of Qasim's government by the Ba'ath Party in 1963 marked an increase in pan-Arab sympathies, a change which was demonstrated in the new national flag based on that of the United Arab Republic (UAR). The new Iraqi coat of arms was similarly based on that of the UAR, namely the Eagle of Saladin, which had become a symbol of Arab nationalism following the Egyptian Revolution of 1952. Indeed, the only difference between the two coat of arms was the presence of three green stars in the vertical white band on the eagle's shield, as opposed to the two stars of the UAR, and the specific Arabic script in the scroll under the eagle's feet bearing the name of the official name state.

This version of the coat of arms remained in use until it was modified in January 1991, concurrently with the addition of the Takbir between the green stars on the flag of Iraq. To permit the Takbir to appear on the same line on the shield on the coat of arms, it was decided to make the bands on the shield horizontal instead of vertical. Of the six Arab states that are, or have previously used the Eagle of Saladin in their coat of arms, post 1991, Iraq is the only state whose coat of arms has its national flag appearing horizontally rather than vertically on the shield. In 2004, following the U.S. invasion and occupation of Iraq, the U.S. appointed Iraqi interim administration that modified the Takbir on both the flag and the coat of arms, rendering it in Kufic script. The original 1963 coat of arms without the Takbir remained valid until 2008.

In 2008, concurrent with the removal of the three green stars from the Iraqi flag, the stars were removed from the coat of arms, leaving only the Takbir in the central white band.

Coat of arms of Iraq from 1965 to 1991. This version had appeared without the Takbir until 1991.

Variant of the coat of arms of Iraq from 1991 to 2004.

Variant of the coat of arms of Iraq from 2004 to 2008.

Coat of arms of Iraq from 2008 to present.

== See also ==
- Iraqi nationalism
- Flag of Iraq
- Ashur
- Shamash
- Lamassu
- Lion of Babylon
- Star of Ishtar
- Eagle of Saladin

== Sources ==
- Black, Jeremy; Green, Anthony (1992). Gods, Demons, and Symbols of Ancient Mesopotamia: An Illustrated Dictionary. University of Texas Press. ISBN 0-292-70794-0.
- Düring, Bleda S. (2020). The Imperialisation of Assyria: An Archaeological Approach. Cambridge: Cambridge University Press. ISBN 978-1108478748.
- Frahm, Eckart (2017). "The Neo-Assyrian Period (ca. 1000–609 BCE)". In E. Frahm (ed.). A Companion to Assyria. Hoboken: John Wiley & Sons. pp. 161–208. ISBN 978-1118325247.
- Liverani, Mario (2017). "Thoughts on the Assyrian Empire and Assyrian Kingship". In E. Frahm (ed.). A Companion to Assyria. Hoboken: John Wiley & Sons. pp. 534–546. ISBN 978-1118325247.
