= Federation of Arab Republics =

Confederation of Libya, Egypt and Syria (1972–1977)

Federation of Arab Republics إتحاد الجمهوريات العربية (Arabic) Ittiḥād al-Jumhūrīyāt al-'Arabīyah
- 1972–1977
- Flag Coat of arms
- Anthem: "Walla Zaman Ya Selahy" (English: "Oh For Ages! My Weapon!") (by Egypt and Libya) Humat ad-Diyar (English: "Guardians of the Homeland") (by Syria)
- The Federation of Arab Republics in 1972.
- Capital: Cairo (Egypt); Tripoli (Libya); Damascus (Syria)
- Largest city: Cairo
- Official languages: Arabic
- Government: Federal republic under a confederation
- Legislature: Federal National Assembly
- Historical era: Arab Cold War
  - Referendums held: 1 September 1971
  - Federation established: 1 January 1972
  - Disestablished: 19 November 1977

Area
  - Total: 2,895,128 km^{2} (1,117,815 sq mi)
- Currency: Egyptian pound; Libyan dinar; Syrian pound
Preceded by
Arab Republic of Egypt
Libyan Arab Republic
Syrian Arab Republic
Succeeded by
Arab Republic of Egypt
Libyan Arab Jamahiriya
Syrian Arab Republic
- Today part of: Egypt; Libya; Syria

The Federation of Arab Republics (FAR; Arabic: إتحاد الجمهوريات العربية, romanized: Ittiḥād al-Jumhūrīyāt al-'Arabīyah, lit. 'Union of Arab Republics') was an unsuccessful attempt by Muammar Gaddafi to merge Libya, Egypt and Syria in order to create a unified Arab state. Although approved by a referendum in each country on 1 September 1971, the three countries disagreed on the specific terms of the merger. The federation lasted from 1 January 1972 to 19 November 1977.

== History ==
In 1969, Arab nationalist military officers seized power in Libya. The ideological influence of Egyptian President Gamal Abdel Nasser over the new Libyan government was immediately apparent. The administration was immediately recognized by the Arab nationalist governments in Egypt, Iraq, Sudan and Syria with Egypt sending experts to aid Libya's inexperienced government. Gaddafi propounded Pan-Arab ideas, proclaiming the need for a single Arab state stretching across North Africa and the Middle East. In December 1969, Libya founded the Arab Revolutionary Front with Egypt and Sudan as a step towards political unification, and in 1970 Syria stated its intention to join.

After Nasser's death in September 1970, his successor, Anwar Sadat, suggested that rather than a unified state, they create a political federation. It was implemented in April 1971 which enabled Egypt, Syria and Sudan to get large grants of Libyan oil money. In September 1972, Gaddafi and Sadat signed an unofficial charter of merger, but it was never implemented as relations broke down the following year. Sadat became increasingly wary of Libya's radical direction, and the September 1973 deadline for implementing the Federation passed by with no action taken. In October 1973 Egypt and Syria, without consulting Libya, launched a coordinated attack on Israel, initiating the October war. Sadat agreed to open negotiations with Israel, seeking the return of the Sinai Peninsula to Egypt in exchange for a guarantee to not engage in further attacks on the country. Gaddafi was angered by the war's limited objectives and the ceasefire, and accused Sadat of cowardice, undermining the FAR, and betraying the Arab cause. Sadat responded by revealing he had intervened earlier that year to prevent Libya from sinking a civilian passenger ship carrying Jewish tourists in the Mediterranean Sea. Thereafter Egyptian–Libyan relations were marked by frequent accusations against each country's leaders, and further discussions regarding the pursuit of unity were abandoned.

=== Referendums ===
Three simultaneous referendums on the Federation of Arab Republics were held on 1 September 1971, in Egypt, Libya and Syria. In the Egyptian referendum the proposal was approved by 99.96% of voters, in the Libyan referendum it was approved by 98.6% of voters, whilst in Syria 96.4% voted in favour.

=== Other Federations of Arab Republics ===
- Federation of Egypt, Libya and Sudan (1969/70–1971)
- Federation of Egypt, Libya and Syria (1971/72–1974/77)
- Union between Egypt and Libya within the Federation (1972–1973/74)
- Union between Egypt and Syria within the Federation (1976–1977)
- Federation comprising Egypt, Sudan and Syria (1977)
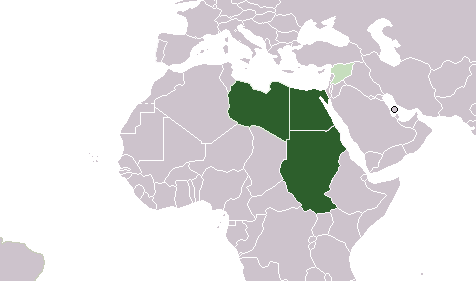
FAR 1970, Syria intends to join the Egyptian-Libyan-Sudanese Federation

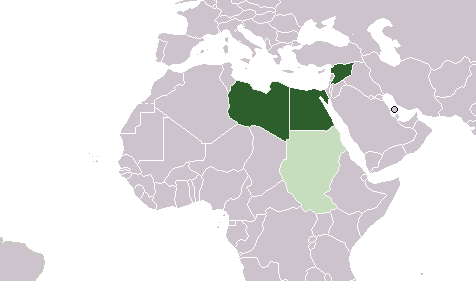
FAR 1971, Sudan is said to join later but keeps outside the Federation

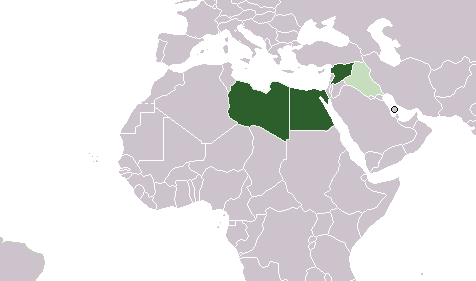
FAR 1972, Iraq is invited to join the Egyptian-Libyan-Syrian Federation
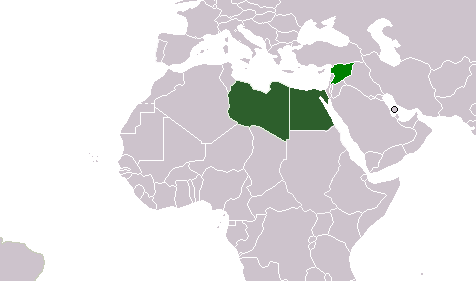
FAR 1973, Egypt and Libya fail to form a Union within the Federation

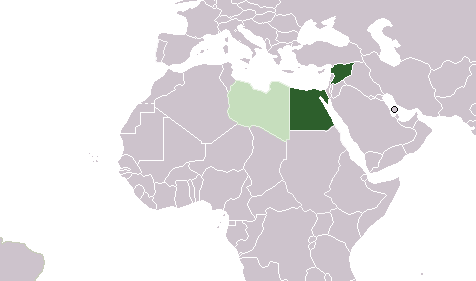
FAR 1976, Egypt and Syria intend to form a Union within the Federation

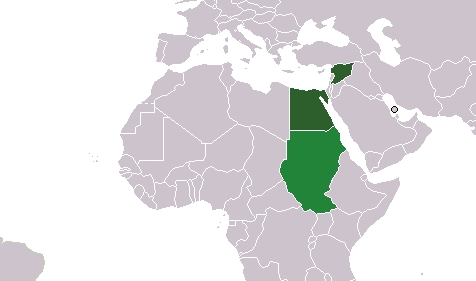
FAR 1977, Sudan intends to join the Egypt-Syrian Federation

== Symbols of member states ==
=== Flags ===
Egyptian flag used until 1984, 7 years after the dissolution

Libyan flag used until 1977

Syrian flag used until 1980, 3 years after the dissolution

=== Coats of arms ===
Egyptian coat of arms used until 1984, 7 years after the dissolution

Libyan coat of arms used until 1977

Syrian coat of arms used until 1980, 3 years after the dissolution

=== Maps ===
Location of Egypt

Location of Libya

Location of Syria

== See also ==
- Union of Arab Republics, Iraqi counter-proposal to the Federation of Arab Republics
- Arab Federation, a confederation between Iraq and Jordan (1958)
- Arab Islamic Republic, a proposed union of Libya and Tunisia (1974)
- United Arab Emirates, a union of seven Arab states (1971–present day)
- United Arab Republic, a union between Egypt and Syria (1958–61)
- United Arab States, a confederation between the United Arab Republic and the Kingdom of Yemen (1958–61)
- Unified Political Command, merger projects between Egypt and Iraq as well as between Egypt and North Yemen
