= List of Arab flags =

Flag map of the Arab World.

Flags of Arab countries, territories, and organisations usually include the color green, which is a symbol of Islam as well as an emblem of purity, fertility and peace. Common colors in Arab flags are Pan-Arab colors (red, black, white and green); common symbols include stars, crescents and the Shahada.

== Lists of national flags ==
=== United Nations member states and observers ===
Flag	Duration	Use	Description
	1962–present	Flag of Algeria	Two vertical bands of green and white and the red crescent moon encircling the red five-pointed star in the center within the dividing line.
	2002–present	Flag of Bahrain	A red field with the white serrated band with five points on the hoist-side.
	2002–present	Flag of Comoros	Four horizontal bands of yellow, white, red and blue and the green isosceles triangle is based on the hoist-side bearing the white vertical crescent moon with the convex side is facing the hoist and in the center and four small white five-pointed stars are placed vertically in the line in between the points of the crescent.
	1984–present	Flag of Egypt	Three horizontal bands of red, white and black and the National Coat of Arms in gold in the center of the white band.
	2008–present	Flag of Iraq	Three horizontal bands of red, white and black and the Takbir is written in the Kufic Script in green in the center of the white band. The written of the Takbir is: "ALLAHU AKBAR" (In Arabic for, "ALLAH IS THE GREATEST").
	1928–present	Flag of Jordan	Three horizontal bands of black, white and green and the red isosceles triangle is based on the hoist-side bearing the small white seven-pointed star in the center
	1961–present	Flag of Kuwait	Three horizontal bands of green, white and red and the black trapezoid is based on the hoist-side.
	1943–present	Flag of Lebanon	Three horizontal bands of red, white (double-width) and red and the green Cedar Tree in the center of the white band.
	1951–1969, 2011–present	Flag of Libya	Three horizontal stripes of red, black (double-width) and green and the white crescent and the five-pointed star in the center of the black stripe.
	2017–present	Flag of Mauritania	A green field with the golden five-pointed star and the golden horizontal crescent moon, the closed side is down, in the center in between two red horizontal bands on the top and the bottom edges of the flag.
	1915–present	Flag of Morocco	A red field with a green five-pointed linear star in the center.
	1970–present	Flag of Oman	Three horizontal bands of white, red and green and the red vertical band is on the hoist-side bearing the National emblem of Oman in white in the center and near the top of the red band.
	1964–present	Flag of Palestine	A horizontal tricolour of black, white, and green; with a red triangle based at the hoist.
	1971–present	Flag of Qatar	A maroon field with the white serrated band with nine points on the hoist side.
	1973–present	Flag of Saudi Arabia	A green field with the Shahada in the Thuluth Script in white and white horizontal saber, with the tip pointing to the hoist-side, in the center. The flag is manufactured with differing obverse and the reverse sides, so that the Shahada reads and the saber points correctly from right to left on both sides. The Shahada is written as "lā ʾilāha ʾillā-llāh, muhammadun rasūlu-llāh", Arabic for "There is no god but Allah; Muhammad is the Messenger of God."
	1970–present	Flag of Sudan	Three horizontal bands of red, white and black and the green isosceles triangle is based on the hoist-side.
	2025–present	Flag of Syria	Three horizontal bands of green, white and black and three red five-pointed stars that arranged in the horizontal line in the center of the white band.
	1827–present	Flag of Tunisia	A red field with the large white disk in the center bearing the red crescent moon nearly encircling the red five-pointed star.
	1971–present	Flag of the United Arab Emirates	Three horizontal bands of green, white and black and the red vertical band is on the hoist-side.
	1990–present	Flag of Yemen	Three horizontal bands of red, white and black.

=== Partially recognised States ===
Flag	Duration	Use	Description
	1976–present	Flag of the Sahrawi Arab Democratic Republic	A horizontal tricolour of black, white, and green; with a red triangle based at the hoist and a Red crescent and star on the white band.

== Old Arab national flags ==
Flag	Duration	Use	Description
	1917–1920	Flag of the Arab Revolt	
	1958	Flag of the Arab Federation	
	1958–1971, 1980–2024	Flag of the United Arab Republic, the Flag of the Arab Republic of Egypt, and the Flag of the Syrian Arab Republic	
	1972–1984	Flag of the Arab Republic of Egypt	
	1972–2002	Flag of the State of Bahrain	
	1924–1958	Flag of the Hashemite Kingdom of Iraq	
	1963–2008	Flag of the Iraqi Republic	
	1991–2004	Flag of the Iraqi Republic	Variant of the 1963 flag featuring a takbir written in a handwriting of Saddam Hussein
	2004–2008	Flag of Iraq	Variant of the 1963 flag featuring a takbir written in Kufic script
	1977–2011	Flag of the Great Socialist People's Libyan Arab Jamahiriya	
	1932–1934	Flag of the Kingdom of Saudi Arabia	
	1934–1938	Flag of the Kingdom of Saudi Arabia	
	1938–1973	Flag of the Kingdom of Saudi Arabia	
	1948 to 1959	Flag of the All-Palestine Protectorate	The All-Palestine Government (Arabic: حكومة عموم فلسطين Ḥukūmat ‘Umūm Filasṭīn) was established on 22 September 1948, during the 1948 Arab–Israeli War, to govern the Egyptian-controlled territory in Gaza, which Egypt had on the same day declared as the All-Palestine Protectorate, Three horizontal bands of green, white and black and the red equilateral triangle is based on the hoist side.
	1956–1970	Flag of the Republic of Sudan	A horizontal tricolour of blue (representing the Nile), yellow (representing the Sahara), and green (representing farmlands).
	1920	Flag of the Arab Kingdom of Syria	
	1932–1958, 1961–1963	Flag of the Mandatory Syrian Republic and Syrian Republic (1946–1963)	
	1963–1972	Flag of the Syrian Arab Republic	
	1972–1980	Flag of the Syrian Arab Republic	
	1968–1971	Flag of the Trucial States	
	1918–1923	Flag of the Mutawakkilite Kingdom of Yemen	
	1923–1927	Flag of the Mutawakkilite Kingdom of Yemen	
	1927–1962	Flag of the Mutawakkilite Kingdom of Yemen	
	1962–1990	Flag of the Yemen Arab Republic	
	1379–1967	Flag of the Kathiri Sultanate of Hadhramaut	
	1967–1990	Flag of the People's Democratic Republic of Yemen	
	1856–1896	Flag of the Sultanate of Zanzibar	
	1963–1964	Flag of the Sultanate of Zanzibar	

== Arab organizations ==
Flag	Duration	Use	Description
		Flag of the Arab League	
		Flag of the Cooperation Council for the Arab States of the Gulf	
	1947–2025	Flag of the Ba'ath Party	Three equal horizontal stripes (black, white, and green from top to bottom) overlaid by a red triangle issuing from the hoist. These are the Pan-Arab colors.

== Other Arab territories ==
Flag	Duration	Use	Description
	1964–present	Flag of the Palestine Liberation Organization and the Palestinian National Authority	Similar to the flag of the State of Palestine

== See also ==
- Flag of the Arab Revolt
- Pan-Arab colors
- Eagle of Saladin
- Organisation of Islamic Cooperation
- Flags with star and crescent
