= Islamic flags =

An Islamic flag is the flag representing an Islamic caliphate, religious order, state, civil society, military force or other entity associated with Islam. Islamic flags have a distinct history due to the Islamic prescription on aniconism, making particular colours, inscriptions or symbols such as crescent-and-star popular choices. Since the time of the Islamic prophet Muhammad, flags with certain colours were associated with Islam according to the traditions. Since then, historical caliphates, modern nation states, certain denominations as well as religious movements have adopted flags to symbolize their Islamic identity. Some secular states and ethnic or national movements also use symbols of Islamic origin as markers of heritage and identity.

== History ==
=== Early Islam ===
Before the advent of Islam, banners as tools for signaling had already been employed by the pre-Islamic Arab tribes and the Byzantines. Early Muslim armies naturally deployed banners for the same purpose. Early Islamic flags, however, greatly simplified its design by using plain color, due to the Islamic prescriptions on aniconism. According to the Islamic traditions, the Quraysh had a black banner and a white-and-black banner. It further states that Muhammad had a banner in white nicknamed "the Young Eagle" (Arabic: العقاب, al-ʿuqāb); and a flag in black, said to be made from his wife Aisha's head-cloth. This larger flag was known as the "Banner of the Eagle" (Arabic: الراية العقاب, romanized: al-rāyat al-ʿuqāb), as well as the "Black Banner" (Arabic: الراية السوداء, romanized: al-rāyat as-sawdāʾ). In the Islamic tradition, Muhammad used the white flag to represent both the leader of the Muslim army and the Muslim state. Other examples are the prominent Arab military commander 'Amr ibn al-'As using a red banner, and the Khawarij rebels using a red banner as well. Banners of the early Muslim armies in general, however, employed a variety of colors, both singly and in combination.

The Umayyad Caliphate, which ruled the largest geographical extent of the medieval Islamic Empire, adopted white flags. During the Abbasid Revolution, the Abbasids incorporated the Black Standard based on the early Islamic eschatological saying that "a people coming from the East with black banners" would herald the arrival of the messianic figure Mahdi. The Shiite Alids chose the color of white to distinguish themselves from the Abbasids, but also adopted green flags. Thus in 817, when the Abbasid caliph al-Ma'mun adopted the Alid Ali al-Ridha as his heir apparent, he also changed the dynastic color from black to green. The change was reverted when al-Ma'mun had Ali killed, and returned to Baghdad in 819. The Abbasids continued to use black as their dynastic color. However, their caliphal banner was made of white silk with the Quranic inscriptions. The white color was then adopted, in deliberate opposition to the Abbasids, by the Ismaili Shiite Fatimid Caliphate, and cemented the association of black and white with Sunni and Shia respectively. It was also used by the Almohads. The Fatimid caliphal banner was decorated in red and yellow, sometimes emblazoned with the picture of a lion. Early Muslim rulers are generally not known to have used emblems of a distinctly dynastic, religious, or personal nature.

Abbasid Caliphate used Black standards and are also attributed to Muhammad.

The Umayyad Caliphate, Fatimid Caliphate and Almohad Caliphate used white standards. White flags are also attributed to Muhammad.

Green flags were sometimes used by Shi'ites.

The Kharjites used red standards

=== Middle Ages ===
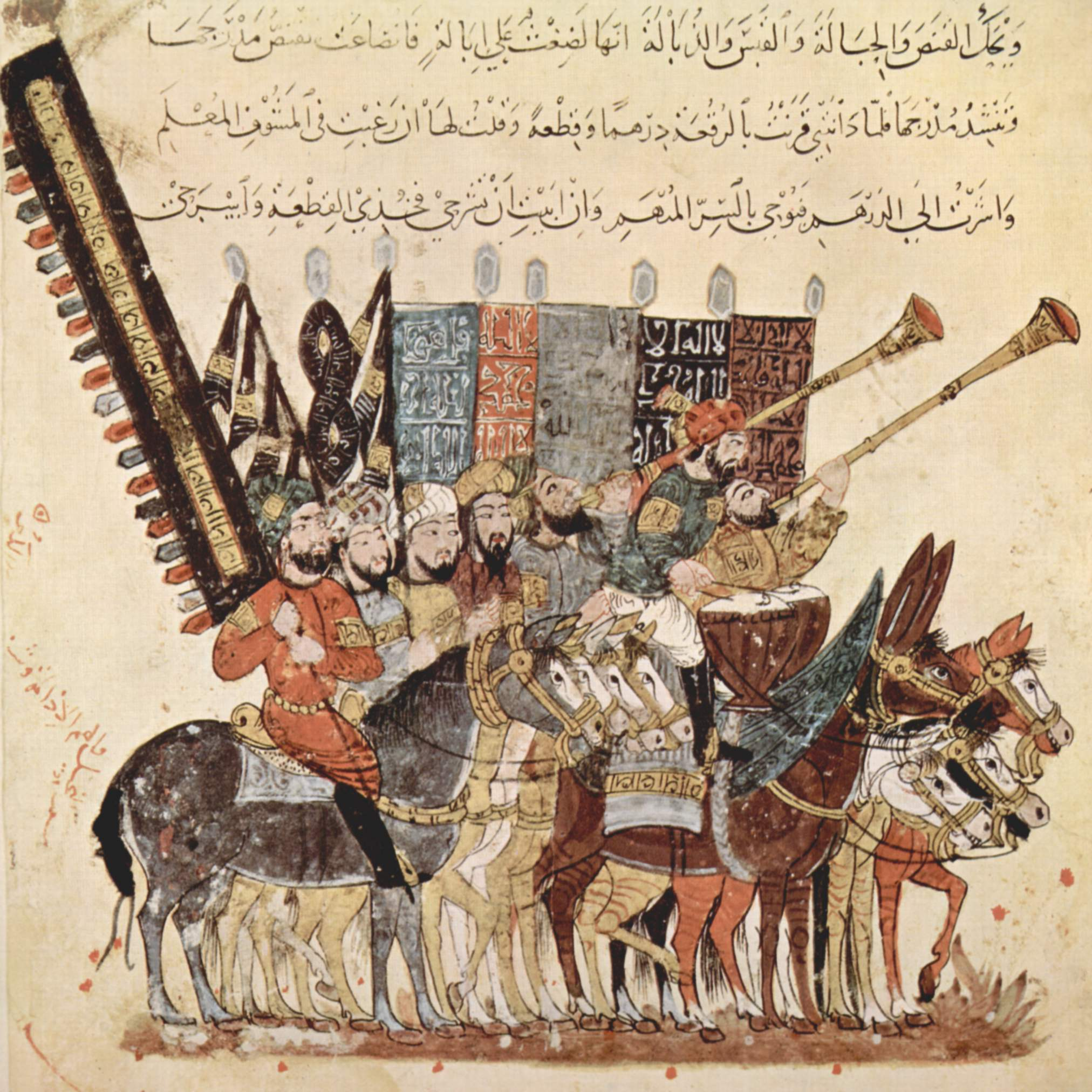
A troop of spectators on horseback and with inscribed banners watching a procession. Illustration from the seventh Maqama of al-Hariri of Basra in a 13th-century manuscript created by al-Wasiti (BNF ms. arabe 5847).

The Ayyubids and Mamluks, succeeding the Fatimid caliphate, retained the association with yellow. The Ayyubid founder Saladin carried a yellow flag adorned with an eagle. Mamluk sultanic banners were yellow, but on occasion they used red banners. Mongol and Turkic dynasties to the east, including the Ilkhanate, Oghuz Turks and the Seljuq dynasty, preferred the white banner. Religious flags with inscriptions were in use in the medieval period, as shown in miniatures by 13th-century illustrator Yahya ibn Mahmud al-Wasiti. 14th-century illustrations of the History of the Tatars by Hayton of Corycus (1243) shows both Mongols and Seljuqs using a variety of war ensigns.

The crescent appears in flags attributed to Tunis from as early as the 14th century Book of Knowledge of All Kingdoms, long before Tunis fell under Ottoman rule in 1574. The Spanish Navy Museum in Madrid shows two Ottoman naval flags dated 1613; both are swallow-tailed, one green with a white crescent near the hoist, the other white with two red stripes near the edges of the flag and a red crescent near the hoist.

The hexagram was also a popular symbol among the Islamic flags. It is known in Arabic as Khātem Sulaymān (Seal of Solomon; خاتم سليمان) or Najmat Dāūd (Star of David; نجمة داوود). The "Seal of Solomon" may also be represented by a five-pointed star or pentagram. In the Qur'an, it is written that David and King Solomon (Arabic, Suliman or Sulayman) were prophets and kings, and are figures revered by Muslims. The Medieval pre-Ottoman Hanafi Anatolian beyliks of the Karamanids and Jandarids used the star on their flag.

The Mamluks served the Custodian of the Two Holy Mosques during their reign. During this time, they deployed what was believed to be the genuine relic of the Islamic prophet Muhammad's banner. The banner was later captured by the Ottomans, who called the flag the "noble banner" (Sancak-ı Şerif) and used it during their military campaign. The flag was made of black wool, according to the Ottoman historian Silahdar Findiklili Mehmed Agha, but there is no further information available.

The Ayyubid yellow standard

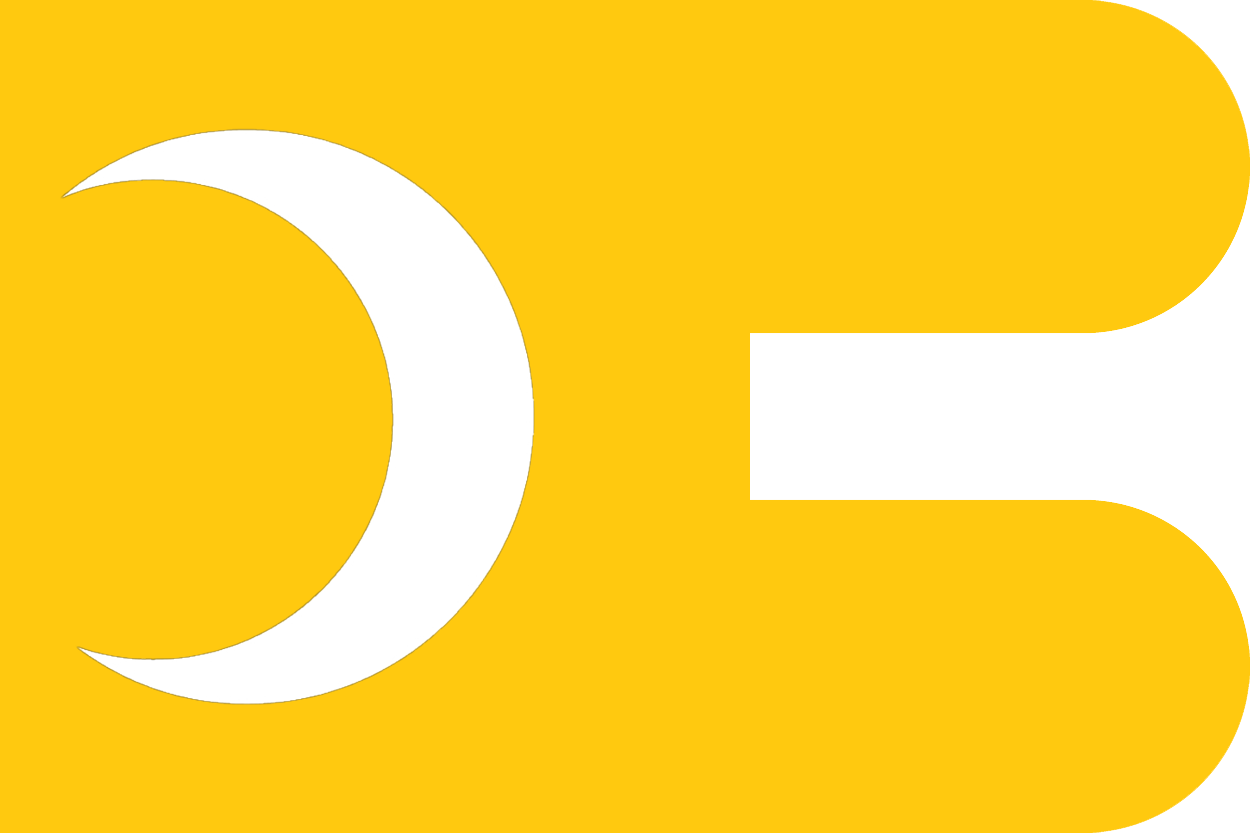
A flag of the Mamluk Sultanate according to the Catalan Atlas

=== Pre-modern era ===
Ottoman Empire

War flags came into use by the Ottoman Empire in the 16th century, gradually replacing (but long coexisting with) their traditional tugh or horse-tail standards. During the 16th and 17th centuries, war flags often depicted the bifurcated sword of Ali, Zulfiqar, which was often misinterpreted in Western literature as showing a pair of scissors. A Zulfiqar flag used by Selim I (d. 1520) is on exhibit in Topkapı Palace. Two Zulfiqar flags are also depicted in a plate dedicated to Turkish flags in vol. 7 of Bernard Picart's Cérémonies et coutumes religieuses de tous les peuples du monde (1737), attributed to the Janissaries and Sipahis.

During the Tanzimat of 1844, the flags of the Ottoman Empire were redesigned in the style of European armies of the day. The flag of the Ottoman Navy was made red as red was to be the flag of secular institutions and green of religious ones. As the reforms abolished all the various sub-sultanates, pashaliks, beyliks and emirates, a single new flag was designed to replace all the various flags used by these entities with one single national flag. The result was the red and white flag with the crescent moon and star, which is the precursor to the modern Turkish flag. A plain red flag was introduced as the civil ensign for all Ottoman subjects.

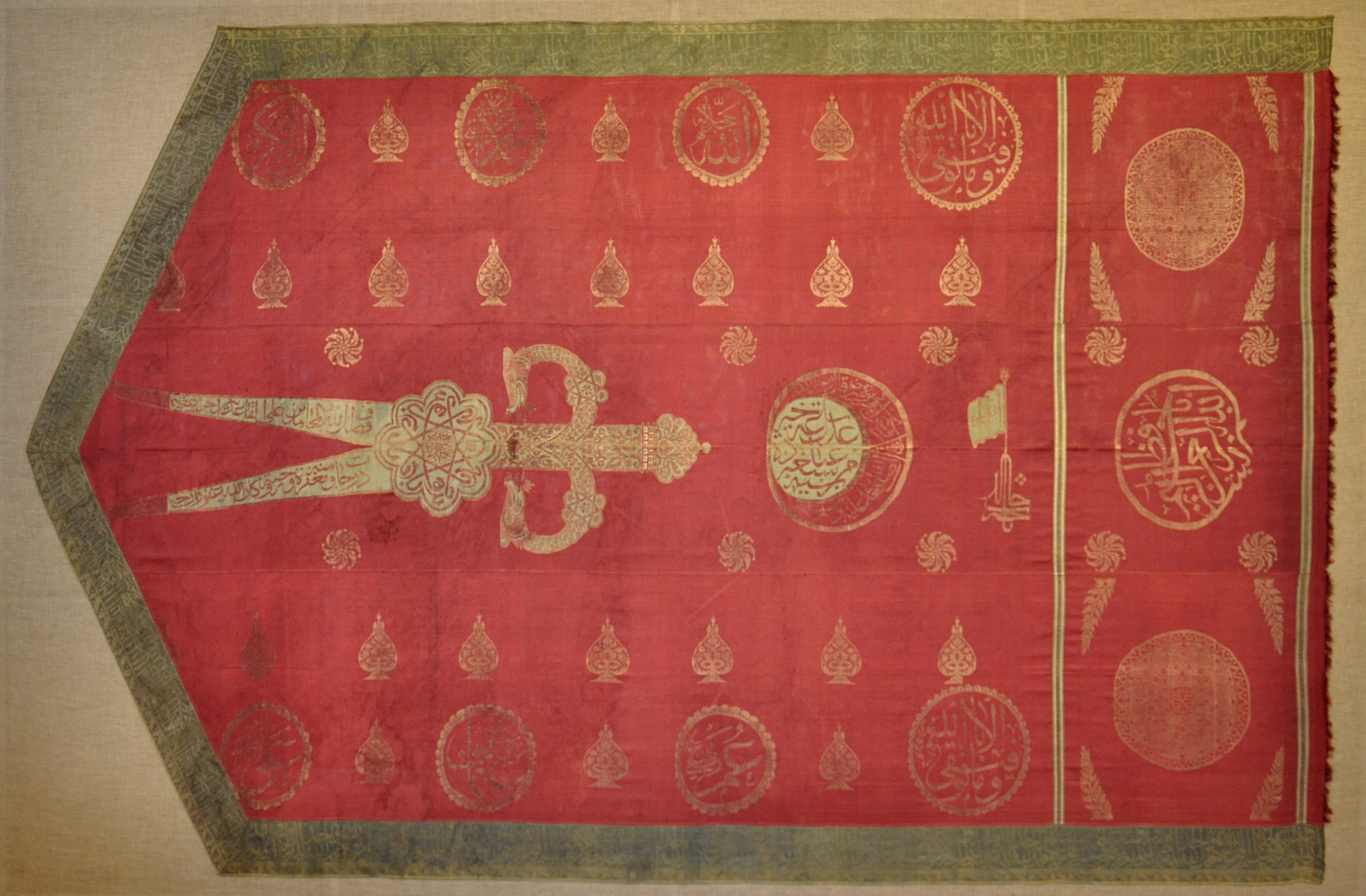
An early 19th-century example of a Zulfiqar flag

The flag of the Ottoman Empire (1844–1922)

The flag of Hayreddin Barbarossa

Mughal Empire

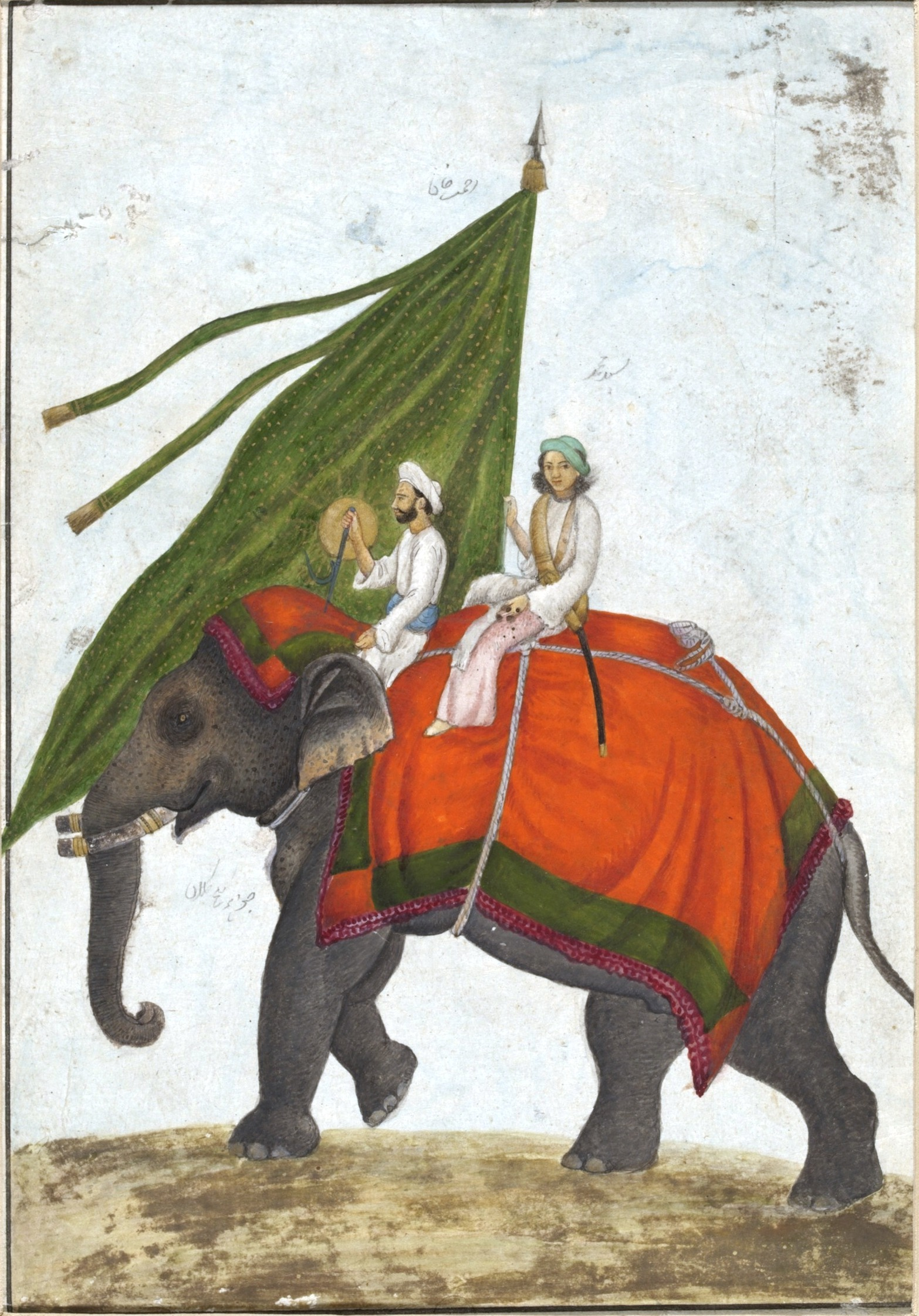
An elephant with a mahout and a standard-bearer carrying a green standard with a gold sun.

The Mughal Empire had a number of imperial flags and standards. The principal imperial standard of the Mughals was known as the alam (Alam علم). It was primarily moss green. It displayed a lion and sun (Shir-u-khurshid شیر و خورشید) facing the hoist of the flag. The Mughals traced their use of the alam back to Timur. The imperial standard was displayed to the right of the throne and also at the entrance of the Emperor's encampment and in front of the emperor during military marches.

According to the Ain-i-Akbari, during Akbar's reign, whenever the emperor rode out, not less than five alams were carried along with the qur (a collection of flags and other insignia) wrapped up in scarlet cloth bags. They were unfurled on the days of festivity, and in battle. Edward Terry, chaplain to Sir Thomas Roe, who came during the reign of Jahangir, described in his Voyage to East-India (1655) that the royal standard, made of silk, with a crouching lion shadowing part of the body of the sun inscribed on it, was carried on an elephant whenever the emperor travelled.

Alam of the Mughal Empire

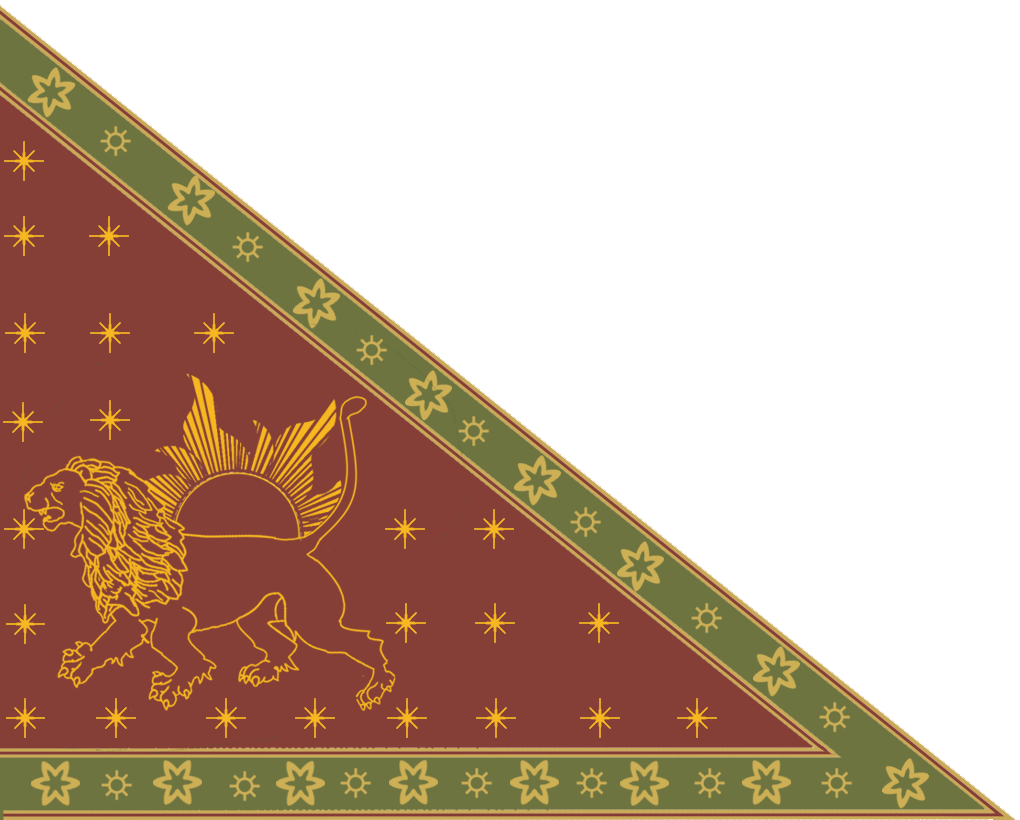
Flag of the Mughal Empire (1631)

Persian Empires

The Safavid dynasty (1501–1736) employed various alams and banners, especially during the reign of the first two kings, each with a different emblem. Ismail I, the first Safavid king, designed a green flag with a golden full moon. In 1524 Tahmasp I replaced the moon with an emblem of a sheep and sun; this flag was used until 1576. It was then that Ismail II adopted the first Lion and Sun device, embroidered in gold, which was to remain in use until the end of the Safavid era. During this period the Lion and Sun stood for two pillars of the society: the state and Islam.

The Afsharid dynasty (1736–1796) had two royal standards, one with red, white, and blue stripes and one with red, blue, white, and yellow stripes. Nader Shah's personal flag was a yellow pennant with a red border and a lion and sun emblem in the centre. All three of these flags were triangular in shape. Nader Shah consciously avoided the using the colour green, as green was associated with Shia Islam and the Safavid dynasty.

Flag of Safavid dynasty after Ismail II (1576–1732)

An Imperial Standard of the Afsharid dynasty

=== Modern history ===
Flags of the Mahdiyya

Flag of the Mahdi movement in Sudan, late 19th century.

Muhammad Ahmad declared himself al-Mahdī al-Muntaẓar (the Expected Rightly-guided One, successor to the prophet Mohammed) in 1881 and lead an Islamic revolution against the Ottoman-Egyptian rule of Sudan until his death in 1885. During the Mahdist War, the followers of al-Mahdi (Anṣār or ‘helpers’) adapted a traditional form of flag used in prayer by followers of Sufi religious orders, for military purposes. Sufi flags typically feature the Muslim shahada – "There is no God but God; Muḥammad is God’s Messenger" – and the name of the sect's founder, an individual usually regarded as a saint. The traditional form of Sufi flag was adapted by adding a quotation from the Quran – "Yā allah yā ḥayy yā qayūm yā ḍhi’l-jalāl wa’l-ikrām" (O God! O Ever-living, O Everlasting, O Lord of Majesty and Generosity) – and the highly charged claim - "Muḥammad al-Mahdī khalifat rasūl Allah" (Muḥammad al-Mahdī is the successor of God's messenger). The flags were specifically colour coded to direct soldiers of the three main divisions of the Mahdist army – the Black, Green and Red Banners (rāyāt).

Star and crescent

By the mid 20th century, the star and crescent was used by a number of successor states of the Ottoman Empire, including Algeria, Azerbaijan, Mauritania, Tunisia, Turkey, the Turkish Republic of Northern Cyprus and Libya. Because of its supposed "Turkic" associations, the symbol also came to be used in Central Asia, as in the flags of Turkmenistan and Uzbekistan. The star-and-crescent in the Flag of Pakistan is stated as symbolizing "progress and light" (while the green colour is stated as representing Islam). The star-and-crescent in these flags was not originally intended as religious symbolism, but an association of the symbol with Islam seems to have developed beginning in the 1950s or 1960s. By the 1970s, this symbol was embraced by both Arab nationalism or Islamism, such as the proposed Arab Islamic Republic (1974) and the American Nation of Islam (1973).

The Pan-Arab flag and colours

The Pan-Arab colors were first introduced in 1916, with the Flag of the Arab Revolt. Although they represent secular Arab nationalism as opposed to Islamism, the choice of colours has been explained by Islamic symbolism in retrospect, so by Mahdi Abdul Hadi in Evolution of the Arab Flag (1986): black as the Black Standard of Muhammad, the Rashidun Caliphate and the Abbasid Caliphate, white as the flag of the Umayyad Caliphate, green as the flag of the Fatimid Caliphate and red as the flag of the Khawarij. On May 30, 1917, Hussein bin Ali, Sharif of Mecca, leader of the Arab Revolt replaced his plain red flag with one horizontally striped in black, green, and white with a red triangular area at the hoist. This was seen as the birth of the pan-Arab flag. Since that time, many Arab nations, upon achieving independence or upon change of political regime, have used a combination of these colours in a design reflecting the Hejaz Revolt flag. These flags include the current flags of Iraq, Syria, Yemen, Egypt, Kuwait, United Arab Emirates, Jordan, Palestinian National Authority, Algeria, and Sudan, and former flags of Iraq and Libya.

The Flag of the Arab Revolt (1916)

The flag of the Arab Islamic Republic (1974)

== Contemporary flags ==
A representation of the shahada, a symbol commonly used as a flag by various Islamist movements

=== Islamic states ===
The modern conceptualization of the Islamic state is attributed to Abul A'la Maududi (1903–1979), a Pakistani Muslim theologian who founded the political party Jamaat-e-Islami and inspired other Islamic revolutionaries such as Ruhollah Khomeini. Six internationally recognized states identify as Islamic states: Saudi Arabia (formed 1932 out of the Wahhabist predecessor states), Pakistan (since 1947), Mauritania (since 1958), Iran (since 1979), Yemen (since 1991). The majority of countries of the Arab world define Islam as their state religion. Most of these states have national flags that include Islamic symbolism. Besides these, there have been unrecognized jihadist de facto states, such as the Islamic State of Iraq and the Levant which at one time controlled parts of Iraq and Syria, the unrecognized government of the Islamic Emirate of Afghanistan, and Al-Shabaab and Boko Haram ruling parts of Somalia and Nigeria respectively, which use jihadist flags.

Some flags of Muslim states use inscribed flags, either with the shahada, as in the flags of Saudi Arabia, or in the case of the 1979 Islamic Republic of Iran, stylized writing of the word Allah. The flag of Iraq uses the pan-Arab colours since 1921, with the addition of the takbir since 1991. The practice of inscribing the shahada on flags may go back to the 18th century, used by the Wahhabi religious movement. In 1902 Ibn Saud, leader of the House of Saud and the future founder of the Kingdom of Saudi Arabia, added a sword to this flag. The current flag of Saudi Arabia is a continuation of the flag of the Emirate of Nejd and Hasa introduced in 1902. The First East Turkestan Republic of 1933 used it on their flag, and the Taliban introduced it on their flag of Afghanistan in 1997.

==== With inscription ====
The flag of Saudi Arabia (1932, based on a 1921 variant), the shahada and a sword on a green field

The flag of Afghanistan, displaying the phrase: "There is no god but God. Mohamed is the messenger of God" in Arabic

The Flag of Somaliland (From 1997), The Shahada (displaying the phrase: "There is no god but God. Mohamed is the messenger of God" in Arabic) and the Green Field represent Islam.

The Flag of Somaliland from 1991-1996. A Green circle surrounded by the Shahada, displaying the phrase: "There is no god but God. Mohamed is the messenger of God" in Arabic

The Flag of Iran (1980), a highly stylized emblem representing the word Allah and Kufic inscprition the phrase "Allah Akbar"

The Flag of Iraq containing colors of the Arab Liberation Flag, with takbīr ʾAllāhu ʾakbar^{u} (ٱللَّٰهُ أَكْبَرُ), meaning "God is greater / the greatest in Kufic script written in the center.

==== With crescent and star ====
Flag of Turkey

Flag of Algeria

Flag of Azerbaijan

Flag of Libya

The Flag of Mauritania (2017, variants since 1959), star-and-crescent on green

The Flag of Pakistan has a dark green to symbolize the Muslim-majority population, and it is also one of the many Muslim flags with a star-and-crescent.

Flag of Tunisia

==== With crescent ====
Flag of Maldives

==== With star ====
Flag of Morocco

==== With Eagle of Saladin ====
Flag of Egypt

Flag of Egypt (1953–1958)

State flag of Palestine

Standard of the President of United Arab Republic (1958–1971)

Presidential standard of South Yemen (1967-1990)

Presidential Standard of Yemen

==== With Hawk of Quraish ====
Flag of Egypt (1972–1984)

Presidential Standard of Egypt (1972-1984)

Flag of Libya (1972–1977)

Flag of Syria (1972–1980)

==== Bahrain ====
The five white triangles on the Flag of Bahrain represent the Five Pillars of Islam

=== Multinational organizations ===
Flag of the Arab League

Flag of the Organisation of Islamic Cooperation

=== Denominational flags ===
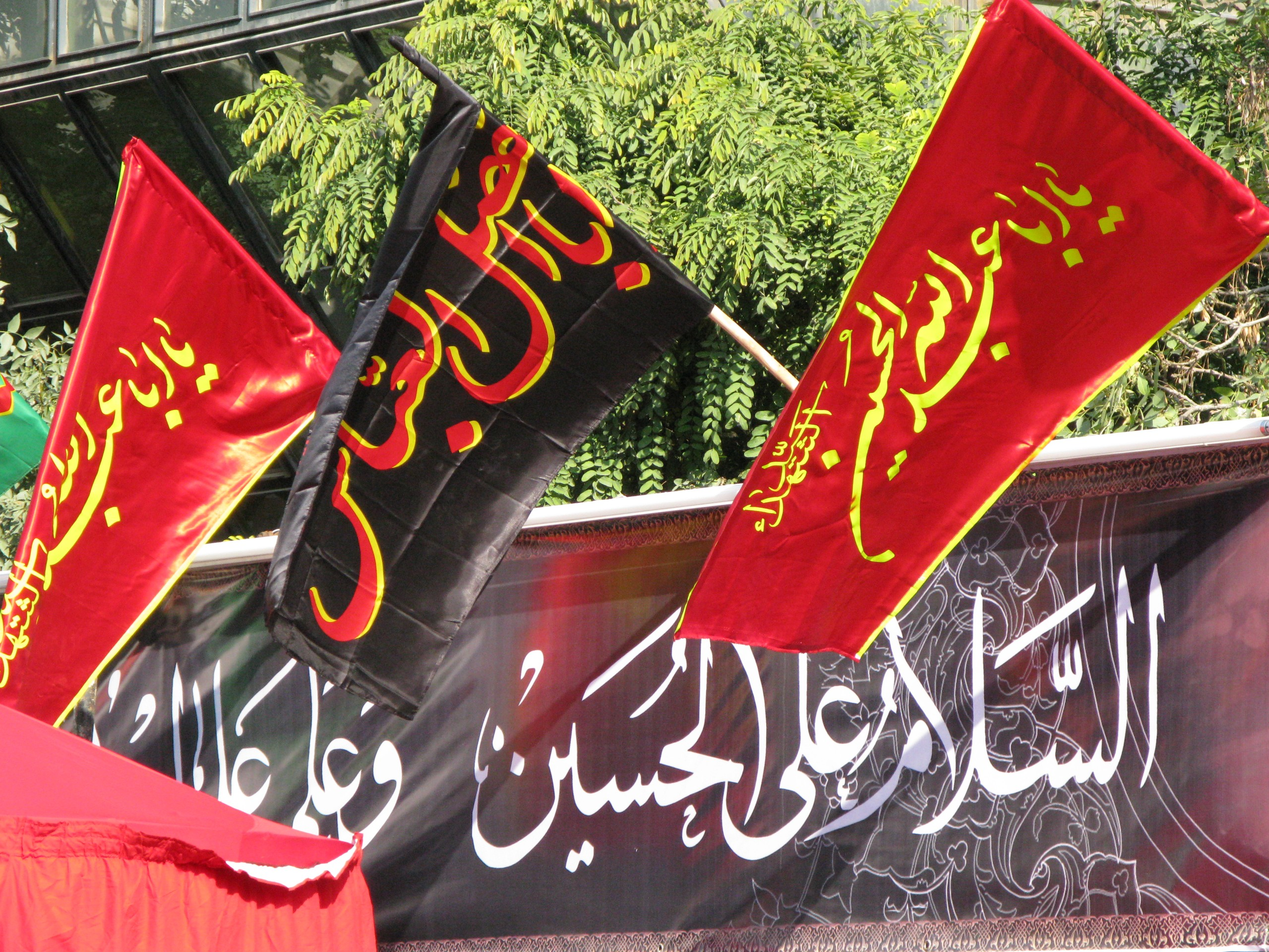
Flags hung during the Mourning of Muharram, Iran.

Although a flag representing Islam as a whole does not exist, some Islamic denominational branches and Sufi brotherhoods employ flags to symbolize themselves. Among specific Islamic branches, Nizari branch of Ismaili-Shia Islam employs an official flag made of green which represents Muhammad's standard and Ali's cloak, as well as a red stripe meaning blood and fire. The flag was ordained by the Aga Khan IV as a part of the new constitution in 1986. The flag is flown on the Ismaili Jamatkhana, a place for congregational worship for Ismaili Muslims during the festive occasions. The Ahmadiyya movement also employs an official flag (Liwaa-i Ahmadiyya) with black and white colors, first hoisted in 1939. Mirza Tahir Ahmad, the fourth caliph of the Ahmadiyya Caliphate, explained the symbolism of the colours black and white in terms of the concept of revelation and prophethood. Muslim African-American religious movement Nation of Islam deploys an official flag known as "The Flag of Islam" which symbolizes universal peace and harmony. Some Muslim communities organized on a national basis by official corporate bodies that have specific denominational commitments, such as the Islamic Community in Bosnia and Herzegovina or the Chief Muftiate (Главно мюфтийство) of Bulgaria, also have flags.

In Shia Muslim traditions, flags are a significant part of the rituals for the Mourning of Muharram. Mourners take round the flags or banners in the ritual known as Alam Gardani as a performance for the mourning ceremonies. Mourners also use flags to signal the beginning and the end of the mourning. All flags have guardians and they are passed down through generations.

The Nizārī Ismā'īlī flag (1986)

The Nation of Islam flag (1973)

The Khatmiyya tariqa flag

Flag of the Ahmadiyya Muslim Jama'at (AMJ)

Flag of the Islamic Community in Bosnia and Herzegovina

Flag of the Chief Muftiate of Bulgaria

Flag of the Deobandi Jamiat Ulema-e-Islam

== See also ==
- Religion in national symbols
- Black Standard
- Christian Flag
- Jihadist flag
