= List of Palestinian flags =

The following is a list of Palestinian flags.

== National flag ==
Flag	Date	Use	Description
	1964–present	Flag of Palestine	Tricolour of three equal horizontal stripes—black, white, and green from top to bottom—overlaid by a red triangle issuing from the hoist. It recalls the pan-Arab colours, which were first combined in the current style during the 1916 Arab Revolt, and represents Palestine and the Palestinian people.
	1997–present	Presidential standard	Standard of the President of Palestine.

== Political and military flags ==
Flag	Date	Use	Description
	?–present	Flag of the Islamic Resistance Movement	A green field bearing the Shahada in white Arabic calligraphy.
	?–present	Flag of the Palestinian National Liberation Movement	
	?–present	Flag of the Democratic Front for the Liberation of Palestine	
	?–present	Flag of the Muslim Struggle Movement in Palestine	
	?–present	Flag of the Vanguard for the Popular Liberation War – Lightning Forces	
	1969–present	Flag of the Popular Front for the Liberation of Palestine	
	?–present	Flag of the Popular Front for the Liberation of Palestine – General Command	
	?–present	Flag of the Palestinian Communist Party	

== Historical flags ==
Flag	Date	Use	Description
	1918–1948	Flag of the United Kingdom	A superimposition of the flags of England and Scotland with the Saint Patrick's Saltire (representing Ireland).
	1920–1948	Flag of the High Commissioner of Palestine	The Union Jack defaced with the phrase "Palestine High Commissioner".
	1927–1948	Palestine Maritime ensign	A Red Ensign with the word "Palestine" on a white disc, flown by ships registered in the British Mandate territory.
	1929–1948	Customs and Postal Banner of Palestine	A Blue Ensign with the word "Palestine" on a white disc.
	1936–1939	Flag used during the 1936–1939 Arab revolt	
	1945–1948	Flag of Palestine used by the Arab League	A white field with the name of the country in red Arabic text in the center.
	1948–1959	All-Palestine	Flag of the Arab Revolt.
	1948–1958	Flag of the Kingdom of Egypt and the co-official flag of the Arab Republic of Egypt	A green field with a white crescent containing three white five-pointed stars.
	1948–1967	Jordanian administered West Bank, Palestine	Flag of Jordan, used during its administration of the Palestinian territory of the West Bank.
	1952–1958	Flag of the 1952 Egyptian Revolution and the Republic of Egypt	Following the Revolution of 1952, the Free Officers retained the flag of the Kingdom, but also introduced the former Republic of Egypt flag colors of red, white, and black horizontal bands, with the emblem of the Revolution, the Eagle of Saladin, in the center band, with a green escutcheon with a white crescent and three five pointed stars.
	1959–1967	Egyptian administered Gaza, Palestine	Flag of the United Arab Republic, used during its administration of the Palestinian territory of Gaza.
	1964–1993	Palestine Liberation Organization	Flag of Palestine with a shorter triangle.
	1994–present	Flag of the Palestinian National Authority	Based on the Palestine Liberation Organization flag.

== Proposed flags ==
Flag	Date	Designer	Description	Notes/Refs.
	9 November 1929	Husein Mikdadi	An upside-down Arab Revolt flag with a white symbol in the triangle consisting of a Latin cross within a crescent.	
	1929	"Jawad Ismail"		
	1929	"An Arab From Haifa"		
	1929	"An Arab From Haifa"	Three horizontal stripes of black, white, and green; in a red triangle at the hoist, a white symbol consisting of a Latin cross within a crescent.	
	1929	Elias Hana Rantissi	Three vertical stripes – green, white, and black, with a red disc in the white band.	
	1929	Hamdi Can'an	Three horizontal stripes – black, green, and white, with a red triangle at the hoist containing three white stars.	
	25 October 1929	Assma Tubi		
	9 November 1929	"Jalili"		
	1929	As’ad Shufani		
	1929	Filastin Newspaper		
	1929	Theodore Saruf		
	1929	Munir Dakak		
	1929	Anonymous		

== See also ==
- Flag of Palestine
- Emblem of Palestine
