= Flag of Syria =

Syrian Arab Republic
- Other names: Flag of the Syrian Arab Republic, Revolution flag; Independence flag
- Use: National flag
- Proportion: 2:3 (Note: Per the 2025 Constitutional Declaration of the Syrian Arab Republic. The Ministry of Foreign Affairs and Expatriates uses a 3:5 ratio version, while the Presidency uses a variation with smaller stars.) (Note: The 1930 independence flag has a 1:2 ratio and smaller, more evenly spaced stars.)
- Adopted: 14 May 1930; 96 years ago (first adopted under a 1:2 ratio); Late 2011; 15 years ago (first used by the Syrian opposition); 8 December 2024; 23 months ago (first used by the Syrian caretaker government, de facto); 13 March 2025; 20 months ago (official adoption)
- Designed by: Parliamentary committee led by Ibrahim Hananu (Note: 1930 1:2 variation only.)

The national flag of Syria, commonly known as the Syrian flag or the flag of the Syrian Arab Republic, is a rectangular tricolour featuring three stars. It consists of three equal horizontal stripes of green, white, and black, from top to bottom, with three red five-pointed stars centered in the white stripe, which has a length equal to 2.3 its width.

The design was first used as the independence flag, with a 1:2 proportion, during the First and Second Syrian Republics. The green stripe represented the Rashidun Caliphate, the white stripe represented the Umayyad Caliphate, and the black stripe represented the Abbasid Caliphate. Originally, the three red stars represented the three states of Syria: the State of Aleppo, the State of Damascus, and the State of Deir ez-Zor. The independence flag was designed by a parliamentary committee led by nationalist leader Ibrahim Hananu.

After gaining full independence from France in 1946, Syria used a number of different flags, all featuring the pan-Arab colors of green, black, white, and red. During the Ba'athist period, the independence flag was replaced by the flag of the United Arab Republic, a red, white, and black triband with either two or three green stars, or with the national coat of arms. In March 2025, the Constitutional Declaration of 2025 formally designated the revolution flag as the national flag of Syria, with a 2:3 proportion.

== Design ==
=== Construction ===
Construction sheet of the Syrian flag

=== Color scheme ===
Color scheme	Green	White	Black	Red	Gold
RGB	0–122–61	255–255–255	0–0–0	206–17–38	239–187–34
Hexadecimal	#007A3D	#FFFFFF	#000000	#CE1126	#EFBB22
CMYK	89, 27, 100, 15	0, 0, 0, 0	75, 68, 67, 90	12, 100, 98, 3	7, 26, 99, 0
Pantone	—	White	Black	186 C	7409 C
Valid for					

=== Specifications ===
The flag of Syria is defined in Article 6 of the Constitutional Declaration of 2025.

The Syrian flag will be as follows: The flag is rectangular in shape, the length of which is equal to two-thirds of its width. It includes three equal rectangles, green at the top, white in the middle, and black at the bottom. In the middle of the flag, within the white space, are three red stars.

— Constitutional Declaration, Article 6

== Historic flags of Syria ==
=== Kingdom of Syria (1920) ===
Flag of the Arab Kingdom of Syria in 1920

Flag of the Syrian Federation (1922–1925) and the State of Syria (1925–1930)

The Ottoman flag had been used in Syria until the Ottomans left the country on 18 September 1918. In 1918, the official flag of Syria was the Faisal flag, or Flag of the Arab Revolt, the flag of the 1916–1918 Arab Revolt against the Ottomans. It was officially adopted by the Hashemite family on 30 September 1918 and remained in use until 8 March 1920. This was the first flag to use the green-red-white-black combination seen in most subsequent Syrian flags. The colors' symbolism has been described as follows: white for the Damascene Umayyad period, green for the Caliph Ali, red for the Khawarij radical Islamic movement, and black for the Islamic prophet Muhammad, showing the "political use of religion" in opposition to the increasingly secularized Turkish colonial rule. Alternately, it has been argued that the horizontal colors stand for the Abbasid (black), Umayyad (white) and Fatimid (green) Caliphates, with the red triangle symbolising the Hashemite dynasty.

Under the Arab Kingdom of Syria, the Faisal flag was redesigned with a seven-pointed white star imposed on the red triangle, and was in use until 24 July 1920. This flag was officially adopted by Jordan in April 1928.

=== French Mandate flags (1920–1930) ===
The Faisal flag was abandoned with the arrival of French colonialism. The French High Commissioner for Syria, General Henri Gouraud adopted the new flag of the French Mandate of Syria (blue with a white crescent) on 24 July 1920. The flag was based on the flag of the Shebab Emirate used between 1697 and 1842, which stood for "the love of peace". Gouraud's flag was in use until 1 September 1920, after which Syria was split into separate territories, each eventually given its own flag (see below). On 22 June 1922 Gouraud established the Federation of Syria, which used a green-white-green flag with a French flag canton. When this federation was consolidated into the State of Syria in 1925 the same flag continued to be used until the establishment of the republic on 14 May 1930.

=== First republican flag (1930–1958, 1961–1963) ===
The 1930 Independence Flag (1930–1958, 1961–1963)

The flag of the newly established Syrian Republic under the French mandate was defined by the 1930 constitution. The constitution was drafted by a parliamentary committee led by nationalist leader Ibrahim Hananu. At first, French authorities refused to allow the constituent assembly to ratify the constitution, and Henri Ponsot, the High Commissioner of the Levant, dissolved the assembly on 5 February 1929. After a public uproar, French authorities rescinded their decision and decided to approve the draft with some changes. On 14 May 1930, Ponsot issued decree number 3111, which approved the Syrian-drafted "Constitution of the Syrian Republic", and which in Article IV of Part I states:

"[The] Syrian flag will be as follows: length double width, and is divided into three parallel and equal colours, the highest green, white then black, that the white section contains in a straight line three red five-pointed stars".

— Article IV, Part I, Constitution of the Syrian Republic

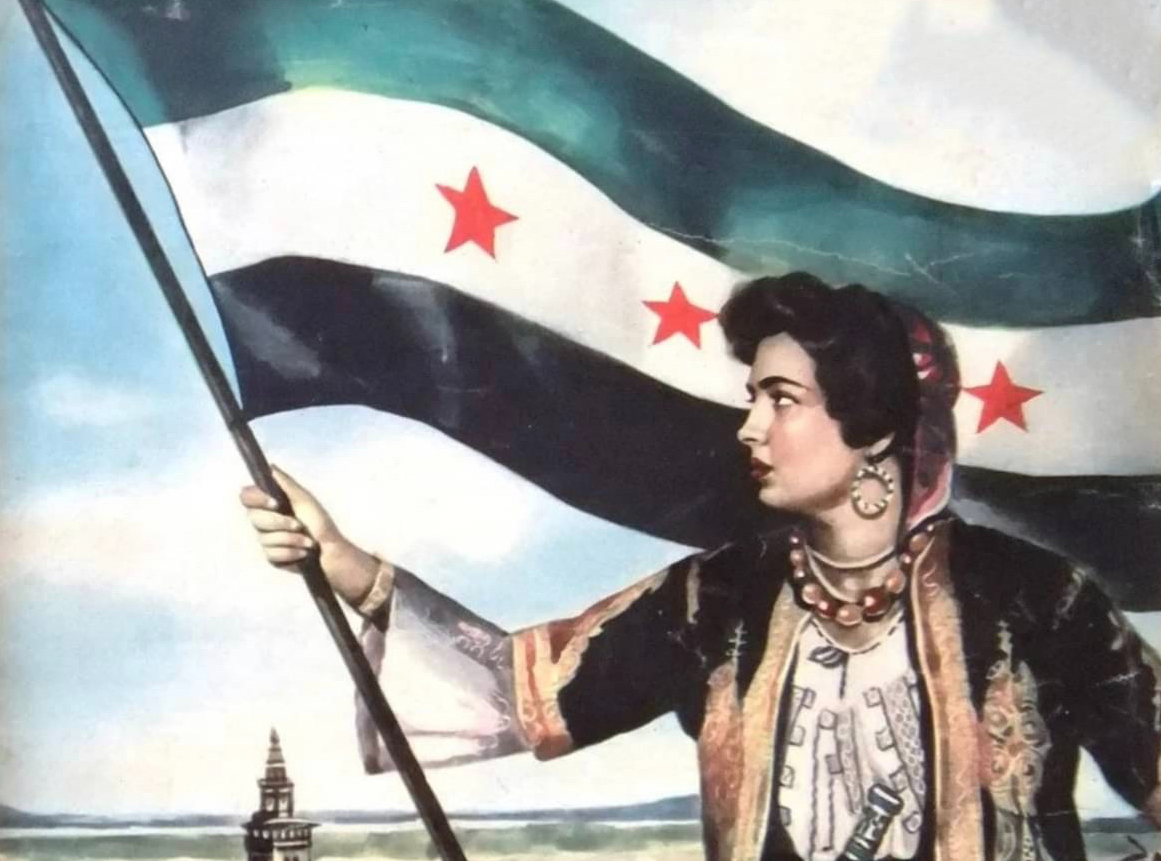
Portrait of a woman with the national flag of Syria, also known as the Independence flag.

The flag's green colour stood for the Rashidun, white represented the Umayyads and black symbolised the Abbasids. Originally, the three red stars represented the three districts of Syria: the "states" of Aleppo, Damascus, and Deir ez-Zor. In 1936, the Sanjak of Latakia and Jebel Druze were added to Syria, and the representation of the three stars was changed, with the first representing the districts of Aleppo, Damascus and Deir ez-Zor, the second Jebel Druze, and the final star representing Sanjak of Latakia. The flag was used as a symbol for the desire for autonomy, for Syrians to rally around when France reneged on its agreement to leave the country, due to the outbreak of World War II. The symbolism was as follows: black for the dark oppressed past, white for a promising future and red for the blood to be sacrificed to move from the former to the latter. The flag was adopted when Syria gained its independence on 17 April 1946. The standard was used until the creation of the United Arab Republic, a state union of Syria and Egypt, in 1958. After the collapse of the United Arab Republic, Syria continued to use the UAR's flag until 28 September 1961, when the independence flag was restored to disassociate Syria from the former failed union.

=== United Arab Republic (1958–1961) ===
Syria united with Egypt in February 1958 to form the United Arab Republic (UAR). Gamal Abdel Nasser, who was the president of Egypt and later president of the UAR, introduced a new flag in April 1958 to replace the previous independence flag and promote Arab unity. The new flag featured red, white, and black horizontal bands from the Egyptian revolutionary flag, with two green stars representing Egypt and Syria. It was based on the Arab Liberation Flag of the Egyptian Revolution of 1952, which used four pan-Arab colours—black, green, white, and red—representing the Abbasid, Fatimid, Umayyad, and Hashemite dynasties. However, the new UAR flag had two stars to represent the two parts of the UAR.

=== Ba'athist Syria (1963–2024) ===
Following the 1963 Ba'athist coup d'état, and the agreement over the formation of a United Arab Republic between Egypt, Syria, and Iraq, a new flag was adopted by its Revolutionary Command Council on 1 May 1963, and was used until 1 January 1972. This flag was not much different from the flag of the UAR, with only a change from two stars to three, in order to represent the addition of Iraq to the Federation. The three stars represented the unity of Egypt, Syria and Iraq, as well as three pillars of Ba'athism: unity, freedom, and socialism. Some variations of the red-white-black flag have been used in various Arab Unions of Syria with Egypt, Libya, Sudan, Yemen, and Iraq. President Hafez al-Assad adopted a new flag on 1 January 1972, as Syria joined Egypt and Libya in the Federation of Arab Republics. The green stars were replaced by the Hawk of Quraish (the symbol of the tribe of Muhammad). The eagle held the ribbon with the name of the Federation, but unlike Egypt and Libya, Syria did not include its name on the coat of arms. This flag was an official flag during the Yom Kippur War in 1973. The Federation was dissolved in 1977, but Syria continued to use the flag for the next three years. The flag was abrogated on 29 March 1980, and replaced by the two-star flag. Although Syria is not part of any Arab state union, the flag of the United Arab Republic was readopted in order to show Syria's commitment to Arab unity. Since the Syrian revolution and subsequent fall of the Assad regime in 2024, the flag is no longer in use but loyalists of the deposed Assad regime continue to use the Ba'athist Syrian flag in parts of Western Syria.

=== Restoration of the Revolution/Independence Flag (from 2011) ===
==== Syrian Revolution and Civil War (2011–2024) ====
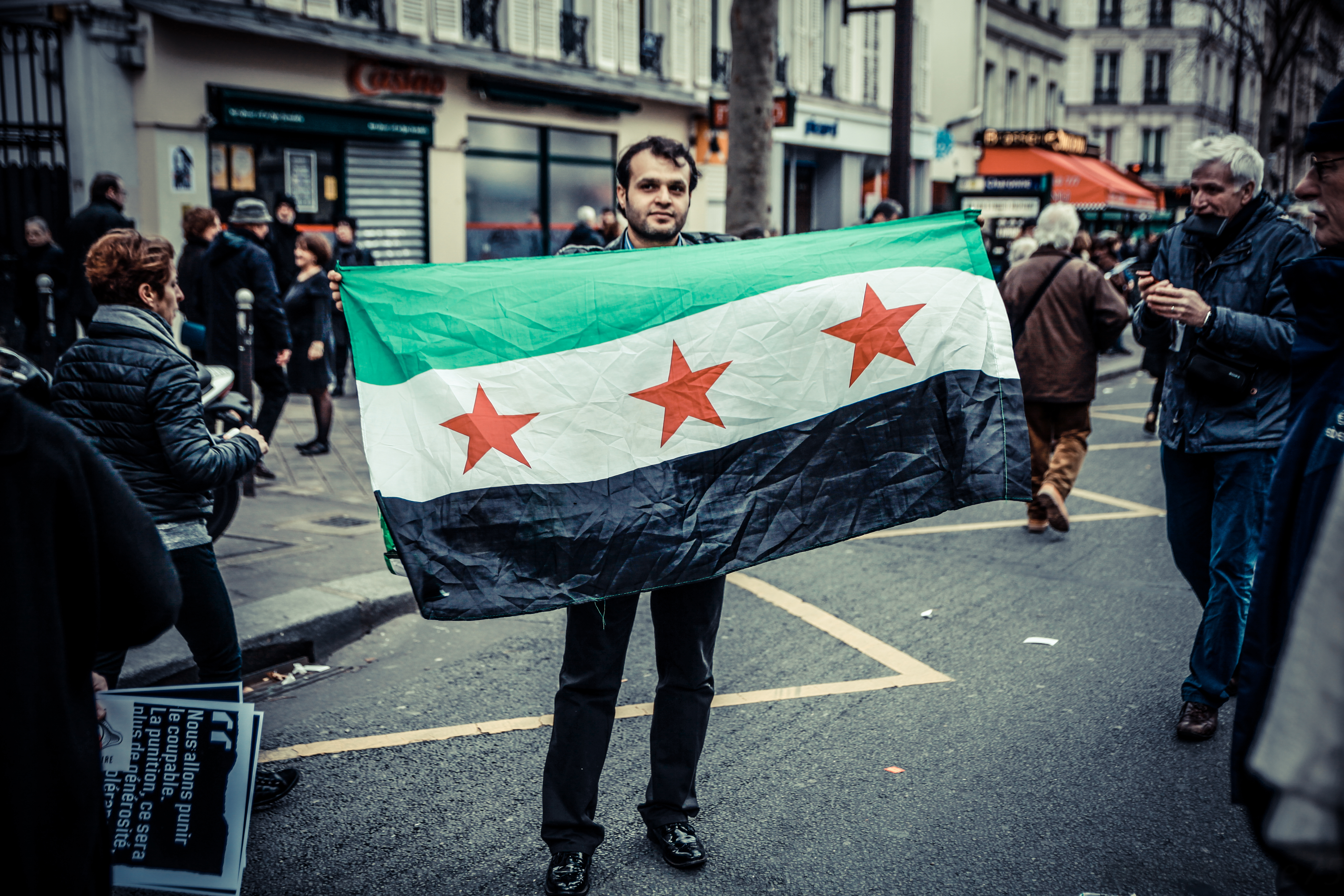
Man holding the independence flag in Paris

In 2006, Safouh Al Barazi, a lifelong Syrian activist and member of a prominent family from Hama, launched a campaign in Canada advocating the restoration of the pre-Ba'athist Syrian flag. Featuring green, white, and black horizontal stripes with three red stars, it closely resembled the flag used by Syria following its independence from the French Mandate in 1946. Al Barazi first publicly presented the flag, bearing his signature, at a conference in Montreal, Canada, in 2006.

Al Barazi's campaign aimed to symbolize a return to Syria's democratic roots and to unite opposition to the ruling regime. His efforts gained support among Syrian diaspora communities in Canada, the United States, particularly in Washington, D.C., and elsewhere, contributing to the flag's resurgence as the principal symbol of the Syrian opposition during the civil uprising that began in 2011.

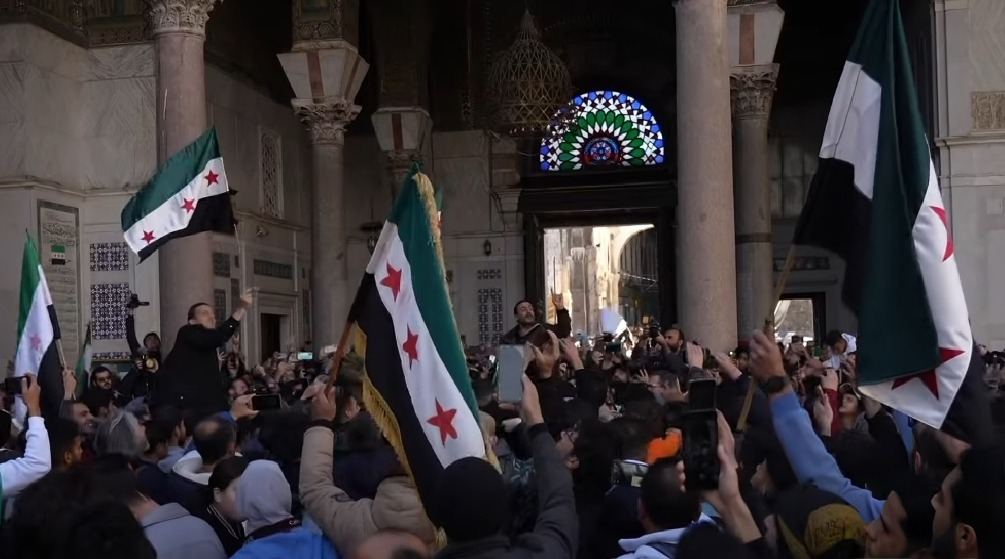
Syrians wave the Syrian flag at the Umayyad Mosque following the fall of the Assad regime in December 2024.

The revolution flag has since been widely adopted by various opposition groups and protesters, both within Syria and among the diaspora, as a symbol of freedom and democratic aspirations. Al Barazi continued to promote the flag among Syrian diaspora communities in Canada and the United States, contributing to its growing recognition before it was widely adopted by the Syrian opposition during the uprising that began in 2011.

During the Syrian civil war, the Syrian opposition, represented first by the Syrian National Council and later by the National Coalition of Syrian Revolutionary and Opposition Forces (commonly known as the Syrian National Coalition), adopted the independence flag first used in 1932. The flag began to serve as a universal symbol of the protest movement in late 2011. The opposition used the flag to distinguish itself from the Assad regime, favoring the banner associated with Syria's independence from France. It was primarily flown in areas under opposition control. The use of the revolution flag was comparable to the Libyan rebels' adoption of the pre-Gaddafi red, black, green, and white Libyan flag of the Kingdom of Libya in opposition to Muammar Gaddafi's green flag.

==== Transitional Period (2024–present) ====
Following the fall of the Assad regime, the HTS-dominated Syrian caretaker government used the revolution flag. The flag was also adopted by the Democratic Autonomous Administration of North and East Syria some days later. The caretaker government additionally displayed a Tawhid flag depicting the Shahada in black on a white field at its first meeting, which led to criticism for its association with Sunni fundamentalist groups such as the Taliban.

On 13 March 2025, the Constitutional Declaration retained the revolution flag as the national flag of Syria, with a 2:3 proportion. On 31 March 2025, Apple's iOS became the first operating system to update their Syrian flag emoji to display the current revolution flag. Other companies followed suit a few months later. On 25 April 2025, Syrian Foreign Minister Asaad al-Shaibani raised the flag during a ceremony at the United Nations Headquarters in New York, where he was also scheduled to attend a United Nations Security Council. The United Nations also updated the Syrian flag on its list of member states.

On 4 June 2025, a 600-square-meter Syrian flag was raised atop the country's tallest flagpole, which stands 110 meters high, during a ceremony at Umayyad Park attended by Culture Minister Mohammed Yassin Saleh, Tourism Minister Mazen al-Salhani, and Damascus Governor Maher Marwan. On 20 September 2025, al-Shaibani raised the Syrian flag at the Syrian embassy in Washington, D.C. for the first time since the mission was suspended in 2012.

== See also ==
- List of Syrian flags
- National symbols of Syria
- Emblem of Syria
- Pan-Arab colors
- Flag of the Arab Revolt
- Flag of Bahrain
- Flag of Egypt
- Flag of Iraq
- Flag of Jordan
- Flag of Kuwait
- Flag of Palestine
- Flag of Sudan
- Flag of the United Arab Emirates
- Flag of Yemen

== Bibliography ==
- Goodarzi, Jubin M. (2006). Syria and Iran: Diplomatic Alliance and Power Politics in the Middle East. I.B. Tauris. ISBN 978-1-84511-127-4.
- Heydemann, Steven (1999). Authoritarianism in Syria: Institutions and Social Conflict, 1946–1970. Cornell University Press. ISBN 978-0-8014-2932-3.
- Lawson, Fred H. (2006). Constructing International Relations in the Arab World. Stanford University Press. ISBN 978-0-8047-5372-2.
- King, Stephen J. (2009). The New Authoritarianism in the Middle East and North Africa. Indiana University Press. ISBN 978-0-253-35397-9.
- Podeh, Elie (1999). The Decline of Arab Unity: The Rise and Fall of the United Arabic Republic. Sussex Academic Press. ISBN 978-1-902210-20-9.
- Schumann, Cristoph (2008). Liberal Thought in the Eastern Mediterranean: Late 19th Century Until the 1960s. BRILL. ISBN 9789004165489.
- Thomas, Martin (2007). Empires of Intelligence: Security Services and Colonial Disorder after 1914. University of California Press. ISBN 978-0-520-25117-5.
- Thompson, Elizabeth (2000). Colonial Citizens: Republican Rights, Paternal Privilege, and Gender in French Syria and Lebanon. Columbia University Press. ISBN 978-0-231-10661-0.
