= Ashurkhana Sayyid Jamshed Ali Khan =

Ashurkhana in Hyderabad in Andhra Pradesh, India

- Lohe Ki Kamaan
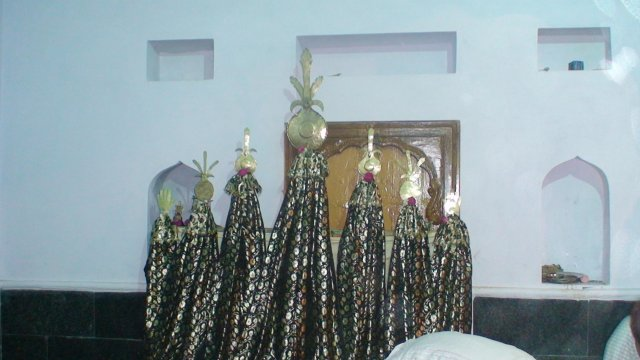
- Ashurkhana Sayyid Jamshed Ali Khan

Religion
- Affiliation: Islam
- Region: Hyderabad
- Rite: Shia
- Ecclesiastical or organisational status: Ashurkhana
- Leadership: GROH E SHAIDA E ABUL FAZL A.S ESTD 1965
- Year consecrated: 1650
- Status: Active

Location
- Location: Hyderabad
- State: Andhra Pradesh
- Territory: India

The Ashurkhana Sayyid Jamshed Ali Khan, also known as the Lohe Ki Kamaan, is an ashurkhana in Hyderabad in Andhra Pradesh, India. It was built during the Qutb Shahi dynasty in 1060 hijri (1650 AD) during the reign of Abdullah Qutb Shah.

The entrance gate to the ashurkhana has a wooden tablet engraved with verses from the Quran, and the date of the building's construction. This ashurkhana houses alams (standards) of a unique type which were installed by Nawab Sayyid Mukarram Ali Khan (Qaisar Jang), son of Nawab Sayyid Muhammad Ali Khan (Azim Jang Azim Ud-Daula) the grandson of the famous general of the Mughal king Farrukhsiyar Sayyid Hussain Ali Khan (Amiral Umra), one of the kingmaking Sayyid Brothers during the Mughal period.

== History ==
Sayyid Mukarram Ali Khan was an eminent noble during the period of the third Nizam of Hyderabad, Sikander Jah. He and his son Nawab Sayyid Jamshed Ali Khan (Ibne-Qaisar Jang) were among the great nobles of the period, the Umra e Uzzam. The alams, installed in 1220 hijri, are of the Asaf Jahi period during Sikander Jah's reign. The alams bear the engravings on their reverse side. The alams are uniquely in the shape of a tughra, the only known representatives of this type.

The descendants of Sayyid Jamshed Ali Khan are collectively known as Khanwada e Qaisar Jang. This family of sayyids has a Shajra-e-Nasab (family tree) tracing from Imam Hussein ibn Ali and Zayn al-‘Ābidīn. One of the grandsons of Sayyid Jamshed Ali Khan, Mir Durray Ali Khan (Fauq), was prominent among the poets of Hyderabad. He devised tunes (taraz) for the Marsiya, which are still followed by khawans of Hyderabad.

== Tabarrukat ==
The ashurkhana houses many tabarrukat (relics) of holy value in Shia Islam.

- The Tasbih-e-Khake Shifa turns blood red at the time of Asr e Tang (the time of Shahadat e Imam Hussain). Every year this tasbih is shown publicly on the Day of Ashura (10th Muharram).
- The Shabih-e-Mubarak are some very old miniature paintings of the prophet, Imam Ali and Imam Hussain, which are also shown on the same day.
- The sacred robe Payrahan-e-Mubarak of Imam Zayn al-‘Ābidīn, the fourth Shi'a Imam: this holy relic once belonged to the family of Jamshed Ali Khan Qaisar Jang. It was shown along with the Tasbih-e-Khake shifa. This sacred robe is cared for by the Shaheed Yar Jang family and is shown publicly yearly in the month of Muharrum at Devdi Inayath Jang.
- The Minbar of this ashurkhana is unique, as it resembles the Takht e Taus, the Peacock Throne of Mughal India.
