= Flag of the Arab Federation =

Hashemite Arab Federation
- Use: Civil flag and ensign
- Proportion: 1:2
- Adopted: 14 February 1958
- Relinquished: 2 August 1958
- Design: Horizontal black, white, and green stripes with a red triangle at hoist. The colors are the Pan-Arab Colors.

In 1958, in response to the merger of Egypt and Syria in the United Arab Republic, the two Hashemite kingdoms of Iraq and Jordan established the Arab Federation, a confederation of the two states. According to the 7th article of the Federation convention, the Arab revolt flag was to be the official flag of the Union. The union lasted less than six months, being terminated by the Iraqi Revolution of 1958 in July.

== Description ==
The flag is a tricolor of three equal horizontal stripes (black, white, and green from top to bottom) overlaid by a red triangle issuing from the hoist. These are the Pan-Arab colors. The flag is similar to the flags of Jordan, the Kingdom of Iraq, and Western Sahara, all of which draw their inspiration from the Arab Revolt against Ottoman rule (1916–1918). The flag of the Arab Revolt had the same graphic form as the Flag of the Arab Federation and Palestine, but the colors were arranged differently (white on the bottom, rather than in the middle).
