= Sancak-ı Şerif =

Alleged standard of Muhammad, kept in Topkapı Palace in Istanbul

- سنجاق شريف
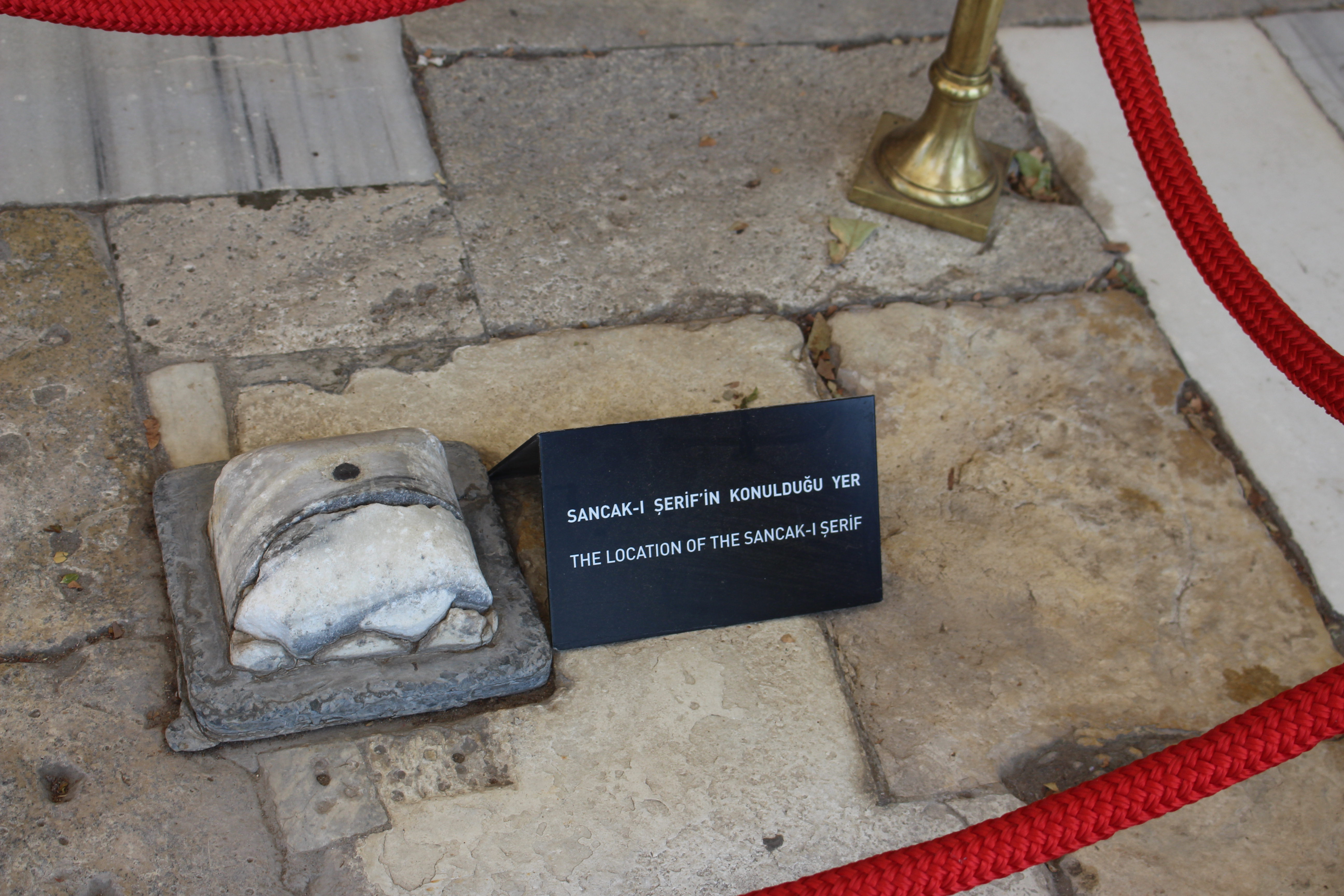
- Marker of the location of the Sancak-ı Şerif, the Imperial Treasury, Topkapı Palace
- Type: Banner
- Material: Black wool
- Created: c. 622-632 CE
- Period/culture: Early Muslim conquests
- Discovered: 1517 CE; Egypt
- Discovered by: Selim I
- Present location: Topkapı Palace
- Culture: Islamic culture

The Sancak-ı Şerif (Ottoman Turkish: سنجاق شريف, lit. 'great flag') is the alleged original standard of the Islamic prophet Muhammad. Also known by names such as Rasûlüllah (s.a.s)'a ait sancak (the Prophet's banner), Âlem-i nebi, Âlem-i şerif, Liva-i saadet, and Liva-i şerif, it is a profoundly significant banner currently housed kept along with other relics of Muhammad in the treasury of the Topkapı Palace, in Istanbul.

According to legend, the flag was used in the first Muslim wars; then passed into the hands of the Umayyads and Abbasids; and finally, with Selim I's conquest of Egypt in 1517, fell into Ottoman hands. The Ottomans carried the flag into battle, beginning with their Hungarian campaign circa 1521.

Following the conquest of Egypt in 1517 by Yavuz Sultan Selim (1512-1520), the Sancak-ı Şerif and other sacred trusts (Emânât-ı Mübâreke) were brought to Istanbul. Yavuz Sultan Selim's conquest of Egypt in 1517 marked a significant transfer of the caliphate from the Abbasids to the Ottomans. There are varying accounts of its transfer: some suggest Sultan Selim (the grim) brought it directly from his Egyptian campaign, others state it was sent to Kanuni Sultan Süleyman during the siege of Rhodes by Hayır Bey, the Mamluk governor of Egypt. Another indicates it was sent from Damascus to Istanbul. Upon its arrival, Sultan Selim ensured its preservation with great reverence in his throne room at Topkapı Palace, where the Hırka-i Şerif (Mantle of Felicity) Chamber was built for them.

According to Ottoman historian Silahdar Findiklili Mehmed Agha (d. 1727), the flag was made of black wool.

Its final significant use was in 1826 during the Janissary revolt. It was taken from its place and erected on the minbar of the Sultan Ahmed Mosque. The public, considering it a religious obligation (farz) to gather and fight under it, rallied around the Sancak-ı Şerif, supporting Sultan Mahmud II in the elimination of the Janissaries. The Janissaries, who had planned to seize the Sancak-ı Şerif themselves, were bombarded with cannons, and the revolt ended, an event known as "Vak'a-i Hayriyye" (Auspicious Incident). The Sancak-ı Şerif was also brought out during the declaration of Jihad-ı Ekber in World War I on November 24, 1914.

It was believed that if the Ottoman state, or Islam generally, were threatened with extreme danger, the flag should be taken into the field by the Ottoman sultan personally, whereupon every Muslim capable of taking arms must rally under the flag.

The banner itself, being made of wool, is deteriorated and not on display. It is kept in a green satin bag in a silver chest in the sacred relics chamber of the Topkapı Palace.

== See also ==
- Black Standard
- Relics of Muhammad
