= Flag of the Arab Revolt =

- Flag of Hejaz
- Proportion: 2:3
- Adopted: 10 June 1916
- Design: A red triangle based at the hoist to which three parallel horizontal colours are attached, black at the top, followed by green in the middle and white at the bottom.
- Designed by: Mark Sykes
- Later design

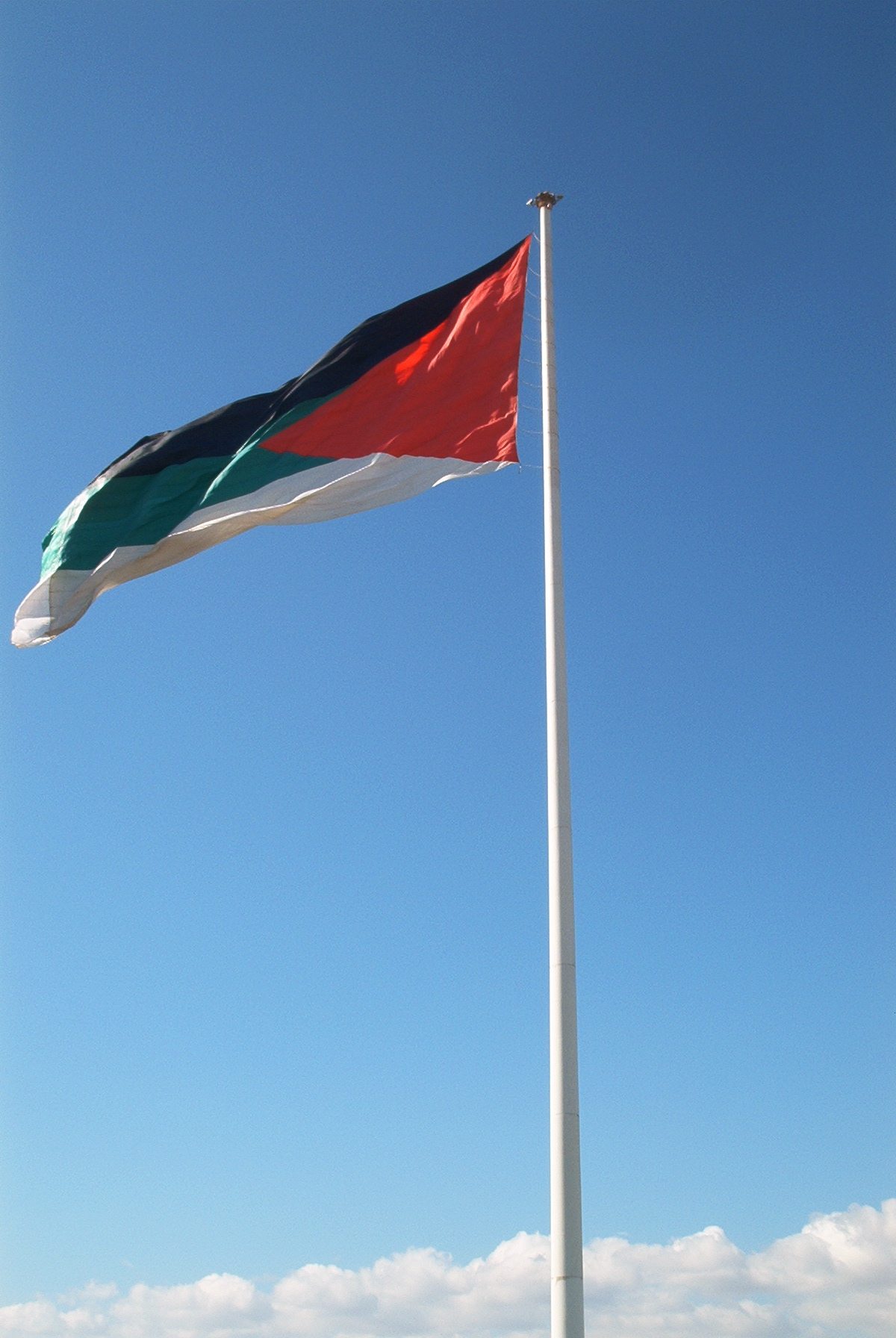
The flag of the Arab revolt – Aqaba, 2006

The flag of the Arab Revolt (Arabic: علم الثورة العربية), also used as the flag of Hejaz (Arabic: علم مملكة الحجاز), was a flag used by Hussein bin Ali and his allies, the Arab nationalists, during the Arab Revolt against the Ottoman Empire during World War I, and as the first flag of the Kingdom of Hejaz. It was designed by Mark Sykes, but has palettes reminiscent of previous Arab flags, such as the flags of the al-Muntada al-Adabi, al-ʽAhd and al-Fatat.

The flag consists of three horizontal stripes (black, white, and green) and a red triangle on the hoist side, using Islamic religious tradition, each color has a symbolic meaning: black represents the Abbasid dynasty and Rashidun caliphs, white represents the Umayyad dynasty, and green represents Islam (or possibly, but it is not certain, the Fatimid dynasty). The red triangle represents the Hashemite dynasty, to which Hussein bin Ali belonged.

The flag became a symbol of Arab nationalism and unity and the colors derived from it are still used today in various forms in the flags of Jordan, Kuwait, Sudan, Syria, the United Arab Emirates, Palestine, the Sahrawi Arab Democratic Republic, and Libya.

The Arab revolt flag influenced the related Arab Liberation Flag, which was adopted as a result of the 1952 Egyptian revolution. The tricolor flag consists of red, white, and black horizontal stripes. Variants of the flag are currently used as the national flags of Egypt, Iraq, Sudan, and Yemen.

== Symbolism ==
The horizontal colors stand for the Abbasid Caliphate (black), Umayyad Caliphate (white) and Rashidun Caliphate (green). The red triangle has been described as referring to the Hashemites or the ashraf of Mecca.

According to Tim Marshall, white was the Umayyad colour in memory of Muhammad's first military victory, black was the Abbasid colour to mark a new era and to mourn the dead of the Battle of Karbala, and green was the colour of the Prophet's coat and of his followers as they conquered Mecca. Alternatively, the colours' symbolism has been described as follows: white for the Damascene Umayyad Caliphate, green for Ali, red for the Kharijites, and black for Muhammad, showing the "political use of religion" in opposition to the increasingly secularized Turkish rule.

Similarly, Marshall explains the use of the European tricolor as a sign of the break with the Ottoman past, while the colours are deeply Islamic without using the star and crescent used by the Ottomans. The explanation given in the official note of the ceremony marking the first anniversary of the Revolt, celebrating Hussein's decree on the adoption of the flag, was that black represented the Black Standard of Muhammad (the al-ʿuqāb "eagle"), his companions, and the Abbasid Caliphate, the green represented the Ahl al-Bayt or Prophetic Family, white various Arab rulers, and red the Hashemites.

== History ==
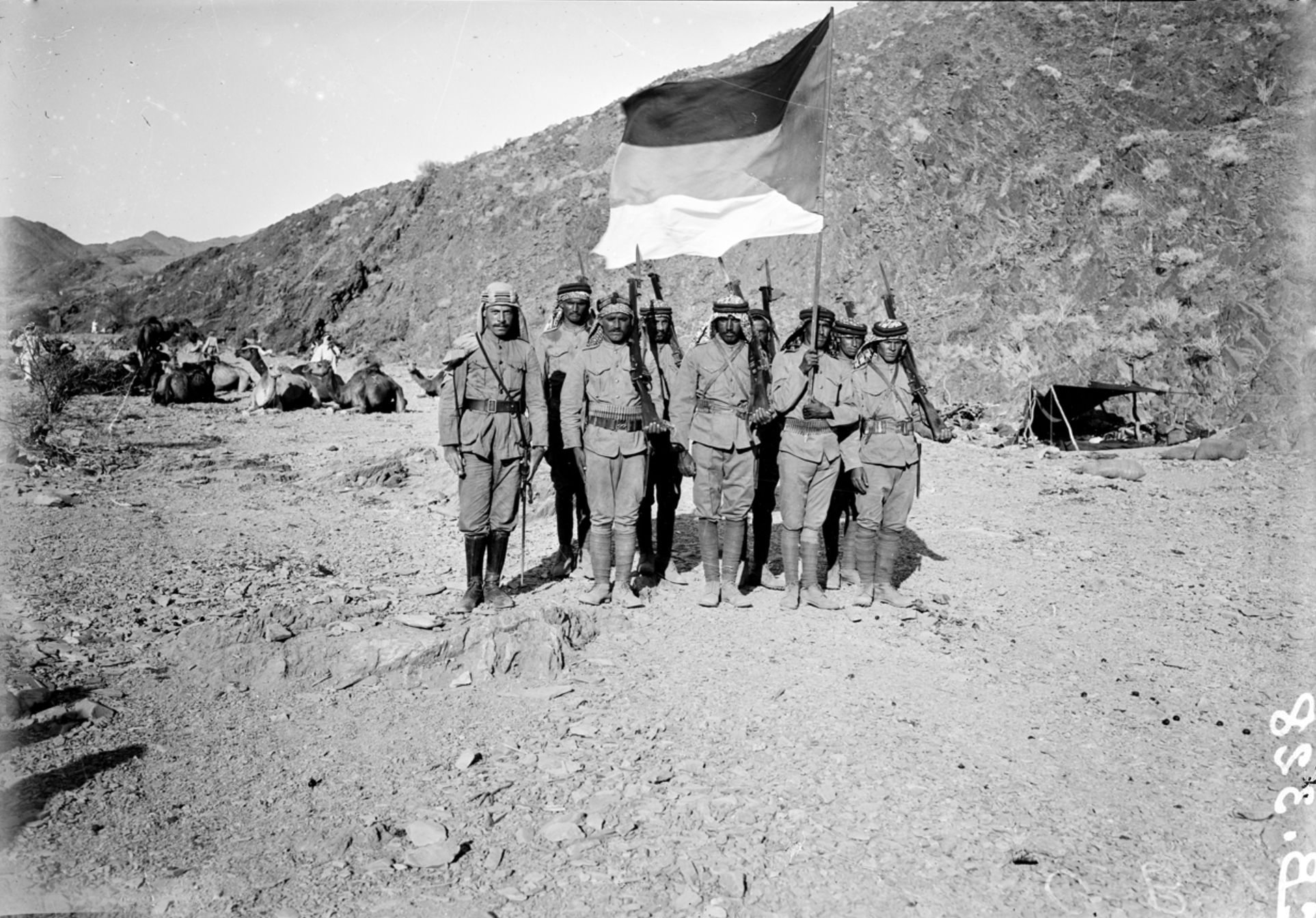
Soldiers in the Arab Army during the Arab Revolt of 1916–1918. They are carrying the flag of the Arab Revolt and are pictured in the Arabian Desert.

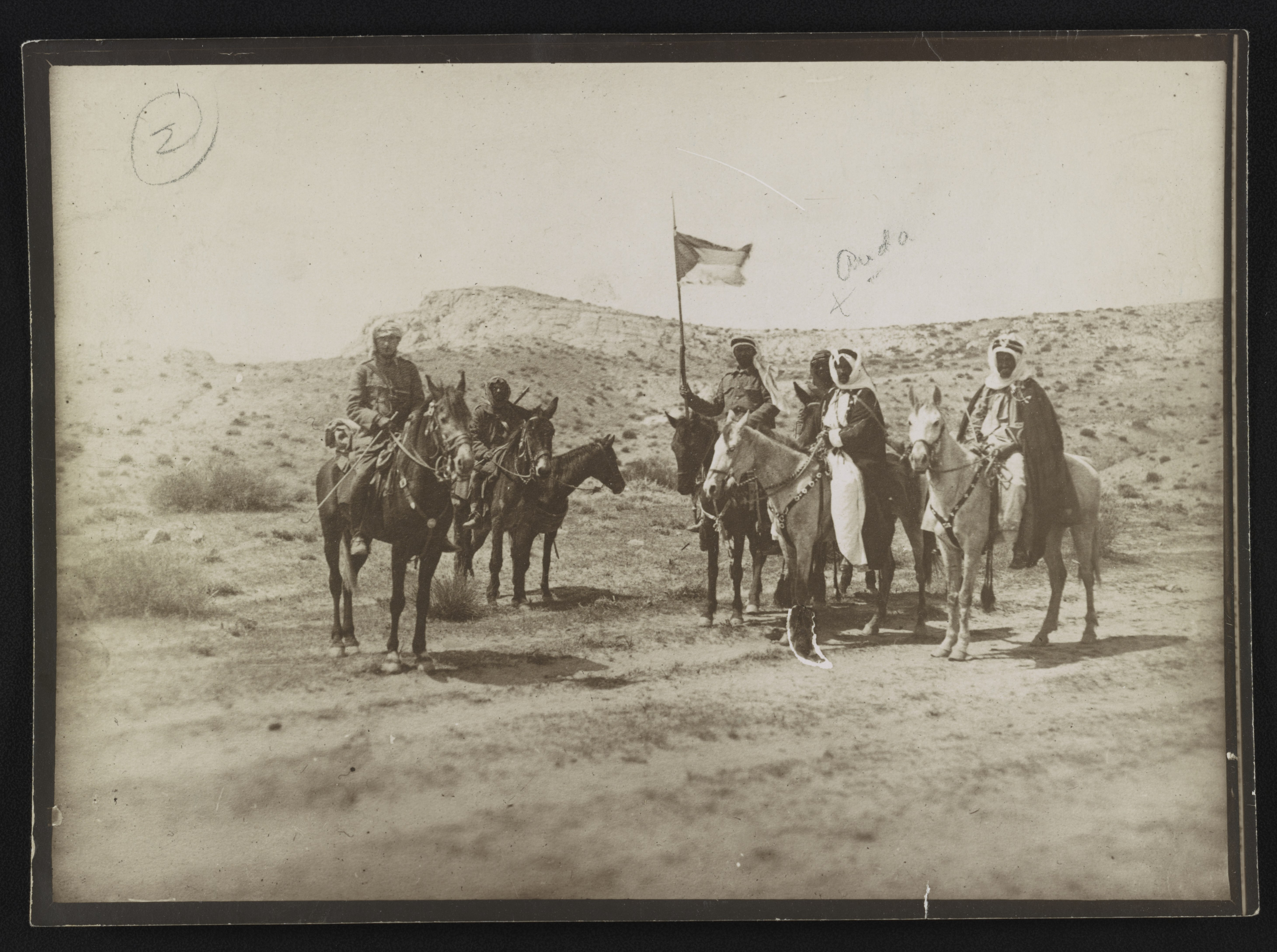
Auda Abu Tayi (marked with an X) of the Howeitat offers allegiance to the King; a soldier next to him bears the Arab flag. (1917)

The flag was designed by the British diplomat Mark Sykes. According to the historian Joshua Teitelbaum, this claim is made both by Sykes's 1923 biographer and by King Hussein bin Ali, who in 1918 told Woodrow Wilson that it symbolized Hashemite rule over the Arab world. According to one version, Sykes, keen to challenge the French flag being flown in French-controlled Arab territories, offered several designs to Hussein, who chose the one that was then used.

Although the Arab Revolt was limited in scope and supported by the British, the flag influenced the national flags of a number of emerging Arab states after World War I and World War II. Flags inspired by that of the Arab revolt include those of Palestine, Jordan, Kuwait, Sudan, Syria, the Sahrawi Arab Democratic Republic and Libya.

The Hashemites were allies of the British in the conflict against the Ottoman Empire. After the war ended, the Hashemites achieved or were granted rule in the Hejaz region of Arabia, Jordan, formally known as the Hashemite Kingdom of Jordan, Iraq, and briefly in Syria.

The Arab Kingdom of Syria was dissolved after only a few months of existence after the French conquest in 1920. The Hashemites were overthrown in the Hejaz in 1925 by the Sultanate of Najd after the Saudi conquest of Hejaz, and in Iraq in 1958 by a coup d'etat, but retained power in Jordan.

A 60 m × 30 m version of the flag currently flies from the Aqaba Flagpole, currently the seventh tallest freestanding flagpole in the world, located in Aqaba, Jordan.

== Gallery ==
=== Current national flags ===
Flag of Jordan since 1939

Flag of Palestine since 2006

Flag of Western Sahara since 1976

Flag of the United Arab Emirates since 1971

Flag of Kuwait since 1961

Flag of Syria since 2024

=== Historical flags ===
Flag of the Arab Revolt and Kingdom of Hejaz (1917–1920)

Flag of the Kingdom of Hejaz (1920–1926) and Emirate of Transjordan (1921–1928), and All-Palestine Protectorate (1948–1959)

Flag of the Arab Kingdom of Syria (1919–1920)

Mandatory Iraq (1921–1932) and Kingdom of Iraq (1932–1958)

Flag of the Emirate of Transjordan (1928–1939)

Flag of Syria (1932–1958, 1961–1963)

Flag of the Hashemite Arab Federation of Jordan and Iraq (1958)

Flag of Palestine (1964–2006)

Flag of the Ba'ath Party

Flag of the Arab revolt in Palestine (1936–1939)

Flag of Lower Yafa (?–1967)

=== Predecessors ===
Flag of Al-Muntada al-Adabi (1905–1915)

Flag of Al-Fatat (1909–1920)
