= Pan-Arab colors =

Color combination first used in the flag of the 1916 Arab Revolt

Flag of the Arab Revolt, associated with pan-Arabism.

The pan-Arab colors are black, white, green and red. Individually, each of the four pan-Arab colors were intended to represent a certain aspect of the Arab people and their history.

== History ==
Arab Liberation Flag, or Revolutionary flag (A modern revolutionary flag that spread to the Arab world inspired by the 1952 Egyptian revolution)

The four colors derive their potency from a verse by 14th century Arab poet Safi al-Din al-Hilli: "White are our acts, black our battles, green our fields, and red our swords". The black is the Black Standard, which was used by the Rashidun and Abbasid Caliphate, while white was the dynastic color of the Umayyad Caliphate. The color green has symbolic significance within Islam, the primary religion among Arabs, and is often specifically associated with the prophet Muhammad. Green is also identified as the color of the Fatimid Caliphate by some modern sources, despite their dynastic color having been white. Finally, red was used as the Hashemite dynastic color.

Pan-Arab colors, used individually in the past, were first combined in 1916 in the flag of the Arab Revolt or Flag of Hejaz. Many current flags are based on Arab Revolt colors, such as the flags of Jordan, Kuwait, Palestine, the Sahrawi Arab Democratic Republic, and the United Arab Emirates.

In the 1950s, a subset of the Pan-Arab colors, the Arab Liberation colors, came to prominence. These consist of a tricolor of red, white and black bands, with green given less prominence or not included. The Arab Liberation tricolor or the Arab Liberation Flag was mainly inspired by the Egyptian Revolution of 1952 and Egypt's official flag under president Mohamed Naguib, which became the basis of the current flags of Egypt, Iraq, Sudan, and Yemen (and formerly in the flags of Syria, the states of North Yemen and South Yemen), and in the short-lived Arab unions of the United Arab Republic and the Federation of Arab Republics.

== Flags with Pan-Arab colors ==
=== Current National flags ===
Egypt

Iraq

Jordan

Somaliland

Kuwait

Palestine

Sudan

Syria

United Arab Emirates

Yemen

Western Sahara

=== Flags of first-level administrative divisions ===
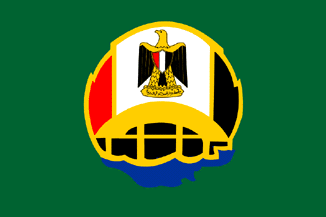
Faiyum Governorate, Egypt

=== Former national flags with the Pan-Arab colors ===
Hejaz (1917–20), OET Administration (1918–20), Palestine (All-Palestine Government, 1948–59)

Syria (8 March 1920 – 24 July 1920)

Hejaz (1920–26) and Kingdom of Hejaz and Nejd (1926–1932), Transjordan (1921–28)

Mandatory Iraq and the Kingdom of Iraq (1921–59)

Transjordan (1928–39)

Syria (1932–58 and 1961–63)

Egypt (1952–1958, flown alongside the national flag)

Arab Federation of Jordan and Iraq (14 February 1958 – 2 August 1958)

United Arab Republic (1958–61), Egypt (1961–72), Syria (1980–2024)

Iraq (1959–63)

North Yemen (1962–90)

Iraq (1963–91)

Syria (1963–72)

Palestine (1964–2006)

South Yemen (1967–90), used currently (2007 onwards) by the Southern Movement

Libya (1969–72)

Federation of Arab Republics
(Egypt (1972–84), Syria (1972–80), and Libya (1972–77))

Lower Yafa
(Yemen (1800–1967))

Arab Islamic Republic (proposed 1974, never implemented)

Iraq (1991–2004)

Iraq (2004–2008)

=== Flags of Arab political and paramilitary movements using Pan-Arab colors ===
Flag of Ottoman era Istanbul-based autonomist "Arab Literature Club" (1909–15), a precursor Arab flag

Flag of Ottoman era autonomist "Young Arab Society" (1911–16), a precursor Arab flag

Flag of the Arab movement used during the 1936–1939 Arab revolt

Flag of the Ba'ath Party (1947–present), also used by the National Democratic Front for the Liberation of Oman and the Arabian Gulf (active 1969–71)

Flag of the National Liberation Front of Yemen (1963–78), the Dhofar Liberation Front (1965–68), and the Popular Front for the Liberation of the Occupied Arabian Gulf (1968–74)

Flag of the Popular Front for the Liberation of Oman (1974–92)

Flag used by Arab separatists and autonomists in Khuzestan, Iran

Flag used by the separatist organizations the National Council of Ahwaz and the National Liberation Movement of Ahwaz in Khuzestan, Iran

Flag of the Arab Movement of Azawad (2012–present)

Flag of the Syrian Salvation Government
Red banner, attributed to the Banu Hashim

White banner, used by Umayyads (661–750) and the Fatimids (909–1171) and the Rashidun Caliphate

Black Standard used by the Abbasids (750–1258) and the Rashidun Caliphate

Green banner, associated with the Rashidun Caliphate

== See also ==
- Black Standard
- Islamic flags
- Green in Islam
- List of Arab flags
- Pan-African colors
- Pan-Arabism
- Pan-Slavic colors
- Tricolor
