= Flag of Palestine =

State of Palestine
- Use: National flag
- Proportion: 1:2
- Adopted: 28 May 1964; 62 years ago (PLO) 15 November 1988; 38 years ago (State of Palestine)
- Design: A horizontal tricolour of black, white, and green; with a red triangle based at the hoist.
- Use: Presidential standard
- Proportion: 1:2
- Design: A horizontal tricolour of black, white, and green; with a red triangle based at the hoist charged with the coat of arms above a golden wreath of laurel leaves in the fly end.
- Use: State flag
- Design: A horizontal tricolour of black, white, and green; with a red triangle based at the hoist charged with the coat of arms above two crossed white swords in the upper hoist corner.

The national flag of Palestine (Arabic: علم فلسطين, romanized: ʿalam Filasṭīn) is a tricolour of three equal horizontal stripes—black, white, and green from top to bottom—overlaid by a red triangle issuing from the hoist. It displays the pan-Arab colours, which were first combined in the current style during the 1916 Arab Revolt, and represents the Palestinian people and the State of Palestine.

Used since the 1920s, the Palestinian flag's overall design is almost identical to the flag of the Arab Revolt, with the pan-Arab colours representing four historical Arab dynasties. It was flown during the 1936–1939 Arab revolt in Palestine and has also been used extensively in the Israeli–Palestinian conflict, especially after it was officially adopted as the Palestinian people's flag when the Palestine Liberation Organization (PLO) was founded in 1964. Since 2015, the State of Palestine has observed a Flag Day every 30 September. Since 2021, the Palestinian flag has been lowered to half-mast every 2 November to lament the 1917 Balfour Declaration, which was issued by the United Kingdom, supporting a "national home for the Jewish people" in what was then Ottoman Palestine.

During the Six-Day War in 1967, Israel occupied the Gaza Strip and the West Bank, where it then outlawed the Palestinian flag, which remained until the early 1990s, when Israel and the PLO signed the Oslo Accords. In practice, however, the flag is still routinely confiscated by Israeli authorities throughout the Israeli-occupied territories. In 2023, Amnesty International released a report condemning new Israeli government restrictions on displays of the Palestinian flag as "an attempt to legitimize racism" by suppressing "a symbol of unity and resistance to Israel’s unlawful occupation" in the Palestinian territories. During the Gaza war, the watermelon symbol rose to prominence to defy Israeli restrictions on the Palestinian flag.

== Origin ==
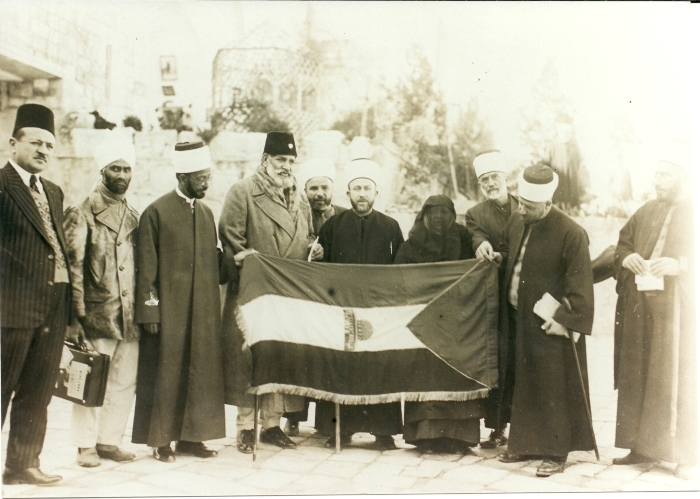
Indian independence activist Shaukat Ali receiving a Palestinian Arab flag (with the Dome of the Rock printed in the centre) from Amin al-Husseini and other Palestinian Arab nationalists in Jerusalem, Mandatory Palestine, 1931

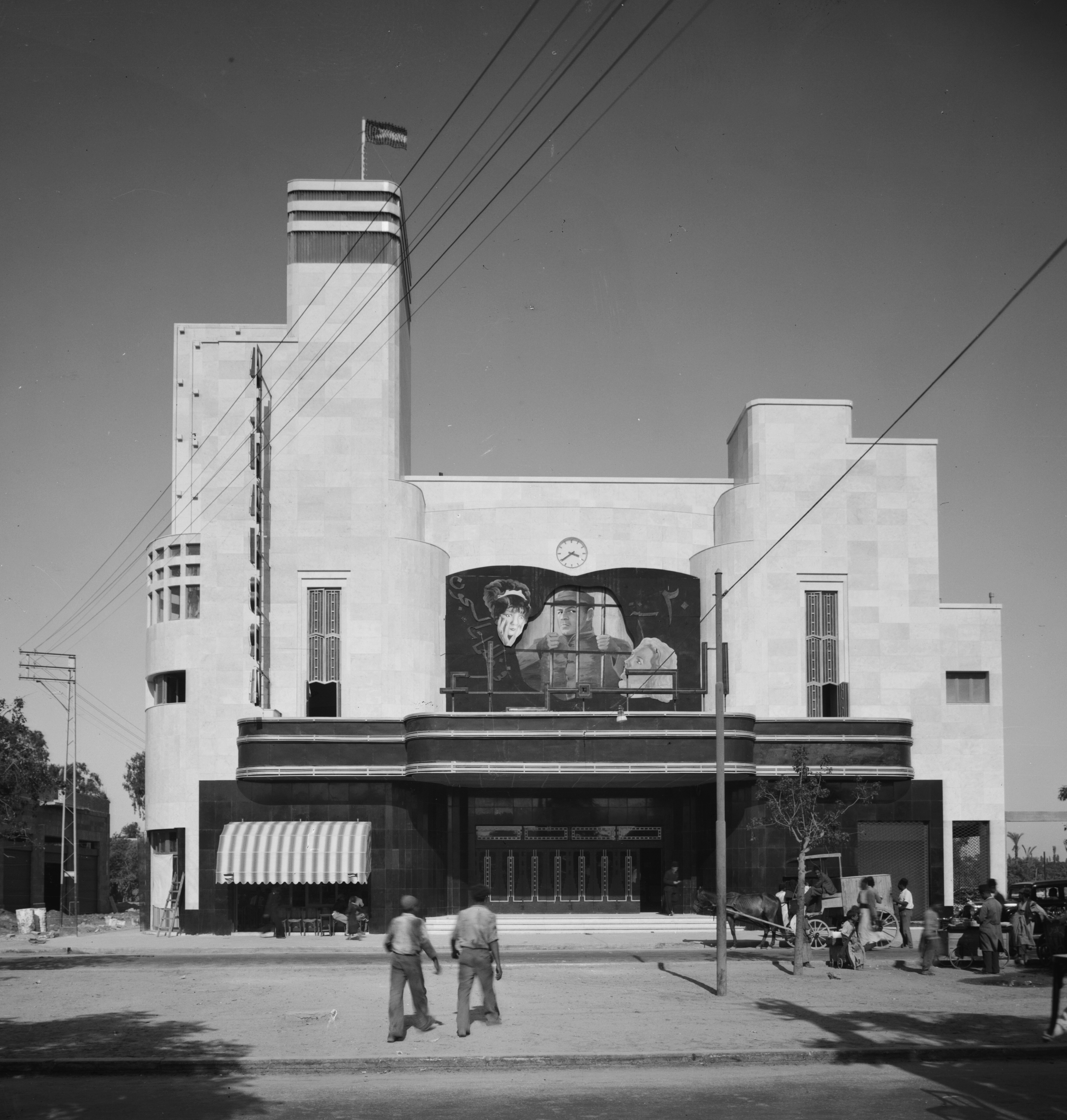
Palestinian Arab flag flying atop the Alhambra Cinema in Jaffa, Mandatory Palestine, 1937

The flag used by the Arab Palestinian nationalists in the first half of the 20th century is the flag of the 1916 Arab Revolt. The origins of the flag are the subject of dispute and mythology. In one version, the colours were chosen by the Arab nationalist 'Literary Club' in Istanbul in 1909, based on the words of the 13th-century Arab poet Safi al-Din al-Hili:

Ask the high rising spears, of our aspirations
Bring witness the swords, did we lose hope
We are a band, honor halts our souls
Of beginning with harm, those who won't harm us
White are our deeds, black are our battles,
Green are our fields, red are our swords.

Another version credits the Young Arab Society, which was formed in Paris in 1911. Yet another version is that the flag was designed by Sir Mark Sykes of the British Foreign Office. Whatever the correct story, the flag was used by Sharif Hussein by 1917 at the latest and quickly became regarded as the flag of the Arab national movement in the Mashriq.

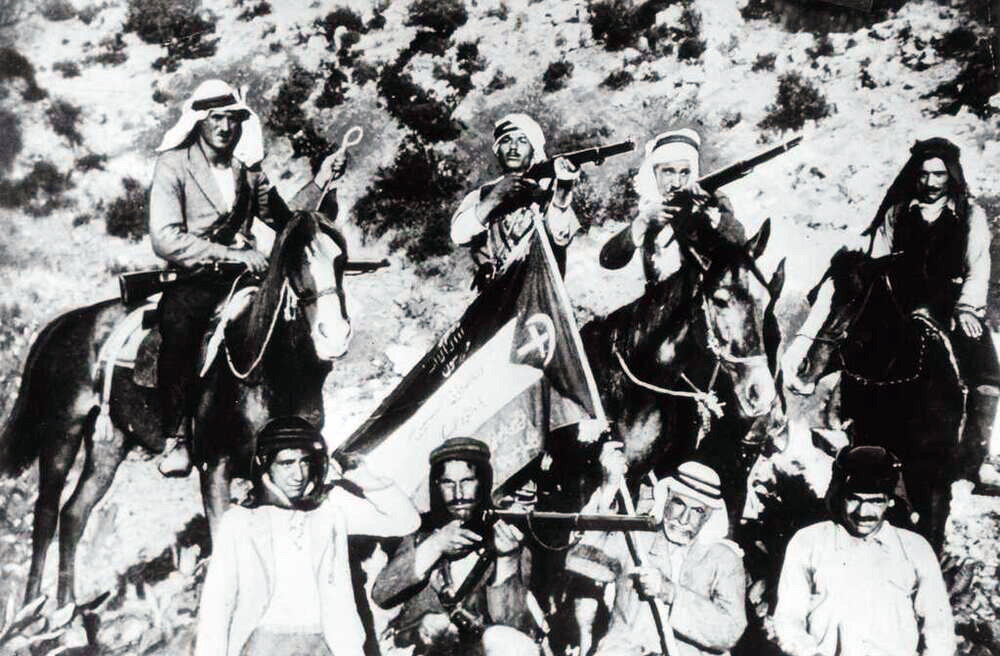
Rebels posing with their rifles and a Palestinian Arab flag emblazoned with a Christian cross and an Islamic crescent during the Arab revolt in Palestine, 1937

A modified version (changing the order of stripes) has been used in Palestine at least since the early 1920s The Palestinian flag featured during the 1936–1939 Arab revolt in Palestine, being held in most villages and the rural areas which were declared as "liberated zones". On 18 October 1948, the flag of the Arab Revolt was adopted by the All-Palestine Government, and was recognised subsequently by the Arab League as the flag of Palestine. The flag was officially adopted as the flag of the Palestinian people by the Palestine Liberation Organization (PLO) in 1964. On 1 December of the same year, the Executive Committee of the Liberation Organization established a special system for the flag specifying its standards and dimensions, and the black and green colors replaced each other. On 15 November 1988, the PLO adopted the flag as the flag of the State of Palestine.

On the ground the flag became widely used since the Oslo Agreements, with the establishment of the Palestinian Authority in 1993. Today the flag is flown widely by Palestinians and their supporters.

== Design ==
=== Specifications ===
flag construction sheet

=== Colour scheme ===
(Palestine) Colour scheme	Red	Black	White	Green
CMYK	0-82-77-6	100-100-100-99	0-0-0-0	100-0-64-40
HEX	#EE2A35	#000000	#FFFFFF	#009736
RGB	238-42-53	0-0-0	255-255-255	0-151-54

==== Interpretation ====
Scheme	Textile colour
Red	The Hashemite dynasty, symbolizes the blood on the swords of the warriors.
White	The Umayyad dynasty, symbolizes purity and noble deeds.
Green	The Fatimid dynasty, represents the fertile Arab lands.
Black	The Abbasid dynasty, represents the defeat of enemies in battle.

== Suppression by Israel ==
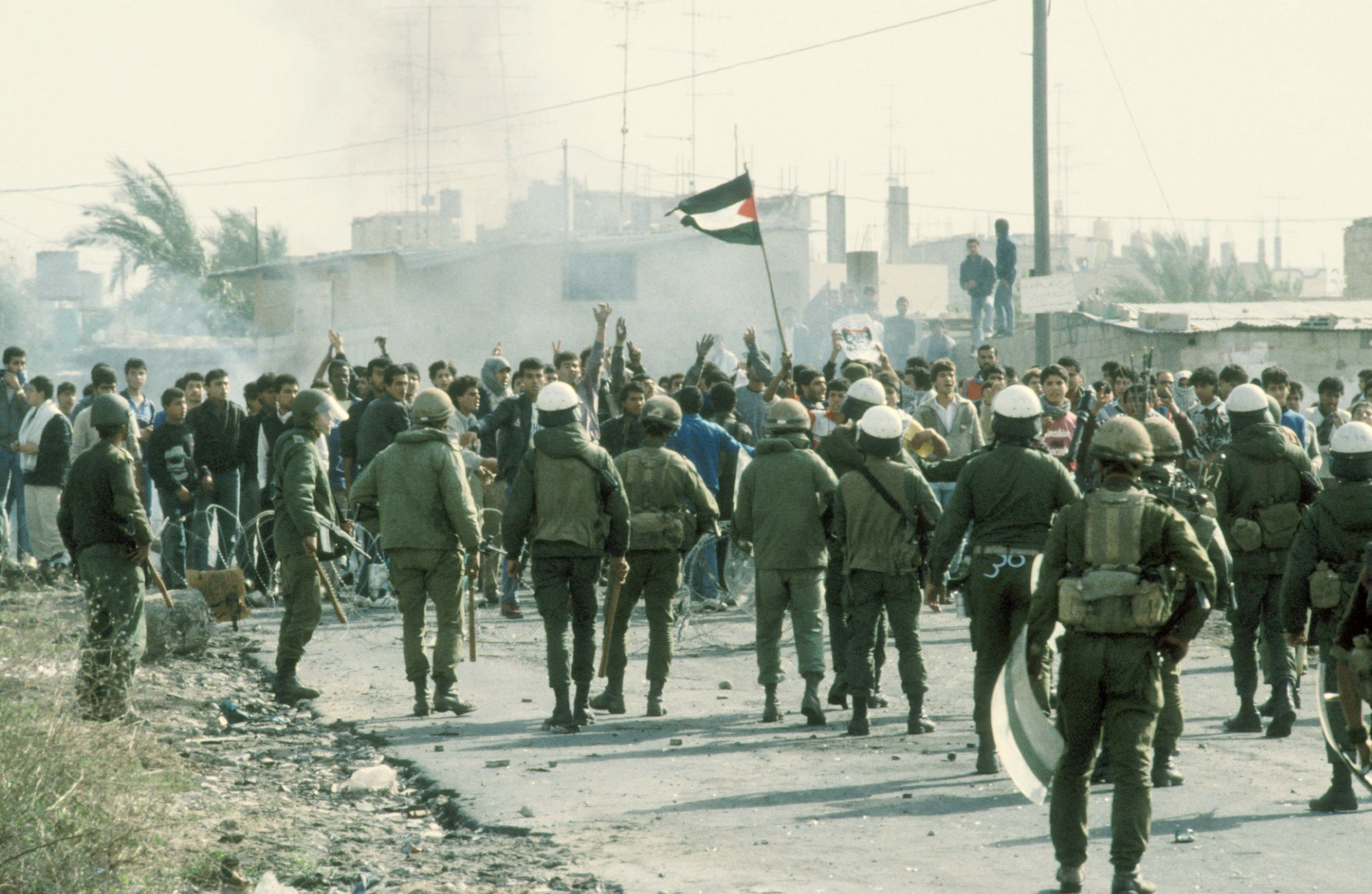
Confrontation between Israeli troops and Palestinians in Gaza City during the First Intifada, 1987

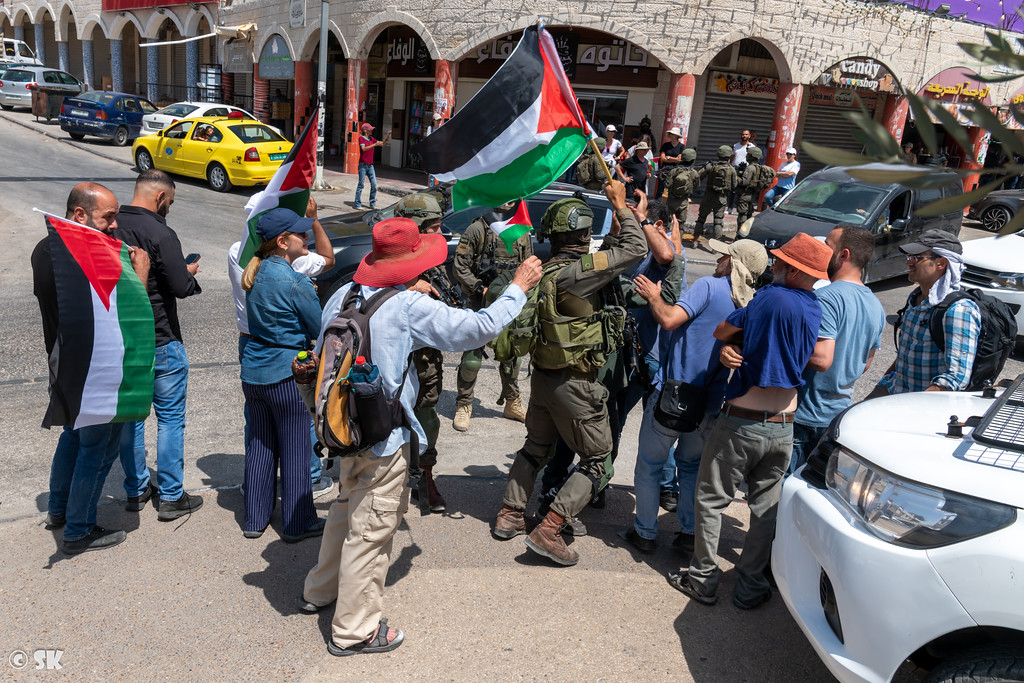
Israeli soldiers confiscating Palestinian flags in Huwara, 2022

Israeli police officers confiscating Palestinian flags in Sheikh Jarrah, 2023

Under Israeli law, flying the Palestinian flag is not a crime. By law, the flag is not allowed to be displayed when it is "used in support of terrorism or disrupts public order". Since 2014 Israeli police have been given the authority to confiscate a flag when used in a manner that violates the law. As of 2022, Israeli police has been routinely confiscating flags. In January 2023, Minister of National Security Itamar Ben-Gvir announced he had instructed the police to ban the flag's showcasing in public spaces. Israel's restriction on the Palestinian flag were criticized by Amnesty International as an attempt to legitimize racism, adding that the Palestinian flag has been used for the past decades as "a symbol of unity and resistance to Israel’s unlawful occupation". The use of the watermelon as a Palestinian symbol has come as a response to Israel's confiscation of Palestinian flags.

An unconfirmed report was published by The New York Times about Palestinians being arrested for holding slices of watermelon, since the slices bear the same colors as the Palestinian flag. Palestinian artist Sliman Mansour has cast doubt on the validity of these claims. A later editor's note to the article says "Given the ambiguity of the situation, the Times should either have omitted the anecdote or made it clear that the report was unconfirmed."

== Social media ==
The Palestine flag emoji (🇵🇸) (usually referred to officially as flag of the Palestinian territories (Note: Especially in American and other Western sources)) was approved in 2015. The use of the watermelon as a Palestinian symbol has become common in social media in the 2020s.

== Other pan-Arab flags ==
The flag is similar to that of Syria's Ba'ath Party, which uses the same shapes and colours but a 2:3 ratio as opposed to Palestine's 1:2, as well as the short-lived Arab Federation of Iraq and Jordan (which had an equilateral triangle at the hoist). It is also similar to the Flag of Sudan, the Flag of Jordan, and to the Flag of Western Sahara, all of which draw their inspiration from the Great Arab Revolt against Ottoman rule (1916–1918). The flag of the Arab Revolt had the same graphic form, but the colours were arranged differently (white on the bottom, rather than in the middle).

=== Variations ===
Flag used in 1931 by Palestinian nationalists

Flag used during the 1936–1939 Arab revolt in Palestine, displaying a Christian cross and an Islamic crescent in the red triangle

Placeholder flag used by the Arab League to represent the Palestinian people from 1945 to c. 1955

Flag used by the All-Palestine Government in the Egyptian-occupied Gaza Strip, based on the flag of the Arab Revolt, but with the modified order of colours that it received in 1920

Palestinian flag from 1948 to 1964. Today it is flown whenever there is a sign of distress or just by mistake.

Version with the shorter red triangle, used by the Palestine Liberation Organization (founded in 1964) until the 1980s

Version with the longer red triangle, used in some periods of Palestinian history, though not widespread

Palestinian flag with darker colours, used frequently

== See also ==
- List of Arab flags
  - Flag of the Arab Revolt
  - Flag of the Arab Federation
- Pan-Arab colours
  - Watermelon as a Palestinian symbol
  - Green in Islam
- List of Palestinian flags
  - Flag of Mandatory Palestine
