= Black Standard =

Flag flown by Muhammad in Islamic tradition

The Black Standard
- One of the depictions of the Black Standard
- Rayat al-'Uqab (Banner of the Eagle)
- Adopted: c. 628 CE (First Islamic State)
- Design: Solid black with a white Shahadah.

The Black Banner or Black Standard (Arabic: الراية السوداء, romanized: ar-rāyat as-sawdāʾ), also known as the Banner of the Eagle (Arabic: راية العقاب, romanized: rāyat al-ʿuqāb) or simply as The Banner (Arabic: الراية, romanized: ar-rāyah) is one of the Islamic flags flown by the Islamic prophet Muhammad according to Muslim tradition. It was historically used by Abu Muslim in his uprising leading to the Abbasid Revolution in 747 and is therefore associated with the Abbasid Caliphate in particular. It is also a symbol in Islamic eschatology (heralding the advent of the Mahdi), though this tradition is weak according to hadithic standards.

== Origin ==
Arab armies in the 7th century used standards to identify themselves on the field of battle. Among these standards, the rāya was a square banner; not to be confused with the liwāʾ or ʿalam, an identifying mark like a red turban.

Islamic tradition states that the Quraysh had a black liwāʾ and a white-and-black rāya. It further states that Muhammad had an ʿalam in white nicknamed "the Young Eagle" (العقاب, al-ʿuqāb); and a rāya in black, said to be made from his wife Aisha's head-cloth. This larger flag was known as the Eagle.

At the Battle of Siffin, according to tradition, Ali used the liwāʾ of the Prophet, which was white while those who fought against him instead used black banners.

== Historical use ==
The Abbasid Revolution against the Umayyad Caliphate adopted black for its rāyaʾ for which their partisans were called the musawwids. Their rivals chose other colours in reaction; among these, forces loyal to Marwan II adopted red. The choice of black as the colour of the Abbasid Revolution was already motivated by the "black standards out of Khorasan" tradition associated with the Mahdi. The contrast of white vs. black as the Fatimid vs. Abbasid dynastic colour over time developed in white as the colour of Shia Islam and black as the colour of Sunni Islam. After the revolution, Islamic apocalyptic circles admitted that the Abbasid banners would be black but asserted that the Mahdi's standard would be black and larger. Anti-Abbasid circles cursed "the black banners from the East", "first and last".

The flag was also used by Sultan Selim I of the Ottoman Empire during his conquest of Egypt in 1517 and continued to be used by Ottoman rulers in battle.

A black flag was used by the Hotak dynasty in the early 18th century, following Mirwais Hotak's Sunni rebellion against the Twelver Shi'i Safavid dynasty and later by the Emirate of Afghanistan under Abdur Rahman Khan (1880–1901).

On 21 July 1848, under orders from the Báb, the Bábí leader Mullá Husayn raised the Black Standard in Mashhad (in Iran's Khorasan Province) and began a march westwards. The mission was most likely proclamatory but possibly also to rescue another Bábí leader, Quddús, who was under house arrest in Sárí. After being rebuffed at the town of Barfurush, the group took up making defensive fortifications at the Shrine of Shaykh Tabarsi. It is reported the Black Standard flew above the Bábí fortress until the end of the Battle of Fort Tabarsi. According to Denis MacEoin, the Bábís were on their mission of spreading Babism, "by preaching if possible, by force if necessary."

As Arab nationalism developed in the early 20th century, the black within the Pan-Arab colors was chosen to represent the Abbasid dynastic color.

The Ahmadiyya movement also employs black and white colours in its flag (Liwaa-i Ahmadiyya), first hoisted in 1939. Mirza Tahir Ahmad, the fourth caliph of the Ahmadiyya Caliphate, explained the symbolism of the colours black and white in terms of the concept of revelation and prophethood.

== Modern use ==
The Black Banner, which is distinct from the ISIS flag, has been used by some militant groups since the 1990s, including some Chechen groups. Scholars have interpreted IS's use of a similar black flag as representing their claim to re-establishing a caliphate. Similar black flags have been used throughout Islamic history, including in Afghanistan during the early 20th century.

== See also ==
- Black Banner Organization
- Christian Flag
- Islamic flag
- Jihadist flag
- List of black flags
- Tawhid
- Black Flag of Anarchism
