= Al-Muntada al-Adabi =

Arab culture organization

The Literary Club
- المنتدى الأدبي
- Founded: 1905
- Founders: Abdul Karim al-Khalil
- Dissolved: 1915

Al-Muntada al-Adabi (Arabic: المنتدى الأدبي, The Literary Club), was an Arab organisation set up in 1905 to promote Arabic culture in the Ottoman Empire. While officially apolitical, the organisation acted as an incubator for the growing Arab nationalist movement.

== Foundation ==
The organization was founded in 1905 mainly by Abdul Karim al-Khalil, a Shiite from Chyah (present-day Lebanon) who acted as the head of the organisation. Initially, since it had no political agenda it was accepted by the CUP authorities. It was an immediate success, swiftly reaching a membership of several thousand, mostly students, with branches in Syria and Iraq.

== History ==
The 1908 Committee of Union and Progress, Young Turk, revolution promised to implement political reforms and the establishment of a constitutional government across the Ottoman Empire. The revolution was greeted with approval across the Arab world amongst those who hoped for more recognition of the Arabic language and Arabic culture. In practice the new regime sought to increase central control from Constantinople and to impose Ottoman Turkish as the language of government across the empire.

Following the outbreak of the First World War the organisation came under suspicion of involvement in anti-Ottoman activities. In 1915, al-Khalil and three other members of the Beirut branch were hanged for treason, a day commemorated in Lebanon and Syria as Martyrs' Day.
