= Flag of Kuwait =

State of Kuwait
- Alam Baladii, Derti
- Use: Civil and state flag, national ensign
- Proportion: 1:2
- Adopted: 7 September 1961; 65 years ago Officially hoisted 24 November 1961
- Design: A horizontal triband of green, white and red; with a black trapezium based on the hoist side.

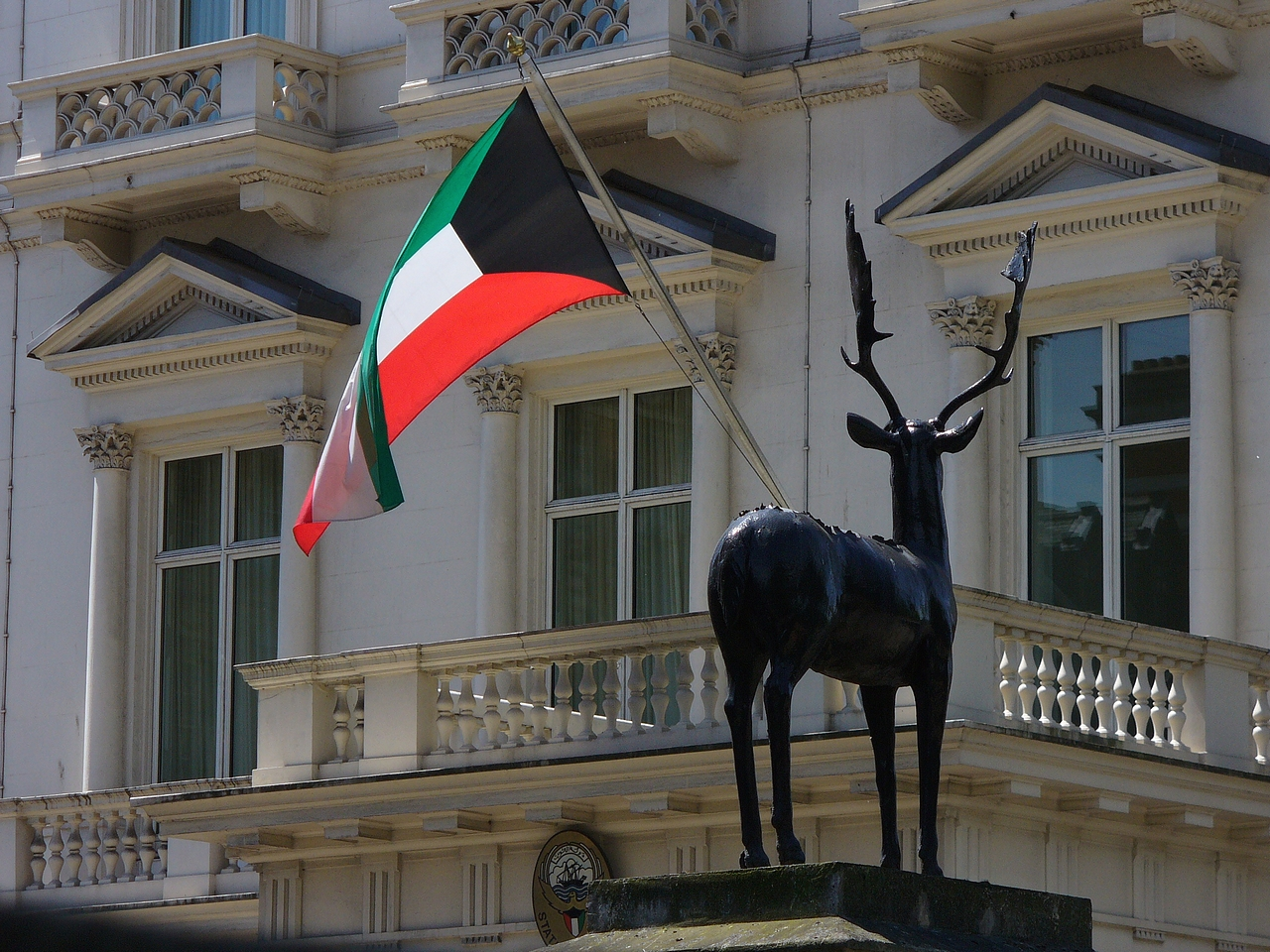
Flag at the Embassy of Kuwait, London

The flag of Kuwait (Arabic: علم الكويت) was adopted on 7 September 1961, and officially hoisted 24 November 1961. Before 1961, the flag of Kuwait was red and white, like those of other Arab states of the Persian Gulf at the time, with the field being red and words or charges being written in white. It is the only national flag featuring an acute trapezium.

When the Utub settled in Kuwait, Kuwaiti ships were flying a flag common on the western coast of the Persian Gulf, a red flag with a serrated white ribbon added near the mast, similar to the current Bahrain flag, and was called the Sulaimi flag. This flag was raised in the rule of Sheikh Sabah I bin Jaber in 1752 and was used to 1871.

During the period of Ottoman rule in Kuwait, the Ottoman flag, red with a white crescent and star, was used. This flag was retained after the country became a British protectorate in the Anglo-Kuwaiti Agreement of 1899.

In 1903, Lord Curzon, the British Viceroy and Governor-General of India visited Kuwait, and Sheikh Mubarak Al-Sabah received him and raised a red flag with white words, توكلنا على الله (We trust in God) in Arabic writing. This avoided the diplomatic faux pas, given Kuwait was under British protection, of raising the Ottoman flag.

Two different flag designs were proposed but not adopted in the period after this. The first proposal in 1906, a red flag with white Western letters spelling (KOWEIT) and the second in 1913, the Ottoman flag but the word كويت (Kuwayt) in Arabic writing as a canton.

The Ottoman flag kept being used until the First World War, when friendly-fire incidents with the British in 1914 during the Mesopotamian campaign around the river Shatt al-Arab occurred due to Kuwait and the enemy Ottomans both using the same flag. Because of this Kuwait adopted a new flag, red with كويت (Kuwait) in Arabic writing. This flag was in use until 1921, when Sheikh Ahmad Al-Jaber Al-Sabah added the Shahada to the flag. This version was in use until 1940, when he also added a stylized falcon's claw to the flag. These flags were also depicted on the Emblems of Kuwait. The red flag remained the national flag of Kuwait until the adoption of the current one in September 1961. The present flag is in the Pan-Arab colours, but each colour is also significant in its own right.

During the 1990 Iraqi invasion of Kuwait, the Kuwaiti flag was temporarily banned and replaced with Iraqi symbols, underscoring its role as a symbol of national identity and resistance.

Scheme	Textile colour
Red	The Hashemite dynasty, symbolizes the blood on the swords of Muslim warriors.
White	The Umayyad dynasty, symbolizes purity and noble deeds.
Green	The Fatimid dynasty or Rashidun Caliphate, represents the fertile land of Arabia.
Black	The Abbasid dynasty, represents the defeat of enemies in battle.

The colours' meaning came from a poem by Safi al-Din al-Hilli:

- White are our deeds
- Black are our battles
- Green are our lands
- Red are our swords

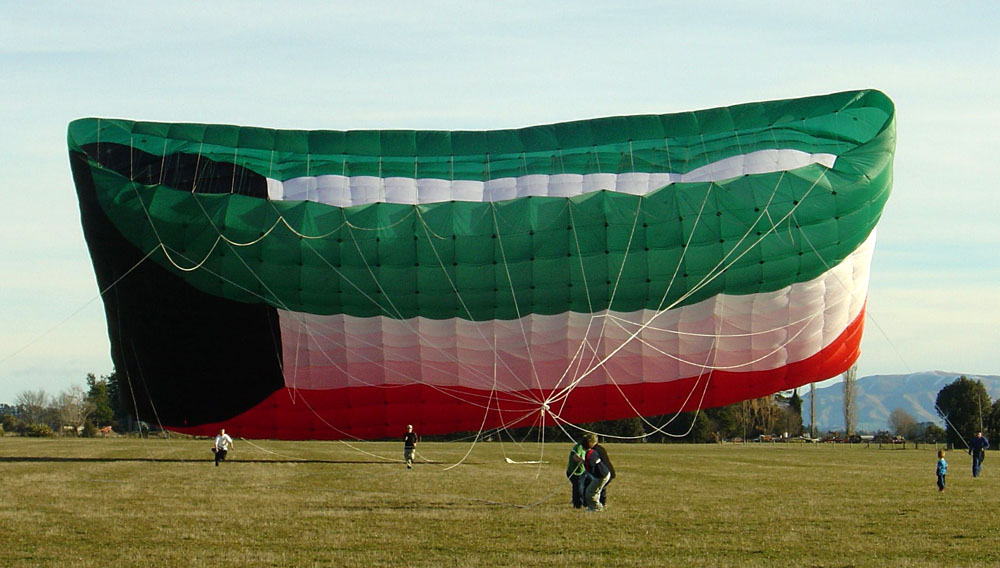
Peter Lynn's Kuwaiti flag kite

In 2005, it became the design of the world's largest kite at a size of 1019 square metres. It was made in New Zealand by Peter Lynn, launched to the public for the first time in 2004 in the United Kingdom, officially launched in Kuwait in 2005, and has not been surpassed since.

== Suppression by Ba'athist Iraq ==
During the Iraqi invasion of Kuwait in August 1990, the Iraqi government under Saddam Hussein sought to suppress Kuwaiti national symbols after declaring Kuwait Iraq’s "19th province". The Kuwaiti flag was banned during the occupation, and Iraqi authorities replaced it with Iraqi symbols on public buildings, government facilities, and other official locations as part of efforts to integrate Kuwait into Iraq. Kuwaitis who displayed the national flag or participated in symbolic acts of resistance risked arrest, torture, or other severe punishment by the occupying authorities. According to reports presented to international bodies following the occupation, civilians were punished for acts such as "raising the Kuwaiti flag", writing national slogans, distributing opposition leaflets, or participating in peaceful demonstrations against the occupation. These reports described how such symbolic expressions of Kuwaiti national identity were treated by Iraqi authorities as acts of resistance, and individuals suspected of these activities were detained and subjected to interrogation or mistreatment during the period of Iraqi control.

== Rules and Protocol for Displaying the Kuwaiti Flag ==
The Law No. 26 of 1961 formally defines the national flag’s design, proportions, and where it may be hoisted, such as government buildings, embassies, private buildings on national occasions. The flag’s length must be twice its width, divided into three horizontal bands with a black trapezium at the hoist.

In addition to these legal definitions, official etiquette and regulations require respectful handling and display of the flag:

=== Orientation ===
- Horizontally: The green stripe must be on top, followed by white and red, with the black trapezium at the hoist.
- Vertically: The black trapezium must be nearest the flagpole, with the stripes properly aligned and colors preserved in order.

=== Respectful Handling ===
- The flag must be clean, intact, and undamaged.
- It should be raised quickly and lowered slowly.
- The flag should never touch the ground, be used as clothing or decoration in a disrespectful manner, or be altered with writing, symbols, or drawings.

=== Proper Use and Occasions ===
- It may only be flown on private buildings during official feasts and ceremonies and must not be used continuously or for commercial or advertising purposes.

=== Penalties for Misuse ===
Violations of flag regulations such as displaying a damaged flag, improper hoisting, or unauthorized use may carry fines, imprisonment, or other legal penalties. Recent updates, including Decree‑Law No. 73 of 2025, have further strengthened restrictions to protect the flag’s dignity and national symbolism.

== Construction sheet ==
Flag construction sheet

== Standard of the Emir ==
The current Emir of Kuwait has a personal royal standard, which is the national flag with a yellow crown on the green stripe.

Standard of the Emir 1921–1940

Standard of the Emir 1940–1956

Standard of the Emir 1956–1961

Standard of the Emir 1961–present

== Historical flags of Kuwait ==
1746–1871
(Al-Sulami flag)

1871–1914
(The Ottoman Empire adopted its flag in 1844)

1899–1961 (Emirate of Kuwait under protectorate of the United Kingdom)

Used between 28–30 November 1903 during the visit of Lord Curzon

1906 proposal
(not adopted)

1913 proposal
(not adopted)

1914–1921

Battle flag raised during Battle of Jahra in 1920

1921–1940

1940–1961

Maritime Ensign
1956–1961
Only used at sea

Flag used during the Iraqi occupation of Kuwait (1990)

1961–present

== See also ==
- List of Arab flags
