= Flag of Jordan =

Hashemite Kingdom of Jordan
- Use: Civil and state flag, civil and state ensign
- Proportion: 1:2
- Adopted: 16 April 1928; 98 years ago
- Design: A horizontal triband of black, white and green; with a red triangle based on the hoist side containing a white seven-pointed star
- Use: Royal standard of the King
- Design: Pan-Arab colors resembles the Rising Sun Flag; Jordanian flag in the center, with the star being replaced with a gold crown
- Use: Royal standard of the Crown Prince
- Use: The Hashemite Standard, The Banner of Ashrāf of Hijaz(The Nobles), the House of The Hashemites

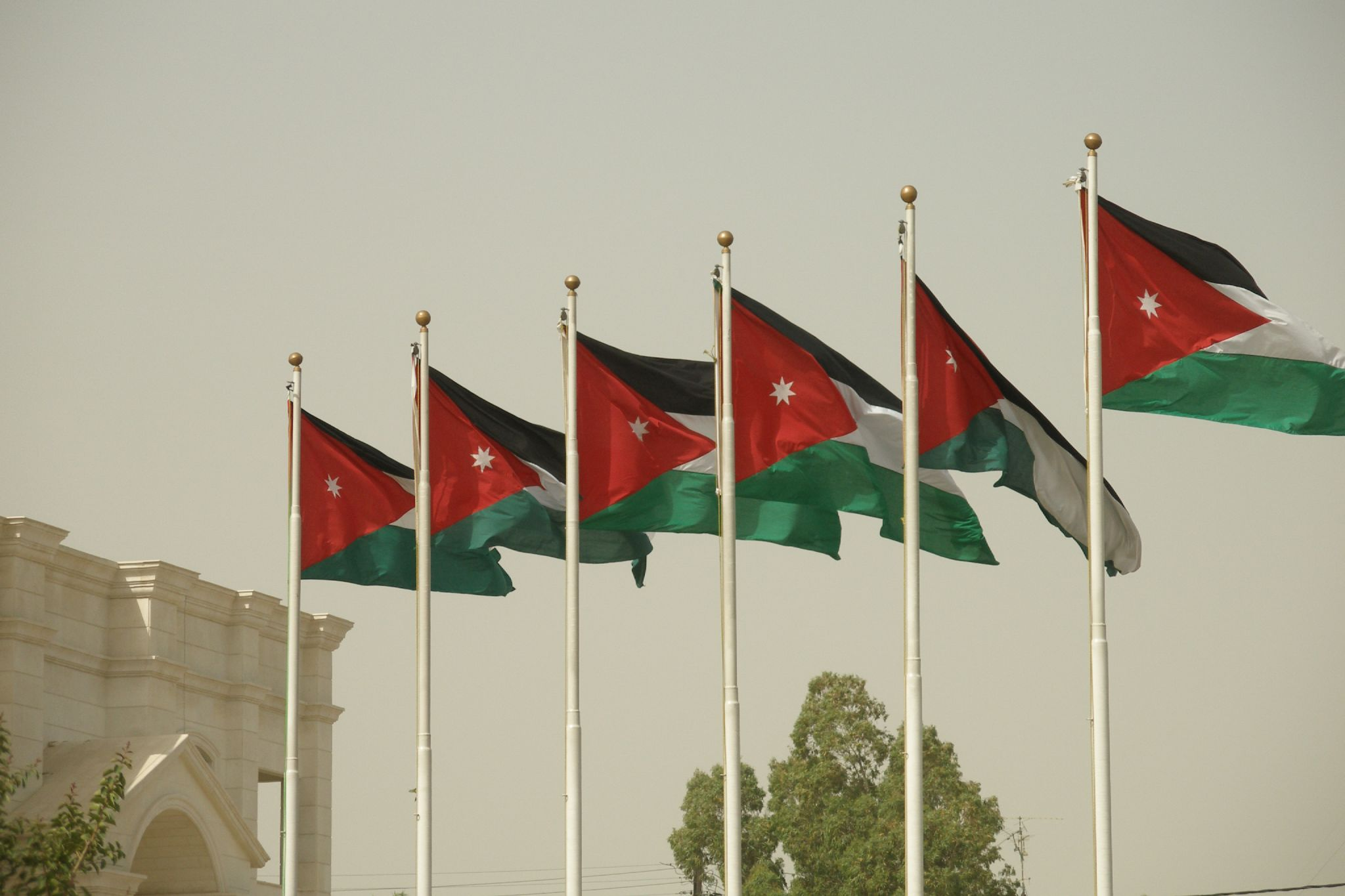
Flags of Jordan in Amman

The national flag of Jordan, officially adopted on 16 April 1928, is based on the 1916 flag of the Arab Revolt against the Ottoman Empire during World War I. The flag consists of horizontal black, white, and green bands, with a red isoceles triangle based at the hoist. The colors are the pan-Arab colors, representing the Abbasid (black band), Umayyad (white band), and Fatimid or Rashidun caliphates (green band). The red triangle represents the Hashemite dynasty, and the Arab Revolt.

== Features ==
In addition to the bands and triangle, a white star with seven points is centered in the red triangle. The star stands for the unity of the Arab people; its seven points refer to the seven verses of Al-Fatiha

=== Interpretation of the colors ===
Scheme	Textile colour
Red	The Hashemite dynasty, bloody struggle for freedom
White	The Umayyad Caliphate, bright and peaceful future
Green	The Fatimid Caliphate or Rashidun Caliphate
Black	The Abbasid Caliphate

=== Construction sheet ===
Flag construction sheet

Notice that, given the proportions of height and width of the red triangle, its sides are coincident with the diagonals of the flag.

== Historical flags ==
Flag under Arab administration (1918–1921)

Flag of the Arab Kingdom of Syria (1920)

Flag of the Emirate of Transjordan (1922–1939)

Flag of the Hashemite Arab Federation (1958)

== Military flags ==
Flag of the Royal Jordanian Army

Ensign of the Royal Jordanian Navy

Ensign of the Royal Jordanian Air Force

== Other state organisation flags ==
Flag of the Royal Jordanian Civil Defence

Flag of the Public Security Directorate

== See also ==
- Flag of the Arab Revolt
- Flag of Palestine, same design but without the star
- Kingdom of Hejaz
