= Plum Sykes =

British fashion writer

- Born: Victoria Sykes; 4 December 1969 (age 56); London, England
- Education: Ide Hill Church of England Primary School; Walthamstow Hall
- Alma mater: Worcester College, Oxford
- Occupations: Writer, novelist, socialite
- Years active: 1993–present
- Spouse: Toby Rowland (m. 2005)
- Children: 2
- Relatives: Lucy Sykes (sister); Christopher Sykes (grandfather); Sir Mark Sykes (great-grandfather); Tiny Rowland (father-in-law)

Victoria Rowland (née Sykes; born 4 December 1969), known as Plum Sykes, is an English fashion journalist and novelist.

== Early years and antecedents ==
Victoria Sykes was born in London, one of six children including a twin sister, Lucy, and grew up in Sevenoaks, Kent. She was nicknamed 'Plum' (the Victoria plum being a variety of that fruit) as a child. Sykes has described herself as a "painfully shy" child with mousey brown hair and goofy teeth. She went to Ide Hill Church of England Primary School and later to a private secondary school, Walthamstow Hall, where she was unhappy, and subsequently to Sevenoaks School, an independent boys' school that had begun admitting girls to the sixth form. In 1988 she went up to Worcester College, Oxford, where she graduated in modern history. She has published a short memoir of her unsettling first term at university (Oxford Girl, 2011).

Sykes' mother Valerie Goad, a dress designer, separated from Sykes' father Mark while Plum was at Oxford. The effects of this left her impecunious for a while and she received assistance from Worcester to remain at the college. Sykes' grandfather, Christopher Sykes (1907–1986), whom she knew as "Fat Grandpa" or "F.G.", was a friend and official biographer (1975) of the novelist Evelyn Waugh and son of the diplomat Sir Mark Sykes, sixth baronet (1879–1919), associated with the Sykes–Picot Agreement of 1916, by which Britain and France provided for the partition of the Ottoman Empire after the end of the First World War. An 18th century forebear, the second baronet, Sir Christopher Sykes (1749–1801), was a major figure in the enclosure movement that transformed the agricultural landscape in the 18th century.

== Career ==
=== Vogue ===
In 1993, Sykes became a fashion assistant at British Vogue. She was featured that year, with, among others, designer Bella Freud and model Stella Tennant in Babes in London, in a photographic shoot by the American Steven Meisel (responsible in 1992 for the singer Madonna's controversial collection, Sex), which was produced by the rising fashion guru Isabella Blow (1958–2007). Blow also recruited her to model in the early Alexander McQueen show Banshee (Autumn/Winter 1994).

In 1997, Sykes became a contributing editor on fashion for American Vogue, of which Anna Wintour, also British, had been editor-in-chief since 1988. Sykes soon became a familiar figure on the New York social scene, being frequently described as an "It girl".

A decade later, at 38, Sykes reflected that "when you hit 30 you lose your edge": invited by the Times to comment on the late-1990s trend for ultra-high heeled shoes, she observed that "these weird space-age shoes look cool and trendy and are a way of getting back to some degree", but that "this type of trend is not a classic version of beauty. Men want women to be sexy. They'd be happy if we were all [the model] Gisele Bündchen, but that's just not fashion".

== Personal life ==
In 2005, Sykes married British entrepreneur Toby Rowland, son of businessman "Tiny" Rowland and co-creator of King, at Sledmere House, her family's ancestral home (1751) in the East Riding of Yorkshire. Her dress was designed by Sykes' friend and protégé of Isabella Blow, Alexander McQueen. Sykes was sometimes described as a muse of McQueen; she modelled for some of his earliest catwalk shows, as well as for photoshoots of his designs. Before her wedding, she wrote an article for Vogue about shopping for suitable lingerie for her wedding night, an article entitled "The $900 bra".

Sykes' twin sister Lucy, who moved to New York in 1996, became fashion director of Marie Claire and later a designer of children's clothes. In the late 1990s the Sykes sisters were sometimes described as the "twin set". Sykes later joked, with reference to the heiresses Paris and Nicky Hilton, that "Lucy and I were Paris and Nicky without the sextape" (an allusion to the sex tape featuring Paris Hilton and a former boyfriend that had been posted on the internet in 2003).

== Novels ==
- Bergdorf Blondes (2004)
- The Debutante Divorcée (2006)
- Party Girls Die in Pearls: An Oxford Girl Mystery (2017)
- Wives Like Us (2024)
