= Eleanor Cross, Sledmere =

Monument in Yorkshire, England

Coordinates: 54.0692°N 0.5825°W

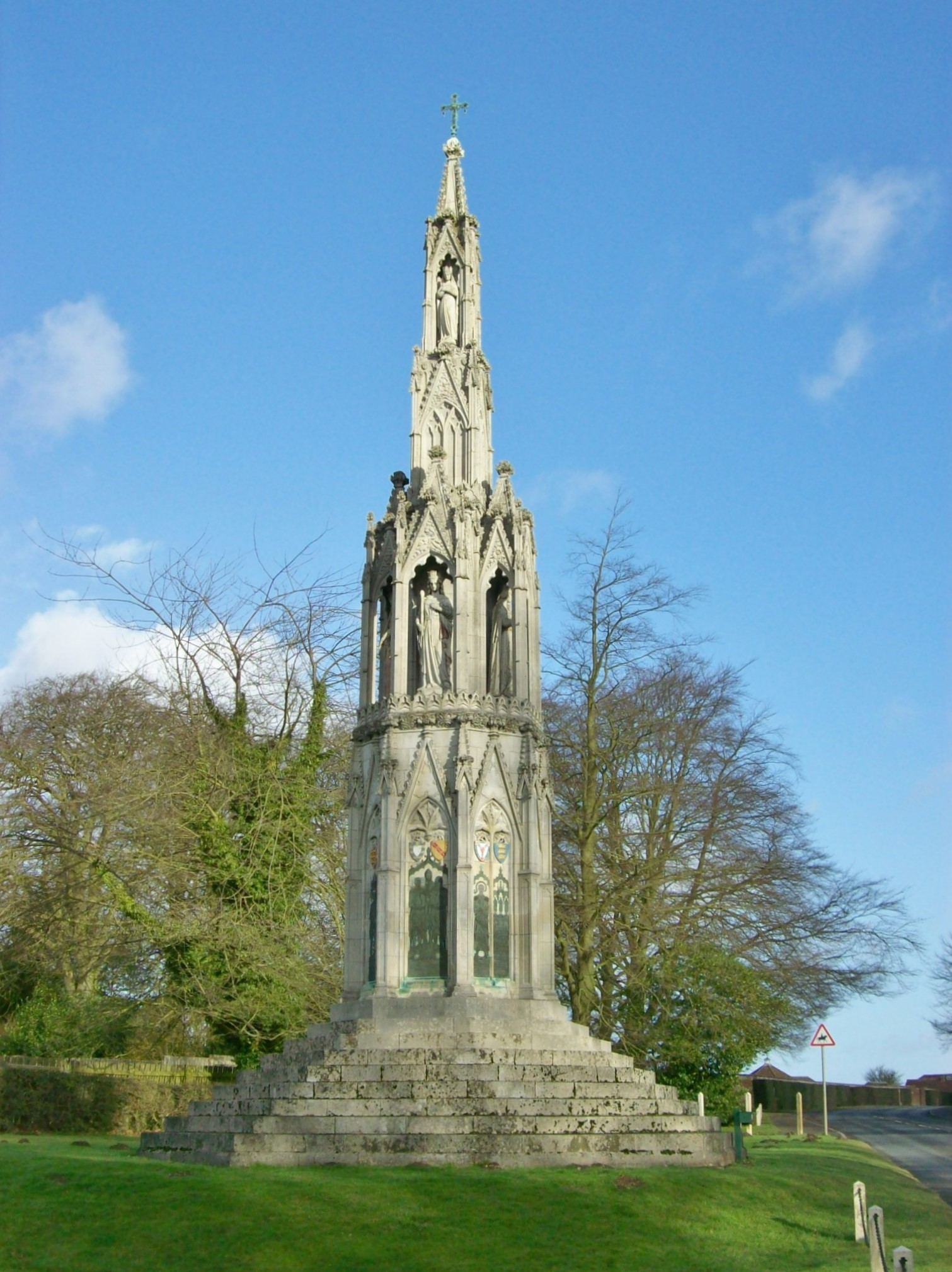

A replica Eleanor Cross was erected in Sledmere, East Riding of Yorkshire, in 1896–98. The tall stone structure was constructed by the Sykes family of Sledmere. Engraved monumental brasses were added after the First World War, converting the cross into a war memorial.

== Village cross ==
The 60 ft (18 m) high cross was commissioned by Sir Tatton Sykes, 5th Baronet (1826–1913). His wealthy merchant family had moved to Sledmere in the early 18th century and resided at Sledmere House.

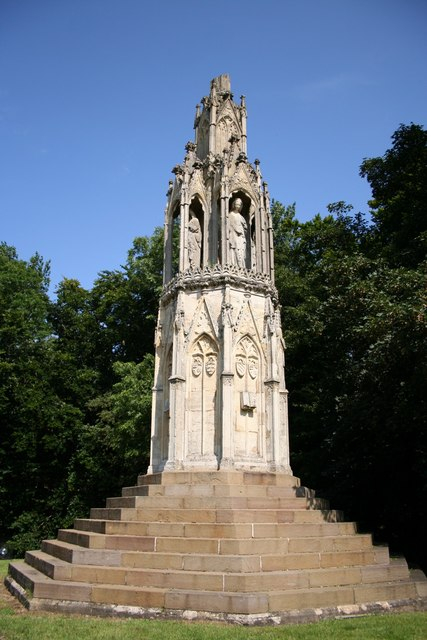
Eleanor cross, Hardingstone

The cross was designed by the architect Temple Lushington Moore, as a village cross, closely modelled on the 13th-century Eleanor cross at Hardingstone, Northamptonshire, with two square tiers on two octagonal tiers, standing on a base with eight steps and a plinth that is inscribed with the words of the Lord's Prayer. It was built from limestone ashlars by the stonemasons Thompsons of Peterborough, with ornamental carving by John Baker of Kennington, and erected at the west side of the village, near the Church of St Mary, part of the Sykes Churches Trail.

The first tier has blind tracery panels separated by pillars with pinnacles, standing on a moulded base, with sixteen carved heraldic shields, representing the arms of England, Kingston upon Hull, Beverley, the Holy Trinity, the See of York, Archbishop William Maclagan, a Gallic cock, and the arms of families related to the Sykes family. Between the first and second tier is a band with carved flowers and animals.

The second tier has four canopied open niches, each containing a different statue of Queen Eleanor designed by Moore; traces remain to indicate that these statues were originally painted. The third stage has four blind tracery panels. The fourth tier of the cross in Hardingstone has been missing for many centuries, so Moore created his own design for the top tier of the cross in Sledmere, with four closed niches each housing a statue of the Virgin Mary. The cross is topped by a stone pinnacle and a jewelled bronze crucifix.

== War memorial ==
The cross was redesigned as a war memorial in 1918 by Lt Col Sir Mark Sykes, 6th Baronet, to commemorate fallen officers of the 5th Battalion Yorkshire Regiment, the fallen from the Sledmere estate, and two other soldiers known to him, one who served in the 1st Battalion Cheshire Regiment and the other in Princess Patricia's Canadian Light Infantry.

Sykes added a bronze crucifix, and 22 engraved monumental brasses of the fallen soldiers made by Gawthorp and Sons of London. Some of the soldiers wear modern uniforms, but others (especially the officers) are in a 14th-century or Gothic Revival style, often presenting the soldiers as knights or with chivalric references. The brasses were installed over a period of time from 1918 onwards, with separate unveiling ceremonies, ultimately filling in seven of the eight blind panels on the first tier of the cross, with one panel left vacant. They vary in size and presentation, with one panel containing six in three rows of two, and others containing one, two or three full-length figures.

Sykes attended the Paris Peace Conference in 1919 as an expert on the Middle East, as he was a signatory to the 1916 Sykes–Picot Agreement, but he contracted Spanish flu and died in Paris in February 1919. The villagers of Sledmere commissioned one further figure of Sykes to fill the remaining eighth panel, depicting him as a knight with a shield bearing the Sykes arms and a scroll with Isaiah 66:10: "LAETARE JERUSALEM" ("Rejoice, Jerusalem").

The figure of Sykes was unveiled on 3 April 1921 at the same time as the last of the other brasses, at a ceremony attended by a guard of honour from the 5th Battalion, Green Howards, with which Sykes served in the Second Boer War and of which Sykes was the commanding officer when the First World War broke out in 1914. The ceremony was attended by veterans from the 5th Battalion Yorkshire Regiment, and members of the Sykes family, including Mark's widow. The figure of Sykes was unveiled by Father Oswald Smith, Abbot of Ampleforth Abbey; that of Lt Col James Albert Raymond Thomson, commander of the 5th Battalion in 1918, was unveiled by Colonel Commandant George Dominic Price DSO.

It bears an inscription: "THE NAMES INSCRIBED / ON THIS MEMORIAL ARE THOSE / OF OFFICERS AND MEN / OF THE 5 YORKSHIRE REGT / WHO GAVE THEIR LIVES / FOR THEIR KING AND / COUNTRY & THE LIBERTIES / OF MANKIND IN THE YEARS / OF THE GREAT WAR/LET YORKSHIRE MEN / CHERISH THE MEMORIAL/OF THIS HONOURABLE / COMPANY OF CITIZENS / WHO LEFT THEIR PEACE / (...) TO / UPHOLD JUSTICE PROTECT / THE WEAK AND DEFEND / THE RIGHT"; and then lists 24 names.

The cross was listed at Grade II in 1966, upgraded to Grade I in 2016.

== Other local memorials ==
The Grade I listed Wagoners' Memorial, designed by Sir Mark Sykes, stands nearby. Some miles away at Cowlam is a tall stone memorial to Sir Tatton Sykes, 4th Baronet.

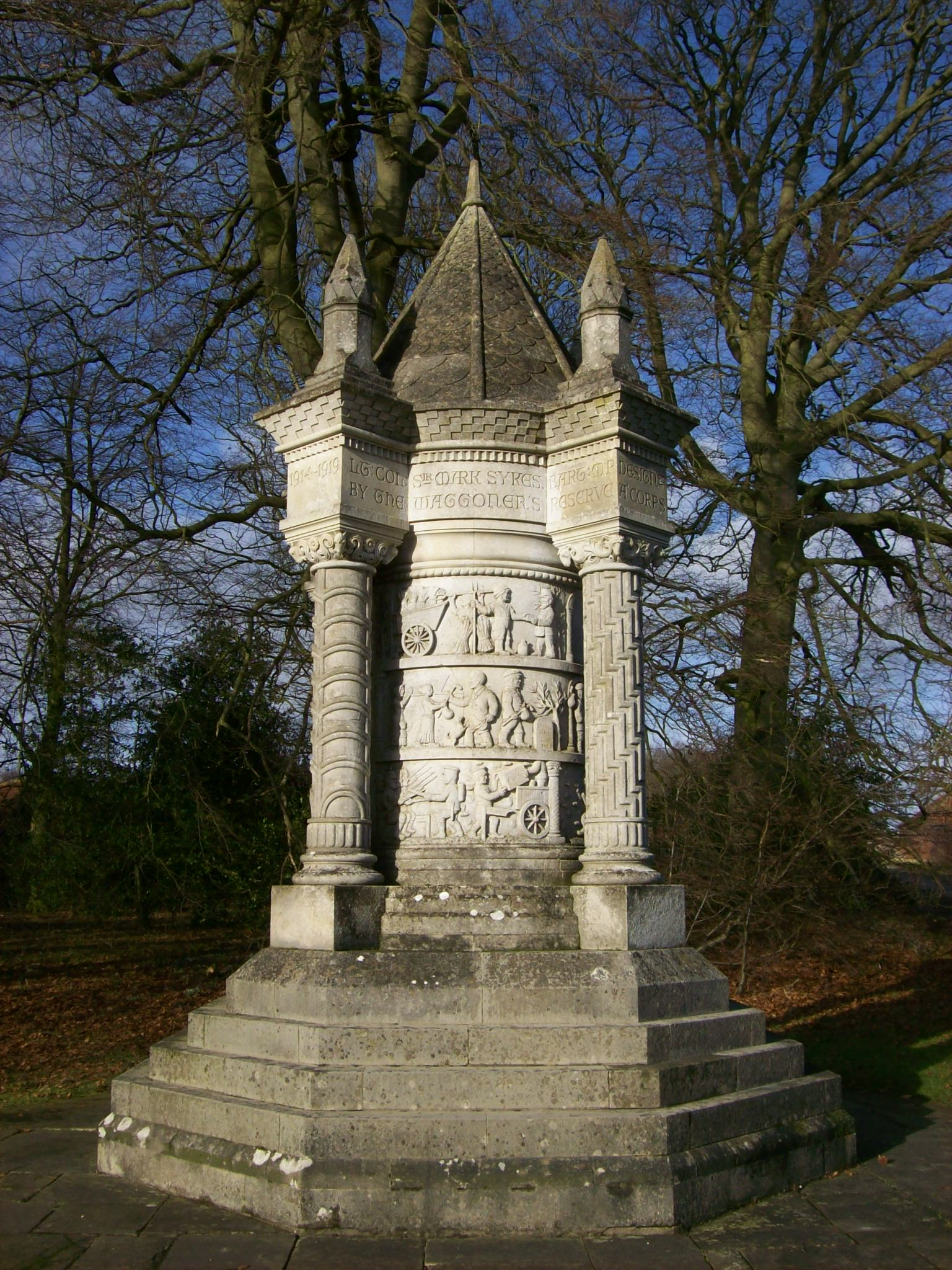
Wagoners' Memorial

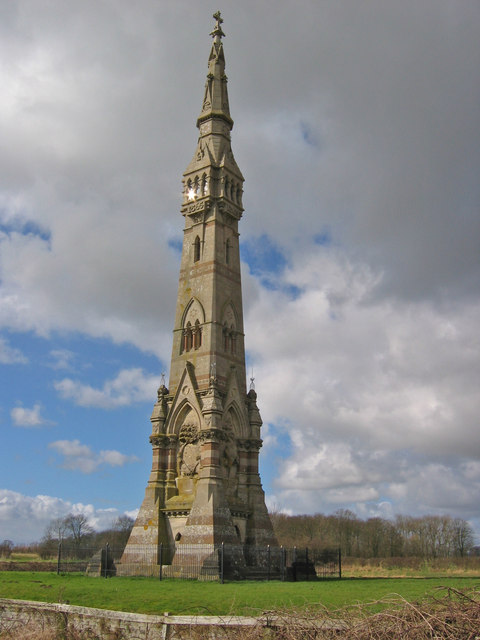
Sir Tatton Sykes's monument, Cowlam

== See also ==
- Grade I listed buildings in the East Riding of Yorkshire
- Grade I listed war memorials in England
- Listed buildings in Sledmere
