= Grade I listed war memorials in England =

There are 20 Grade I listed war memorials in England, out of over 3,000 listed war memorials. In the United Kingdom, a listed building is a building or structure of special historical or architectural importance; listing offers the building legal protection against demolition or modification, which requires permission from the local planning authority. Listed buildings are divided into three categories—grade I, grade II*, and grade II—which reflect the relative significance of the structure and may be a factor in planning decisions. Grade II accounts for 92% of listed buildings, while grade II* is an intermediate grade accounting for 5.5%; grade I holds the remaining 2.5% of listed buildings and is reserved for structures of exceptional significance. Grade I listed war memorials are deliberately very few, though several have been upgraded to grade I status as part of commemorations around the First World War centenary. A war memorial listed at grade I will be of exceptional interest for its design and artistic merit and will be of great historical interest. Such memorials are often the work of famous architects or sculptors, amongst the most prolific of whom was Sir Edwin Lutyens, whose memorials account for a third of all those listed at grade I. Lutyens designed dozens of war memorials across the United Kingdom and elsewhere in the Commonwealth, including the Cenotaph in London—the focus for the national Remembrance Sunday services—and the Arch of Remembrance in Leicester—the largest of Lutyens' war memorials in Britain; both are listed at grade I. As part of the commemorations of the centenary of the First World War, Historic England—the government body responsible for listing in England—is running a project with the aim of significantly increasing the number of war memorials on the National Heritage List for England.

This list includes only memorials that are grade I listed buildings in their own right. Memorials which are not free-standing—such as a plaque on a church wall—or which form part of the curtilage of a listed building—such as a sculpture within a building—but do not have their own entry on the National Heritage List for England are not included. For example, this list does not include the grade I listed Hall of Memory, Birmingham or Winchester College War Cloister.

War memorials in England take a wide variety of forms and commemorate centuries of conflicts, though memorials to conflicts and the soldiers who fought in them—rather than exclusively commemorating victorious commanders—only started to be commonplace after the Battle of Waterloo in 1815, which ended the Napoleonic Wars. The aftermath of the First World War (1914–1918) produced significantly more memorials than any other single conflict; thus this list is dominated by First World War memorials, many of which were later re-dedicated or added to reflect losses from the Second World War (1939–1945). Unusually, Southampton Cenotaph was rededicated to the dead from multiple conflicts later in the 20th century.

== Memorials ==
Name	ID	Image	Location	Conflict	Architect or sculptor	Type	Inauguration date	Listing date
Port Sunlight War Memorial	1343491		Port Sunlight, Merseyside	First and Second World Wars (Note: These memorials were built to commemorate the First World War, but were later modified to include the Second World War.)	Sir William Goscombe John	Sculptures and cross	1921	20 December 1965
Rochdale Cenotaph	1084274		Rochdale, Greater Manchester	First and Second World Wars	Sir Edwin Lutyens	Cenotaph	1921	12 February 1985
The Arch of Remembrance	1074786		Leicester, Leicestershire	First and Second World Wars	Sir Edwin Lutyens	Memorial arch	1925	23 February 1955
Liverpool Cenotaph	1073463		Liverpool, Merseyside	First and Second World Wars	Lionel Bailey Budden, Herbert Tyson Smith, sculptor	Cenotaph	1930	28 June 1952
Southampton Cenotaph	1340007		Southampton, Hampshire	First and Second World Wars, Malayan Emergency, Korean War, Mau Mau Uprising (Note: Southampton Cenotaph was built to commemorate the First World War and was later rededicated to include later conflicts.)	Sir Edwin Lutyens	Cenotaph	1920	8 October 1981
The Cenotaph	1357354		City of Westminster, London	First and Second World Wars	Sir Edwin Lutyens	Cenotaph	1920	5 February 1970
The Mercantile Marine First World War Memorial	1260087		London Borough of Tower Hamlets	First World War (Note: A memorial to the Second World War was constructed immediately behind the Mercantile Marine memorial; the two memorials are together known as the Tower Hill Memorial.)	Sir Edwin Lutyens	Miscellaneous	1928	27 September 1973
Royal Artillery Memorial	1231613		City of Westminster, London	First and Second World Wars	Lionel Pearson	Sculpture	1926	14 January 1970
Guards Memorial	1231315		City of Westminster, London	First and Second World Wars	H. Chalton Bradshaw	Cenotaph with sculptures	1926	14 January 1970
Spalding War Memorial	1064002		Spalding, Lincolnshire	First and Second World Wars	Sir Edwin Lutyens	Miscellaneous	1922	20 November 1975
"The Response"	1186201		Newcastle upon Tyne, Tyne and Wear	First World War	Sir William Goscombe John	Sculpture	1923	17 December 1971
Northampton War Memorial	1191327		Northampton, Northamptonshire	First and Second World Wars	Sir Edwin Lutyens	Obelisk pair and Stone of Remembrance	1926	22 January 1976
Chatham Naval Memorial	1267787		Chatham, Kent	First and Second World Wars	Sir Robert Lorimer	Obelisk	1924	5 December 1996
Plymouth Naval Memorial	1386464		Plymouth, Devon	First and Second World Wars	Sir Robert Lorimer	Obelisk	1924	1 May 1975
Portsmouth Naval Memorial	1386975		Portsmouth, Hampshire	First and Second World Wars	Sir Robert Lorimer	Obelisk	1924	25 September 1972
Preston Cenotaph	1218458		Preston, Lancashire	First and Second World Wars	Sir Giles Gilbert Scott	Cenotaph	1926	20 December 1991
Wagoners' Memorial	1161354		Sledmere, East Riding of Yorkshire	First World War	Alfred Barr	Column	1920	20 September 1966
Edith Cavell Memorial	1264768		St. Martin's Place, London, WC2	First World War	Sir George Frampton	Pylon with statue	1920	5 February 1970
Eleanor Cross, Sledmere	1083806		Sledmere, East Riding of Yorkshire	First World War	Temple Moore	Cross	1920	20 September 1966
Statue of Captain Albert Ball, Nottingham Castle	1246929		Nottingham Castle Gardens, Nottingham	First World War	Edwin Alfred Rickards and Henry Poole	Statue	1921	12 July 1972

== See also ==
- Grade II* listed war memorials in England
