= Listed buildings in Sledmere =

Sledmere is a civil parish in the county of the East Riding of Yorkshire, England. It contains 37 listed buildings that are recorded in the National Heritage List for England. Of these, three are listed at Grade I, the highest of the three grades, three are at Grade II*, the middle grade, and the others are at Grade II, the lowest grade. The parish contains the estate village of Sledmere, the hamlet of Croome, and the surrounding countryside. The village is centred on the country house, Sledmere House, which is listed, and most of the listed buildings in the parish are structures associated with it. The others include houses, cottages, farmhouses and farm buildings, a vicarage, a public house, a monument over a well, a school and master's house, a church, a churchyard cross, and two war memorials, one adapted from a village cross.

== Key ==
Grade	Criteria
I	Buildings of exceptional interest, sometimes considered to be internationally important
II*	Particularly important buildings of more than special interest
II	Buildings of national importance and special interest

== Buildings ==
Name and location	Photograph	Date	Notes	Grade
Triton Cottage and barn 54.07159°N 0.57701°W	—	Early 18th century	The house and barn to the left are in magnesian limestone, red brick and engineering brick, on a plinth, with quoins, a cogged eaves band, and a pantile roof, hipped on the left and with stone coping and kneelers on the right. The house has two storeys, three bays, and a floor band. The doorway is in the centre, and the windows are sashes, all under elliptical arches. The barn has two storeys and a single bay, and contains a pitching door under an elliptical arch on the upper floor.	II
Sledmere House; 54.06957°N 0.57917°W		1751	A country house that has been much altered and extended, and largely rebuilt following a fire. It is in stone with a Welsh slate roof and has an H-shaped plan, with a central hallway and an octagonal chapel to the north. The main front has two storeys and three bays, the middle bay slightly recessed, and the sides have three storeys and five bays, between two-storey single-bay projecting wings. The entrance on the northeast front has a porch with Ionic columns and a cornice, and a doorway with a fanlight with radial glazing. The southeast front has steps leading to a semicircular Tuscan portico. This is flanked by elliptically-arched recesses containing tripartite windows with Tuscan columns between, and a frieze above. The upper floor has round-arched recesses with tripartite windows, Ionic columns, and in the arches is a carving in relief in Coade stone. There are similar windows and arches on the side wings, Between the wings are sash windows, and on the west front the upper two floors of the three middle bays have giant pilasters carrying an elaborate pediment.	I
1–4 Gardeners Row; 54.07079°N 0.57640°W	—	Late 18th century	A row of four cottages in pinkish-brown brick, with stepped eaves and a hipped slate roof. There is a single storey and a front of 13 blind arches with impost bands. The arches contain four doorways and sash windows, all under elliptical arches.	II
Croom House; 54.07863°N 0.57417°W		Late 18th century	The farmhouse is in reddish-brown brick, with dressings in red brick and stone, stepped eaves, and a hipped Welsh slate roof. There is a T-shaped plan, the main range with three storeys and two bays, the right bay recessed, and a two-bay range to the left. On the left return is a porch containing a door with a fanlight, and a doorway with a fanlight under a cambered head with a keystone. Most of the windows are sashes, many with elliptical arches and keystones, on the middle floor is a Venetian window, and on the right bay is a round-headed stair window.	II
Cart house, stables and pigeoncote, Croom House Farm; 54.07918°N 0.57294°W	—	Late 18th century {probable)	The buildings, later used for other purposes, are in reddish-brown brick and clunch, with sandstone dressings, cogged eaves, and hipped Welsh slate roofs, with a ball finial on the left. They consist of a central two-storey bay in brick, flanked by lower two-storey three-bay wings in clunch. The bay contains a central entrance with a fanlight under a round arch of gauged brick, above which is an oculus and a pyramidal roof. The wings are on a brick plinth, with quoins, and contain entrances and windows under round arches of gauged brick, and pitching doors on the upper floor.	II
Barn and hayloft, Marramatte Farm; 54.06914°N 0.60352°W	—	Late 18th century	The building is in pinkish-brown brick with a hipped Welsh slate roof. There are two storeys, and central steps up to the hayloft, flanked on each side by four bays defined by pilaster strips. On the ground floor are six stable doors, four blocked, under segmental heads, two inserted doorways under soldier arches, and four casement windows under segmental heads. The upper floor has oculi, pitching doors, and vents in diamond patterns. On the gable ends are oculi in semicircular recesses with keystones.	II
Shop Farmhouse; 54.07072°N 0.57245°W		Late 18th century {probable)	A shop and a house in pinkish-brown brick, with stepped eaves and a swept pantile roof. There are two storeys, an L-shaped plan, and a front range of three bays. The central doorway has a blocked fanlight and a cambered head. To its left is a shopfront consisting of a door between two bow windows with friezes and hoods. The windows are sashes under cambered heads, and on the left gable end is a pitching door.	II
Sledmere Field Cottages; 54.03511°N 0.59204°W	—	Late 18th century	A farmhouse divided into two houses, it is in pinkish-brown brick, rendered on the front, with Welsh slate roofs. There are two storeys and three bays, the middle bay projecting, and a later range to the left. The middle bay has a full-height round-arched recess on the front and doorways on the returns with segmental heads. On the front is a bay window, and the other windows are sashes. The middle bay has a hipped roof, and the outer bays have lean-to roofs.	II
Gates, lodges and walls, Sledmere House; 54.07067°N 0.57290°W		Late 18th century {probable)	The eastern entrance to the grounds of the house are flanked by a pair of similar lodges in brick, on a plinth, with stone dressings and hipped Welsh slate roofs. They have an approximately square plan, with two storeys and a single bay. The front of each lodge facing the road has an elliptically-arched recess containing a three sash windows with aprons, flanked by Tuscan columns, over which is a frieze, a cornice, and a blocking course. On the return facing the drive is a doorway with a divided fanlight under a flat arch of gauged brick. Between the lodges are three sets of double wrought iron gates, the central gates flanked by ornamental piers on which are tritons. Outside the lodges are curving walls in gault brick on a stone plinth with flat copings.	II
Gates, piers and walls, Sledmere House; 54.07078°N 0.58004°W		Late 18th century	The wall running along the northern boundary of the grounds of the house is in pinkish-red brick, with tile and stone copings. It contains a gateway flanked by square brick piers with stone copings and ornamental wrought iron finials. Between them are ornamental wrought iron gates, dating from about 1700, brought from Venice and added during the 19th century.	II
Stables and carriage house, Sledmere House; 54.07029°N 0.58009°W		Late 18th century {probable)	The buildings, later used for other purposes, are in yellow brick on the front and reddish-pink brick elsewhere, on a stone plinth, with dressings in stone and red brick, stepped and cogged eaves, and hipped Welsh slate roofs. They form a square plan around a central courtyard, the middle entrance to the inner courtyard under a pediment. The round-arched entrance is under a portico with engaged Tuscan pilasters and columns, a frieze, and a clock in a moulded pediment. This flanked by two round-arched recesses containing doors, and above are windows. On the roof is a cupola with a bell, Tuscan columns, a frieze, a dome and a weathervane. Withing the courtyard are round-arched stable openings with fanlights, stone imposts and keystones. Above are casement windows and pitching doors.	II*
Walled garden, Sledmere House; 54.07073°N 0.57567°W		Late 18th century {probable)	The walled garden has an octagonal plan and a central dividing wall. The walls are about 3 metres (9.8 ft) in height, and are in pinkish-red brick with copings in stone and moulded tiles. The entrance on the west side has an elliptical arch, and is flanked by pilaster strips with stepped stone caps and ball finials, and above is a stone coped parapet. There are further openings on the south and north sides. The central wall has an elliptical arch with stone imposts, and piers with vases. The south-facing walls have heating ducts.	II
Walls, gate piers, railings and gates, Sledmere House; 54.06830°N 0.58310°W	—	Late 18th century	The walls on the west side of the grounds of the house are in pinkish-red brick with copings in stone and moulded tiles. The gates at the entrance, which date from 1813, are in wrought iron, and are flanked by wrought iron piers on which are tritons. Outside these are ornamental square stone piers with ball finials, and curved walls ending in plain square stone piers.	II
The Vicarage; 54.07127°N 0.57441°W		Late 18th century	The vicarage is in pinkish-brown brick, with red brick dressings and a hipped Welsh slate roof. There are two and three storeys, and three bays, the left bay projecting slightly. In the centre is a porch and a doorway with a decorative fanlight. The windows are sashes under cambered red brick arches.	II
Life Hill Farmhouse; 54.04501°N 0.58089°W	—	1778	The farmhouse is in pinkish-brown brick, on a plinth, with coupled pilaster strips to the corners, single strips between the bays, stepped and cogged eaves, and a hipped Welsh slate roof. There are two storeys and three bays. The central doorway has a segmental-arched head, and contains recessed jambs and a six-paned fanlight with a basket arch. The windows are sashes under cambered arches of gauged brick.	II
Marramatte Farmhouse, walls and pavilions 54.06902°N 0.60314°W		1778	The farmhouse is in pinkish-brown brick, on a plinth, with cogged eaves and a hipped Welsh slate roof. It consists of a central bay with three storeys, flanked by recessed two-storey single-bay wings. The doorway has a fanlight under an elliptical arch, and the windows are sashes under elliptical arches. Outside the farmhouse are walls with stone coping extending for about 7 metres (23 ft), linking with pavilions. These have two storeys and a single bay, an oculus on the upper floor, and a pyramidal roof.	II
The Castle; 54.06779°N 0.55098°W		1778	Designed as an eyecatcher to Sledmere House by John Carr, the building is in pinkish-brown brick and magnesian limestone, on a plinth with moulded copings, with stone dressings, and a roof in Welsh slate and ashphalt. The building is completely embattled. In the centre is a recessed two-storey bay containing a tall pointed arch with a moulded head, and a doorway with a fanlight, flanked by round-headed arches, above which is a modillion cornice. Flanking this are three-storey octagonal turrets with two-storey single-bay wings, and there are rear ranges. The ground floor windows have pointed heads, those above have flat heads, and on the top storey of the turrets are round-headed windows.	II
The Triton Inn; 54.07122°N 0.57658°W		c. 1778	The public house is in colourwashed pinkish-brown brick with a pantile roof. There are two storeys and six bays, the left bay projecting slightly, and the right two bay later, taller and slightly projecting. On the front are two doorways, the left under a segmental arch, and the right with a divided fanlight. The right bay contains a two-storey canted bay window, and the other windows are sashes, the window above the right doorway under a segmental arch.	II
Deer house 54.06020°N 0.57696°W		1792	The deer house in Sledmere House Park is in pinkish-brown brick and painted timber, with an eaves band and a Welsh slate roof. In the centre are three tall bays, flanked by lower single-bay wings. The front and rear of the middle three bays are open, with four tapering Tuscan columns carrying a timber pediment. The outer bays contain doorways with round-arched heads.	II
Sledmere Grange; 54.04958°N 0.52316°W		Early 19th century	The farmhouse is in pinkish-red brick, rendered on the front and sides, with quoins, and a hipped Welsh slate roof. There are two storeys, and an L-shaped plan, with a front range of three bays, and later infill. The central doorway has a fanlight, the windows are sashes, and all the openings are under wedge lintels.	II
Bloodstock Stables and Farmery, walls and gate piers 54.07151°N 0.57943°W		1830	The buildings are in pinkish-red brick with pantile roofs. They have a U-shaped plan and two central ranges, forming two courtyards. The northwest range has a tall two-storey central bay flanked by lower two-storey ranges with hipped roofs. It contains a round-arched opening with stone imposts, above which is a datestone and a clock, and a pyramidal roof with a cupola. The outer bays and the projecting ranges contain a variety of openings, including cart and stable entrances, windows and vents. Closing the courtyards and running along the road are coped walls containing basket-arched openings with keystones, and gateways flanked by piers with peaked caps and ball finials.	II*
Cart shed and workrooms to north of Bloodstock Stables; 54.07176°N 0.57903°W	—	c. 1830	The buildings are in pinkish-red brick, and have a hipped and swept pantile roof with stone ridge tiles. There are two storeys and three bays. The buildings contain cart entrances and windows under elliptical arches, and a round-arched opening with stone imposts. On the upper floor are windows and a pitching door, all under elliptical arches.	II
Cart shed to northwest of Bloodstock Stables; 54.07152°N 0.58005°W	—	c. 1830	The cart shed is in reddish-brown brick, with an eaves band, and a hipped and swept pantile roof with stone ridge tiles. There is a single tall storey and two bays. The cart shed contains two elliptically-arched cart openings, one blocked and with a slatted wooden ventilator.	II
Cart sheds to northeast of Bloodstock Stables; 54.07164°N 0.57846°W	—	c. 1830	The cart sheds are in reddish-pink brick, and have a hipped and swept pantile roof with stone ridge tiles. There is one tall storey and seven bays. The cart sheds contain a five-bay arcade of elliptically-arched openings, and at the ends are doors under round arches.	II
Carthouse and stables to east of Triton Cottage; 54.07143°N 0.577100°W	—	c. 1830	The building is in reddish-pink brick, with stone dressings, and a hipped pantile roof with stone copings. There is one tall storey and three bays. In the centre is an elliptically-arched carriage entrance with a keystone, flanked by round-arched stable openings with keystones and imposts.	II
The Well and railings 54.07088°N 0.57304°W		1840	A monument in sandstone, in the form of a rotunda with eight Tuscan columns. It has a square plinth on an octagonal base. The columns carry an inscribed and dated frieze, a cornice, and a lead-covered domed roof on which is a ball finial, and a weathervane with a fox. On the centre is a glazed cover, and at the sides and rear are iron railings with ornamental standards.	II
Fountain, Sledmere House; 54.06934°N 0.57959°W		Mid to late 19th century	The fountain is in the centre of a parterre in the garden, to the south of the house. It stands in a circular basin about 5 metres (16 ft) in diameter. The fountain is in artificial stone, and has a circular plinth and a tripod base, with statues of river gods supporting a trefoiled basin, and a further tripod above with dolphins supporting a circular basin surmounted by a putto.	II
Monument Cottage; 54.04403°N 0.53911°W		c. 1866	The house is in gault brick, on a chamfered plinth, with dressings in red brick and stone, a band in red brick, and a Welsh slate roof with decorative ridge tiles. There is one storey with attics, and an L-shaped plan, with a bay to the right, and a projecting cross-wing on the left with a coped gable. On the angle is a porch carried by piers with foliate capitals, above which is an oculus, and to its right is a bay window. The cross-wing has two narrow sash windows with quoined jambs, above which is a decorative shield, and two trefoil-headed windows under a red brick pointed arch.	II
School and schoolmaster's house 54.07022°N 0.57070°W		1874–75	The school and house were designed by G. E. Street, and extended in 1895–96 by Temple Moore. They are in reddish-orange brick on a plinth, with stone dressings, sill bands, and tile roofs with decorative ridge tiles. The school has a single storey and three bays. The doorway has a moulded surround, a pointed arch and a hood mould. The windows are casements with quoined surrounds and two or three lights, and above is a roof dormer. On the roof are a ventilator and a bell turret, both with a flèche. The house to the right is taller, with one storey and an attic, and a tile-hung gable. It contains a two-light window with a chamfered mullion and a quoined surround, and above it is a band of applied timber framing containing a window. On the right return is a gabled porch with timber framing.	II
Estate Office and Clerk's House; 54.07150°N 0.57594°W		1893–94	The buildings are in reddish-orange brick with stone dressings and tile roofs. The estate office on the right has a single storey and two gabled bays, the left bay projecting, containing a canted bay window, above which is a stone plaque. The clerk's house is at right angles, with two storeys, a front of three bays, the outer bays gabled, and two bays on the right return, containing a canted bay window. In the centre is a gabled porch. The doorways have four-centred arches, and the windows are mullioned or mullioned and transomed, with chamfered or quoined surrounds.	II
St Mary's Church; 54.06856°N 0.58042°W		1893–98	The church, which incorporates earlier material, was designed by Temple Moore. It is built in sandstone with a lead roof, and consists of a nave, north and south aisles, a south porch, a chancel with a north vestry, and a west tower. The tower has three stages, a stepped and chamfered plinth, a southwest stair turret, angle buttresses, a three-light pointed west window under a hood mould, bands, pointed two-light bell openings, a corbel table with gargoyles, and battlements pierced with crosses. The porch has a pointed opening, above which are three crocketed arches containing statues, a corbel table, and a low decorative parapet. Between the nave and the chancel are octagonal stair turrets.	II*
Former Post Office; 54.07146°N 0.57657°W		1896	The post office and post master's house, later a private house, is in reddish-orange brick on a chamfered plinth, with a tile roof. There is a T-shaped plan, with a single bay on the left and a projecting gabled cross-wing to the right. On the left bay is a projecting gabled porch, and the left return is gabled; all the gables have dentilled bargeboards. The doorway has a moulded surround, a four-centred arched head and a hood mould, and above it is a decorative oblong recess with a hood mould. The windows are mullioned with moulded surrounds, flat arches of rubbed brick, and hood moulds, and the window to the left of the porch contains a post box.	II
Eleanor Cross; 54.06919°N 0.58250°W		1896–98	Designed as a village cross by Temple Moore, it is a replica of the Eleanor's Cross of 1291 in Hardingstone, Northamptonshire. The cross was adapted as a war memorial in 1918 by Mark Sykes, including adding brass effigies depicting men lost in the First World War, and a bronze crucifix on the apex. It is in limestone with an octagonal plan on a base of eight steps, and has four stages. The second stage contains four statues of Queen Eleanor under elaborate canopies.	I
Churchyard cross 54.06848°N 0.58081°W	—	c. 1898	The cross is in the churchyard of St Mary's church, to the west of the church, and was designed by Temple Moore. It is in sandstone, and about 2 metres (6 ft 7 in) in height. The cross has a square plinth on which is a stepped octagonal shaft with quatrefoils to the base, and a moulded cornice surmounted by the remains of a cross head.	II
The Villa; 54.07140°N 0.57514°W		1898	The house is in red brick on a plinth with moulded copings, and has a tile roof with finials. There are two storeys, the upper floors sightly jettied, and three bays, the middle bay gabled and projecting, and the outer bays angled. In the centre is a doorway with an integral fanlight under a four-centred arch and hood mould, and above is a dentilled floor band. The left bay is gabled, and the right bay contains a full-height five-sided canted bay window, under a hipped roof. Both outer bays have moulded floor bands, and the gables have dentil-moulded bargeboards and drop finials. The windows are casements with hood moulds, some stepped, they vary in size, and some are cross windows.	II
Wagoners' Memorial; 54.06981°N 0.58194°W		1919–20	This is a war memorial in commemoration of the members of the Wagoners Reserve Corps who served in the First World War, and was designed by Mark Sykes. It is in Portland Stone, with effigies in carved stone, and is 6 metres (20 ft) in height. The memorial stands on an octagonal plinth of six steps, and has a squat central drum carved with depictions of the history of the corps. It is surmounted by a conical canopy with a pinnacle. Surrounding it are four carved decorated columns with carved capitals, carrying an entablature with a patterned cornice, an inscribed frieze, and octagonal finials with coronets.	I
