= Lucy Sykes =

British-American fashion executive

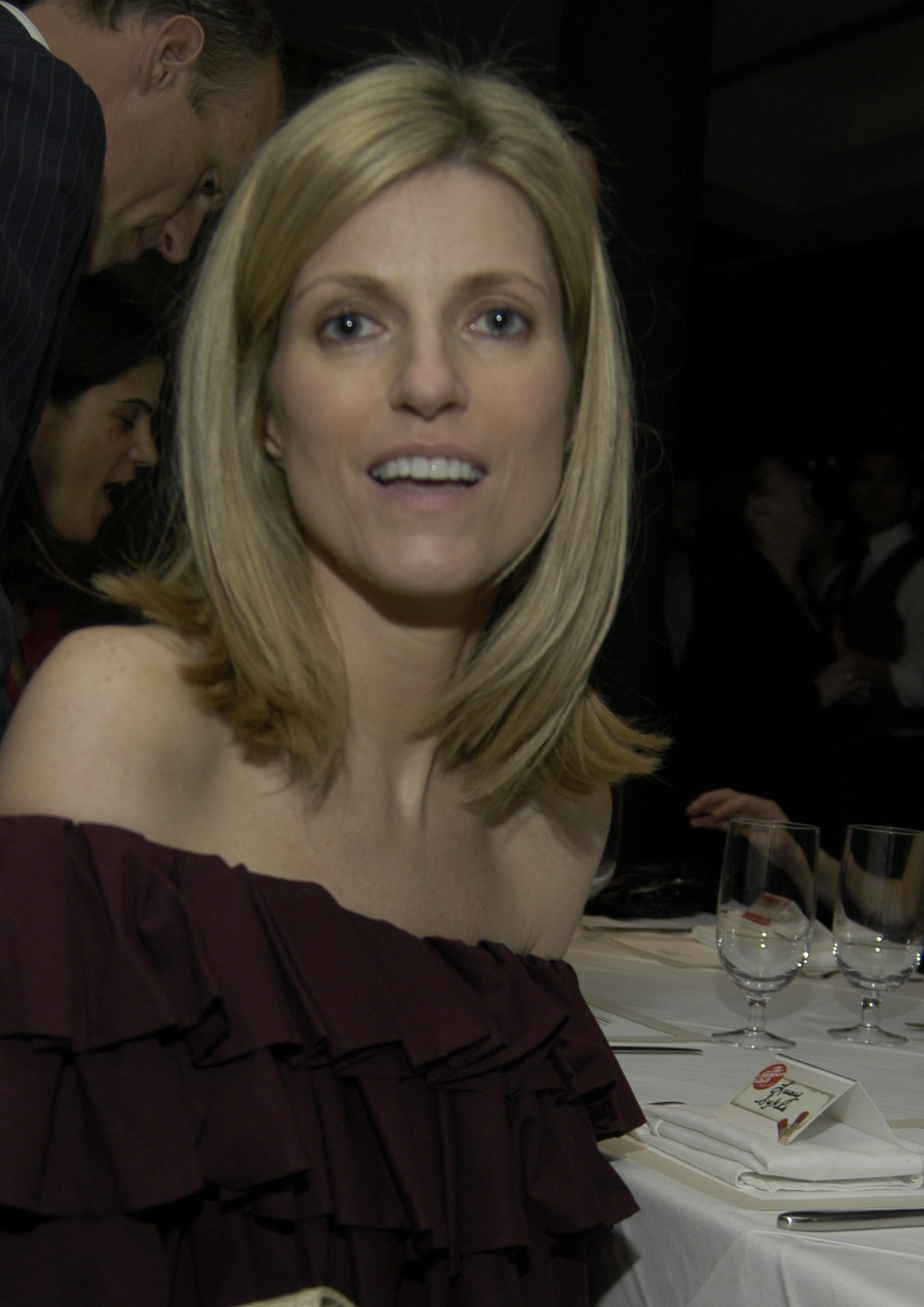
- Sykes in 2008
- Born: December 4, 1969 (age 56); London, England, U.K.
- Education: Italia Conti Academy of Theatre Arts
- Years active: 1995–present
- Spouse: Euan Rellie
- Relatives: Plum Sykes (sister); Christopher Sykes (grandfather); Mark Sykes (great-grandfather)

Lucy Sykes Rellie is a British-American entrepreneur, fashion executive, consultant and socialite based in New York City. She is known for being the fashion director of Marie Claire from 2001 to 2007 and the fashion director of Rent the Runway from 2011 to 2012.

After working in the fashion industry for over sixteen years, Sykes Rellie co-authored her first novel entitled The Knockoff in 2015.

== Early life and family ==
Sykes Rellie was born in London, and grew up as one of six children in Sevenoaks, Kent. Her mother, Valerie Goad, was a dress designer. Sykes Rellie's grandfather, Christopher Sykes (1907–1986), whom she knew as "Fat Grandpa" or "F.G.", was a friend and official biographer (1975) of the novelist Evelyn Waugh and son of the diplomat Sir Mark Sykes, sixth baronet (1879–1919), associated with the so-called Sykes-Picot Agreement of 1916, by which Britain and France provided for the partition of the Ottoman Empire after the end of the First World War. An 18th century forebear, the second baronet, Sir Christopher Sykes (1749–1801), was a major figure in the enclosure movement that seized ownership of common land for private use.

In 1985 Sykes Rellie left Kent to attend the Italia Conti Academy of Theatre Arts.

== Career ==
In 1995, Sykes Rellie moved to New York and joined Marie Claire as a stylist. Her elder twin sister, Plum Sykes, also came to New York in 1997. While Sykes Rellie worked at Marie Claire, her sister worked at Vogue. The two sisters became recognizable on the New York social scene, and were frequently described as "It girls". The New York Times wrote that the two "took New York by storm." After working as a stylist and then as editor at Marie Claire, Sykes Rellie became the fashion director of the magazine in 2001.

Sykes Rellie launched her own children's clothing line, called the Lucy Sykes Baby in 2005. In 2007, after she had her second child, she left Marie Claire to spend more time with her children, and began working as a consultant for various fashion industry companies. In this role she worked with T. J. Maxx, Tommy Hilfiger and Ralph Lauren. She also spent time as a contributing fashion editor at Cookie, and as a stylist on staff at Allure and Town & Country.

In 2011, Sykes Rellie began working with Rent the Runway as a consultant. The company hired her as the fashion director in 2012, a position she held for one year. In this role she led the brand's styling, serving as a designer liaison and a company spokesperson.

=== The Knockoff ===
In 2015, Penguin Random House published The Knockoff co-written by Sykes Rellie and Jo Piazza. The novel tells the story of a fashionista struggling to stay ahead in the digital age. The protagonist of the novel, Imogen Tate, has been compared to Sykes Rellie, who came back to work after a long hiatus and found it hard to cope with the technological developments. The novel was initially titled "Tech Bitch" but was changed in consideration of potential sensitivity. The book was sold as I Click Like This in Germany and as There Is No Glamour in Hell in Italy.

The Knockoff received positive reviews. Publishers Weekly called it "a winning romp of a tale" and Sydney Morning Herald called it "a sassy, timely and well-executed chick lit novel". While reviewing the book, Vanity Fair referred to the novel as a roman à clef, and called the story line "relatable to both the tech savvy and the tech wary."

Writing in The New York Times, Janet Maslin called it "[A] nicely executed bit of escapism." In 2016, it was announced that the novel would be made into a Bollywood movie.

=== Fitness Junkie ===
Sykes Rellie and Piazza released their second book, Fitness Junkie, in 2017. The satirical novel tells the story of a female wedding dress designer, Janey Sweet, whose business partner terminates their relationship because Janey has gained weight. Janey then tries to lose weight via a bizarre range of New York fitness rituals. Like The Knockoff, Fitness Junkie contains autobiographical and roman à clef elements.

Fitness Junkie has received positive reviews.

== Personal life ==
She married Euan Rellie in May 2002. They have two sons.

== Bibliography ==
- The Knockoff (2015)
- Fitness Junkie (2017)
