= Wagoners' Memorial =

War memorial in Sledmere, East Riding of Yorkshire, England

Coordinates: 54.0698°N 0.5819°W

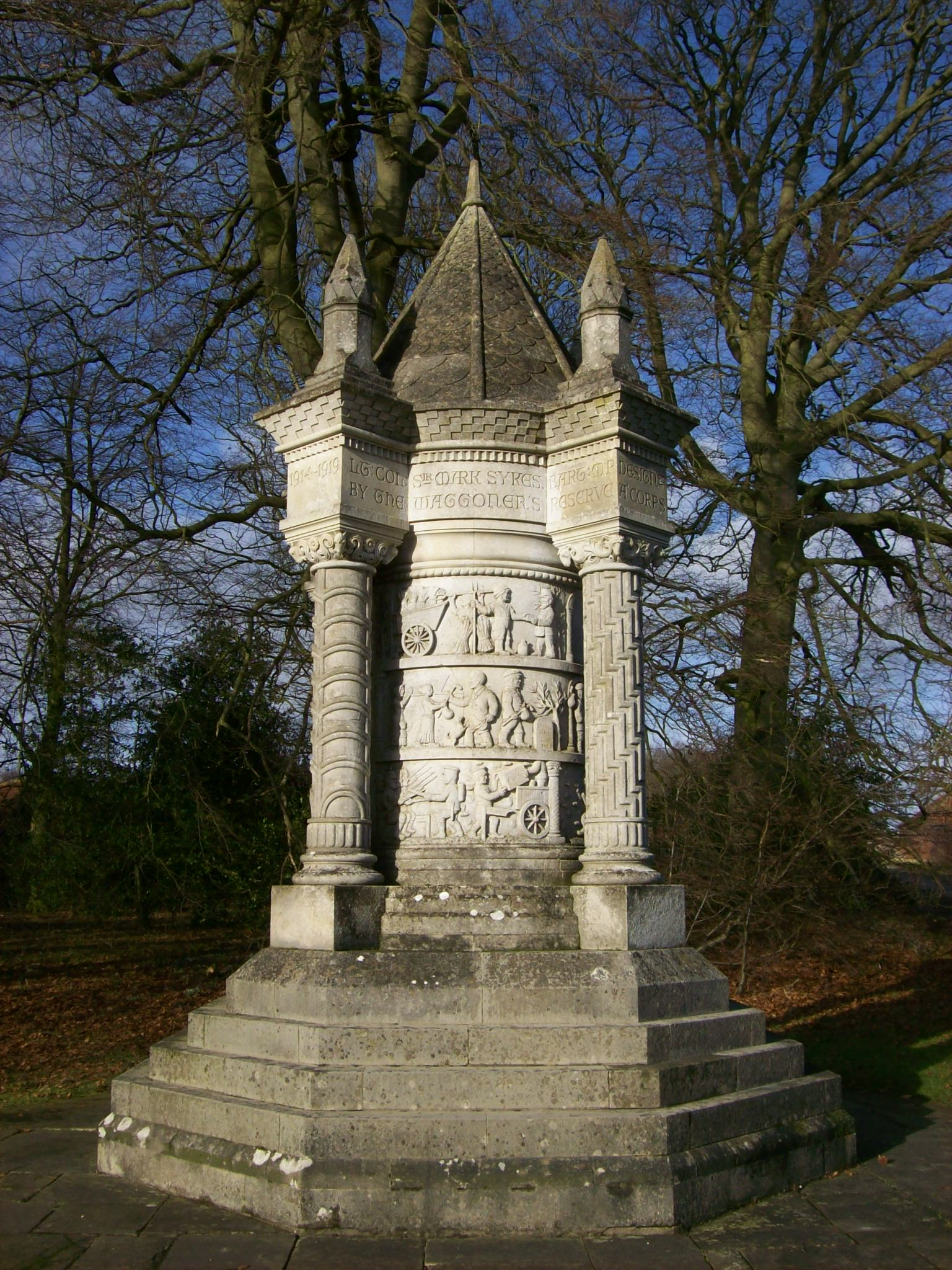
Wagoners' Memorial

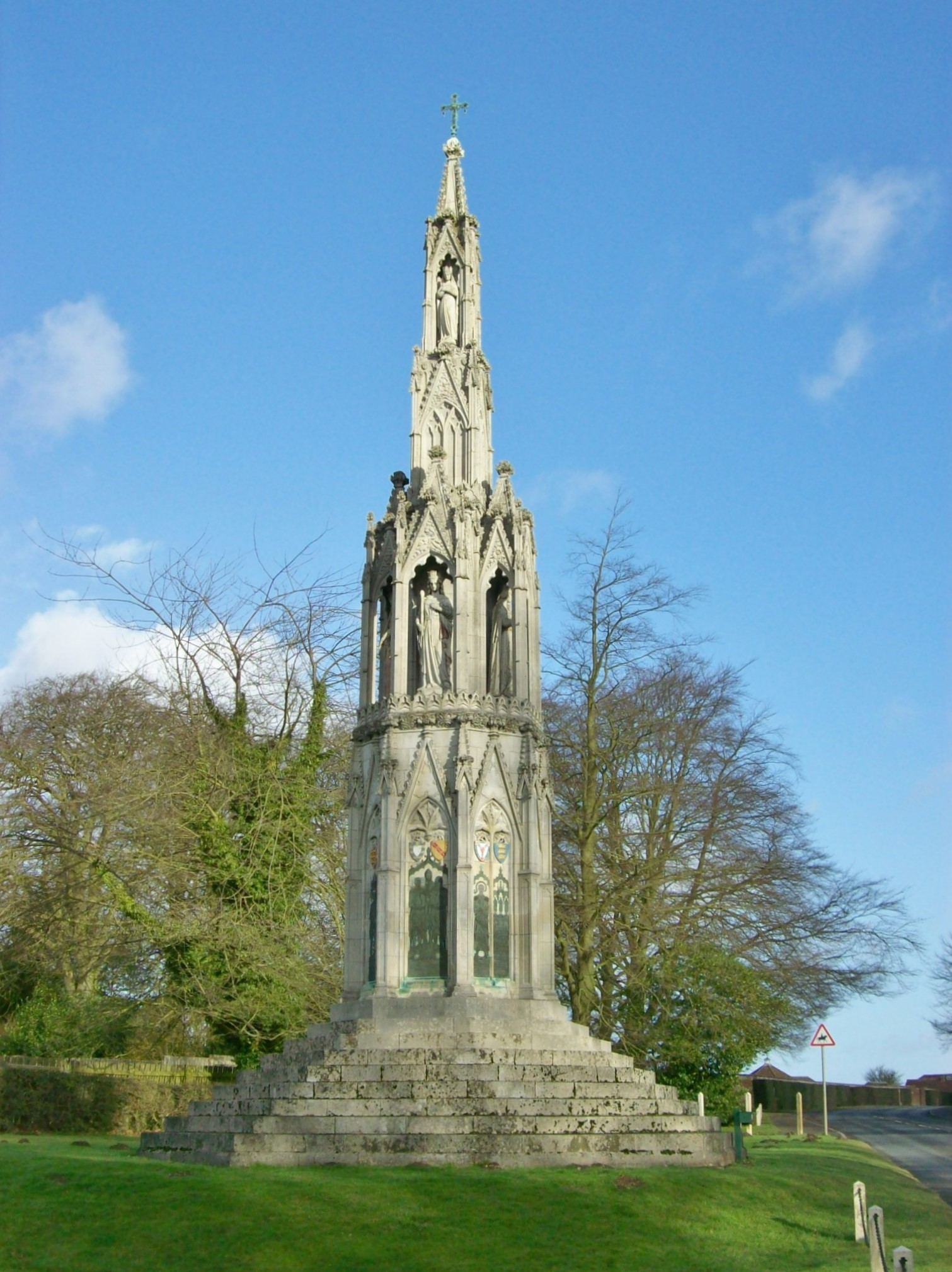
Sledmere Cross

The Wagoners' Memorial is a war memorial in Sledmere, in the East Riding of Yorkshire in England. The unusual squat columnar memorial was designed by Sir Mark Sykes, 6th Baronet and built in 1919–20. It became a Grade II listed building in 1966, upgraded to Grade I in February 2016. The memorial stands near the Eleanor Cross, Sledmere, a copy of the Eleanor Cross from Hardingstone, which was built as a village cross in the 1890s and converted by Sykes into a war memorial for the men from his estate.

== Background ==
Sykes was the son of Sir Tatton Sykes, 5th Baronet. He served in the Princess of Wales' Own Yorkshire Regiment in the Boer War and later as lieutenant colonel of the 5th Battalion, Yorkshire Regiment. He was MP for the local constituency of Kingston upon Hull Central from 1911 to his death in 1919. He inherited the baronetcy on his father's death in 1913. The 1916 Sykes–Picot Agreement is named after him.

Sykes received permission to raise the Wagoners Special Reserve as a Territorial Army unit in 1912, signing up farm labourers and tenant farmers from across the Yorkshire Wolds for war service as drivers of horse-drawn wagons. Sykes held wagon-driving competitions for his wagoners.

During the First World War, 1,127 men from the corps were called up to serve in the Army Service Corps and the Royal Engineers. Most were sent to serve on the Western Front in France, with little or no military training, and given the important logistical task of moving essential materiel: food, ammunition and equipment. Wagoners also served in Italy, Salonika and the Middle East.

Sykes attended the 1919 Paris Peace Conference, but contracted Spanish flu and died in February 1919, before the memorial was completed.

== The memorial ==
The memorial is to the west side of Sledmere, north of St Mary's Church, and near the Sykes residence at Sledmere House. It was designed by Sykes, and is said to be based on a Saxon memorial in the crypt at York Minster.

It stands 6 feet (1.8 m) high, with an octagonal plinth of five steps leading up to squat stone column of Portland stone, with stone carvings, with conical canopy and pinnacle, once topped by a cross (now lost). The central column is surrounded by four narrower columns, supporting a carved entablature, and inscription on the frieze. The masonry was built by Alfred Barr and the naive art sculptures made by Carlo Domenico Magnoni, curving around a central column in three sections, similar to Trajan's Column, showing scenes from the history of the Wagoners, from Sykes enlisting them, through them being called up, travelling to France, and graphic scenes of conflict. It was described by Pevsner as "curiously homely". The memorial is also inscribed with a five-verse poem in the local dialect.

The memorial was unveiled on 5 September 1920 by Sir Ivor Maxse, General Officer Commanding-in-Chief Northern Command. The ceremony was attended by 2,000 spectators, with a guard of honour from the 5th Battalion, Yorkshire Regiment.

The last wagoner veteran died in 1993.

== See also ==
- Grade I listed buildings in the East Riding of Yorkshire
- Grade I listed war memorials in England
- Listed buildings in Sledmere
