= Bergdorf Blondes =

Book by Plum Sykes

- First edition cover, Miramax Books
- Author: Plum Sykes
- Language: English
- Genre: chick lit
- Publisher: Miramax Books
- Publication date: 2004
- Publication place: United States
- Followed by: The Debutante Divorcée

Bergdorf Blondes is the 2004 chick lit début novel of Plum Sykes, an English-born fashion writer and New York “it girl”. The book was released in hardcover on April 7, 2004, by Miramax Books (USA) and Viking Press (UK) and a paperback edition was released the following year by Penguin. The book's title refers to rumors that one of the characters routinely gets her hair dyed a certain shade of blonde at Bergdorf Goodman, a luxury goods department store in Midtown Manhattan.

== Synopsis ==
The book follows an unnamed young socialite living in New York as she interacts with her best friend Julie and tries to find a successful romantic relationship. Initially she believes that she's found "The One" in the photographer Zack and the two become engaged, after which point Zack becomes emotionally abusive and unresponsive. Despite her best attempts to salvage the relationship, the protagonist is dumped by Zack. Not only does this harm her social standing, but the protagonist is psychologically devastated by the end of the relationship and becomes anorexic as a result. Things are not made much better by her mother's insistence that she return home to England (her family emigrated there during the narrator's childhood) and strike up a relationship with a local Earl that they haven't seen since a disastrous business transaction with her father years ago.

The protagonist goes through several terrible relationships with married men (she was told that they were single or separated) and finds herself drawn to and irritated by the filmmaker Charlie, who has started dating her friend Julie. The two eventually end up running into each other at a hotel one night after the protagonist's apartment is robbed. Despite some friction between the two, the protagonist finds that she genuinely likes Charlie, who tells her that he's broken up with Julie. The two end up having sex, something that weighs upon the protagonist's conscience since she has a rule against sleeping with a friend's ex-boyfriend. The following day Julie ends up finding out about the sexual encounter after questioning the protagonist about the night's events, upon which point she reveals that she and Charlie never broke up and tells the protagonist that she never wants to see her again. Since the friendship is gone, the protagonist decides to see Charlie again that night, as he had invited her to return for dinner. However the protagonist finds that Charlie has left, giving her the impression that he was just using her like the other men she has dated.

She ends up deciding to return to England, only for her car to break down partway to her parents’ house. The protagonist manages to make it to the home owned by the Earl, where she runs into Charlie, who tells her that he is the Earl her mother wanted her to meet and that he had left the United States due to news of his father's death. At this point her mother arrives under the guise of taking the protagonist home, with the intention of making her way back into Charlie's mother's good graces. This all proves to be too much for the protagonist and before leaving, she tells Charlie that she hates him and that she can no longer trust him since he never trusted her with any of this information. After returning home the protagonist ends up talking with Julie (who has traveled to England), who confesses that she and Charlie had broken up when he'd said they had but that she'd covered up the information since traditionally Julie was always the one to end a relationship. This causes the protagonist to realize that Charlie had never intended to be dishonest and she eventually meets up with him at his home, where they reconcile and officially become a couple.

== Reception ==
Critical reception for Bergdorf Blondes has been polarized. Hannah Sampson, writing for Knight-Ridder, called it a "superficial, vapid novel" that "refuses to be fun, interesting, witty or memorable." Rachel Cooke of The Guardian gave a negative review for Bergdorf Blondes, writing, "It is not that this book is badly written, nor even that it is poorly plotted... It is simply that it is so horribly empty, a bilious swirl of superficial characters and sickly values."

In contrast, USA Today was more favorable in its review, writing that "Blondes is an over-the-top, witty social comedy sure to put a spring in your step — whether you're walking in Manolos or Keds." People magazine gave the book two and a half stars out of four, commenting that "Bergdorf Blondes is packed with delicious sociological observations, one-liners... and tart definitions... But it's hard to care about the airhead-ed characters."
