= Croome, East Riding of Yorkshire =

Hamlet in the East Riding of Yorkshire, England

Coordinates: 54.083762°N 0.567249°W

Croome
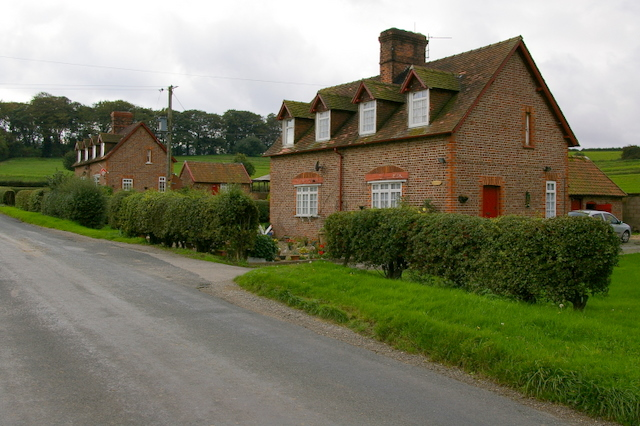
- Estate Cottages near Croome Farm

- Location within the East Riding of Yorkshire
- OS grid reference: SE938662
  - London: 180 mi (290 km) S
- Civil parish: Sledmere
- Unitary authority: East Riding of Yorkshire
- Ceremonial county: East Riding of Yorkshire
- Region: Yorkshire and the Humber
- Country: England
- Sovereign state: United Kingdom
- Post town: DRIFFIELD
- Postcode district: YO25
- Dialling code: 01377
- Police: Humberside
- Fire: Humberside
- Ambulance: Yorkshire
- UK Parliament: Bridlington and The Wolds

Croome is a hamlet in the East Riding of Yorkshire, England. It is situated approximately 8 miles (13 km) north-west of Driffield. It lies just to the north of the B1253 road at Sledmere.

It forms part of the civil parish of Sledmere.

== See also ==
- Listed buildings in Sledmere

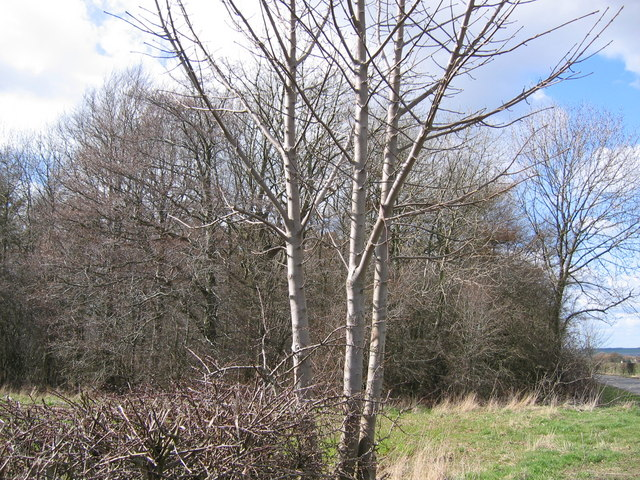
Croom Dale Plantation
