= Al-Sarirah Makki =

Designer of the Sudan flag (1928–2021)

- Al-Sarirah Makki ca. 2010s
- Born: 1928; Hashmab neighbourhood, Omdurman, Anglo-Egyptian Sudan
- Died: 10 November 2021 (aged 92–93); Khartoum, Sudan
- Notable work: Flag of the Republic of Sudan (1956–1969)

Al-Sarirah Makki Abdullah al-Sufi (Arabic: السريرة مكي عبد الله الصوفي, //, 1928 – 10 November 2021), better known as Macki Sufi, was a Sudanese visual artist, poet, and teacher. She is famous for being the designer of the Sudan flag after independence in 1956, which was raised by the Prime Minister Ismail Al-Azhari and opposition leader Muhammad Ahmed Al-Mahjoub to herald the declaration of Sudan's independence as they lowered the British and Egyptian flags, announcing that Sudan had become an independent and sovereign state. This was recognised by the United Nations in 1956.

Al-Sirra Makki wrote an patriotic poems, in which she called for the evacuation of the Anglo-Egyptian colonial forces.

== Biography ==
Al-Sarirah Makki was born in the Hashmab neighbourhood, Omdurman, Anglo-Egyptian Sudan, in 1928. She was from the Rubatab tribe. Her father was Khalifa Makki al-Sufi, a judge of the Sharia Court, and her mother was one of the first female students in the schools of Babikr Bedri, a women's education pioneer.

Al-Sarirah Makki graduated from Omdurman Teachers College in 1941, before working in schools in Umm Rawaba in North Kordofan, and Omdurman as a teacher of geography.

Al-Sarirah Makki died from COVID-19 on 10 November 2021 in Khartoum.

== Flag design ==
On 19 December 1955, the parliament declared the independence of Sudan from within, as the MP from the Baggara district in South Darfur raised his hand, asked the Speaker of Parliament for an opportunity, and submitted the following proposal: "We, the members of the House of Representatives, declare in the name of the people that Sudan has become a free, independent, and fully sovereign state". The proposal was seconded by the MP, Nazir Juma Sahl, from the Mazroub district, Umm Rawaba. Thus, Sudan gained its independence from within the parliament. The official announcement of Sudan's independence was made on 1 January 1956.

Flag of the Republic of Sudan (1956–1969) designed by Al-Sarirah Makki. The flag was replaced on 20 May 1970

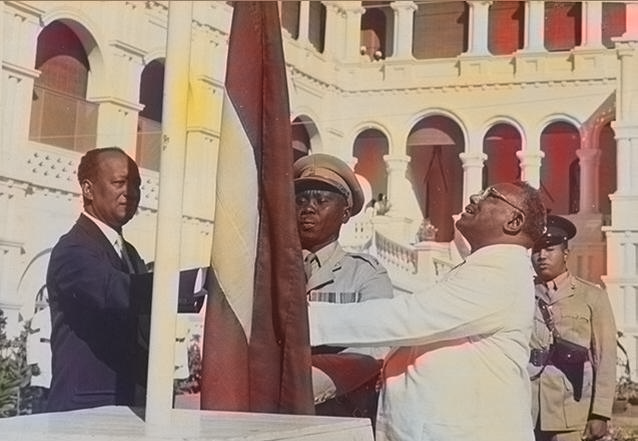
Sudan's flag raised at independence ceremony by the Prime Minister Isma'il Alazhari and opposition leader Muhammad Ahmad Mahgoub on 1 January 1956

Al-Sarirah Makki submitted her design to the Sudanese Radio through her brother Hassan Makki, and she did not disclose her real name at the time, being content to symbolize it with S. Makki Al-Sufi. In her submission she explained the colours of the flag, with green symbolising agriculture, which is the main profession of the people of the country, yellow symbolising desert, which is an integral part of Sudan, and blue symbolising water and the Nile. The flag that Al-Sarirah Makki designed was intended to resolve the Sudanese African and Arab identity.

On National Day of that year, Al-Sarirah Mekki stood before the British Minister of Education and said, "My wish is to see a Sudanese ruler and for my country to enjoy self-rule." She wrote a poem, "Oh, my dear country, tonight your salvation is complete," calling for the withdrawal of British forces.

The Sudan flag was raised on 1 January 1956 by the Prime Minister Ismail Al-Azhari and opposition leader Muhammad Ahmed Al-Mahjoub, heralding the declaration of Sudan's independence, as they lowered the British and Egyptian flags.

The flag was replaced by Gaafar Nimeiry on 20 May 1970. This was after the government decided to choose a new flag through a competition open to the public in which visual artists, ministers and ordinary citizens participated, and the design presented by the artist Abdel Rahman Ahmed Al-Jali won.

In December 2025, the president of Sudan's Transitional Sovereignty Council, Abdel Fattah al-Burhan, proposed readopting Makki's design.
