= Sledmere =

Village in the East Riding of Yorkshire, England

Coordinates: 54.071429°N 0.576323°W

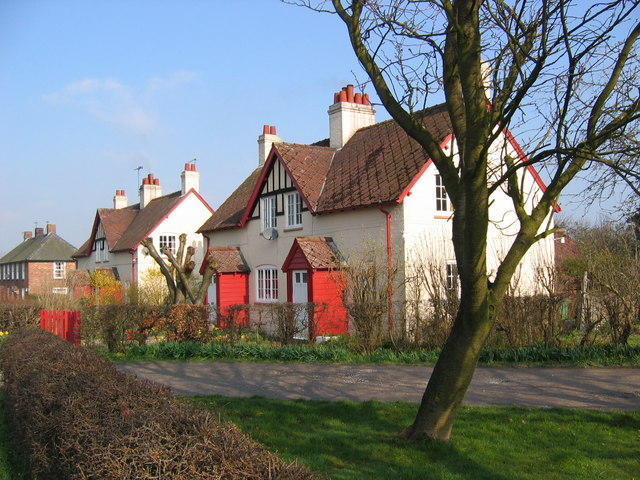
- Sledmere Cottages

- Location within the East Riding of Yorkshire
- OS grid reference: SE932648
- Civil parish: Sledmere
- Unitary authority: East Riding of Yorkshire
- Ceremonial county: East Riding of Yorkshire
- Region: Yorkshire and the Humber
- Country: England
- Sovereign state: United Kingdom
- Post town: DRIFFIELD
- Postcode district: YO25
- Dialling code: 01377
- Police: Humberside
- Fire: Humberside
- Ambulance: Yorkshire
- UK Parliament: Bridlington and The Wolds

The civil parish within the East Riding of Yorkshire

Sledmere is a village in the East Riding of Yorkshire, England, about 7 miles (11 km) north-west of Driffield on the B1253 road.

The village lies in a civil parish which is also officially called "Sledmere" by the Office for National Statistics, although the county council and parish council refer to it as Sledmere and Croome, as the parish also includes the nearby hamlet of Croome. According to the 2011 UK census, the parish had a population of 377, an increase on the 2001 UK census figure of 197; the parish covers an area of 2,849 hectares (7,040 acres).

The name Sledmere derives from the Old English slædmere meaning 'valley mere'.

== Local landmarks ==
Local points of interest include Sledmere House, a Georgian country house. Built in 1751 by Richard Sykes, the house has remained in the Sykes family since then. It is now the home of Sir Tatton Sykes, 8th baronet.

The Sledmere Monument is about 2 miles (3 km) south-east of the village, along the B1252 road, on top of Garton Hill. It is 120 feet (37 m) tall and is a tribute to Sir Tatton Sykes, 4th Baronet, built by his friends in 1865.

The Wagoners' Memorial in the village, designed by Sir Mark Sykes, 6th Baronet, is dedicated to the Wolds Wagoners Reserve, a corps that Sir Mark raised from the local population to fight in the First World War. It is noted for its unusual shape and its graphic scenes of war and country life. The memorial was designated a Grade II listed building in September 1966, but upgraded to Grade I in March 2016.

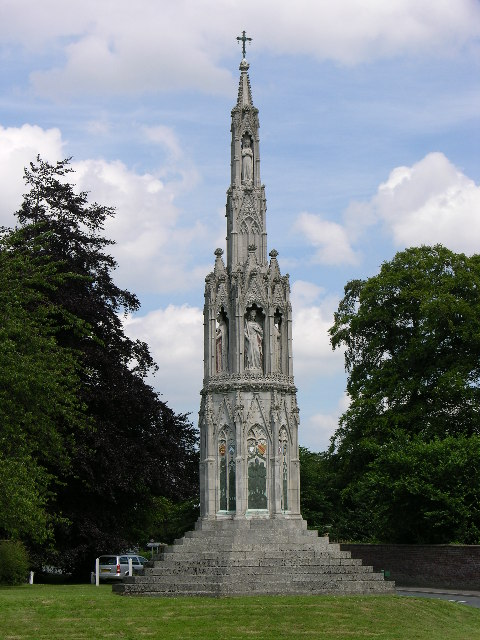
Sledmere Cross

Sledmere is also the site of the Sledmere Cross, a replica Eleanor cross erected in 1896–98 (as a folly) by Sir Tatton Sykes, 5th Baronet. His son, Sir Mark, converted it during and after the First World War to a war memorial, by adding a series of portrait monumental brasses in commemoration of friends and local men who had fallen in the war. Sir Mark himself served as a diplomat in the Middle East during the war, and died of the Spanish flu in Paris during the peace negotiations of 1919: he is represented by one of the brasses on the monument, in the dress of a crusader, and with the inscription "Laetare Jerusalem" ("Rejoice Jerusalem"). The cross was designated a Grade II listed building in 1966, but upgraded to Grade I in 2016.

East of the village is Sledmere Castle, a folly built around 1790 by John Carr for Sir Christopher Sykes, the 2nd baronet, to enhance the view from Sledmere House.

The church of St Mary is one of the churches on the Sykes Churches Trail. In 1966 the church was designated a Grade II* listed building.

Sledmere was served by Sledmere and Fimber railway station on the Malton and Driffield Railway between 1853 and 1950.

== See also ==
- Listed buildings in Sledmere

== Images of Sledmere ==
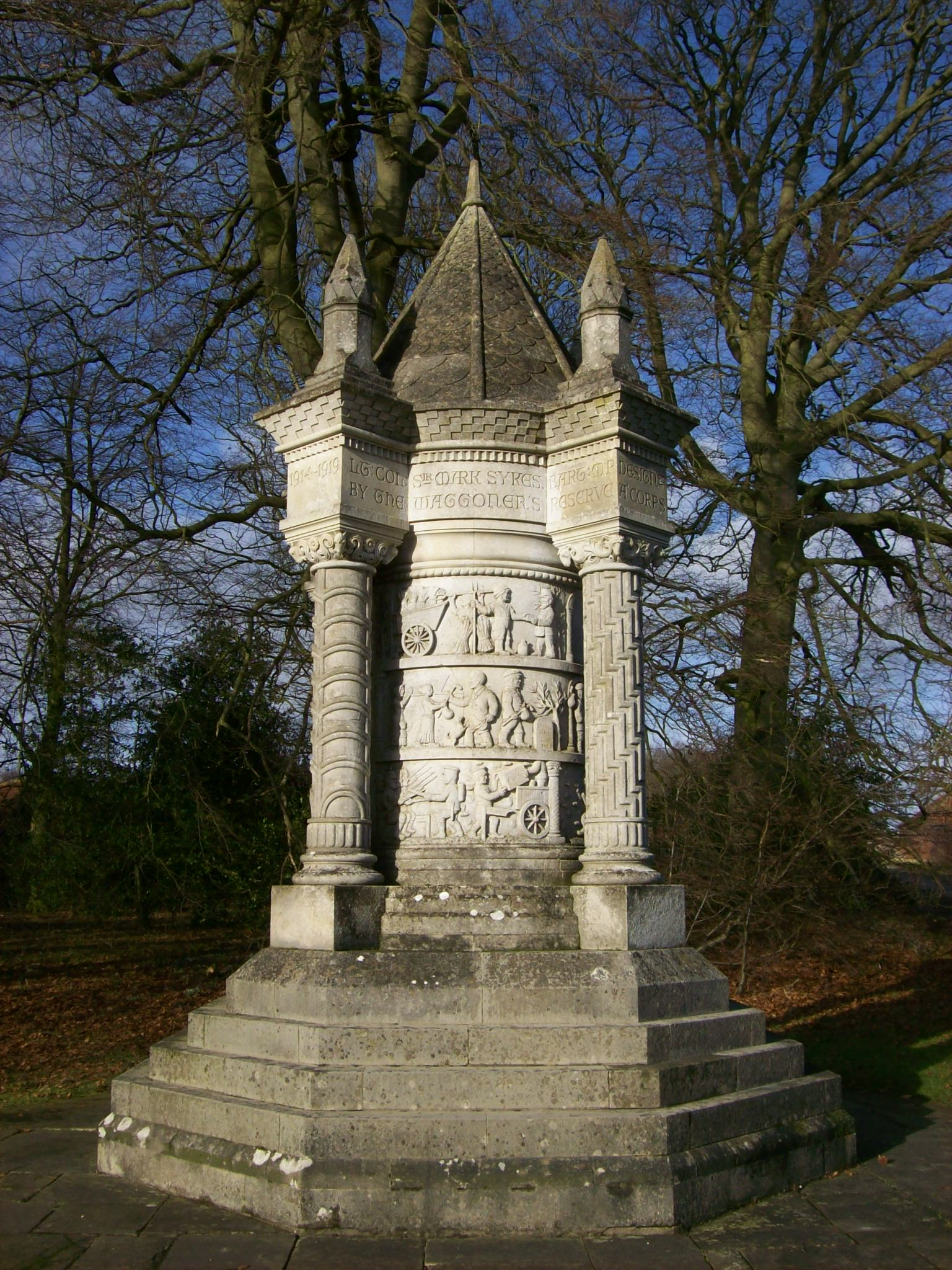
Wolds Wagoners Reserve war memorial

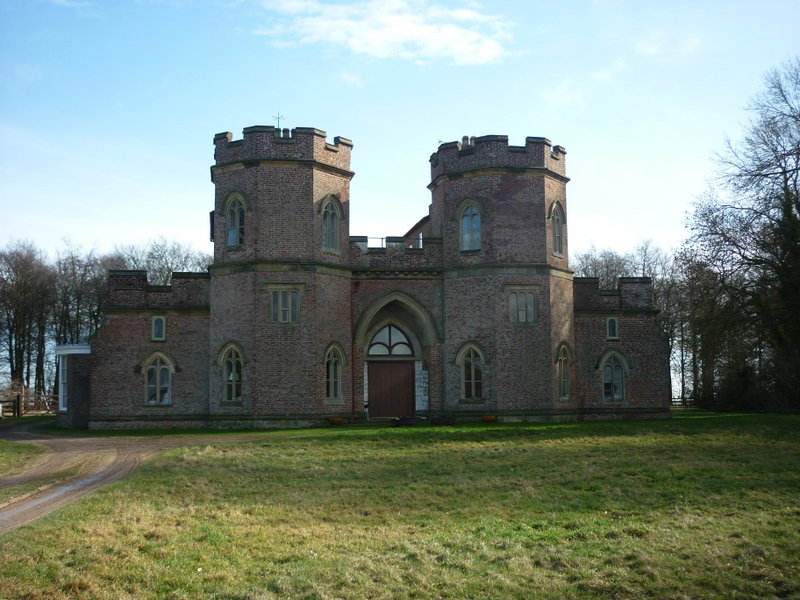
Sledmere Castle

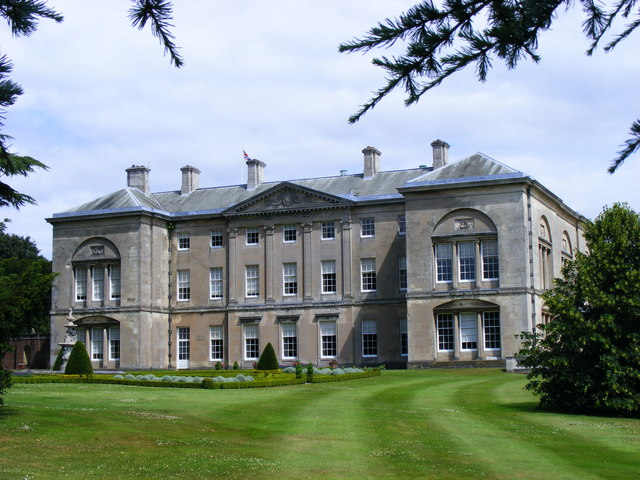
Sledmere House

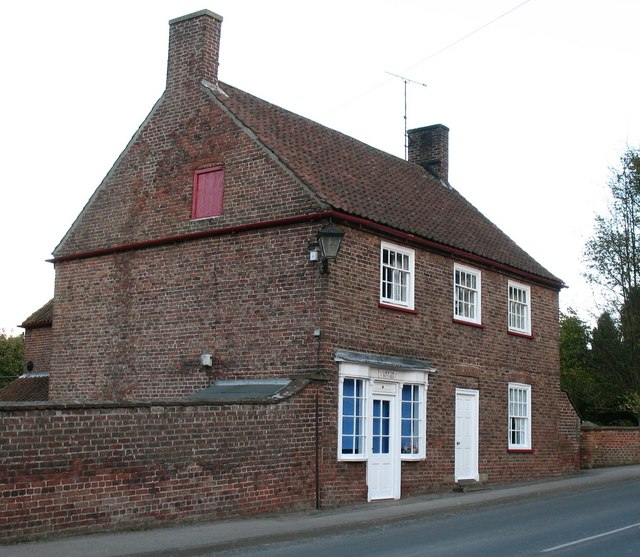
Butchers shop

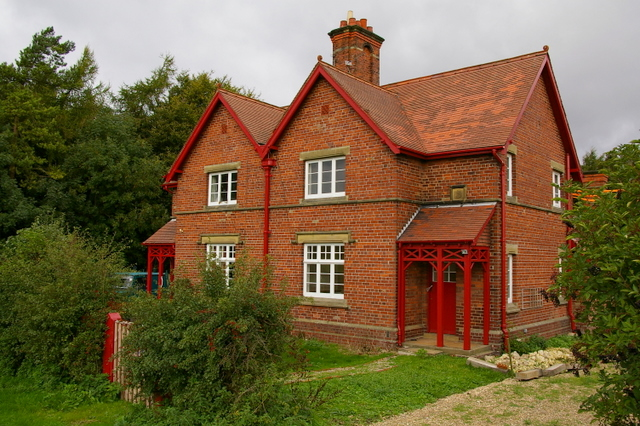
Estate Cottages near Warren Farm
