= Jo Piazza =

American journalist and author

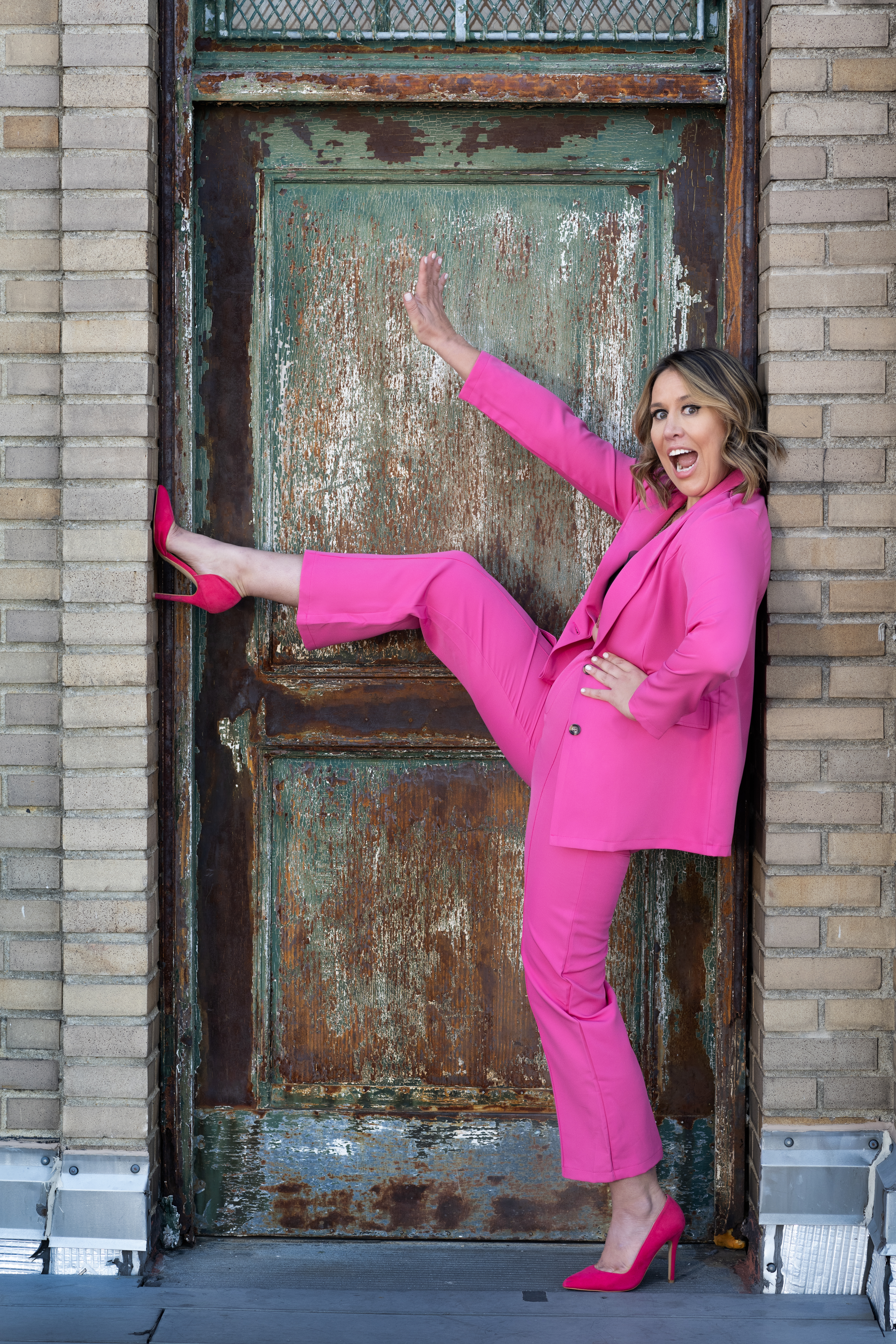
- Jo Piazza in 2023
- Occupation: Journalist
- Writing career
- Genres: fiction and non-fiction

Jo Piazza is an American journalist, editor, and author of thirteen books, including The Sicilian Inheritance and the Good Morning America Book Club pick We Are Not Like Them with Christine Pride. She’s also the host of the Under the Influence podcast. She has written and reported for The Wall Street Journal, New York Daily News, The New York Times, and Slate.

== Education & Career ==
Piazza attended the University of Pennsylvania where she earned a degree in economics in 2002.. She was initiated as a member of Delta Delta Delta.

Piazza is a novelist and podcaster known for her challenging of "tradwives". Earlier in her career, Piazza was senior digital editor at Current TV. She returned to celebrity news as the Executive News Director for the print and digital editions of In Touch Weekly and Life & Style magazines. Most recently Piazza served as managing editor for Yahoo! Travel.

== Works ==
- Piazza, Jo (2011). Celebrity, Inc. Open Road Media E-riginal. ISBN 978-1-4532-1879-2.
- Love Rehab New York : Open Road Media, 2013. ISBN 9781453295076, OCLC 816030740
- If Nuns Ruled the World New York : Open Road Integrated Media, 2014. ISBN 9781497601901, OCLC 876669625
- The Knockoff Anchor Books 2016. ISBN 9781101872208, OCLC 921865479
- How to be Married New York : Harmony Books, 2017. ISBN 9780451495556, OCLC 1005000747
- Fitness Junkie New York : Doubleday, 2017. ISBN 9780385541800, OCLC 959666504
- Charlotte Walsh likes to win : a novel, New York : Simon & Schuster, 2018. ISBN 9781501179419, OCLC 1006803017
- Pride, Christine; Piazza, Jo (2021-02-09). We Are Not Like Them. William Morrow. ISBN 978-0-06-294072-8.
- Pride, Christine; Piazza, Jo (2024-06-11). You Were Always Mine. Atria Books. ISBN 978-1668005521.
- Piazza, Jo (2024-04-02). The Sicilian Inheritance. New York: Penguin. ISBN 978-0-593-47416-7.
- Everyone Is Lying to You. Dutton, 2025. ISBN 979-8217046485
