= Flag of Sudan =

Republic of the Sudan
- Use: National flag, civil and state ensign
- Proportion: 1:2
- Adopted: 20 May 1970; 56 years ago
- Design: A horizontal tricolour of red, white, and black; with a green triangle based at the hoist.
- Designed by: Abdel Rahman Ahmed Al-Jali

The flag of Sudan (عَلَم السُّودَان) used since 20 May 1970 consists of a horizontal red-white-black tricolour with a green triangle at the hoist. The flag is based on the Arab Liberation Flag of the Egyptian Revolution of 1952. Upon gaining independence in 1956, Sudan, adopted a horizontal tricolour of blue, yellow and green. This flag was abandoned after the 1969 military coup of Gaafar Nimeiry.

== Flag history ==
=== Flags of the Mahdists ===
In 1881, at the beginning of the Mahdist War, self-proclaimed Mahdi, Muhammad Ahmad appointed Abdallahi ibn Muhammad as one of his four caliphs and handed him a black flag. Abdallahi used his black flag to recruit Baggara Arabs and other tribes from the west. The other caliphs used different coloured flags. The black horizontal stripe in the current Sudanese flag is a reference to this Mahdist-era black flag.

Flag used during the Mahdist Revolt and in Mahdist Sudan (1881–1899)

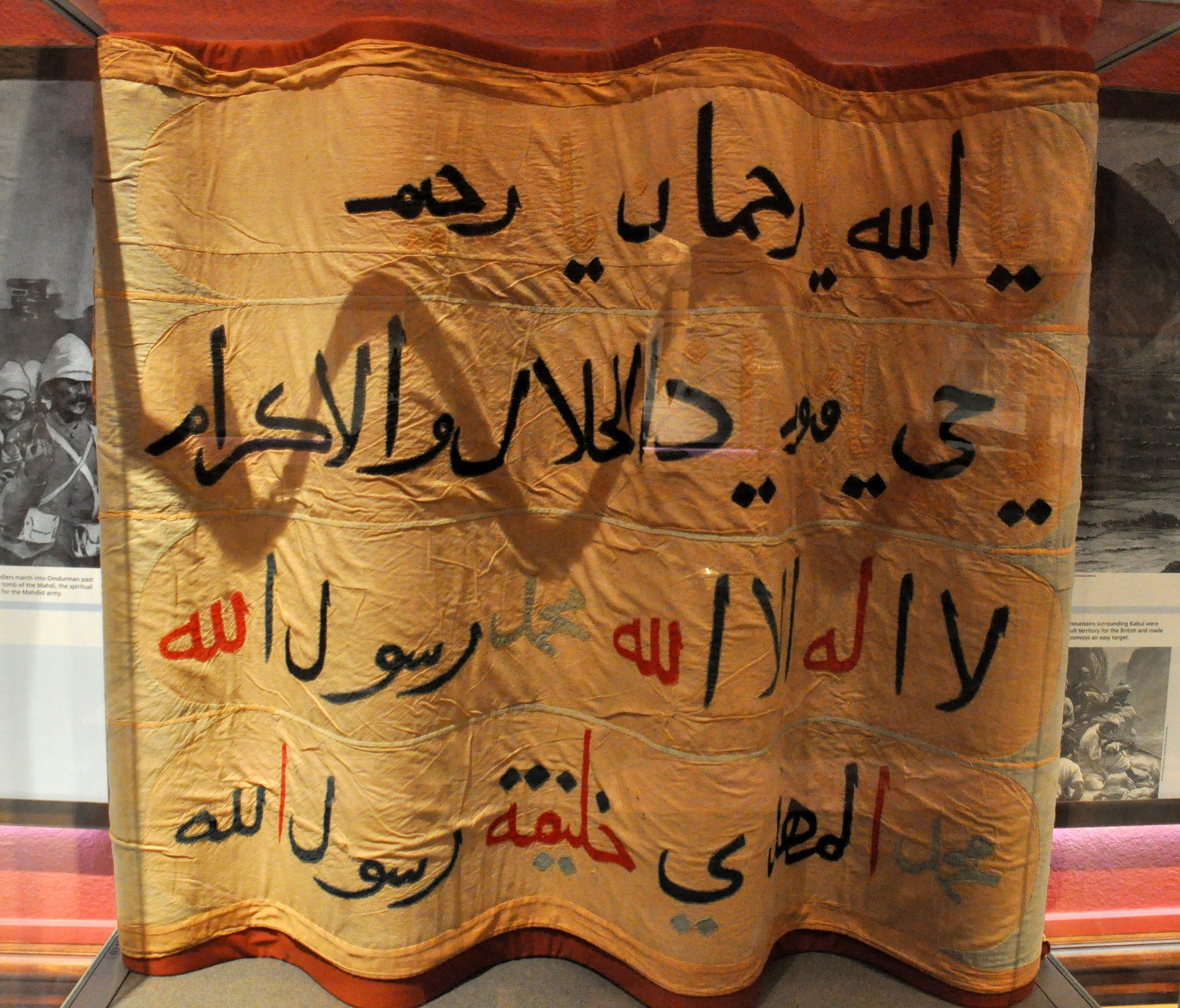
Banner used by the Mahdist Army; captured at Omdurman in 1898.

The black standard was also used in Mahdist Sudan

=== Anglo-Egyptian Sudan ===
Between 1899 and 1956, Anglo-Egyptian Sudan was administered jointly as a condominium by Egypt and the United Kingdom. The condominium did not have its own flag; instead the flag of Egypt and the flag of the United Kingdom were always flown together, with the British flag taking precedence.

A flag did exist as a rank flag for the British Governor General of the Sudan. In common with the rank flags of governors and commissioners of other British overseas territories, it consisted of a Union Flag defaced with a white disk bearing the territory's badge or coat of arms, surrounded by a wreath of laurel. As no badge or coat of arms existed for Anglo-Egyptian Sudan, the disk instead contained the words "GOVERNOR GENERAL OF THE SUDAN".

At the Afro–Asian Conference held between 18 and 24 April 1955, Sudan was represented by a white flag bearing the name "SUDAN" in red capital letters.

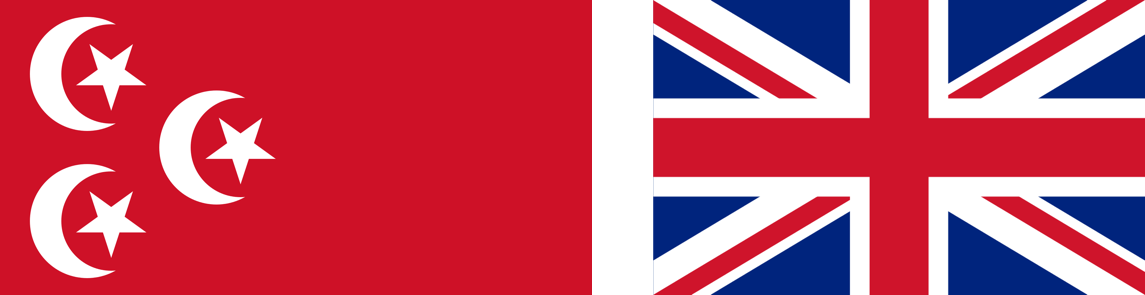
Flags used in Anglo-Egyptian Sudan (1914–1922)

Flags used in Anglo-Egyptian Sudan (1922–1956)

Flag of the British Governor General

Flag of the Sudan Defence Force (1925–1956)

Flag used to represent Sudan at the Afro–Asian Conference (April 1955)

=== Republic of Sudan (1956–1969) ===
Republic of Sudan
- Use: National flag, civil and state ensign
- Proportion: 1:2
- Adopted: 1956
- Relinquished: 1970; 14 years of use
- Design: A horizontal tricolour of blue, yellow and green.
- Designed by: Macki Sufi

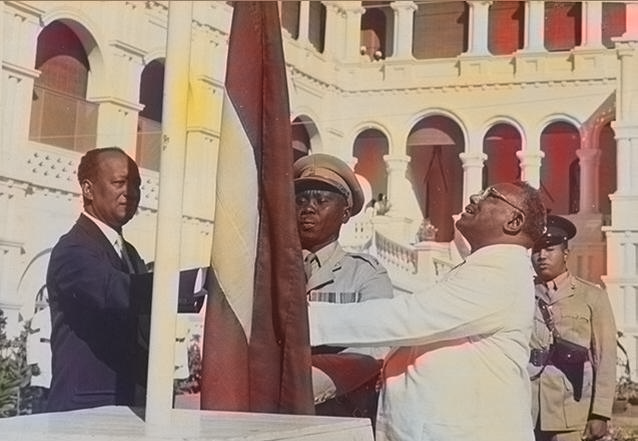
Sudan's flag raised at independence ceremony by Prime Minister Isma'il Alazhari and opposition leader Muhammad Ahmad Mahgoub on 1 January 1956

Upon the independence of the Republic of Sudan from Anglo-Egyptian rule on 1 January 1956, Sudan adopted a blue-yellow-green tricolour as its national flag.

The flag was designed by the poet Macki Sufi and remained in use until 1970, when the current flag was adopted. The colours of the flag represented the River Nile (blue), the Sahara (yellow) and farmlands (green). They were chosen as they were neutral between ethnic groups and political parties.

Use of this flag resurfaced during the 2018–19 Sudanese protests. The president of the Transitional Sovereignty Council, Abdel Fattah al-Burhan, proposed readopting the blue-yellow-green tricolour in December 2025 in the midst of the Sudanese civil war (2023–present).

Flag of the Republic of the Sudan 2-3 ratio (1956–1969)

Naval ensign (1956–1970)

Customs ensign (1956–1970)

Colour scheme	Blue	Yellow	Green
CMYK	91-59-0-31	0-3-100-0	100-0-56-42
HEX	#0F47AF	#FFF500	#00923F
RGB	15-71-175	255-245-0	0-146-63

=== Democratic Republic of Sudan (1969–1985) and Republic of Sudan (1985–present) ===
Following a coup d'état in May 1969, the country was renamed the Democratic Republic of Sudan and a competition was held to design a new flag. The winning entry was designed by artist Abdel Rahman Ahmed Al-Jali based on pan-Arab colours and was adopted as the national flag in May 1970.

Whereas there is no fixed order for the Pan-Arab Colours of black, white, red, and green, flags using the Arab Liberation Colours (a subset of the Pan-Arab Colours) maintain a horizontal triband of equal stripes of red, white, and black, with green being used to distinguish the different flags from each other by way of green stars, Arabic script, or, in the case of Sudan, the green triangle along the hoist. In the original Arab Liberation Flag, green was used in the form of the flag of the Kingdom of Egypt and Sudan emblazoned on the breast of the Eagle of Saladin in the middle stripe.

Flag of the Democratic Republic of Sudan (1970–1985)

Standard of the president of the Democratic Republic of Sudan (1970–1985)

Flag of the President of the Sudan (1985–present)

Ensign of the Sudanese Customs Service

Naval ensign (1985–present)

Air Force ensign (1970–present)

=== Design and symbolism ===
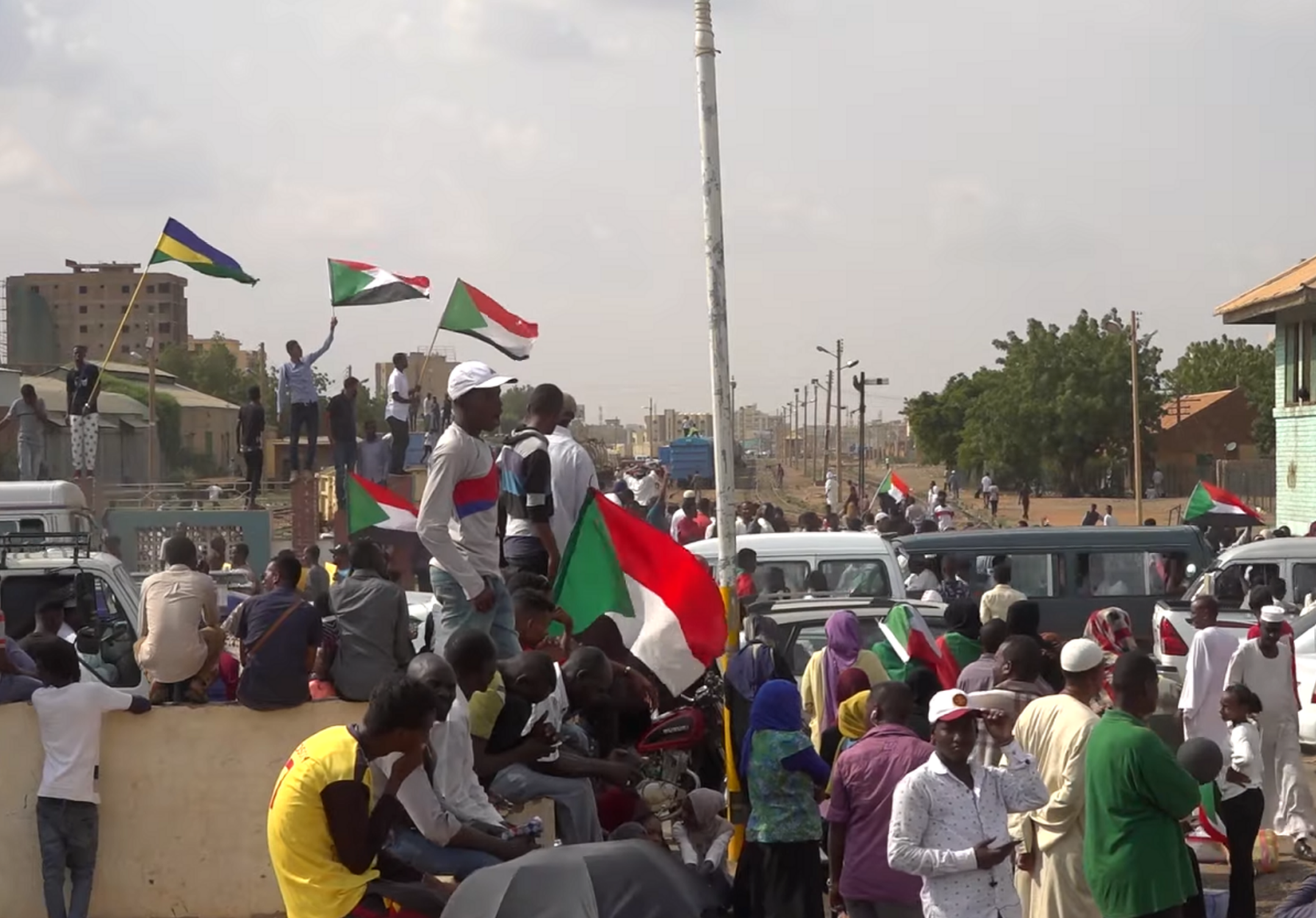
People with flags during the Sudanese revolution (2018–2019)

According to World Flags 101:

Red, white, black and green are called the pan-Arab colours and have been historically linked to the Arab people and Islamic religion for centuries. The colours stand for Arab unity and independence. The red stripe represents Sudan's struggle for independence and many other struggles, and the sacrifices of the country's martyrs. The white represents the people, light and optimism. It also represents the White Flag League which was a nationalist group that rose up against colonial rule in 1924. The black represents Sudan; in Arabic, 'Sudan,' means 'land of the black people.' It also represents the black flag of nationalists who fought colonial rule during the Mahdist Revolution, late in 19th century. Green represents Islam, agriculture and the prosperity of the land.

Construction sheet

Flag construction sheet

=== Colour scheme ===
The specified colours are as follows:

Colour scheme	Green	Red	Black	White
CMYK	100-0-64-55	0-92-75-18	0-0-0-100	0-0-0-0
HEX	#007229	#D21034	#000000	#FFFFFF
RGB	0-114-41	210-16-52	0-0-0	255-255-255

== Sub-national flags ==
The sub-national flags usually consist of the state's emblem displayed on a white or coloured background. Some of the states of Sudan have adopted their own distinctive flags, usually their state emblem on a green or white background.

=== States ===
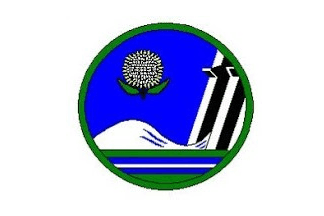
Blue Nile State

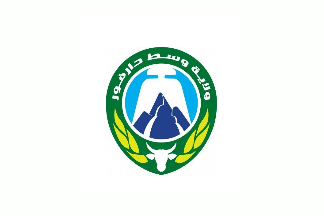
Central Darfur

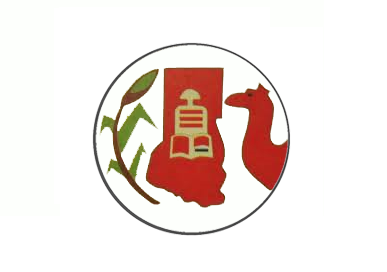
North Darfur

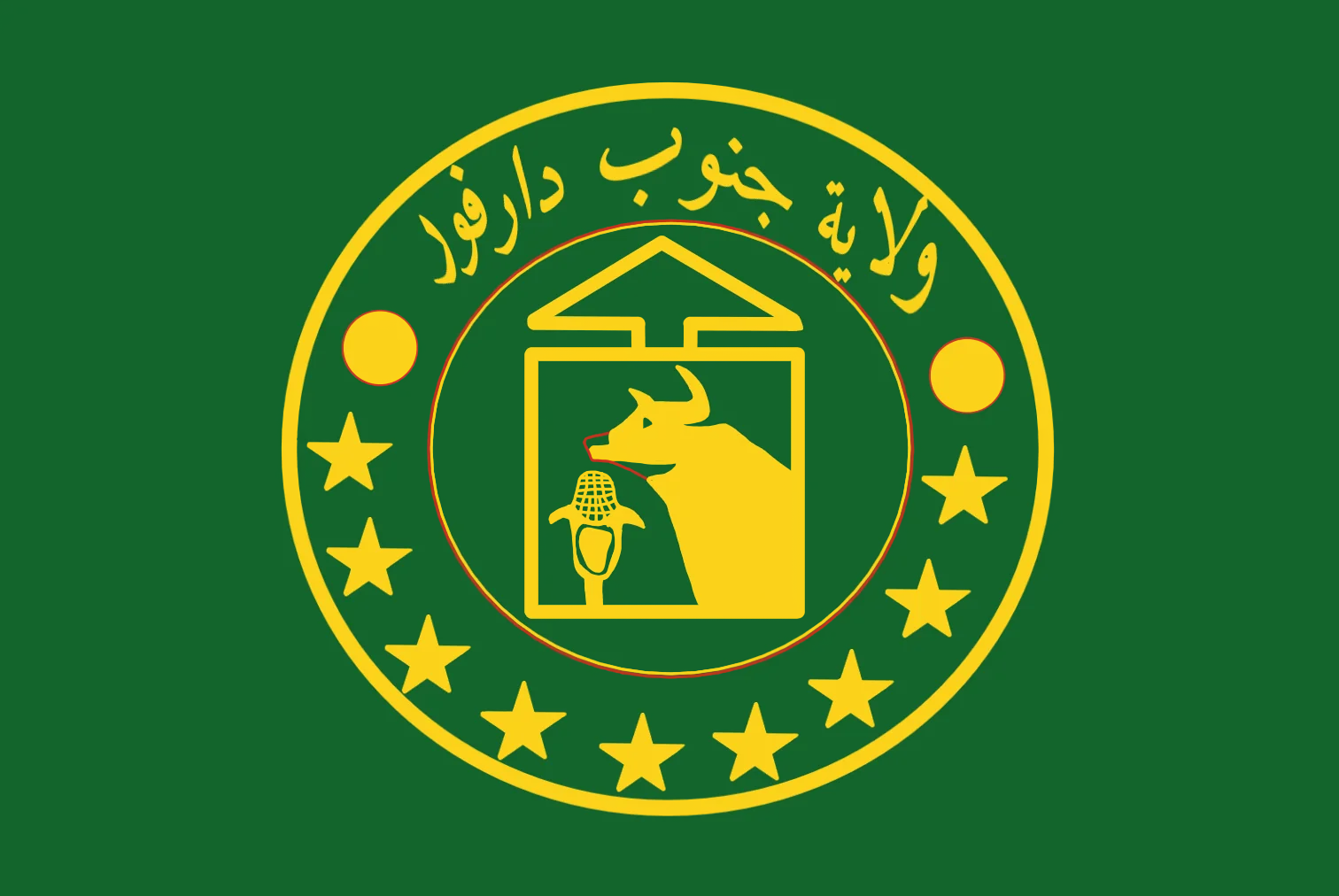
South Darfur

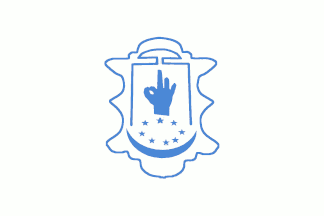
West Darfur

Kassala State

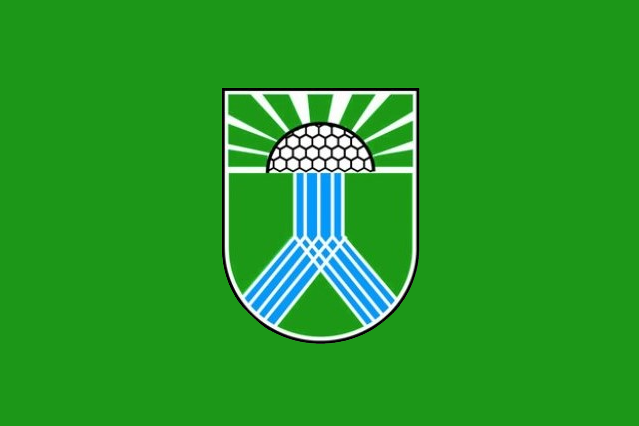
Khartoum State

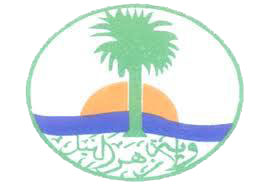
River Nile State

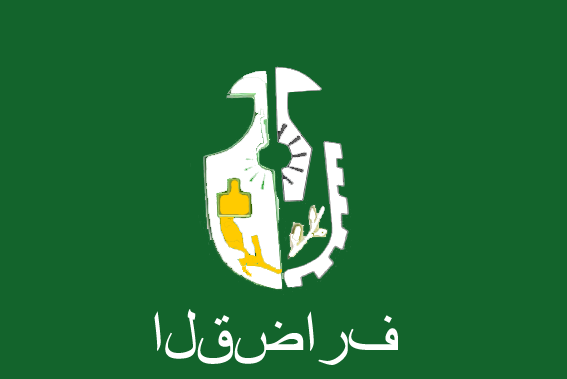
Al Qadarif State

=== Administrative areas ===
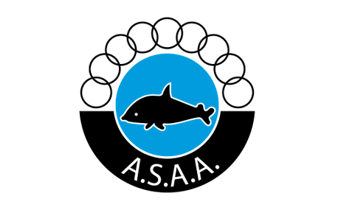
Abyei Area

=== Regions ===
Darfur (Darfur Regional Government)

=== Former provincial flags ===
Kordofan

== See also ==
- List of Sudanese flags
- Emblem of Sudan
- Flag of South Sudan
- Flag of Egypt
- Flag of Iraq
- Flag of Yemen
