= Sledmere House =

Grade I listed Georgian country house

Coordinates: 54.069535°N 0.579000°W

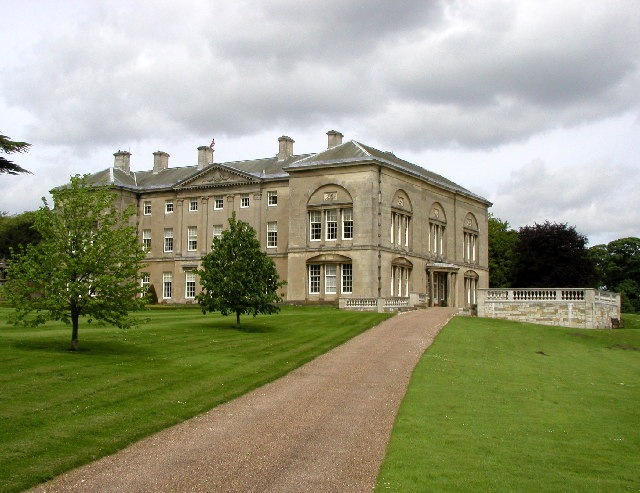
Sledmere House, looking northwards

Sledmere House is a Grade I listed Georgian country house, containing Chippendale, Sheraton and French furnishings and many fine pictures, set within a park designed by Capability Brown. It is the ancestral home of the Sykes family and is located in the village of Sledmere, between Driffield and Malton, in the East Riding of Yorkshire, England. The present house was begun in 1751, extended in the 1790s, and rebuilt after a fire in 1911. It was once the home of Colonel Sir Mark Sykes, 6th Baronet, noted English traveller and diplomatic advisor, and is now the home of Sir Tatton Sykes, 8th Baronet.

The house is built in Nottinghamshire ashlar on three storeys to an H-shaped plan.

== History ==
William Sykes (1500–1577) migrated from Cumberland to the West Riding of Yorkshire, where he and his son became wealthy cloth traders. Daniel Sykes (b.1632) was the first member of the family to begin trading in Hull and made a fortune from shipping and finance. Richard Sykes (1678–1726) concentrated on the flourishing Baltic trade in pig iron and the wealth of the family was built on this in the first half of the eighteenth century. His son Sir Richard Sykes (1706–1761) married Mary Kirkby, sister of Mark Kirby, and heiress to the Sledmere estate.

In 1751, Sir Richard Sykes demolished the previous Manor House at Sledmere, which had existed since medieval times, and built a new mansion. He also planted some 20,000 trees on the Wolds about his new home. He left no male heir however and on his death the estate passed to his brother Mark Sykes (1711–1783). Sir Mark's son, Sir Christopher Sykes, 2nd Baronet (1749–1801), MP for Beverley, greatly expanded the estate. He and his wife bought and enclosed huge areas of land for cultivation, built two new wings to the house, and landscaped the grounds, planting 2,500 acres (10 km^{2}) of trees. The entire village of Sledmere was moved. Sir Christopher left a vast estate of nearly 30,000 acres (120 km^{2}) and a large mansion set in its own 200 acres (0.8 km^{2}) of parkland, which survives in the family to the present day. Sir Christopher also employed Joseph Rose, the most celebrated plasterer of his day, to decorate Sledmere. The result has been called among the finest plaster-work in England.

A catastrophic fire in 1911 left the building a shell and destroyed the Adam-style 1790s interiors. It is said that Sir Tatton Sykes, 5th Baronet, was too busy eating one of the milk puddings - to which he was addicted - to pay much attention, but villagers and estate workers loyally rescued pictures, statues and furniture, china and carpets, and even doors and banisters, including the house's 1780 copy of the Apollo Belvedere. The roof fell in a few moments later. The original designs for the interiors had survived however, and the house was then restored. Sir Mark Sykes, 6th Baronet, inherited the estate after his father.

Nowadays, land tied to this manor is used as the festival site for Tribfest, a music festival featuring tribute bands of many famous artists from around the world, alive or dead. This was started in 2007 and has been hosted at the fields surrounding Sledmere House every year since then, except in 2020 when that year's festival was called off due to the COVID-19 pandemic.

== Features ==
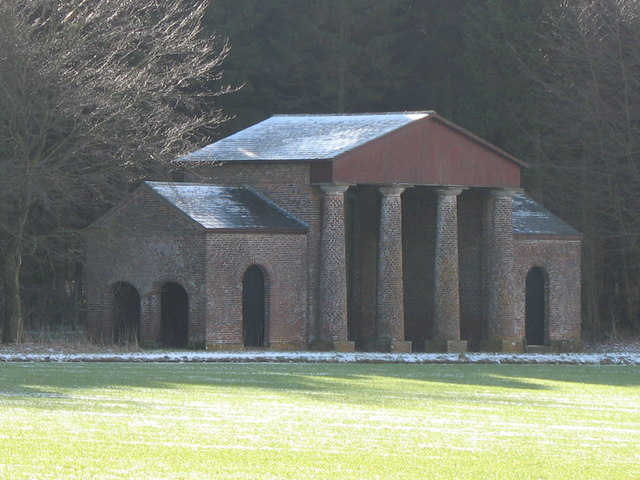
Deer House, Sledmere Park

The Long Library at Sledmere, superbly restored, is one of the most beautiful rooms in England. (Jeremy Musson, writing for Country Life, notes that the library of "Sledmere Park" [sic] may have inspired the 1924 short story "A Neighbour's Landmark" by M. R. James.) The Drawing Room and Music Room were decorated by Joseph Rose. The Music Room contains a fine organ case designed by Samuel Green for the original house in 1751. However, there is nothing behind the facade pipes and the organ is unplayable. The Turkish Room was designed for Sir Mark Sykes, 6th Baronet, by an Armenian artist, David Ohannessian, inspired by one of the sultan's apartments in the Yeni Mosque in Istanbul. The tiles were made in Kutahya, Anatolia in 1913 in Ohannessian's workshop, the Société Ottomane de Faïence. The attached Roman Catholic chapel has a fine ceiling painted by Thomas Errington. It depicts the four winged creatures of the Evangelist in the Chancel and in the Nave, a variety of birds including a mute swan, grey heron, barn swallow and northern lapwing.

Sledmere House is set within a park of 960 acres (3.9 km^{2}) designed in 1777 by Capability Brown and executed by Sir Christopher Sykes, 2nd Baronet. The plan still survives in the house. Its gardens include a paved sculpture court (1911), an 18th-century walled rose garden and a recently laid out knot garden.

Sledmere Monument is a 120 feet (37 m) stone monument along the B1252 road on Garton Hill, built in memory of Sir Tatton Sykes, 4th Baronet, by his friends and neighbours in 1865.

== See also ==
- Grade I listed buildings in the East Riding of Yorkshire
- Listed buildings in Sledmere
- Sykes family of Sledmere
