= Order of the Virtues (Egypt) =

Egyptian order of knighthood for women

Order of the Virtues Nishan al-Kamal
- Type: Order
- Established: 1915
- Sovereign: King Fuad II
- Grand Mistress: Princess Fawzia-Latifa

Precedence
- Next (higher): Royal Order of Muhammad Ali
- Next (lower): Royal Order of the Nile
- Equivalent: Royal Order of Ismail I
- Ribbon bar of the Order

The Royal Order of the Virtues (or Malakiun Nishan al-Kamal) is a dynastic order of knighthood for women of the Egyptian Royal Family which is very rarely awarded by its current sovereign, King Fuad II.

== History ==
The Order was founded in 1915 by King Hussein Kamel I of Egypt to honour women in various fields of society.

== Grades ==
- Dame Grand Cordon, Special Class
- Dame Grand Cordon
- Dame Grand Officer
- Dame Commander
- Dame

Ribbon bars
3rd Class	2nd Class	1st Class	Supreme Class

== Insignia ==
- The ribbon for the sash ribband and bows is light blue with gold edges.
- The breast stars are of five points in two variants, a larger size for the Special Class of the Grand Cordon and a regular size for the Grand Cordon and Grand Officer grades.
- The badge is similar to the regular size of the breast star and is suspended from the Grand Cordon ribband sash as well as bows of four sizes for the different grades.

== Notable recipients ==
- Elisabeth of Bavaria, Queen of Belgium: Supreme Class
- Queen Nazli of Egypt: Supreme Class (1917)
- Queen Farida of Egypt: Supreme Class (1938)
- Princess Fawzia Fuad of Egypt: Supreme Class (1939)
- Empress Tadj ol-Molouk of Iran: Supreme Class (1939)
- Princess Faiza Fuad of Egypt: Supreme Class
- Princess Faika of Egypt: Supreme Class
- Princess Fathia of Egypt: Supreme Class
- Umm Kulthum: Supreme Class (1944)
- Queen Narriman of Egypt: Supreme Class (1951)
- Princess Elizabeth, Duchess of Edinburgh (later Queen Elizabeth II): Special Class (1948)
- Queen Fadila of Egypt (now Princess Fadila Loeb-Picard): Supreme Class
- Princess Fawzia-Latifa of Egypt: Supreme Class
- Princess Noal Zaher of Afghanistan: Supreme Class
- Huda Sha'arawi: Supreme Class

== Order of Virtues ==
Order of Virtues Nishan Kamal
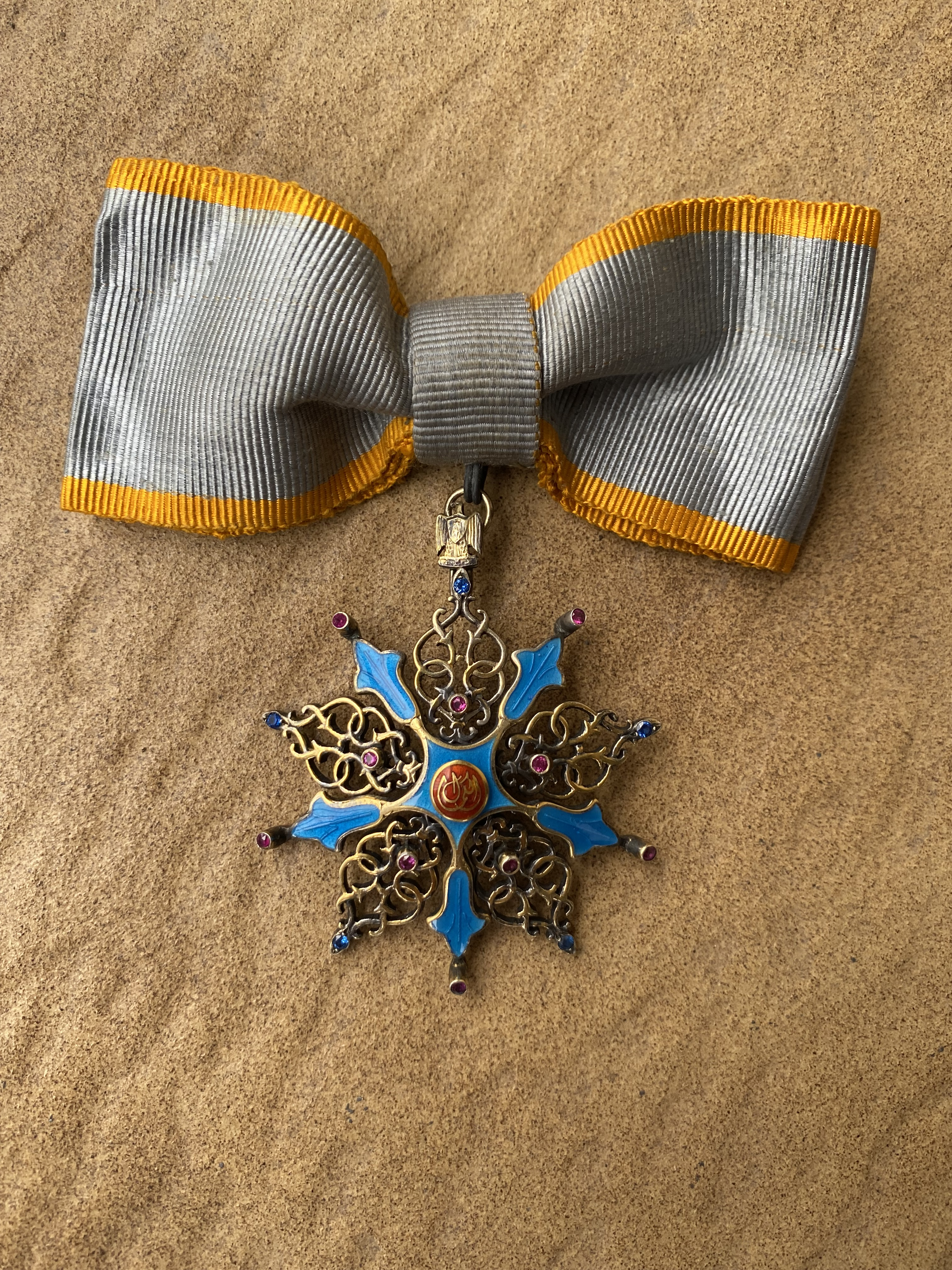
- Third class insignia of the Order of the Virtues.

Awarded by President of Egypt
- Type: Order
- Established: 1953
- Awarded for: To women as an award for merit
- Grades: Grand Cross; Grand Officer; Commander; Officer; Member

Precedence
- Next (higher): Order of Merit
- Next (lower): Order of Labour
- Ribbon bar of the Order

The Order of Virtues (or Nishan Kamal) is an Egyptian national honour awarded to Egyptian and foreign women for merits, service and contributions.

== History ==
The Order was established under the Republic in 1953 by Presidential Decree, using a similar name and insignia of the original honour, the Order of the Virtues.

=== Notable recipients ===
- Siti Hartinah, First Lady of Indonesia (1977)
- Diana, Princess of Wales (1981)
- Queen Sofía of Spain (1997)
- Infanta Cristina of Spain (2000)
- Queen Mary of Denmark (2024)
- Princess Benedikte, Dowager Princess of Sayn-Wittgenstein-Burleburg (2024)
- Princess Marie, Princess Joachim of Denmark (2024)
- Queen Aishwarya of Nepal (1974)
- Queen Mariam of Brunei (now Princess Mariam Abdul Aziz) (1984)
- Queen Noor of Jordan (1989)
- Queen Letizia of Spain (2025)

== See also ==
- Orders, decorations, and medals of Egypt

== References and sources ==
- World Medals Index, Republic of Egypt: The Order of the Virtues
