= Order of Ismail =

Royal Order of Ismail
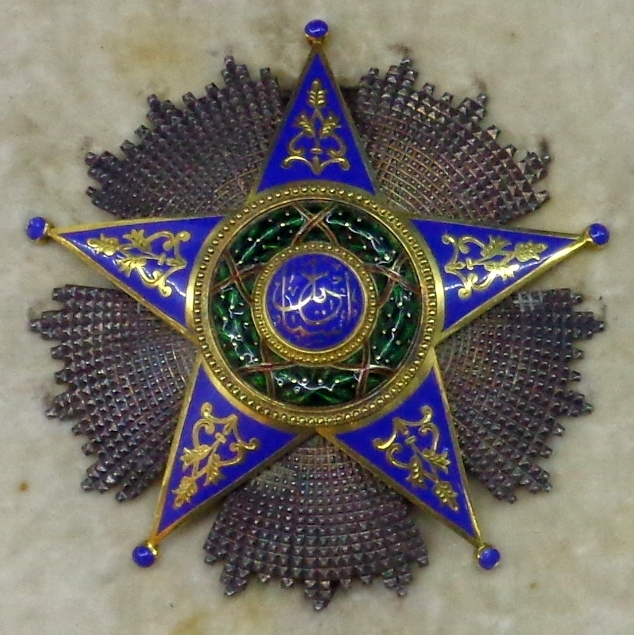
- Star of the Order

Awarded by Head of the Egyptian Royal Family
- Type: Dynastic order
- Established: 14 April 1915
- Royal house: Muhammad Ali
- Religious affiliation: Islam
- Ribbon: Dark Blue with two Red stripes on the edges
- Founder: Sultan Hussein Kamel
- Sovereign: King Fuad II
- Grand Master: Prince Muhammad Ali
- Grades: Knight Grand Cordon
- Former grades: Knight Grand Officer; Knight Commander; Knight

Precedence
- Next (higher): Royal Order of Muhammad Ali
- Next (lower): Royal Order of the Nile; Royal Order of the Virtues
- Ribbon bar of the order

The Royal Order of Ismail (Nishan al-Ismail) was an order of chivalry and state honour in the Kingdom of Egypt.

== History ==
It was established on 14 April 1915 by Sultan Hussein Kamel of Egypt to reward eminent services to the state. The order was named after Ismail Pasha and could be awarded to both Egyptian nationals and foreigners. It was awarded in four classes:

1. Grand Cordon of the Order of Ismail (limited to thirty recipients)
2. Grand Officer of the Order of Ismail (limited to seventy five recipients)
3. Commander of the Order of Ismail (limited to one hundred and fifty recipients)
4. Officer of the Order of Ismail (limited to three hundred recipients)
5. Chevalier (knight) of the Order of Ismail

The Order became obsolete following the establishment of the Republic of Egypt in 1953.

== Recipients ==
- Quintin Brand
- Dwight D. Eisenhower
- Alexander Granville
- Michael Hansson
- Muhammad Hasan
- Kigeli V of Rwanda
- Hussein Refki Pasha
- Oswald Longstaff Prowde
- Owana Salazar
- Ahmed Ali Pasha
