= Order of Muhammad Ali =

Royal Order of Muhammad Ali
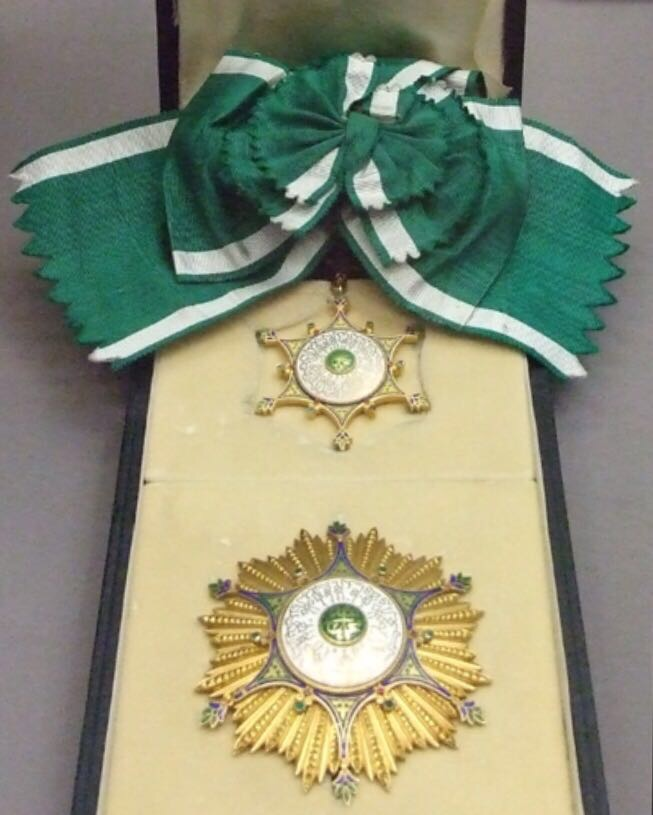
- Grand Cordon set of the Order

Awarded by Head of the Egyptian Royal Family
- Type: Dynastic order
- Established: 14 April 1915
- Royal house: Muhammad Ali
- Religious affiliation: Islam
- Ribbon: Green with two White stripes on either side
- Founder: Sultan Hussein Kamel
- Sovereign: King Fuad II
- Grand Master: Prince Muhammad Ali
- Grades: Collar; Grand Cordon
- Former grades: Commander

Precedence
- Next (higher): None (Highest)
- Next (lower): Royal Order of Ismail
- Ribbon bar of the order

The Royal Order of Muhammad Ali (Nishan al-Muhammad'Ali) was an order of chivalry and state honour in the Kingdom of Egypt.

== History ==
The Order of Muhammad Ali was founded by Sultan Hussein Kamel to commemorate the Muhammad Ali dynasty on 14 April 1915. It was discontinued on formation of the Arab Republic of Egypt on 18 June 1953.

This order was the first in rank among the Orders of the Kingdom of Egypt. It consisted of a "Collar" and a single class, the "Grand Cordon". It also included two Medals, one in gold, the other in silver.

- "The Collar" was reserved for His Majesty the King, who may confer it on Members of His Family, Heads of State, Sovereigns and Princes Regnant and Members of their families;
- "The Grand Cordon" could only be conferred for very special merit or for exceptional services to the Country. The Grand Cordons wore a plaque on the left side of the chest and, as a sash, from right to left, a broad green moiré ribbon edged with white, with the decoration of the Order attached to the end. The number of Grand Cordons was fixed at fifteen, excluding members of the Royal Family and foreigners who were not officials of the Egyptian State. The Grand Cordons residing in Egypt received their insignia from His Majesty the King. They were also given a patent bearing the Royal Seals. Grand Cordons received military honours on their death.
- "The Medals of the Order of Mohamed Ali", "in gold and silver", were intended solely to reward brilliant actions accomplished by soldiers and sailors without distinction of rank or grade. The medal was worn on the left side of the chest suspended by a ribbon in the colours of the Order. After the death of the holder, the medals and certificates remained the property of his family.
