= King Fuad =

King Fuad (Arabic: الملك فؤاد), also spelled King Fouad, may refer to two different Kings of Egypt:

- Fuad I of Egypt (1868–1936)
- Fuad II of Egypt (born in 1952)
