= Noal Zaher =

Princess Noal
- Princess of the Sa'id
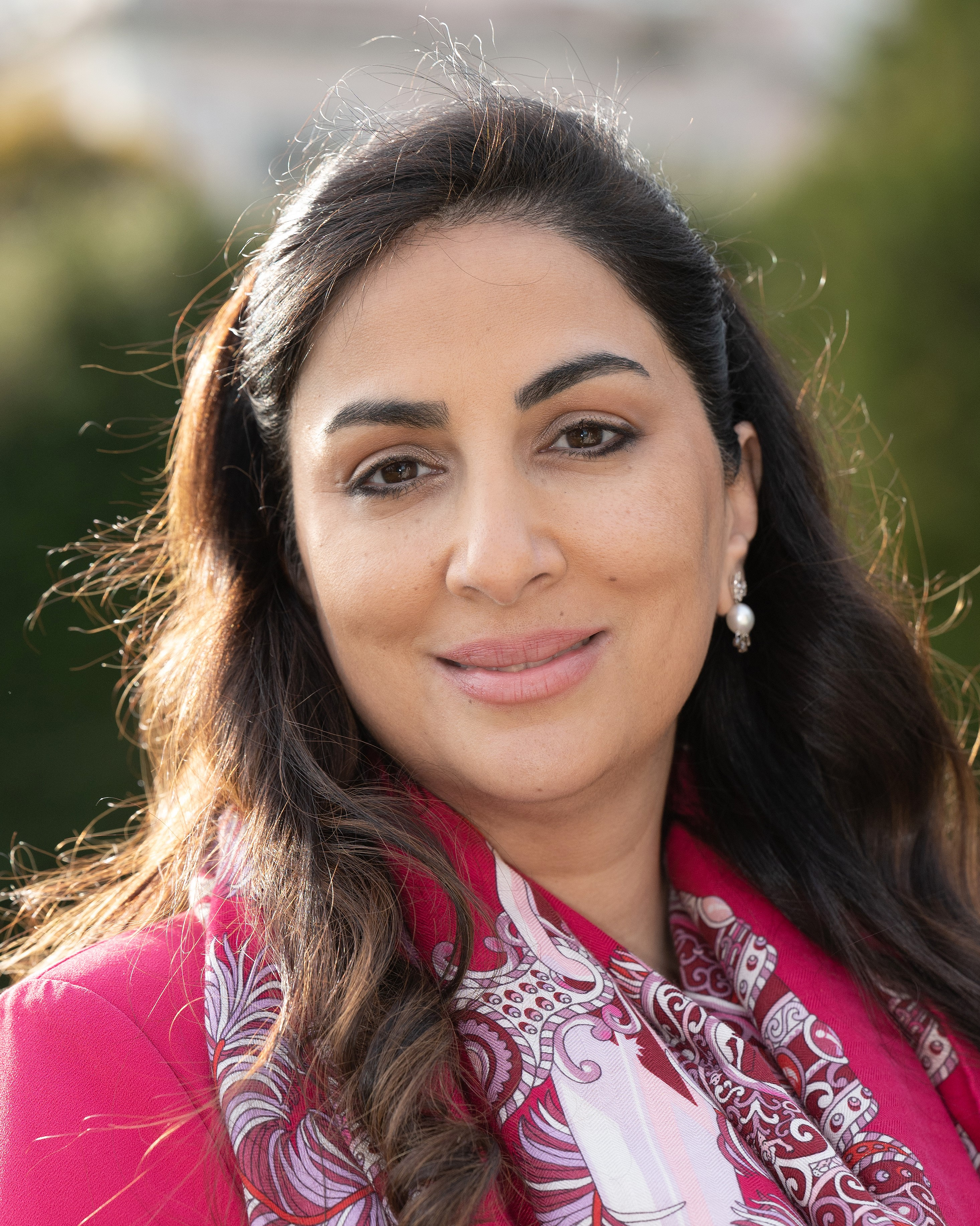
- Born: 6 December 1980 (age 45); Rome, Italy
- Spouse: Muhammad Ali, Prince of the Sa'id (m. 2013)
- Issue: Prince Fouad Zaher Hassan; Princess Farah-Noor
- Dynasty: Barakzai
- Father: Prince Muhammad Daoud Pashtunyar Khan of Afghanistan
- Mother: Fatima Aref Zaher
- Religion: Islam

Noal Zaher is an Afghan designer and the wife of Mohamed Ali Farouk, the heir apparent to the abolished thrones of Egypt and Sudan and daughter of Prince Muhammad Daoud Pashtunyar Khan, who is the fifth son of King Zahir Shah of Afghanistan.

== Background ==
Princess Noal was born in Rome, Italy, on 6 December 1980. She attended L’Institut Saint Dominique in Rome, Italy, where she majored in Euro-business, then undertook lapidary studies at Webster University in London. She founded and became directing designer for Noal & Co Ltd in 2001.

She is fluent in Italian, French and English.

Her father Prince Muhammad Daoud Pashtunyar Khan (born on 17 April 1949) was educated at Esteqlal High School, and Military Academy, Kabul. She was commissioned in the Royal Afghan Air Force as 2nd-Lieutenant, later became a civil aviation pilot.

Her mother Princess Fatima Begum [née Fatima Aref Zaher] (born on 2 May 1949), was the First Secretary (Protocol, Financial Affairs and Public Relations) at the Afghan Embassy in Rome since 2005, and later served as Afghan Chargé d'affaires in Rome since 2007. She is a daughter of General Sardar Muhammad Aref Khan, a former Afghan Ambassador to the USSR by his wife, Amina Begum (eldest daughter of Brigadier Sardar Muhammad Ali Khan by his wife, Humaira Begum).

She has an older brother, Prince Doran Daoud Zaher Shah (born in 1974), and educated at American University of Sharjah (AUS), and a Consultant of GTZ Investments in Sharjah.

=== Marriage and family ===
Living in Istanbul, Princess Noal attended the wedding on 20 April 2012 of Prince Rudolf of Liechtenstein with Tılsım Tanberk, where she met Mohamed Ali Farouk, the elder son of Fuad II (last King of Egypt), the couple's betrothal was announced on 27 April 2013.

Their wedding was held on 30 August 2013 at Istanbul's former Çırağan Palace in the presence of King Fuad II, the bride's parents, media, a crowd of onlookers and guests, including the couple from the reigning European dynasty which introduced them.

On 12 January 2017 the couple had twins, a son and daughter:

- Prince Fouad Zaher Hassan of Egypt. His names were chosen in honor of his grandfather, King Fouad II of Egypt, his great-grandfather, King Zaher Shah of Afghanistan, and King Hassan II of Morocco.
- Princess Farah-Noor of Egypt.

== Honours ==
- Decoration of Al Kemal in brilliants.
