= Farouk Corner Museum =

Coordinates: 29°50′49″N 31°17′41″E

- Established: 1941
- Location: Helwan, Cairo Governorate
- Type: Historic museum

The Farouk Corner Museum or the Royal Rest House of King Farouk is located in Helwan, about 30 km from Cairo, Egypt. The total area of the building and garden is approximately 11,600 square meters. The museum was built between 1941 and 1942 and was inaugurated by King Farouk on 5 September 1942.

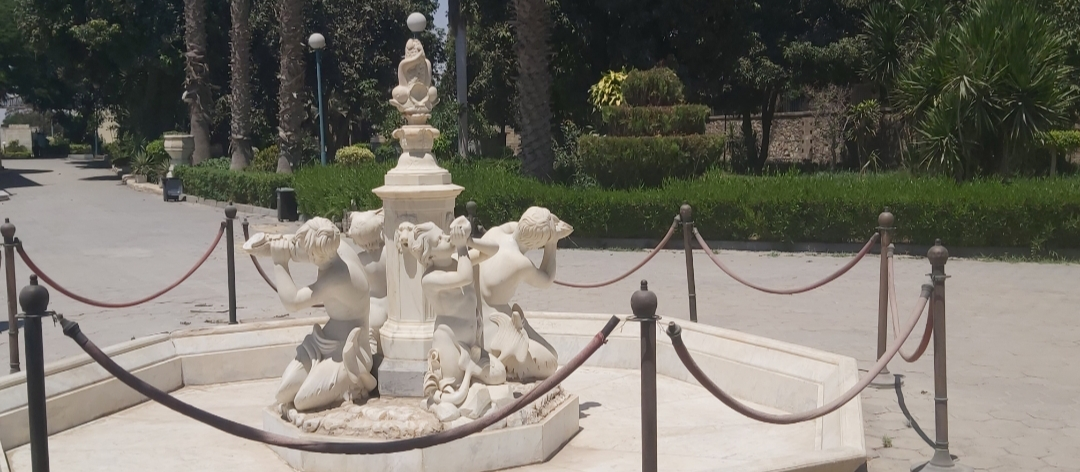
Farouk Corner Museum

Previously, Farouk Corner was known as a winter rest house for King Farouk, which later became a historical museum showcasing some of the belongings of the Alawiyya family in Egypt.

== Location ==
The Farouk Corner Museum is situated directly on the Nile about 6 km west of Helwan in the southern part of Cairo Governorate. The location was initially selected in 1916 by Italian architect Arsan Giovann to build a private space for tea and relaxation. The area initially belonged to the Grand Hotel until it was purchased in 1932 by wealthy Egyptian Mohamed Bey Hafiz. In 1935, King Farouk visited the place, liked it, and decided to buy it due to its reputation for tranquility, clean air, and the nearby sulfur water that many sought for its healing properties. He bought it for 2,000 Egyptian pounds and commissioned the then-Minister of Public Works, Mustafa Fahmy Pasha, to construct the royal rest house, later known as Farouk Corner. Construction began in 1941, and King Farouk inaugurated it on 5 September 1942.

== Architectural design ==
The corner is a royal rest house designed externally in the shape of a boat docked on the shore of the Nile. Iron columns on the roof held curtains, giving the appearance of sails, and stone terraces on the riverbank served as seating areas for enjoying the Nile view, fishing, and leisure. The river dock was designed to receive yachts and large boats. The rest house's garden features a wooden pergola adorned with vases, limestone flower beds, and 33 rare mango trees brought to Egyptian royal palaces from Albania.

The interior of the corner consists of three floors in a modern style:

- The ground floor (basement): This floor has a large gate at the back of the palace, housing the kitchen, servant accommodations, and facilities. At the museum entrance stands a life-sized bronze statue on a marble base of a woman in a pharaonic costume, wearing a serpent crown and playing a harp, known as the Lady of the Harp. There is also a Sphinx statue in bronze, a golden-plated metal desk clock, the throne chair of Egypt, a winter fireplace, and a peacock statue. Opposite is the king's dining table from the Heliopolis Rest House, decorated with intricate carvings, and nearby is a panel depicting ancient Egyptian marriage ceremonies.
- The first floor: The main floor of the rest house. At its front is a marble staircase leading to an outer hall, which opens into an inner hall and further into two dining rooms, a smoking room, a balcony overlooking the Nile, and eastern and western terraces for tea.

The first floor includes three bedrooms: one for Queen Narriman, King Farouk's second wife, containing her bed, mirror, and a photo of her and Farouk on their wedding day, along with a small bed for Crown Prince Ahmed Fuad. A notable feature is a collection of 379 dolls gifted to the former queens of Egypt, Farida and Narriman, from 33 countries, each dressed in unique attire. Next to Queen Narriman's room is King Farouk's private bathroom, containing his personal items like cotton, soap, a razor, and nail clippers. Adjacent is the king's bedroom, paneled in mahogany with an oil painting of him at age 12, and a third bedroom for Princess Fawzia, Farouk's sister. There is also a sunroom on this floor, where the king would sunbathe, relax, and get massages.

- The second floor houses renowned paintings by famous artists of the time, including a painting of Old Cairo by Ikoheman, and the "Egyptian Peasant and the Jug," an antimony statue by French artist Charles Cordier dating back to 1866. A painting of Ayat al-Kursi, written in gold, was gifted by a Helwan resident to King Farouk at the rest house's opening in 1942; it serves as the establishment's founding plaque. The floor also contains the gilded throne chair and the crown prince's chair, replicas of King Tutankhamun's throne, along with statues of the Black and White Torchbearers symbolizing the Kingdom of Egypt and Sudan. The second-floor balcony is decorated with replicas of the Luxor and Karnak temples, brought from King Farouk's rest house at the Pyramids.

Another painting on this floor shows the Kaaba cover procession passing in front of the pyramids. In the ground floor's five balconies overlooking the Nile, there are deer-skin chairs embossed with King Farouk's name in hieroglyphs, and a statue representing the Egyptian and Sudanese women, symbolizing the unity of Egypt and Sudan as a single kingdom at the time.

- The rooftop (final floor) is a spacious terrace offering a wide view of the Nile, designed for the king to overlook the city of Helwan.

== Key artifacts ==
- The museum's display includes a valuable collection of royal items, such as furniture, antiques, statues, and paintings, totaling around 637 artifacts. King Farouk took care to furnish his rest house with luxurious and high-quality items to emulate the possessions of kings.
- Most of the museum's artifacts are replicas of ancient Egyptian relics displayed in the Egyptian Museum, and many pieces come from the Heliopolis Rest House.
- Among the most prized items is a clock given by the former King of England to Khedive Ismail. Queen Eugenie gifted this clock to Ismail Pasha to celebrate the opening of the Suez Canal, and it eventually came into King Farouk's possession.
- The museum also contains a gold-plated metal desk clock, featuring a crystal panel with 12 ancient stones, gold hands, and decorative golden crocodile statues on the crystal.
- A bonbonnière made of pure silver weighing 11 kilograms, rare statues, exquisite bronze paintings, and a collection of vases are also present.
- An antique radio equipped with a record player, housed in a Turkish walnut box styled as a temple, decorated with columns sculpted with lotus flower capitals, engraved with King Farouk's name in Egyptian hieroglyphs.
- Treasures of the young pharaoh Tutankhamun are displayed, along with other ancient Egyptian artifacts. Additionally, items from the king's rest house at the Great Pyramid, previously stored in the Manial Museum in Cairo, are exhibited here.
- An artwork depicts the religious procession of the mahmal carrying the Kaaba cover through the streets of Old Cairo, where the cover was once crafted, on its journey to Mecca.

== Farouk's rest house today ==
The rest house remained King Farouk's private residence until the July 23, 1952, revolution. After Farouk left Egypt, the rest house was nationalized and, in 1976, transferred to the museum sector of the Supreme Council of Antiquities under antiquities law, which protects it from encroachment. It was subsequently listed among historical sites and museums.

After its conversion to a public museum, the site opened and closed multiple times for various reasons, the last of which was due to the 2011 security crisis. The museum reopened in August 2016 after conditions stabilized.

Finally, it is worth noting that the area of Helwan, where the rest house is located, was referred to as the "City of the Pashas". This designation for Helwan began with the discovery of several tombs belonging to princes and high-ranking officials from the Pharaonic era, alongside the graves of some ordinary citizens, dating back to the First and Second Dynasties.
