= Customs of ancient Egypt =

The customs of ancient Egypt, the daily routine of the population, the cities, the crafts, and the economy derive their importance from agriculture, its needs, and its benefits. Herodotus emphasized that Egypt is the gift of the Nile and that the Nile River is the source of all aspects of life, including the religion of the ancient Egyptians and Pharaonic mythology. The Neolithic revolution occurred on the banks of the Nile River through the breeding of domesticated animals.

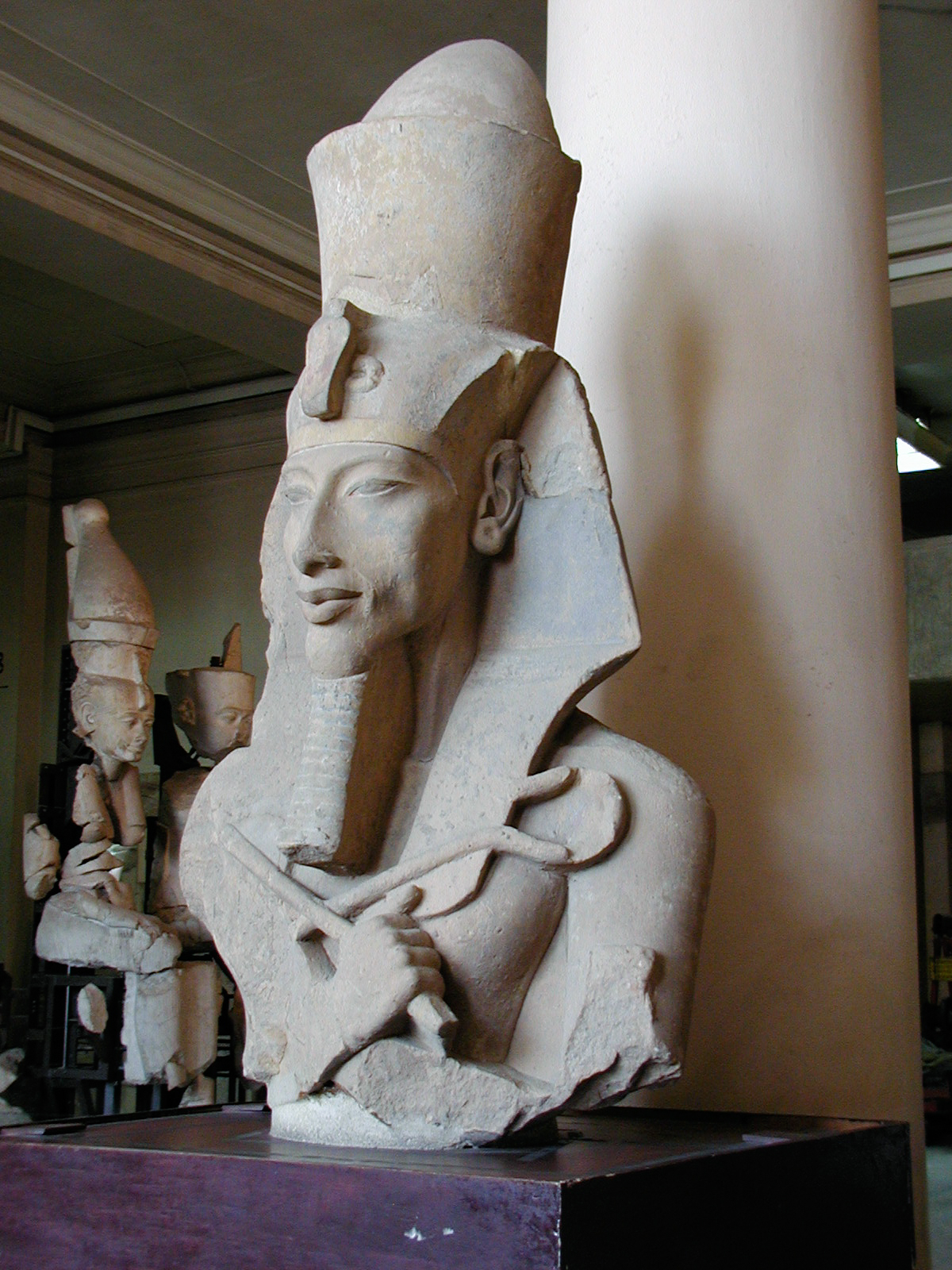
Pharaoh Akhenaten with two crowns

== State regulation ==
The fact that the Pharaoh is the embodiment of the god Horus on earth led to absolute rule over the rest of humanity since pre-dynastic times.

== Religion ==
The gods at that time were incarnated in human form, despite the intervention of some other elements taken from animals, in order to represent the power and authority of the god. Followed by family relationships, which are considered extremely important to Egyptians, and are grouped into family triads. This way they were easy to remember and recognize.

== Mummification ==
The Egyptians mummified the pharaohs using a number of materials, including tar, which helped preserve the bodies for a long time.

== Economy ==
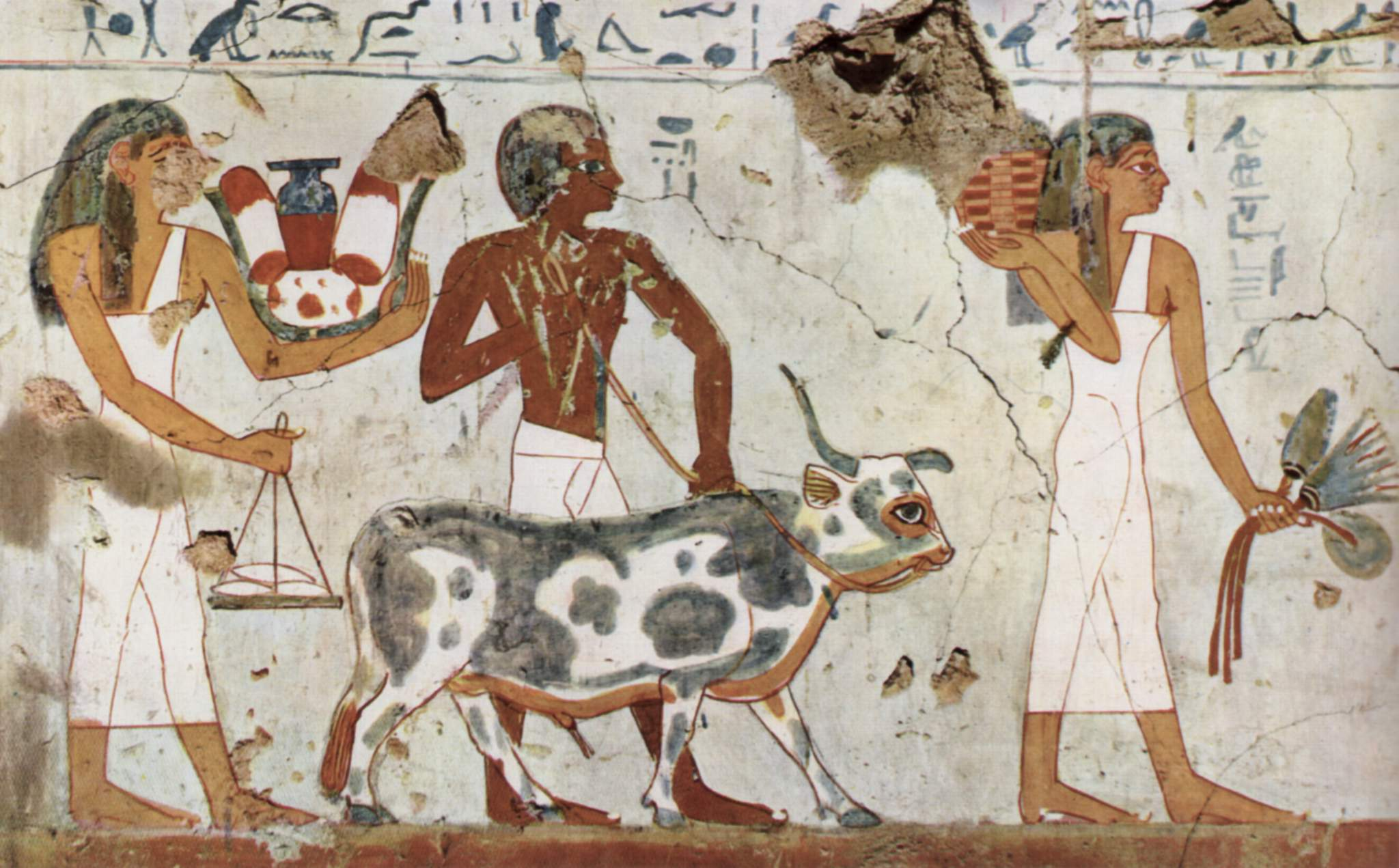
Delivering taxes

The economy of ancient Egypt was totally intervened. The State controlled agriculture, owned the mines, distributed food, collected taxes and controlled foreign trade. Wealth came from agricultural surpluses.As soon as the harvest was collected, the products and heads of livestock “collected” as taxes were taken to the silos of the respective organizations, which acted as the centers of the entire Egyptian organization. These storage infrastructures were of vital importance since they served to preserve surpluses during the flood season.

== Agriculture ==
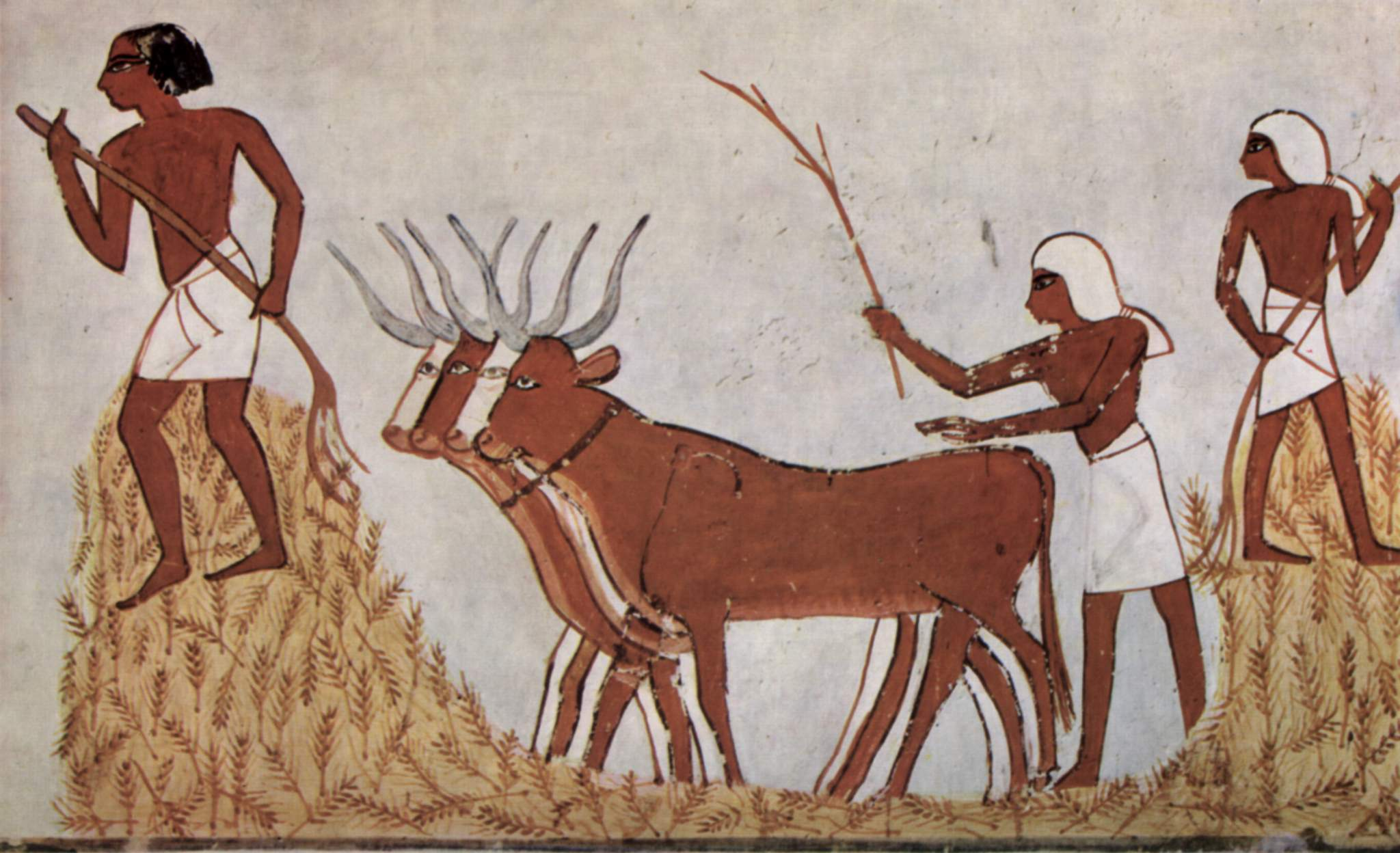
Harvesting tasks

The first canals date back to 3500 BC, and in 1830 BC the first irrigation system was established in Lower Egypt, which would guarantee water reserves in the future to allow for crops in the dry season.

The land was originally royal property, but successive royal donations led to a Latifundium system in which plots were leased to different families. Normally, the contracts were annual and were renewed if there was no breach, so that they were inherited by the children. This economic stability meant that the conditions did not change for 3000 years: No matter the harvest was good or bad, the landlord or the pharaoh's tax collector had to be given 7 or 8 khar (86 litres of grain) for each arura (0.25 hectare).

== Army ==
The first regular army in the world was established in Egypt, founded around the year 3200 BC. This was after King Menes unified Egypt. Before that year, each Egyptian region had its own army to protect it, but after the Egyptian War of Unification, Egypt had a unified army under the command of the King of Egypt.The Egyptian army was the strongest army in the world, and thanks to it, the Egyptians created the first empire in the world, which was the Egyptian Empire.
