= Flags of regions of Egypt =

Symbols

This list of flags of regions of Egypt shows the flags of the 27 governorates of Egypt.

== Flags ==
| Flag | Administrative division | Adopted | Description |
|---|---|---|---|
| | Alexandria | 2014–present | |
| | Aswan | 2016–present | |
| | Asyut | 2016–present | |
| | Beheira | 2010–present | |
| | Beni Suef | 2016–present | |
| | Cairo | 2007–present | |
| | Dakahlia | 2006–present | |
| | Damietta | | |
| | Faiyum | 2011–present | |
| | Gharbia | 2010–present | |
| | Giza | 2016–present | |
| | Ismailia | ?–present | |
| | Kafr el-Sheikh | 2010–present | |
| | Luxor | 2003–present (officially in 2007) | |
| | Matrouh | 2016–present | |
| | Minya | | |
| | Monufia | | |
| | New Valley | 2016–present | |
| | North Sinai | 2016–present | |
| | Port Said | 2011–present | |
| | Qalyubia | | |
| | Qena | 2016–present | |
| | Red Sea | 2006–present | |
| | Sharqia | 2010–present | |
| | Sohag | | |
| | South Sinai | | |
| | Suez | 2006–present | |

== Historical ==
Old Flag of Alexandria (1952-2010)

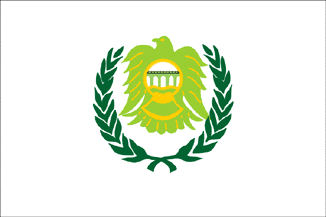
Old Flag of Asyut Governorate (?-2016)

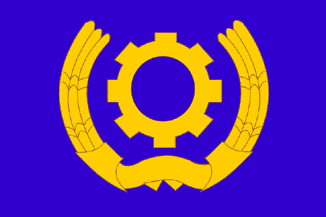
Old Flag of Beheira Governorate (?-2010)

Old Flag of Beni Suef Governorate (2006-2016)

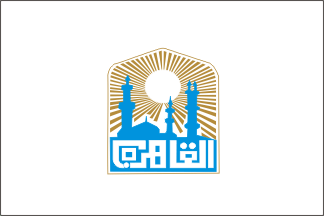
Old Flag of Cairo Governorate (1952-2009)

Old Flag of Cairo Governorate (2009-2012)

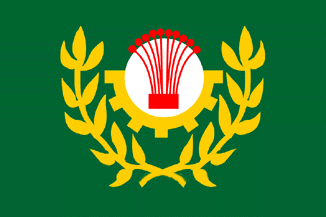
Old Flag of Dakahlia Governorate (?-2006)

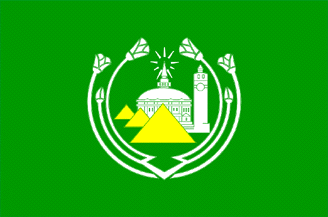
Old Flag of Giza Governorate (2006-2016)

Old Flag of Gharbia Governorate (1960-2016)

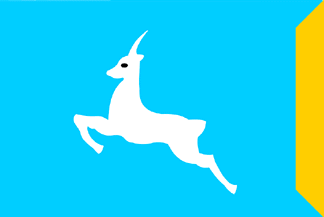
Old Flag of Matrouh Governorate (2006-2016)

Old Flag of New Valley Governorate (2006-2016)

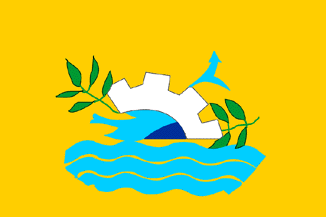
Old Flag of North Sinai Governorate (2006-2016)

Old Flag of Port Said Governorate (2006-2011)

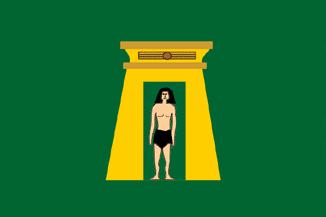
Old Flag of Qena Governorate (2006-2013)

Old Flag of Qena Governorate (2013-2016)

== See also ==
- Flag of Egypt
- List of Egyptian flags
