= Mohamed Ali Farouk =

Egyptian businessman (born 1979)

Prince Muhammad Ali
- Prince of the Sa'id
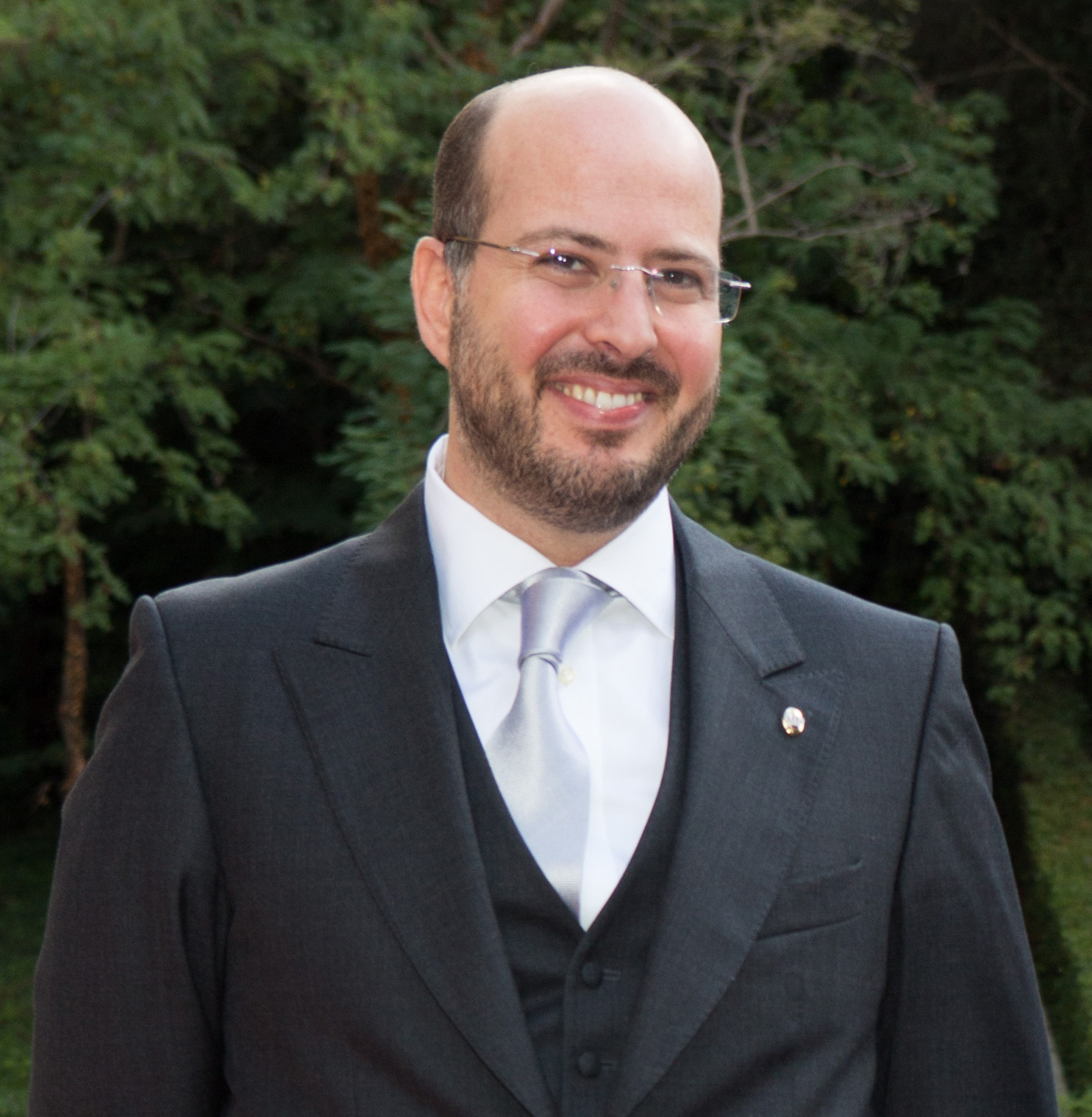
- Farouk in 2017
- Born: 5 February 1979 (age 47); Cairo, Egypt
- Spouse: Noal Zaher (m. 2013)
- Issue: Prince Fouad Zaher Hassan; Princess Farah-Noor
- House: Alawiyya
- Father: Fuad II of Egypt
- Mother: Dominique-France Loeb-Picard
- Religion: Islam

Mohamed Ali Farouk, also known as Prince Mohamed Ali (Arabic: الأمير محمد على، أمير الصعيد [mæˈħæm.mæd ˈʕæli]; born 5 February 1979), is the heir to the headship of the Muhammad Ali dynasty, Egypt’s former royal house and an Egyptian businessman. He is the elder son of Fuad II, the last king of Egypt.

== Early life and education ==
Mohamed Ali Farouk was born on 5 February 1979 in Cairo, Egypt. He is the elder son of Fuad II and his former wife, Fadila (née Dominique-France Loeb-Picard). Mohamed Ali is the grandson of King Farouk and Queen Narriman.

He has a sister, Fawzia Latifa, born in Monaco on 12 February 1982, and a brother, Fakhruddin, born in Rabat, Morocco, on 25 August 1987.

His family was living in exile. At Fuad II’s request, President Anwar Sadat permitted the birth in Cairo following intervention by King Hassan II of Morocco.

He was raised and educated between Europe and Morocco, and attended Institut Le Rosey in Switzerland.

== Career and residence in Egypt ==
Mohamed Ali pursued a career in real estate in Paris.

By September 2024, he was living in Cairo with his wife and children.

In a March 2025 interview with Agence France-Presse, he said that he continued to run his Paris-based property consultancy remotely and that he had no political ambitions. He attributed the move partly to his wife’s encouragement and the greater flexibility offered by remote working.

== Cultural activities ==
In a 2022 interview with Revue Dynastie, Mohamed Ali said that his family sought to preserve Egypt’s historical memory and did not seek a return to power. He also intends to establish a foundation devoted to preserving and transmitting the historical and cultural heritage of Egypt’s former royal family.

== Marriage and children ==
While on holiday in Istanbul, Mohamed Ali attended the wedding of Prince Rudolf of Liechtenstein and Tılsım Tanberk on 20 April 2012. There, he met Princess Noal of Afghanistan, daughter of Prince Muhammed Daoud Pashtunyar Khan and granddaughter of King Zahir Shah of Afghanistan. The couple's betrothal was announced on 27 April 2013.

Their wedding was held on 30 August 2013, at Istanbul's former Çırağan Palace, in the presence of Fuad II. Members of both families and their friends attended the wedding and festivities, and representatives from European and Middle Eastern royal families as well as many Egyptian dignitaries were also invited.

The couple have twins, a son, Fouad Zaher Hassan, and a daughter, Farah-Noor, born on 12 January 2017. In a 2024 interview with GstaadLife, Mohamed Ali explained that Fouad and Zaher, two of his son’s names, are the names of his grandfather, King Fouad II of Egypt, and his great-grandfather, King Zaher Shah of Afghanistan. Hassan honours King Hassan II of Morocco. Farah-Noor means “joy and light”.

Mohamed Ali Farouk Muhammad Ali Dynasty Born: 5 February 1979
Titles in pretence
Vacant Title last held by Ahmad Fuad, Prince of the Sa'id later became King Fuad II	— TITULAR — Prince of the Sa'id since 5 February 1979; Reason for succession failure: Abolition of the monarchy in 1953	Incumbent; Heir apparent: Prince Fouad Zaher Hassan
