= Prince Imperial =

Prince Imperial may refer to the Crown Prince in the following monarchies:

- Prince Imperial of Brazil
- Prince Imperial of France, especially:
  - Napoléon, Prince Imperial
- Prince Imperial of Mexico

== See also ==
- Prince Imperial Memorial, a memorial cross built on the site of the death of Napoleon, Prince Imperial in South Africa
- Prince Royal (disambiguation), a similar style denoting the heirs apparent to certain other monarchies
- Railway of the Prince Imperial, the first documented model railway in the world
