= Prince Royal =

Prince Royal may refer to the Crown Prince in the case of the following monarchies:-

- Prince Royal of Portugal, the Prince Royal of the Kingdom of Portugal and the Algarves
- Prince Royal of Haiti, see Jacques-Victor Henry, Prince Royal of Haiti
- Prince Royal of France, to either of:
  - Louis-Charles, Duke of Normandy, during the constitutional monarchy of 1791–1792
  - Ferdinand Philippe, Duke of Orléans, during the July Monarchy

It may also refer to:

- Prince Royal (1610), a ship of the English Royal Navy
- Prince Royal (horse), Italian/French Champion racehorse
- Nissan Prince Royal, a Japanese vehicle built for the Imperial Household of Japan.

== See also ==
- Prince Imperial (disambiguation)
- Princess Royal, a style customarily awarded by a British monarch to his or her eldest daughter
- Prince Royal's College, a school in Thailand
