= Prince of the Sa'id =

Royal Standard of the Prince of the Sa'id.

Prince of the Sa'id (Arabic: أمير الصعيد Amīr as-Ṣaʻīd [ʔæˈmːiɾ ɑs.sˤɑˈʕiːd]) was the title used by the heir apparent to the Egyptian throne prior to the abolition of the monarchy following the Egyptian Revolution of 1952. The title translates as Prince of Upper Egypt.

== Background ==
The title was first used by the son and heir of Fuad I, Farouk Agha, who was officially named Prince of the Sa'id on 12 December 1933. The title that was given to Farouk Agha with the purchase in his name of 3,000 feddans of the best agricultural land. Farouk Agha held the title until he ascended the throne as Farouk I following the death of his father on 28 April 1936.

Since the title was only granted to heirs apparent, Farouk I's successor as heir, Mohammed Ali Tewfik, did not receive it as he was heir presumptive. The next person to hold the title was Farouk I's first (and only) son Ahmad Fuad. He held the title immediately following his birth on 16 January 1952 as he was the heir apparent of his father Farouk I. However, he only held it very briefly, since he ascended the throne as Fuad II following his father's forced abdication on 26 July 1952.

The Egyptian monarchy was abolished on 18 June 1953. Fuad II's eldest son Muhammad Ali (born on 5 February 1979) is styled Prince of the Sa'id. However, since the monarchy no longer exists in Egypt, the title has no legal standing, but is used as a form of courtesy.

== See also ==
- Crown prince
- Prince Imperial
