= Dominique-France Loeb-Picard =

Egyptian princess

- Born: 23 November 1948 (age 77); Paris, France
- Spouse: Fuad II (m. 1976; div. 1996)
- Issue: Muhammad Ali, Prince of the Sa'id; Princess Fawzia-Latifa; Prince Fakhruddin
- House: Muhammad Ali (by marriage)
- Father: David-Robert Loeb
- Mother: Paule-Madeleine Picard

Dominique-France Loeb-Picard (born 23 November 1948), also called Princess Fadila of Egypt or Fadila Farouk (Arabic: فضيلة فاروق), is the French ex-wife of Fuad II, former King of Egypt and the Sudan.

== Life and family ==
Dominique-France Loeb-Picard was born on 23 November 1948 in Paris as the daughter of Jewish-Alsatian archaeologist Prof. David-Robert Loeb and his French-Swiss-Jewish wife, Paule-Madeleine Picard, paternal granddaughter of Lazare Loeb and wife Berthe Weill and maternal granddaughter of Edmond Picard and wife Adèle-Andrée Dreyfus. Aged 29, as a student at the Sorbonne, Fadila wrote her doctoral thesis on the psychology of women in The Book of One Thousand and One Nights.

== Marriage and divorce ==
Loeb-Picard met and began a courtship with deposed king Fuad II; they contracted a civil marriage on 16 April 1976 in Paris, followed by a religious wedding in Monaco on 5 October 1977. Although she married Fuad II long after the loss of his throne, she was still styled as Her Majesty Queen Fadila of Egypt by monarchists.

Fadila chose a Turkish yashmak as her bridal headcraft, symbolising her conversion to her husband's religion.

The marriage ended in divorce in 1996, and afterwards she was styled as Her Royal Highness Princess Fadila of Egypt. In 2002, her apartment in Paris was taken from her due to her outstanding debts. The marriage was dissolved in 2008, and her royal style and title were removed by Fuad II.

== Children ==
She and Fuad II have three children:

- Muhammad Ali, Prince of the Sa'id (born 5 February 1979)
- Princess Fawzia-Latifa of Egypt (born 12 February 1982)
- Prince Fakhruddin of Egypt (born 25 August 1987)

== Bibliography ==
- Montgomery-Massingberd, Hugh, ed. (1980). "The Royal House of Egypt". Burke's Royal Families of the World. Vol. II: Africa & the Middle East. London: Burke's Peerage. pp. 20–37. ISBN 978-0-85011-029-6. OCLC 18496936.
