= Alexander Granville =

Alexander Granville Pasha CMG CBE KStJ MRCS LRCP (1874 – 30 March 1929) was a British physician and colonial administrator in British Egypt.

== Biography ==
Granville was born in Egypt, educated at Bloxham School and received his medical training at St Bartholomew's Hospital. He initially worked as a physician and house-surgeon at the West London Hospital in Maida Vale. He served in the South African War as a medical officer in the British Army.

He subsequently joined the colonial Egyptian Government Service, where he would hold several important posts. Granville worked as inspector of the Public Health Department, director at the Ministry of Interior and Director-General of the Alexandria Municipality. Among his most important contributions was the decrease in the death rate in Cairo by improving the unsanitary conditions in the crowded streets, which had contributed to high mortality rate from disease.

Granville became head of the Red Cross in Egypt. In 1916 he was made a Companion of the Order of St Michael and St George. In early 1919 Granville represented Egypt at the negotiations for the Treaty of Versailles.

On 19 August 1919 he became the first president of the Labor Conciliation Board, an organisation established by Fuad I of Egypt to avert the risk of strike action in Egypt. He was President of the Quarantine Board of Egypt and in 1920 he was invested as a Commander of the Order of the British Empire. In 1922 he was made a Pasha by Fuad I in recognition of his work on the Board. Granville was furthered honored as an Officer of the Order of the Nile and as an Officer of the Order of Ismail. He was a Knight of the Venerable Order of Saint John. In 1923 he was made a Commander of the Order of Leopold II by the Belgian government.

Granville died in London at age 55, after a long illness.
