= Princess Fawzia-Latifa of Egypt =

Egyptian royal

Princess Fawzia-Latifa
- Born: 12 February 1982 (age 44); Monte Carlo, Monaco
- Spouse: Sylvain Jean-Baptiste Alexandre Renaudeau (m. 2019)
- Issue: Nael Fouad Jean Renaudeau; Dunya Nariman Adele Renaudeau
- Dynasty: Muhammad Ali
- Father: Fuad II of Egypt
- Mother: Dominique-France Loeb-Picard
- Religion: Sunni Islam

Princess Fawzia-Latifa (Arabic: فوزية لطيفة; born 12 February 1982) is the daughter of Fuad II (last King of Egypt) by his wife, Fadila (born Dominique-France Loeb-Picard).

== Early life ==
Fawzia-Latifa was born on 12 February 1982 in Monte Carlo, Monaco. She was named Fawzia after her grandfather's sister, Princess Fawzia Fuad (former queen of Iran), and her father's half-sister, Princess Fawzia Farouk. She was named Latifa after Lalla Latifa Amahzoune, the mother of King Mohammed VI of Morocco.

Fawzia-Latifa was educated at:

- Lycée Janson de Sailly, Paris, France.
- Institut Le Rosey, boarding school in Rolle, Switzerland.
- Sciences Po Strasbourg (IEP Strasbourg), France.
- National Institute for Oriental Languages and Civilizations, France.
- The University of Paris 8 Vincennes-Saint-Denis, France.

Fawzia Latifa works in the field of public relations and media. She has also worked as a diplomat with the delegation of the Principality of Monaco in Berlin, Germany.

== Marriage ==
On 19 January 2019, at her father's residence in Geneva, she married Sylvain Jean-Baptiste Alexandre Renaudeau (born 9 November 1979), a French electronic engineer working in Monaco. They have two children.

- Nael Fouad Jean Renaudeau (b. 2019)
- Dunya Nariman Adele Renaudeau (b. 3 February 2021)

== Honours ==
- Decoration of Al Kemal in brilliants.
