= King of Egypt =

Title of the ruling monarch of Egypt from 1922 to 1951

- Crown of Egypt Royal Standard of Egypt

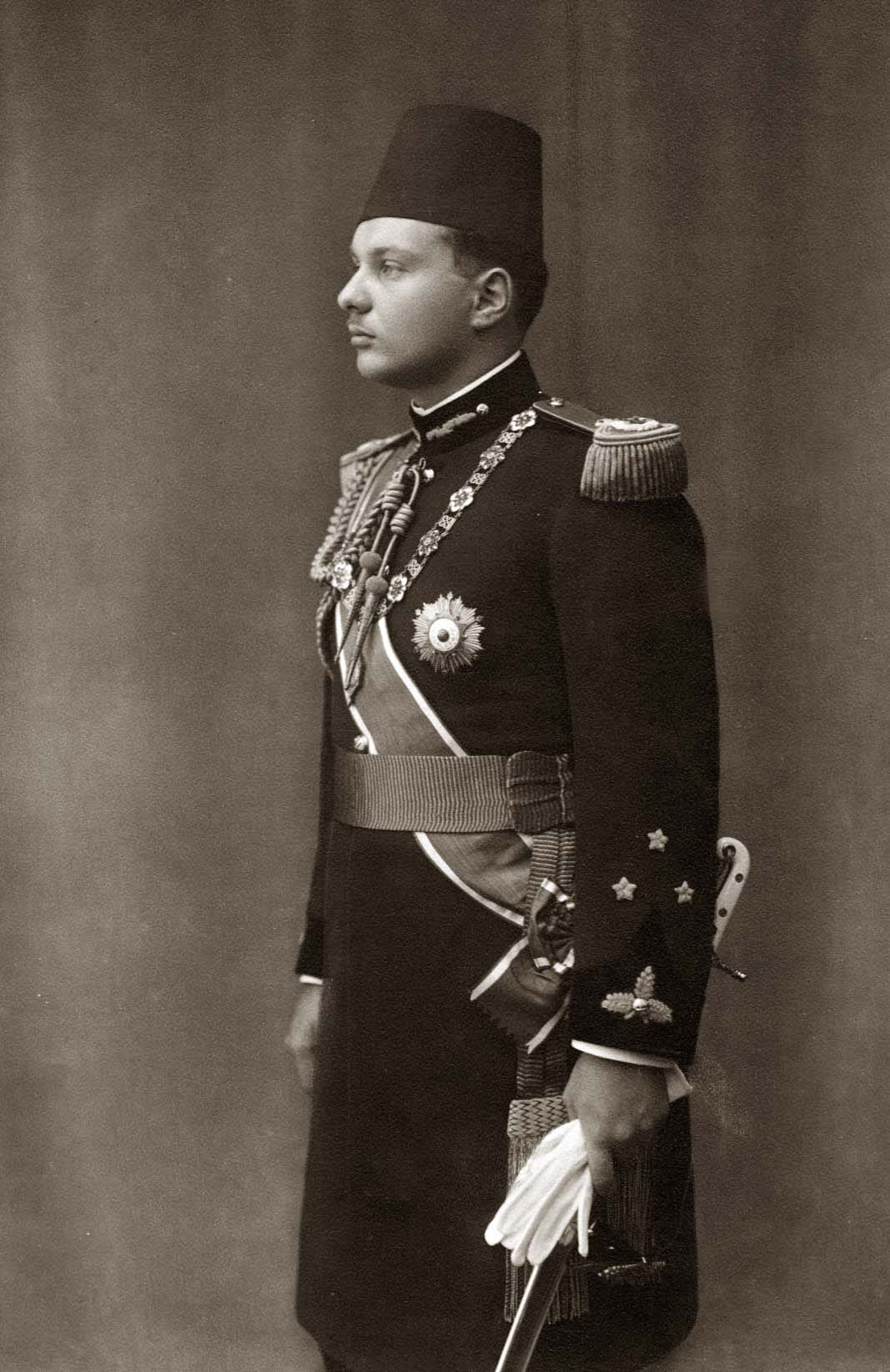
- Longest Reigning; Farouk of Egypt; 28 April 1936 – 16 October 1951

Details
- Style: His Majesty
- First monarch: Fuad I
- Last monarch: Farouk I
- Formed: 15 March 1922; Precursor: Sultan of Egypt
- Abolished: 18 June 1953; Successor: President of Egypt
- Residences: Abdeen Palace, Cairo, Egypt
- Appointer: Hereditary

King of Egypt (Egyptian Arabic: ملك مصر, romanized: Malik Miṣr) was the title used by the Head of State in the Kingdom of Egypt between 1922 and 1951. When the United Kingdom issued the Unilateral Declaration of Egyptian Independence on 28 February 1922, thereby ending its protectorate over Egypt, Egypt's Sultan Fuad I issued a decree on 15 March 1922 whereby he adopted the title of King of Egypt.

It has been reported that the title change was due not only to Egypt's newly independent status, but also to Fuad I's desire to be accorded the same title as the newly installed rulers of the newly created kingdoms of Hejaz, Syria and Iraq. The second monarch to be styled King of Egypt was Fuad I's son Farouk I, whose title was changed to King of Egypt and the Sudan in October 1951 following the Wafdist government's unilateral abrogation of the Anglo-Egyptian Treaty of 1936. In July of 1952, a group known as the Free Officers movement of Egypt launched the Egyptian revolution of 1952 against the Egyptian monarchy due to their immense unpopularity. Farouk was forced to abdicate and was subsequently exiled to Naples, Italy on July 26, 1952 in the wake of the coup. His infant son, Fuad II, succeeded him as king. The monarchy was later abolished and replaced by the President of Egypt on June 18, 1953.

The rulers of ancient Egypt may be described using the title King (a translation of the Egyptian word nsw) or pharaoh (derived from pr ˤ3). The story of Moses in the Quran includes his interaction with the ruler of Egypt, named Pharaoh (Arabic: فرعون, romanized: fir'aun). The earlier story of Joseph in Islam refers to the Egyptian ruler as a king (Arabic: ملك, romanized: malik).

== List of Monarchs ==
Portrait	Name	King From	King Until
	Fuad I	15 March 1922	28 April 1936
	Farouk I	28 April 1936	16 October 1951

== See also ==
- Pharaoh
- List of pharaohs
- List of monarchs of the Muhammad Ali Dynasty
- Lists of rulers of Egypt
