= Narriman Sadek =

Narriman Sadek ناريمان صادق
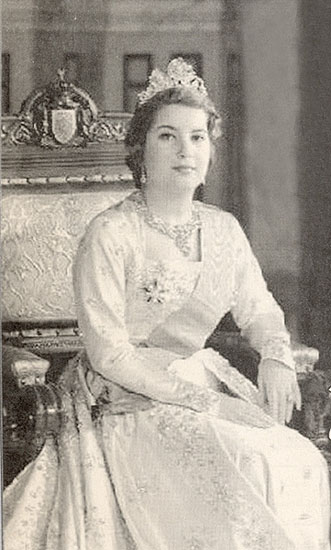
- Queen Narriman of Egypt

Queen consort of Egypt
- Tenure: 6 May 1951 – 26 July 1952
- Born: 31 October 1933; Cairo, Egypt
- Died: 16 February 2005 (aged 71); Cairo, Egypt
- Spouse: Farouk I of Egypt (m. 1951; div. 1954) Dr. Adham El-Nakeeb (m. 1954; div. 1961) Dr. Ismail Fahmi (m. 1967)
- Issue: Fuad II of Egypt; Akram El-Nakeeb
- House: Alawiyya (by marriage)
- Father: Hussein Fahmi Sadek Bey
- Mother: Asila Kamil Hanim
- Religion: Sunni Islam

Narriman Sadek (Arabic: ناريمان صادق, romanized: Nārrīmān Ṣādiq; 31 October 1933 – 16 February 2005) was the daughter of Hussain Fahmi Sadiq Bey, a high-ranking official in the Egyptian government, and his wife Asila Kamil. She was the second wife of King Farouk and the last queen of Egypt.

== Life ==
Her father was Hussain Fahmi Sadiq Bey, Deputy Minister of Transportation. He was the son of Ali Sadiq Bey, and Muhammad Sadek Pasha. Her mother was Asila Khanum, daughter of Kamel Mahmoud, of Minya Governorate.

Farouk divorced his first wife, Queen Farida, in 1948, after a ten-year marriage in which she had produced three daughters, but no male heir. In a bid to ensure his succession, and also to rekindle some public enthusiasm towards a decaying dynasty, he let it be known that he was in the market for a new bride, preferably an Egyptian, well-heeled but not of the aristocracy.

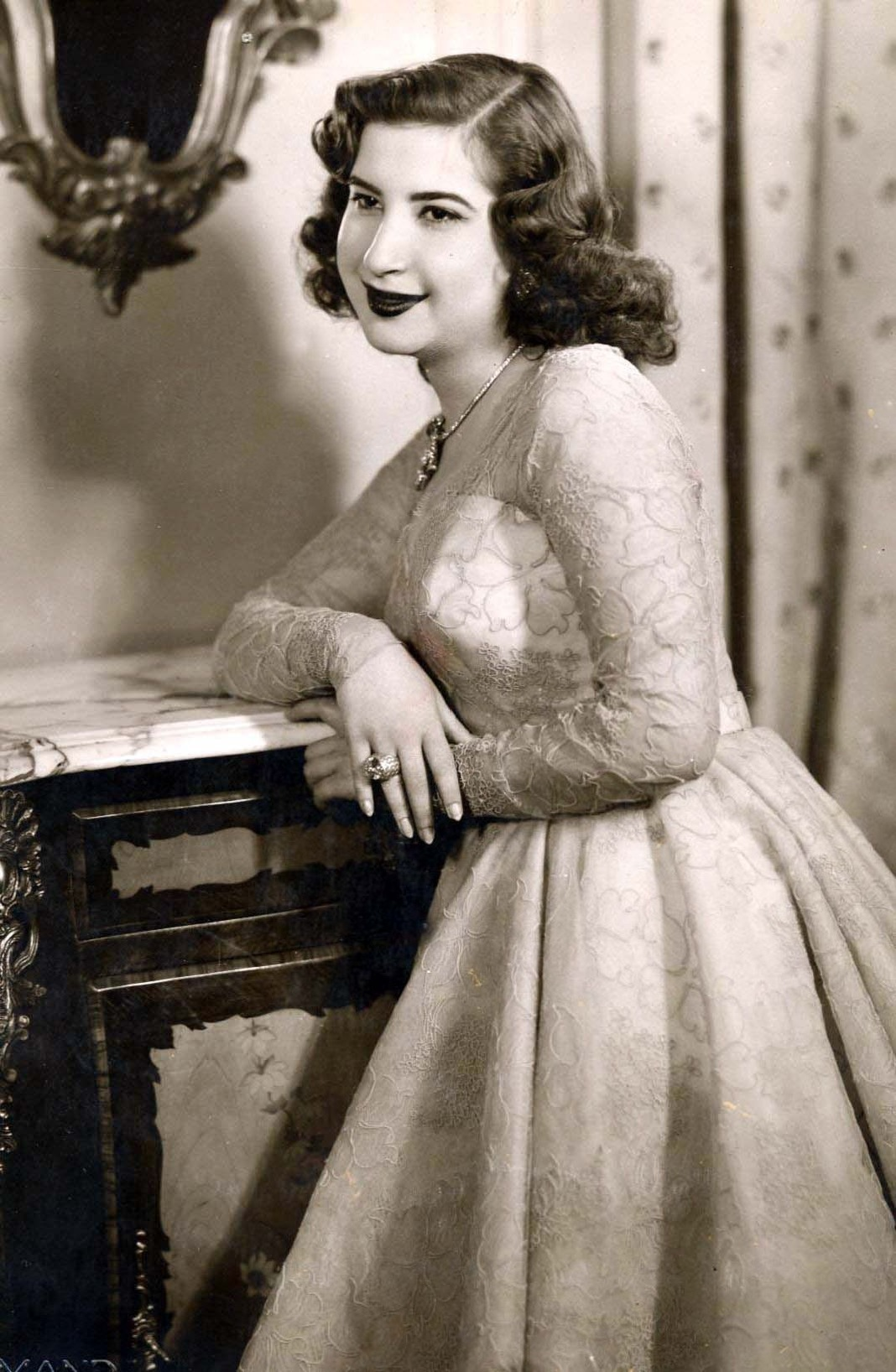
Narriman days before her wedding ceremony, which took place in Abdeen Palace on 6 May 1951.

=== Queen ===
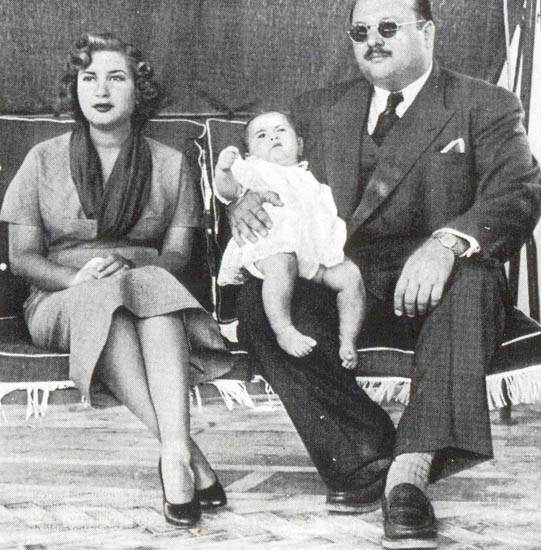
Narriman with King Farouk and their infant son Fuad II in exile in Capri in 1953.

Known as the "Cinderella of the Nile" for her middle-class background, Narriman was selected in part as a populist gesture to prop up public opinion of the monarchy. She broke off her previous engagement to a Harvard doctoral student named Zaki Hashem and was sent to Egypt's embassy in Rome to learn how to perform her royal duties. While in Rome she assumed the identity of the ambassador's niece in order to hide the purpose of her presence. At the embassy she studied history, etiquette, and four European languages. Countess Layla Martly, one of the most cultured and experienced ladies in Europe, accompanied Narriman to teach her history, the general behavior, and etiquette of the Royal cortege. Narriman lived in Rome at the Egyptian embassy in villa Savoy, which was the previous house of the Italian Royal family that was living at that time in Alexandria. Also, as a consequence of the king's order that she return to Egypt weighing at most 50 kilograms (110 lb), she was put on a strict weight-loss program. In May 1951, at the age of 17, she married Farouk, thus becoming Egypt's queen. The couple's wedding was lavish and extravagant. Narriman wore a bridal gown embroidered with 20,000 diamonds, and the two received a number of expensive presents. Those presents that were made of gold were subsequently secretly melted down into ingots.

On 16 January 1952, Narriman gave birth to their only son, Ahmed Fuad. Later that year, Farouk was forced to abdicate by the Egyptian Revolution of 1952. He was succeeded by his infant son, who assumed the throne as King Fuad II. Fuad's largely symbolic reign was cut short, however, with the establishment of a republic the following year.

== Divorce ==
Following Farouk's abdication, the royal family went into exile aboard the royal yacht El Mahrousa in July 1952. Bored with the itinerant lifestyle and tired of Farouk's philandering, Narriman returned to Egypt with her mother, to her former position as a commoner. She divorced Farouk in February 1954.

On 3 May 1954, she married Adham al-Nakib of Alexandria, who had been Farouk's personal doctor. They had one son, Akram, and subsequently divorced in 1961.

In 1967, she married Ismail Fahmi, another medical practitioner. She lived in seclusion in the Cairo suburb of Heliopolis until her death.

== Death ==
Nariman Fahmi died on 16 February 2005 in Dar al-Fouad hospital, on the outskirts of Cairo, Egypt, after a brain hemorrhage. Her last years were spent in seclusion in an apartment in Cairo's upscale Heliopolis neighbourhood, where she lived with her husband, Ismail Fahmi.

== Honours ==
- Decoration of Al Kemal in brilliants (Egypt, 5 May 1951).

== See also ==
- List of consorts of the Muhammad Ali Dynasty

Egyptian royalty
Vacant Title last held by Farida	Queen consort of Egypt; 1951–1952	Revolution
