= List of Egyptian flags =

List of flags of Egypt

This is a list of flags used by and in Egypt. For more information about the national flag, visit the article Flag of Egypt.

== National flags ==
Flag	Date	Use	Description
	1984–present	Flag of Egypt	Tricolour made of three equal horizontal bands—coloured red (top), white (middle) and black (bottom)—with the golden Eagle of Saladin centered in the white band.
	1984–present	Vertical flag of Egypt	

== Standards ==
=== Presidential standards ===
Throughout the republican era, the standard of the president of Egypt has been identical to its national flag, with the addition of the coat of arms (eagle or hawk) in the upper-left corner. Even though the Constitution of Egypt states that the President is the Supreme Commander of the Armed Forces (article 150), the flag of the Supreme Commander differs from the Presidential Standard. It is identical to the national flag, with the addition in the upper-left corner of a white Eagle of Saladin contained between two crossed swords. The Supreme Commander also has his own naval ensign, air force flag and air defence flag. Military ordinances state that the flags of the Supreme Commander must be hoisted during the President's visits to each military unit. The national flag must be hoisted in the middle, with the Presidential Standard on its right side, and the flag of the Supreme Commander on its left side.

Flag	Date	Use	Description
	1984–present	Current presidential standard	Identical to the current national flag—a tricolour featuring the golden Eagle of Saladin—with a second Eagle of Saladin added in the upper-hoist corner in the red band.
	1972–1984	Standard of the president of the Arab Republic of Egypt during the Federation of Arab Republics	Identical to Federation of Arab Republics' tricolour, featuring the golden Eagle of Quraish on the upper-hoist corner in the red band.
	1958–1972	Standard of the president of the United Arab Republic.	Identical to the national flag of the United Arab Republic—tricolour featuring two green stars—with the Eagle of Saladin added in the upper-hoist corner in the red band.
	1958–1972	Standard of the president of the United Arab Republic at sea.	Blue background featuring the Naval seal of the United Arab Republic and four foul anchors, one in each corner of the flag.
	1953–1958	Standard of the president of the Republic of Egypt	Identical to the national flag of the Republic of Egypt, with the Eagle of Saladin added in the upper-hoist corner.

=== Royal standards ===
Flag	Date	Use	Description
	1923–1953	Standard of the King of Egypt (adopted by Royal Ordinance No. 90 of 1923)	Identical to the national flag of the Kingdom of Egypt, with the royal crown added in the upper-hoist corner.
	?–1953	Naval ensign of the King of Egypt	
	1946–1953	Flag of the King's Air Force (adopted by Royal Decree No. 40 of 1946)	
	1946–1953	Flag of the King's Airplane (adopted by Royal Decree No. 40 of 1946)	
	1946–1953	Standard of the Crown Prince (adopted by Royal Decree No. 28 of 1946)	
	1946–1953	Naval ensign of the Crown Prince (adopted by Royal Decree No. 28 of 1946)	
	1946–1953	Flag of the Crown Prince's Air Force and Airplane (adopted by Royal Decree No. 28 of 1946)	

== Military ==
=== Army ===
Flag	Date	Use	Description
	1984–present	War flag of Egypt	The flag of Egypt with two crossed swords in white in the canton.
	1972–1984	War flag of Egypt	The flag of Egypt within the Federation of Arab Republics with two crossed swords in white in the canton.
	1958–1972	War flag of the United Arab Republic	The flag of the United Arab Republic with two crossed swords in white in the canton.
	1922–1958	War flag of Egypt	The flag of Egypt with two crossed swords in white in the canton.
	1922–1958	Flag of major general	The flag of Egypt with two crossed swords in white in the canton and two white stars in the top and bottom fly corners.
	1922–1958	Flag of lieutenant general	The flag of Egypt with two crossed swords in white in the canton and one white star in the top fly corner.

=== Navy ===
Flag	Date	Use	Description
	1984–present	Flag of the Egyptian Navy	The flag of Egypt in the canton on a blue field with two crossed white anchors surrounded by a wreath in the fly.
	1984–present	Naval ensign and jack of Egypt	The flag of Egypt with two crossed anchors in white in the canton.
	1972–1984	Naval ensign and jack of Egypt	The flag of Egypt within the Federation of Arab Republics with two crossed anchors in white in the canton.
	1958–1972	Naval ensign and jack of the United Arab Republic	The flag of the United Arab Republic with two crossed anchors in white in the canton.
	1922–1958	Naval ensign and naval jack of Egypt	The flag of Egypt with two crossed anchors in white in the canton.
	1984–present	Masthead pennant of the Egyptian Navy	
	1984–present	Flag of vice admiral	
	1984–present	Flag of rear admiral	
	1984–present	Flag of senior officer	
	1922–1958	Flag of admiral	The flag of Egypt with two crossed anchors in white in the canton and two white stars in the top and bottom fly corners.
	1922–1958	Flag of vice admiral	The flag of Egypt with two crossed anchors in white in the canton and one white star in the top fly corner.
	1922–1958	Flag of senior officer	

=== Air Force ===
Flag	Date	Use	Description
	1984–present	Air force ensign of Egypt	The flag of Egypt in the canton on a sky blue field with the roundel in the fly.
	1958–1972	Air force ensign of the United Arab Republic	The flag of the United Arab Republic in the canton on a sky blue field with the roundel in the fly.
	1922–1958	Royal flight flag	The flag of Egypt in the canton on a sky blue field with the roundel in the fly.
	1922–1958	Air force ensign of Egypt	
	1932–1958	Air Force rank flag of the Commander in Chief	
	1932–1958	Air Force rank flag of Wing Commander	
	1932–1958	Air Force rank flag of senior flight officer	

=== Air Defense Forces ===
Flag	Date	Use	Description
	1984–present	Flag of the Egyptian Air Defense Forces	

== Government department ==
Flag	Date	Use	Description
		Flag of the Supreme Council of Antiquities	

== Corporations ==
Flag	Date	Use	Description
		Flag of the Suez Canal Authority	

== Political flags ==
Flag	Date	Party	Description
	1953–present	Hizb ut-Tahrir	Black Standard with the Shahada in white
	1975–present	Egyptian Communist Party	
	1928–present	Muslim Brotherhood	
	1919–1952; 2003–2011; 1978–present	Wafd Party; Liberal Egyptian Party; Egyptian Wafd Party	Green flag with a white crescent and a white cross symbolizing the common struggle of Egyptian Muslims and Egyptian Christians against the British occupation.

== Historical flags ==
Flag	Date	Use	Description
	1972–1984	Flag of Egypt as part of the Federation of Arab Republics (adopted by Law No. 3 of 1971)	Tricolour made of three equal horizontal bands—coloured red (top), white (middle) and black (bottom)—with the golden Hawk of Quraysh centered in the white band.
	1958–1972	Flag of Egypt as part of the United Arab Republic due to the unity between Egypt and Syria, under the rule of President Gamal Abd El Nasser. (adopted by Law by Resolution No. 12 of 1958)	Tricolour made of three equal horizontal bands—coloured red (top), white (middle) and black (bottom)—with two five-pointed green stars in the white band, symbolizing Egypt and Syria.
	1952–1958	Flag of the 1952 Egyptian revolution and the Republic of Egypt; The green monarchical flag (see below) remained the national flag of Egypt until 1958, even after the proclamation of the Republic.	Following the Revolution of 1952, the Free Officers retained the flag of the Kingdom, but also introduced the former Republic of Egypt flag colors of red, white, and black horizontal bands, with the emblem of the Revolution, the Eagle of Saladin, in the center band, with a green escutcheon with a white crescent and three five-pointed stars.
	1923–1958	Flag of the Kingdom of Egypt and the co-official flag of the Republic of Egypt (adopted by Law No. 47 of 1923)	Green flag with a white crescent containing three white five-pointed stars.
	1914–1923	Flag of the Sultanate of Egypt	Red flag with three white crescents, each containing a five-pointed white star.
	1881–1914	Flag of the Khedivate of Egypt under British occupation	Identical to the national flag used between 1826 and 1867 (see description below).
	1867–1881	Flag of the Khedivate of Egypt	Red flag with a white crescent and three white five-pointed stars.
	1844–1867	Flag of self-declared Khedivate of Egypt introduced by Muhammad Ali	Red flag with a white crescent containing a five-pointed white star.
	1793–1844	Flag of Ottoman Egypt	Red flag with a white crescent containing a seven-pointed white star.

=== Other ===
Flag	Date	Use	Description
	19th century	Cecil Rhodes' personal flag symbolising his "Cape to Cairo" dream	
	1914–1922	Sultanate of Egypt Protectorate ensign	

== Proposed flags ==
Flag	Date	Use	Description
	1919	Flag used during the anti-British revolution of 1919	Green flag with a white crescent and a white cross symbolizing the common struggle of Egyptian Muslims and Egyptian Christians against the British occupation. Associated with the Wafd Party.
	1950s	Proposed flags for the Republic of Egypt following the Egyptian revolution of 1952	The flag of the Kingdom of Egypt in the canton of the 1952 Egyptian revolution tricolour (i.e. the 1952 Egyptian revolution flag without the Eagle of Saladin).
	1950s	Proposed flags for the Republic of Egypt following the Egyptian revolution of 1952	The 1952 Egyptian revolution tricolour in the canton of the flag of the Kingdom of Egypt, the latter modified with the white crescent and stars re-positioned to the fly to accommodate the tricolour in the canton.
	1950s	Proposed flags for the Republic of Egypt following the Egyptian revolution of 1952	The flag of the Kingdom of Egypt with the white crescent and stars re-positioned to the fly, and the 1952 Egyptian revolution tricolour as an elongated pile at the hoist.
	1950s	Proposed flags for the Republic of Egypt following the Egyptian revolution of 1952	The Arab Liberation tricolour, with the flag of the Kingdom of Egypt as a pile at the hoist.
	1950s	Proposed flags for the Republic of Egypt following the Egyptian revolution of 1952	The white crescent and stars on a green field of the flag of the Kingdom of Egypt rotated 90° crowned by a white representation of the three pyramids of Giza all appearing on the hoist side, and the Arab Liberation tricolour on the fly.
	1950s	Proposed flags for the Republic of Egypt following the Egyptian revolution of 1952	A white representation of the River Nile on the green field of the flag of the Kingdom of Egypt, with the 1952 Egyptian revolution tricolour in a fly-side canton onto which the crescent and three stars of the flag of the Kingdom of Egypt are placed.
	1950s	Proposed flags for the Republic of Egypt following the Egyptian revolution of 1952	A horizontal tricolour of red, white, and black.

== Bibliography ==
- el Ansary, Nasser (2001). "Évolution du drapeau égyptien" [Evolution of the Egyptian flag]. L'Encyclopédie des souverains d'Égypte des pharaons à nos jours [The Encyclopedia of rulers of Egypt from the Pharaohs until today] (in French). Alleur: Éditions du Perron. pp. 142–147. ISBN 978-2-87114-173-0. OCLC 48965345.
