= Crown prince =

Male heir to a throne

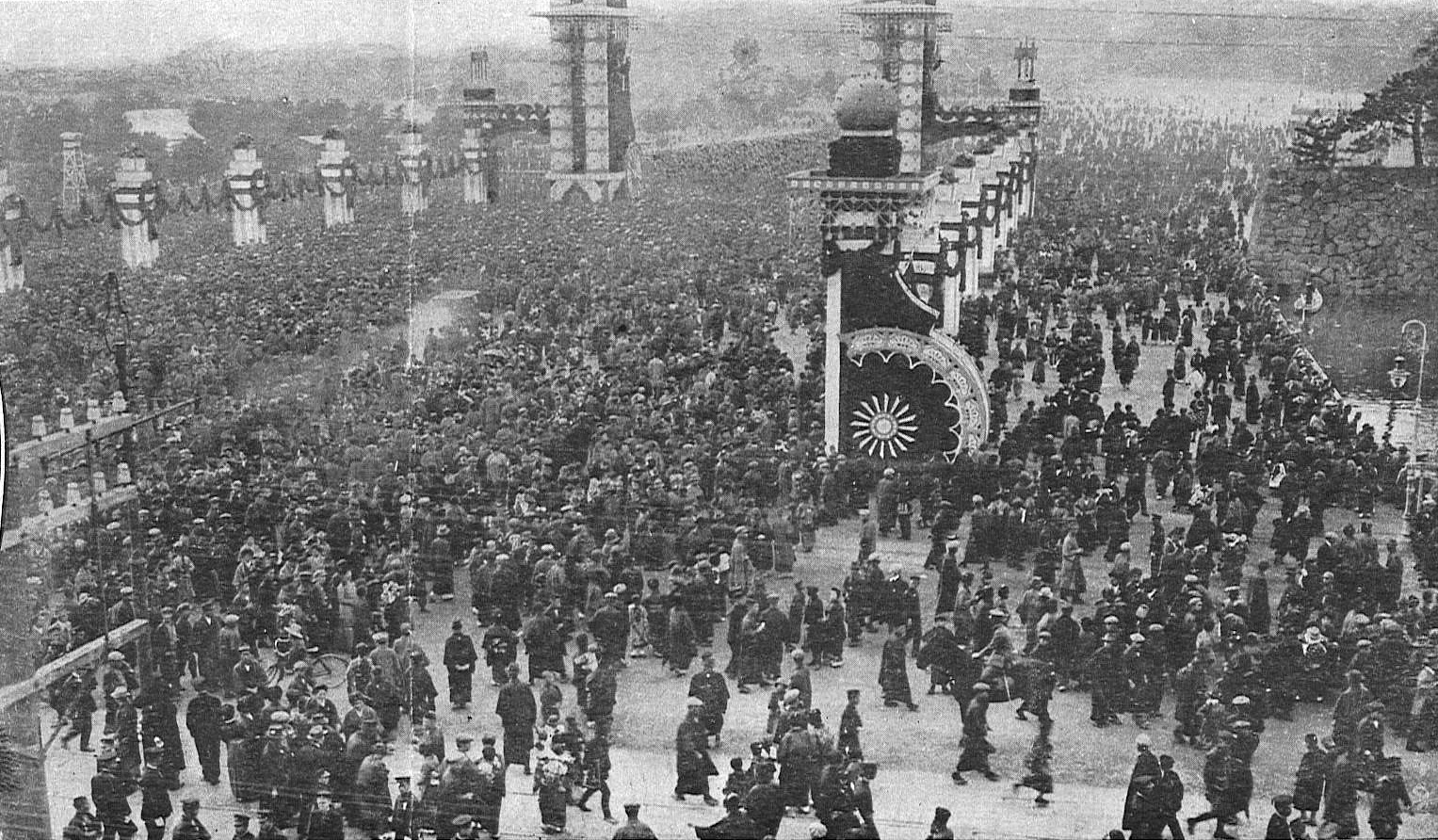
Throngs before the Imperial Palace in Japan awaiting the appearance of Crown Prince Hirohito for the recent proclamation of his official recognition as the heir apparent to the Japanese Imperial Throne – New York Times, 1916.

A crown prince or hereditary prince is the heir apparent to the throne in a royal or imperial monarchy. The female form of the title, crown princess, is held by a woman who is heir apparent or is married to the heir apparent.

Crown prince as a descriptive term has been used throughout history for the prince who is first-in-line to a throne and is expected to succeed (i.e. the heir apparent), barring any unforeseen future event preventing this. In certain monarchies, a more specific substantive title may be accorded and become associated with the position of heir apparent (e.g. Prince of Wales in the United Kingdom, Prince of Asturias in the Kingdom of Spain and formerly the Dauphin in France). In these monarchies, the term crown prince may be used less often than the substantive title (or never).

Until the late twentieth century, no modern monarchy adopted a system whereby women would be guaranteed to succeed to the throne (i.e. absolute primogeniture). A crown princess would therefore be more likely to refer to the spouse of a crown prince. She would be styled crown princess, not in her own right but by courtesy. Many European countries have now abolished male primogeniture; a notable exception is Spain.

== Description ==
The term crown prince is not used in European monarchies if the hereditary sovereign holds a title below that of king/queen or emperor/empress (such as grand duke or prince), although it is sometimes used as a synonym for heir apparent.

In Europe, where primogeniture governed succession to all monarchies except those of the papacy and Andorra, the eldest son or (more recently) eldest child of the current monarch fills the role of crown prince or princess, depending upon whether women of the dynasty enjoy personal succession rights. Male precedence has been abolished in Belgium, Denmark, Luxembourg, Norway, Sweden and the Netherlands, as well as in the United Kingdom and other Commonwealth realms pursuant to the Succession to the Crown Act 2013. The eldest living child of a monarch is sometimes not the heir apparent or crown prince, because that position can be held by a descendant of a deceased older child who, by "right of representation", inherits the same place in the line of succession that would be held by the ancestor if he or she were still living (for example, Carl Gustaf, Duke of Jämtland was the crown prince of Sweden from 1950 to 1973, as the senior grandson by male primogeniture of King Gustaf VI Adolf, although the former Prince Sigvard, Duke of Uppland was Gustaf VI Adolf's eldest living son, and Prince Bertil, Duke of Halland his eldest living dynastic son during those years).

In some monarchies, those of the Middle East for example, in which primogeniture is not the decisive factor in dynastic succession, a person may not possess the title or status of crown prince by right of birth, but may obtain (and lose) it as a result of an official designation made on some other legal or traditional basis, such as former crown prince Hassan bin Talal of Jordan.

Compare heir apparent and heir presumptive. In Scandinavian kingdoms, the heir presumptive to the crown may hold a different title from an heir apparent: hereditary prince (German: Erbprinz, French: prince héréditaire). It is also the title borne by the heir apparent of Liechtenstein, as well as the heir apparent or presumptive of Monaco. In Luxembourg, the heir apparent bears the title of hereditary grand duke (German: Erbgroßherzog, Luxembourgish: ierfgroussherzog); along with hereditary prince, it was also the title borne by the heirs apparent to the thrones of the grand duchies, sovereign duchies and principalities, and of mediatized princely families in the German monarchies abolished in 1918.

== Substantive traditional titles ==
Many monarchies use or did use substantive titles for their heirs apparent, often of historical origin:

- Bey al-Mahalla (Kingdom of Tunisia)
- Dauphin (Kingdom of France)
- Duke of Brabant (Belgium)
- Duke of Braganza (Kingdom of Portugal)
- Duke of Cornwall (Kingdom of England), currently one of the titles of the Prince of Wales
- Duke of Rothesay (Kingdom of Scotland), currently used by the Prince of Wales in place of his Welsh title when in Scotland
- Earl of Carrick (Kingdom of Scotland), currently one of the titles of the Prince of Wales when in Scotland
- Grand Prince of Tuscany (Grand Duchy of Tuscany)
- Lord of the Isles (Kingdom of Scotland), currently one of the titles of the Prince of Wales when in Scotland
- Margrave of Moravia (Kingdom of Bohemia)
- Prince of Asturias (Castile & Spain), also used by heirs presumptive
- Prince of Girona (Aragon & Spain)
- Prince Imperial or Prince Napoléon (French Empire)
- Prince Imperial (Empire of Brazil)
- Prince Imperial (Mexican Empire)
- Prince of Orange (Netherlands), whether or not the equivalent title is held by the spouse of the titleholder is decided by the Dutch parliament (e.g., Queen Máxima of the Netherlands was never titled Princess of Orange by marriage for this reason)
- Prince of Piedmont (Kingdom of Sardinia, and then Kingdom of Italy, when it was alternated with Prince of Naples) once conferred by King Joseph Bonaparte
- Prince Royal (France in 1789–1791 and the July Monarchy, and Portugal since 1815)
- Prince of the Sa'id (Kingdom of Egypt)
- Prince of Tarnovo (Kingdom of Bulgaria)
- Prince of Viana (Navarre & Spain)
- Rex iunior (Kingdom of Hungary), lit. junior king as he was crowned during the life of the incumbent king
- Tsesarevich (Russia)
- Królewicz (Poland)
- Veliahd (Ottoman Empire)

Some monarchies have used (although not always de jure) a territorial title for heirs apparent which, though often perceived as a crown princely title, is not automatically hereditary. It generally requires a specific conferral by the sovereign, which may be withheld.

Current and past titles in this category include:

- Caesar or Kaisar (Roman and early Byzantine Empires) in honor of Gaius Julius Caesar, distinguished from the senior Augustus
- Aetheling (Anglo-Saxon England) and edling (Welsh kingdoms), lit. of the royal family
- Duke of Estonia and Lolland (Denmark; during, at least, reigns of Christopher II and Valdemar IV)
- Prince of Wales and Earl of Chester (England, Great Britain, United Kingdom)
- King of the Romans (Holy Roman Empire) – an elective, rather than an inherited title, for the designated successor—usually the son, but sometimes the brother—of the Emperor
- King of Rome (First French Empire)
- Duke of Sparta (Kingdom of Greece); used briefly, within Greece, only by Prince Constantine, during the reign of his father, King George I
- Duke of Valentinois, used by several heirs to the Monégasque throne
- Marquess of Baux, used by several heirs to the Monégasque throne
- Prince of Brazil (title of the Portuguese heir from 1645 to 1815)
- Tupoutoʻa (Tonga)
- Duke of Scania (Sweden during the time when Magnus IV of Sweden also was King of Terra Scania)
- Prince of Ani (Kingdom of West Armenia)
- Grand Voivode of Alba Iulia (Kingdom of Romania from 1930 to 1940)
- Grand Voivode of Grahovo (Kingdom of Montenegro)
- Prince of Venice (see Prince Eugène de Beauharnais); for the heir presumptive to Napoleon I in his kingdom of Italy
- Duke of Calabria (Kingdom of Naples and Kingdom of the Two Sicilies); prior to the accession of King Robert the title of the Neapolitan heir was Prince of Salerno
- Pangeran Adipati Anom (House of Mataram)

== Monarchies that use the title of crown prince ==
Currently, the following monarchies use the term "crown prince" (or "crown princess") for the heirs apparent to their thrones:

Polity	Title in native language	Current holder
Abu Dhabi (United Arab Emirates)	ولي العهد, Walī al-ʻAhd	Khaled bin Mohamed Al Nahyan
Afro-Bolivia (Bolivia)	El Príncipe heredero	Rolando Pinedo Larrea
Ajman (United Arab Emirates)	ولي العهد, Walī al-ʻAhd	Ammar bin Humaid Al Nuaimi
Bahrain	ولي العهد, Walī al-ʻAhd	Salman bin Hamad Al Khalifa
Brunei	Pengiran Muda Mahkota	Al-Muhtadee Billah
Denmark	Kronprins	Christian
Dubai (United Arab Emirates)	ولي العهد, Walī al-ʻAhd	Hamdan bin Mohammed Al Maktoum
Fujairah (United Arab Emirates)	ولي العهد, Walī al-ʻAhd	Mohammed bin Hamad bin Mohammed Al Sharqi
Japan	皇太子, Kōtaishi	Fumihito, Crown Prince Akishino (Holds the title of kōshi (皇嗣) since he is the Emperor's brother)
Johor (Malaysia)	Tunku Mahkota	Tunku Ismail Idris
Jordan	ولي العهد, Walī al-ʻAhd	Hussein bin Abdullah
Kedah (Malaysia)	Raja Muda	Tengku Sarafudin Badlishah
Kelantan (Malaysia)	Tengku Mahkota	Tengku Muhammad Fakhry Petra
Kuwait	ولي العهد, Walī al-ʻAhd	Sabah Al-Khalid Al-Sabah
Morocco	ولي العهد, Walī al-ʻAhd	Moulay Hassan
Norway	Kronprins or Kronprinsesse	Ingrid Alexandra
Oman	ولي العهد, Walī al-ʻAhd	Theyazin bin Haitham
Pahang (Malaysia)	Tengku Mahkota	Tengku Hassanal Ibrahim Alam Shah
Perak (Malaysia)	Raja Muda	Raja Jaafar
Perlis (Malaysia)	Raja Muda	Tuanku Syed Faizuddin Putra Jamalullail
Ras Al Khaimah (United Arab Emirates)	ولي العهد, Walī al-ʻAhd	Mohammed bin Saud Al Qasimi
Saudi Arabia	ولي العهد, Walī al-ʻAhd	Mohammed bin Salman
Selangor (Malaysia)	Raja Muda	Tengku Amir Shah
Sharjah (United Arab Emirates)	ولي العهد, Walī al-ʻAhd	Sultan bin Muhammad bin Sultan Al-Qasimi
Sweden	Kronprins or Kronprinsessa	Victoria
Terengganu (Malaysia)	Yang di-Pertuan Muda	Tengku Muhammad Ismail
Thailand	สยามมกุฎราชกุมาร, Sayammakutratchakuman	Dipangkorn Rasmijoti
Tonga	Pilinisi Kalauni	Tupoutoʻa ʻUlukalala
Umm Al Quwain (United Arab Emirates)	ولي العهد, Walī al-ʻAhd	Rashid bin Saud Al Mualla
Yogyakarta (Indonesia)	Gusti Kanjeng Ratu Mangkubumi	Princess Mangkubumi

In addition, the following heirs apparent to deposed monarchies continue to use their former titles by international courtesy:

- Pavlos, Crown Prince of Greece
- Reza Pahlavi, Crown Prince of Iran
- Paras Shah, Crown Prince of Nepal
- Alexander, Crown Prince of Yugoslavia

== Other specific traditions ==
In Islamic tradition, the title is the Arabic term Wali al-Ahd.

- In Persia (Iran), during the Pahlavi dynasty and Qajar dynasty, the full style was Vala Hazrat-i-Humayun Vali Ahd, Shahzada (given name) (meaning "His August Imperial Highness the Heir Apparent, Prince ...");
- The title was adopted by many oriental monarchies, even some non-Muslim, e.g. "Walet" as alternative title for the Nepali (Hindu) royal heir apparent; first used by Crown Prince Trailokya in the middle of the nineteenth century, taken from the Mughal title 'Vali Ahd'.

Hindu tradition (Indian subcontinent):

- Yuvaraja was part of the full title in many princely states of India, e.g. in Jammu and Kashmir, the heir apparent was styled Maharaj Kumar Shri Yuvaraj (personal name) Singhji Bahadur
- Nepal, where the King was styled Maharajadhiraja:
  - the heir apparent was styled: Sri Sri Sri Sri Sri Yuvarajadhiraj ('Young King of Kings', i.e. Crown Prince) (personal name) Bir Bikram Shah Deva;
  - the eldest son of the heir apparent was styled: Sri Sri Sri Sri Sri Nava Yuvaraj ('Young Crown Prince') (personal name) Bir Bikram Shah Deva

East Asian traditions:

- The cognates of Chinese Huang Taizi (皇太子, "Great Imperial Son") – if a son of the reigning emperor, and Huang Taisun (皇太孫, Great Imperial Grandson) – if a grandson of the emperor:

if the heir apparent is a:	son	grandson
Chinese	Huang Taizi	Huang Taisun
Japanese	Kōtaishi	Kōtaison
Korean	Hwangtaeja (황태자)	Hwangtaeson (황태손)
Vietnamese	Hoàng Thái Tử	Hoàng Thái Tôn

- The crown prince of an emperor was sometimes referred as Dong-gong (東宮, 'East Palace') due to the location of his residence from the main palace.
- If the crown prince is the son of a king, he was called 世子 (Shizi).
- The crown prince was not necessarily the first-born son.
- During the Joseon dynasty in Korea, the crown prince was often referred as Dong-gung (동궁, 東宮, 'East Palace') or wangseja (王世子 왕세자); The first-born son was called wonja (元子 원자).
- In Japan, the Imperial Crown Prince is the son or grandson of the current emperor and is referred to as kōtaishi or kōtaison respectively. As of 2025, Japan has a crown prince, Prince Fumihito who holds the title of "kōshi" as he is not the imperial crown prince (due to him being the Emperor's brother). In the past, this title was gender neutral and has been conferred upon one woman, Princess Abe.

Southeast Asian traditions:

- Siam Makutrajakuman (สยามมกุฎราชกุมาร) in Thailand since 1886.
- Krom Phrarajawangboworn Sathanmongkol or Phra Maha Uparaja or commonly called Wang Na (or Front Palace) in Thailand prior to 1886.
- Kanjeng Gusti Pangeran Adipati Anom in Surakarta sultanate, Indonesia.
- Raja Muda or Tengku Mahkota in the Malay sultanates of Malaysia.
- Pengiran Muda Mahkota in Brunei

Equivalents in other cultures:

- Jaguar Prince (Mesoamerica)
- Ka Haku O Hawaiʻi or "The Lord of Hawaii" in the Hawaiian language.
- Aremo, "First Son and Heir" in the Yoruba language of West Africa, used as a royal title in many of the kingdoms of the region.
- Lee Jae-yong, South Korean billionaire and Chairman of Samsung referred to as the "Crown Prince of Samsung"

== See also ==
- Caesar (title) (since the tetrarchy) and Consors imperii
- Princeps iuventutis, in Ancient Rome
- Prince of the blood, a title, especially in France as prince du sang
- Princelings, descendants of prominent members of the Chinese Communist Party
- Prince regent, a prince serving as the monarch
- List of heirs apparent
- Taizi, title of the crown prince of Imperial China
- Yuvraj, title of a crown prince in India
