= King of Egypt and the Sudan =

Title of the ruling monarch of Egypt from 1951 to 1953

Malik of Egypt and the Sudan
- Royal Crown Royal Standard of Egypt

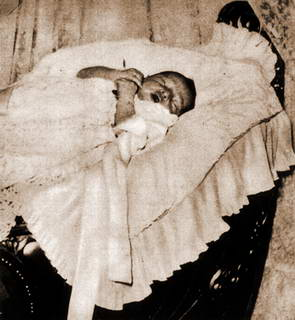
- Last to reign Fuad II; 26 July 1952–18 June 1953

Details
- Style: His Majesty
- First monarch: Farouk I
- Last monarch: Fuad II
- Formed: 16 October 1951; Precursor: King of Egypt
- Abolished: 18 June 1953; Successor: President of Egypt
- Residences: Abdeen Palace, Cairo, Egypt
- Appointer: Hereditary
- Pretender: Fuad II

King of Egypt and the Sudan (Arabic: ملك مصر والسودان Malik Miṣr was-Sūdān) was the title used by the Egyptian monarch from 16 October 1951 until the abolition of the monarchy on 18 June 1953. It was replaced by the President of Egypt.

In 1951, the Egyptian Parliament amended the Constitution by Law 176 of 16 October 1951 to provide that the title of the King should be "King of Egypt and the Sudan" instead of "King of Egypt, Sovereign of Nubia, Sudan, Kordofan, and Darfur". This move came in the wake of Wafdist Prime Minister Nahhas Pasha's decision to unilaterally abrogate the Anglo-Egyptian Treaty of 1936. The change in King Farouk I's title was intended to further Egypt's claims over the Sudan, which had been an Anglo-Egyptian condominium since 1899.

The title had long been used by Egyptian nationalists to emphasize their desire for the unity of the Nile Valley. For instance, expatriate Egyptian students in France greeted Farouk I during his 1937 tour of Europe by proclaiming "Long live the King of Egypt and Sudan". A Member of Parliament is also reported to have cried out "Long live His Majesty, King of Egypt and Sudan!" during Farouk I's coronation ceremony. However, the title had no legal standing prior to 1951, and Farouk I was officially "Sovereign of the Sudan" (not King) until the Wafdist government's decision to change his title. The title "King of the Sudan" was merely ceremonial, as the Egyptian King did not exercise effective control over Sudan, which was administered by the United Kingdom. The British objected to the title and did not recognize it, claiming that Egypt needed to respect the Sudanese people's right to self-determination. Many other countries also refused to recognize Farouk I as "King of the Sudan", notably the United States, as well as the Vatican.

The only other monarch to officially use the title "King of Egypt and the Sudan" besides Farouk I was his infant son Fuad II. The title was used very briefly, as the Egyptian monarchy was abolished on 18 June 1953. Despite its short-lived existence, the title was used as an overprint on numerous Egyptian postage stamps. Many of extant stamps showing Farouk I's portrait thus bear the Arabic inscription "King of Egypt and the Sudan".

== List of Monarchs ==
Portrait	Name	King From	King Until
	Farouk I	16 October 1951	26 July 1952
	Fuad II	26 July 1952	18 June 1953

== See also ==
- King of Egypt
- List of rulers of Egypt
- History of Sudan under Muhammad Ali and his successors

Regnal titles
Preceded by King of Egypt	Style of the Egyptian sovereign 1951–1953	Monarchy abolished (Office of President of Egypt created)
