= Kingdom of Egypt =

State in Northeast Africa and Western Asia (1922–1953)

Coordinates: 30°3′N 31°13′E

Kingdom of Egypt المملكة المصرية (Arabic) Al-Mamlaka Al-Miṣriyya
- 1922–1953
- Flag Coat of arms
- Anthem: اسلمي يا مصر (Arabic) "Eslami ya Misr" (1923–1936) "Be Safe, O Egypt" Royal anthem: سلام افاندينا (Arabic) "Salam Affandina" (1936–1953) "Salute of Our Lord"
- Green: Kingdom of Egypt; Lighter green: Condominium of Anglo-Egyptian Sudan; Lightest green: Ceded by Sudan to Italian Libya in 1934.
- Capital and largest city: Cairo
- Official languages: Arabic
- Common languages: Egyptian Arabic
- Religion: See Religion in Egypt
- Demonym: Egyptian
- Government: Unitary parliamentary semi-constitutional monarchy (1922–1935) Unitary parliamentary constitutional monarchy (1935–1952) Unitary constitutional monarchy under a regency (1952–1953)
- King
  - 1922–1936: Fuad I
  - 1936–1952: Farouk I
  - 1952–1953: Fuad II ^{a}
- British High Commissioner
  - 1922–1925: The 1st Viscount Allenby
  - 1925–1929: The 1st Baron Lloyd
  - 1929–1933: Sir Percy Loraine
  - 1933–1936: Sir Miles Lampson
- Prime Minister
  - 1922 (first): Abdel Khaliq Sarwat Pasha
  - 1952–1953 (last): Mohamed Naguib^{b}
- Legislature: Parliament
  - Upper house: Senate
  - Lower house: Chamber of Deputies
- History
  - Independence from the United Kingdom: 28 February 1922
  - Sultan Fuad I becomes King Fuad I: 15 March 1922
  - Constitution adopted: 19 April 1923
  - Anglo-Egyptian Treaty: 27 August 1936
  - 1952 Egyptian revolution: 23 July 1952
  - Abolition of the monarchy, and declaration of the Republic: 18 June 1953

Area
  - Total: 3,700,000 km^{2} (1,400,000 sq mi)
- 1937: 994,000 km^{2} (384,000 sq mi)

Population
  - 1927: 14,218,000
  - 1937: 15,933,000
  - 1947 census: 19,090,447
- Currency: Egyptian pound
Preceded by	Succeeded by
Sultanate of Egypt	Republic of Egypt
- Today part of: Egypt; Sudan; South Sudan; Libya (land ceded); Gaza Strip (protectorate)
- 1. Under regency.; 2. Became first President of Egypt.

The Kingdom of Egypt (Arabic: المملكة المصرية, romanized: Al-Mamlaka Al-Miṣriyya, lit. 'The Egyptian Kingdom') was the legal form of the Egyptian state during the latter period of the Muhammad Ali dynasty's reign, from the United Kingdom's recognition of Egyptian independence in 1922 until the abolition of the monarchy of Egypt and the Sudan in 1953 following the Egyptian Revolution of 1952. Until the Anglo-Egyptian treaty of 1936, the Kingdom was only nominally independent, as the United Kingdom retained control of foreign relations, communications, the military, and the territory of Anglo-Egyptian Sudan. Officially, Sudan was governed as a condominium of the two states; however, in reality, true power in Sudan lay with the United Kingdom. Between 1936 and 1953, the British continued to maintain their military presence in the Suez Canal, as well as influence over Egypt's political advisers, at a reduced level.

The legal status of Egypt had been highly convoluted, due to its de facto breakaway from the Ottoman Empire in 1805, its occupation by Britain in 1882, and the re-establishment of the Sultanate of Egypt (destroyed by the Ottomans in 1517) as a British protectorate in 1914. In line with the change in status from sultanate to kingdom, the title of the reigning Sultan, Fuad I, was changed from Sultan of Egypt to King of Egypt. Throughout the Kingdom's existence, the Sudan was formally united with Egypt. However, actual Egyptian authority in the Sudan was largely nominal due to the United Kingdom's role as the dominant power in the Anglo-Egyptian Sudan. As had been the case during the Khedivate of Egypt, and the Sultanate of Egypt, the Egyptian monarch was styled as the sovereign of "Egypt and the Sudan".

During the reign of King Fuad, the monarchy struggled with the Wafd Party, a broadly based nationalist political organisation strongly opposed to British influence in Egypt, and with the British themselves, who were determined to maintain their control over the Suez Canal. Other political forces emerging in this period included the Communist Party (1921), and the Muslim Brotherhood (1928), which eventually became a potent political and religious force.

King Fuad died in 1936, and the throne passed to his 16-year-old son, Farouk. Rising nationalist sentiment in Egypt and the Sudan, and British concern following Fascist Italy's recent invasion of Abyssinia led to the Anglo-Egyptian treaty of 1936, which required the United Kingdom to withdraw all troops from Egypt proper (excluding the Sudan), except in the Suez Canal Zone (agreed to be evacuated by 1949), but permitted the return of British military personnel in the event of war. The Kingdom was plagued by corruption, and its subjects saw it as a puppet of the British, notwithstanding the bitter enmity between King Farouk and the United Kingdom during the Second World War, as evidenced by the Abdeen Palace incident of 1942. This, coupled with the defeat in the 1948 Arab–Israeli War of 1948–1949, led to the 1952 Egyptian revolution by the Free Officers Movement. Farouk abdicated in favour of his infant son Ahmed Fuad, who became King Fuad II. In 1953 the monarchy was abolished, and Egypt became a republic. The legal status of the Sudan was only resolved in 1953, when Egypt and the United Kingdom agreed that it should be granted independence in 1956.

== History ==
=== Sultanate and Kingdom ===
During the Ottoman period, the country was administered as the Egypt Eyalet, followed by the autonomous tributary state of the Khedivate of Egypt ruled by the Muhammad Ali dynasty.

In 1914, Khedive Abbas II sided with the Ottoman Empire and the Central Powers in the First World War, and was promptly deposed by the British in favour of his uncle Hussein Kamel, creating the Sultanate of Egypt. Ottoman sovereignty over Egypt, which had been hardly more than a legal fiction since 1805, now was officially terminated. Hussein Kamel was declared Sultan of Egypt, and the country became a British protectorate.

=== Aftermath of the First World War ===
A group known as the Wafd (meaning "Delegation") attended the Paris Peace Conference of 1919 to demand Egypt's independence. Included in the group was political leader, Saad Zaghlul, who would later become Prime Minister. When the group was arrested and deported to the island of Malta, demonstrations started to occur in Egypt.

From March to April 1919, there were mass demonstrations that turned into uprisings. These are known in Egypt as the First Revolution. In November 1919, the Milner Commission was sent to Egypt by the British to attempt to resolve the situation. In 1920, Lord Milner submitted his report to Lord Curzon, the British Foreign Secretary, recommending that the protectorate should be replaced by a treaty of alliance.

As a result, Curzon agreed to receive an Egyptian mission headed by Zaghlul and Adli Pasha to discuss the proposals. The mission arrived in London in June 1920 and the agreement was concluded in August 1920. In February 1921, the British Parliament approved the agreement and Egypt was asked to send another mission to London with full powers to conclude a definitive treaty. Adli Pasha led this mission, which arrived in June 1921. However, the Dominion delegates at the 1921 Imperial Conference had stressed the importance of maintaining control over the Suez Canal Zone and Curzon could not persuade his Cabinet colleagues to agree to any terms that Adli Pasha was prepared to accept. The mission returned to Egypt in disgust.

In December 1921, the British authorities in Cairo imposed martial law and once again deported Zaghlul. Demonstrations again led to violence. In deference to the growing nationalism and at the suggestion of the High Commissioner, Field Marshal The 1st Viscount Allenby, the United Kingdom officially recognised Egyptian independence in February 1922, abolishing the protectorate, and converting the Sultanate of Egypt into the Kingdom of Egypt. Sarwat Pasha became prime minister. British influence, however, continued to dominate Egypt's political life and fostered fiscal, administrative, and governmental reforms. Britain retained control of the Canal Zone, the Anglo-Egyptian Sudan and Egypt's external protection, the police, army, the railways and communications, the protection of foreign interests and minorities, pending a final agreement.

Representing the Wafd Party, Zaghlul was elected Prime Minister in 1924. He demanded that Britain recognise Egyptian sovereignty in the Sudan and the unity of the Nile Valley. On 19 November 1924, Major-General Sir Lee Stack, the Governor-General of the Anglo-Egyptian Sudan, was assassinated in Cairo and pro-Egyptian riots broke out in parts of the Sudan. The British demanded that Egypt pay an apology fee and withdraw troops from the Sudan. Zaghlul agreed to the first but not the second and resigned.

=== Recognition ===
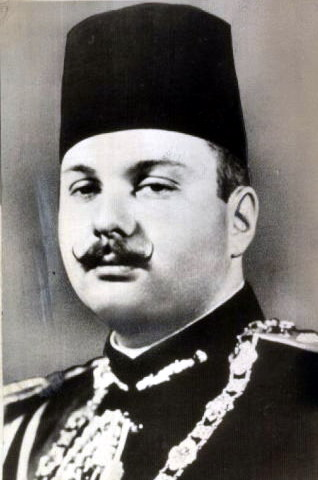
King Farouk I, 1936–1952.

With nationalist sentiment rising, Britain formally recognised Egyptian independence in February 1922, and Hussein Kamel's successor, Sultan Ahmed Fuad I, substituted the title of King for Sultan, becoming King Fuad I of Egypt and Sudan. However, the British influence in Egyptian affairs persisted. Of particular concern to Egypt was Britain's continual efforts to divest Egypt of all control in the Sudan. To both the King and the nationalist movement, this was intolerable, and the Egyptian Government made a point of stressing that Fuad and his son, King Farouk I, were "King of Egypt and Sudan".

=== Second World War ===
The government of Egypt was legally neutral during the Second World War. The army was not in combat. In practice the British made Egypt a major base of operations against Italy and Germany, and finally defeated them both. London's highest priority was control of the Eastern Mediterranean, especially keeping the Suez Canal open for merchant ships and for military connections with India and Australia. Several battles of the North African campaign were fought on Egyptian soil, such as the Italian Invasion of Egypt, Battle of Sidi Barrani or the Battle of Mersa Matruh, First, Second Battles of El Alamein.

The government of Egypt, and the Egyptian population, played a minor role in the Second World War. When the war began in September 1939, Egypt declared martial law and broke off diplomatic relations with Germany. It did not declare war on Germany, but the Prime Minister associated Egypt with the British war effort. It broke off diplomatic relations with the Kingdom of Italy in 1940, but never declared war, even when the Italian Royal Army invaded Egypt. King Farouk practically took a neutral position, which accorded with elite opinion among the Egyptians. The Egyptian army did no fighting. It was apathetic about the war, with the leading officers looking on the British as occupiers and sometimes holding some private sympathies toward the Axis. In June 1940, the King dismissed Prime Minister Aly Maher, who got on poorly with the British. A new coalition government was formed with the Independent Hassan Pasha Sabri as Prime Minister briefly, followed by Hussein Sirri Pasha.

Following a ministerial crisis in February 1942, the British ambassador, Sir Miles Lampson, pressed Farouk to have a Wafd or Wafd-coalition government replace Hussein Sirri Pasha's government. On the night of 4 February 1942, British troops and tanks surrounded Abdeen Palace in Cairo and Lampson presented Farouk with an ultimatum. Farouk capitulated, and Nahhas formed a government shortly thereafter. However, the humiliation meted out to Farouk, and the actions of the Wafd in cooperating with the British and taking power, lost support for both the British and the Wafd among both civilians and, more importantly, the Egyptian military.

=== Post-war period ===
Most British troops were withdrawn to the Suez Canal area in 1947 (the British army maintained a military base there), but nationalist and anti-British sentiment continued to grow after the War. Anti-monarchy sentiments further increased following the disastrous performance of the Kingdom in the 1948 Arab–Israeli War. The 1950 election saw a landslide victory of the nationalist Wafd Party and the King was forced to appoint Mostafa El-Nahas as the new Prime Minister. In 1951 Egypt unilaterally withdrew from the Anglo-Egyptian treaty of 1936 and ordered all remaining British troops to leave the Suez Canal.

=== Suez Emergency ===
According to the BBC, 'In October 1951 a tense stand-off between the British and Egyptian governments broke down over the number of UK troops stationed in the country. In response, the British government mobilised 60,000 troops in 10 days, in what was described as the biggest airlift of troops since World War Two.'

As the British refused to leave their base around the Suez Canal, the Egyptian government cut off the water and refused to allow food into the Suez Canal base, announced a boycott of British goods, forbade Egyptian workers from entering the base and sponsored guerrilla attacks. The situation turned the area around the Suez Canal into a low level war zone. On 24 January 1952, Egyptian guerrillas staged an attack on the British forces around the Suez Canal, during which the Egyptian Auxiliary Police were observed helping the guerrillas. In response, on 25 January, General George Erskine sent British tanks and infantry to surround the auxiliary police station in Ismailia and gave the policemen an hour to surrender their arms in the grounds. The police were arming the guerrillas. The police commander called the Interior Minister, Fouad Serageddin, Nahas's right-hand man, who was smoking cigars in his bath at the time, to ask if he should surrender or fight. Serageddin ordered the police to fight "to the last man and the last bullet". The resulting battle saw the police station levelled and 43 Egyptian policemen killed together with 3 British soldiers. The Ismailia incident outraged Egypt. The next day, 26 January 1952, was "Black Saturday", as the anti-British riot was known. It saw much of downtown Cairo which the Khedive Ismail the Magnificent had rebuilt in the style of Paris, burned down. Farouk blamed the Wafd for the Black Saturday riot, and dismissed Nahas as prime minister the next day and replaced by Aly Maher Pasha.

=== Dissolution ===
On 23 July 1952, the Free Officers Movement, led by Mohamed Naguib and Gamal Abdel Nasser, toppled King Farouk in a coup d'état that began the Egyptian Revolution of 1952. On 26 July, Farouk abdicated in favour of his seven-month-old son, Ahmed Fuad, who became King Fuad II. At 6pm the same day, the now former king departed Egypt on the royal yacht, along with other members of the royal family, including the new infant king. Following precedent for a sovereign under the age of majority, a Regency Council was formed, led by Prince Muhammad Abdel Moneim. The Regency Council, however, held only nominal authority, as real power lay with the Revolutionary Command Council, led by Naguib and Nasser.

Popular expectations for immediate reforms led to the workers' riots in Kafr Dawar on 12 August 1952, which resulted in two death sentences. Following a brief experiment with civilian rule, the Free Officers abolished the monarchy, and declared Egypt a republic on 18 June 1953, abrogating the constitution of 1923. In addition to serving as head of the Revolutionary Command Council, and Prime Minister, Naguib was proclaimed as Egypt's first President, while Nasser was appointed as Deputy Prime Minister.

== Demographics ==
Ethnic Egyptians made up the majority of the population in Egypt. However, thousands of Greeks, Jews, Italians, Maltese, Armenians and Syro-Lebanese were present in Egypt. These communities were known as the Mutamassirun (lit. 'Egyptianized'). Despite the fact these communities were foreigners, they were integrated into Egyptian society and were considered to be homogenous groups by Egyptian nationalists. The Mutammassirun community had most of its members leaving Egypt in the 1950s. After the Suez Crisis of 1956, more than 12,000 of 18,000 people who carried British or French nationality were expelled and were only allowed to take one suitcase with them and a small sum of cash. Rise of antisemitism following the 1948 war coupled alongside those of Arab nationalism and the Muslim Brotherhood also hastened the large-scale exodus of the Mutammassirun, especially those of the Christian faith.

== See also ==
- Egypt
- 1952 Egyptian revolution
- History of modern Egypt
- Muhammad Ali dynasty
- Twenty-seventh Dynasty of Egypt
