= Fuad II of Egypt =

King of Egypt and the Sudan from 1952 to 1953

Fuad II of Egypt: فؤاد الثاني
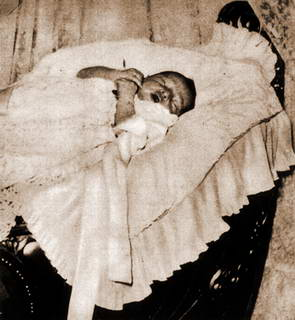
- Pictured after his birth in 1952

King of Egypt and the Sudan
- Reign: 26 July 1952 – 18 June 1953
- Predecessor: Farouk I
- Successor: Monarchy abolished; (Mohamed Naguib as President of Egypt)
- Regent: Muhammad Abdel Moneim

Head of the Royal House of Egypt
- Tenure: 18 March 1965 – present
- Predecessor: Farouk I
- Heir apparent: Muhammad Ali
- Born: 16 January 1952 (age 74); Abdeen Palace, Cairo, Kingdom of Egypt
- Spouse: Dominique-France Loeb-Picard (m. 1976; div. 1996)
- Issue: Muhammad Ali, Prince of the Sa'id; Princess Fawzia-Latifa; Prince Fakhr-Eddin
Names
- Ahmed Fuad II ibn Farouk ibn Ahmed Fuad I ibn Ismail ibn Ibrahim ibn Muhammad Ali
- House: Alawiyya
- Father: Farouk I
- Mother: Narriman Sadek
- Religion: Sunni Islam
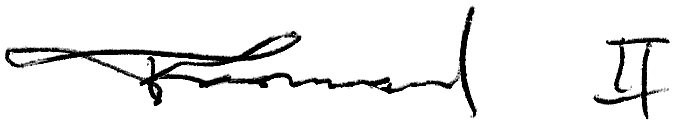
- Signature

Styles of Ahmed Fuad Farouk
- Reference style: His Majesty
- Spoken style: Your Majesty

Fuad II (Arabic: فؤاد الثاني, full name: Ahmed Fuad bin Farouk bin Ahmed Fuad bin Ismail bin Ibrahim bin Muhammad Ali; born 16 January 1952), or alternatively Ahmed Fuad II (Arabic: أحمد فؤاد الثاني), is a member of the Egyptian Muhammad Ali dynasty. As an infant, he formally reigned as the last King of Egypt and the Sudan from July 1952 to June 1953, when he was deposed.

== Birth and reign ==
King Farouk and Queen Narriman with Prince Fuad, January 1952

The son of King Farouk and his second wife Queen Narriman, Crown Prince Ahmed Fuad (Note: Fuad's full name is Ahmed Fuad bin Farouk bin Ismail bin Ibrahim bin Muhammad Ali.) was born on 16 January 1952 in Abdeen Palace. He was delivered at 8:30 a.m. and named after his grandfather Fuad I. Fuad had three half-sisters from Farouk's previous marriage with Queen Farida: princesses Farial, Fawzia and Fadia. As women could not inherit the Egyptian throne, Farouk's first cousin, Prince Mohammed Ali Tewfik, was heir presumptive until Fuad's birth. Immediately following his birth, Fuad was granted the title of Prince of the Sa'id. He was styled accordingly as Ahmed Fuad, Prince of the Sa'id.

On 23 July 1952, the Free Officers led by Mohamed Naguib and Gamal Abdel Nasser started the Egyptian revolution to dispose the Muhammad Ali non-Egyptian dynasty. On 26 July, Farouk was ordered to abdicate in favour of the crown prince and leave Egypt. Farouk abdicated and went into exile in Italy. His family, including Fuad, joined him in exile. By stepping down, Farouk had wished that the forces opposing the monarchy would be placated, and that Fuad could unify the country during his reign.

=== Regency ===
On Farouk's abdication, the army proclaimed that Fuad was now King Fuad II of Egypt and the Sudan, at only 6 months of age. (Note: It was also reported that Fuad was proclaimed as King Ahmed Fuad II of Egypt and the Sudan.) The country was now ruled by Nasser, Naguib and the other Free Officers. Naguib promised to maintain a constitutional monarchy with a regency council holding power until Fuad came of age. Fuad's constitutional powers were assumed by the Cabinet until 2 August 1952, when a regency body, but not a council, was established. Prince Muhammad Abdel Moneim was appointed regent and led the body. The regency body had no actual powers, however, these having been effectively assumed by the Revolutionary Command Council which was led by Naguib. The body was dissolved on 7 September 1952 and Moneim was appointed the sole prince regent, though he still had no actual powers when serving in this role.

The monarchy was formally abolished on 18 June 1953: Egypt was declared a republic for the first time in its history, and Naguib became its first ever President. Fuad was officially deposed and stripped of his royal titles.

== Life in exile ==
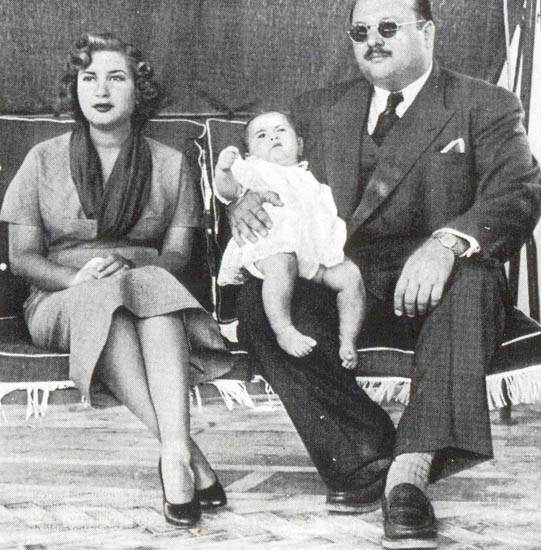
Narriman, Fuad and Farouk in exile in Capri, Italy, 1953

Following Fuad's deposition, Fuad and his half-sisters were sent to live in Switzerland while Farouk remained in Italy, settling in Rome. Queen Narriman returned to Egypt in 1953 after wanting a divorce, and Farouk insisted that Fuad remain abroad. In 1958, Fuad was stripped of his Egyptian citizenship.

Farouk would visit Fuad two or three times each year before the former's unexpected death, possibly from a heart attack, in 1965, when Fuad was 13 years old. Fuad believes that Farouk was "poisoned by enemies". When he died, there were rumours in the press that he had been poisoned by Egyptian intelligence, though there is no known evidence to confirm this. After Farouk's death, Fuad was guaranteed protection by Prince Rainier III of Monaco and his wife Princess Grace. Fuad would later become friends with Rainier in his early adulthood, when he visited Monte Carlo every summer. He owns a Monégasque passport granted to him by Rainier, on which he is named "His Royal Highness Prince Ahmed Fouad Farouk".

Growing up, Fuad and his half-sisters lived in Cully, a small village on Lake Geneva, under the care of a nanny, governess and bodyguard. Fuad attended the local public school where he was bullied and then went to middle school in Lausanne, before later attending the Institut Le Rosey, an elite and prestigious private boarding school. He completed his secondary education, obtaining a French baccalaureate, before studying at the University of Geneva. He graduated with a degree in politics and economics in 1975.

In 1973, President Anwar Sadat lifted Fuad's and his half-sisters' exile. Fuad's Egyptian citizenship was restored in 1974. He has occasionally visited Egypt ever since, with his first visit occurring in 1991. On his Egyptian passport he has no titles and is simply identified as Ahmed Fuad.

== Marriage ==
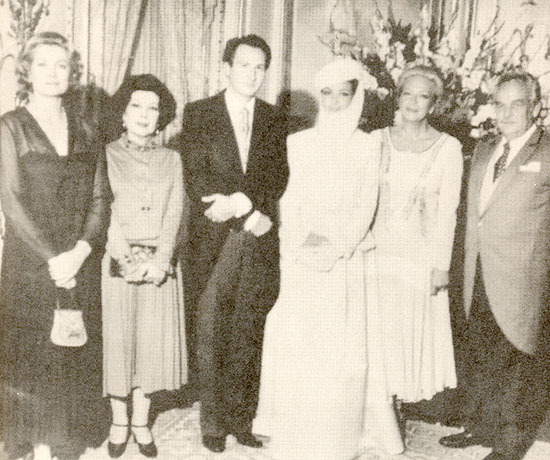
Fuad and Fadila's wedding in 1977

Fuad immigrated to Paris after graduating from university. In Paris, he set up a real estate business and married Dominique-France Loeb-Picard, a Jewish woman of Alsatian origin, in a civil ceremony in Paris on 16 April 1976. She then converted to Sunni Islam, and the two had a religious wedding in Monaco on 5 October 1977. Loeb-Picard changed her name to Fadila Farouk. Egyptian monarchists addressed her as Queen Fadila of Egypt, a nickname coined by the media. She then formally assumed the title of Queen of Egypt. In 1996, she and Fuad divorced, and he stripped her of her title.

After years of divorce proceedings which began in 1999, the marriage was formally dissolved in 2008. Fuad found the divorce "deeply painful" and suffered from depression and poor health. Since the divorce, Fadila has been known as Princess Fadila of Egypt.

=== Issue ===
Fuad and Fadila had three children before their divorce: Prince Muhammad Ali, Prince of the Sa'id (born 5 February 1979), Princess Fawzia-Latifa (born 12 February 1982) and Prince Fakhruddin (born 25 August 1987). The family lived together in Paris until the parents' divorce. After the divorce, Fuad was estranged from his children until c. 2011. Fuad has four grandchildren.

== Later life ==
After his divorce from Fadila, Fuad returned to Switzerland to stay close with his half-sisters.

In May 2010, he recorded a television interview with ONTV and talked about his visits to Egypt, how he felt about the Egyptian people, and their view of his late father.

In an October 2013 interview with L'Illustré, Fuad criticized the Muslim Brotherhood, saying that "the Islamists brought the country to ruin in a few months. [...] They devastated the economy, they wanted to suppress women's rights and allow marriage for girls from the age of nine." He also stated that he would support the candidacy of Field Marshal Abdel Fattah el-Sisi as president of Egypt. In September 2014, Sisi granted him a diplomatic passport with the job description of "former king of Egypt".

In 2023, The Economist reported that some Egyptians were clamoring for his return as Egypt's ruler, as frustration with Sisi's rule deepened.

== See also ==
- List of monarchs of the Muhammad Ali Dynasty
- List of shortest-reigning monarchs

== Notes ==
Fuad II of Egypt Muhammad Ali Dynasty Born: 16 January 1952
Regnal titles
Preceded by Farouk I	King of Egypt and the Sudan; 26 July 1952 – 18 June 1953	Succeeded by Muhammad Naguib as President of Egypt
Egyptian royalty
Preceded by Farouk	Prince of the Sa'id; 16 January 1952 – 26 July 1952	Vacant Title next held by Muhammad Ali
Titles in pretence
Loss of title Monarchy abolished	— TITULAR — King of Egypt and the Sudan; 18 June 1953 – present	Incumbent; Heir apparent: Muhammad Ali
