= List of colonies =

This is a list of territories and polities that have been or are considered colonies.

== Colonies of European countries ==
=== British ===
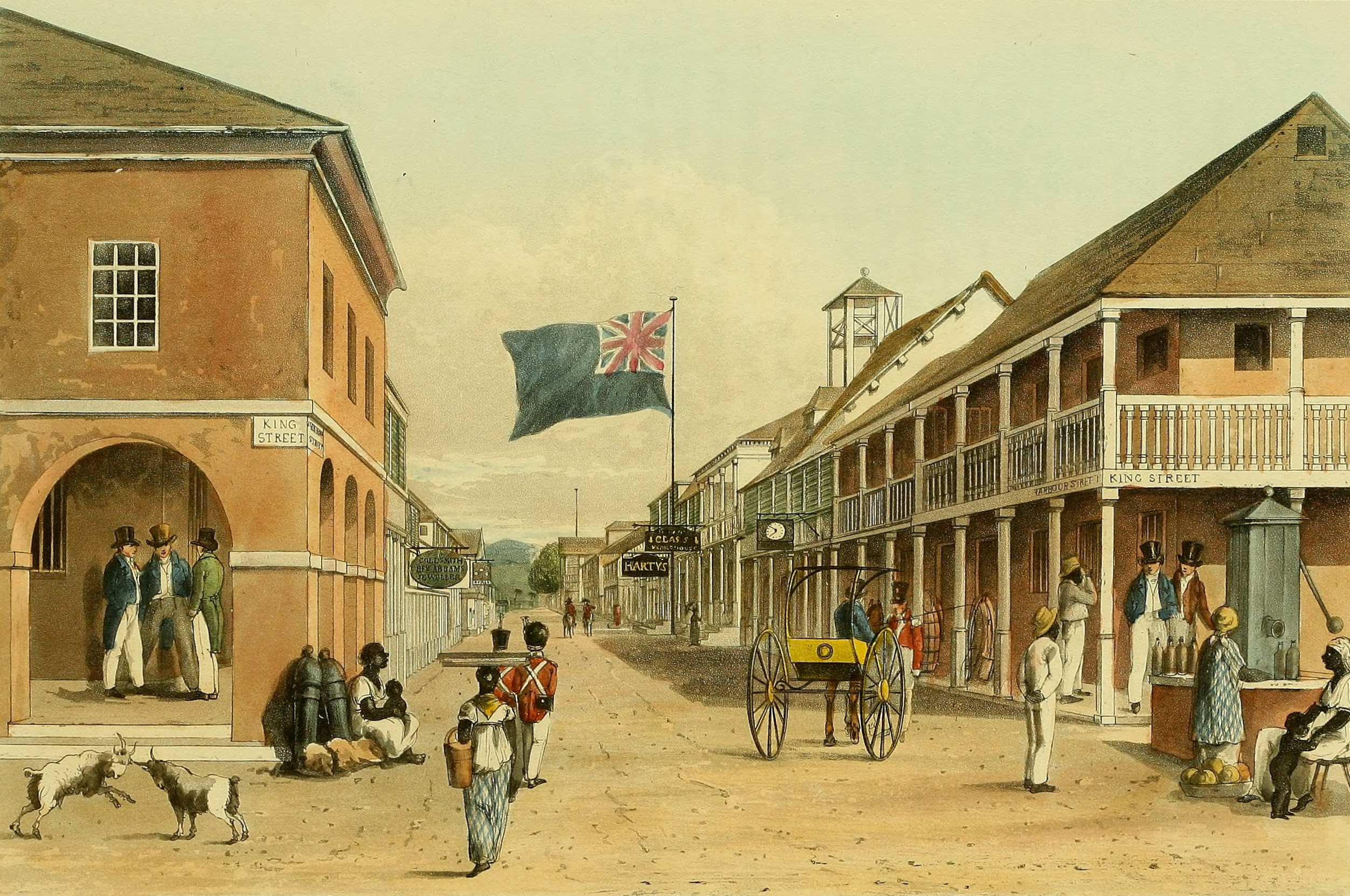
Harbour Street, Kingston, Jamaica, c. 1820

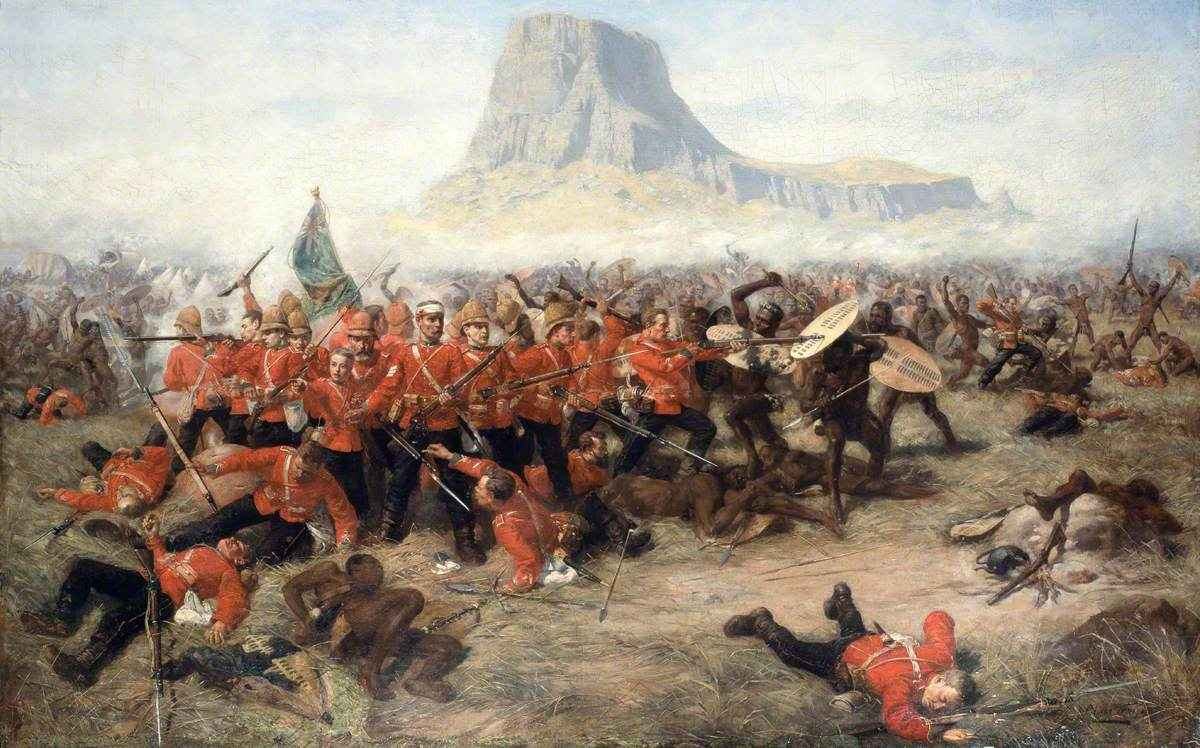
The Battle of Isandlwana during the Anglo-Zulu War of 1879. After an initial defeat the British were able to conquer Zululand.

- Aden Protectorate
- Akrotiri and Dhekelia
- Anglo-Egyptian Sudan
- Ashanti
- Australia
  - Colony of New South Wales
  - Colony of Queensland
  - Colony of Tasmania
  - Colony of Victoria
  - Province of South Australia
  - Swan River Colony
  - Van Diemen's Land
- Basutoland
- British America
  - West Florida
  - Colony of Jamaica
  - Colony of Providence Island
  - Colony of Rhode Island and Providence Plantations
  - Colony of Virginia
  - Connecticut Colony
  - Delaware Colony
  - East Florida
  - Indian Reserve
  - Mosquito Coast
  - New Ireland (Maine)
  - Newfoundland Colony
  - North-Western Territory
  - Province of Carolina
  - Province of Georgia
  - Province of Maryland
  - Province of Massachusetts Bay
  - Province of New Hampshire
  - Province of New Jersey
  - Province of New York
  - Province of North Carolina
  - Province of Pennsylvania
  - Province of Quebec
  - Province of South Carolina
  - Rupert's Land
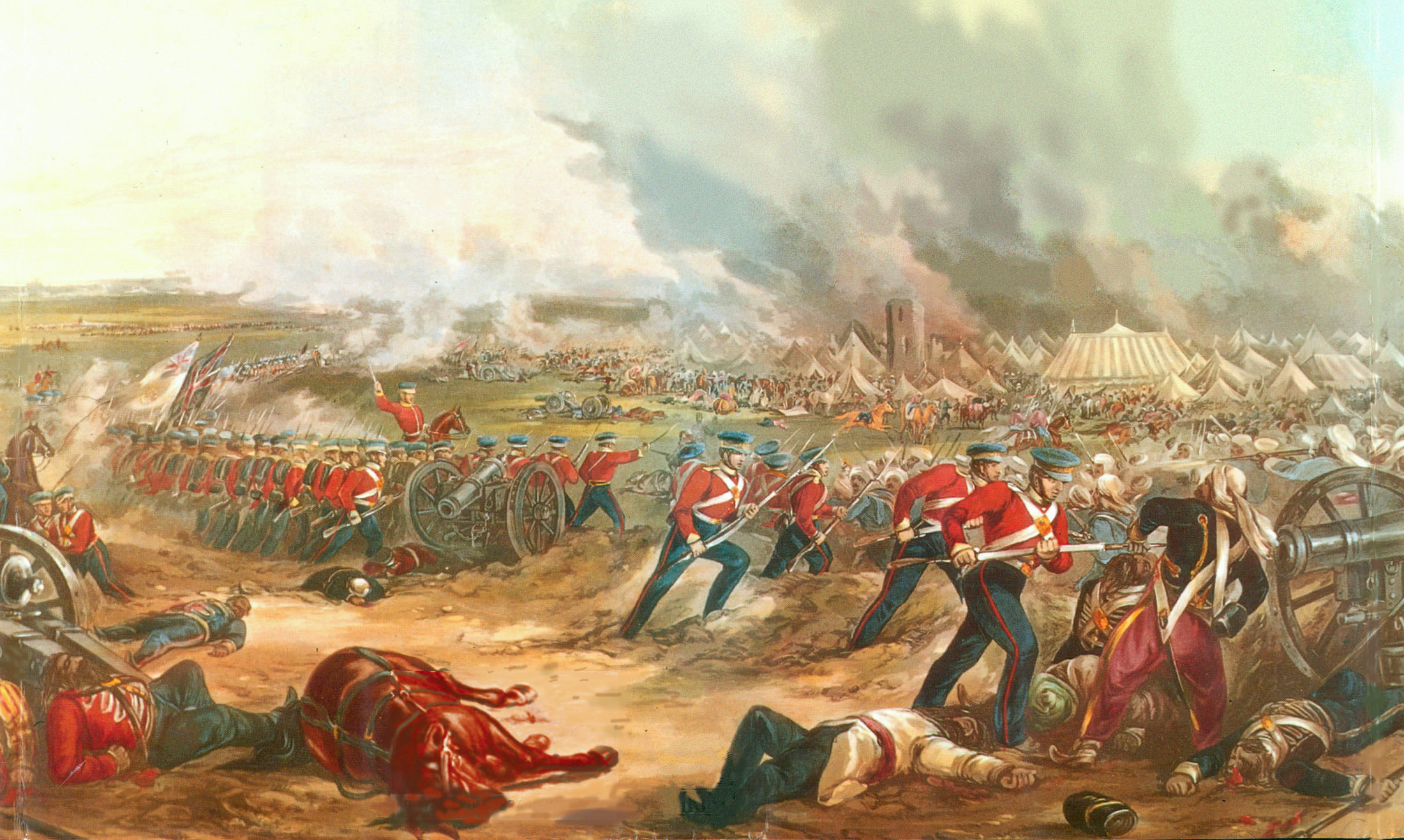
    The First Anglo-Sikh War, 1845–46
- British Bahamas
- British Bechuanaland
- British Bencoolen
- British Borneo
  - Brunei
  - Crown Colony of Labuan
  - Crown Colony of North Borneo
  - Crown Colony of Sarawak
  - North Borneo
  - Raj of Sarawak
- British Cameroons
- British Ceylon
- British Cyprus
- British Guinea
- British Guiana
- British Honduras
- British Hong Kong
- British Indian Ocean Territory
- British Kaffraria
- British Leeward Islands
  - Antigua-Barbuda-Montserrat
  - Anguilla
  - British Virgin Islands
  - Montserrat
  - Saint Christopher-Nevis-Anguilla
- British Malaya
  - Federated Malay States
  - Straits Settlements
  - Unfederated Malay States
- British Mauritius
- British North America
  - Colony of British Columbia (1858–1866)
  - Colony of British Columbia (1866–1871)
  - Colony of the Queen Charlotte Islands
  - Colony of Vancouver Island
  - Lower Canada
  - Newfoundland Colony
  - Province of Canada
  - Stickeen Territories
  - Upper Canada
- British occupation of Manila
- British Raj
  - Aden Province
  - Ajmer-Merwara
  - Assam Province
  - Baluchistan Agency
  - Bengal Presidency
  - Bombay Presidency
  - Bihar and Orissa Province
  - Bihar Province
  - British rule in Burma
  - Central Provinces
  - Central Provinces and Berar
  - Coorg Province
  - Eastern Bengal and Assam
  - Madras Presidency
  - Nagpur Province
  - North-West Frontier Province
  - Orissa Province
  - Punjab Province (British India)
  - Panth Piploda Province
  - Sind Province (1936–1955)
  - United Provinces (1937–1950)
  - Princely States
- British rule in Ireland
  - Kingdom of Ireland
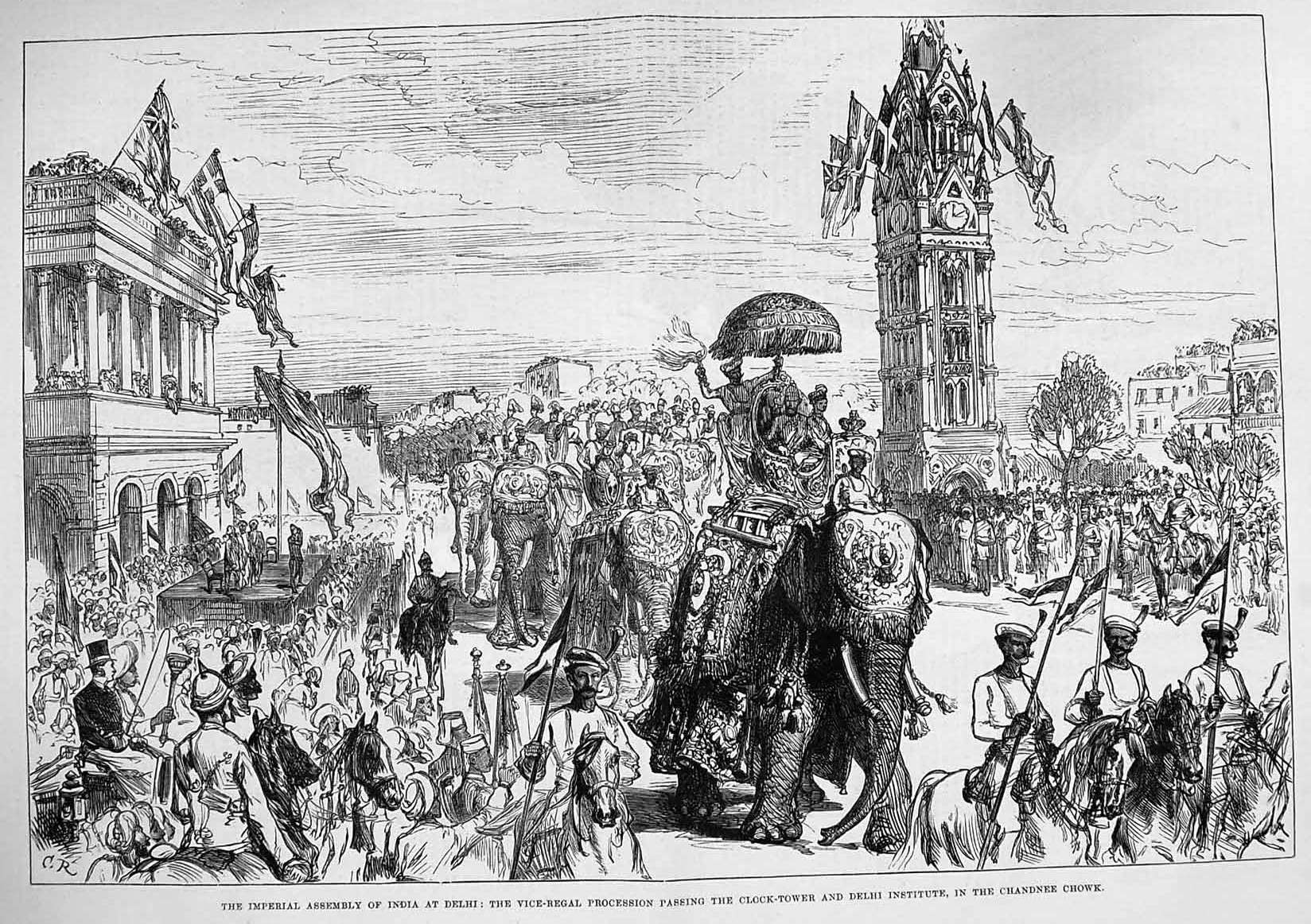
    The Delhi Durbar of 1877: the proclamation of Queen Victoria as Empress of India
- British New Guinea
- British Solomon Islands
- British Somaliland
- British Togoland
- British Windward Islands
- British Weihaiwei
- Aden Colony
- Cape Colony
- Colonial Nigeria
  - Federation of Nigeria
  - Lagos Colony
  - Niger Coast Protectorate
  - Northern Nigeria Protectorate
  - Southern Nigeria Protectorate
- Cook Islands Federation
- Colony of Fiji
- Colony of Natal
- Colony of New Zealand
- Crown Colony of Penang
- Crown Colony of the Seychelles
- Colony of Singapore
- Crown Colony of Malacca
- Crown Colony of Malta
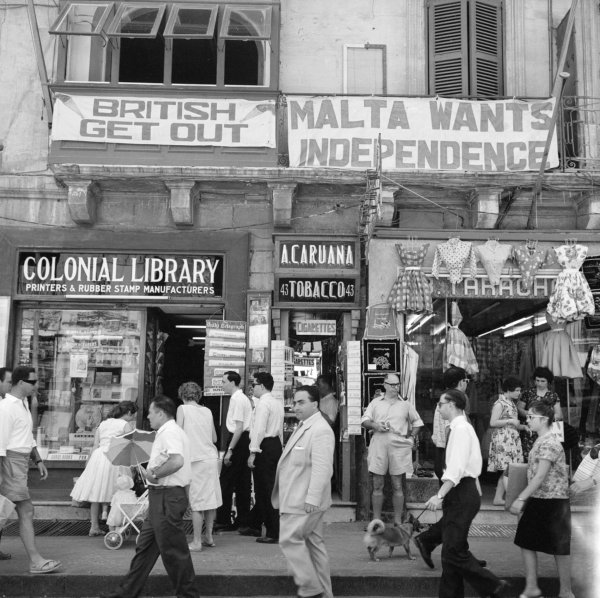
  A view of shops with anti-British and pro-Independence signs, Malta, c. 1960
- British concession of Tianjin
- British Concession of Jiujiang
- British Concession at Amoy
- British Concession (Shanghai)
- British Central Africa Protectorate
- Bermuda
- Bahrain and its Dependencies
- Bechuanaland Protectorate
- Barotziland–North-Western Rhodesia
- Berbice
- Canton and Enderbury Islands (condominium with the US)
- Cayman Islands
- Dominion of New Zealand
- Dominion of Newfoundland
- Demerara-Essequibo
- East Africa Protectorate
- Emirate of Afghanistan (de jure)
- Emirate of Transjordan
- Emirate of Kuwait
- Falkland Islands
- Falkland Islands Dependencies
- French and British interregnum in the Dutch East Indies
- Federation of Malaya
- Federation of the Emirates of South Arabia
- Federation of South Arabia
- Federation of Rhodesia and Nyasaland
- Gambia Colony and Protectorate
- Gibraltar
- Gilbert and Ellice Islands
- Gold Coast
- Griqualand East
- Griqualand West
- History of Egypt under the British
- Kenya Colony
- Kingdom of Rarotonga
- Kingdom of Tonga
- Kulangsu International Settlement
- Khedivate of Egypt (de facto)
- Mandatory Iraq
- Mandatory Palestine
- Muscat and Oman
- Malayan Union
- Malta Protectorate
- New Hebrides (condominium with France)
- North-Eastern Rhodesia
- Northern Rhodesia
- Northern Territories of the Gold Coast
- Nyasaland
- Orange River Sovereignty
- Orange River Colony
- Oregon Country
- Pitcairn Islands
- Protectorate of Uganda
- Protectorate of South Arabia
- Saint Helena, Ascension and Tristan da Cunha
  - Ascension Island
  - Saint Helena
  - Tristan da Cunha
- Sultanate of Egypt
- Sultanate of Zanzibar
- Sultanate of the Maldive Islands
- Shanghai International Settlement
- Sierra Leone Colony and Protectorate
- South Georgia and the South Sandwich Islands
- Southern Rhodesia
- St. Peter's Colony
- Transvaal Colony
- Tanganyika Territory
- Turks and Caicos Islands
- Trucial States
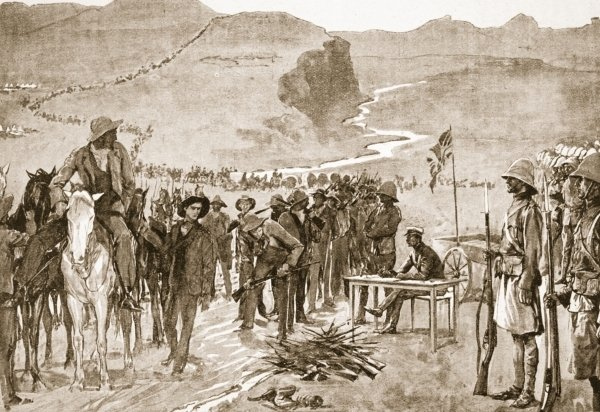
  The result of the Boer Wars was the annexation of the Boer Republics to the British Empire in 1902
- Union of South Africa
- United States of the Ionian Islands
- West Indies Federation
- Wituland
- Zimbabwe Rhodesia (de facto)

=== French ===
- Acadia
- Canada (New France)
- Clipperton Island
- Collectivity of Saint Martin
- De Rays Expedition
- Equinoctial France
- France Antarctique
- French Algeria
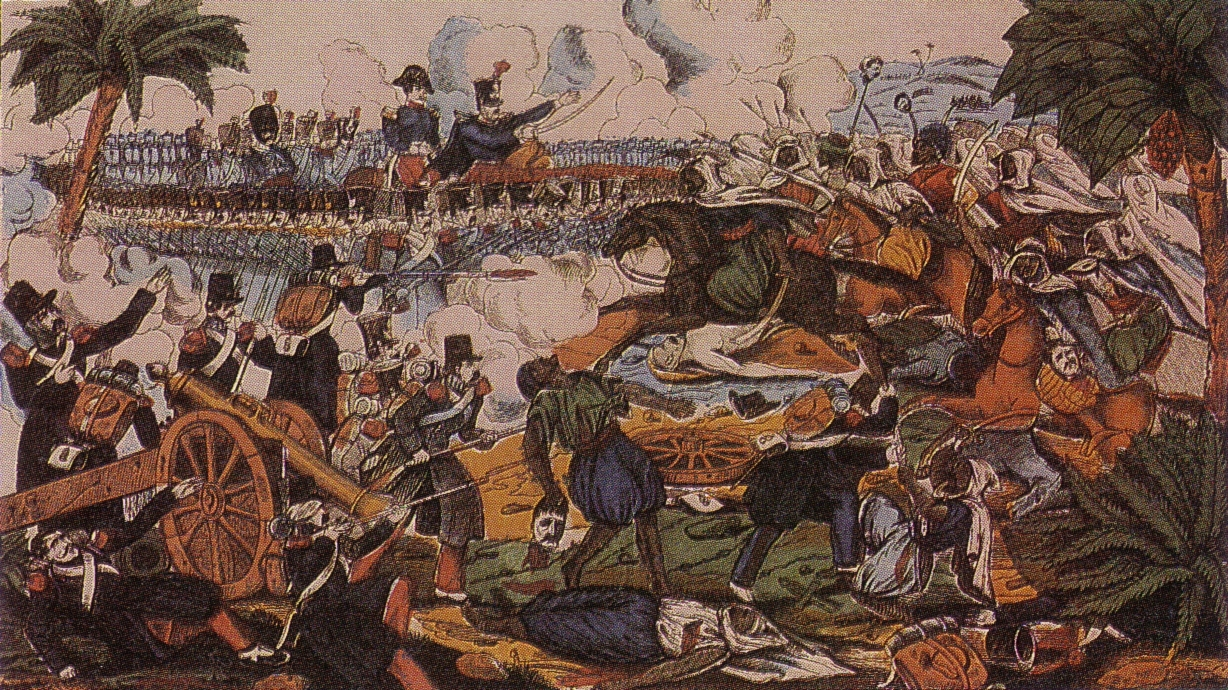
  Siege of Constantine (1836) during the French conquest of Algeria.
- French and British interregnum in the Dutch East Indies
- French Cameroon
- French concession of Hankou
- French Equatorial Africa
  - French Chad
  - French Congo
  - Ubangi-Shari
- French Guiana
- French India
- French Indochina
  - Annam
  - French Cochinchina
  - French protectorate of Cambodia
  - French protectorate of Laos
  - Tonkin

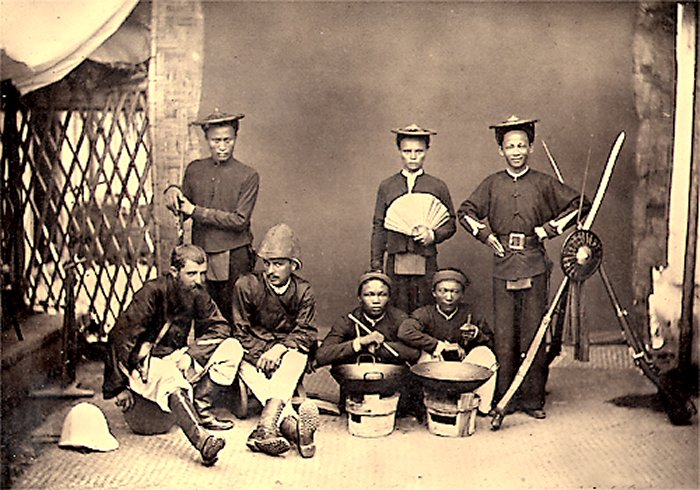
French officers and Tonkinese riflemen, 1884

- French Madagascar
- French protectorate in Morocco
- French protectorate of Tunisia
- French Polynesia
- French Somaliland
- French Southern and Antarctic Lands
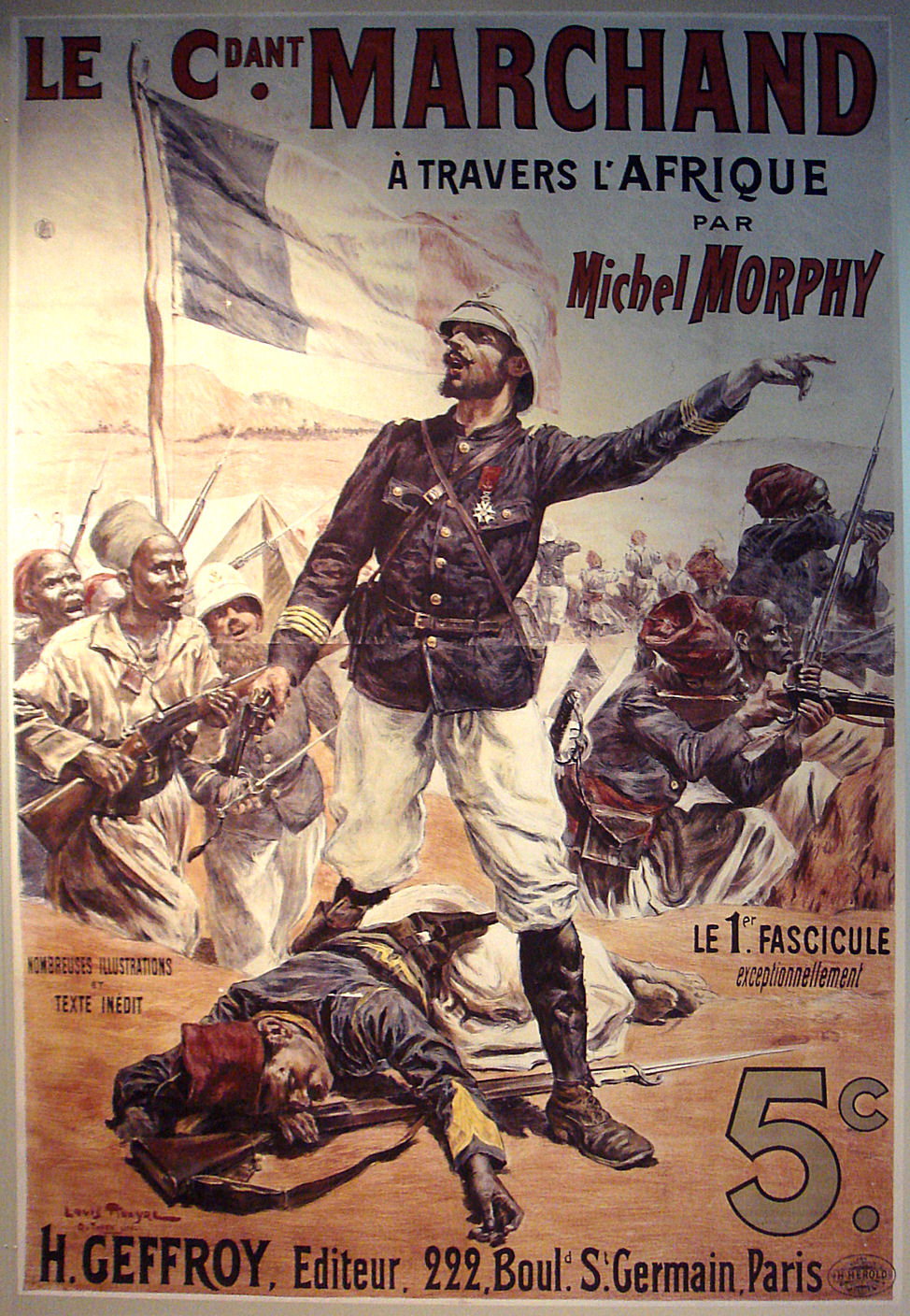
  Contemporary illustration of Major Marchand's trek across Africa in 1898
- French West Africa
  - Colonial Mauritania
  - Colony of Niger
  - French Dahomey
  - French Guinea
  - French Sudan
  - French Upper Volta
- Guadeloupe
- Inini
- Kingdom of Araucanía and Patagonia
- Leased Territory of Guangzhouwan
- Louisiana (New France)
- Mandate for Syria and the Lebanon
  - Alawite State
  - Greater Lebanon
  - Jabal Druze State
  - State of Syria (1925–1930)
- Martinique
- New Caledonia
- New Hebrides (condominium with Britain)
- Réunion
- Saint Barthélemy
- Saint-Domingue
- Saint Pierre and Miquelon
- Shanghai French Concession
- Wallis and Futuna

=== Russian ===
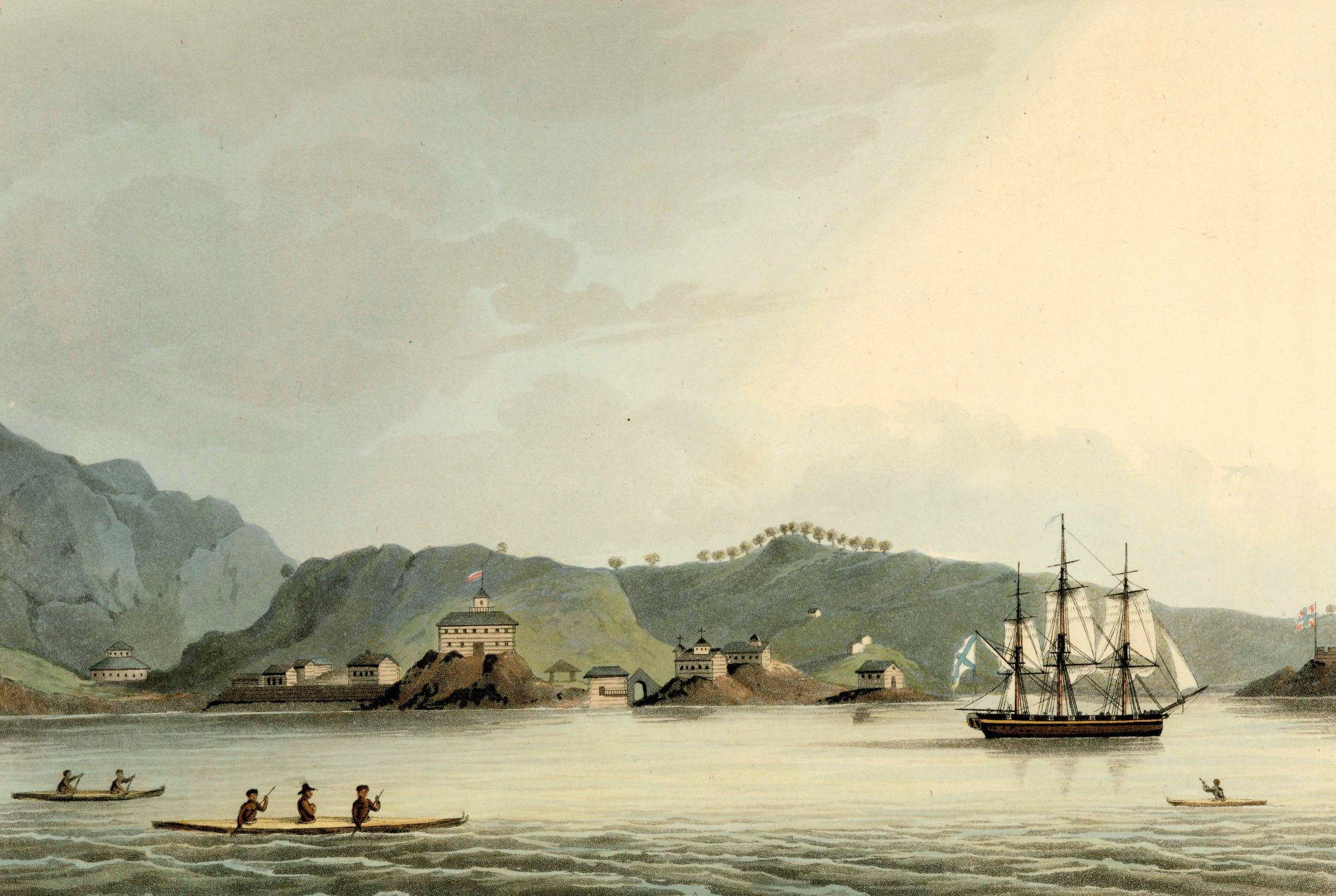
The Russian settlement of St. Paul's Harbour (present-day Kodiak, Alaska), Russian America, 1814

- Fort Ross
- Russian America
- Russian concession of Tianjin
- Russian Dalian
- Sagallo

=== German ===
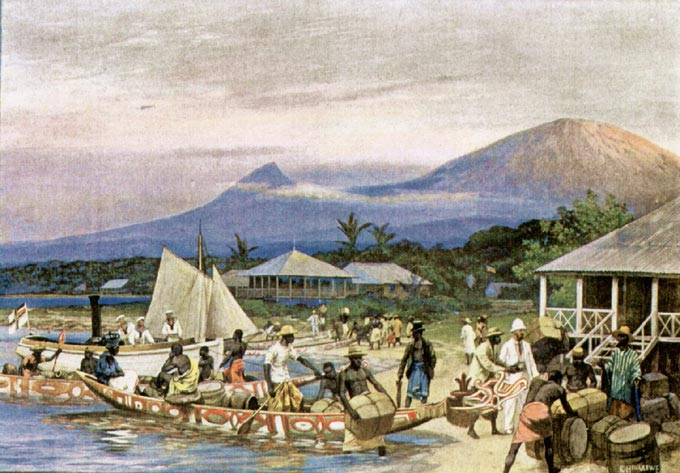
Kamerun (by R. Hellgrewe, 1908)

- Adelsverein
- Brandenburger Gold Coast
- German concession of Tianjin
- German East Africa
- German New Guinea
- German Samoa
- German South West Africa
- Kamerun
- Kapitaï and Koba
- Kiautschou Bay Leased Territory
- Klein-Venedig
- Mahinland
- New Swabia
- North Solomon Islands
- Togoland
- Wituland

=== Italian ===
The Italian invasion of Libya during the Italo-Turkish War, 1911

- Italian Islands of the Aegean
- Italian protectorate of Albania
- Italian concession of Tianjin
- Italian East Africa
  - Italian Eritrea
  - Italian Ethiopia
  - Italian Somaliland
  - Oltre Giuba (briefly; annexed)
- Italian Libya
  - Italian Tripolitania
  - Italian Cyrenaica

=== Dutch ===
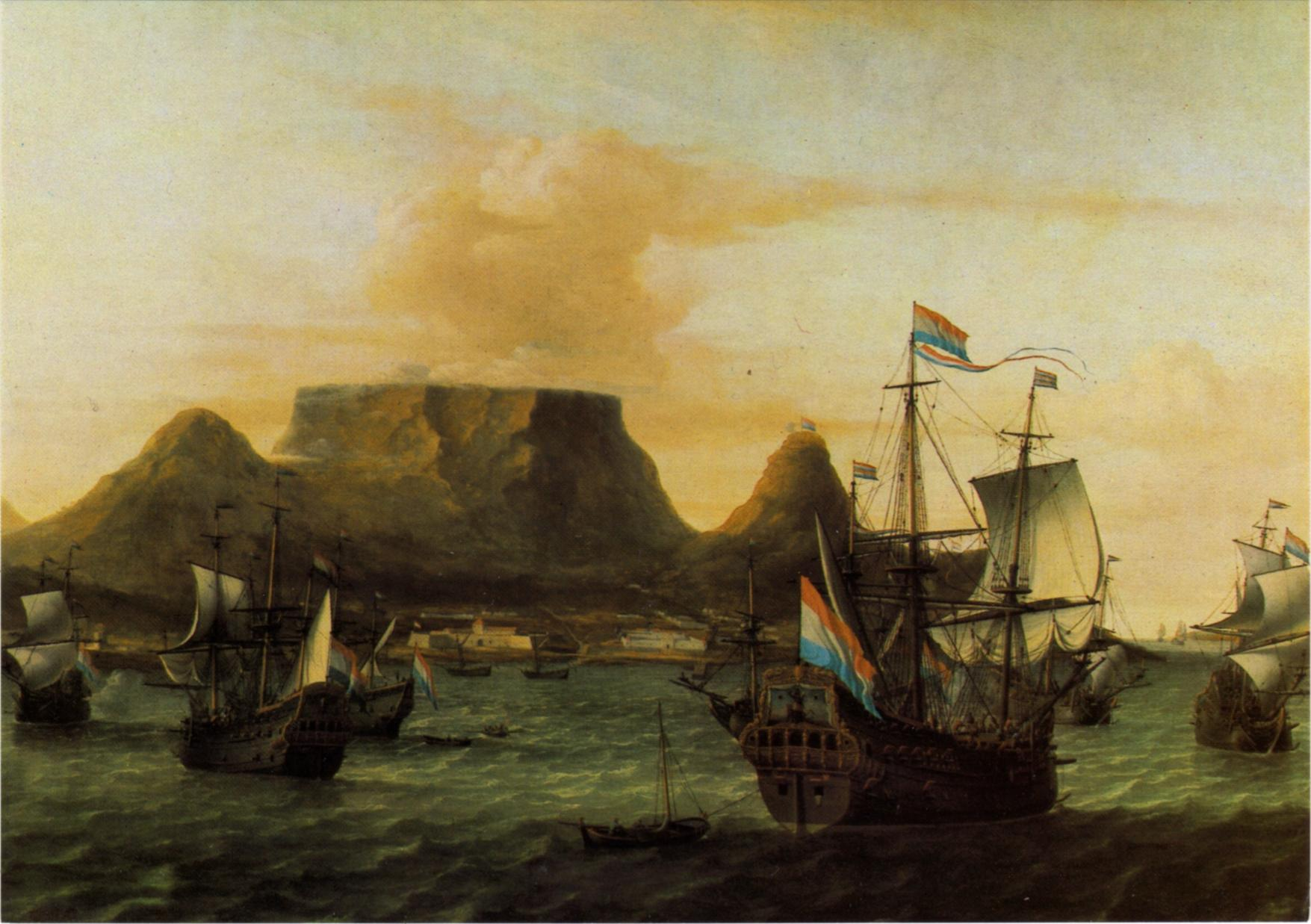
View of Cape Town with ships of the Dutch East India Company (VOC), c. 1683

- Aruba
- Bonaire
- Curaçao
- Dutch Brazil
- Dutch Cape Colony
- Dutch Ceylon
- Dutch East Indies
- Dutch Formosa
- Dutch Malacca
- Dutch New Guinea
- Saba
- Senegambia (Dutch West India Company)
- Sint Eustatius
- Sint Maarten
- Surinam (Dutch colony)

=== Portuguese ===
- Azores
- Colonial Brazil
- Madeira
- Portuguese Angola
- Portuguese Cape Verde
- Portuguese Ceylon
- Portuguese Guinea
- Portuguese India
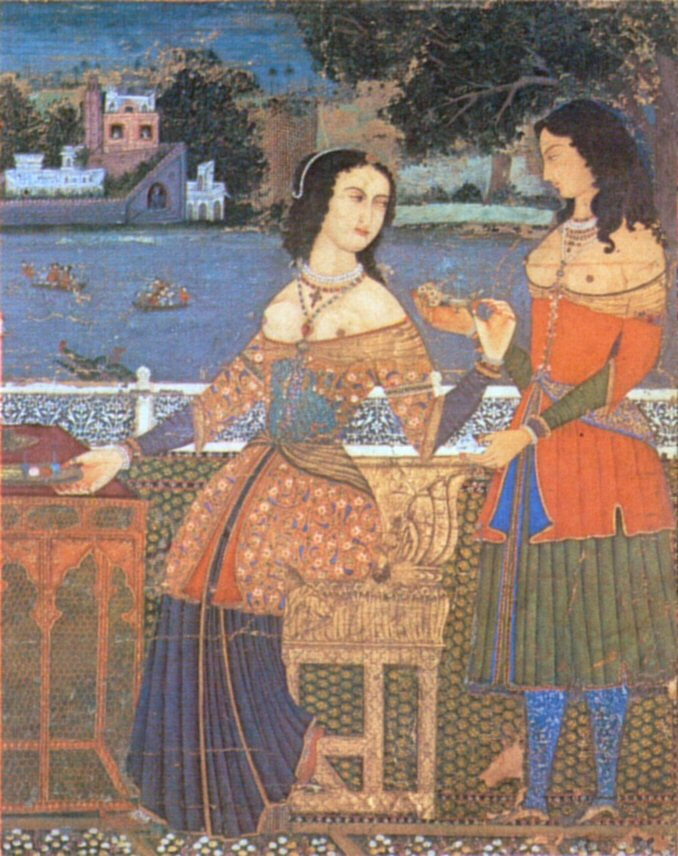
  Portuguese women in Goa, India, early 18th century
- Portuguese Macau
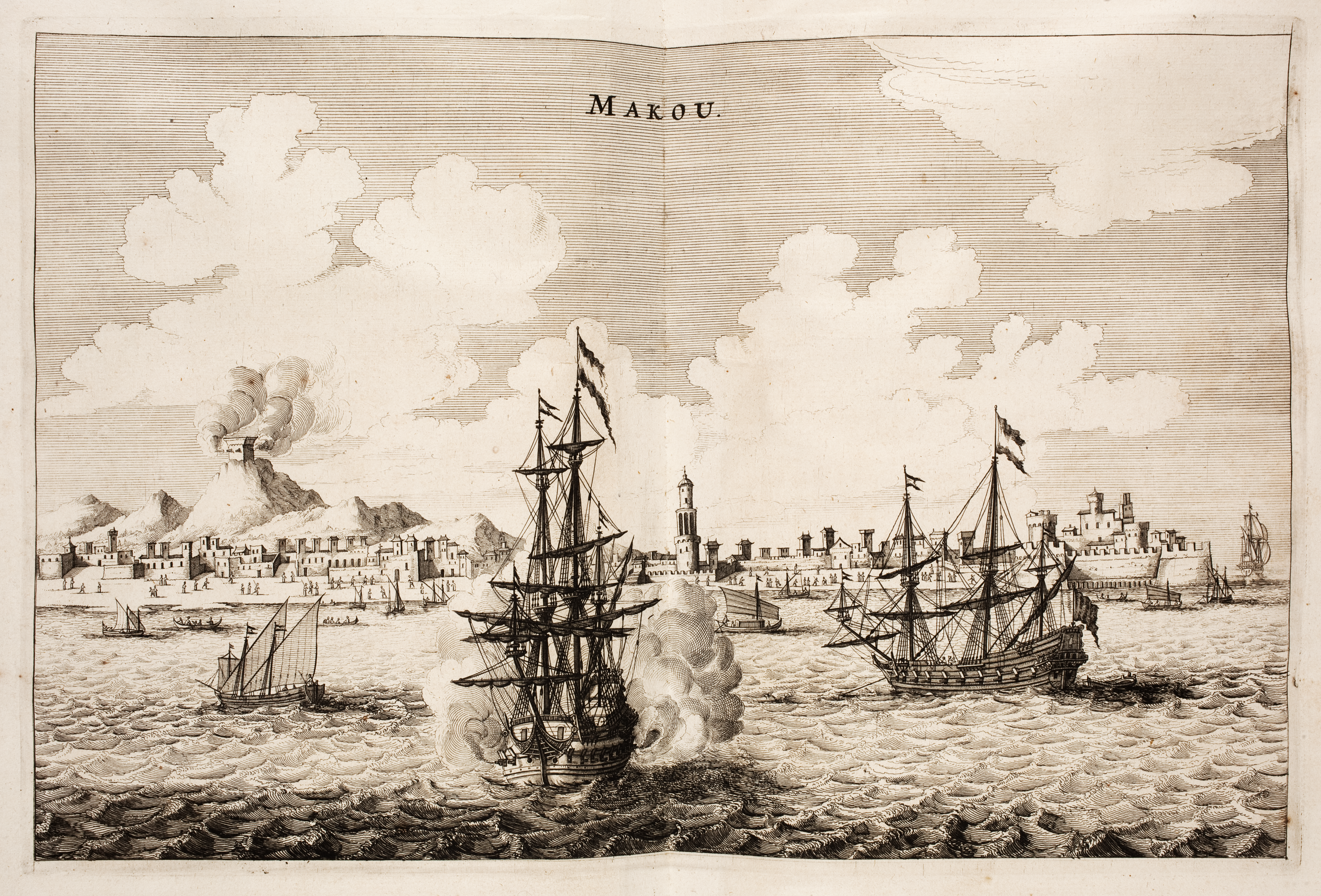
  Battle of Macau, 21–24 June 1622. Portuguese repel Dutch attack.
- Portuguese Malacca
- Portuguese Mozambique
- Portuguese Nagasaki
- Portuguese Oman
- Portuguese São Tomé and Príncipe
- Portuguese Timor

=== Spanish ===
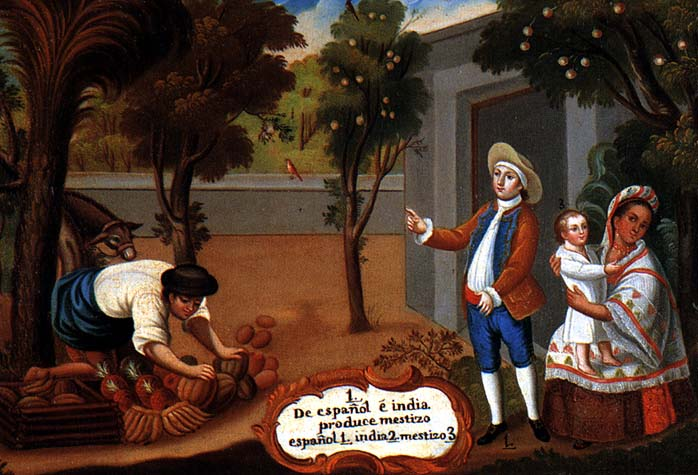
An 18th-century casta painting from New Spain shows a Spanish man and his indigenous wife.

- Canary Islands
- Captaincy General of Cuba
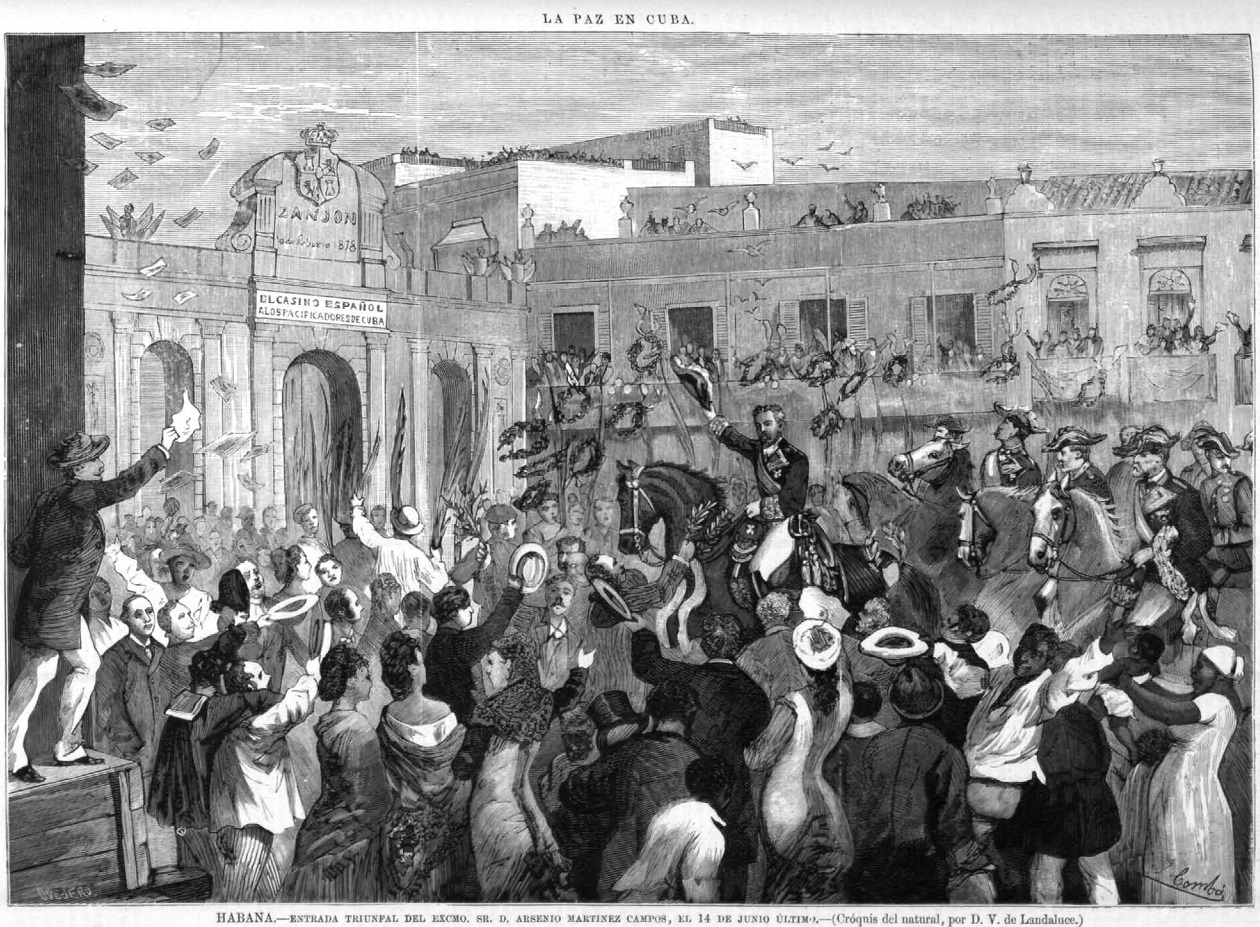
  Spanish General Arsenio Martínez Campos in Havana, Colonial Cuba, 1878
  - Louisiana (New Spain)
  - Spanish Florida
- Captaincy General of the Philippines
- Ifni
- New Spain
  - Captaincy General of Guatemala
  - Captaincy General of Yucatán
  - Captaincy General of Santo Domingo
  - Captaincy General of Puerto Rico
  - Spanish Formosa
- Río de Oro
- Saguia el-Hamra
- Spanish Oran
- Spanish protectorate in Morocco
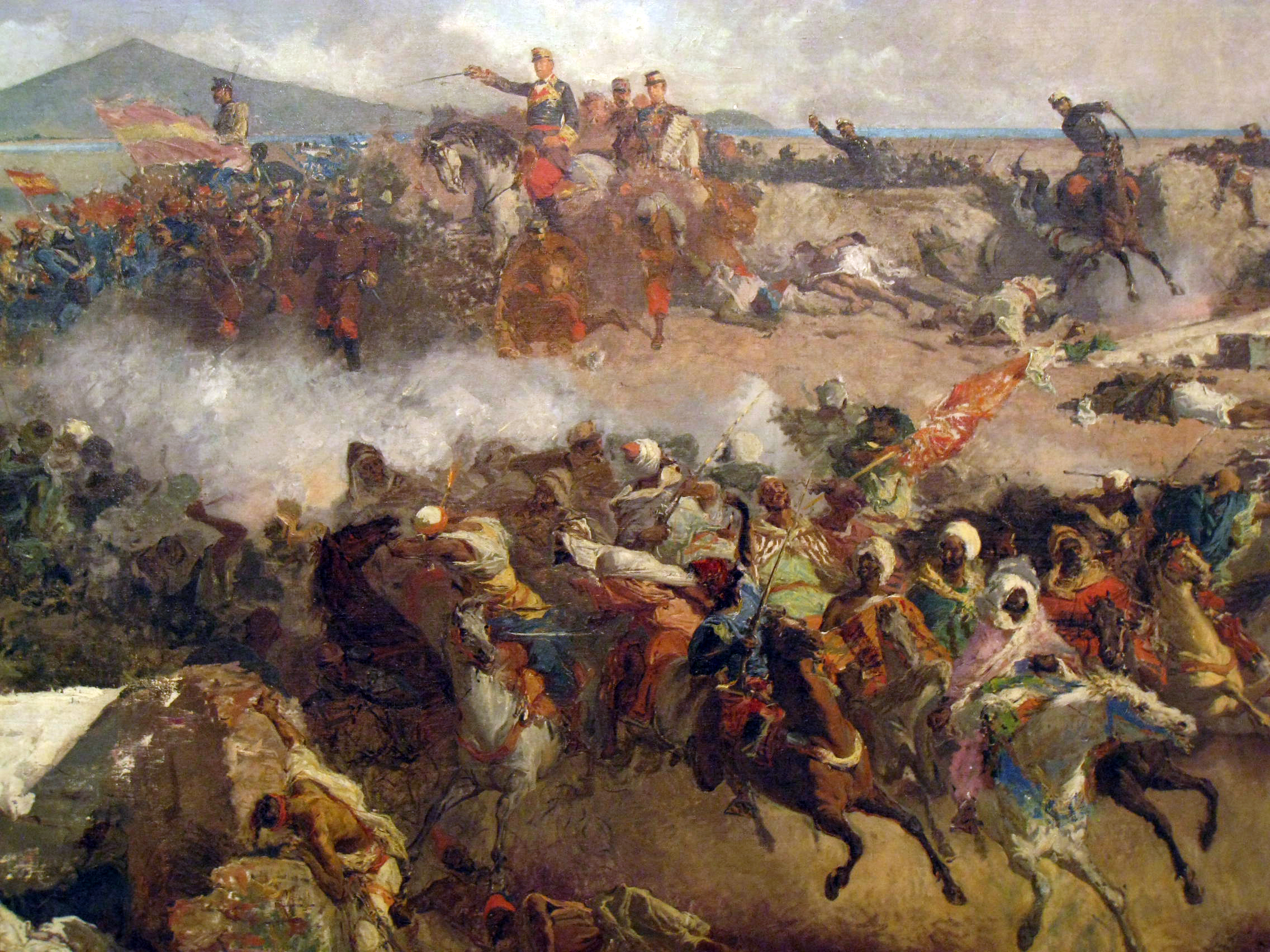
  The Battle of Tétouan, 1860, by Marià Fortuny
- Spanish Sahara
- Spanish Tripoli
- Viceroyalty of Peru
  - Captaincy General of Chile
- Viceroyalty of New Granada
  - Captaincy General of Venezuela
- Viceroyalty of the Río de la Plata
  - Spanish Guinea

=== Austrian ===
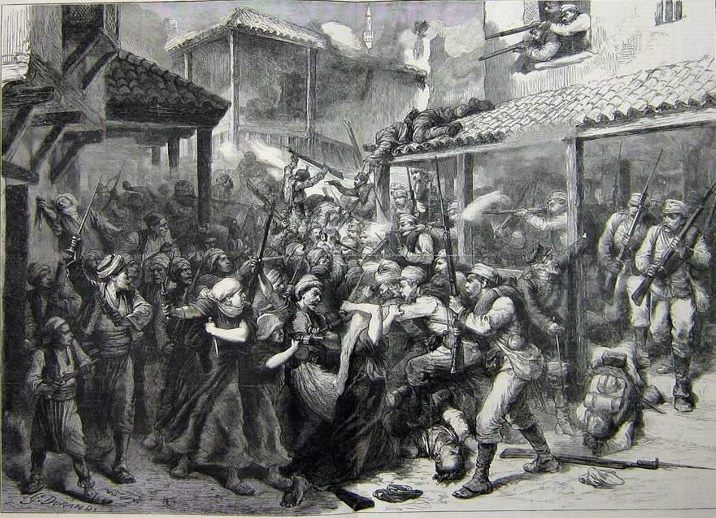
Muslim Bosniak resistance during the battle of Sarajevo in 1878 against the Austro-Hungarian occupation

- Austro-Hungarian concession of Tianjin
- Austro-Hungarian rule in Bosnia and Herzegovina

=== Danish ===
- Danish Gold Coast
- Danish India
- Danish West Indies
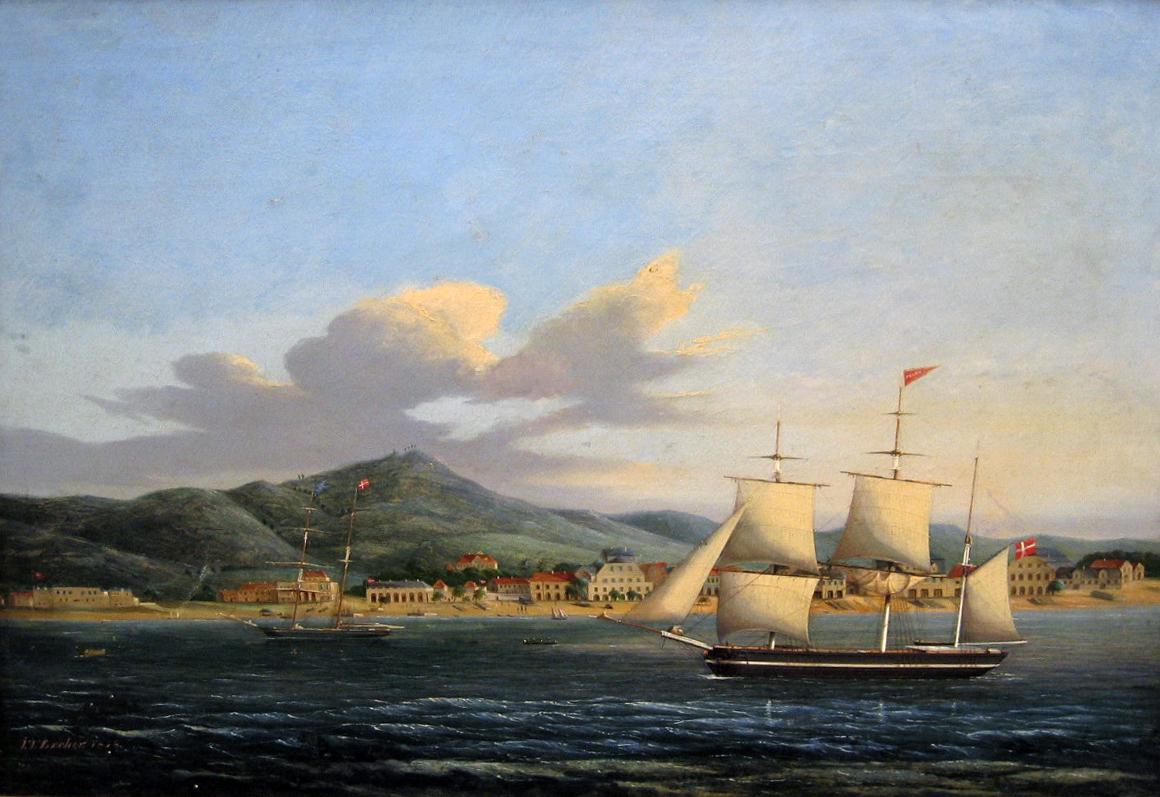
  Frederiksstad on Saint Croix, Danish West Indies, 1848
- Faroe Islands
- Greenland

=== Belgian ===
- Belgian concession of Tianjin
- Belgian Congo
- Ruanda-Urundi

=== Swedish ===
- New Sweden
- Saint Barthélemy
- Swedish Gold Coast

=== Norse ===
- Eastern Settlement
- Helluland
- Markland
- Vinland
- Western Settlement

=== Norwegian ===
- Bouvet Island
- Jan Mayen
- Peter I Island
- Queen Maud Land
- Svalbard

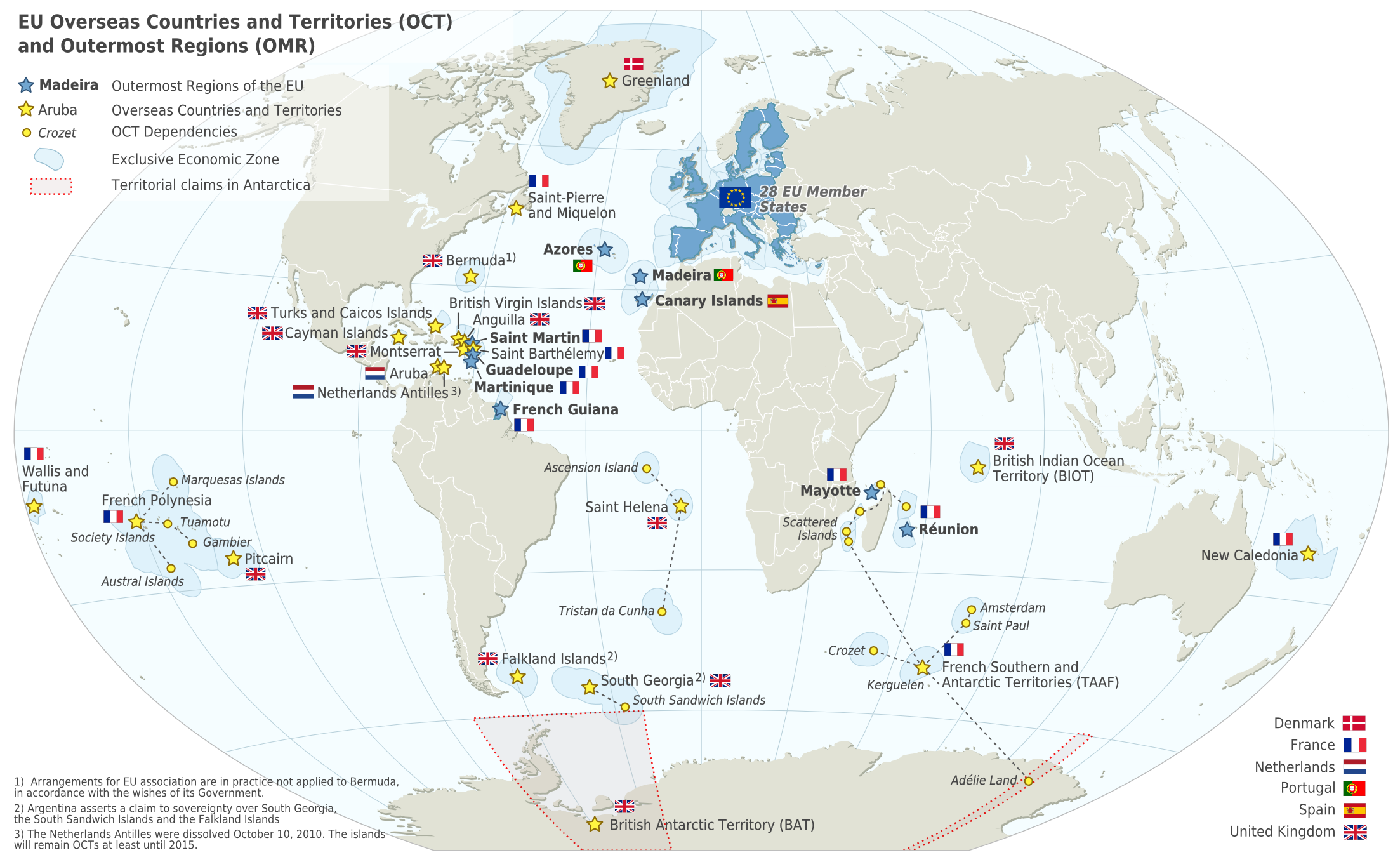
Map of the European Union in the world, with Overseas Countries and Territories and Outermost Regions.

== Colonies by Oceanian countries ==
=== Australian ===
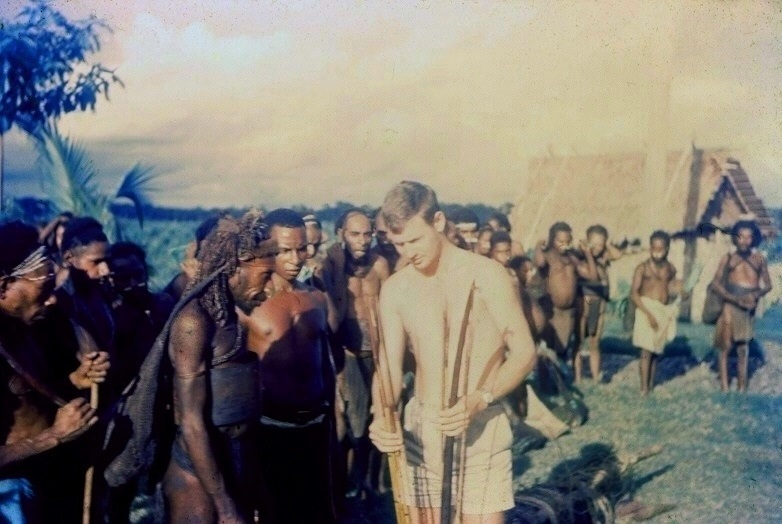
Australian patrol officer in Australia's Territory of Papua and New Guinea in 1964

- Australian Antarctic Territory
- Christmas Island
- Cocos (Keeling) Islands
- Coral Sea Islands
- Heard Island and McDonald Islands
- Norfolk Island
- Territory of New Guinea
- Territory of Papua
- Territory of Papua and New Guinea

=== New Zealander ===
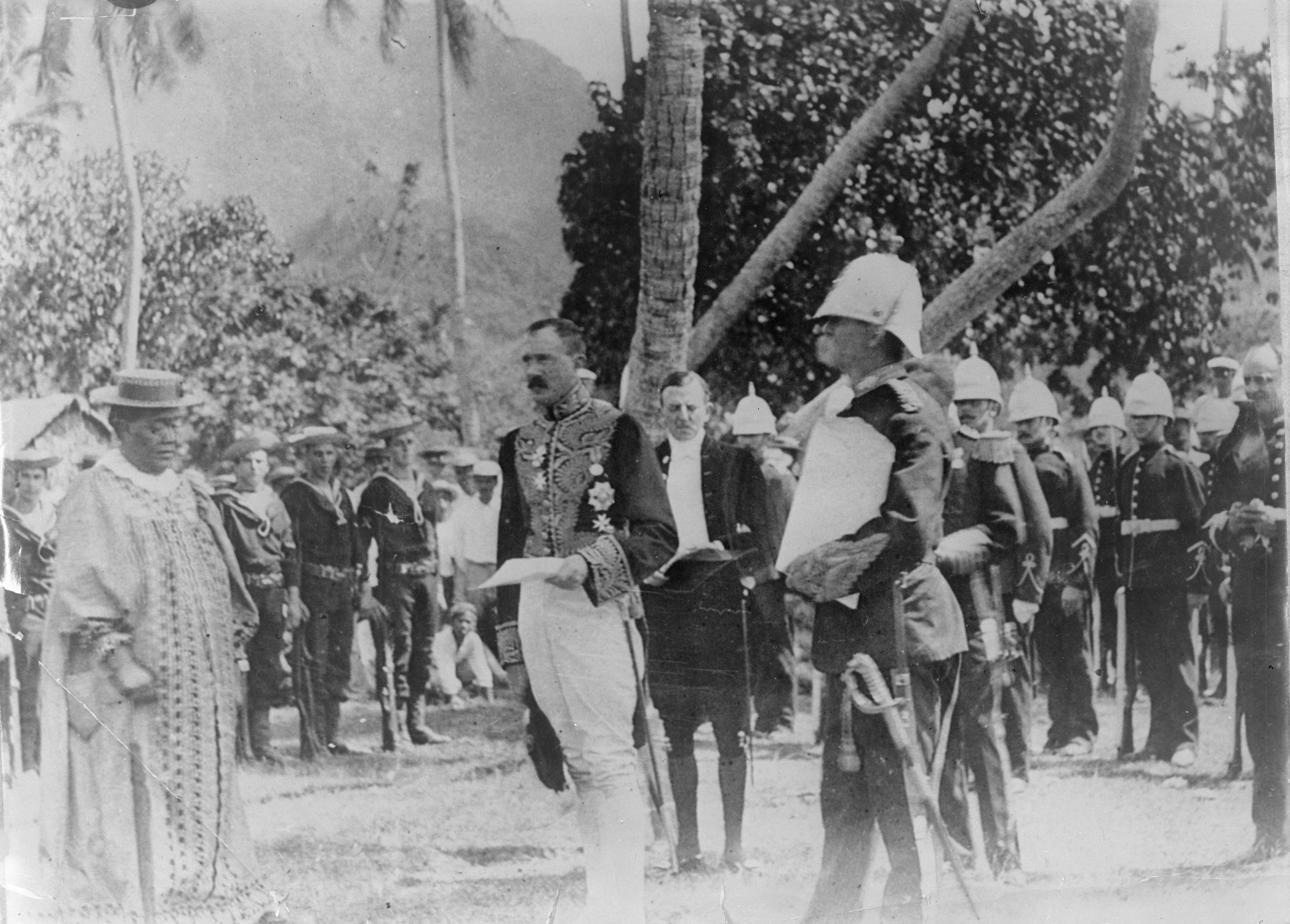
Governor Lord Ranfurly reading the annexation proclamation to Queen Makea on 7 October 1900.

- Cook Islands
- Niue
- Ross Dependency
- Tokelau
- Territory of Western Samoa

== Colonies by Asian countries ==
=== Japanese ===
- Karafuto Prefecture
- Korea under Japanese rule
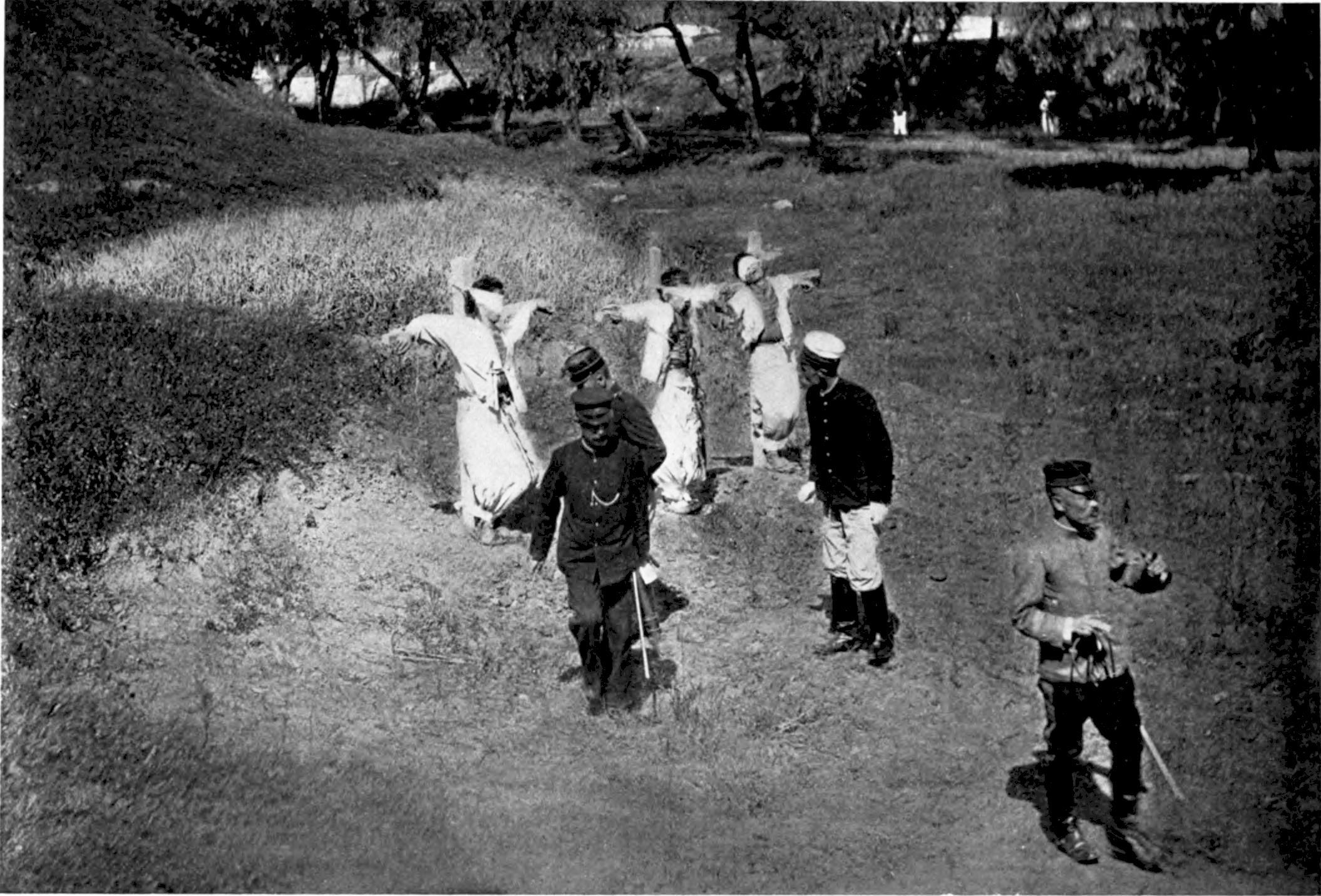
  Three Koreans shot for pulling up rails as a protest against seizure of land without payment by the Japanese
- Kwantung Leased Territory
- Manchukuo
- South Seas Mandate
- Taiwan under Japanese rule

== Colonies by Pan-American countries ==
=== American ===
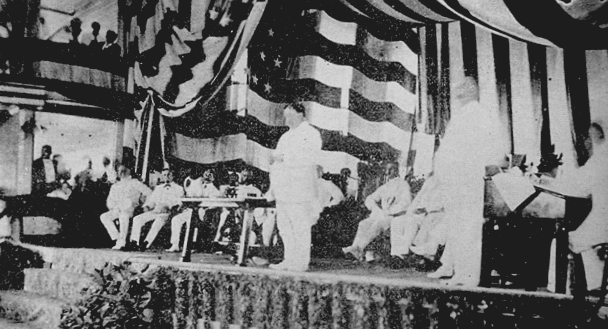
Governor General William Howard Taft addressing the audience at the Philippine Assembly in the Manila Grand Opera House

- American Concession in Tianjin (1869–1902)
- American Concession in Shanghai (1848–1863)
- American Samoa
- Canton and Enderbury Islands
- Guam
- Indian Territory (1834–1907)
- Kulangsu International Settlement (1902–1943)
- Liberia (Independent since 1847, US protectorate until post-WW2)
- Midway
- Northern Mariana Islands
- Palau
- Palmyra Atoll
- Panama Canal Zone (1903–1979)
- Peking Legation Quarter (1862–1941, 1945–1950)
- Philippines (1898–1946)
- Puerto Rico
- Shanghai International Settlement (1863–1943)
- Tangier International Zone (now Tangier, Morocco) (1924–1956)
- Trust Territory of the Pacific Islands
- United States Virgin Islands
- Wake Island

=== Mexican ===
- Clipperton Island
- Revillagigedo Islands

=== Ecuadorian ===
- Galápagos Islands

=== Argentine ===
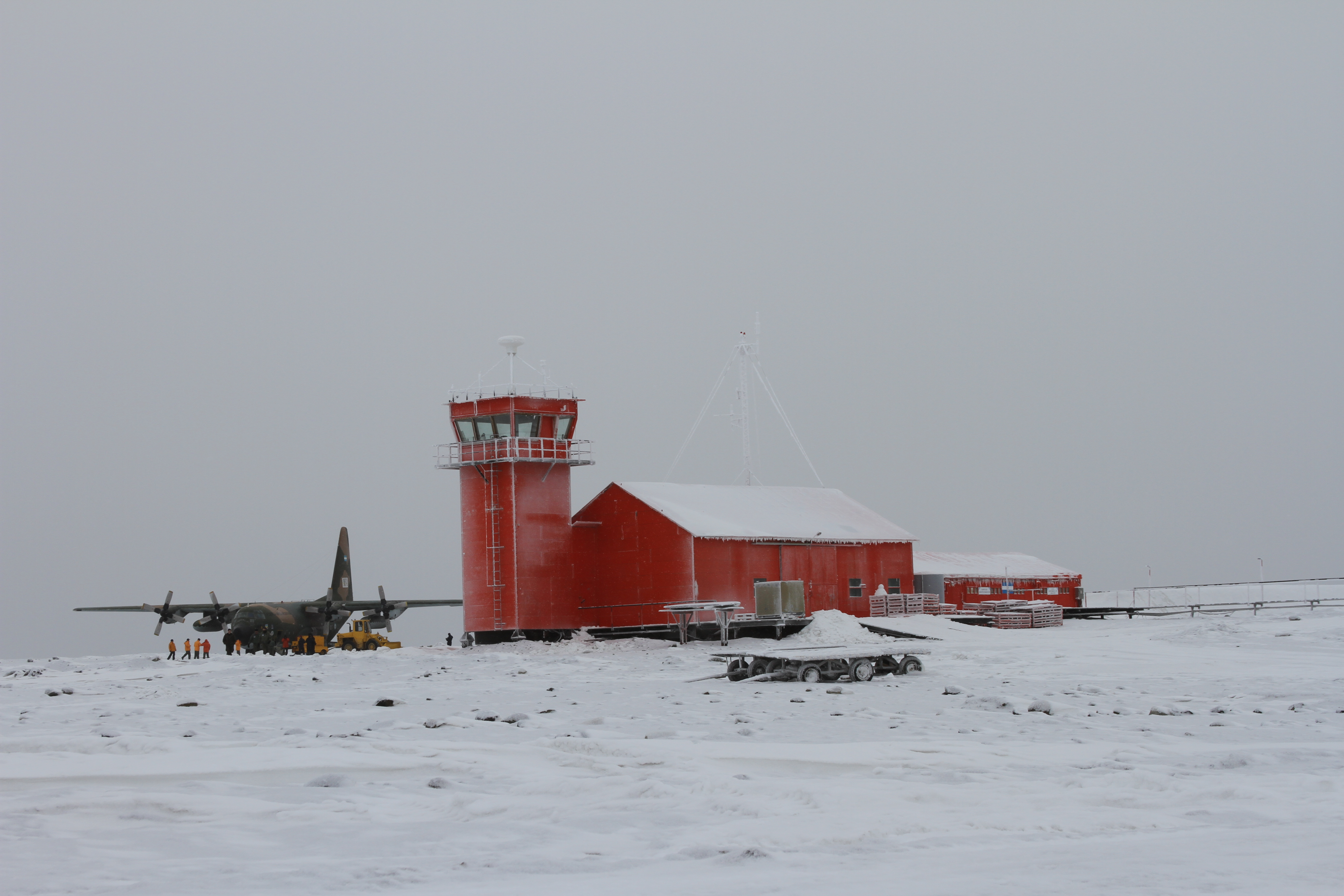
Argentine C-130 and control tower, Marambio Airport

- Argentine Antarctica
- Falkland Islands (1829–1831, 1832–1833, 1982)

=== Chilean ===
- Easter Island

== Colonies by African countries ==
=== South African ===
- South West Africa
- Prince Edward Islands

=== Moroccan ===
- Western Sahara

== Colonies by former countries ==
=== Ancient Egyptian ===
- Canaan (present-day Israel)

=== Ancient Roman ===
- Aegyptus
- Achaia
- Hispania
- Lusitania
- Illyricum
- Aquitania
- Gallia
- Galatia
- Raetia
- Moesia
- Judea
- Britannia

=== Chola (Tamil) ===
- Pandyas
- Sri Lanka
- Kalinga
- Eastern Gangas
- Palas
- Pegu
- Srivijaya

=== Couronian ===
- St. Andrews Island
- Couronian colonization of the Americas

== See also ==
- List of former European colonies
- List of Israeli settlements
- Concessions and leases in international relations
- Punitive expedition
- Chartered company
- List of trading companies
- European colonisation of Southeast Asia
- European colonization of the Americas
- Berlin Conference
- Concessions in China
- Tangier International Zone
- Peking Legation Quarter
- Colonisation of Africa
- Colonies in antiquity
- Treaty Ports of China, Korea and Japan
- Roman colonies
