= British concession of Amoy =

British Concession

British Concession at Amoy 廈門英租界
- British Concession
- 1852–1930
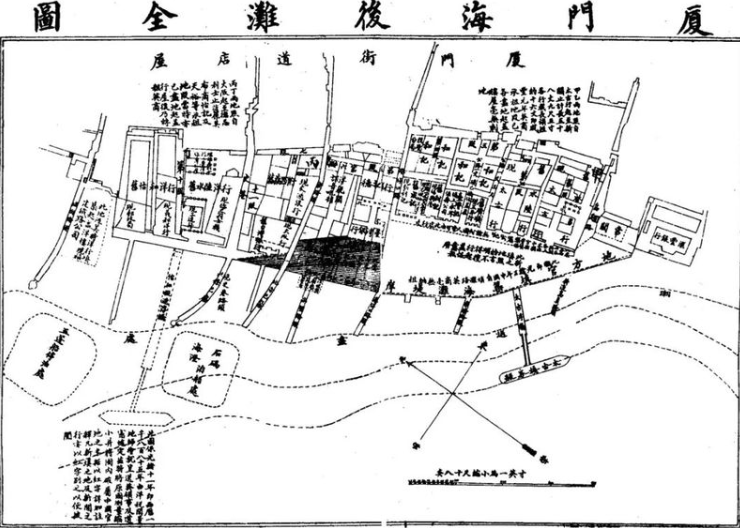

- Chinese map of the concession Location of the concession within China
- History
  - Established: 9 February 1852
  - Disestablished: 17 September 1930
- Today part of: China

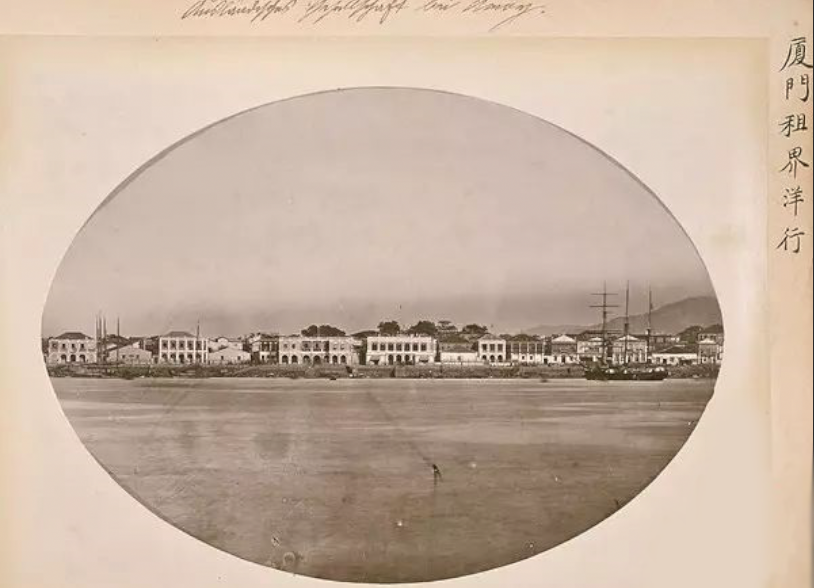
British Concession at Amoy

The British Concession at Amoy was a concession in Amoy, China (nowadays Xiamen) from 1852 to 1930. It was one of the two concessions in Amoy, with the other being the Kulangsu International Settlement. The concession is located in the west part of the present day of Siming, Xiamen.

After the First Opium War, Amoy was designated as one of the five "treaty ports" in accordance to the Treaty of Nanking in 1842, which the Kulangsu island of Amoy was occupied by the British Forces until 1845, when the Qing Government had fully paid its indemnity in accordance to the treaty.

The British after leaving the island have looked to acquire a concession in Amoy, which they were eventually granted a piece of foreshore by the Circuit Intendant Zhao Lin in February 1852. The concession was ended on 17 September 1930 and was re-accessed by the Chinese Nationalist Government.

== Area ==
The foreshore granted was located between the Daomei Wharf and Xin Wharf. It was defined as "an area with a length of fifty-five chang (approximately 189 metres) and a depth of twenty chang (approximately 69 metres) from the heads of Daomei Wharf and Xin Wharf (including Gangzaikou Wharf in between) towards the sea". The annual rental fee was one tael per square chang.

The concession was expanded in the 1860s when five parcels of foreshore along the Inner Harbour were leased to the British government and merchants, which being registered as "Lots No. 7 to 11" by the British Consulate at Amoy. Lots No. 7, 10, and 11 adjoining its Beach were then included in the British Concession, with tacit consent from the local Chinese government. The Lots No. 8 and 9 were however never considered as parts of the British Concession.

== See also ==
- Foreign concessions in China
- Kulangsu International Settlement
- Shanghai International Settlement
- British Concession of Jiujiang
