= American Concession =

American Concession may refer to:

- American Concession (Shanghai), an area of Shanghai which joined with British Concession to create the International Settlement in 1863
- The American concession in Tianjin, administered on a de facto basis between 1869–1880 under the aegis of the British concession
