= French concession of Hankou =

Former French concession in Hankou

French concession of Hankow Concession française de Hankou 漢口法租界
- Foreign concession of Second French Republic, Second French Empire, French Third Republic and French State
- 1896–1943
- Flag

- Location of the French concession of Hankou in green Other concessions in light green
- History
  - Established: 1896
  - Disestablished: 1943
Preceded by	Succeeded by
Qing Dynasty	Wang Jingwei regime

French Concession of Hankou
- Traditional Chinese: 漢口法租界
- Simplified Chinese: 汉口法租界
- Literal meaning: Hankow French Concession
Transcriptions
Standard Mandarin
- Hanyu Pinyin: Hànkǒu fǎ zūjiè

The French concession of Hankow (Chinese: 漢口法租界; Hànkǒu fǎ zūjiè; French: Concession française de Hankeou) was one of four French concessions in the late Qing Dynasty and the Republic of China (the others being in Shameen Island, Tientsin, and Shanghai), under administration from 1896 to 1943. It was one of five concession districts within Hankou, present-day Wuhan, Hubei. It was 0.24 km^{2} in size.

== History ==
=== Establishment ===
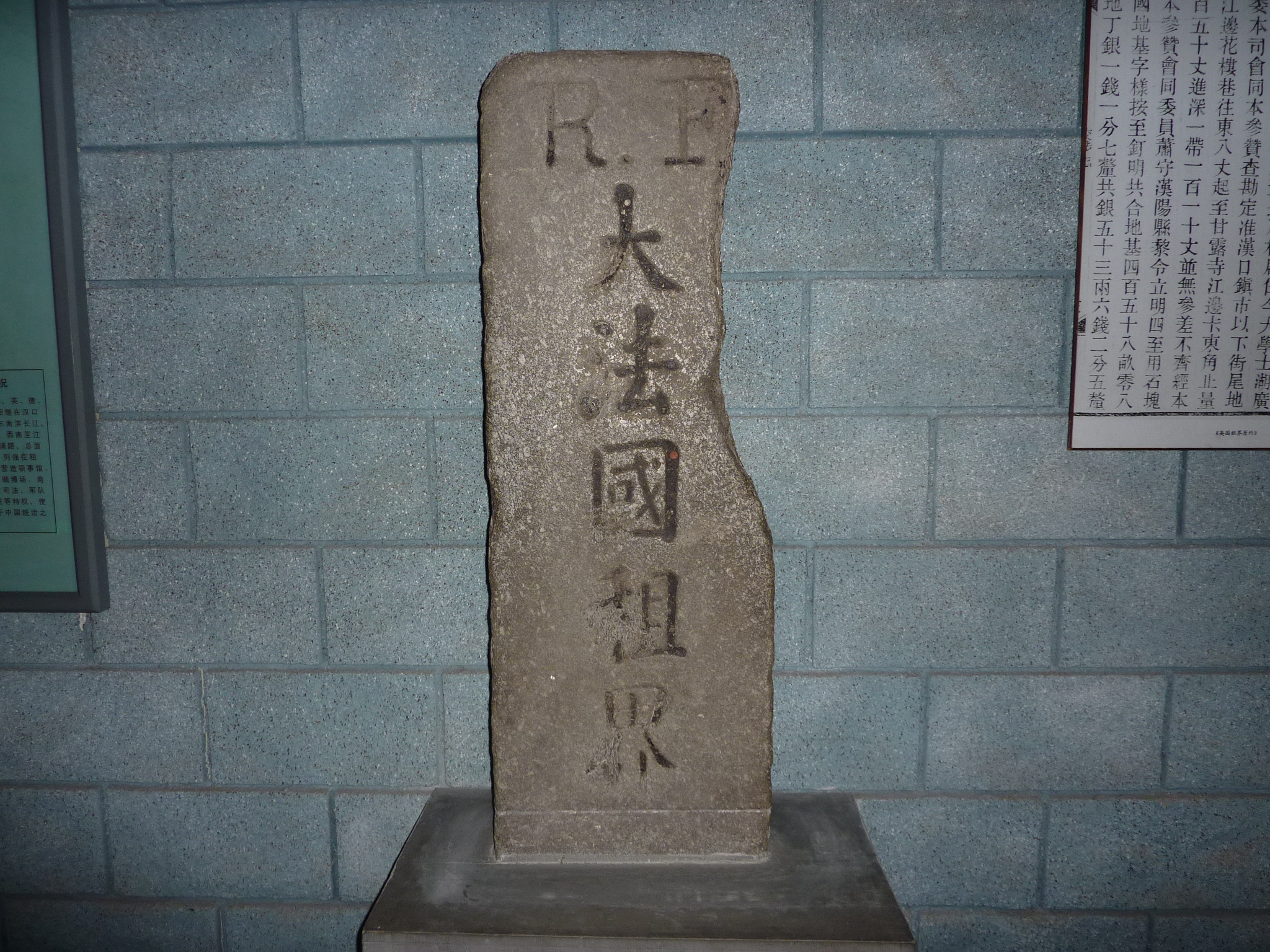
Delimitation marker of the French concession of Hankou, displayed in the Wuchang Uprising Memorial Museum in Wuhan. The initials "R.F." mean "République française" (French Republic).

In 1896, France signed the "Hankou French concession lease" with the Qing government, formally establishing a concession area of 187 acres that expanded once again in 1902. The Russian concession of Hankou was established in the same year; both were established in the same area, with the Russian concession accounting for 2/3rds of the area and the French accounting for 1/3rd.

=== Expansion ===
After the Chinese government took back the Japanese concession of Hankou on August 13, 1938, only the French concession remained. With the gradual deterioration of the situation in Wuhan due to Japanese fighting, many Chinese flowed into the concession, viewing it as a safe haven. The concession quickly became overcrowded; while Chinese residents numbered 22651 at the end of 1937, that number more than doubled to 47081 by 1938. It's likely it may have exceeded that number too; according to a 1940 survey, the number of Chinese residents greatly exceeded the recorded number of residents as almost all houses had additional Chinese living in basements and pavilions.

To prevent Chinese overpopulation in the concession and to prevent possible anti-Japanese activities that may lead to Japanese interference, the Board of Directors of the Ministry of Industry of the French Concession allocated ~22033 yuan to purchase barbed wire and the barbed Tribulus terrestris plant around the junctions of the Chinese block. Sandbags were also piled into a makeshift fortress at the end of each grid, with French and Annamese soldiers patrolling the borders, armed with machine guns and cannons. A grid with double rows of wooden pillars were also built for blockades. When it is heard the Japanese were coming to Wuhan, on the afternoon of October 25, the concession was officially closed. Later that day, the Japanese entered into Wuhan.

=== Isolation from France ===
Following the bloody Battle of Wuhan, the French concession became an isolated parcel of territory in the otherwise turbulent Japanese-occupied China, and even more thousands of refugees fled into the concession to flee war; during this period, it is said more than 100000 people were housed in the concession, both Chinese and foreigners alike. Thus, the price of daily necessities rose rapidly.

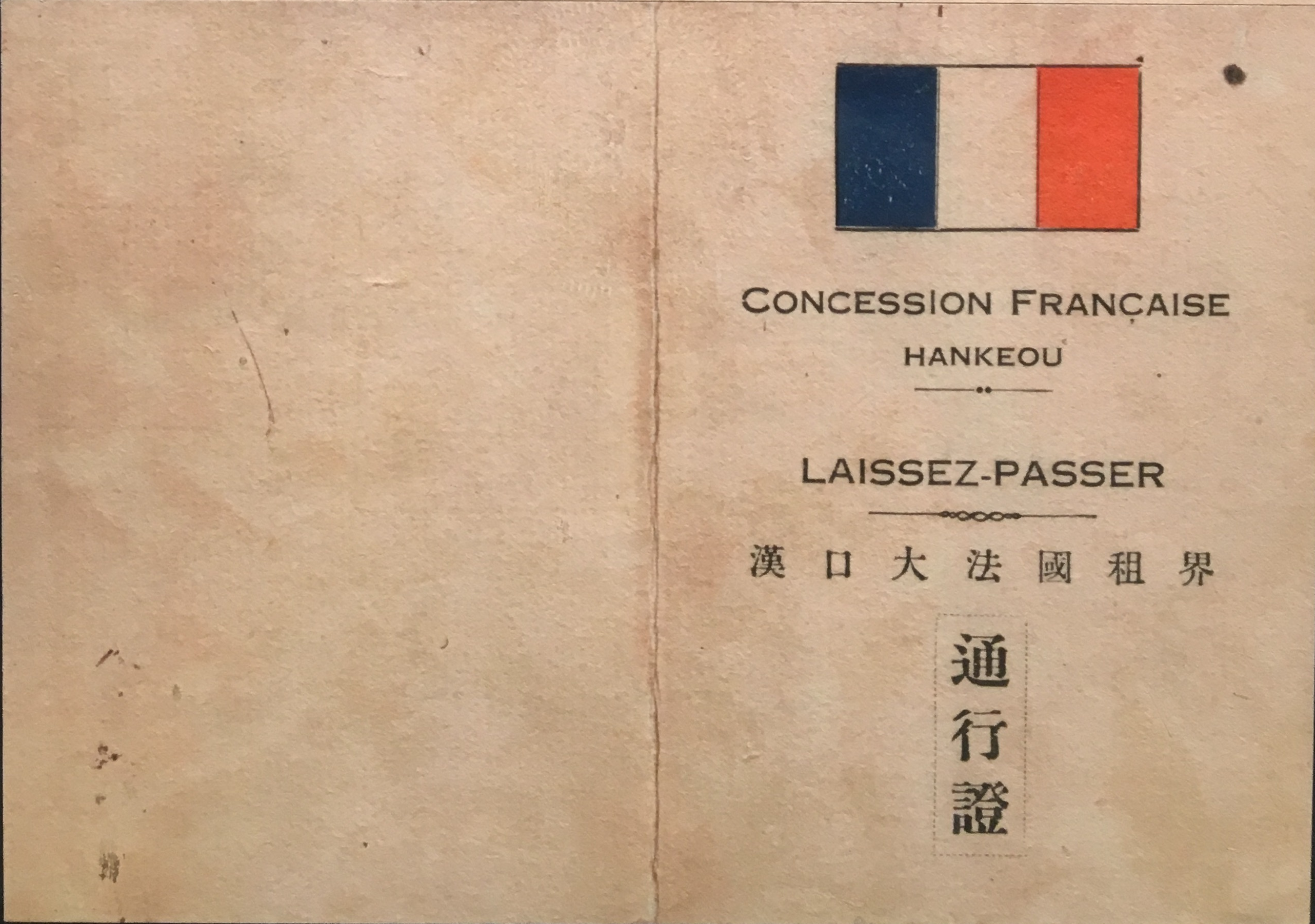
Pass used for entry and exit into the concession

Around midnight, October 25, water was cut off in the French concession, forcing residents to carry water early in the morning the next day. As the borders were closed, families had only a scarce amount of food to consist off of. Seeing the situation, the riverside gate of the concession was opened, allowed people with a designated pass to enter and exit, but those who entered were forbidden to carry food into the concession, leading to some vendors to strap foodstuffs to their chest and legs. If discovered by the Japanese sentries, the food would be confiscated and the lawbreaker punished. Only did a few days later did the local market reopen and vendors were able to carry food into the concession with a limit imposed.

On October 27, the Japanese army announced there was signs of anti-Japanese activity in the concession and imposed a strict lockdown onto the concession. It turns out there was indeed anti-Japanese sentiments in the concession, mainly orchestrated by the Kuomintang and other Chinese organizations, that published anti-Japanese propaganda and even infiltrated the police forces of the concession's Ministry of Industry. Before the fall of Wuhan, a branch of the Bureau of Investigation and Statistics was founded by Dai Li in the concession. According to the Japanese secret police, a Frenchman by the name of Q. L. Caffarena had a radio that communicated with the retreated Kuomintang and radical Chinese youths.

To further restrict these sentiments, Wuhan Public Security Maintenance Committee under Wang Jingwei's regime was established on November 27. With the consent of the French consul, the maintenance committee distributed 5,000 five-color flags and the Japanese flag to the Chinese in the field. However, on the same day, graffiti declaring "(simplified Chinese: 拥护蒋委员长抗战到底临死不投降; traditional Chinese: 擁護蔣委員長抗戰到底臨死不投降; lit. 'Support Chairman Chiang to the end and never surrender')" appeared on the Bank of Communications in the French concession, leading to the Japanese army arresting more than 20 suspects and seizing more radio stations.

Tensions between the French and Japanese heightened on January 12, 1939, when Annamese patrols and Japanese soldiers got into a spat near the Railway Hotel. leading to the death of one Japanese, arrest of five Japanese, and serious injuries for one Annamese. The spokesperson of the Japanese navy in Hankou briefed Western reporters that same day and demanded the French concession authorities to quickly and unconditionally release the arrested Japanese, or troops will block and close the gates leading from the concession to the outside. It was not until about a year after Paris was captured by the Germans in 1940 that the authorities of the concession succumbed to the occupying forces and adopted a more cooperative attitude.

=== Withdrawal ===
After Wuhan became an area occupied by the Japanese army, prices in the French Concession continued to rise with the rapid depreciation of currency in the Japanese-occupied area. Beginning in November 1938, the Japanese issued permits for "well-behaved" Chinese citizens with permission to enter and exit the concession as they liked. People continued to move into the concession, and after the fall of France to Nazi Germany, French businesses in China were quickly losing money, leaving the concession's Ministry of Industry to become destitute. In order to maintain daily expenses, the Ministry of Industry and Commerce has continuously increased the donation rate. Even still, the Industry cannot fit budget expenses, leaving to dismal fiscal deficits in 1941.

The financial situation became even more difficult after the Japanese bombing of Pearl Harbor and the initiation of the Pacific War. At the eve of the concession's absorption by the Wang Jingwei regime, the concession was on the verge of bankruptcy. On January 9, 1943, Shigemitsu Aoi, ambassador to the regime, signed the "Joint Declaration on the Cooperation to Complete the War between China and Japan" and the "Guide Agreement on the Return of the Concession and the Abolition of Extraterritoriality" with Wang Jingwei. On February 23, 1943, the French Vichy government announced that it agreed to abandon its concessions in China. On June 5, Wang Jingwei's regime took back the Tianjin French Concession, Hankou French Concession and Guangzhouwan on the same day.
