= Concessions and leases in international relations =

In international relations, a concession is a "synallagmatic act by which a State transfers the exercise of rights or functions proper to itself to a foreign private person which, in turn, participates in the performance of public functions and thus gains a privileged position vis-a-vis other private law subjects within the jurisdiction of the State concerned." International concessions are not defined in international law and do not generally fall under it. Rather, they are governed by the municipal law of the conceding state. There may, however, be a law of succession for such concessions, whereby the concession is continued even when the conceding state ceases to exist.

In international law, a lease is "an arrangement whereby territory is leased or pledged by the owner-State to another State. In such cases, sovereignty is, for the term of the lease, transferred to the lessee State." The term "international lease" is sometimes also used to describe any leasing of property by one state to another or to a foreign national, but the normal leasing of property, as in diplomatic premises, is governed by municipal, not international, law. Sometimes the term "quasi-international lease" is used for leases between states when less than full sovereignty over a territory is involved. A true international lease, or "political" lease, involves the transfer of sovereignty for a specified period of time. Although they may have the same character as cessions, the terminability of such leases is now fully accepted.

== American concessions ==
=== Current ===
- Guantanamo Bay Naval Base: leased from Cuba (which now disputes the lease) under 1903 and 1934 treaties in perpetuity; no civilian administration, only military command.
- Pituffik Space Base: a concession granted to the United States rent free by Denmark in perpetuity pursuant to the 1951 Greenland Defense Agreement which provides that the United States shall have exclusive jurisdiction over the area in question.
- Zangezur corridor (Trump Route for International Peace and Prosperity): a transport corridor in Armenia to be leased by the United States for 99 years, as stipulated under the 2025 Armenia–Azerbaijan peace agreement.
- The numerous cemeteries and monuments administered by the American Battle Monuments Commission. These are located in Belgium, Cuba, France, Gibraltar, Italy, Luxembourg, Mexico, Morocco, the Netherlands, Panama, Papua New Guinea, the Philippines, the Solomon Islands, South Korea, Tunisia, and the United Kingdom. The most popular sites among these are the Normandy American Cemetery and Memorial in France and the John F. Kennedy Memorial at Runnymede, United Kingdom.

=== Former ===
- Panama Canal Zone: territory in Panama obtained under the Hay–Bunau-Varilla Treaty in 1903. Returned to full Panaminian control in 1999 after the signing of the Torrijos–Carter Treaties in 1977.
- Corn Islands: leased from Nicaragua for 99 years under the Bryan–Chamorro Treaty. Returned in 1970 after the treaty was annulled.
- Two in imperial China:
  - 1848/54 American concession in Shanghai (since 17 November 1843 a Treaty Port) established, until on 21 September 1863 (after the 1862 Proposal to make Shanghai an independent "free city" was rejected) an International Settlement in Shanghai was created by union of the American and British concessions (consummated December 1863).
  - American concession of Tianjin (Tientsin).

== Austro-Hungarian concession holders ==
- The Austro-Hungarian concession of Tianjin (Tientsin), in China (1901–1917). Officially surrendered by Austria in 1919 (Treaty of Saint-Germain) and Hungary in 1920 respectively (Treaty of Trianon).

== Belgian concession holders ==
- The Guatemalan parliament issued a decree on 4 May 1843 by virtue of which the district of Santo Tomas was given "in perpetuity" to the Compagnie belge de colonisation, a private Belgian company under the protection of King Leopold I. Belgian colonizing efforts ceased after a few years, due to the lack of financial means and the harsh climate.
- The Lado enclave, in the Anglo-Egyptian Sudan, leased to the Congo Free State (not a part of Belgium itself, but in a personal union with Belgium under King Leopold II) (1894–1910)
- Belgian concession of Tianjin (Tientsin) (1902–1931)

== British concession holders ==
=== Held by the United Kingdom ===
- On 9 June 1898, the New Territories (comprising areas north of Kowloon along with 230 small islands) were leased from China for 99 years as a leased territory under the Convention for the Extension of Hong Kong Territory. On 19 December 1984, the UK agreed to restore all of Hong Kong—including the territories ceded in perpetuity—to China on 1 July 1997.
- On 20 November 1846, a British concession in Shanghai (in China) was established (after the 16 June 1842 – 29 August 1842 British occupation of Shanghai, since 17 November 1843 a Treaty Port); on 27 November 1848, this concession was expanded, but on 21 September 1863 (after the 1862 proposal to make Shanghai an independent "free city" was rejected) an International Settlement in Shanghai was created by union of the American and British concessions (consummated in December 1863).
- On 29 December 1877, representants of North Borneo Chartered Company met Abdul Momin, Sultan of Brunei. Before, in January 1876, Gustav Overbeck purchased from Joseph William Torrey for $15,000 the concessionary rights of American Trading Company of Borneo to territories in northern Borneo, conditional on the successful renewal of the concessions from local authorities. Overbeck was appointed Maharaja of Sabah and Rajah of Gaya and Sandakan in a 29 December 1877 treaty with Brunei Sultan Abdul Momin, who still claimed ownership of northern Borneo. The Sultan agreed to make the concession for 15,000 Spanish dollars. However, since it turned out that the Sultan of Brunei had already ceded some areas to the Sultan of Sulu, further negotiations were needed. With the assistance of William Clark Cowie, a Scottish adventurer and friend of Sultan Jamal-ul Azam of Sulu, the Sultan signed a concession treaty on 22 January 1878 and received 5,000 Spanish dollars.
- The British concession of Tianjin (Tientsin), in which the trade centred, was situated on the right bank of the river Peiho below the native city, occupying some 200 acres (0.81 km^{2}). It was held on a lease in perpetuity granted by the Chinese government to the British Crown, which sublet plots to private owners in the same way as at Hankou (Hankow). The local management was entrusted to a municipal council organized on lines similar to those at Shanghai.
- The British concession on the Shamian Island (Shameen Island) in Guangzhou (Canton).
- Namwan Assigned Tract leased from autonomous Mengmao Chiefdom under Qing China sovereignty to British India.

==== See also ====
- Treaty Ports (Ireland)

=== Privately held ===
- Tati Concessions Land 1872–1911, in a small part of present Botswana, detached from the Matabele kingdom.

== Canadian concessions ==
Following the First World War the French Republic granted Canada perpetual use of a portion of land on Vimy Ridge under the understanding that the Canadians were to use the land to establish a battlefield park and memorial. The park, known as the Canadian National Vimy Memorial, contains a monument to the fallen, a museum and extensive re-creations of the wartime trench system, preserved tunnels and cemeteries.

== Chinese concessions ==
Between 1882 and 1884, the Qing Empire obtained concessions in Korea at Incheon, Busan and Wonsan. The Chinese concession of Incheon and those in Busan and Wonsan were occupied by Japan in 1894 after the outbreak of the First Sino-Japanese War. After China's defeat in that war, Korea (now with Japanese support) declared the unequal treaties with Qing China to be void, and unilaterally withdrew the extraterritoriality and other powers granted to China in respect of the concessions. The concessions were formally abolished in 1898.

== Dutch concessions ==
In Japan, since 1609, the Dutch East India Company had run a trading post on the island of Hirado. Also, after a rebellion by mostly Catholic converts, all Portuguese were expelled from Dejima in 1639. So, in 1641, The Dutch were forced, by government officials of Tokugawa shogunate, to move from Hirado to Dejima in Nagasaki. The Dutch East India Company's trading post at Dejima was abolished when Japan concluded the Treaty of Kanagawa with the United States in 1858.

== French concessions ==
- The French concession in Shanghai was established on 6 April 1849 (it had been a Treaty Port since 17 November 1843). On 17 July 1854 a Municipal Council established. The concession was relinquished by Vichy France to the Japan-sponsored puppet government in China, and was formally returned to China by Provisional Government of the French Republic in 1946.
- French concession of Tianjin (1860–1946)
- French Leased Territory of Guangzhouwan (1898–1945)
- French concession of Hankou (Hankow; 1898–1946; now part of Wuhan)
- The French concession on the Shamian Island (Shameen Island) in Guangzhou (Canton) (1861–1946)

== Finnish concessions ==
- Saimaa Canal: leased from Russia under 1963 and 2010 treaties in period of 50 years; civilian and commercial administration

== German concessions ==
All in China:

- On 6 March 1898, Qingdao (Tsingtao) was leased "for 99 years" to Germany (Kiautschou Bay concession); it was already occupied by Germany since 14 November 1897. On 23 August 1914, Republic of China canceled the German lease. The concession was occupied by Japan on 7 November 1914.
- German concession of Tianjin (Tientsin)
- One of the concessions in Hankou (Hankow; now a part of Wuhan)

== Italian concessions ==
The Italian concession of Tianjin (Tientsin) was conceded to the Kingdom of Italy by Qing China on 7 September 1901. It was administered by Italy's Consul and had a population of 6,261 in 1935, including 536 foreigners. Several ships of the Italian Royal Navy (Regia Marina) were based at Tianjin. During World War II, the primary Italian vessels based at Tianjin were the minelayer Lepanto and the gunboat Carlotto. On 10 September 1943, the Italian concession at Tianjin was occupied by Japan. In 1943, Italian Fascist dictator Benito Mussolini's (however virtually powerless) Italian Social Republic relinquished the concession to the Japanese-sponsored 'Chinese National Government', a Japanese puppet state led by Wang Jingwei; it was never recognized by the Kingdom of Italy, the Republic of China, or most world governments. On 10 February 1947, by peace treaty, the zone was formally returned to Nationalist China by the Italian Republic.

== Japanese concessions ==
In China:

- the Japanese concession of Tianjin (Tientsin).
- the only non-Western concession in Hankou (Hankow; today a part of Wuhan).

In Korea (Chosen), before the annexation of Korea by Japan (1910):

- Busan
- Incheon

== Portuguese concession ==
- Macau: around 1552–1553, the Portuguese obtained permission to establish a settlement as a reward for defeating pirates and to mediate in trade between China and Japan and between both nations and Europe; it was leased from the empire of China from 1670. The concession turned into a Portuguese colony in the mid-19th century. The Chinese government assumed sovereignty over Macau on 20 December 1999, ending 329 years of Portuguese colonial rule.
- Portuguese India: In 1498, Vasco da Gama managed to secure a letter of concession for trading rights from the Zamorin, Calicut's ruler on the Malabar Coast. In 1500, on Cochin and Cannanore, Pedro Álvares Cabral succeeded in making advantageous treaties of the City-state with the local rulers. In 1502, the Portuguese built a trade post in Pulicat because its location at the mouth of a lagoon made it a great natural harbor. Then, Timoji (vassal of Vijayanagara Empire and ally of Portuguese empire) prompted the Portuguese to conquer Goa (controlled by Muslims), the main port for the horse trade, so Portugal invested in the capture of Goa to the Sultanate of Bijapur with the support of Timoji and recognized by the Raja of Cochin, Cannanore and emperor Krishnadevaraya.
- Nagasaki and Dejima: In 1580, Ōmura Sumitada cedes jurisdiction over Nagasaki and Mogi to the Portuguese Jesuits, but in 1588 Toyotomi Hideyoshi exerts direct control over Nagasaki, Mogi, and Urakami from the Jesuits (after Hideyoshi banished Christian missionaries from Kyūshū, to exert greater control over the Kirishitan daimyō). Then, the Portuguese are interned on Dejima (Fourth National Isolation Edict) in 1636, but after Shimabara Rebellion, Portuguese ships are prohibited from entering Japan. Consequently, the Portuguese concessions are banished from Dejima and Japan.

== Russian and Soviet concessions ==
- Kwantung Leased Territory with cities Dalniy and Port Arthur.
- Chinese Eastern Railway with city Harbin.
- The Russian concession of Tianjin (Tientsin).
- one of the concessions of Hankou (Hankow; now part of Wuhan).
- Hanko Peninsula, a peninsula near the Finnish capital Helsinki, was leased for a period of 30 years by the Soviet Union from its northwestern neighbour—and former possession in personal union—Finland for use as a naval base in the Baltic Sea, near the entry of the Gulf of Finland, under the Moscow Peace Treaty that ended the Winter War on 6 March 1940; during the Continuation War, Soviet troops were forced to evacuate Hanko in early December 1941, and the USSR formally renounced the lease—early given the original term until 1970—in the Paris peace treaty of 1947. The role of the Hanko naval base was replaced by Porkkalanniemi another Finnish peninsula, a bit farther east at the Gulf of Finland, in the armistice between Finland and the Soviet Union of 19 September 1944; the Porkkala naval base was returned to Finland in January 1956. In both cases, the Soviets limited themselves to a military command, without any civilian administration.
- Khmeimim Air Base in Syria is leased to the Russian government for a period of 49 years, with the Russian government having extraterritorial jurisdiction over the air base and its personnel.
- Since 2015 after the Donbas and Crimea invasion Russia agreed to lease 300,000 hectares to China for 50 years for $449 million US dollars. The lease can be extended in 2018 if the first stage from 2015 to 2018 was successful. Russia needed the Chinese funds to replace a shortfall caused by international sanctions. The Transbaikal region borders with China, and the lease agreement stirred up a maelstrom of controversy and anxiety in Russia. China will send a massive influx of Chinese workers to settle and work in the area.

== Spanish concessions ==
- On 22 July 1878, Spanish forces operating from the Philippines forced the Sultan of Sulu to surrender in the Spanish–Moro conflict, the Sultan of Sulu relinquished the sovereign rights over all his possessions in favour of Spain Suzerainty, based on the "Bases of Peace and Capitulation" signed by the Sultan of Sulu and the crown of Spain in Jolo on 22 July 1878, and permitted them to set up a small garrison on Siasi Island and in the town of Jolo. These areas were only partially controlled by the Spanish, and their power was limited to only military stations and garrisons and pockets of civilian settlements. Causing Overbeck to lose his title and territory in the north-eastern areas just gained from the Sultan to the British Borneo. In 1885, Great Britain, Germany and Spain signed the Madrid Protocol to cement Spanish influence over the islands of the Philippines. In the same agreement, Spain relinquished all claim to North Borneo, which had belonged to the sultanate in the past, to the British government. Dividing Borneo in a Spanish and a British concession of the Sultanate of Sulu.
- Sultanate of Tidore established an alliance with the Spanish East Indies in the sixteenth century, and Spain had several forts on the island by concession, also conquering someones to Sultanate of Ternate (allied with Portuguese and then with Dutch East India Company).
- All of Portuguese concessions in Africa and Asia were also Spanish concessions during Iberian Union.

== Jointly held concessions ==
- 21 September 1863 (after the 1862 Proposal to make Shanghai an independent "free city" was rejected) an International Settlement in Shanghai was created by union of the American and British concessions (consummated December 1863); in 1896 the concession was expanded. On 7 July 1927, a Chinese city government of Greater Shanghai was formally established. Its internationality can be seen in the flag of the Ministry of Industry and Trade-Shanghai: Flags of the Austria-Hungary, Denmark, Third Republic of France, Kingdom of Italy, Netherlands, German Empire, United Kingdom of Sweden-Norway, Kingdom of Portugal, Russian Empire, Kingdom of Spain, United Kingdom and United States of America. Belgium, Peru, Mexico, Japan and Switzerland were also part of the international concession. The ROC government refused to grant treaty rights to new countries after World War I, such as Germany, Austria and Hungary (formerly the Austro-Hungarian and German Empire, whose privileges were abolished after 1918), Poland, Czechoslovakia, Yugoslavia, the Baltic States, and Finland. Russia waived its rights for Soviet political expediency. China declared that Belgium had lost its rights in 1927. In January/February 1931, the Japanese occupied the Hongkou District (Hongkew), and on 9 November 1937 the Chinese city of Shanghai, but only on 8 December 1941 would Japanese troops occupy the International Settlement (but not the French concession); it was dissolved by Japan in 1942. In February 1943 the settlement is officially abolished by the U.S. and Britain; in September 1945, the last territory is restored to China.
- On January 10, 1902, the consuls of Great Britain, the United States, Germany, France, Italy, Spain, Denmark, the Netherlands, Sweden-Norway, Japan and other eight countries signed the "Gulangyu delimitation charter" in the Gulangyu Japanese Consulate. Subsequently, in January 1903, the Gulangyu International Settlement Municipal Council was established.
- Beijing Legation Quarter: a de facto concession.
- Tangier International Zone: Under the Paris Convention, Tangier was made a neutral zone under joint administration by the participating countries (Spain, France and UK). The Paris Convention was proposed for ratification to the other powers that were party to the Algeciras Conference - except Germany, Austria and Hungary, disempowered by the peace treaties (respectively of Versailles, Saint-Germain and Trianon), and the Soviet Union, then estranged from the international system. Italy's demand to join the international framework on a par with the signatories of the Paris Convention was supported by Spain from 1926, then by the UK, and a new conference eventually started in Paris in March 1928. Then, Portugal, Belgium, the Netherlands, and Italy joined the city government. Then, after World War II and the Spanish occupation of Tangier, a quadripartite conference (France, Soviet Union, UK and United States) met in Paris in August 1945, concluding a temporary Anglo-French Agreement of 31 August 1945, in which the two powers made arrangements for the re-establishment of the Zone's international institutional framework, inviting the United States and the Soviet Union to join it, passing both of them to be present in the city government.
- Dobruja: The Central Powers occupied all of Dobruja and, according to Treaty of Bucharest, the territory from south of Cernavodă-Constanța railroad up to the Danube and the Sfântu Gheorghe branch in a joint condominium recognized by Romania and Bulgarian states (then Bulgarian annexed it).

== United Nations concessions ==
- UN Headquarters: United Nations headquarters in New York City. Under United States laws in exchange for local police, fire protection, and other services.
- Palace of Nations: United Nations palace/office in Geneva.
- Vienna International Centre: United Nations complex/office in Vienna.
- UN Office in Nairobi: United Nations office in Nairobi. Headquarters of UNEP and UN-Habitat.
- UN offices in Bonn: 19+ United Nations offices in Bonn.
- International Court of Justice: UN-owned court in The Hague.
- International Tribunal for the Law of the Sea: UN-owned tribunal in Hamburg.
- Other UN offices

== Foreign concessions in China ==
- Concessions in Tianjin
- Chinese Eastern Railway Zone
- Guangzhouwan
- Kiautschou Bay
- Weihaiwei under British rule
- Russian Dalian
- Kwantung Leased Territory
- Shanghai French Concession
- Shanghai International Settlement
  - British Concession (Shanghai)
  - American Concession (Shanghai)

== See also ==
- 99-year lease
- Eminent domain
- Chartered companies
- Colonization
- Timeline of national independence
