= Russian concession of Hankou =

Russian territory in China (1896–1925)

Russian concession of Hankou Российская концессия в Ханькоу
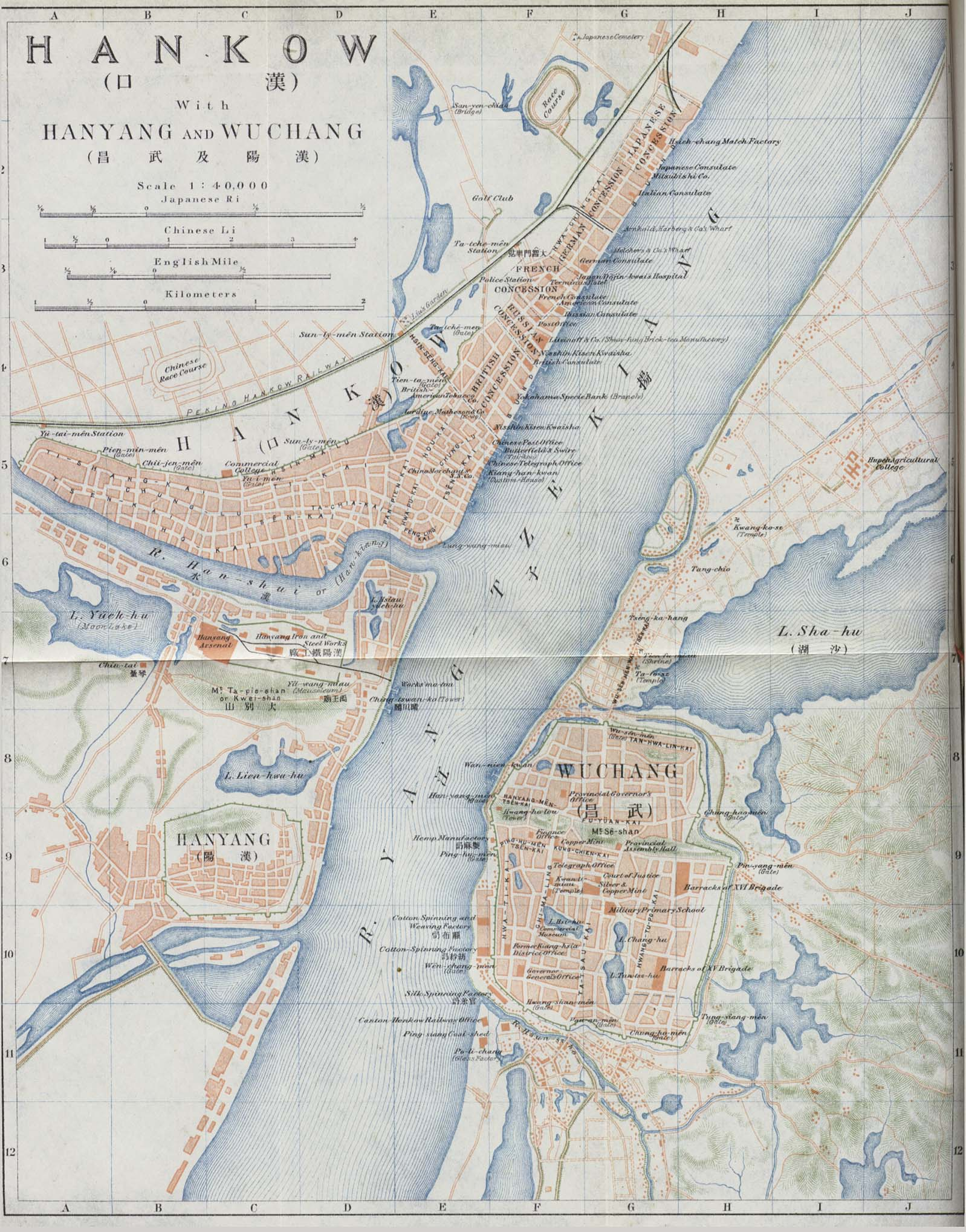
- Map of Hankou, 1915 (concessions along the riverbank, northern section of the map) Location of the Russian concession of Hankou in green Other concessions in light green
- History
  - Established: 1896
  - Relinquished by the Soviet Union: 1925
Preceded by	Succeeded by
Qing Empire	Beiyang government
- Today part of: China

The Russian concession of Hankou (Note: previously romanized as Hankow or Hangkow.) (Russian: Российская концессия в Ханькоу) was an extraterritorial exclave, a concession, of the Russian Empire in the former Chinese city of Hankou, now a district of Wuhan. It was established in 1896 by the Tsarist government and lasted until 1925, when the Soviet Union relinquished control over the territory.

It was one of five that existed in the city, alongside the British, French, German and Japanese ones.

== History ==
=== Formation ===
==== Economic interests ====
The defeat of the Russian Empire in the Crimean War at the hands of a Franco-British coalition made evident the disparities between itself and other European powers, triggering a refocusing towards "the East" by the Tsarist government. During the following decade of the 1860s, vast territories of the Amur River basin were acquired, where Vladivostok would be founded, from the Qing Empire.

The first Russian presence in Hankou, however, was purely economical. The growing imbalance between dwindling fur and woollen textiles exports at the frontier town of Kyakhta and the booming interest in the Qing's main export, tea, attracted merchants and dealers aiming to cut production costs by operating closer to the source. They mostly settled in the British concession, with more dispersed among the French, and, to a lesser extent, the Chinese quarters.

They exported their goods down the Yangtze towards Shanghai and further, to a series of destinations, such as Tianjin, Kyakhta or directly to European Russia. The rate of chests of tea sent to Russian from Hankou was 8,554 in 1867, 9,120 in 1868 and 26,446 in 1869.

In 1863, the first tea brick factory was built, followed by two more later on, substituting the traditional hand-presses with steam engines, assembly lines, and mechanised machinery; together they employed around 900 people. Further development followed, with the construction of the first industrial wharf and warehouse dock on the river front in 1871.

Initially, the atmosphere between the foreign powers sharing Hankou was akin to that of "one close European family", however this level of solidarity was not to last. In September 1895, Count Artur Pavlovich Kassini, Russian minister in Beijing, received a petition from Russian traders on the matter of creating an concession. Some sources attribute the incipient idea to the Russian consul in the city, Alexander Stepanovich Vakhovich.

Such development is plausible, as Vakhovich was a diplomat more concerned with the commercial aspects, unlike those with aristocratic backgrounds, who remarked, that while other nations raced to "line their pockets at China's expenses, [the Russians] sat by quietly and nobly as before". Additionally, the petition detailed the advantages of developing direct shipping between Hankou and Russia; Vakhovich's brother worked for the firm "Shevelev & Co.", which had previously attempted, unsuccessfully, to organise steamer services from Vladivostok and Nikolaevsk to Hankou.

Regardless, as activity grew, and the Russians living in the city became more economically influential, then-Tsesarevich Nikolai Romanov, future Tsar of Russia, organised an official visit to the city in April 1891. The subject of the visit remains one of debate; the Chinese government claimed that he had toured the Hanyang Steel factory, which the local administration had invested in. As the visit aligned with the so-called "Self-Strengthening period", this claim was used to demonstrate Chinese achievements in the wake of increasing involvement by foreign powers. However, it has also been claimed that he only visited the Russian factories, making the visit purpose more aligned with imperialist interests than strictly diplomatic ones.

Further debate exists around the importance of economic activity as a deciding factor for Russian interest in Hankou, as is argued by Candidate of Sciences Viktoria Gennadievna Sharonova, who believes that the Russian Empire aimed to concentrate its defused diaspora in the city. Karin-Irene Eiermann, on the other hand, minimises the economic aspects, and focuses on the political nature of the investment:

In actuality, there was little economic motivation behind the establishment of the Russian concession in Wuhan; the government developed it halfheartedly at best, with large parts of the concession area unused. The reason underlying the concession can only be understood as a desire to demonstrate to other imperial powers that Russia, as well, was a powerful nation, deserving of equal claims.

— Karin-Irene Eiermann,

==== Political motivations ====
After its victory in the Sino-Japanese War, Japan issued a set of demands to its defeated Chinese enemy, one in particular catching the eye of Sergei Witte. As an influential statesman, he had pursued his vision of modernisation centred around the Trans-Siberian Railway, which he wanted to pass through the shortest route to Vladivostok, Manchuria. Japan's interest in the region, particularly demands regarding the Liaodong Peninsula, threatened to interfere with his plans. Thus, Russia allied with other European powers to force Japan to abandon its claims on Liaodong, along with a series of other territorial, economic, and political demands from China, as a "price" for the intervention.

Soon enough, Hankou also caught Witte's interest. Dmitry Dmitrievich Pokotilov had produced a report for the Ministry of Finance on the importance of the Trans-Siberian on trade with treaty ports, where he had stated that the city was of "paramount importance" for Russian commerce in the region; he was later appointed head of the Russo-Chinese Bank by Witte. He had identified three main problems: geography, transportation (or rather, lack thereof), and culture. Geographical limitations coupled with an underdeveloped transportation network made the distance between the Russian heartland to the Far East and the concessions extremely difficult, costly, and tedious to traverse. Additionally, he had expressed the view that the average Russian merchant was "by nature little mobile […] accustomed to travelling overland", to do business in China he needed to "enter what is for him a completely new set of situations". The construction of the Trans-Siberian would, he concluded, "radically change" the circumstances.

This coincidentally aligned itself with Witte's vision, based on Friedrich List' economic theory, wherein Russian commerce is inadvertently depended on state support:

History presents examples of the downfall of many nations because they were unable to carry out at a favourable time the great task of safeguarding their moral, economic, and political independence by the establishment of manufacturing and the creation of a strong class of manufacturers and merchants.

— Friedrich List, as quoted by Sidney Harcave,

Consequently, Witte wrote and presented a memorandum to Tsar Nicholas II, stressing the importance of Hankou as a potential treaty port, as well as the "pre-eminent" position of Russian tea merchants, who, however, had to operate within foreign concessions. The problem was, thus, framed as one of cost, as it was estimated that around 5,000 roubles were paid annually to the British in the form of taxes, levies, rents, etc. Tea commerce, however, was disproportionally conducted by Russian, rather than British merchants, as by 1895, British producers had left Hankou almost entirely, spurred on by shifting preferences for Indian and Sri Lankan sorts, partly influenced by deliberate efforts of the British, "stoking fears about adulteration and poor hygiene" of Chinese products.

The memorandum proved convincing, and the Tsar communicated his approval for the establishment of a Russian concession in Hankou on November 22.

To the Russians in Hankou, it was a locally defined project to help develop cheaper shipping routes for the tea traders. In the aftermath of the Sino-Japanese War, for the Ministry of Foreign Affairs the concession became an object of zero-sum imperial competition for commercially significant territory. Finally, the concession was slotted into place as one small cog in Witte’s Listian vision of a ‘national economy’ of continental scale, and, perhaps to pique the emperor’s attention, embellished with an appeal to affronted imperial prestige.

— Karin-Irene Eiermann,

=== Establishment ===
With the plan put in motion in late 1895, negotiations and delimitations began, but issues regarding landowners within the selected territory arose from the very beginning. In a manner similar to that of the British in 1861, the Russians faced the problem of a "wealthy Chinese" who owned a significant portion of the land. Considering that Russian and Chinese authorities reserved the right to a negotiated price exclusively to foreign owners and unwilling to pay solely for his land, the affluent landowner began construction of a large building, with the hopes of receiving a proportionally larger compensation. The British had resolved their similar problem with armed sailors, the Russians, on the other hand, had to refrain from employing force, as the concession was supposed to be a sign of "gratitude" for the triple intervention against Japan. 18 months were needed to evict the landowner, with additional payments for his "unfinished warehouse".

Afterwards, around late December of the same year, the French authorities stated that they possessed a claim to certain plots of the concession's land. Unwilling to damage its relationship with an important ally, the Russian government agreed to settle any existing disputes around a negotiation table. Additional disagreements also occurred with British companies, which leased land inside the concession, oftentimes resisting offers of acquisition, both during the concession's inception and throughout its existence.

=== Under the Russian Empire ===
The Russian concession in Hankou came into existence on April 14, 1896; a "construction committee" was first implemented, with the cooperation of local Russian industrialists, to aid in its development. The administration was later handed over to a "popular council" —composed of both individuals and companies, Russian and foreign— that oversaw the governance of all of its inhabitants, regardless of nationality. Furthermore, the Russian Consulate organised the creation of a Temporary Economic Committee, formed out of four members among the landowners in the concession. Both organisations were in charge of the operation of the concession, construction, and other ventures—all subsidised by the Russian government.

All in all, among the completed projects were: a promenade (dubbed Nicholas' Promenade), the new building of the Russian Consulate (relocated from Hanyang), an industrial bureau, all the corresponding infrastructure for a set of police and firefighter units, two schools (a Russian and a Russo-Chinese one) —which specialised in commerce and economic science— an Orthodox church as well as a number of luxurious residences. Even so, the development remained relatively minor in comparison to that of other European powers. The Russian population didn't venture into other markets apart from the aforementioned brick tea, while pursuits of education or missionary work were, if anything, limited.

Parallel to the progress of the Russian concession in Hankou, the Russian Empire continued its expansion in Asia in the form of a 25-year lease of the southern tip of the Liadong Peninsula (including Dailan and Port Arthur), building rights of a railway through Manchuria, and another concession in Tianjin. While providing the Tsarist government with strategically beneficial territories, this expansion also collapsed whatever goodwill was left with the Qing government regarding the concession in Hankou and Russian influence as a whole, much to the displeasure of Witte.

However, the statesman himself would soon fall out of favour with the Tsar, and with him, vanished the dual vision of the concession, one cultivated around ideals of a "national economy", as he and Pokotilov, Witte's right-hand man, defined it and another, a narrower one, born out of the on-site economic realities. Likewise, after 1905, and the expulsion of the Russian Empire from southern Manchurian in its humiliating defeat in the Russo-Japanese War, contact between Russian territories in China and the Trans-Siberian Railway was cut, putting a definite end to any of Witte's plans for railways to "form the iron skeleton of this new Russia".

Economically and socially, the environment from which the concession was born, and within which it later operated, differed significantly as well. Any concepts of cosmopolitanism, utopian free-trade theory, and the single "European family" upon which the concession was founded during the mid-19th century, got rapidly replaced by a climate more characterised by competition, nationalism, and rivalry by the century's end; the incipient idea "was increasingly revealed to have been a product of temporary circumstances". While the International Settlement in Shanghai preserved a unique example of coexistence, it was the exception, rather than the norm, as concessions became "miniatures […] of the countries they represent[ed]".

=== Under Soviet Russia ===
In 1917, the Russian Empire ceased to exist and after the October Revolution was plunged into a bloody Civil War between the Bolsheviks and the White movement. Initially, the Beijing government refused to recognise Soviet Russia; the latter, however, viewed the former as a potential ally against its enemies, the United Kingdom and other Great Powers, as well as an opportunity to end its diplomatic isolation. In July 1919, the Soviet government published the First Karakhan (Note: Named after Lev Karakhan, first Soviet ambassador to China.) declaration (or manifesto), aimed at ensuring an end of all unequal treaties previously in effect with the former Tsarist government. The Chinese government, thereafter, decreed an end to all extraterritorial rights for White Russians within the country. The Second Karakhan declaration followed on September 27, 1920, reiterating the previous declaration's statements.

But both diplomatic gestures weren't met with a reciprocal recognition from Beijing, in fact, the Chinese government ordered the Russian concessions to be put under its administration. In Hankou, local Chinese troops attempted to take over the Russian exclave, which was defended by British, French, and American police units. Consequently, on October 8, 1920, the French consul declared the Russian concession to be part of the French, defending it thrice more against continued take over attempts, fearing a Chinese victory would foment anti-foreign sentiments among the local population.

In August 1922, ambassador Adolph Joffe travelled to meet with Sun Yat-sen's Kuomintang government in the south of China, where bilateral negotiations were held. This move worried the Beijing government in the north, as it aspired to be perceived as the sole representative of China, and maintained a fierce rivalry with the southern state. Thusly, capitalising on the opportunity, in September 1923, the Soviet delegation travelled to Beijing, formalising the Sino-Soviet Treaty in 1924, resuming diplomatic relations. One of the clauses dictated the end of all Russian extraterritorial concessions. The transfer of the Hankou concession was arranged on July 1, 1924, but it wasn't until March 2, 1925, that it was effectuated. Most of its property, however, was taken by the Soviet government.

It is still debated whether the policy pursued by the Soviet government represented a betrayal of Marxist–Leninist anti-imperialist principles, and exploitation of imperial vestiges for its profit or, instead, a demonstration of Soviet internationalist ideology. Bruce Elleman is a proponent of the former explanation, arguing that extraterritoriality was retained, particularly with the Soviet nationalisation of trade in 1923, which made anyone engaged in foreign trade be considered a Soviet official. Thusly, virtually all Soviet citizens in China gained a status of diplomatic immunity a year before official relations had been re-established.

Alexander Lukin, conversely, has proposed an alternative explanation, designating Soviet actions in regard to Tsarists concessions as manifestations not of continued imperialism, but of communist internationalism:

Only lack of understanding of the broader ideological basis of Soviet foreign policy in this period could lead to the view that Communist Russia merely used revolutionary rhetoric to conceal its continuation of the traditional imperialist and expansionist policies of the Russian Empire. The primary goal of both the Soviet state and the Comintern in China was to promote national revolution as a part of the world revolution. […] Nikolai Bukarin, put in 1923 speaking at a meeting of the ECCI: ‘The primary goal in China on which we all should orient ourselves is the national revolution. All other foreign policy questions are linked to it.’

— Alexander Lukin,
