= Foreign territories in China =

The concessions were enclaves located in Chinese cities that were leased to, governed, and occupied foreign powers. In these concessions, foreigners were given the right to freely inhabit, trade, travel, and perform missionary evangelization. Some of these territories were directly leased by foreign powers, effectively removing them from the control of local governments and serving as de facto colonies. A 1937 inventory of all the concessions along with a survey of their status done by W. C. Johnstone shows that, aside from the two international settlements at Shanghai and Xiamen, there were a total of 23 foreign concessions to 8 nations in 10 Chinese cities. In addition to the 23 formally established concessions, Britain, Japan, and the United States were granted rights to concessions in several additional treaty ports, but these rights were never exercised.

In addition, territories were fully administered as colonies and had their sovereignty transferred to a foreign power in perpetuity. These include Portuguese Macau, and the areas of Hong Kong Island and Kowloon in British Hong Kong.

== List ==
Country	City	Type	Year established	Year disestablished	Ref
International	Beijing	Leased territory	1861	1945	
International	Shanghai	Concession	1863	1943 (Note: Occupied by Japan during World War II in 1941.)	
International	Xiamen	Concession	1903	1945	
Austria-Hungary	Tianjin	Concession	1902	1917	
Belgium	Tianjin	Concession	1902	1931	
France	Shanghai	Concession	1849	1946	
France	Liwan (Note: Merged into Guangzhou in 1921.)	Concession	1859	1946	
France	Tianjin	Concession	1861	1946	
France	Hankou (Note: Merged into Wuhan in 1926.)	Concession	1896	1946	
France	Kunming	Railway	1904	1940	
France	Zhanjiang	Leased territory	1911	1946	
Germany	Hankou	Concession	1895	1917	
Germany	Tianjin	Concession	1895	1917	
Germany	Qingdao	Leased territory	1897	1922 (Note: Occupied by Japan during World War I in 1914.)	
Italy	Tianjin	Concession	1901	1947	
Japan	Chongqing	Concession	1897	1937	
Japan	Suzhou	Concession	1897	1943	
Japan	Hangzhou	Concession	1897	1943	
Japan	Shashi (Note: Merged into Jingzhou in 1994.)	Concession	1898	1943	
Japan	Hankou	Concession	1898	1945	
Japan	Tianjin	Concession	1898	1945	
Japan	Xiamen	Concession	1898	1945	
Japan	Dalian	Railway	1905	1937	
Japan	Dalian	Leased territory	1905	1945	
Japan	Lüshunkou (Note: Merged into Dalian in 1950.)	Leased territory	1905	1945	
Portugal	Macau	Colony	1849 (Note: Portugal had established a permanent presence in Macau since 1557 but only began administering the territory as a colony after the Passaleão incident in 1849.)	1999	
Russia; Soviet Union	Hankou	Concession	1896	1924	
Russia; Soviet Union	Harbin	Railway	1896	1920	
Russia; Soviet Union	Dalian	Leased territory	1898	1905	
Russia; Soviet Union	Lüshunkou	Leased territory	1898	1905	
Russia; Soviet Union	Tianjin	Concession	1900	1924	
Russia; Soviet Union	Harbin	Railway	1929	1934	
Russia; Soviet Union	Harbin	Railway	1945	1952	
Russia; Soviet Union	Lüshunkou	Leased territory	1945	1955	
United Kingdom	Hong Kong	Colony (Note: Area of British Hong Kong.)	1842	1997	
United Kingdom	Hong Kong	Colony	1860	1997	
United Kingdom	Hong Kong	Leased territory	1898	1997	
United Kingdom	Shanghai	Concession	1846	1863	
United Kingdom	Xiamen	Concession	1852	1930	
United Kingdom	Liwan	Concession	1859	1945	
United Kingdom	Tianjin	Concession	1860	1945	
United Kingdom	Hankou	Concession	1861	1927	
United Kingdom	Jiujiang	Concession	1861	1929	
United Kingdom	Zhenjiang	Concession	1861	1929	
United Kingdom	Weihai	Leased territory	1898	1930	
United States	Shanghai	Concession	1848	1863	
United States	Tianjin	Concession	1860	1902	

== Proposed ==
Additionally, there were more concessions planned but never completed.

Country	City	Type	Ref
United Kingdom	Yingkou	Concession	
United Kingdom	Nanjing	Concession	
United Kingdom	Yichang	Concession	
United Kingdom	Wuhu	Concession	
United Kingdom	Wenzhou	Concession	
Japan	Fuzhou	Concession	
Japan	Xiamen	Concession	
Japan	Yingkou	Concession	
France	Yantai	Concession	
France	Nanjing	Concession	
United States	Wenzhou	Concession	
Italy	Sanmen (Note: Merged into Taizhou in 1940.)	Concession	

== See also ==
- Foreign imperialism in China
- Sick man of Asia
- Century of humiliation
- Unequal treaties
- Treaty ports
- Chinese concession of Incheon
- Chinese Maritime Customs Service
- Tangier International Zone
