= American concession of Shanghai =

American concession in Shanghai during the Qing dynasty

American Concession in Shanghai
- Foreign Enclave
- 1848–1863
- Flag Emblem
- History
  - Established: 1848
  - Disestablished: 21 September 1863
Preceded by	Succeeded by
Shanghai County	Shanghai International Settlement

The American Concession or Settlement was a foreign enclave (a "concession") within present-day Shanghai, which existed from around 1848 until its unification with the city's British area to form the Shanghai International Settlement in 1863.

The concession was located north of the Suzhou River and west of the Huangpu River, in what are today parts of Hongkou District and Jing'an District.

1884 map of Shanghai showing foreign concessions. From north to south: the American Concession (orange), the British Concession (blue), the French Concession (faded red), the Chinese part of the city (yellow).

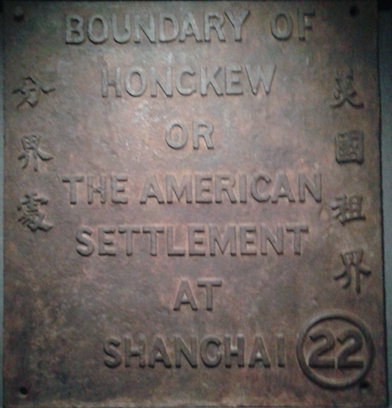
Boundary Stone of the American Settlement in Shanghai.

== History ==
In 1845, the bishop of the American Episcopal Church, W. J. Boone, bought an area in Hongkew to create real estates in Shanghai to build a church. Later, Boone proposed to develop an American settlement, and in 1848, the Shanghai County approved the proposal. On 25 June 1863, American consul George Seward signed an agreement with the head of Shanghai County, Huang Fang (黃芳), to create the American Concession in Shanghai, which also confirmed the boundary of the area. On 21 September 1863, the American area was merged with the British as the Shanghai International Settlement.

== See also ==
- Shanghai International Settlement
- British Concession (Shanghai)
- Shanghai French Concession
- List of former foreign enclaves in China
