= Kulangsu International Settlement =

International settlement in China

Kulangsu International Settlement 鼓浪嶼公共租界
- International Settlement
- 1902–1943

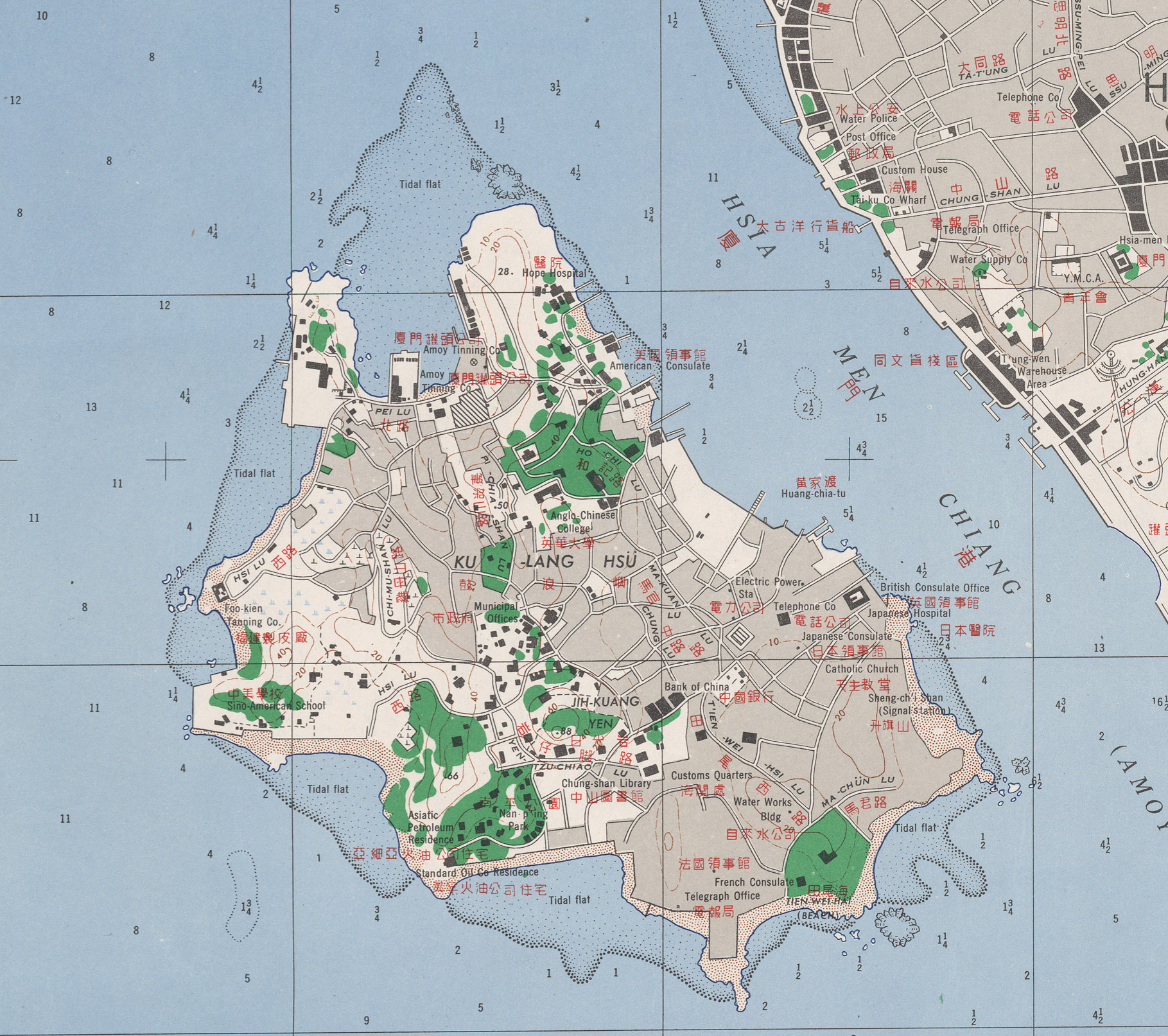
- Kulangsu International Settlement in green Map of Kulangsu International settlement
- History
  - Established: 1902
  - Disestablished: 1943
- Today part of: Gulangyu

Kulangsu International Settlement
- Traditional Chinese: 鼓浪嶼公共租界
- Simplified Chinese: 鼓浪屿公共租界
Transcriptions
Standard Mandarin
- Hanyu Pinyin: Gǔlàngyǔ Gōnggòng Zūjiè
Southern Min
- Hokkien POJ: Kó͘-lōng-sū Kong-kiōng Cho͘-kài

The Kulangsu International Settlement (Chinese: 鼓浪嶼公共租界; pinyin: Gǔlàngyǔ Gōnggòng Zūjiè; Pe̍h-ōe-jī: Kó͘-lōng-sū Kong-kiōng Cho͘-kài) was an international settlement in China (the other being the Shanghai International Settlement) on the Kulangsu or Gulangyu Island of Xiamen, Fujian province. During the Opium Wars, the British Army occupied Gulangyu Island for four years and did not withdraw until 1845. After 1843, Xiamen was opened as a treaty port in accordance with the Sino-British Treaty of Nanking. The United Kingdom also acquired a beach on the coast of Xiamen's main island to build a British concession, while Gulangyu retained its original features. Over time, more nations established embassies as the settlement prospered.

== History ==
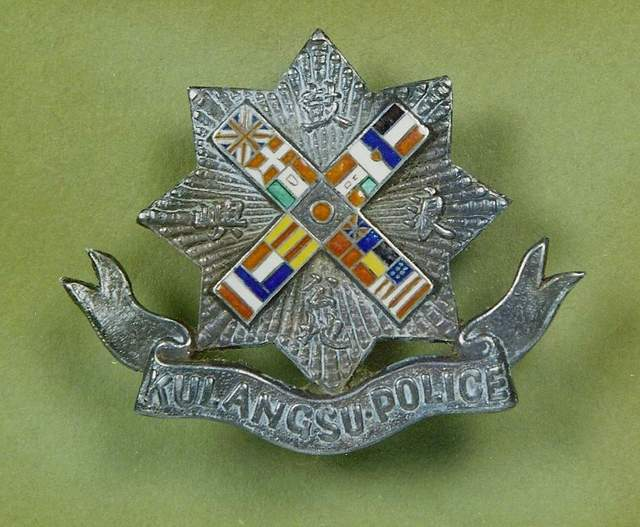
Kulangsu Municipal police badge

After the Japanese occupied Taiwan, local Xiamen authorities, in order to prevent the Japanese from further aiming for Gulangyu, began to float ideas to seek "international protection" and asked European powers to "protect Xiamen". Philip Pitcher presciently notes that there was a sense that "Japan had designs upon Amoy (Xiamen), and that, if a good opportunity offered … she would step in and assume control." The burning of a Japanese Buddhist temple, the Higashi-honganji (东本愿寺) in Gulangyu, coupled with the "Japan Scare" of the 1900s led Beijing to come around to the idea that the establishment of an International settlement for Gulangyu would be beneficial.

On January 10, 1902, the consuls of Great Britain, the United States, Germany, France, Italy, Spain, Denmark, the Netherlands, Sweden-Norway, Japan and another eight countries signed the "Gulangyu delimitation charter" in the Gulangyu Japanese Consulate. Subsequently, in January 1903, the Gulangyu International Settlement Municipal Council was established. By this time, almost all signatories had built consulates on the island. Thus, Xiamen was now divided into two foreign concessions: the British concession in Xiamen (the smaller and entirely commercial area), and Gulangyu (the wealthier and larger concession). As there had already existed a substantial foreign population in Gulangyu before the formation of the International settlement, most of the foreign constructions had been completed by then.

In 1938, after the Japanese attacked and occupied Xiamen, Gulangyu island became an "oasis of peace" as a large number of Chinese refugees moved to Gulangyu to avoid the invasion's consequences. With the outbreak of World War II, Japanese troops were stationed near Gulangyu Island.

Finally, the Gulangyu International Settlement was taken back by the Nationalists. Following the founding of the People's Republic, Gulangyu was made a district of Xiamen city.

== Life in the settlement ==
Those who have lived in the former Settlement have praised life in the Settlement as peaceful and prosperous, especially as China's political situation turned more volatile in the 30s. In fact, its living environment was so improved compared to the dilapidated neighboring city of Xiamen that the sanitation and public security models of Gulangyu were imposed to Xiamen in the 1920s. The foreign occupation built clubs, jails, schools, theaters, and private residences.

As a pure residential settlement, Gulangyu lacked any commercial activities like its sister settlement Shanghai. Therefore, investors did not undertake massive urban planning that would diminish the modest funds of the settlement, but rather improved on the pre-existing infrastructure. Thus, Gulangyu existed as a unique weave between the traditionalist Chinese society and the new wave of foreign colonialism.

During this period, many missionaries came to Gulangyu Island, and the schools they established had a significant impact on modern Chinese education. For example, in 1898, when the British priest Wei Yuzhen and his wife Wei Aili moved to Gulangyu, they founded the first kindergarten in China, the Huaide Kindergarten 怀德幼稚园. The most important missionary school became the Anglo-Chinese College 英华书院 (now known as the Sino-Western Academy 中西学), a spacious campus near Gulangyu's Bijia Hill. These missionary-founded sites gradually interweaved with the pre-existing traditional construction.

There were minimal conflict between the foreign investors and the locals. Foreigners preferred to rent out land along the shores, on hillside, and near farmland. Pre-existing Chinese neighborhoods at lower elevations were rarely disturbed.

== Gallery ==
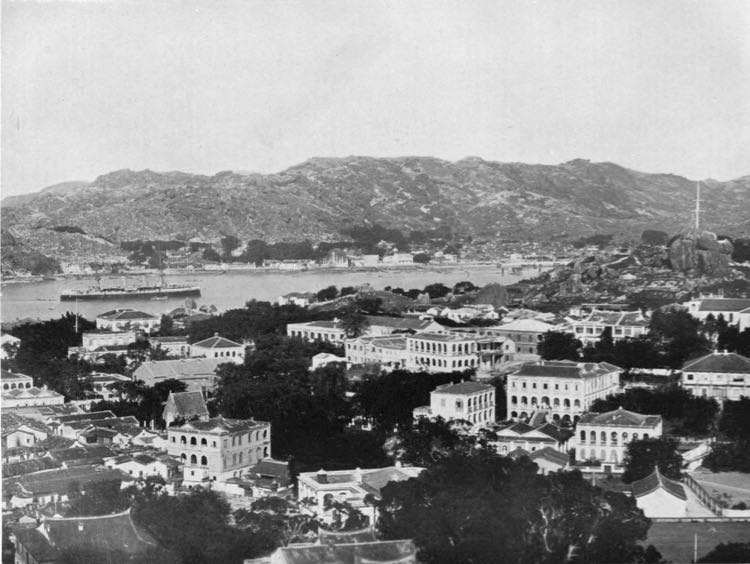
Photo of Gulangyu International Settlement and Amoy (Xiamen)
