= Japanese–Italian War =

World War II conflict (1943–1945)

- Part of the Pacific War
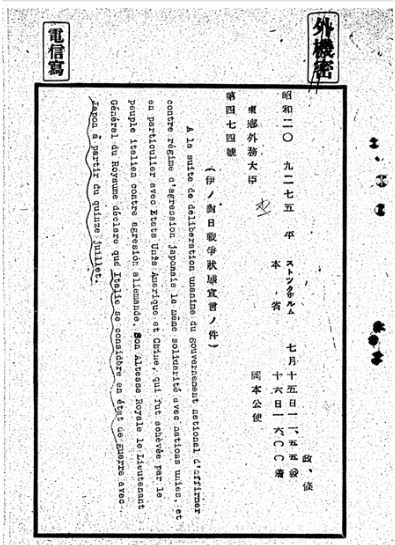
- The picture shows the formal Italian declaration of war on Japan, forwarded by the Ministry of Foreign Affairs of Sweden to the Japanese delegation.
| Date | Defacto: 9 September 1943 – 2 September 1945; Dejure: 15 July 1945 – 1951 |
| Location | China and Japan |
| Result | Italian victory |
| Territorial changes | The Empire of Japan occupies the Italian Concessions in China |

Belligerents
| Japan; Supported by Wang Jingwei regime | Italy United Kingdom (1945) |

Commanders and leaders
| Hisakazu Tanaka; Hiraoka Kumeichi | Carlo dell'Acqua (Captain); Ferruccio Stefenelli; Giovanni Mareschin; Alberto Stebel; Giorgio Galletti; Giuseppe Morante; Roberto de Leonardis |

Strength
| Roughly 7,000 Japanese soldiers 15 light tanks/armored vehicles 2 gunboats undefined number of light artillery | More than 1,079 personnel 300 rifles and pistols 50 machine guns 4 76 mm guns four armored Lancia 1ZM cars Italian destroyer Carabiniere (1938) |

Casualties and losses
| 1943; Undefined heavy losses reported 1945; Unknown | 1943; At least 700 POW; 1945; Unknown; Deaths during imprisonment At least 6 |

The Japanese–Italian War was a war between the Kingdom of Italy and the Empire of Japan, which de facto started on 9 September 1943 with the Japanese attack on the Italian concessions in China, and de jure started on July 15, 1945. All aggressive acts between the two nations ended on 2 September 1945. The peace treaty was officially signed in 1951.

The conflict was the result of an escalation of deteriorating Japanese–Italian relations that started in 1940, and the Armistice of Cassibile. Both nations partly recognized that there was some form of "state of war" declared on 9 September 1943.

== Background ==
=== Japanese–Italian alliance ===
Amid the rise of Fascism in Italy after World War I, the failure of the 1935 Stresa Front, and the Second Italo-Ethiopian War, the Italians joined the Anti-Comintern Pact on 6 November 1937. The Kingdom of Italy and the Japanese government subsequently strengthened their ties. The Italians recognized the Japanese puppet state of Manchukuo on 29 November 1937, and ties between the two nations were also strengthened after the Italian Economic Mission to Japan of 1938.

In 1940, before the Tripartite Pact, pressure on the Italian concessions by the Republic of China was increasing due to Chiang Kai-shek's fear of a possible Japanese–Italian alliance. But Italian consuls at the time dismissed that such an alliance could ever occur, and that Italy would ever join in the European War or support any side in the Second Sino-Japanese War. However, these statements were proven wrong as later that month, Benito Mussolini declared war on the Allied Powers. The alliance between the two nations was officially finalized on 27 September 1940, with the establishment of the Tripartite Pact. The war was harsh on all of the Italian concessions, especially after the Trans-Siberian Railway was officially no longer able to be used by Italy following Operation Barbarossa in June 1941. This meant the concessions were mostly isolated and depended on Japan's favourability to even keep on existing due to their limited amount of battalions stationed in them, including the Battaglione italiano in Cina, founded in 1925, which was not enough on its own.

Deterioration of Italo-Japanese relations

Despite being allies, the Japanese, starting from 1940, continued to pressure the Italians to cede their concessions to their puppet states. Italy would subsequently cede the Italian legation (similarly to the Vichy legation) in the Shanghai International Settlement to the Wang Jingwei regime on 24 July 1943.

By August 1943, the situation had gotten more tense as the Japanese were not satisfied with the Italians leaving the concession in Shanghai, but also wanted them to leave those in Tianjin, Beijing, and all of the remaining minor concessions held by Italy. The tension was also accompanied by a noticeable press campaign by the Wang Jingwei government and in all of China (also sponsored by Japan), which highlighted the presence of Italy as the sole European colonizer who still held onto the concessions in China. Calls to leave the concessions also led various Italian diplomatic representatives to push the Fascist government to leave the colony, as they thought a Japanese intervention in the concession was imminent and that it would be a humiliation for the nation. However, the fascist regime refused to leave.

== The battle of the Italian concessions in China (1943) ==
After the Armistice of Cassibile on 8 September 1943, Francesco Maria Taliani, the Italian ambassador who also partly diplomatically represented the colonies in China officially sided with the King and thus supported the armistice in an official manner. This soon after led to his arrest by the Japanese police and his internment in a Japanese internment camp alongside his wife, the Archduchess Margaretha of Austria, where they would stay up until the end of the war.

Japan felt "betrayed" by the armistice of Cassibile and saw it as the "last straw" in Italy's impertinence against Japan. Japan thus on 9 September 1943, initiatives its first and only real offensive action against Italy, that is the conquest of the Italian concessions in China.

Despite the concessions being fully isolated from Italy and having lost any kind of diplomatic immunity, the personnel within the concessions decided to resist Japanese aggression. The legation in Beijing had 100 people within it available to defend it. In the meanwhile, the Italian concession of Tianjin had 600.

The Italians who were interned after the conflict were held captive in camps located in Japanese Korea, Manchuria and even Japan. After their release, some of them also faced internment in American internment camps on U.S. soil and in the Philippines before being released in 1946, once and for all. The remaining population in the ex-concessions were treated like prisoners, held in dehumanizing conditions and were even denied to see the light of the sun at times.

=== The Italian Beijing legation ===
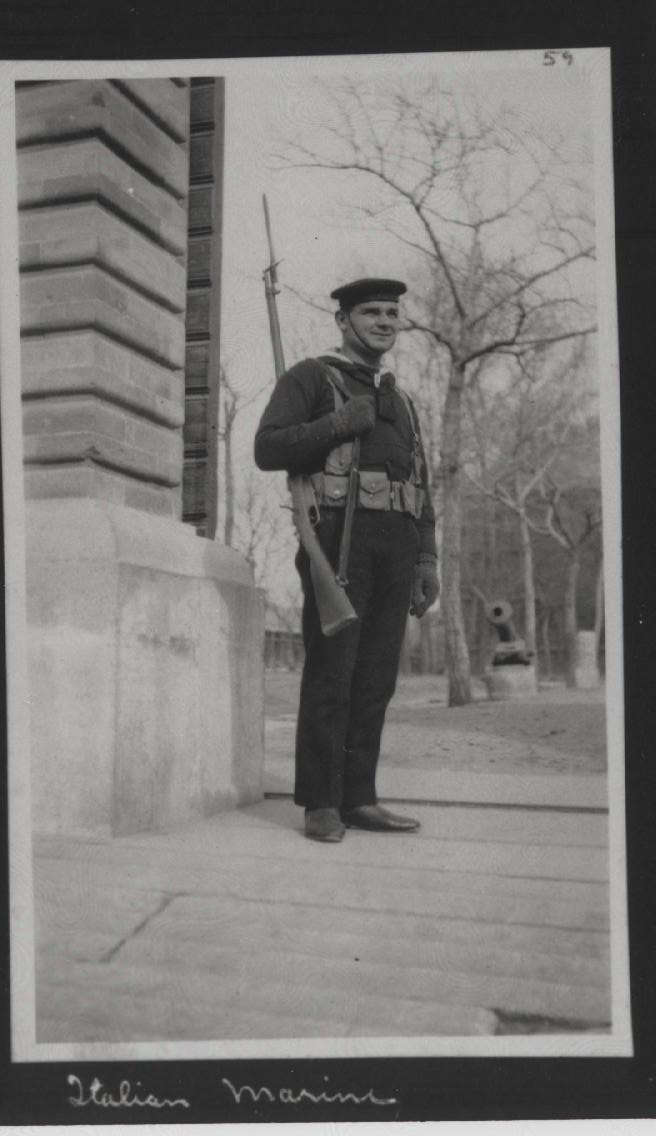
An Italian sailor/marine on guard at the Royal Legation in Beijing, one of the main Italian outposts in China (1919). Protected by 100 soldiers on 9 September 1943. From the J.P. Brown Collection (COLL/3790) at the Marine Corps Archives & Special Collections.

On 9 September 1943, the 100 soldiers stationed in the Italian legation (and radio station) in Beijing fought whilst being armed only with small arms and light weaponry and being surrounded by all sides by 1000 Japanese troops. The Italian fighters resisted for over 24 hours before surrendering, having inflicted heavy losses on the Japanese troops and reporting no losses on their part. They allegedly surrendered as to avoid being outnumbered even further. They were led by Giovanni Mareschin, and most of them on 18 September 1943 adhered to the Italian Social Republic as to avoid internment.

=== The Italian concession of Tianjin ===
The Italian concession of Tianjin was surrounded by 6000 Japanese soldiers and around 15 light tanks, 2 gunboats and an undefined number of light artillery and aerial support, all under the command of Japanese officer Hisakazu Tanaka.

Frigate Captain Carlo dell'Acqua was in the lead of concession's defence alongside the 770 stationed troops. The concession was armed with: 50 Fiat 14/35 , Breda Mod.30 machine guns, 4 75/27 cannons and 4 Lancia 1ZM armoured cars.

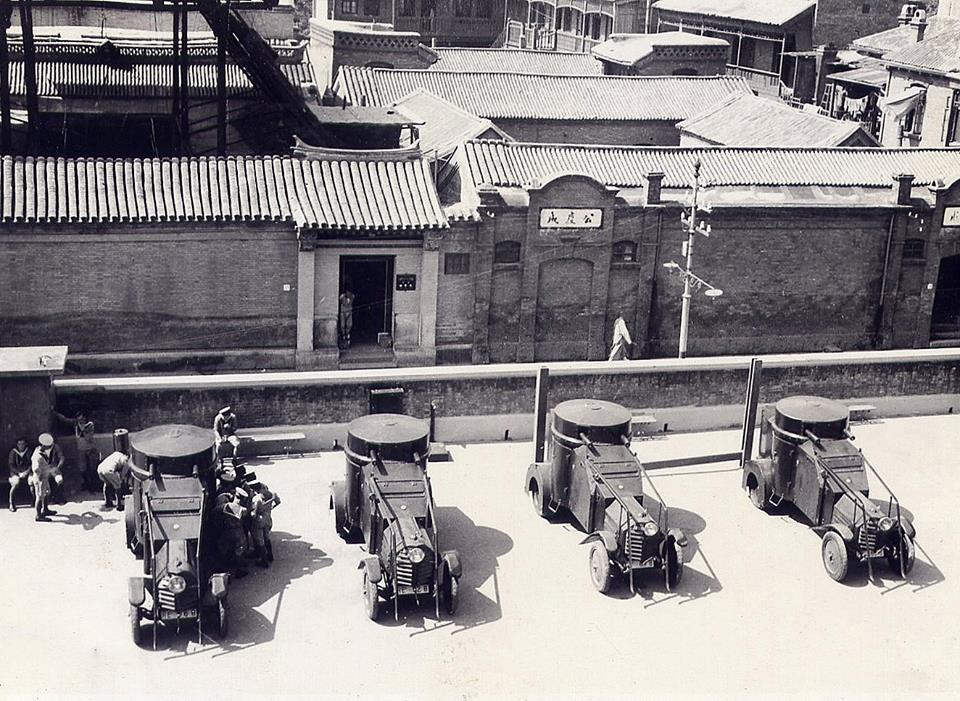
An image of the only four Lancia 1ZMs located in the Italian concession of Tianjin lined up

The Italians, despite being outnumbered decided to once again resist. The reasons on why they did not immediately surrender were multiple, including: The will to safeguard the local Italian and Chinese population from the Japanese, the will to safeguard Ferruccio Stefenelli (the only remaining Italian consul and diplomat in the concession) and to protect Italy's possession. A battle of attrition was thus fought mostly inside the Ermanno Carlotto Barrack, the city council, the forum and in the surrounding areas for roughly a day. The Italians once again managed to hold off the Japanese as in Beijing, and most of the military personnel were ready to continue fighting the Japanese, having the resources to do so for at least a week. Despite this, however, Carlo dell'Acqua decided to surrender on 10 September 1943. This decision was made due to the news of an incoming Japanese division which would bolster the current attacking force.

On 18 September 1943, the Italians captured in Tianjin, similar to the ones in Beijing and in other areas, were given the choice to either swear loyalty to the newly created Italian Social Republic or with the Kingdom of the South and face reclusion in internment camps. 600 remained loyal to the Kingdom of the South, whilst 170 of them swore loyalty to the Fascist regime.

Another 5 men were stationed in Tanggu before being arrested.

=== Italian concession of Shan Hai Kwan Fort ===
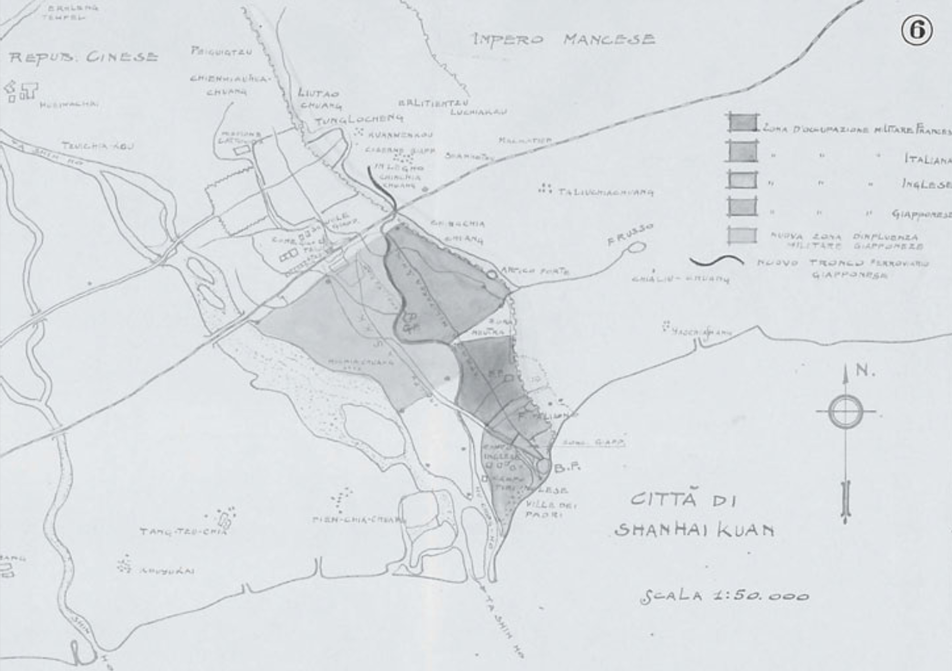
An Italian map of the Shan-Hai-Kwan Chinese foreign concessions c. 1920. The map showcases the French concession, the Japanese one and the Italian one, where the confrontation occurred

The Italian concession of Shan Hai Kwan fort (Shanhai Pass), a pass in the Great Wall of China, was stationed by 10 petty officers and 53 sergeants and sailors. They were commanded by Lieutenant Alberto Stebel, second in command of the military in the concession in Tianjin, later assigned to Shanhai Pass due to the fact he was suffering from tuberculosis. They were later arrested.

=== Italian navy stationed in China ===
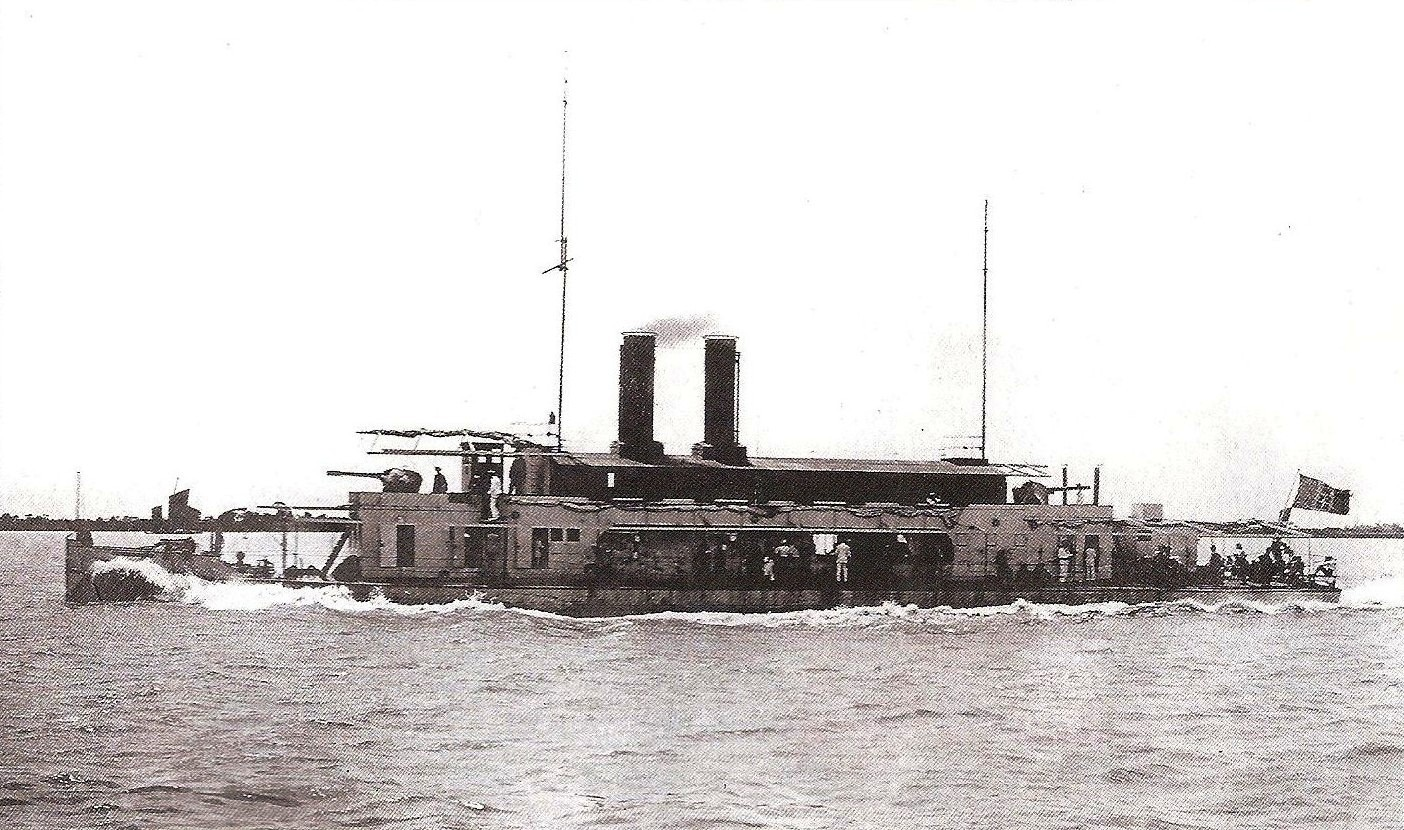
Italian river gunboat Carlotto sailing on a river in China in the late 1930s.

On 9 September 1943, after the Japanese offensive, the Italian Supermarina at the Italian Naval High Command in the Far East ordered all units to sink all of their ships and vessels to prevent the Japanese from seizing them and using them in their own navy and declared that Japan had initiated a "state of war" against Italy. The orders were followed by the naval attaché at the Italian Legation, Captain Giorgio Galletti, both stationed in Shanghai. The vessels that were confirmed to be sunk were the following: The gunboats Lepanto led by Corvette Captain Giuseppe Morante, the gunboat Ermanno Carlotto, led by Lieutenant Roberto de Leonardis, the ocean liner SS Conte Verde, led by Corvette Captain Ugo Chinca. The personnel and the officials were later arrested, their properties were seized and they faced martial law, mock trials and imprisonment in internment camps. Only 29 of the San Marco units of the navy adhered to the Italian Social Republic and were pardoned. Despite not following the orders of the Italian Naval High Command in the Far East, the crew of the Cappellini submarine was sent to internment camps and their submarine was seized and on 10 September was given away to Nazi Germany under the brand new name "UIT-24" and assigned to the "12th U-boat Flotilla".

== Internment of the Italian personnel in Japan ==
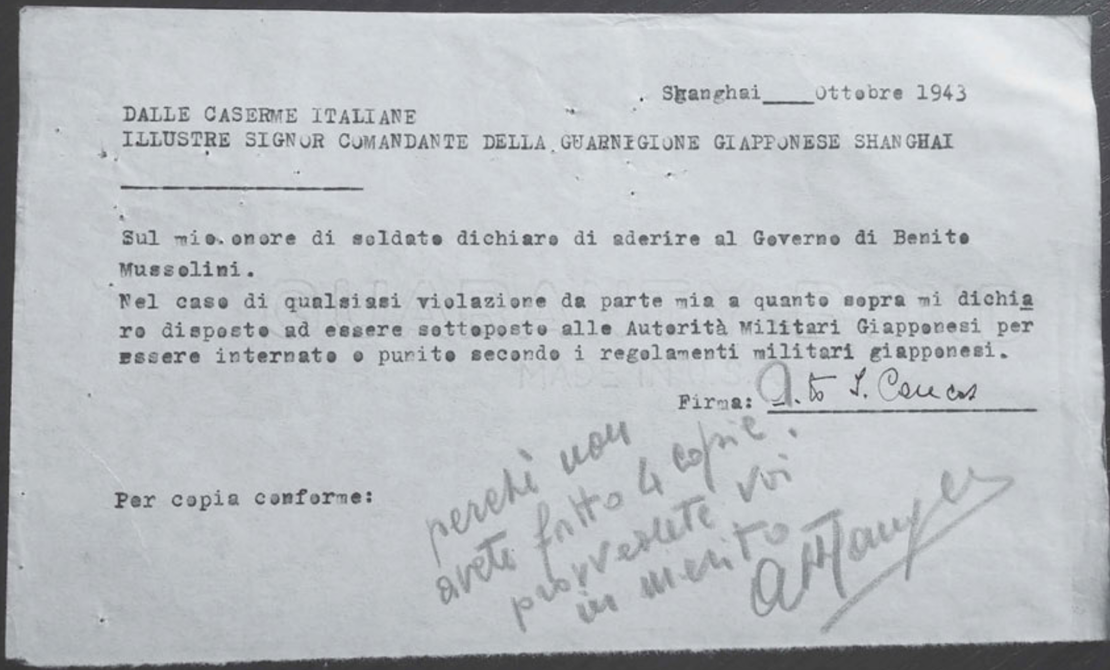
An example of a firmed form for adhering to the Italian Social Republic and submitting to Japanese military law submitted by an Italian barrack in Eastern Asia

Actions against Italian personnel were also conducted by the IJA on Japanese soil. The Italian Embassy in Tokyo was surrounded by the Japanese forces and later raided. Inside the embassy there were Admiral Carlo Balsamo, the Italian naval commander in the Far East, Captain Giuseppe Prelli, who was to conduct an inspection visit to the auxiliary cruiser Calitea II, and the Major Commissioner Gino Benanti. After the self-sinking of the Calitea II, Giuseppe Prelli and Gino Benanti were both imprisoned underground (as main suspects of having ordered the sinking), faced a mock interrogation fully in Japanese, were forced to firm a Japanese contract and were sent to Ofuna internment camp on 14 September. The crew of the Calitea II were captured, continuously interrogated, tortured and sent to various internment camps. The rest of the personnel of the embassy was given a choice to either adhere to the Italian Social Republic or the Kingdom of the South on 19 September. Those who decided to stay loyal to the King of Italy were sent to the Tempa Ku internment camp in Nagoya.

In Kobe a stationed cruiser self-sunk itself immediately after getting the news of the Cassibile Armistice on 8 September, without any recorded order to do so.

The survivors of the Italian vessel called Ada, and renamed by the Japanese as "Ataka Maru", which had been sunk on 22 August 1943, were found by Japanese authorities soon after the armistice. They were captured violently, tortured, questioned and once again sent to internment camps.

All the Italian residents in Japan that did not swear loyalty to the Italian Social Republic were also sent to internment camps on 19 September similarly to the members of the Italian embassy. A notable example was the family of the writer and feminist activist Dacia Maraini, which was put in a Japanese internment camp and suffered inhumane conditions.

== Internment and arrest of Italians in other Japanese-ruled parts of Asia ==
=== Dutch East Indies and Malaysia ===
On 23 September 1943, all of the Italian personnel in Malaysia and Dutch East Indies was disarmed, robbed of personal property and, for the most part, sent to Sime Road camp.

=== Singapore ===
The Italian submarines Giuliani and Torelli, located in Singapore between 8 September 1943 and 9 September 1943, followed the orders of the Supermarina, however, they were intercepted under the orders of Hiraoka Kumeichi and their ships were adopted in the German Navy or the Japanese Navy.

Most of those who adhered to the Italian Social Republic continued to serve under Japanese or German command, or faced a lesser degree of punishment, with the exception of Walter Auconi and his crew. Those who swore loyalty to the Badoglio government were sent to internment camps.

Walter Auconi, in the lead of the Commandante Cappellini, after a negotiation with the Japanese authorities, was forced, with his crew to board the German MV Burgenland on 17 November 1943 and to adhere to the Italian Social Republic, heading back to the port of Bordeaux. The cargo ship was supposed to reach Bordeaux, however, it was sunk in 1944 when crossing international waters by the Allies upon reaching the Southern Atlantic Ocean; Auconi managed to survive and to reach the coasts of Brazil, in Pernambuco, where they were later put in an American internment camp.

Sergeant Raffaello Sanzio, willingly joined the Italian Social Republic, like most of his crew. Sanzio then returned to his submarine, Torelli, and continued to participate for another 20 months, with a mixed Italian-German crew, in the war operations conducted by the German Command at the Penang submarine base against the Allies. After Germany's surrender on May 8, 1945, he chose to collaborate with the Japanese, where he'd move to after the end of the war.

=== Thailand ===
Italians were also captured in Thailand after the Armistice of Cassibile in coordination with Japan, with the Thai government sending them to Japanese-administered camps.

== The years leading up to the Italian declaration of war ==
The Italian Social Republic did not react to the attacks on the Italian concessions, and many of their representatives who swore loyalty to them continued to work with the Japanese. All Italian concessions were later given a status of "teguan qu" (Special Administrative Area) and later officially handed over by the ISR to the Wang Jingwei regime on 27 July 1944.

The First Badoglio government (and the following governments) attempted to preserve some diplomatic immunity to many of the imprisoned Italians, even asking Switzerland to be an intermediary, however, this failed due to Japanese reluctance to co-operate, seeing the Badoglio government as an enemy of war and not as the legitimate Italian government.

== The Italian declaration of war (1945) ==
The idea of an official Italian declaration of war against Japan was suggested by Alberto Tarchiani, an Italian diplomat in Washington D.C in early 1945 during the Parri government. He first suggested the idea to Clement Dunn, Joseph Grew, Edward Stettinius, James Francis Byrnes and two days later to President Roosevelt (40 days before his death), all of which thought it was a good idea. Tarchiani also informed Soviet diplomat Andrei Gromyko about the idea; However, he allegedly laughed at his face and taunted him, saying that "Trieste would be Yugoslav". Tarchiani thought that formally declaring war on Japan would have put Italy on a good spot in the eyes of its allies, it would have pressured Japan to pay reparations and to release the Italians they had captive and would have also guaranteed economical help in the future to help Italy rebuild itself following the war (Similarly to what happened with the Marshall Plan).

The Italian government supported the idea for other reasons, including to somewhat counter the role of the Soviet Union in a hypothetical peace treaty which involved them in Japan and realpolitik considerations.

On 23 June 1945, Alcide De Gasperi telegraphed the Americans asking them if an Italian declaration of war would have made the United Kingdom trust the new Italian government and make a punitive peace treaty by them less likely. This worry came from the fact that Anthony Eden and Winston Churchill openly supported a punitive treaty towards Italy at the time. Later, De Gasperi prompted Tarchiani to ask the American authorities about it directly, to which the U.S. representatives responded by saying that some elements in the British Foreign Office were still staunchly anti-Italian and that it'd be best if Italy declared war on Japan before the Potsdam Conference as to prove those elements wrong.

On 4 July 1945, De Gasperi once again telegraphed the American authorities, stating that Palmiro Togliatti and Pietro Nenni were unsure if the intervention was legal due to the terms of the Italian armistice. Overall the government, whilst still in a phase of debates, seemed to mostly agree on a declaration of war. This war-approval was later confirmed when Tarchiani informed De Gasperi on 12 July that the Soviets were going to announce they would soon declare war to Japan during the Potsdam Conference.

On 14 July 1945, a declaration of war was sent to the Swedish Ministry of Foreign Affairs which acted as an intermediary. The declaration was later sent to the Japanese diplomats on 15 July 1945, when it officially took effect. De Gasperi later informed once again the Americans to support a non-punitive resolution for Italy at Potsdam, and he also informed Soviet Deputy of People's Commissar for Foreign Affairs, Solomon Lozovsky, who confirmed that the United States and the United Kingdom both supported and appreciated the initiative and that it would have an impact on their part at Potsdam.

On 26 July 1945 the Allied command in the Mediterranean declared that all of the remaining Italian ships were unsuitable for oceanic warfare, and thus were not ready to transport any forces to fight in the Pacific. After that, the Chief of Staff of the Italian Air Force offered to send a crew with the following equipment: 2 Bomber and Liaison Wings (72 aircraft) and 3 Fighter and C/B [fighter-bomber] Wings (216 aircraft) fully equipped with material which would have to be supplied by the Allies, also stating that any Italian battalion would have to be autonomous (in its command structure) from the Allied command structure, as proposed by the Ministry of War. However, such demands were swiftly rejected by the Allies. A stated reason on why the Allies were hesitant in entrusting Italian navy leading personnel to lead an independent front against the Japanese was due to the fact that they thought that the Italian leading personnel was not competent enough to fight the Japanese by themselves, with the Americans and the British suggesting that, whilst the Italian navy should have been used in the struggle against Japan, the ships should have been led by British and American leadership, and with Italian presence limited to the crew.

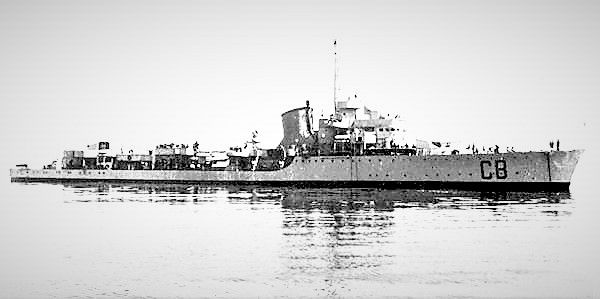
The destroyer Carabiniere then in service with the Regia Marina

On 27 July 1945, the Italian head of the Ministry of War, Stefano Jacini, informed De Gasperi that he was planning to create an "expeditionary force" of 6,000 to 8,000 individuals who'd be sent (thanks to the help of the Allies) to Japan after 4 months of training, thus in November 1945 during the planned Operation Downfall. The only Italian crew and ship which fought against the Japanese after the declaration of war was the destroyer Italian destroyer Carabiniere, which had been preparing since May 1945 prior to the declaration of war and departed right after the declaration was made public. The destroyer would go on to participate in 38 missions of anti-aircraft and anti-submarine escort to British warships and SAR operations, gaining the praises of Admiral Arthur Power of the Eastern Fleet.

On 9 August 1945, Italy attempts to gain some form of influence on Japan's peace treaty, however, the Allies do not allow it. Italy in return, does not sign any peace treaty with Japan even after the war is effectively over.

== The diplomatic war (1945–1952) ==
As previously mentioned, although active hostilities had ended, Italy and Japan remained technically at war after World War II. This unresolved legal status affected diplomatic relations between the two countries and soon enough evolved into a diplomatic conflict.

Following September 2, 1945, a significant amount of Italians was still within Japan's internment camps, something the Italian government thought had to be solved in an immediate effect (as, freeing them was one of Italy's war goals). U.S. planes had already started flying over the locations of various detention camps within Japan and its occupied territories dropping aid and leaflets informing the prisoners that they'd soon be liberated and that the eldest or the most high-ranking POW in the camp must give the Japanese guards orders for the daily management of the camp. Mario Indelli, an Italian ambassador to Japan, who was being held as a prisoner of war by the Japanese in a camp, issued a warning to the Japanese police operating in his camp, which stated as following:

According to instructions received from the Allied Powers, the Japanese police have ceased to exercise any authority over us. I therefore assume command of the camp, and the chief police officer, Mr. Hori, is placed under my command and will be held responsible for the execution of the orders by the other Japanese police officers. I also ordered Mr. Hori to hand over all weapons in the possession of the Japanese, cameras, other items previously confiscated, and all official documents about us. I warn you that any resistance will be punished. Mr. Hori must also provide us, by today, with the best radio available in Kemanai.

— Memorandum signed by Erik von Sydow, chargé d'affaires of Sweden in Japan, in ASDMAE, AP, 1931–45, Japan, file 37

The camp was effectively under Indelli's command up until 14 September 1945, when the allies arrived in Kemanai and sent the prisoners to a luxury hotel near Tokyo, in Miyanoshita. Every diplomat or high-ranking official was soon after assigned back to their role prior to their imprisonment.

The head of the European section of the Japanese Ministry of Foreign Affairs was not happy about this conduct. On 9 January 1946, Toru Hagiwara summoned the Swedish chargé d'affaires and notified him that he was in charge of any "Italian affairs" and that he and the Ministry as a whole was displeasured at the way in which the Italians detained in Kemanai had been freed and the way Indelli took the charge of the camp without their approval. This soon after turned into a diplomatic incident. This was followed by an accusation according to which some of the previously detained Italian diplomats who were allegedly associated with the National Liberation Committee had reportedly stolen a car from an embassy, something both the Swedish Foreign Ministry and the Italian Foreign Ministry agreed was impossible given the circumstances.

Another diplomatic incident occurred in October 1945, when the Japanese Ministry of Foreign Affairs was considering to intern the Italian diplomats once more. This was to be done while waiting to find out the treatment reserved for the Japanese ambassador Hidaka, accredited to the Republic of Salo, and how to respond to it. On 17 October 1945 Toru Hagiwara was once again sent by the ministry, this time to the Allied Headquarter, where he sent a request firmed by him titled "reciprocity in the treatment of Japanese diplomats in Italy and Italian diplomats in Japan" in support of the Ministry's previous statement. The Allies responded negatively and stated that the question of Japanese diplomats in Italy was a question that did not concern Hagiwara's office. The Italian diplomats were ultimately fully freed in the Spring of 1946.

Issues started to bubble up once again following 1950, when the United States confirmed that Italy would not be part of the Treaty of San Francisco and would have to firm a peace treaty with Japan separately.

Italy however was not satisfied by the lack of reparations and accountability the Japanese were facing. Italy believed that the imprisonment of the Italian diplomats by Japan from 1943 to 1946, and their attempts to detain them once again after the war was over, were serious violations of the Geneva Convention, and they refused to firm a peace treaty without resolving such an issue. They also believed up until 1951 that they should have been repaired for the damages caused by the "war which started in 1943 against the Badoglio government".

The Japanese government always denied any kind of violation of the Geneva Convention against Italy, and also stated that any declaration of war between 9 September 1943 and 18 September 1943 was only valid up until the creation of the Republic of Salo because by then Japan had stopped recognizing Badoglio's government, and thus any "state of war" prior to that "had been nullified". Regardless of this, despite not offering reparations, the Japanese government offered to apologize to the Italian government. Italy once again rejected this, and instead proposed (alternatively to reparations) to simply sign a proper peace treaty through an exchange of official notes which would, as previously proposed, solve the various diplomatic issues amongst the two nations and allow for relations to return to normalcy.

In 1951, the peace treaty was signed ending the "state of war" between the nations, with some revisions to it to be held in the following years in regards to reparations.

After Japan's partial agreement, Italy with a presidential decree on 20 April 1952, stated that Italy would "postpone to a later date the settlement of the issues that arose between the two countries, as a consequence of the state of war and as a result of measures taken by the authorities of the two countries". The fact that the document stated "as a result of measures taken by the authorities of the two countries" was due to a Japanese regarding the death of Vice admiral Toyo Mitsunobu, who died in the proximity of Tuscany in 1944 by the hands of a group of Italian partisans led by Manrico "Pippo" Ducceschi. Some of the ex-detainees, including a man called Pasquale Iannelli, complained about this, stating that Japan had committed their atrocities even before a mutual declaration of war, and that Italy had not taken any measure against the Japanese which should need reparations for.

On September 25, 1952, the Japanese and the Italians sent a second exchange of official letters in which Japan formally apologized for their misconduct, whilst highlight that it was caused by an "unfortunate occurrence of events and special circumstances". Japan also promised to pay reparations in the near future. Ultimately Japan paid reparations to the Italian state on July 18, 1972.
