= Toru Hagiwara =

Japanese diplomat

- A photograph of Toru Hagiwara taken by Studio Harcourt

Ambassador

Personal details
- Born: May 1906 Tokyo, Japanese Empire
- Died: 12 October 1979 (aged 73)

Toru Hagiwara (Tokyo, May 1906 – 12 October 1979) was a Japanese ambassador. He served key roles after World War II during the Allied Occupation of Japan and its aftermath.

== Biography and career ==
He was born in May 1906 in Tokyo, from a family which traditionally served diplomatic positions within the government. He would go on to graduate in the University of Tokyo’s Faculty of Law and pass the Foreign Service entrance exam in 1927. He would thus join the Ministry of Foreign Affairs in 1928, at the start of the Showa era. By the end of World War II, in 1945, he'd be granted the title of Treaty Bureau Director, making him a key individual in the negotiations for a peace treaty in Japan.

In fact, he had proposed early forms of a peace treaty as early as in 1945, suggesting to restore Japan’s international legal status, sovereignty, membership in the United Nations (with immediate membership) and negotiations on Japan's reparations (in order to satisfy Allied demands, but at the same time avoiding crippling debts). He especially played a vital role in the diplomatic part of the Japanese-Italian War.

In fact, On 9 January 1946 he summoned the Swedish chargé d'affaires and notified him that he was in charge of any "Italian affairs" and that he and the Ministry as a whole was displeasured at the way in which the Italians detained in Kemanai had been freed and the way Mario Indelli took the charge of the camp without their approval. This escalated the diplomatic crisis between Italy and Japan, in which Hagiwara denounced the procedure, refused to free some Italian POWs and made accusations against them up until 17 October 1945, when the Allied Headquarter stated that such matters did not concern his office, later forcing the release of all prisoners of war from Italy in 1946.

In late 1946 and early 1947, he started to write a general peace treaty proposal he showcased to the cabinet, before writing on 8 July 1947 a proposal named "General Consideration on Japan’s Territorial Problems". On 24 July 1947, he would be one of the people to firm the Ashida Memorandum and later on backed Hitoshi Ashida in 1948. He supported a bilateral security pact with the U.S. coupled with Japan’s self‐defense buildup, with significantly limited foreign presence within Japan proper, including militarily.

In 1952 he published “The Peace Treaty with Japan and Japan’s Position” in a diplomatic journal. (His drafts and reports on the Peace Treaty were later included in Japanese diplomatic archive). This marked his participation in the Treaty of San Francisco.

From 1957 to 1961 he was an ambassador in Canada for Japan.

In 1972 he served as President (Chair) of the UNESCO General Conference that adopted the 1972 World Heritage Convention. At the time he was the ambassador in France.

In 1978 he testified before the U.S. Senate Foreign Relations Committee (as an adviser to Japan’s Foreign Minister) on international financial matters. He would die one year later, on 12 October.

== Literature ==
In 1950 he would go on to write "Daisen no Kaibō: Beiei no Senryaku: Nihon Kōfuku made no Daisen no Senryaku", published by Yomiuri Shimbun.

== Awards ==
He'd be awarded the Grand Cordon of the Order of the Sacred Treasure, First Class.
