= Nobuo Kanda =

Japanese historian

Kanda Nobuo
- Born: October 2, 1921; Kyoto, Japan
- Died: December 30, 2003 (aged 82); Tokyo, Japan
- Other name: 神田 信夫
- Occupation: historian
- Relatives: father:Kiichiro Kanda－bibliographer of oriental studies

Professor Nobuo Kanda (神田 信夫, Kanda Nobuo; October 2, 1921 – December 30, 2003) was a Japanese historian who specialized in early Manchu history.

== Biography ==
He was born in Kyoto. He spent his early life in Taipei until he entered Tokyo Imperial University in 1941. He was appointed to an assistant professor in 1949 at Meiji University and taught there until 1992. He led various academies. In 1964 he participated in launching the annual "Nojiriko Khuriltai", a conference of Altaist scholars.

He approached the history of the Qing dynasty though Manchu literature. As a member of a study group on Manchu, he published the Manwen Laodang with romanized text, word-by-word translation, complete translation and notes from 1955 to 1963. He frequently visited Taiwan to study the source archive of the Manwen Laodang, namely the Jiu Manzhou Dang. After Japan severed diplomatic relations with the ROC, he promoted the investigation of Manchu archives stored in Beijing. He also made efforts to identify historical materials that scattered around Europe and the U.S.
