= Giuseppe Morante =

Italian naval officer (1909–1992)

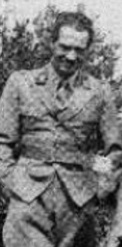
- An image of Giuseppe Morante in his uniform
- Born: 19 May 1909; Benevento, Kingdom of Italy
- Died: 8 April 1992 (aged 82) Rome, Republic of Italy
- Allegiance: Kingdom of Italy (1930–1946); Republic of Italy (1946–1967) and NATO (1956–1958)
- Service years: 1930–1967
- Rank: Division Admiral
- Known for: His role in the Japanese-Italian War
- Conflicts: Second Italo-Ethiopian War (1935–1936); The Battle of the Italian Concessions in China (1943)
- Spouse: Iolanda Gironi Morante

Giuseppe Morante (Benevento 19 May 1909 – Rome 8 April 1992) was a lieutenant commander (and later Division Admiral) known for his role in the Japanese-Italian War. He was in charge of the command of the Italian ironclad Lepanto, alongside his second in command, Guglielmo Stevens. He made the decision to sink the ironclad alongside the presence of Roberto De Leonardis.

== Biography and career ==
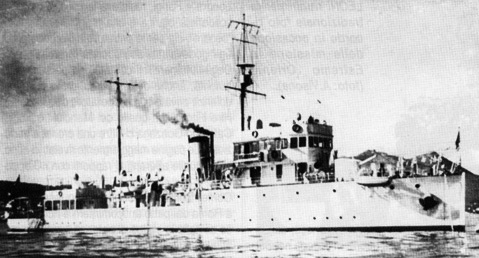
A photograph of the ironclad Lepanto

He was born in Benevento on 19 May 1909. He started to study in the Italian Naval Academy in Livorno in 1925 (at age 16), and managed to gain the rank of midshipman in 1930 (at age 21). The very first battleship he served in was the Italian battleship Duilio, a dreadnought. He was later assigned as a second lieutenant on the Italian destroyer Luca Tarigo and during his service there, on 8 April 1932, in the Tyrrhenian Sea, he rescued up to three shipwrecked individuals in a situation of rough sea, earning him the Silver Medal for Naval Valor. Starting from 1933 he was part of the academy of aerial observation of Taranto. He was promoted to the rank of lieutenant in 1935, and in the same year he was sent to fight on the support ship Antonio Pacinotti in the Second Italo-Ethiopian War. In January 1939 he was sent to China, where he was given the role of second in command commander and later commander. He would later be given the rank of corvette captain in 1941, and he was the second in command on the Italian sloop Eritrea, before being assigned the leadership of the Italian ironclad Lepanto.

Giuseppe would learn of the Armistice of Cassibile in the night between 8-9 September from Captain Giorgio Galletti, who then also communicated him the order by the supermarina to self-sink all of the ships located in China at the time. Realizing that the ship lacked sufficient fuel to leave Shanghai, Morante decided to carry out the order. He oversaw the destruction of classified documents and funds, directed the flooding of the engine room and interior compartments, and organized the discreet evacuation of the crew to avoid alerting Japanese authorities. Right before he carried out the orders, there were attempts by two members of the crew, Rodolfo Brusadin and Roberto De Leonardis, who tried to change his mind, but to no avail. He was later arrested by Japanese authorities and subjected to a trial, in which, he avoided the death penalty by a whim due to the argument of a Japanese lawyer according to which the Italians were merely carrying out the orders of their country due to the Republic of Salo having yet to be founded, and thus they had not committed treason. He was thus sent to various Japanese concentration camps in China, including Weixian Internment Camp, Kiangwan Prison Camp, and Feng-tai internment camp. He was later sent to Japan where he'd stay for the rest of his imprisonment before being released on 30 August 1945 by the US Army, before being sent to the Philippines in June 1946 and returning to Italy on the same year on the Italian sloop Eritrea. He was awarded the Silver Medal of Military Valor for following Galletti's orders despite knowing the risks and also a solemn commendation.

He continued his service in the Italian Navy and in 1948 he was promoted to the rank of frigate captain before being given the rank of ship captain in 1955. He was assigned to lead a corvette squadron and was put in lead of Italy's naval supply lines. This is the period where he gained prominence in NATO, and soon became a naval attaché in Tehran, Iran. He was put in charge of the Navy Petty Officer School in Taranto in Brindisi. In 1963 he reached the rank of rear admiral before being forced to retire from active service due to his age in 1967. Despite being retired though, he was given the rank of (auxiliary) Division Admiral.

He died on 8 April 1992 in Rome.

== Awards ==
Silver Medal of Military Valor - ribbon for ordinary uniform

- Silver Medal for Naval Valor (1932)
- Silver Medal of Military Valor (1946)
