= Lancia 1ZM =

Italian armoured car

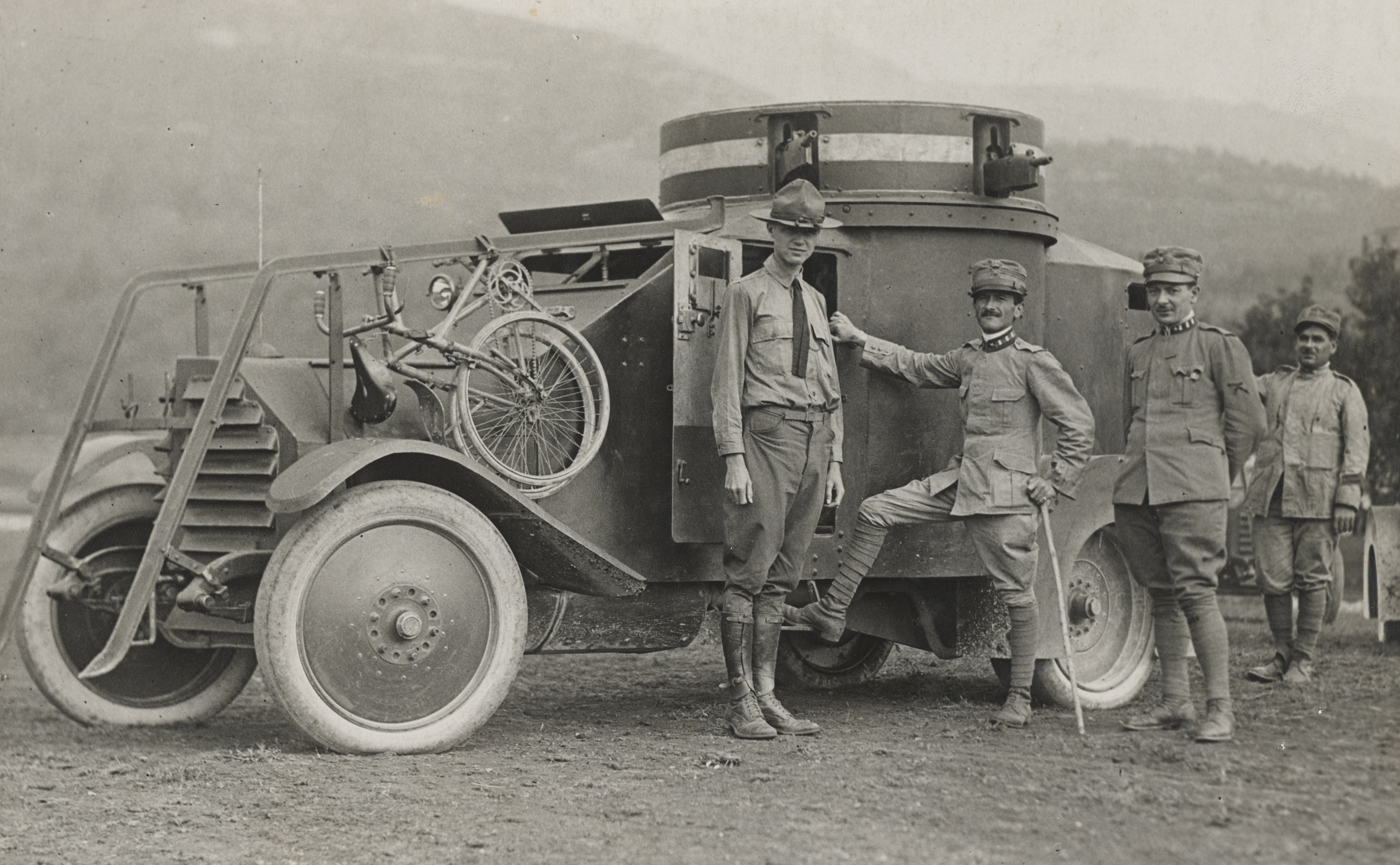
- Lancia Ansaldo 1Z in October 1918
- Type: Armoured car
- Place of origin: Italy

Service history
- Used by: Italy, Austro-Hungary
- Wars: World War I Second Italo-Ethiopian War; Spanish Civil War; World War II World War I.

Production history
- Manufacturer: Ansaldo for Lancia
- Produced: 1914 (1Z), 1918 (1ZM)
- No. built: 10 (1Z), 110 (1ZM)

Specifications
- Mass: 3.70 tonnes
- Length: 5.40 m (17 ft 9 in)
- Width: 1.824 m (5 ft 11.8 in)
- Height: 2.40 m (7 ft 10 in) with single turret
- Crew: 6
- Armour: 9 mm
- Main armament: Two 8 mm machine guns
- Secondary armament: One 8 mm machine gun (1Z only)
- Engine: One petrol engine. 35/40hp
- Operational range: 300 km (190 mi)
- Maximum speed: 60 km/h (37 mph) on-road.

The Lancia 1Z and the Lancia 1ZM were two variations of an Italian armoured car built during World War I and which saw limited service during that war, the interwar period, and during World War II. The name is often misspelled as Lancia IZM. During the First World War, the Austro-Hungarian Empire acquired a few units from the Italian front.

== Design ==
In 1916, the Lancia 1Z armoured car was built by Ansaldo of Italy. It was the most common of the early Italian armoured cars. Based on a Lancia truck, the armoured car was an advanced design for its day. For firepower the vehicle was equipped with twin turret mounted machine guns. The initial ten vehicles featured a further small turret on top with yet another machine gun. This gave the vehicle considerable firepower for the time. As a result of experiences in World War I, steel rails were installed over the top of the vehicle for cutting wire. Having had good results with the early car, another production run of a slightly modified version (the Lancia 1ZM) or "Model 1918" was ordered. The major difference between the 1Z and 1ZM was that the 1ZM did not have the top turret with the extra machine gun.

The Lancia 1ZM was the second batch of Ansaldo-Lancia armoured cars built. 110 cars of the improved model were ordered in 1917 and all were delivered before the end of 1918. Sometimes difficult to identify from the original Lancia 1Z ("Model 1916"), the most obvious difference is the removal of the top machine gun turret. This left the 1ZM with just the one larger, twin machine gun turret. Other features that will help are that the first 1ZM's usually have two spare tyres mounted on the right side of the vehicle (on the 1Z they were under the rear). The cooling vents and front armour of the engine compartment are slightly different and there are fewer vision ports in the armoured crew compartment. The front bumpers were also simplified. However, some of the original 1Z series were modified to initial 1ZM standard by the removal of the extra top turret and up-dating the chassis. This makes it possible to find photos of 1ZM armoured cars with both 1Z and 1ZM features. American troops on the Italian Front during World War I trained with and used some of these vehicles.

== In combat ==
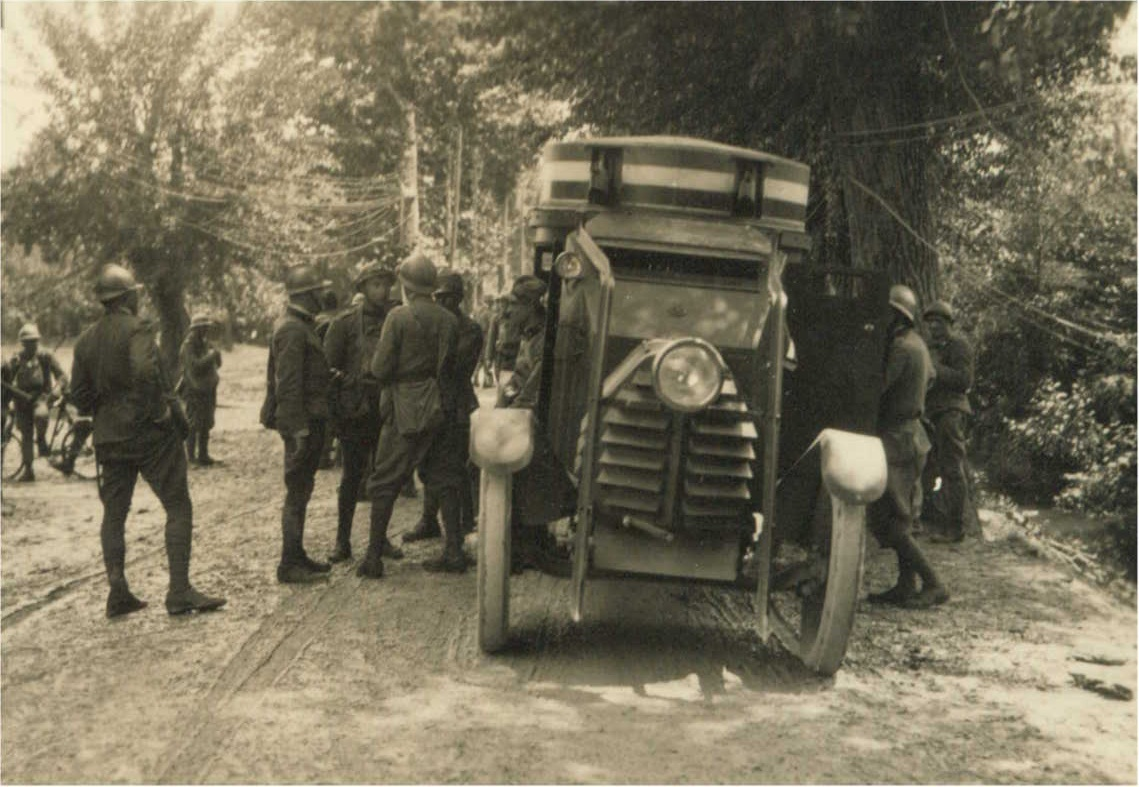
1Z armoured car during the Battle of Vittorio Veneto

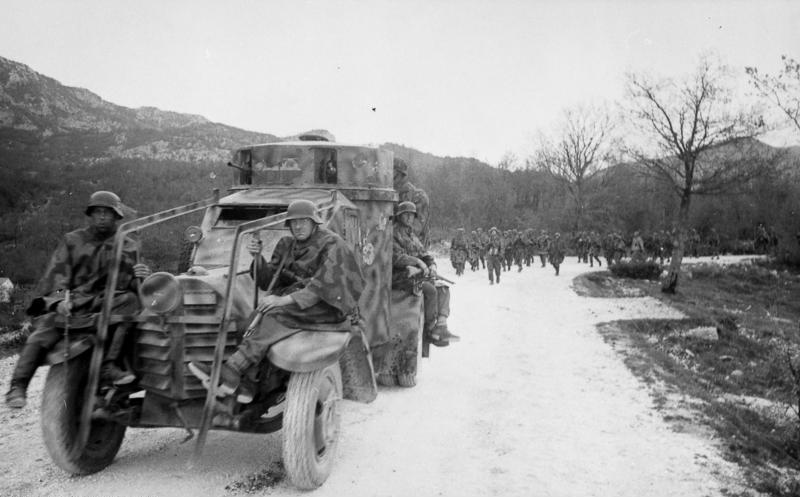
Obsolete Lancia pressed into German service in Yugoslavia, 1943 (Lancia 1ZM Panzerspähwagen, PK 501)

The Lancia 1Z/1ZM armoured car saw little combat in World War I due to the mountainous terrain in which the Italian Royal Army (Regio Esercito) fought. However, a few were deployed in the northern parts of the country where they saw combat against the Austro-Hungarian Army. A Lancia 1Z captured by the Austro-Hungarian Army was assigned, along with one Romfell armoured car, two Junovicz P.A.1 armored cars, a captured Isotta-Fraschini armored car and a captured Austin armored car to K.u.K. Panzerautozug No.1 near Udine in June 1918, where the unit saw little to no action.

After World War I, Lancia 1Z/1ZM armoured cars were sent to North Africa and to East Africa for policing duties. A few cars were also sent to the Albanian Kingdom where they were to form the sole armoured force of the country for many years. Some Lancia 1Z/1ZMs played a minor role during the Italian invasion and the occupation of Ethiopia. Some Lancia 1Z/1ZMs were sent to Spain during the Spanish Civil War and were used by the Italian Corps of Volunteer Troops (Corpo Truppe Volontarie Italia, or CTV). These armoured cars were already hopelessly outdated by this point and performed poorly against the Spanish Republican forces.

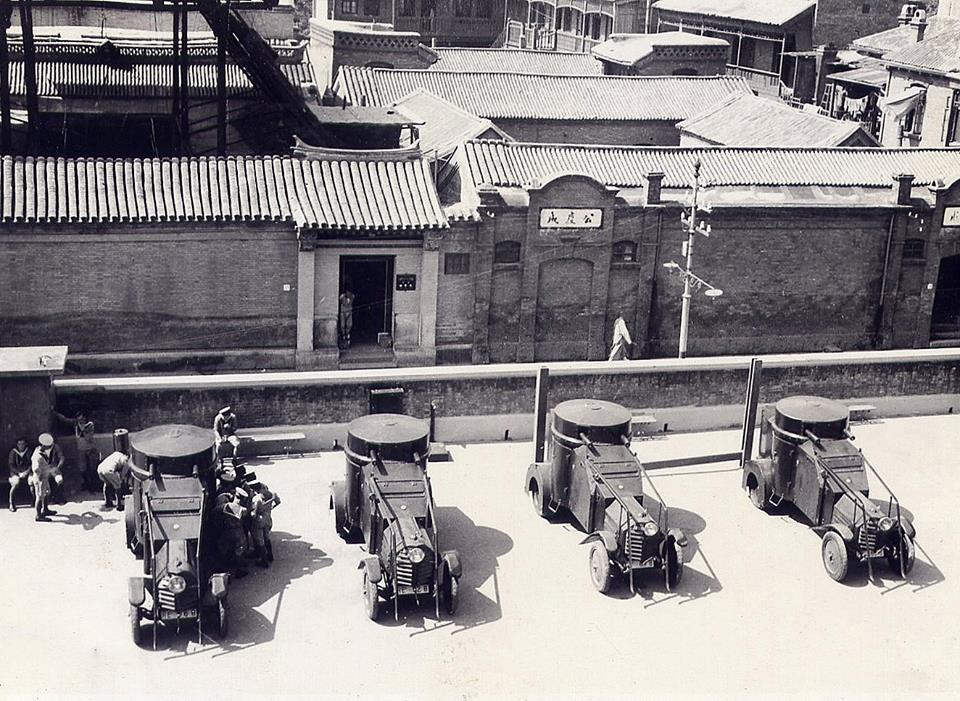
An image of the only four Lancia 1ZMs located in the Italian concession of Tianjin lined up

A few obsolete Lancia 1Z/1ZM armoured cars were still in use with the Italian Royal Army during World War II. In 1940 and 1941, several vehicles served with the Royal Army during the East African Campaign. In some instances, operable machines were pressed into service by other Axis forces after the Armistice of Cassibile in September 1943. In the service of the forces of Nazi Germany, the vehicle was identified as the Panzerspähwagen 1ZM (i). Four Lancia 1ZM were located in the Italian concession of Tianjin during the Japanese-Italian War.

== Operators ==
- Kingdom of Italy
- Kingdom of Albania
- Kingdom of Afghanistan
- Austria
- Austria-Hungary
- (Germany) German Empire
- (Czech Republic) Czechoslovakia
- Kingdom of Hungary
- Nazi Germany
