= Giorgio Galletti =

Italian military officer (1901–1983)

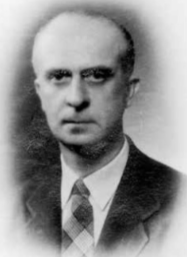
- An image of Giorgio Galletti in the 1930s–1940s
- Born: 6 August 1901; Rome, Kingdom of Italy
- Died: 1 February 1983 (aged 81) Bangkok, Thailand
- Rank: Rear admiral
- Conflicts: World War I; Italian Somali Wars; Japanese-Italian War

Giorgio Galletti (Rome, 6 August 1901 – Bangkok, 1 February 1983) was an Italian rear admiral and a knight official of the military orders of Order of the Crown of Italy and the Order of the Star of Italy. He is most widely known for his role in the Japanese-Italian War.

== Biography ==
He was born on 6 August 1901 in Rome. He would go on to be admitted in the Italian Naval Academy of Livorno in 1914 (aged 13). Between 1915 and 1916, despite being 14-15 years old, and having no significant rank as of yet, he participated in World War I on the Italian corvette Flavio Gioia. He would be given the rank of midshipman in 1919 (aged 18). He was given the rank of second lieutenant during the Italian Somali Wars, where he fought under general Arimondi and major Toselli. He was later given the command of the Italian navy in Somalia between 1933 and 1935, and also the command of the Italian destroyer Strale (1931). In 1937 he was sent to China for the very first time as a frigate captain, before being sent back to the Kingdom of Italy in order to work for the Servizio Informazioni dello Stato Maggiore Marina. He would return in China and be stationed in Nanking from 1 October 1941 up until 8 September 1943, with the rank of vessel captain being assigned to him in 1942. On the night between 8–9 September 1943, learning of the Armistice of Cassibile, he ordered the sinking of the Italian minelayer Lepanto, the Ermanno Carlotto, the SS Conte Verde and the Calitea in the territories of China and Japan. Giuseppe Morante, Roberto De Leonardis, Ugo Chinca and Pasquale Mazzella followed his orders. This got him arrested, and he was subjected to a trail, in which, he avoided the death penalty by a whim due to the argument of a Japanese lawyer according to which the Italians were merely carrying out the orders of their country due to the Republic of Salo having yet to be founded, and thus they had not committed treason. He was put in a very harsh internment camp before being rescued by the US army on 30 August 1945. The US army restrained him to the Philippines up until 13 May 1947, when he was allowed to leave. For his actions he was awarded the War Cross of Military Valor. Despite leaving the navy on 1 February 1948, he would go on to be given the (auxiliary) rank of rear admiral in 1956. He would go on to live in French Indochina after the war, before moving in Thailand following the First Indochina War.

He would die in Bangkok on 1 February 1983.

== Awards ==
War Cross of Military Valor

- War Cross of Military Valor (1947)
