= Romfell armoured car =

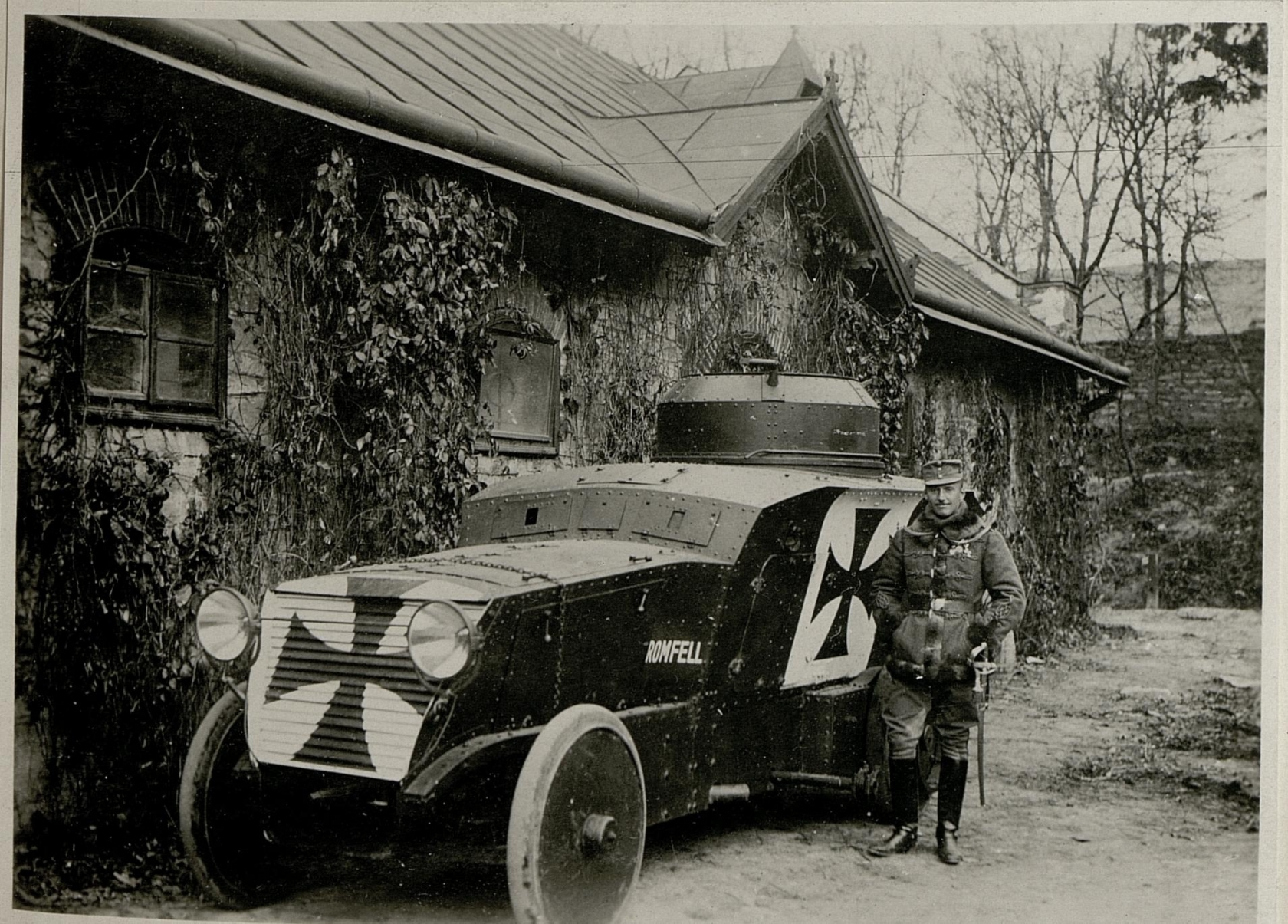

Service history
- Used by: Austro-Hungarian Army
- Wars: World War I Austro-Slovene conflict in Carinthia

Production history
- Designer: Branko Romanić & Simon Fellner
- Designed: 1915
- No. built: 1 or 2

Specifications
- Mass: 5 tons (Mercedes chassis), 3.51 (Fiat chassis)
- Length: 5.67 m (Mercedes chassis), 5.37 m (Fiat chassis)
- Width: 1.8 m (Mercedes)
- Height: 2.48 m (Mercedes)
- Crew: 4 (Commander, driver, gunner, assistant)
- Armor: 2-7 mm
- Main armament: 8 mm Schwarzlose machine gun
- Secondary armament: 1 x 8 mm Mannlicher M1895 rifle, 2 x 9 mm Steyr M1912 pistols
- Engine: Mercedes 4-stroke Otto, 4-cylinder (Mercedes), M09 Goliath water-cooled petrol engine (Fiat); 90-95 hp (Mercedes), 44 hp (Fiat)
- Drive: rear-wheel
- Transmission: 4-speed manual
- Ground clearance: .36 m (Mercedes)
- Operational range: 100-150 km (Mercedes)
- Maximum speed: 28-40 km/h on-road, 25 km/h off-road (Mercedes), 35 km/h (Fiat)
- References: https://tanks-encyclopedia.com/ww1/austria-hungary/romfell-armoured-car

The Romfell armoured car was designed by Hauptmann Branko Romanić and Oberleutnant Simon Fellner (hence the name Romfell) for the Austro-Hungarian Army in 1915, based on a Mercedes 37/90 PS chassis. Romanić and Fellner were supported by Lieutenant Emil Vidéky, Imre Kádár, and Lieutenants Ágoston and Fazekas. A private enterprise, the War Ministry was not informed of the car's construction until a Siemens and Halske radio was requested, at which point they became aware of the project and viewed it with disapproval. A favorable report was given by Oberleutnant Erich Kurzel Edler von Runtscheiner so construction proceeded, with the car being finished by the end of July, 1915 at the Automotive Replacement Depot in Budapest.

The Romfell was armed with a Schwarzlose M07/12 HMG in a 1,100mm 360 degree rotating turret. The machine gun could be elevated 45° and depressed 30°. Additional firepower was carried by the crew in the form of a Steyr M.95 rifle and two Steyr 1912 pistols. Armor consisted of metal plates riveted to the frame: 2-2.5 mm for the roof, 6.5-7mm for the sides and vertical areas of the turret, and 4.5-5mm elsewhere. Crew entry and exit was from small hatches on the side. Three shooting ports were on the left side and two on the right, with a hatch in front for the driver to see through as well as a small hatch for the commander/observer and a central square hatch from which a Zeiss acetylene searchlight could be mounted. The searchlight could also be mounted on the roof. The radiator was protected by an armored shutter. At the rear were two extrusions. The top extrusion was used for a tow hook, to which a short-lived ammo trailer could be attached. The lower extrusion could be dropped to the ground via a chain, acting as an anchor if stalled on a slope.

== Operational history ==
The first test drive of the Romfell took place on 30, July 1915 for 100 km. In the fall it took part in a military parade in Budapest. After impressing parade attendees and being inspected by the War Ministry it was accepted into service where it was issued to the 7th Army on 11 October 1915 and attached to the 36th Infantry Troops Division of the XIII Corps. No specific action was noted during October, but it was found that the trailer impeded mobility while offering limited carrying capability so it was discarded in favor of a truck carrying spare parts, tires, fuel, and ammunition. The Romfell saw action during the Brusilov Offensive, but by this point it was badly worn so was sent back for repairs/rebuilding on 11 August 1916 at the Kraftwagenwerkstätte Nr.36 des Etappengruppenkommandos 9 (Car Workshop No.36 of Support Command No.9) in Stryi Stryi, where it received the registration KN 5965. The car was next seen again on 18 June 1917 with the 5th Army in Ljubljana, where it was decided to replace the Mercedes chassis with that of captured Italian Fiat 18 BL truck chassis at Feldautopark Nr.1. Some sources state that this was actually a second car and not the original.

The Fiat chassis shortened the total length to 5.37 m and the weight was reduced to 3.51 tons. The 44 hp Fiat M09 Goliath engine was retained. Even though the Fiat featured lower horse power than the Mercedes engine, the change in weight from the chassis and running gear allowed the Romfell to reach 35 km/h. On 1 June 1918 the Romfell was sent to be part of the military carry supply unit in Udine with other armored cars as part of K.u.K. Panzerautozug No.1. This unit consisted of two Junovicz P.A.1, a captured Lancia 1ZM, a captured Austin Armoured Car and a captured Isotta-Fraschini. This unit saw little to no action during the war.

After the Armistice of Villa Giusti was signed in 1918, Zugsführer Johann Amann, along with Zugsführer Schoderböck, Zugsführer Deutschmann, and Gefreiter Petschnig, retreated to Carinthia with the Romfell and the captured Austin armored car in order to fight against Yugoslavian troops. They were joined by 8 men, with command of the Romfell being given to Fähnrig Jack. Zgf. Schoderböck and with Zgf. Großl in command of the Austin. One of these cars saw action during the attack on Völkermarkt, and both cars defended Austrian troops near Grafenstein on 15 December 1918. On 29 April 1919 the ceasefire was broken and the armored cars, along with the 2nd Volkswehr Battalion and other units, advanced from Klagenfurt am Wörthersee to the Gurk (river), after which they cleared the road around Haidach and proceeded to advance first to Poggersdorf and then (without infantry support) to Kreuzerhof, where the Austin was damaged by hand grenades. On 30 April 1919 the Romfell supported the 2nd Volkswehr Battalion in their advance towards Völkermarkt and took part in the attack of the city on 2 May 1919. On 4 May 1919 it was deployed near Sankt Margareten and Abtei and saw action near Eisenkappel. The last reported action of the Romfell was on 6 May 1919, where it was tasked with supplying a machine gun unit on the front line of the fighting. It is unknown what happened to the vehicle after that.
