= Ducceschi =

Ducceschi is an Italian surname. Notable people with the surname include:

- Manrico Ducceschi (1920–1948), Italian partisan
- Raffaello Ducceschi (born 1962), Italian race walker
