= Ermanno Carlotto (Lieutenant) =

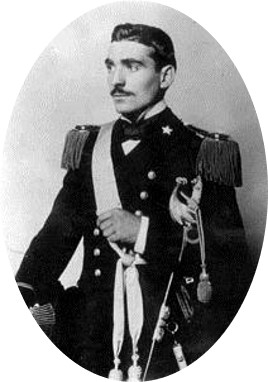
- An image of Ermanno Carlotto in his uniform
- Born: 30 November 1878; Ceva
- Died: 27 June 1900 (aged 21); Tianjin
- Cause of death: Died in combat
- Military career
- Allegiance: Kingdom of Italy
- Service years: 1898–1900
- Rank: Lieutenant
- Unit: Fucilieri di Marina
- Known for: His sacrifice whilst protecting the military school of Tianjin from an attack by the Boxer Movement
- Conflicts: Boxer Rebellion
- Awards: Gold Medal of Military Valor

Ermanno Carlotto (Ceva, 30 November 1878 – Tianjin, 27 June 1900) was an Italian soldier who was awarded a Gold Medal of Military Valor by the Kingdom of Italy due to his actions during the Boxer Rebellion, which made him an Italian war hero.

== Childhood ==
He was born on 30 November 1878, in Ceva, and his parents were Giuseppe Carlotto and Angiolina Barelli.

== Career ==
In November 1892, at 14 years old, he was admitted to the Italian Naval Academy of Livorno , and after years of experience upon exiting, he gained the Gardes de la Marine in 1898. Soon after, he was enlisted to sail on the armored cruiser Carlo Alberto, which was en route to the Americas and East Asia. In 1900, he was promoted to Lieutenant , and he was ordered to sail the Italian cruiser Elba, which at the time was active in Chinese waters.

== Death ==
Meanwhile, in China, the Boxer Rebellion had begun, and Lieutenant Carlotto, in charge of a detachment of 20 marines, took part in the defense of Tientsin (now known as Tianjin). On 19 June 1900, he was seriously injured during a gruesome assault by the Boxers against the military school in Tianjin, which he was defending alongside his men. The marines alongside him, seeing that their commander was shot down, led by rage, pushed the enemy away from the military school, scoring a military victory.

On the night of 26 June he was hit by severe fever and he fell into delirium the whole night. He would die 8 days later in an English hospital in Tianjin. He would receive a Gold Medal of Military Valor for his sacrifice. His death was one of the reasons why the Italian Parliament decided on 5 July to send an army of 2000 soldiers to crush the Boxer Rebellion.

== Legacy ==
The Italian Navy created the Regimento Carlotto (a marine unit), the Ermanno Carlotto gunboat (1921),0 and some military structures such as the Carlotto barrack in Brindisi and the Ermanno Carlotto barrack in the Italian concession of Tianjin.

== Medals ==
Gold Medal of Military Valor - ribbon for ordinary uniform

Gold Medal of Military Valor
"Facing any kind of danger, he exposed himself in every circumstance and fell bravely while advancing undefended to discover the points where to direct the fire of his detachment..."
— Tianjin
— 19 June 1900

== See also ==
- Caserma Ermanno Carlotto
