= Italian destroyer Carabiniere (1938) =

Destroyer of the Regia Marina

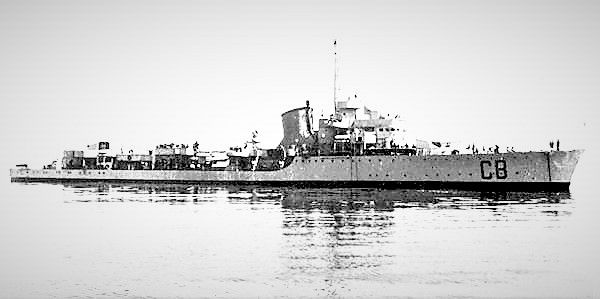

History

Italy
- Name: Carabiniere
- Namesake: Carabinieri
- Builder: Cantiere navale di Riva Trigoso
- Laid down: 1 February 1937
- Launched: 23 July 1938
- Completed: 20 December 1938
- Stricken: 18 January 1956
- Fate: Scrapped, 1978

General characteristics (as built)
- Class & type: Soldati-class destroyer
- Displacement: 1,820–1,850 long tons (1,850–1,880 t) (standard); 2,450–2,550 long tons (2,490–2,590 t) (full load)
- Length: 106.7 m (350 ft 1 in) (o/a); 101.6 m (333 ft 4 in) (p/p)
- Beam: 10.15 m (33 ft 4 in)
- Draught: 3.15–4.3 m (10 ft 4 in – 14 ft 1 in)
- Installed power: 3 Yarrow boilers; 48,000 shp (36,000 kW)
- Propulsion: 2 shafts; 2 geared steam turbines
- Speed: 34–35 knots (63–65 km/h; 39–40 mph)
- Range: 2,340 nmi (4,330 km; 2,690 mi) at 14 knots (26 km/h; 16 mph)
- Complement: 206
- Armament: 2 × twin 120 mm (4.7 in) guns; 8 × 20 mm (0.8 in) AA guns; 2 × triple 533 mm (21 in) torpedo tubes; 2 × depth charge throwers; 48 mines

Carabiniere was one of nineteen Soldati-class destroyers built for the Regia Marina (Royal Italian Navy) in the late 1930s and early 1940s. Completed in 1938, she survived World War II to be scrapped in 1978.

== Design and description ==
The Soldati-class destroyers were slightly improved versions of the preceding Oriani class. They had a length between perpendiculars of 101.6 meters (333 ft 4 in) and an overall length of 106.7 meters (350 ft 1 in). The ships had a beam of 10.15 meters (33 ft 4 in) and a mean draft of 3.15 meters (10 ft 4 in) and 4.3 meters (14 ft 1 in) at deep load. The Soldatis displaced 1,830–1,850 metric tons (1,800–1,820 long tons) at normal load, and 2,450–2,550 metric tons (2,410–2,510 long tons) at deep load. Their wartime complement during was 206 officers and enlisted men.

Carabiniere was powered by two Belluzzo geared steam turbines, each driving one propeller shaft using steam supplied by three Yarrow boilers. Designed for a maximum output of 48,000 shaft horsepower (36,000 kW) and a speed of 34–35 knots (63–65 km/h; 39–40 mph) in service, the Soldati-class ships reached speeds of 39–40 knots (72–74 km/h; 45–46 mph) during their sea trials while lightly loaded. They carried enough fuel oil to give them a range of 2,340 nautical miles (4,330 km; 2,690 mi) at a speed of 14 knots (26 km/h; 16 mph) and 682 nmi (1,263 km; 785 mi) at a speed of 34 knots (63 km/h; 39 mph).

Carabiniere's main battery consisted of four 50-caliber 120-millimeter (4.7 in) guns in two twin-gun turrets, one each fore and aft of the superstructure. Anti-aircraft (AA) defense for the Soldatis was provided by eight 20-millimeter (0.8 in) Breda Model 1935 guns. The ships were equipped with six 533-millimeter (21 in) torpedo tubes in two triple mounts amidships. Although they were not provided with a sonar system for anti-submarine work, they were fitted with a pair of depth charge throwers. The ships could carry 48 mines.

== Combat against Japan ==
As early as of May 1945, the Carabiniere had been prepared and refitted with a new radar and camouflage scheme to operate in the Indian and Pacific Ocean against the Japanese Empire, in collaboration with the Allies, as the 14 July 1945 declaration of war by Italy on Japan was impending. Departing under the command of captain Fabio Tani, after a troublesome voyage the Italian crew reached their new base in Trincomalee, Ceylon. By August 1945, the Carabiniere had undertaken 38 missions of anti-aircraft and anti-submarine escort to British warships and SAR operations. The Italians thoroughly impressed Admiral Arthur Power of the Eastern Fleet during combat and in defending the fleet against kamikaze attacks, and before the Carabiniere was due to return to Italy, he offered captain Tani a golden watch with 38 rubies, one for each mission, as a prize for their valour. Captain Tani kindly declined and requested that 38 Italian POWs still held in English prison camps in Ceylon be released instead, one for each ruby. The Admiral granted the request, and the Carabiniere returned home with the freed prisoners.

== Post-war period ==
At war's end and having returned to Italy with the 38 freed Italian POWs, the Carabiniere continued to serve the Italian Navy and underwent several upgrades and refits throughout the years. By 1978, the 40-year-old decommissioned ship was being used as a training platform by the elite Incursori special operations units of the Italian navy, but being in a precarious structural condition, it was decided to sell her for scrap. She partially sank close to La Spezia in March due to adverse weather conditions while being towed to her demolition site. The wreck was eventually raised and demolished in La Spezia.

== Bibliography ==
- Brescia, Maurizio (2012). Mussolini's Navy: A Reference Guide to the Regina Marina 1930–45. Annapolis, Maryland: Naval Institute Press. ISBN 978-1-59114-544-8.
- Fraccaroli, Aldo (1968). Italian Warships of World War II. Shepperton, UK: Ian Allan. ISBN 0-7110-0002-6.
- Roberts, John (1980). "Italy". In Chesneau, Roger (ed.). Conway's All the World's Fighting Ships 1922–1946. New York: Mayflower Books. pp. 280–317. ISBN 0-8317-0303-2.
- Rohwer, Jürgen (2005). Chronology of the War at Sea 1939–1945: The Naval History of World War Two (Third Revised ed.). Annapolis, Maryland: Naval Institute Press. ISBN 1-59114-119-2.
- Smigielski, Adam (1995). "Italy". In Chumbley, Stephen (ed.). Conway's All the World's Fighting Ships 1947-1995. Annapolis, Maryland: Naval Institute Press. pp. 195–218. ISBN 1-55750-132-7.
- Whitley, M. J. (1988). Destroyers of World War 2: An International Encyclopedia. Annapolis, Maryland: Naval Institute Press. ISBN 1-85409-521-8.
