= World Heritage Convention =

1972 international treaty

Convention Concerning the Protection of the World Cultural and Natural Heritage
- English text of the treaty
- Signed: 16–23 November 1972
- Location: Paris, France
- Effective: 17 December 1975
- Condition: 20 ratifications
- Ratifiers: 196 (192 UN member states plus the Cook Islands, the Holy See (Vatican City), Niue, and Palestine)
- Depositary: Director-General of the United Nations Educational, Scientific and Cultural Organization
- Languages: Arabic, Chinese, English, French, Hebrew, Portuguese, Russian, and Spanish

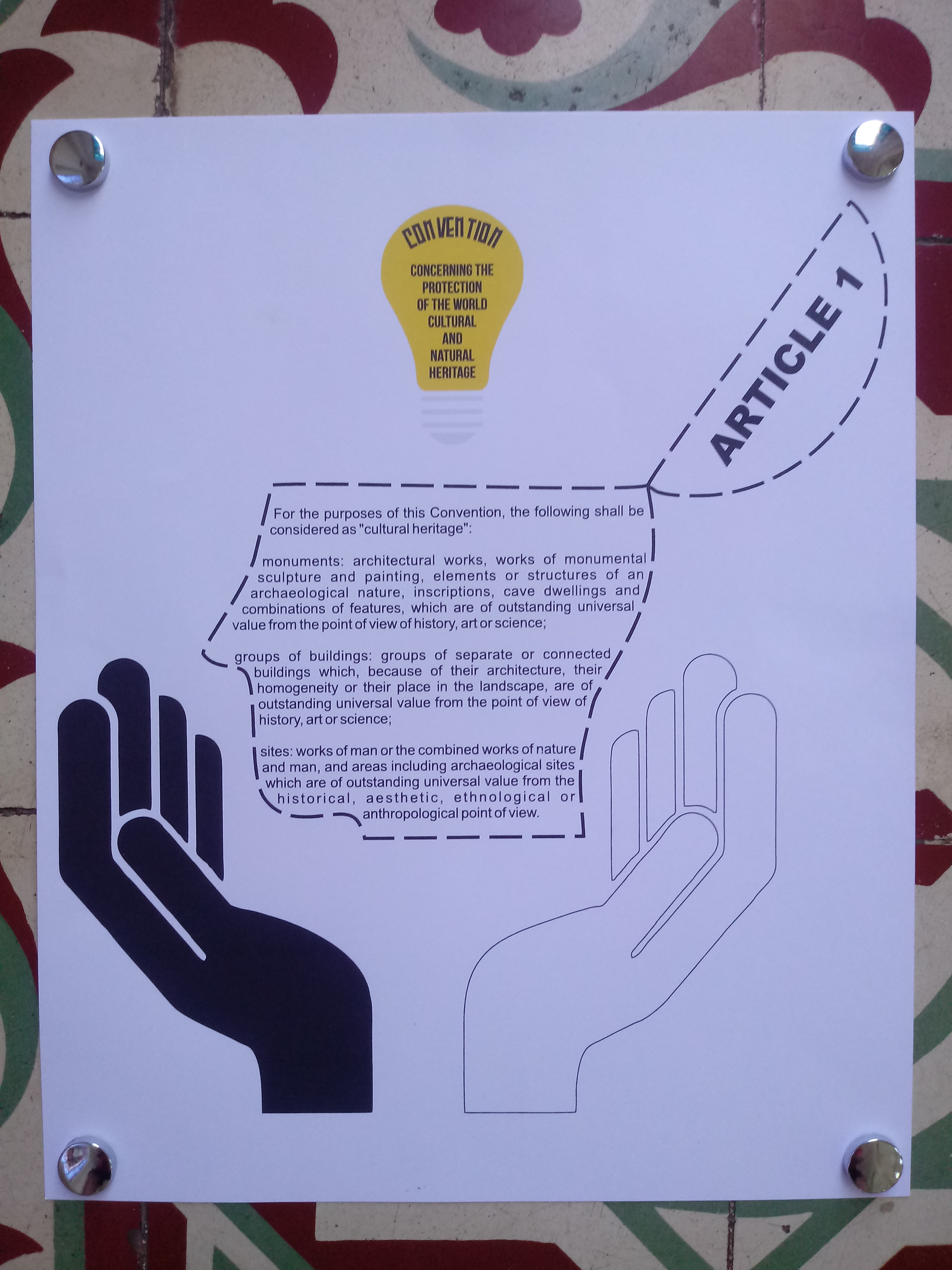
Article 1 on plaque.

The World Heritage Convention, formally the Convention Concerning the Protection of the World Cultural and Natural Heritage, is an international treaty signed on 23 November 1972, which created the World Heritage Sites, with the primary goals of nature conservation and the preservation and security of cultural properties. The convention, a signed document of international agreement, guides the work of the World Heritage Committee. It was developed over a seven-year period (1965–1972).

The convention defines which sites can be considered for inscription on the World Heritage Sites list, sets out the duties of each country's governments to identify potential sites and to protect and preserve them. Signatory countries pledge to conserve their World Heritage Sites, report regularly on the state of their conservation and if needed, to restore the sites. The convention also sets out how the World Heritage Fund is to be used and managed.

It was adopted by the General Conference of UNESCO on 16 November 1972, and signed by the President of General Conference of UNESCO, Toru Hagiwara, and the Director-General of UNESCO, René Maheu, on 23 November 1972. It is held in the archives of UNESCO.

== Development ==
The International Campaign to Save the Monuments of Nubia, which began after appeals by Egypt and Sudan in 1959, led to the relocation of 22 monuments. The success of the project, in particular the creation of a coalition of 50 countries behind the project, led UNESCO, together with the International Council on Monuments and Sites (ICOMOS), to prepare a draft convention on the protection of cultural heritage.

A White House conference in 1965 called for a "World Heritage Trust" to preserve "the world's superb natural and scenic areas and historic sites for the present and the future of the entire world citizenry". The International Union for Conservation of Nature developed similar proposals in 1968, which were presented in 1972 to the United Nations Conference on the Human Environment in Stockholm. Under the World Heritage Committee, signatory countries are required to produce and submit periodic data reporting providing the committee with an overview of each participating nation's implementation of the World Heritage Convention and a 'snapshot' of current conditions at World Heritage properties.

== Adoption and implementation ==
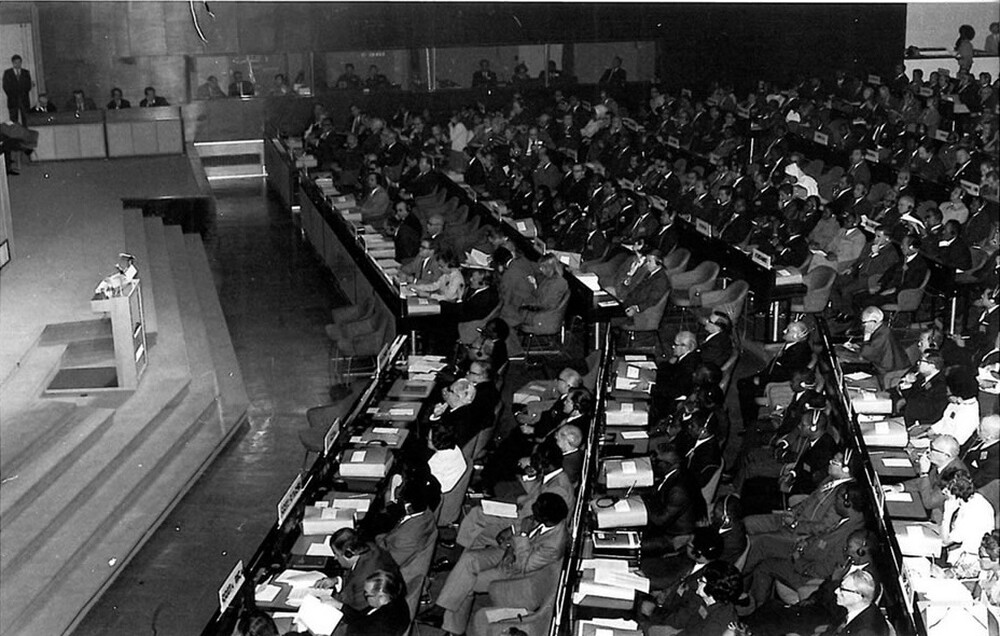
Adoption of the World Heritage Convention in 1972 at UNESCO.

Based on the draft convention that UNESCO had initiated, a single text was eventually agreed upon by all parties, and the "Convention Concerning the Protection of the World Cultural and Natural Heritage" was adopted by the General Conference of UNESCO on 16 November 1972. The convention came into force on 17 December 1975, three months after the 20th ratification.

The convention began to be implemented in 1977, after the 40th ratification, and the first names were inscribed to the list in 1978. New names have been added to the list every year since then, at the annual sessions of the World Heritage Committee.

== Contents ==
The convention contains 38 articles. The key articles are set out below:

Article 1: Definition of cultural heritage
- For the purposes of this Convention, the following shall be considered as "cultural heritage":
- monuments: architectural works, works of monumental sculpture and painting, elements or structures of an archaeological nature, inscriptions, cave dwellings and combinations of features, which are of outstanding universal value from the point of view of history, art or science;
- groups of buildings: groups of separate or connected buildings which, because of their architecture, their homogeneity or their place in the landscape, are of outstanding universal value from the point of view of history, art or science;
- sites: works of man or the combined works of nature and man, and areas including archaeological sites which are of outstanding universal value from the historical, aesthetic, ethnological or anthropological point of view.
Article 2: Definition of natural heritage
- For the purposes of this Convention, the following shall be considered as "natural heritage":
- natural features consisting of physical and biological formations or groups of such formations, which are of outstanding universal value from the aesthetic or scientific point of view;
- geological and physiographical formations and precisely delineated areas which constitute the habitat of threatened species of animals and plants of outstanding universal value from the point of view of science or conservation;
- natural sites or precisely delineated natural areas of outstanding universal value from the point of view of science, conservation or natural beauty.
Article 4: Duties of governments
- Each State Party to this Convention recognizes that the duty of ensuring the identification, protection, conservation, presentation and transmission to future generations of the cultural and natural heritage referred to in Articles 1 and 2 and situated on its territory, belongs primarily to that State. It will do all it can to this end, to the utmost of its own resources and, where appropriate, with any international assistance and co-operation, in particular, financial, artistic, scientific and technical, which it may be able to obtain.
Article 8: World Heritage Committee
- An Intergovernmental Committee for the Protection of the Cultural and Natural Heritage of Outstanding Universal Value, called "the World Heritage Committee", is hereby established within the United Nations Educational, Scientific and Cultural Organization. It shall be composed of 15 States Parties to the Convention, elected by States Parties to the Convention meeting in general assembly during the ordinary session of the General Conference of the United Nations Educational, Scientific and Cultural Organization. The number of States members of the Committee shall be increased to 21 as from the date of the ordinary session of the General Conference following the entry into force of this Convention for at least 40 States. Election of members of the Committee shall ensure an equitable representation of the different regions and cultures of the world. A representative of the International Centre for the Study of the Preservation and Restoration of Cultural Property (ICCROM), a representative of the International Council of Monuments and Sites (ICOMOS) and a representative of the International Union for Conservation of Nature and Natural Resources (IUCN), to whom may be added, at the request of States Parties to the Convention meeting in general assembly during the ordinary sessions of the General Conference of the United Nations Educational, Scientific and Cultural Organization, representatives of other intergovernmental or non-governmental organizations, with similar objectives, may attend the meetings of the Committee in an advisory capacity.
Article 15: Fund
- A Fund for the Protection of the World Cultural and Natural Heritage of Outstanding Universal Value, called "the World Heritage Fund", is hereby established. The Fund shall constitute a trust fund, in conformity with the provisions of the Financial Regulations of the United Nations Educational, Scientific and Cultural Organization. The resources of the Fund shall consist of: compulsory and voluntary contributions made by States Parties to this Convention, contributions, gifts or bequests which may be made by: other States; the United Nations Educational, Scientific and Cultural Organization, other organizations of the United Nations system, particularly the United Nations Development Programme or other intergovernmental organizations;public or private bodies or individuals; any interest due on the resources of the Fund; funds raised by collections and receipts from events organized for the benefit of the fund; and all other resources authorized by the Fund's regulations, as drawn up by the World Heritage Committee. Contributions to the Fund and other forms of assistance made available to the Committee may be used only for such purposes as the Committee shall define. The Committee may accept contributions to be used only for a certain programme or project, provided that the Committee shall have decided on the implementation of such programme or project. No political conditions may be attached to contributions made to the Fund.
Article 19: Requests for assistance
- Any State Party to this Convention may request international assistance for property forming part of the cultural or natural heritage of outstanding universal value situated within its territory. It shall submit with its request such information and documentation provided for in Article 21 as it has in its possession and as will enable the Committee to come to a decision.
Article 22: Forms of assistance
- Assistance granted by the World Heritage Committee may take the following forms:
- studies concerning the artistic, scientific and technical problems raised by the protection, conservation, presentation and rehabilitation of the cultural and natural heritage, as defined in paragraphs 2 and 4 of Article 11of this Convention;
- provisions of experts, technicians and skilled labour to ensure that the approved work is correctly carried out; training of staff and specialists at all levels in the field of identification, protection, conservation, presentation and rehabilitation of the cultural and natural heritage;
- supply of equipment which the State concerned does not possess or is not in a position to acquire;
- low-interest or interest-free loans which might be repayable on a long-term basis;
- the granting, in exceptional cases and for special reasons, of non-repayable subsidies.
Article 25: Sharing of Costs
- As a general rule, only part of the cost of work necessary shall be borne by the international community. The contribution of the State benefiting from international assistance shall constitute a substantial share of the resources devoted to each programme or project, unless its resources do not permit this.
Article 29: Reporting duties
- The States Parties to this Convention shall, in the reports which they submit to the General Conference of the United Nations Educational, Scientific and Cultural Organization on dates and in a manner to be determined by it, give information on the legislative and administrative provisions which they have adopted and other action which they have taken for the application of this Convention, together with details of the experience acquired in this field. These reports shall be brought to the attention of the World Heritage Committee. The Committee shall submit a report on its activities at each of the ordinary sessions of the General Conference of the United Nations Educational, Scientific and Cultural Organization.

== Ratification ==
As of August 2024, the convention has been ratified by 196 states: 192 UN member states, two UN observer states (the Holy See (Vatican City) and Palestine), and two states in free association with New Zealand (the Cook Islands and Niue). Only one UN member state has not ratified the convention: Liechtenstein.

== Bibliography ==
- Centre, UNESCO World Heritage (16 November 1972). "Convention Concerning the Protection of the World Cultural and Natural Heritage". UNESCO World Heritage Centre.
- Cave, C.; Negussie, E. (2017). World Heritage Conservation: The World Heritage Convention, Linking Culture and Nature for Sustainable Development. Taylor & Francis. ISBN 978-1-317-91627-7.
- Meskell, Lynn. "States of Conservation: Protection, Politics, and Pacting within UNESCO's World Heritage Committee". Anthropological Quarterly, vol. 87, no. 1, 2014, pp. 217–43. JSTOR, http://www.jstor.org/stable/43652726. Accessed 12 October 2022.

== See also ==
- International Day For Monuments and Sites
