= Ceva =

- Comune
- Città di Ceva
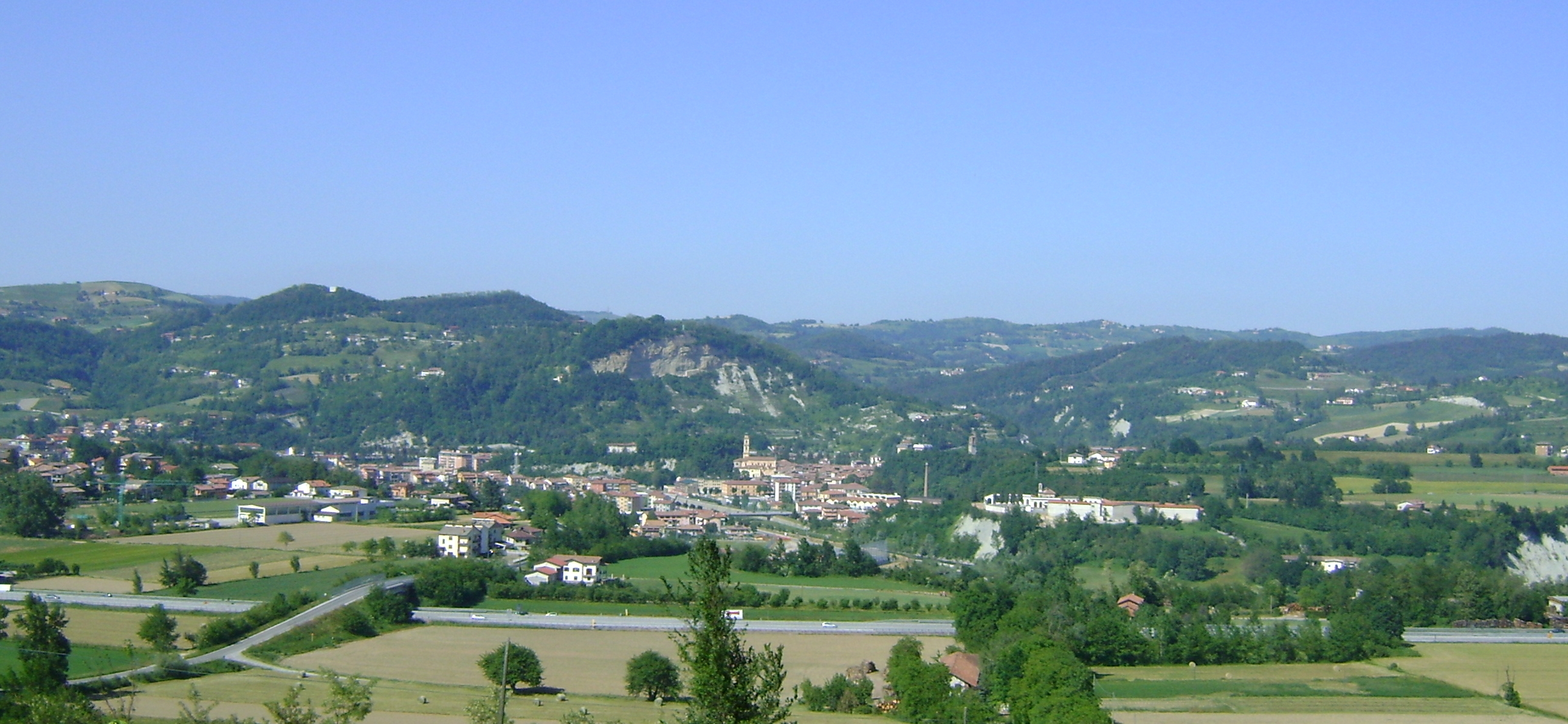

- Location within Italy Location within Piedmont
- Coordinates: 44°23′N 08°02′E
- Country: Italy
- Region: Piedmont
- Province: Cuneo (CN)
- Frazioni: Bertini, Infermiera, Malpotremo, Mollere, Poggi San Siro, Poggi Santo Spirito, Pratolungo.

Government
  - Mayor: Fabio Mottinelli (Lista Civica)

Area
  - Total: 42 km^{2} (16 sq mi)
- Elevation: 385 m (1,263 ft)

Population (January 1, 2019)
  - Total: 5,697
  - Density: 140/km^{2} (350/sq mi)
- Demonym: Cebani
- Time zone: UTC+1 (CET)
  - Summer (DST): UTC+2 (CEST)
- Postal code: 12073
- Dialing code: 0174
- Patron saint: Madonna del Rosario, Santa Lucia
- Website: Official website

Ceva, the ancient Ceba, is a small Italian town in the province of Cuneo, region of Piedmont, 49 kilometres (30 mi) east of Cuneo. It lies on the right bank of the Tanaro on a wedge of land between that river and the Cevetta stream.

== History ==
In the pre-Roman period the territory around Ceva was inhabited by the branch of the mountain Ligures known as Epanterii.

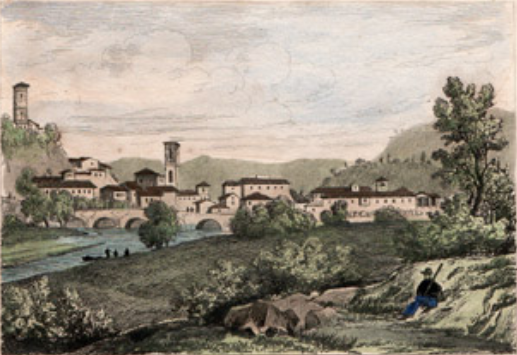
Ceva in 1835

The upper Val Tanaro was Romanized in the second century BC and it is known that the area was organized around a municipium. However, it is not certain that this was Ceba: Mombasiglio is also regarded as a candidate. In the first century AD Columella referred to a particular breed of cattle raised here, and Pliny the Elder praised its sheep's milk cheese in his Natural History. The town is on the site of the old Roman road from Augusta Taurinorum via Pollentia to the coast and it is probable that there was a market here from which the cheese produced in the region was exported to Rome via the Ligurian ports of Vada Sabatia (the modern Vado Ligure) and/or Albingaunum (Albenga).

In the Middle Ages it was the seat of a small marquisate, which lasted until the late 15th century when it was acquired by Savoy. Ceva was home to a fortress defending the confines of Piedmont towards Liguria, but the fortifications on the rock above the town were demolished in 1800 by the French, to whom it had been ceded in 1796.

Ceva was heavily damaged by a flood of the Tanaro, Cevetta and Bovina rivers.

== Napoleonic Era ==
During the beginning of Napoleon Bonaparte's military career in the Italian Campaign, he captured and used Ceva as a point to outflank the Piedmontese garrison at Cuni in April of 1796. Napoleon's presence in Ceva also threatened Turin greatly, allowing Napoleon to use Ceva as another launch point for an invasion of Turin.

== Main sights ==
The 16th-century castle of the Pallavicino stands in an area of green parkland between the Tanaro and the Cevetta and comprises two small palaces: the original, red palazzina rossa and the later, white palazzina bianca. Remains of the 16th-century fort are also present.

The Duomo of Ceva, also known as the Collegiata dell'Assunzione della Beata Vergine Maria, was completed in 1605.

== Twin towns ==
Ceva is twinned with:

- Le Val, France (1992)

== Notable people ==
- Ermanno Carlotto

== See also ==
- Marquisate of Ceva
- Ceva Grimaldi family
- Aloysius Bertrand
