= Naitō Konan =

Japanese historian and sinologist (1866–1934)

Naitō Torajirō
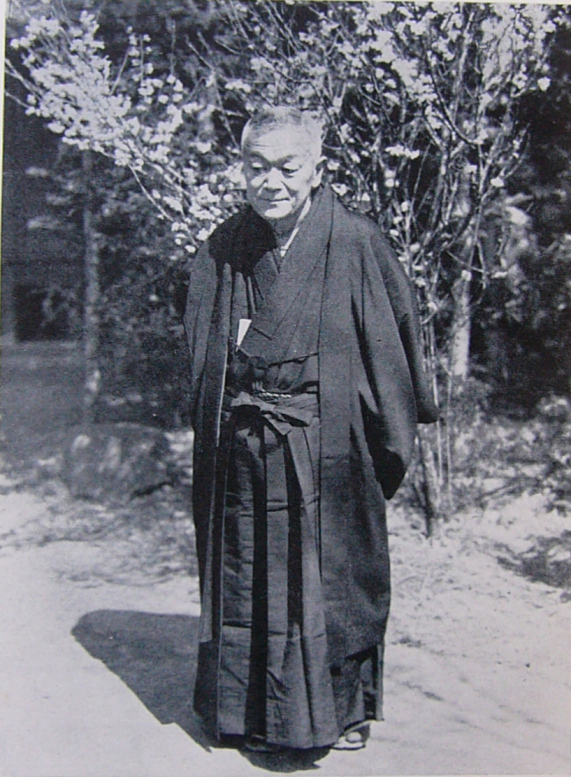
- Naitō Torajirō at his home, April 9, 1934
- Born: August 27, 1866; Kemanai, Akita, Japan
- Died: June 26, 1934 (aged 67); Kamo, Kyoto, Japan
- Resting place: Kyoto
- Other name: Naitō Konan (内藤 湖南)

Naitō Torajirō (Japanese: 内藤 虎次郎; Kemanai August 27, 1866 – June 26, 1934), commonly known as Naitō Konan (内藤 湖南), was a Japanese historian and Sinologist. He was the founder of the Kyoto School of historiography, and along with Shiratori Kurakichi (the founder of the Tokyo School), was one of the leading Japanese historians of East Asia in the early twentieth century. His best-known book is called Nara.

== Biography ==
He was born in Kemanai, what is today Akita Prefecture. He distinguished himself as a journalist. In 1907 he discovered Manwen Laodang in Mukden. As an authority of Chinese history, he was invited to Kyoto Imperial University by Kano Kokichi in 1907 and got involved in the foundation of the Department of Oriental History.

Naitō's most influential contribution to historiography was the recognition and analysis of the "Tang-Song transition" as an important watershed. He argued that the social, political, demographic and economic changes that occurred between the mid-Tang dynasty and early Song dynasty represented the transition between the medieval (中世, chūsei) and early modern (近世, kinsei) periods of Chinese history.

In Japanese history, Naitō argued that Yamataikoku was located in Kyūshū rather than in Kinki.
