= Ferruccio Stefenelli =

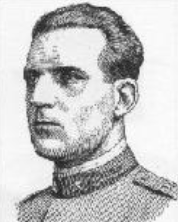
- Drawing of Stefenelli Ferruccio

10th Podestà of Italian concession of Tianjin
- In office 1938–1943
- Preceded by: Filippo Zappi
- Succeeded by: Position abolished

Personal details
- Born: 9 July 1898 Trento, Austro-Hungary
- Died: 11 May 1980 (aged 81) Mezzolombardo, Republic of Italy
- Party: National Fascist Party (up until 1943)
- Profession: Diplomat, militant

Military service
- Allegiance: Kingdom of Italy (1917–1943); Italian Social Republic (1943–1945); Kingdom of Italy (1945–1946); Republic of Italy (1946–onwards)
- Ambassador from French Tunisia; Republic of China; Wang Jingwei regime Belgian Congo; State of Vietnam; Republic of Ghana

Ferruccio Stefenelli (Trento, 9 July 1898 – Mezzolombardo, 11 May 1980) was a soldier and Italian diplomat, who was awarded a Gold Medal of Military Valor, Silver Medal of Military Valor, Bronze Medal of Military Valor and the War Merit Cross during the First World War.

== Biography ==
On 9 July 1898, he was born in Trento, which at the time was part of the Austro-Hungarian Empire. His father, named Giuseppe, was an Italian irredentist and director of the liberal newspaper "Alto Adige" (active from the year 1906 to 1914), whilst his mother, Maria Ranzi, was the cousin of Guglielmo Ranzi, the inventor of the Monument to Dante (Trento). His older brother was also called Giuseppe after his father.

He had 4 younger siblings, Rachele Stefenelli (1899–1981), Giuseppe Stefenelli (1900–1984), Pietro Stefenelli (1909–1983) and Manlio Stefenelli (1910–1986).

As soon as he started middle school, to avoid repression from the Austro-Hungarian police, he left his hometown alongside his family, transferring to the Kingdom of Italy, where his father was employed as a civic affairs official in the command of the Regio Esercito in Florence.

He would marry at a young age with poetry writer Noemi degli Alessandrini Stefenelli (1905–1970).

During World War I, Ferruccio enlisted voluntarily in the army, and after having studied in the Military Academy of Modena, he was assigned to the battalion "Moncenisio" of the 3rd Alpini regiment on the frontline, being assigned the war name "Giuseppe Gennari". He was enlisted despite the prohibition given by the Ministry of War to Italian irredentists after the historic sacrifice of Cesare Battisti. During the assault on Ortigara on 19 June 1917, Ferruccio was injured and subsequently awarded the Silver Medal of Military Valor. He was sent to a military hospital for two months before being sent to the frontlines once again to fight on Mount Tomba, where on 28 November 1917, he was also be awarded the Bronze Medal of Military Valor. A few days later, on 16 December 1917, during a battle in Col Caprile he was once again injured and even captured as a POW.

He was healed up by the military hospital of Primolano, Pergine Valsugana, and Trento, and was transferred to the internment camp of Veľký Meder, in the lands of the Crown of Saint Stephen , and he was later liberated at the end of the conflict. During the entirety of his detention, he was able to hide his own identity. If his identity had been discovered by the Austro-Hungarian authorities, due to being an irredentist, he'd likely have faced the death penalty by hanging.

After the end of World War I, he became one of the four soldiers (an alpino, him, a sailor, a pilot, and an infantryman) who were allowed to carry on his shoulder the coffin of the unknown soldier up to the Victor Emanuel II monument in Rome. In 1920, in the now Italian Trento, he created and took charge of the local section of the National Alpini Association , and after 18 July of the same year, he would create the section, he would become its first Vice-president and secretary.

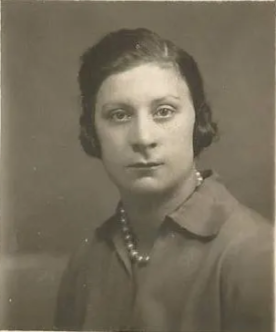
Noemi degli Alessandrini Stefenelli at age 23, Italian poet and wife of Ferruccio Stefenelli

He would continue to work in the military up until 1927, when, upon using the law which permitted war heroes to pursue any consular job to war heroes, he began his diplomatic career, which would lead him to have important roles in Africa, Oceania, and Asia as vice-consul, consul, general consul, and ambassador of Italy.

After being decreed as eligible for his new career in November 1927, in 1929 he was assigned as a Vice Consul in Sfax, French Tunisia up until 1932.

His longest tenure begun in 1933, when he was assigned to represent Italy in the Republic of China, being stationed in Hankou, where, in his early years, he'd meet Mao Zedong and Zhou Enlai.

During his tenure in China, he was a strong believer of Italian neutrality during his diplomatic career, up until the Italian entry into World War II. He also considered himself neutral on the Second Sino-Japanese War. During this time, his daughter, Maria Grazia Stefenelli, became a friend of the son of Zhang Zuolin, whom she had nicknamed "Bobby". His daughter also went to school and interacted with Mark di Suvero, so much so that Ferruccio Stefenelli utilized his diplomatic powers and lent his car to Mark's parents as to help them escape to San Francisco in 1941.

He was the last fascist podestà of the Italian concession of Tientsin in China from 1938 up until the Japanese-Italian War on 10 September 1943. During the assault on the concession, he hid in the Caserma Ermanno Carlotto alongside the Italian and Chinese civilians within the colony. Upon being arrested, he was one of the 170 Italians who swore loyalty to the Italian Social Republic, sparing him from being sent to an internment camp.

He did to guarantee that the remaining non-interned Italian civilians would be protected by some kind of diplomatic and consular protection after ambassador Francesco Maria Taliani's arrest on 8 September 1943. In October 1943 he sent a telegram from Nanjing to the Italian Embassy in Berlin complaining that "despite" the Italians' "declarations of loyalty to the Fascist Government, Japanese and Chinese authorities have taken drastic and humiliating measures against Italian institutions and citizens". He then complained about the embassy's funds being seized and asked the Italian Social Republic to intervene to reinstate Fascist Consuls as to protect Italian civilians. He was the only person during the Japanese-Italian War to represent the Italians in occupied China, Korea and Japan effectively.

After that, he continued his diplomatic role under Japanese supervision, visiting an internment camp located in the proximity of a Catholic monastery in Tokyo's outskirts, where the members of the ex-Italian embassy in Tokyo were taken as POWs. He deemed their treatment "humane" and "good". On 14 July 1944, the Italian Social Republic and the Wang Jingwei regime signed a series of agreements, which led to Ferruccio Stefenelli being nominated second-class consul general in Shanghai.

After his return in Italy in 1948, his loyalty to the Italian state and his ties to fascism were questioned by the authorities and Francesco Maria Taliani. However, thanks to an investigation regarding his motives on why he had adhered to the Italian Social Republic, he was given his consular role back with the support of Taliani.

He would leave his post in China, being stationed in Kinshasa, in the Belgian Congo in 1950 after 2 years of stay in Italy. He would then be a Minister Plenipotentiary, in Saigon, State of Vietnam.

He would also become the Consul General of Italy in Australia, Sydney, visiting various Australian cities such as Ayr.

His last diplomatic mission would be in the Republic of Ghana, before retiring in 1964.

He remained a member of the Board of Directors of the Trentino Legion for the rest of his life. In 1970, his wife Noemi degli Alessandrini went missing and assumed dead.

He died in Mezzolombardo on 11 May 1980.

== Awards ==
Gold Medal of Military Valor - ribbon for ordinary uniform

Gold Medal of Military Valor
"A native of Trento and a war volunteer, he was always first in every battle. Vibrant with enthusiasm and faith, he wanted to participate in a fierce attack to conquer a particularly difficult position. Aware of the danger he was exposing himself to, which was extremely serious given his special condition, he resolutely led a group of daredevils into the assault, heedless of the intense enemy fire that was significantly thinning his men. After overcoming two lines of barbed wire, he reached the objective with overwhelming force. Under violent bursts of fire from a nearby enemy position, he boldly rushed towards it, engaging in hand-to-hand combat. Seriously wounded and surrounded, with his few surviving men, by overwhelming enemy forces, he continued to fight with brilliant courage to the end, refusing any medical attention and finally being overwhelmed by the enemy's numbers."
— Col Caprile, December 16, 1917.

Silver Medal of Military Valor - ribbon for ordinary uniform

Silver Medal of Military Valor
"During the attack on enemy positions, with admirable courage and disregard for danger, he repeatedly led his men in bayonet charges. Even when wounded, he continued to encourage them in battle, setting a shining example of courage and tenacity, and only withdrawing after ensuring the defense of the position that had been conquered."
— Mount Ortigara, June 10, 1917.

Bronze Medal of Military Valor - ribbon for ordinary uniform

Bronze Medal of Military Valor
"Despite heavy losses, he volunteered with few men and those from two other platoons left without officers. He reached an important position and valiantly held it until he received the order to retreat."
— Monte Tomba, November 28, 1917.

War Merit Cross (Italy) - ribbon for ordinary uniform

War Merit Cross (Italy)

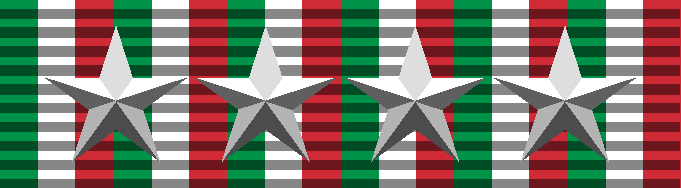
Commemorative medal for the Italian-Austrian War 1915–18 (4 years of campaign) - ribbon for ordinary uniform

Commemorative medal for the Italian-Austrian War 1915–18 (4 years of campaign)

Commemorative Medal of the Unity of Italy - ribbon for ordinary uniform

Commemorative Medal of the Unity of Italy

Allied Victory Medal (Italy) - ribbon for ordinary uniform

Allied Victory Medal (Italy)

Order of the Crown of Italy - ribbon for ordinary uniform

Order of the Crown of Italy

Order of Vittorio Veneto - ribbon for ordinary uniform

Order of Vittorio Veneto

== Bibliography ==
- I quaderni dell'Associazione Nazionale Alpini. Il Labaro. Associazione Nazionale Alpini. 2011. ISBN 978-88-902153-1-5.
- Luigi Cadorna (1921). La guerra alla fronte italiana. Vol. 1. Milano: Fratelli Treves editori.
- Luigi Cadorna (1921). La guerra alla fronte italiana. Vol. 2. Milano: Fratelli Treves editori.
- Gli italiani in guerra. Milano: Ugo Mursia Editore s.r.l. 2014.
