= Caserma Ermanno Carlotto =

Ermanno Carlotto Barrack
- Caserma Ermanno Carlotto
- 20 Guangming Ave, Hebei District, Tianjin, China
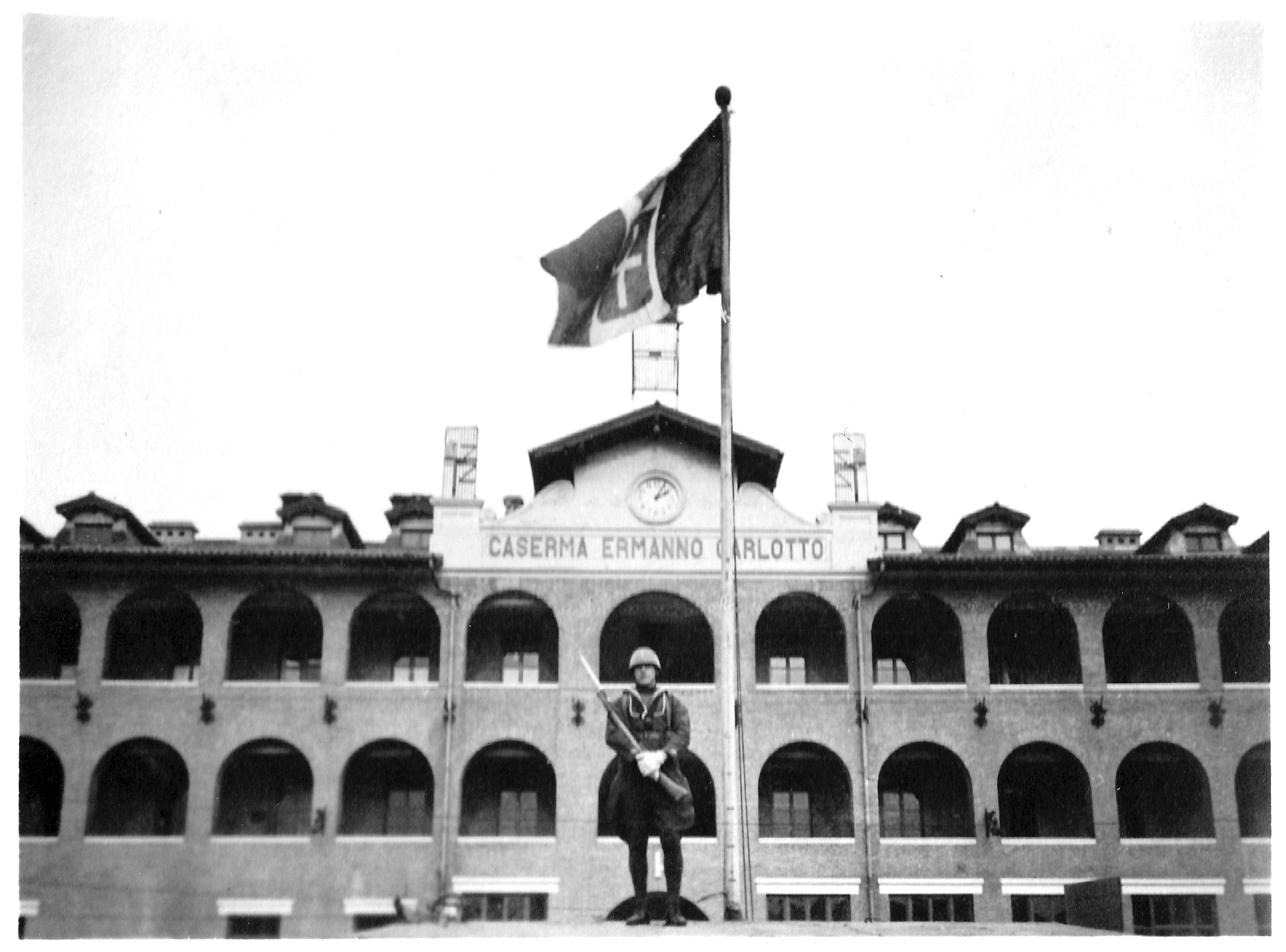
- The barrack in 1939

Site information
- Type: Military base
- Owner: Kingdom of Italy (1919–1943); Empire of Japan (1944); Wang Jingwei (1944–1945); Kingdom of Italy (1946); Republic of Italy (1946–1947); Republic of China (1947–1949); People's Republic of China (1949–today)

Site history
- Built: 1919
- Battles/wars: Battle of the Italian concessions in China (Japanese-Italian War)

The Ermanno Carlotto Barrack (in Chinese 鳴海 Mínghǎi, in Italian Caserma Ermanno Carlotto) was the main infrastructure used by the Royal Italian army in the Italian concession of Tianjin. It is amongst the nine foreign military camps in Tianjin that has been preserved.

== History ==
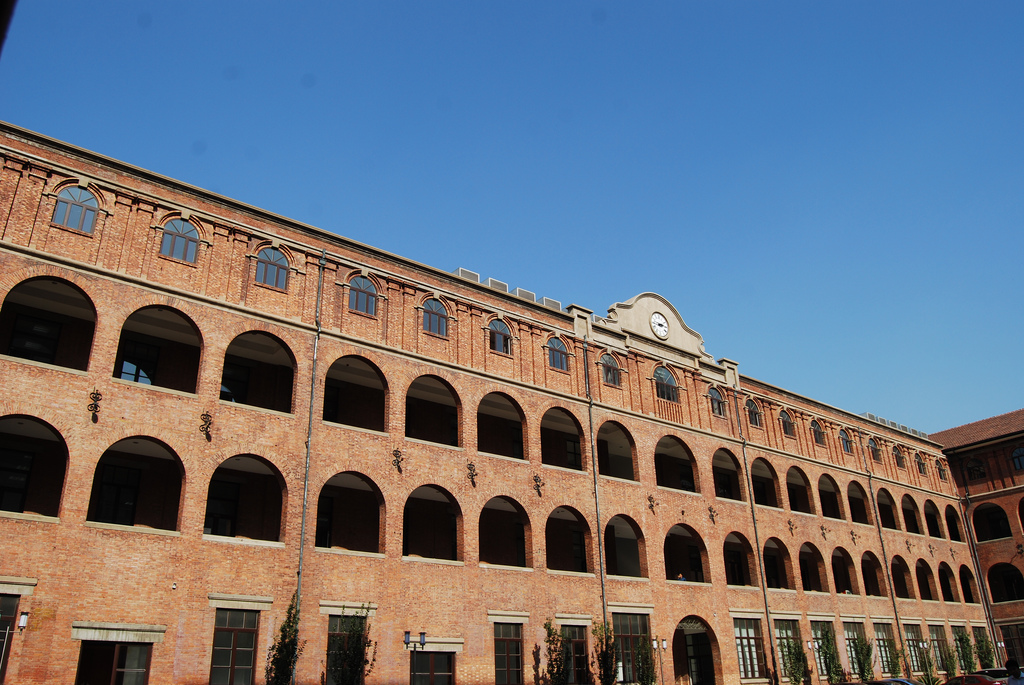
The barrack today

The barrack was created in honour of Lieutenant Ermanno Carlotto who in June 1900, during the Boxer revolt, made a last stand with 20 Italian sailors, and died in the process whilst protecting the city of Tientsin. This sacrifice him led the Kingdom of Italy to award him with a Gold Medal of Military Valor.

The military structure was initially a wooden barrack used as a shelter for the Italian Expeditionary Force in China. In 1919, the infrastructure was repurposed to house the soldiers of the Legione Redenta from Siberia.

After some modernization processes that occurred throughout the 1920s in the Italian concession of Tianjin, the barrack was enlarged and inaugurated in April 1926. It housed 600 men from the San Marco Regiment. It was inaugurated by the Italian representative in China, Vittorio Cerruti, on 18 April 1928. The barrack was also visited unofficially by the ex-Chinese emperor Puyi on 21 April 1933, who met Edda Ciano.

On 9 September, during the battle of the Italian concessions (Japanese-Italian War), the barracks became one of the last resistance strongholds of the concession against the Japanese, and housed various Chinese and Italian civilians, Ferruccio Stefenelli, and soldiers. On 10 September 1943, the Empire of Japan occupied the barrack, and in 1944, the Italian Social Republic handed over the concession alongside the barracks to Wang Jingwei's regime.

In the aftermath of World War II the barrack saw U.S. Marine Corps being stationed in it.

In 1947 the barrack and the concession was handed over by the Italian Republic to the Republic of China, and the barrack ultimately fell under the People's Republic of China's jurisdiction in 1949.

Even today the barrack guests a division of the People's Armed Police. It was identified as a national priority protected site by the government of the People's Republic of China.

== Related topics ==
- Concessione italiana di Tientsin
- Ermanno Carlotto
- Japanese-Italian War
