= Manwen Laodang =

Manwen Laodang (Chinese: 滿文老檔) is a set of Manchu official documents of the Qing dynasty, compiled during the late Qianlong period based on Jiu Manzhou Dang.

== Two editions ==
It was difficult to understand Old Manchu, written in the script without dots and circles, in the Qianlong period. Translation of old archives into Standard Manchu was started in 1775. Two versions, namely the Beijing edition and the Mukden edition, were created. Both editions slept deep inside the palaces.

Each edition contains both "tongki fuka sindaha hergen i dangse" (archives in the script with dots and circles) and "tongki fuka akū hergen i dangse" (archives in the script without dots and circles). The former is written in Standard Manchu. The Beijing edition gives commentaries to arcane passages and Manchu translations to Mongolian texts. The latter is basically written in Old Manchu. Note that it is not identical with Jiu Manzhou Dang since duplications of original archives were eliminated from Manwen Laodang. Some old archives written in Standard Manchu are reduced to Old Manchu but the rest is kept in the original language.

== Discovery ==
The Mukden edition was discovered by the Japanese historian Naito Torajiro in 1905 and he named it Manwen Laodang (Mambun Rōtō). He filmed the archives in the script with dots and circles in 1912 and brought them to Japan. The Beijing edition was discovered in 1931.
