= Jiu Manzhou Dang =

Jiu Manzhou Dang (Chinese: 舊滿洲檔; Manchu: ᡶᡝ ᠮᠠᠨᠵᡠ ᡩᠠᠩᠰᡝ Fe Manju Dangse) is a set of Manchu archives stored at the National Palace Museum in Taipei, Taiwan. It is the sourcebook of Manwen Laodang and a primary source of early Manchu history. It is often called yuandang (原檔 original archives).

It covers official Manchu documents from the 3rd month of the 35th year of the Wanli Emperor (1607) to the 12th month of the 1st year of Chongde (1636). Archives are mostly written in the script without dots and circles. Although Dahai is said to have invented the script with dots and circles in 1632, subsequent archives occasionally, but not always, add dots and circles. Standard Manchu required time to establish.

Jiu Manzhou Dang was discovered in 1931, a month after the discovery of the Beijing edition of Manwen Laodang. Three more volumes were found in 1935. It was moved from place to place due to long-running wars and was finally carried to Taiwan by the Kuomintang. The study on original archives was started in 1960s. The National Palace Museum published the copy under the name Jiu Manzhou Dang in 1969.

The Qing dynasty emperor Hong Taiji claimed that their progenitor, Bukūri Yongšon, was conceived from a virgin birth. According to the legend, three heavenly maidens, namely Enggulen (恩古倫), Jenggulen (正古倫) and Fekulen (佛庫倫), were bathing at a lake called Bulhūri Omo near the Changbai Mountains. A magpie dropped a piece of red fruit near Fekulen, who ate it. She then became pregnant with Bukūri Yongšon. However, another older version of the story by the Hurha (Hurka) tribe member Muksike recorded in 1635 contradicts Hongtaiji's version on location, claiming that it was in Heilongjiang province close to the Amur river where Bulhuri lake was located where the "heavenly maidens" took their bath. This was recorded in the Jiu Manzhou Dang and his much shorter and simpler in addition to being older. This is believed to be the original version and Hongtaiji changed it to Changbai mountain. It shows that the Aisin Gioro clan originated in the Amur area and the Heje (Hezhen) and other Amur valley Jurchen tribes had an oral version of the same tale. It also fits with Jurchen history since some ancestors of the Manchus originated north before the 14th-15th centuries in the Amur and only later moved south.
