= Kemanai =

Kemanai Town 毛馬内町
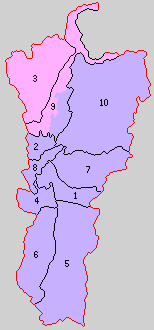
- Interactive map of Kemanai Town
- Established: 1 April 1889
- Abolished: 31 March 1955

Kemanai Town was formerly located in Kazuno, Akita Prefecture. It corresponds to the current Towada Kemanai, Towada Okada, and Towada Setaishi areas of Kazuno City.

== History ==
On 1 April 1889, the implementation of the Town and Village system led to the creation of the town. The town was formed by the merger of the following villages: Kemanai Village, Okada Village, and Setaishi Village.

Up until 1945, the town hosted a POW internment camp which hosted a significant amount of Italians, which were held captives after the events of the Japanese-Italian War. The camp was temporarily coordinated in its last months by Mario Indelli who made sure the civilians were kept safe up until the Allied Forces arrived.

On 31 March 1955 the town would be formally abolished and merged with the now newly established Towada Town. Following a few years, on 1 April 1972, Towada Town merged with Hanawa Town, Osarizawa Town, and Hachimantai Village to form Kazuno.

== Town's name origins ==
The town ends with "nai", which is not that uncommon in Hokkaido and the northern areas of Honshu. Despite being located within Honshu, it seems the name follows a similar trend to the towns present within Hokkaido, thus, as traditionally done there, referring to a relatively large river. In fact, from old documents, Kemanai is thought to be the old name of the Kosaka River and to derive from local Ainu terms.

== Transportation and connections ==
=== Roads ===
- Prefectural Route Morioka Kemanai Line (currently National Route 282)

Currently, the Towada Interchange on the Tohoku Expressway is located within the former town area.

== Local events ==
- Kemanai Bon Dance

== Famous people ==
- Naito Konan
- Wainai Sadayuki
