= Solemn Commendation =

The Solemn Commendation is an Italian military award and part of the military's disciplinary code. It's a specific military honor given to soldiers for their laudable behavior or their actions in battle, and it is published in the daily official reports of the military unit and its superior command structure as an example of "good conduct" and a "good example" for other soldiers and personnel.

The commendation can only be awarded by an official with a military rank that is not lower than an army corps general or an equivalent rank, who explicitly and extensively states their reason for the award and later transcribes it in a personal military diary.

== See also ==
- Eulogy
