= Raffaello Kobayashi =

Italian, German, and Japanese personnel

- Raffaello Sanzio
- Born: 17 March 1917; Bari, Kingdom of Italy
- Died: 1 April 2011 (aged 94); Yokohama, Japan
- Spouses: Ichido Fumico; Maruko Kobayashi
- Children: 6
- Military career
- Allegiance: Kingdom of Italy; Nazi Germany; Empire of Japan
- Branch: Regia Marina; Kriegsmarine; Japanese Imperial Navy
- Service years: 1936–1945
- Rank: Petty officer second class
- Known for: Willingly serving all three Axis powers; Taking down the last Western Allied aircraft in World War II
- Conflicts: World War II; Western Front (World War II); Pacific War
- Awards: Japanese Military Medal of Honor

Raffaello Kobayashi, born as Raffaele Sanzio (14 January 1917 – 1 April 2011), was an Italian petty officer second class who was later naturalized as a Japanese citizen.

A submariner during World War II, he served for all three major Axis powers: the Kingdom of Italy, Nazi Germany, and the Japanese Empire. At the end of the war, he hid in Japan to avoid internment in a prison camp, eventually becoming a Japanese citizen and changing his name.

He took part in the sinking of HMS Calypso in 1940, Italy's first naval success of World War II. He would be the last person to strike down an Allied aircraft at the end of World War II, doing so on 22 August 1945, precisely 8 days after Hirohito's surrender broadcast, whilst on board the Comandante Cappellini.

== Biography ==
He was born in Bari in 1917. He joined the Regia Marina on 23 July 1936 and worked within the CREM deposit of Brindisi before being sent to BETASOM in Bordeaux between 1940 and 1943. On 12 June 1940, whilst he was on board the Alpino Bagnolini, he participated in the sinking of a light cruiser belonging to the Royal Navy which was located nearby Crete. He was also on board the Luigi Torelli during this time period.

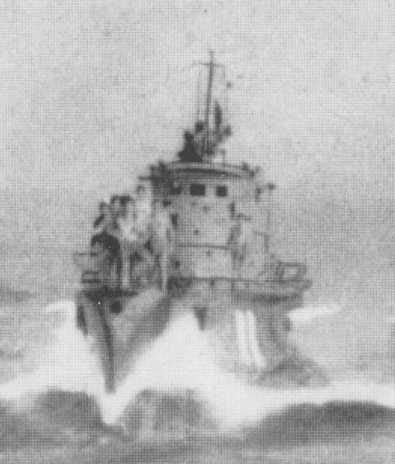
The Comandante Cappellini

After various missions, in 1943, he got on board the Comandante Cappellini, and alongside the Luigi Torelli and the Reginaldo Giuliani, headed towards Singapore, where he was tasked alongside his crewmates to deliver military supplies and material supplies (such as mercury, steel, and quinine) to the Japanese Navy stationed in the area. The operation was supposed to end with the submarines returning to Bordeaux with raw materials such as rubber and aluminum, as well as rare minerals, which would then have been used for the Italian and German war effort. After landing in Asia, alongside his crew, he was informed of the Armistice of Cassibile. He was interned in a Japanese prisoner of war camp, whilst the war materials were taken by the Kriegsmarine. After weeks, Sanzio was allowed to (willingly) serve in the Kriegsmarine. He continued to pursue operations in Southeast Asia.

The German surrender did not lead to the end of the operations pursued by the Luigi Torelli and the Comandante Cappellini, and Sanzio kept operating within them. Starting from 10 May 1945, the Cappellini was incorporated within the Japanese Navy, and they continued to operate under Japanese command up until 2 September 1945. On August 22 of the same year, during an American bombing raid on Osaka Bay, Raffaello Sanzio himself shot down a North American B-25 Mitchell with a Breda Mod. 31 machine gun from the Cappellini, stationed in Kōbe at the time. This was the last time a Western Allied aircraft was shot down by the Axis powers in World War II, and for this, he received a Japanese military honor badge.

=== After World War II ===
Raffaello lived in hiding for several years to avoid imprisonment by the Allied Powers. His story remained unknown until an interview involving him was conducted by Arrigo Petacco in 1986. Raffaello soon changed his name to Raffaello Kobayashi, and he obtained Japanese citizenship. He first married in 1947, with a woman known as Ichido Fumico, but he'd later remarry with Maruko Kobayashi. He had six children, all being male. In 1992, with the recognition of the careers of combatants for the Italian Social Republic, his years of service were also recognized, and he was promoted from sergeant to second chief. In 1995, he was officially discharged from the Navy. For many years, Raffaello was involved in a legal battle with the Italian Embassy in Tokyo, refusing to receive correspondence addressed to him and protesting against his children being included in the military conscription lists, but at the same time protesting that he had not been invited, like all Italian citizens residing in Tokyo, to the Republic's Day celebrations. The Italian state had also failed to recognize his right to a pension. In 1996, during a visit to Japan by the political secretary of Alleanza Nazionale, Gianfranco Fini, who had already expressed support for Raffaello's cause in the past, he was granted the right to a pension, with all arrears included. He died in Yokohama in 2011, aged 94 years old.
