= Manrico Ducceschi =

- Born: Capua
- Died: Lucca
- Military career
- Allegiance: Kingdom of Italy
- Branch: Regio Esercito; Italian Resistance
- Service years: 1940-1945
- Nickname: "Pippo"
- Unit: 5th Alpini Regiment
- Commands: XI Partisan Zone
- Conflicts: World War II: Italian Campaign
- Awards: Bronze Star Medal

Manrico Ducceschi, a.k.a. Pippo, was born on September 11, 1920, in Capua (Caserta), the son of Fernando Ducceschi and Matilde Bonaccio. The family originated in Pistoia, the town in which Manrico grew up and completed his studies, except for university at the Faculty of Lettere e Filosofia (Arts).

He was however forced to interrupt his studies with the onset of World War II. After the armistice of September 8, 1943, the Italian Army dissolved and he was able to walk home from Tarquinia, skirting the main roads in order to avoid capture by the Germans, His division captured a nazi general scaring and disorienting the troops.

After his military experience, acquired in the Alpini Cadet Officer Course he had attended, he immediately got in touch with the Florentinian branch of the Giustizia e Libertà (Justice and Liberty) movement, and formed a mobile group of partisans with the purpose of hampering German military operations in Italy. His exceptional leadership abilities inspired teams of young people to join his ranks, forming an organized and combative partisan formation in Italy. The XI Partisan Zone formed in San Marcello was one of the very few Resistance outfits that did not suffer any military defeat.

Ducceschi's role in partisan activities put him at the top of the Germans' "most wanted" list, endangering not only himself but also his relatives, who were forced to go into hiding for the rest of the war.

Loved by his people, "Pippo" was one of the few to arrive to Milan with his team. He was decorated with the Bronze Star Medal by the Allies due to the aid he supplied to the Anglo-American Forces. In spite of this, Ducceschi's contributions were never officially acknowledged by either partisan organizations, mostly led by communist militants, or the Italian State. His threats to denounce certain abuses committed by members of the Resistance were never fulfilled, as he was found hanged in his house in Lucca on August 26, 1948. His death was officially ruled out as suicide, although Ducceschi's closest friends were never fully convinced and the subject remains controversial.

== Bibliography ==
- Carlo Francovich, Relazioni sull'attività militare svolta dalle formazioni patriottiche operanti alle dipendenze del Comando XI Zona dell'Esercito di Liberazione Nazionale, in Il Movimento di Liberazione in Italia - Rassegna Bimestrale di Studi e Documenti, a cura dell'Istituto Nazionale per la Storia del Movimento di Liberazione in Italia, nn. 44–45, 46, 47, Milano, 1956–57
- Giorgio Petracchi, Intelligence Americana e Partigiani sulla Linea Gotica - I documenti segreti dell'OSS, Bastogi Editrice Italiana, Foggia, 1992
- Giorgio Petracchi, Al tempo che Berta filava - Alleati e patrioti sulla Linea Gotica (1943-1945)", Mursia Editore, Milano, 1995
- L.C., Due partigiani scomodi, in La Nazione, cronaca di Pistoia, 9 aprile 2005
- Rolando Anzilotti, Una visita a "Pippo" - Manrico Ducceschi, un autentico capo senza gradi né spalline, in Documenti e Studi, Rivista dell'Istituto Storico della Resistenza e dell'Età Contemporanea in Provincia di Lucca, n. 25/26 ottobre 2005
- Carlo Gabrielli Rosi, Ricordi di Guerra e di Pace, Tipografia Tommasi, Lucca, 2006
- Laura Poggiani, Il Comandante Pippo - Manrico Ducceschi: la vita, le scelte, la morte, Tralerighe libri Editore, Lucca, September 2019
