= Junovicz P.A.1 =

- Place of origin: Austria-Hungary

Service history
- In service: 1915-1918
- Used by: Austro-Hungarian Army
- Wars: World War I

Production history
- Designer: Rudolf Junovicz
- Produced: 1915-1917
- No. built: 5

Specifications (Based on initial 3 vehicles.)
- Mass: 2,996 kg
- Length: 5,690 mm
- Width: 1,900 mm
- Height: 3,510 mm
- Crew: 5
- Armor: 7 mm front, 5 mm sides
- Main armament: 2 x Schwarzlose machine gun
- Engine: Fiat 4-cylinder 40 HP
- Ground clearance: 150 mm
- Operational range: 340 km
- Maximum speed: 35 km/h

The Junovicz P.A.1 (Pancél Auto 1) was an armored car of Austria-Hungary, designed by Hauptmann Junovicz. Five were built.

== History and operation ==
Prior to the outbreak of World War I, the Austro-Hungarian Army felt that armored cars did not match their military philosophy and tactics. This school of thought was soon challenged by their encounters with the armored cars of Russia and Italy.

First Lieutenant Engineer Rudolf Junovicz decided that what was needed was a universal armored body that could fit on multiple truck chassis, leading to five improvised designs built upon 3-ton truck bodies (3ton Subventionslastautos). The first three were built in 1915 based on the ÖAF Austro-Fiat 2TV, while two more followed in 1917 built on the Fross-Büssing 36 PS and Saurer 34 PS. No changes were made to the transmission, engine, or chassis of the trucks themselves. The later models are sometimes known as the Type II or B, and featured slightly different dimensions and design due to the use of different truck bodies being used.

The P.A.1 featured riveted armor, 7mm thick at the front, and 5mm thick on both sides. Overall weight was at least 4 tons. It was powered by a 40 HP, 12L Fiat engine. The radiator was protected by an armored plate that could be raised to keep from overheating when not in combat. A single headlight was mounted on the front of the hood. Access was via a rear door, two hatches on the sides, and two on the roof. Crew consisted of 5 men: driver, commander, two gunners and a loader. It was armed with two Schwarzlose 1907/12 machine guns, one facing forward and the other fitted to one of the four ports on the sides as appropriate. 6,000 rounds of 8mm ammunition were carried.

One source states that two more vehicles were built using a Berna-Perl 35 HP chassis and a Rába-V 50 HP chassis, as well as two more planned (but never completed) using the Laurin & Klement 1914M chassis.

Unfortunately there is little information regarding the operational history of these vehicles other than one in particular. One vehicle was deployed in Serbia, and later transferred to the Isonzo Front in 1915. In 1916 it was sent to the Eastern Front, where it was used for three patrols but did not engage with any enemy forces. In 1918 it was transferred to the 6th Army in Udine, Italy. On June 1, 1918, the K.u.K. Panzerautozug 1 (Armored Car Platoon 1) was formed, and the P.A.1 was attached to it. The difficult terrain in Italy meant that the platoon did not see much action and was kept in reserve around Udine in preparation for a big breakthrough that never came. It is unknown what happened to any of the vehicles after the war ended.
