= Mario Indelli =

Italian diplomat and ambassador (1886–1956)

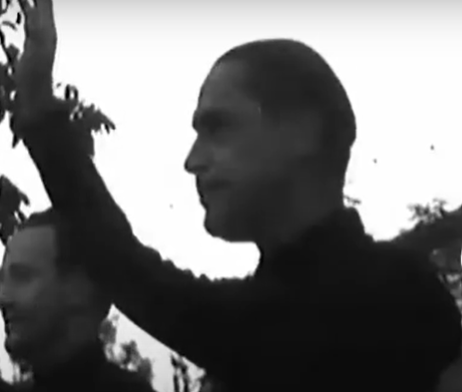
- Indelli in 1936, during his stay in Durrës, doing the roman salute

Italian ambassador in the Kingdom of Albania

Consul and Ambassador
- Preceded by: Ottaviano Armando Kock
- Succeeded by: Francesco Jacomoni

Italian ambassador in the Kingdom of Yugoslavia
- Preceded by: Guido Viola di Campalto
- Succeeded by: Francesco Mameli

Italian ambassador in the Japanese Empire
- Preceded by: Giacinto Auriti
- Succeeded by: Giovanni Revedin di San Martino

Personal details
- Born: 1 April 1886 Florence, Kingdom of Italy
- Died: 19 December 1956 (aged 70) Rome, Italy

Mario Indelli (1 April 1886 – 19 December 1956) was an Italian diplomat and ambassador who served the Kingdom of Italy and the Republic of Italy.

== Biography ==
Indelli was born in Florence on 1 April 1886. He was the son of Luigi Indelli (1828–1903), a lawyer with multiple mandates within the House of Deputies of the Kingdom of Italy, and brother of another diplomat, Paolo Francesco Indelli, who held the position of general consul and consul from 1910 to 1920. Indelli studied jurisprudence at the University of Bologna, where he graduated on 26 April 1910.

Indelli died in Rome on 19 December 1956.

== Diplomatic career ==
Upon being appointed as a consular officer, having passed the competitive examination for entry into the diplomatic service, he was assigned to Alexandria, Egypt, by order of 27 March 1911. Starting from May 1911, he operated under the services of the Italian Ministry of Foreign Affairs. On 26 May 1912, he was promoted to second-class consul and, in July 1912, he held the position of secretary to the Italian delegate at the Italian-Argentine health conference. On 16 February 1913, he was assigned to Smyrna (now İzmir), under the Ottoman Empire, with consular duties and, in December of the same year, to Aydın. Then, in 1914, he returned to Smyrna. In July 1914, he was promoted to first-class consul and, from 1 October 1915, he was assigned to Nice, France.

Vice-Consul in Smyrna in 1918–1919, he was then secretary of the Italian delegation to the Lausanne Conference (in 1922–1923) and, promoted to secretary of legation, and later assigned to the Directorate General of Political Affairs of the Ministry of Foreign Affairs, where he worked until he was assigned to missions abroad once again. Starting from 28 September 1934, having been promoted to the title of extraordinary envoy and minister plenipotentiary he was assigned to represent the Kingdom of Italy within the Kingdom of Albania, and later on, starting from 7 August 1936, he was assigned the same role of representation within the Kingdom of Yugoslavia. His last assigned diplomatic role lasted from 1940 to 1946, in which he was the ambassador of Italy in the Japanese Empire. He was interned by the Japanese following 8 September 1943, right before the Japanese-Italian War.

After the war Indelli returned to Italy, where he retired on 1 June 1947 after 36 years of diplomatic service.

== Bibliography ==
- Brusasca, Giuseppe (1949). Il Ministero degli Affari Esteri al servizio del popolo italiano (1943-1949). Tipografia riservata del Ministero degli esteri, Roma.
- Università degli Studi di Lecce – Dipartimento di Scienze Storiche e Sociali (1967). La Formazione della Diplomazia Nazionale (1861-1915), Repertorio bio-bibliografico dei funzionari del Ministero degli Affari Esteri. Istituto Poligrafico e Zecca dello Stato, Roma.
- Gusso, Massimo (2022). Italia e Giappone: dal Patto Anticomintern alla dichiarazione di guerra del luglio 1945. Inquiete convergenze, geopolitica, diplomazia, conflitti globali e drammi individuali (1934-1952). Edizioni Ca’ Foscari, Venezia.
- Gusso, Massimo (2023). L'ambasciatore Mario Indelli (1886-1956). Appunti e materiali per una biografia diplomatica. in Academia.edu.
