= Roberto de Leonardis =

Italian film scriptwriter and lyricist

Roberto De Leonardis
- Born: 4 February 1913; Naples, Kingdom of Italy
- Died: 21 September 1984 (aged 71); Rome, Italy
- Occupations: Translator; screenwriter; lyricist
- Years active: 1949–1984
- Known for: Dubbing
- Children: Andrea De Leonardis

Roberto De Leonardis (4 February 1913 – 21 September 1984) was an Italian film script translator, film dialogue writer and film lyricist, best known for his long-lasting cooperation with the Walt Disney Company, being basically a monopolist in writing scripts for dubbing Disney's films into Italian, from the late 1940s to his death.

He was known as a meticulous translator, faithfully adapting the English-language peculiarities to the Italian audience.

== Biography ==
He was born in Naples to a family of an Italian Navy admiral. He followed his father's career and graduated as an officer from the Military Academy in Livorno, Tuscany. During World War II he was commanding officer of an Italian naval ship. In 1943, after Italy surrendered to the Allies, his ship was captured by the Japanese, and he was detained as a POW until the Americans freed him in 1945.

In the beginning of his film career he was a lyricist under the pseudonym "Pertitas". (Note: "Pertitas" is a bureaucratic abbreviation for "per titolare assente": "(signing) for the absent signatory")

In 1949 he founded a documentary short film production company Filmeco. In 1958 he closed Filmeco and founded the Royfilm company, which almost exclusively did dubbing of films into Italian. It dubbed not only for Disney, but also for other studios, such as Metro-Goldwyn-Mayer, Paramount, and Universal.

== Commemoration ==
In 1997 he was posthumously inducted into the Disney Legends Hall of Fame.

The 1983 Federico Fellini film E la nave va, whose Italian-language dialogue was edited by de Leonardis, features a cameo: the name of the captain of the ship (Italian: comandante della nave) is Roberto de Leonardis, a hint to the nickname of the real de Leonardis, "Comandante", and his former naval occupation.

A comprehensive biography of de Leonardis was published in 2017 by Nunziante Valoroso in the book Un comandante alla corte di Walt Disney. La carriera di Roberto de Leonardis leggenda del doppiaggio.
