= List of British Empire–related topics =

This is a list of topics related to the British Empire.

== City status ==
- British overseas cities

== Commonwealth ==
- Commonwealth of Nations

== Communications ==
- All Red Line

== Geography ==
- Territorial evolution of the British Empire
- "The empire on which the sun never sets"

== Government ==
- British Raj (1858–1947) sometimes unofficially known as the "Indian Empire"
- Colonial Office
- Company rule in India (1757–1858)
- Foreign and Commonwealth Office
- Monarchy of the United Kingdom
- Viceroy

== Historians ==
- Historiography of the British Empire
- Pageant of Empire
- The Cambridge History of the British Empire
- The Oxford History of the British Empire

== Wars and conflicts ==
- American Revolution
- Imperial fortress
- The Troubles, in Northern Ireland
- Easter Rising, in Ireland 1916
