= British nation =

The term British nation may refer to:

- The United Kingdom, a sovereign country in north-western Europe
- British people, the citizens of the United Kingdom of Great Britain and Northern Ireland, the British Overseas Territories, and the Crown dependencies.

== See also ==
- British countries (disambiguation)
