= Countries of Britain =

Generally, countries of Britain can mean:

- Countries of the United Kingdom
- Countries of the British Empire
