= British overseas cities =

Places with city status outside the UK

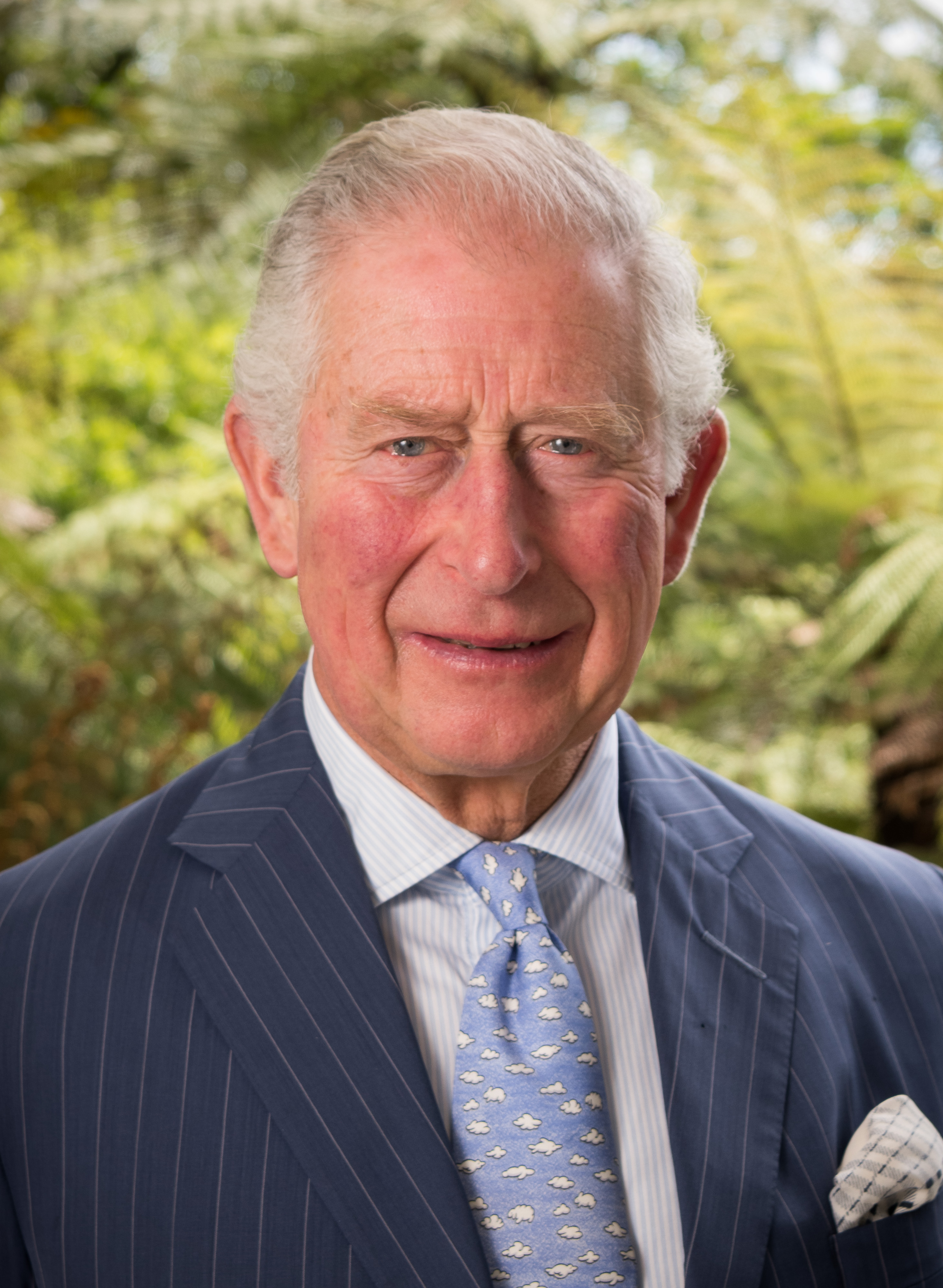
City status is granted by the monarch on advice from government ministers, which since 2022 has been Charles III

Outside of the United Kingdom, city status has been awarded on behalf of the Monarch to various settlements throughout the existence of the British Empire. City status is a honorific title that has been used in the United Kingdom and its predecessor states since the medieval period. As of 2022, there are five cities outside of the United Kingdom with the status; four in the British Overseas Territories and one in the Crown Dependency of the Isle of Man.

Historically various other settlements held the status during the British Empire, until their countries gained independence primarily in the 20th century. The power to designate city status in the United Kingdom, British Overseas Territories and Crown Dependencies, continues to be vested ultimately with the UK Government and the present sovereign and head of state Charles III.

== Current overseas cities ==
City	Year granted or confirmed	Cathedral (until 1863) / occasion	Territory/Dependency	Status	Image	Population (Census)
Gibraltar	1842	Cathedral of the Holy Trinity	Gibraltar, southwestern Europe Map	British Overseas Territory		32,688 (2022)
Jamestown	1859	St Paul's	Saint Helena, Ascension and Tristan da Cunha, South Atlantic Ocean Map	British Overseas Territory		629 (2016)
Hamilton	1897	Awarded for Queen Victoria's Diamond Jubilee	Bermuda, North Atlantic Ocean Map	British Overseas Territory		854 (2016)
Stanley	2022	Awarded for Queen Elizabeth II's Platinum Jubilee	Falkland Islands, South Atlantic Ocean Map	British Overseas Territory		2,460 (2016)
Douglas (Manx: Doolish)	2022	Awarded for Queen Elizabeth II's Platinum Jubilee	Isle of Man, Irish Sea Map	Crown Dependency		26,677 (2021)

=== Map of cities in Overseas Territories and Crown Dependencies ===
Location of cities in Overseas Territories and Crown Dependencies:
Cities in Overseas Territories

== History ==
British Overseas Territories and Crown Dependencies cities began as settlements in foreign lands controlled by England during medieval times from the 12th century as English overseas possessions, later from 1707 after union with Scotland becoming termed as the British Empire comprising Crown Colonies, which after a reduction of these due to countries being granted independence, became known as the British Dependent Territories, and this further evolved into the present British Overseas Territories and Crown Dependencies. As these sometimes far-flung lands became established, locals and British settlers from the most notable settlements began to request privileges as a validation of their importance, and city status was one of the more dignified honours handed out to a select few communities, other title types including becoming a borough.

In England where city status began, a number of settlements which contained a cathedral initially were regarded as important places, especially after the Norman Invasion, with Norman leaders requesting that bishops base these within a recognisable location closer to the population. Later on, many of these notable towns were formally given city status using a legal instrument such as a city charter and later using letters patent. Certain overseas territories such Ireland began to follow this trend until the later 1800s, after which the designation became disassociated to cathedrals and other merits came into play, such as population size.

=== Ireland ===
The first English overseas expansion occurred as early as 1169, when the Norman invasion of Ireland began to establish English possessions in Ireland, with it initially styled as a lordship and later a dependent kingdom, before full union with the UK in 1800. City status there tended historically to be granted by royal charter. The criteria depended less on the presence of a cathedral, and there are many towns in Ireland with Church of Ireland cathedrals that have never been called cities. In 1923 Ireland was partitioned and became an independent state; Northern Ireland continues to be a part of the UK.

=== France ===
Prior to the commune status that cities in France presently hold, in medieval times French Normans from the House of Normandy, English Angevin and Plantagenet kings held large swathes of territory such as the Duchy of Normandy as part of the wider Angevin Empire for which the ownership was continually disputed and culminated in the Hundred Years' War. Normandy was held until 1204 but forfeited to French kings, and remaining French land was held with them being feudal tenants-in-chief, so any control of city privileges continued to lay with French nobility and monarchs.

During the period a number of towns were given charters with varying levels of self-government and status. The grant of city status was much like England, generally based on cathedral status. This was sometimes confirmed by the use of city seals which were not necessarily connected to the presence of a church, although France was one of the more highly populated European countries of the period and had many cathedrals, by which more heavily inhabited areas were more likely to be given privileges.

=== Crown colonies and British overseas expansion ===
As the English empire expanded into the New World and parts of the old at the end of the medieval age, there were calls from these early communities for self-governance and charters were issued occasionally, sometimes by local governors which were ratified by monarchs. Unlike England, these early grants did not depend on the settlement having an ecclesiastical centre. Although many settlements had begun to build churches, the Church of England had not begun to create overseas dioceses until 1787, and the Colonial Office were given the power to declare cities in Crown colonies by letters patent when appointing bishops after a cathedral had been established. The first overseas place in this period to have a diocese in place (1793) and cathedral (1804) before a grant of city status (1832) was Quebec City, Canada. Later, Gibraltar, Jamestown, St Helena and several others were bestowed the status at the same time as the establishment of the diocese with diocesan letters patent instead of city status letters patent.

However, after a number of court cases, from 1863 the Privy Council ruled that the Church of England did not have jurisdiction over overseas dioceses in many circumstances where those countries had been given self-government, and therefore deprecating this short-lived tradition of royal grant establishing bishop sees at the same time as granting city status in the Empire, causing concerns on the patents issued; Goulburn in Australia for example found itself declared a city twice - once by letters patent in 1863 and once by law in 1885 after doubts arose to its status. As core colonies obtained local legislatures and dominions formed responsible government administrations (primarily those in present-day Australia, Canada, New Zealand and South Africa), they adapted the laws of settlement incorporation and city status to be based on measures such as size of population and local revenue. Sensing the wind of change, creation of cities in the UK continued to be based on post-creation of dioceses until 1888 when the practice was discontinued, and later cities in Britain and overseas places such as Hamilton, Bermuda were instead granted the status by petitioning monarchs via officials or on royal occasions such as jubilees.

List of British Empire cities before independence (except Ireland)
British Empire city	Year	Territory/Colony/Dependency	Present country	Citations	Notes
Gorgeana	1641	Massachusetts Bay Colony	United States		Renamed York, Maine, and reverted to a town after being annexed by Massachusetts colony in 1652
New York	1686	New York	United States		Was a city (New Amsterdam) under the Dutch from 1653
Albany	1686	New York	United States		Created a city by the Dongan charter
Chennai (Madras)	1688	Fort St. George	India		
Philadelphia	1701	Pennsylvania	United States		
Annapolis	1708	Maryland	United States		
Williamsburg	1722	Virginia	United States		First US non-governor charter
Saint John, New Brunswick	1785	New Brunswick	Canada		
Kingston	1802	Jamaica	Jamaica		
Montreal	1832	Upper Canada	Canada		
Quebec City	1832	Upper Canada	Canada		First non-UK city with a cathedral prior to grant
Toronto	1834	Lower Canada	Canada		
Adelaide	1840	South Australia	Australia		
Halifax	1841	Nova Scotia	Canada		
Sydney	1842	New South Wales	Australia		Confirmed in 1885
Georgetown	1842	Guiana	Guyana		
St John's	1842	Leeward Islands	Antigua and Barbuda		
Bridgetown	1842	Windward Islands	Barbados		
Hobart Town	1843	Tasmania	Australia		
Kingston, Ontario	1846	Lower Canada	Canada		
Hamilton, Ontario	1846	Lower Canada	Canada		
Melbourne	1847	New South Wales	Australia		
Fredericton*	1848	New Brunswick	Canada		
Victoria	1849	Hong Kong	China		
Charlottetown*	1855	Prince Edward Island	Canada		
London*	1855	Lower Canada	Canada		
Ottawa*	1855	Lower Canada	Canada		
Perth	1856	Western Australia	Australia		
Christchurch	1856	New Zealand	New Zealand		
Nelson	1858	New Zealand	New Zealand		
New Westminster*	1860	British Columbia	Canada		
Nassau	1861	Bahamas	Bahamas		
Cape Town	1861	Cape Colony	South Africa		
Victoria*	1862	British Columbia	Canada		
Dunedin*	1862	New Zealand	New Zealand		
Goulburn	1863	New South Wales	Australia		Confirmed in 1885
Wellington*	1870	New Zealand	New Zealand		
Auckland*	1871	New Zealand	New Zealand		
Mumbai (Bombay)	1872	Bombay Presidency	India		
Winnipeg*	1874	Dominion of Canada	Canada		
Vancouver*	1886	Dominion of Canada	Canada		
Victoria, Gozo (Rabat)	1887	Malta	Malta		Granted for the Golden Jubilee of Queen Victoria
Calgary*	1894	Dominion of Canada	Canada		
Brisbane*	1902	Australia			
Port of Spain	1914	Windward Islands	Trinidad and Tobago		
Johannesburg*	1928	Union of South Africa	South Africa		
Pretoria*	1931	Union of South Africa	South Africa		
Harare (Salisbury)*	1935	Southern Rhodesia	Zimbabwe		
Nairobi	1950	Kenya Colony	Kenya		
Singapore (Note: The city functioned as the capital of Singapore until its abolishment in 1965. After its independence as a sovereign state in 1965, the Central Area occupies this role in practice, functioning as a de facto capital without any formal designation.)	1951	Colony of Singapore	Singapore		
George Town, Penang	1957	Crown Colony of Penang	Malaysia		
Lusaka	1960	Northern Rhodesia	Zambia		
Port Louis	1960	British Mauritius	Mauritius		
Kampala	1962	Protectorate of Uganda	Uganda		Grant by letters patent on day of independence

(brackets) contain former place names which the original grant may reference

* a select number of notable cities granted the status by responsible government administrations (given the status by local legislature without royal prerogative) but prior to independence are indicated

=== Post British Empire ===
The description of the remaining overseas lands were changed from colonies and 'dependencies of the crown' in 1983 to British Dependent Territories and later either British Overseas Territories from 2002 and Crown Dependencies. The last populated city of significance was Victoria, Hong Kong with its parent territory reverting to China in 1997, leaving relatively small resident populations in the remaining cities. Since the second Millennium, competitions have been arranged by the government to grant the status to UK settlements and this power remains delegated to it and the monarch. In 2021, submissions for city status were invited to mark the Platinum Jubilee of Elizabeth II, with Crown Dependencies and British Overseas Territories being allowed to take part for the first time. The applicants on the British Overseas Territories were George Town (in the Cayman Islands), Gibraltar, Stanley (in the Falkland Islands); of the Crown Dependencies these were Douglas and Peel (both in the Isle of Man). It was later discovered that Gibraltar had been previously named a city, researchers at The National Archives confirming that Gibraltar's city status was still in effect, with the territory missing from the official list of cities for the past 140 years. Stanley and Douglas were later granted the honour, making a total of five cities.

== See also ==
- Territorial evolution of the British Empire
- Historical development of Church of England dioceses
- List of cities in the United Kingdom

== Bibliography ==
- Hallam, Elizabeth M; Everard, Judith (2001). Capetian France 987–1328. Pearson. ISBN 978-0582404281.
