= City of Singapore (historical entity) =

City in Singapore (1951–1965)

Singapore
- Capital city
- City of Singapore
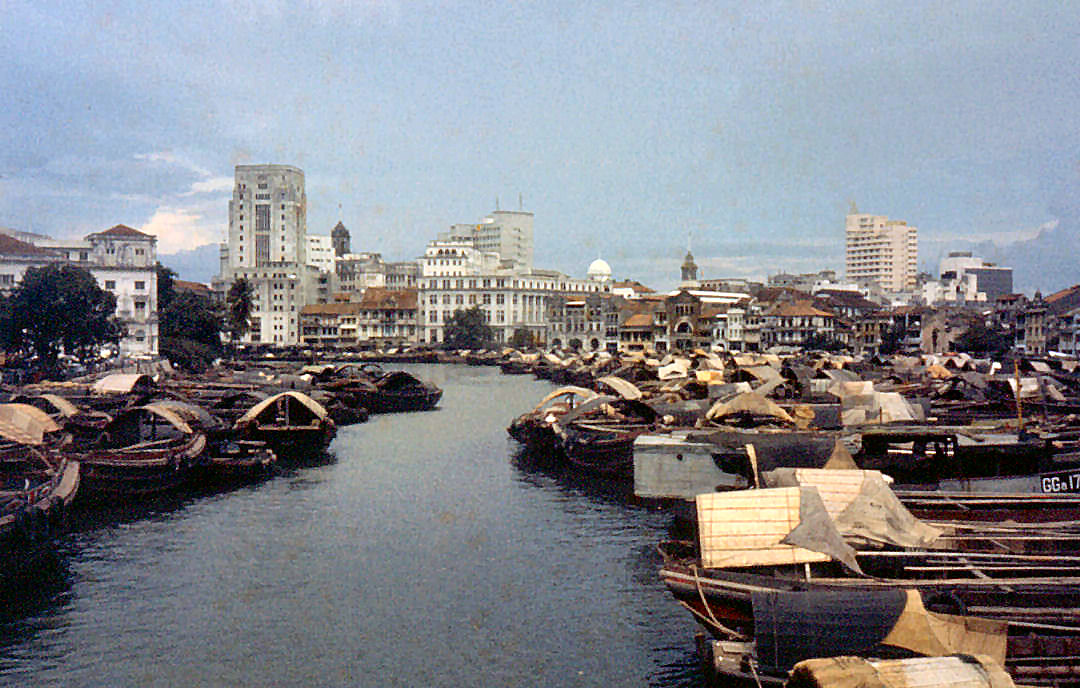
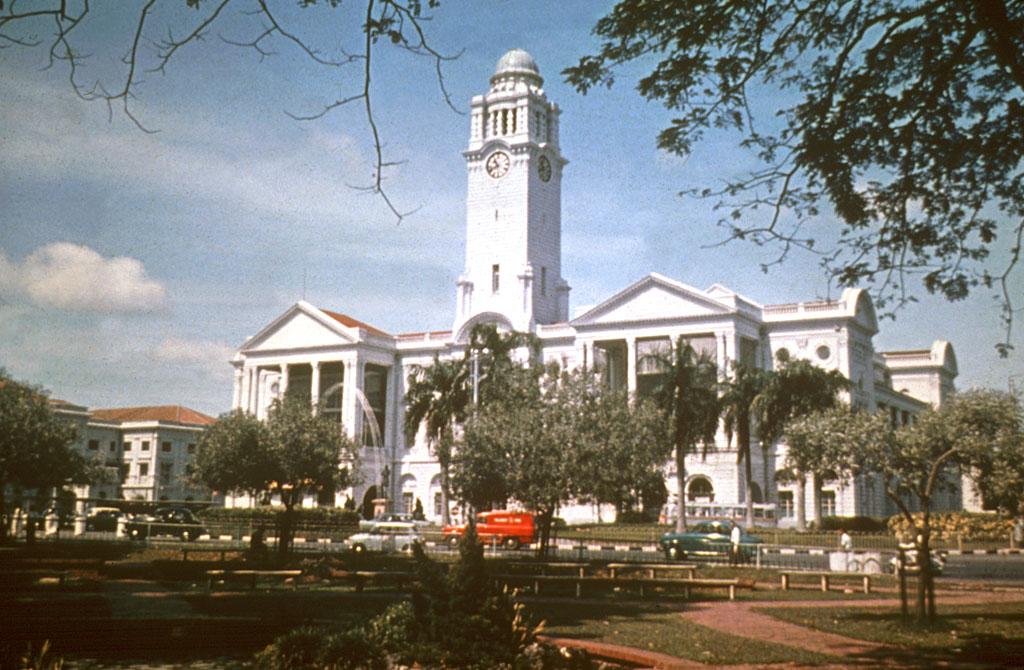
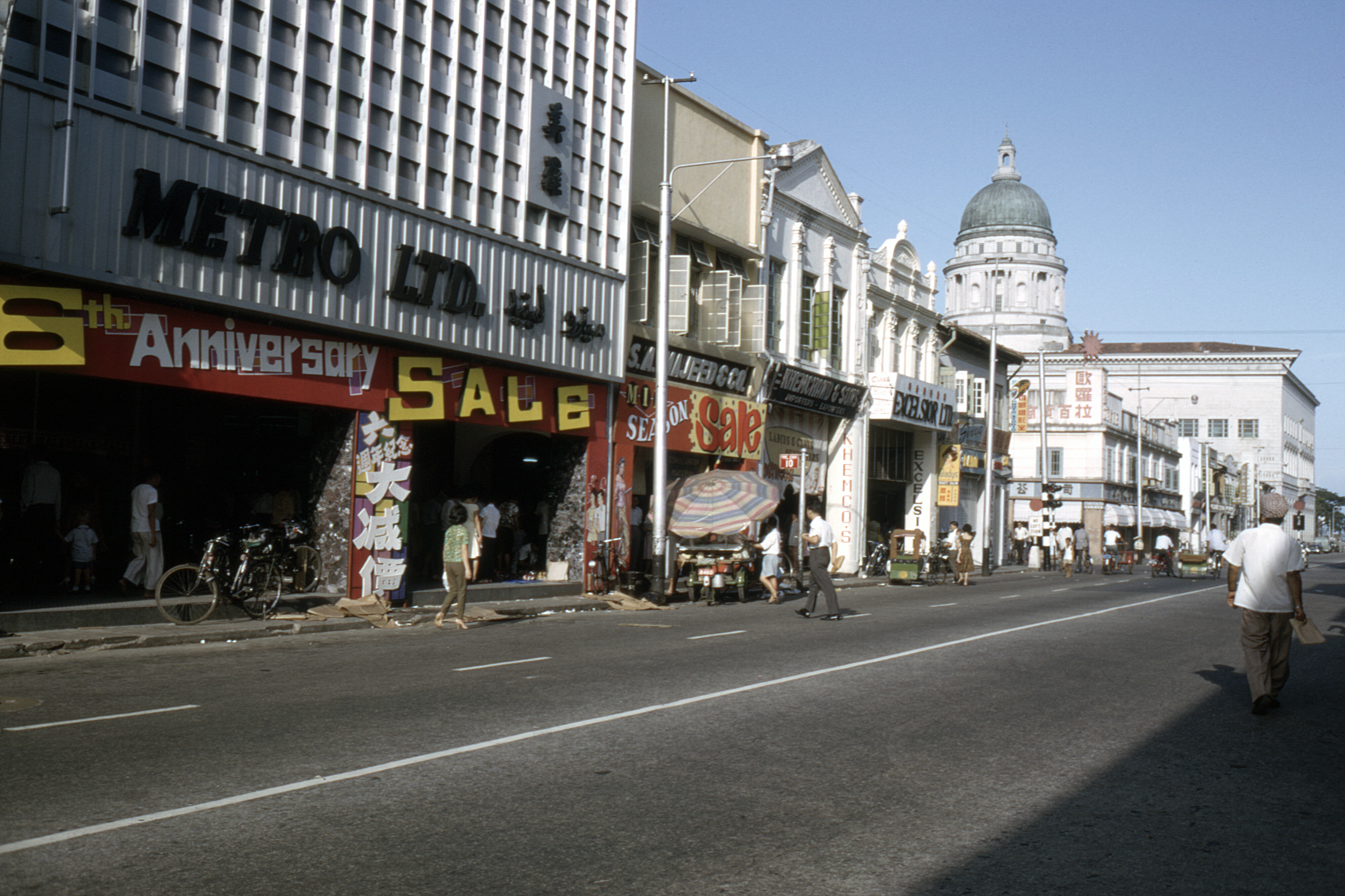
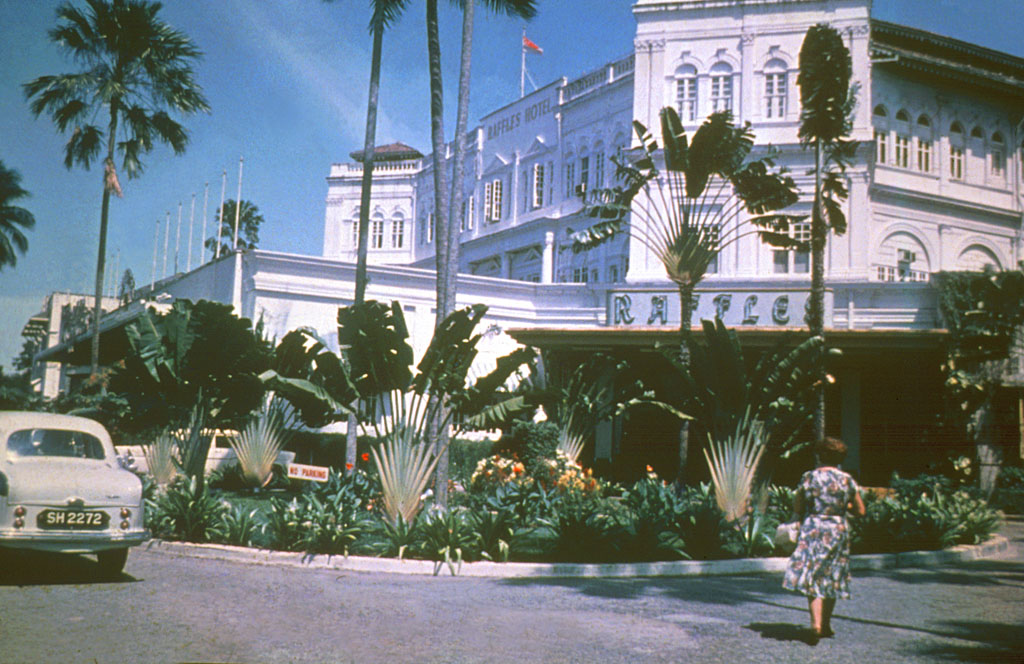
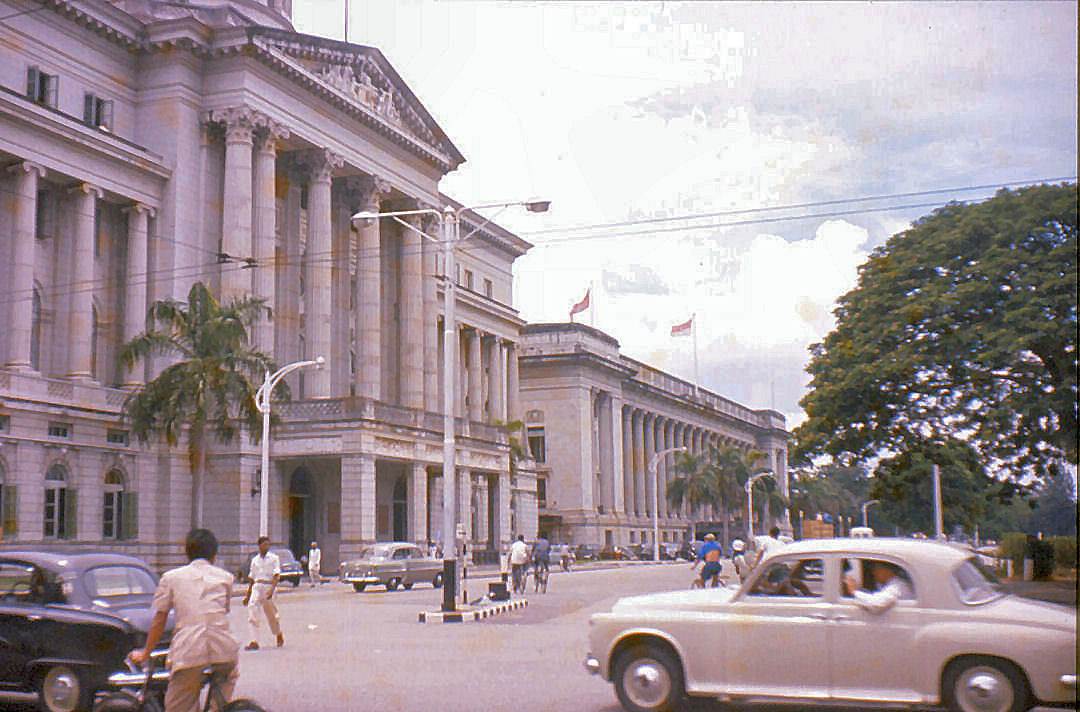
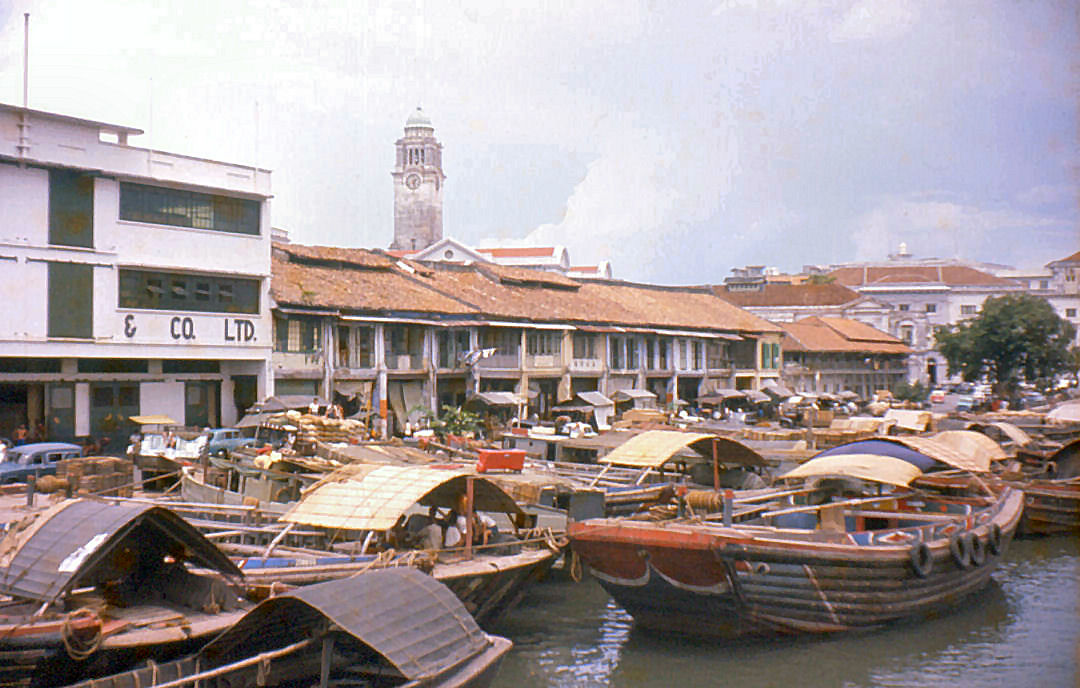
- View of the Singapore River, 1960 Victoria Theatre and Memorial Hall, 1965 High Street, 1963 Raffles Hotel, 1965 Supreme Court and City Hall buildings, 1960 Bumboats on the Singapore River, 1960

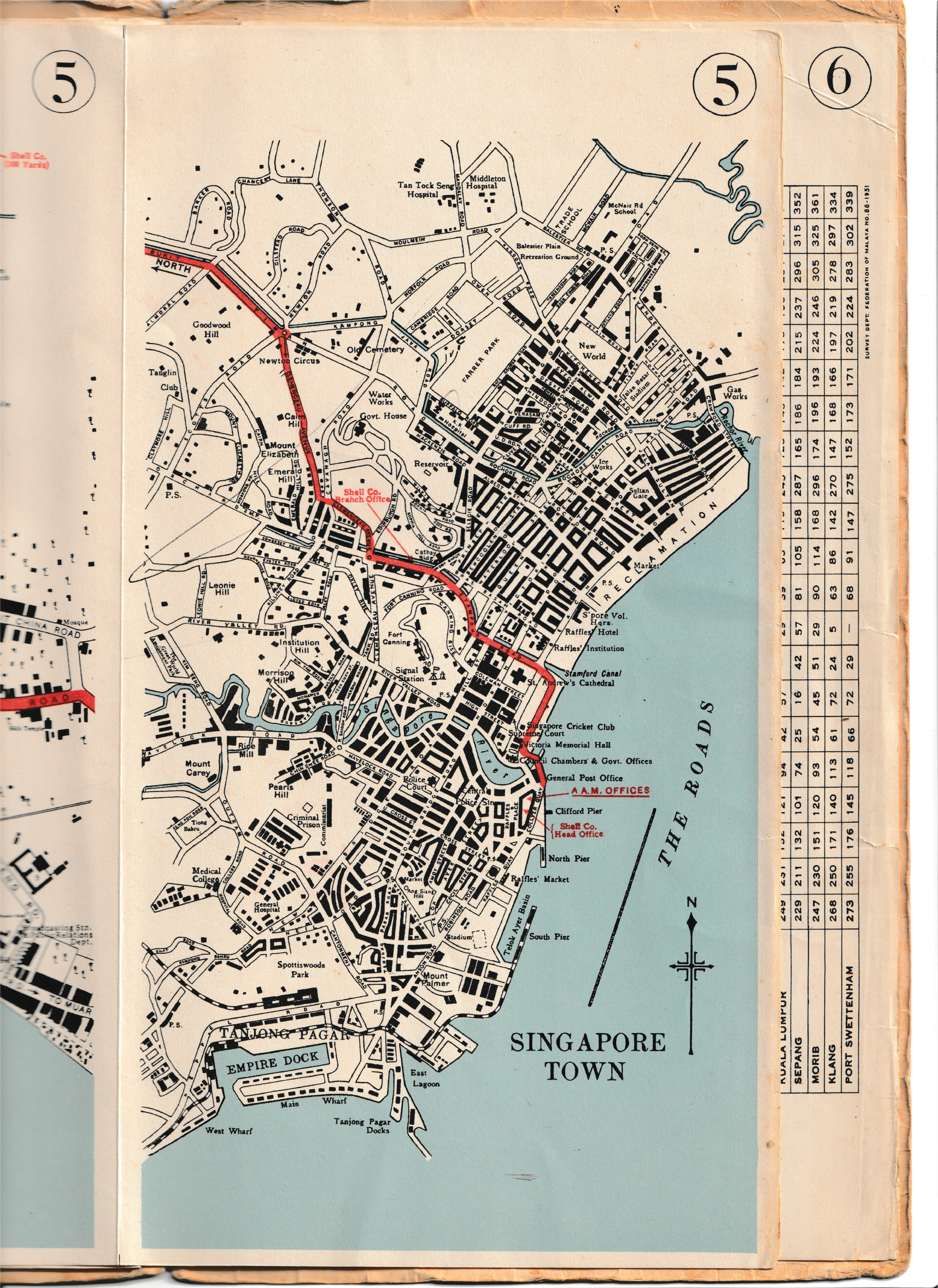
- Map of the area in 1951, the year it was conferred city status.
- Coordinates: 1°17′30″N 103°51′00″E
- Sovereign state: United Kingdom (1826–1963); Malaysia (1963–1965)
- Administrative entity: Colony of Singapore (1951–1959); State of Singapore (1959–1965)

Government
  - Type: City council
  - Mayor: Ong Eng Guan (1957–1959)

Area
  - Total: 6.89 sq mi (17.84 km^{2})
- Demonym: Singaporean
- Time zone: UTC+07:30 (SST)
- Postal districts: 1, 6, 7, 8, 9

The City of Singapore (Note: Malay: Bandaraya Singapura; Chinese: 新加坡市; Tamil: சிங்கப்பூர் நகரம்) was the capital city of the Colony of Singapore, a British crown colony, and later served as the state capital of the State of Singapore within Malaysia, administered by the City Council as its local governing authority. Before 1951, the City Council was known as the Municipal Commission, and the area was referred to as the Town of Singapore. Singapore was formally accorded city status by the United Kingdom in 1951.

The remainder of the crown colony outside the urban boundaries was administered separately by the Singapore Rural Board. The city functioned as the capital of Singapore until its abolishment in 1965. Today, the former city boundary broadly corresponds to the modern Central Area, which sits in the south-eastern corner of the main island.

== History ==
=== Municipal origins and electoral division ===
Local governance in Singapore originated with the establishment of the Municipal Commission in 1856 to oversee basic infrastructure, health, and utilities for the growing commercial port. For early elections under the colonial framework, electoral boundaries were directly mapped onto these municipal divisions. In the 1948 and 1951 legislative elections, constituencies were strictly bifurcated along the borders separating the Municipal Commission and the Rural Board territory.

=== Elevation to City Status (1951) ===
On 22 September 1951, the Town of Singapore was officially elevated to a city under a royal charter from King George VI. The historic declaration ceremony took place on the steps of the Municipal Building facing the Padang, where Governor Franklin Charles Gimson presented the official Letters Patent and royal seal to T. P. F. McNeice, President of the Municipality, before an audience of over 50,000 citizens. Following the proclamation, the Municipal Commission was renamed the City Council of Singapore, and the grand neoclassical Municipal Building was formally renamed City Hall.

=== Jurisdiction and municipal expansion ===
The newly designated City of Singapore encompassed an area of 17.84 square kilometres (6.89 sq mi), covering heavily urbanised sectors around the Singapore River, Orchard, Chinatown, and Kampong Glam. The council held wide statutory responsibilities for essential public works, managing the distribution of electricity, water, gas, gasworks, and sanitation networks, alongside road paving and public street lighting. Physical planning within the boundary, however, was coordinated in tandem with the Singapore Improvement Trust (SIT), which was tasked by 1951 amendments to prepare an island-wide Master Plan to address burgeoning housing deficits.

The City Council quickly became a core political arena. Following local legislative reforms that introduced universal franchise, the 1957 City Council election resulted in a sweeping victory for the anti-colonial People's Action Party (PAP). Ong Eng Guan subsequently assumed office as Singapore's first and only elected Mayor. Under Ong's populist administration, the council altered official procedures, conducting debates in vernacular languages rather than English and making public utilities more accessible to lower-income urban districts.

=== Centralisation and Dissolution (1959–1965) ===
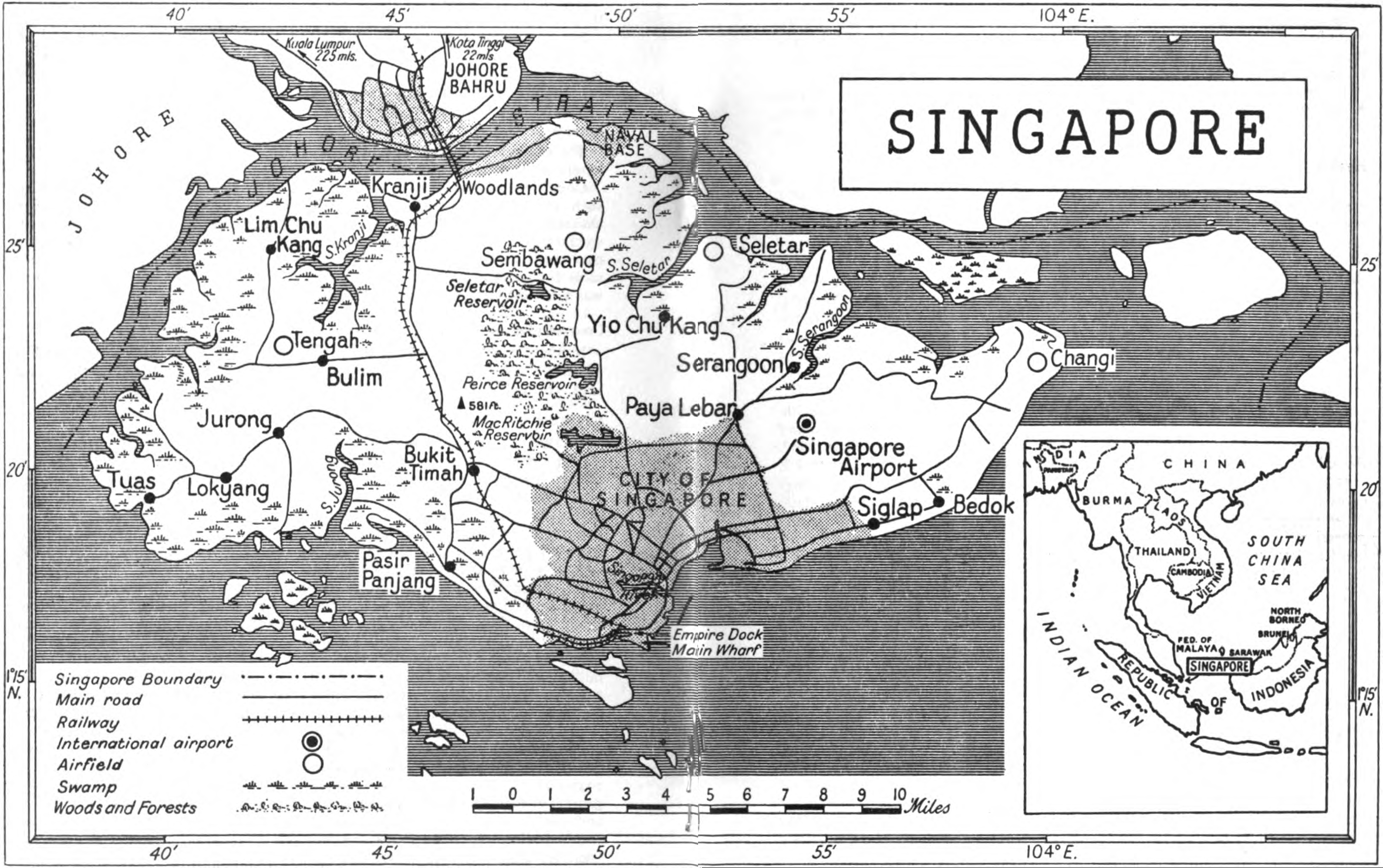
The outline of the city highlighted in a 1959 map of Singapore by the British Information Services.

Following the 1959 general election, the PAP won the central legislative assembly, leading to Singapore attaining internal self-government. To streamline resource allocation, reduce bureaucratic overlap, and avoid friction between the central government and local council leadership, Prime Minister Lee Kuan Yew began phasing out the city's separate administrative layer. Mayor Ong Eng Guan was appointed Minister for National Development, and the City Council’s operational portfolios—including water, electricity, gas, and infrastructure—were progressively transferred directly into statutory boards like the Public Utilities Board (PUB) and national ministries.

Following the separation of Singapore from Malaysia and full independence on 9 August 1965, the city was completely dissolved. The Republic of Singapore Independence Act 1965 formally codified this consolidation, empowering the President to officially dismantle any remaining dualities. The clause specified:

The President may by order make such modifications in any written law as appear to him to be necessary or expedient in consequence of the abolition of the City Council and of the Rural Board and of the assumption of the powers of the local authorities by the Government.

This decree formally abolished both the City Council and the Rural Board, centralising all municipal, civic, and regional planning operations under a unified national civil service.

== Legacy ==
Although the City of Singapore ceased to exist, its historical borders matches closely with the present-day Central Area, with the Central Region as the main metropolitan region surrounding the historic city borders. Architectural monuments from the city era, such as City Hall and the Old Supreme Court Building, remain highly protected national monuments. Today, the title "Singapore" applies comprehensively to the entire nation as a single, centralized city-state.

== See also ==
- British overseas cities
- City status in the United Kingdom
- George Town, Penang
- Victoria, Hong Kong
