= British countries =

Generally, British countries can mean:

- Countries of the United Kingdom
- Countries of the British Empire
