= Territorial evolution of the British Empire =

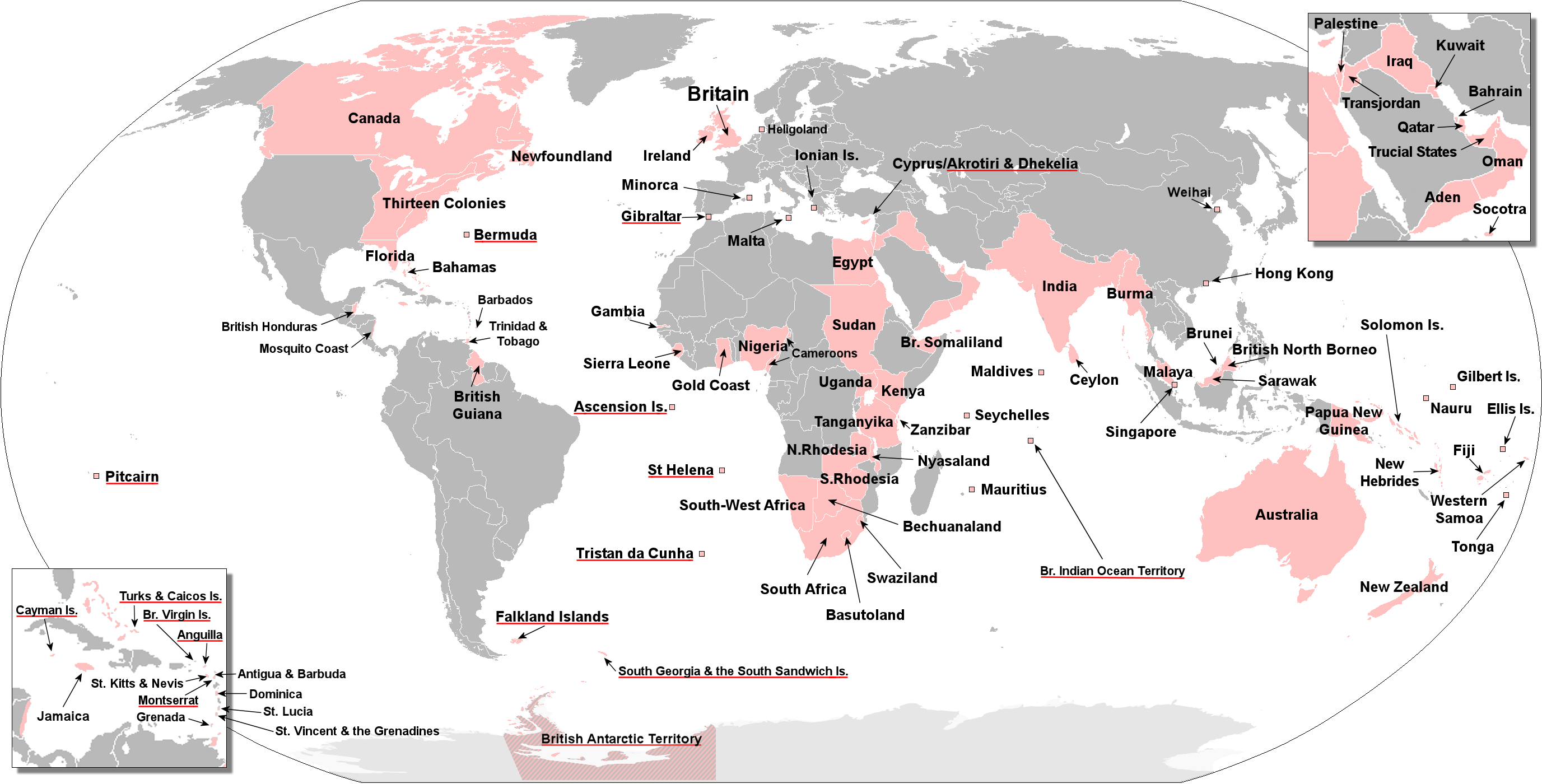
The territories that were, at one time, part of the British Empire. The United Kingdom and its accompanying British Overseas Territories are underlined in red.

The flag of the United Kingdom.

The territorial evolution of the British Empire is considered to have begun with the foundation of the English colonial empire in the late 16th century. Since then, many territories around the world have been under the control of the United Kingdom or its predecessor states. When the Kingdom of Great Britain was formed in 1707 by the union of the Kingdoms of Scotland and England, the latter country's colonial possessions passed to the new state. Similarly, when Great Britain was united with the Kingdom of Ireland in 1801 to form the United Kingdom, control over its colonial possessions passed to the latter state. Collectively, these territories are referred to as the British Empire. When much of Ireland gained independence in 1922 as the Irish Free State, the other territories of the empire remained under the control of the United Kingdom.

From 1714 to 1837, the British throne was held by a series of kings who were also the rulers of the German state of Hanover. However, this was purely a personal union, with Hanover maintaining its political independence otherwise, and so it is not usually considered to have formed part of the British Empire.

The nature of the territories (and peoples) ruled as part of the British Empire varied enormously. In legal terms the territories included those formally under the sovereignty of the British monarch (who held the additional title of Emperor/Empress of India from 1876 to 1947); various "foreign" territories controlled as protectorates; territories transferred to British administration under the authority of the League of Nations or the United Nations; and miscellaneous other territories, such as the Anglo-Egyptian Sudan, a condominium with Egypt. No uniform system of government was applied to any of these.

Several countries (dominions) within the British Empire gained independence in stages during the earlier part of the 20th century. Much of the rest of the empire was dismantled in the twenty years following the end of the Second World War, starting with the independence of India and Pakistan in 1947, and continued until the handover of Hong Kong to the People's Republic of China in 1997. There remain, however, fourteen territories around the world known as the British Overseas Territories which remain under the jurisdiction and sovereignty of the United Kingdom.

Many of the former territories of the British Empire are members of the Commonwealth of Nations. Fourteen of these (known, with the United Kingdom, as the 15 Commonwealth realms) retain the British monarch (currently Charles III) as head of state. The British monarch is also Head of the Commonwealth, but this is a purely symbolic and personal title; members of the Commonwealth (including the Commonwealth realms) are fully sovereign states.

At its territorial peak in 1920, the British Empire controlled a total area of over 35,500,000 km^{2} (13,700,000 sq mi) or more than 26% of the Earth's land (excluding Antarctica), the largest empire in the world. At this point, the empire's population was over 449 million. The United Kingdom had about 120 colonies throughout its history, the most colonies in the world; the French colonial empire came second with about 80 colonies.

== Governance ==
The British Empire comprised the dominions, colonies, protectorates, mandates, and other territories ruled or administered by the United Kingdom and its predecessor states. In addition to the areas formally under the sovereignty of the British monarch, various "foreign" territories were controlled as protectorates; territories transferred to British administration under the authority of the League of Nations or the United Nations; and miscellaneous other territories, such as the condominium of Anglo-Egyptian Sudan. The natures of the administration of the Empire changed both by time and place, and there was no uniform system of government in the Empire.

=== Colonies ===
Colonies were territories that were intended to be places of permanent settlement, providing land for their settlers. The Crown claimed absolute sovereignty over them, although they were not formally part of the United Kingdom itself. Generally, their law was the common law of England together with whatever British Acts of Parliament were also applied to them. Over time, a number of colonies were granted "responsible government", making them largely self-governing.

==== Crown Colony ====
A Crown colony: a type of colonial administration of the English and later the British Empire, whose legislature and administration was controlled by the Crown.

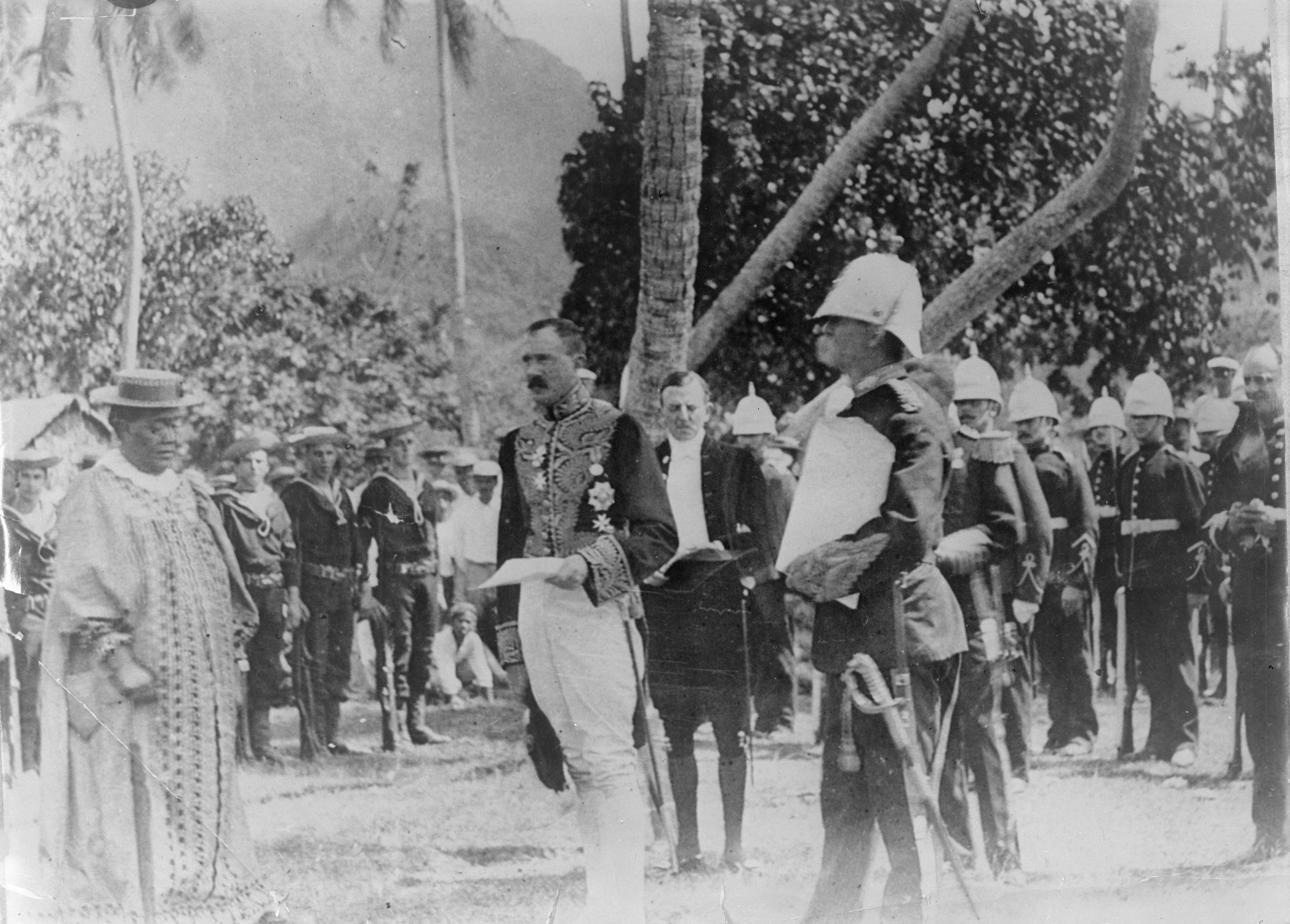
Lord Ranfurly reads the Cook Islands annexation proclamation to Queen Makea on 7 October 1900.

Crown colonies were ruled by a governor appointed by the monarch. By the middle of the 19th century, the sovereign appointed royal governors on the advice of the Secretary of State for the Colonies. This became the main method of creating and governing colonies. Most Crown colonies, especially the white settler colonies had a bicameral legislature, consisting of an upper house usually called the Legislative council, which members were appointed and served a similar purpose as the British House of Lords. There also existed lower houses which were usually named the Legislative Assembly or House of Assembly. The lower house was usually elected, but suffrage was restricted to free white men only, usually with property ownership restrictions. Since land ownership was widespread, most white men could vote. The governor also often had an Executive Council which had a similar function to the Cabinet in England but was not responsible to the colonial lower house. They held a consultative position, however, and did not serve in administrative offices as cabinet ministers do. Members of the Executive Council were not necessarily members of the lower house but were usually members of the upper house. Later as the white colonies gained more internal responsible government, the lower house began to supersede the (usually unelected) upper house as the colonial legislature, and the position of Premier emerged.

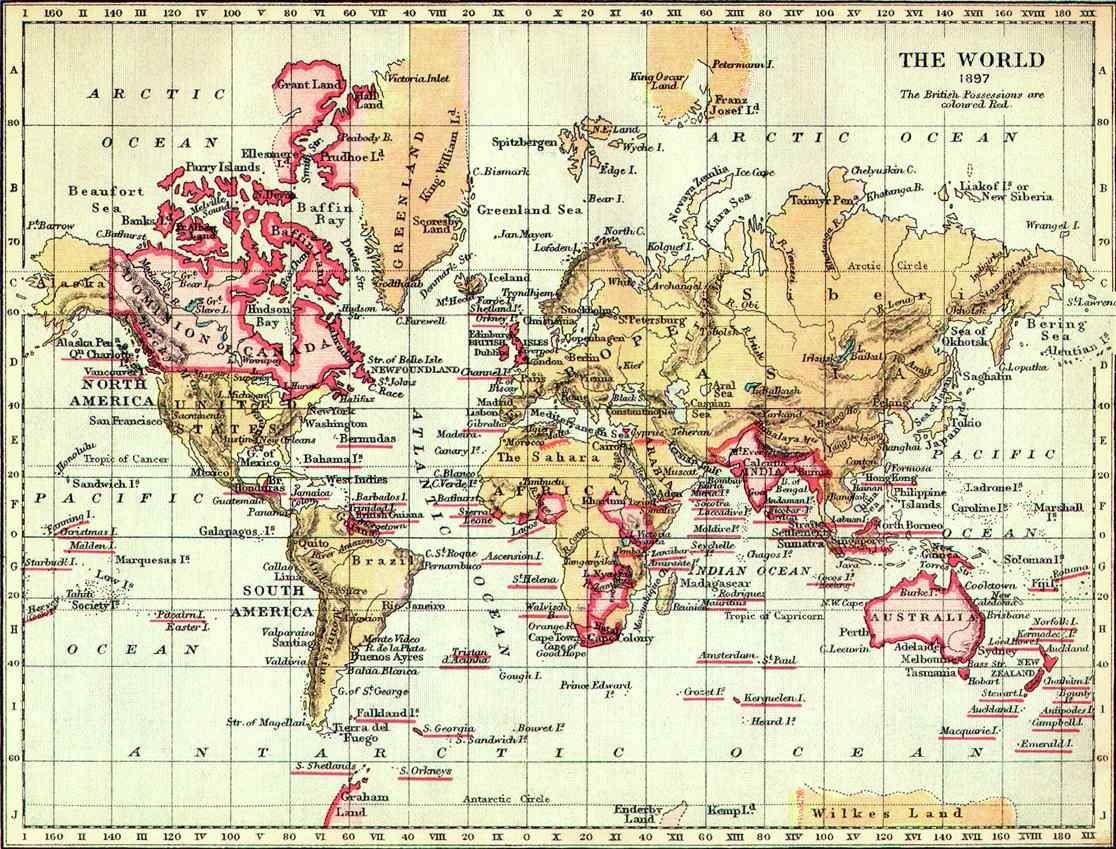
The British Empire in 1897, marked in traditional pink.

==== Charter colony ====
Charter colony is one of the three classes of colonial government established in the 17th-century English colonies in North America. In a charter colony, the King granted a royal charter to the colonial government establishing the rules under which the colony was to be governed and charter colonies elected their own governors based on rules spelled out in the charter or other colonial legislation.

==== Proprietary colony ====
A number of colonies in the 16th and 17th centuries were granted to a particular person; these were known as proprietary colonies. Proprietary colonies in America were governed by a Lord Proprietor, who, holding authority by virtue of a royal charter, usually exercised that authority almost as an independent sovereign. Eventually these were converted to Crown colonies.

==== Chartered company ====
A chartered company is an association formed by investors or shareholders for the purpose of trade, exploration and colonization. Chartered companies were usually formed, incorporated and legitimized under a royal charter. This document set out the terms under which the company could trade, defined its boundaries of influence, and described its rights and responsibilities. Groups of investors formed companies to underwrite and profit from the exploration of Africa, India, Asia, the Caribbean and North America, under the patronage of the state. Some companies like the East India Company (the most famous), the Hudson's Bay Company, and the Royal African Company ruled large colonial possessions. The Hudson's Bay Company took control of the Hudson Bay drainage basin in Canada as Rupert's Land, and the Royal African Company started to ship slaves from West Africa to the Americas in the Atlantic slave trade.

=== Protectorates and protected states ===
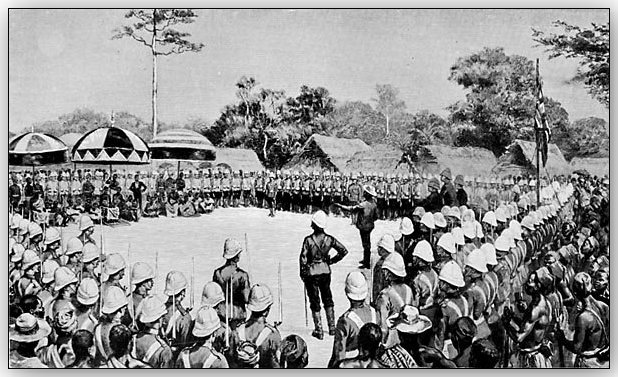
Following the Fourth Anglo-Ashanti War in 1896, the British proclaimed a protectorate over the Ashanti Kingdom.

A protectorate is a territory which is not formally annexed but in which, by treaty, grant or other lawful means, the Crown has power and jurisdiction. A protectorate differs from a "protected state". A protected state is a territory under a foreign ruler which enjoys British protection, over whose foreign affairs she exercises control, but in respect of whose internal affairs she does not exercise jurisdiction.

=== Dominions ===
Dominions were semi-independent polities that were nominally under the Crown, constituting the British Empire and British Commonwealth, beginning in the latter part of the 19th century. The dominions had been previously Crown colonies, and some of the colonies had been united to form dominions such as Union of South Africa and Commonwealth of Australia. The Balfour Declaration of 1926 clarified the status of the dominions, recognizing them as "autonomous Communities within the British Empire, equal in status, in no way subordinate one to another in any aspect of their domestic or external affairs, though united by a common allegiance to the Crown, and freely associated as members of the British Commonwealth of Nations." The Statute of Westminster 1931 converted this status into legal reality, making them essentially independent members of what was then called the British Commonwealth. Initially, the Dominions conducted their own trade policy, some limited foreign relations, and had autonomous armed forces, although the British government claimed and exercised the exclusive power to declare wars. However, after the passage of the Statute of Westminster, the language of dependency on the Crown of the United Kingdom ceased, and the Crown itself was no longer referred to as the Crown of any place in particular but simply as "the Crown". Arthur Berriedale Keith, in Speeches and Documents on the British Dominions 1918–1931, stated that "the Dominions are sovereign international States in the sense that the King in respect of each of His Dominions (Newfoundland excepted) is such a State in the eyes of international law". After then, those countries that were previously referred to as "Dominions" became Commonwealth realms where the sovereign reigns no longer as the British monarch, but as monarch of each nation in its own right, and are considered equal to the United Kingdom and one another.

=== Mandates ===
Mandates were forms of territory created after the end of the First World War. A number of German colonies and protectorates and Ottoman provinces were held as mandates by the United Kingdom (Tanganyika, British Cameroons, Togoland, Palestine and Mesopotamia); and its dominions of Australia (New Guinea, Nauru), New Zealand (Western Samoa), and South Africa (South West Africa). These territories were governed on behalf of the League of Nations for the benefit of their inhabitants. Most converted to United Nations Trust Territories in 1946.

=== India (British Raj) ===
The British Raj was the imperial political structure in the Indian subcontinent between 1858 and 1947, comprising British India (a Crown colony, made up of presidencies and provinces directly governed by the British Crown through the Viceroy and Governor-General of India) and other princely states, governed by Indian princes, under the suzerainty of the British Crown exercised through the Viceroy and Governor-General of India.

== British Overseas territories ==
Within twenty years of the partition and independence in 1947 of India, most of the Empire's territories had achieved full independence. As of 2026, fourteen former colonies (since 2002 known as British Overseas Territories) remain under British rule.

Following the agreement to transfer the Chagos Archipelago (British Indian Ocean Territory) to Mauritius, the UK government is also due to introduce legislation to implement the agreement, including amending the British Nationality Act 1981 to reflect that the British Indian Ocean Territory is no longer an overseas territory following Parliament's ratification of the treaty.

Most of the British Overseas Territories are islands (or groups of islands) with a small population; some are in very remote areas of the world. Of the territories with a permanent population, all have at least some degree of internal self-government, with the United Kingdom retaining responsibility for defence and external relations.

The fourteen British Overseas Territories are:

- Anguilla
- Bermuda
- British Antarctic Territory
- British Indian Ocean Territory
- British Virgin Islands
- Cayman Islands
- Falkland Islands
- Gibraltar
- Montserrat
- Pitcairn Islands
- Saint Helena, Ascension and Tristan da Cunha
- South Georgia and the South Sandwich Islands
- Sovereign Base Areas of Akrotiri and Dhekelia
- Turks and Caicos Islands

== List of territories that were once a part of the British Empire ==
=== Legend ===
!±!	Crown dependency	United Kingdom Flag	Part of the United Kingdom
:±:	Commonwealth realm, with King Charles III as head of state	Turks and Caicos Flag	Overseas territories
£IMP	Currency pegged to the GBP	CYP	Pound sterling derived currency
!T!	Common law legal system to various extent	[X]	Westminster style parliamentary system
abc	English as a dominant or an official language	/\\/	Left-hand traffic

==== Colour-coding ====
Colour	Description
	Present-day members of the Commonwealth
	Present-day British Overseas Territories
	Crown dependencies

=== Africa ===
British Africa

Name of territory	Dates	Status	Comments
Ashanti	1901–1957	Colony	Became a part of the dominion of Ghana
Basutoland	1868	Protectorate	Wanted to join the Cape Colony, but was authorized to join the Colony of Natal instead. Eventually was placed under direct authority of the High Commissioner for South Africa.
Basutoland	1871	Annexed to Cape Colony	
Basutoland	1884	Colony	
Basutoland	1965	Self-governing colony	
Basutoland	1966	Independent as Lesotho	
Bechuanaland Protectorate	1884–1965	Protectorate	Resident Commissioner assigned 1884, but Protectorate status declared after treaties with several chiefs were signed in 1885
Bechuanaland Protectorate	1965–66	Self-governing protectorate	
Bechuanaland Protectorate	1966	Independent as Botswana	
Bight of Benin	1852–1861	Protectorate	
Bight of Benin	1861	United with Bight of Biafra	
Bight of Biafra	1849–1861	Protectorate	
Bight of Biafra	1861	United with Bight of Benin	
Bights of Biafra and Benin	1861–1891	Protectorate	
British Bechuanaland (see also under "Bechuanaland")	1885–1895	Crown colony	
British Bechuanaland (see also under "Bechuanaland")	1895	Incorporated into Cape Colony	Now a part of the Northern Cape and North West provinces of South Africa
British Cameroons	1916–1919	Occupation	
British Cameroons	1919–1946	League of Nations mandated territory	
British Cameroons	1946–1961	United Nations Trust Territory	
British Cameroons	1961	Northern part merged into Nigeria, southern part into the Republic of Cameroon	
British East Africa	1888–1895	Territory leased to the Imperial British East Africa Company (IBEAC) by the Sultan of Zanzibar	
British East Africa	1895–1920	Protectorate	Territory included former IBEAC territories and the strip of Sultan of Zanizbar's dominions on the coast of Kenya which fell within the British sphere of influence
British East Africa	1920	Became the Colony and Protectorate of Kenya	Lands of Sultan of Zanzibar on coast administered with the Colony as one unit
British Somaliland	1884–1960	Protectorate	
British Somaliland	1960	Independent as State of Somaliland	After 5 days merged with the Trust Territory of Somaliland as Somali Republic, in 1991 independent as Somaliland (unrecognised)
Cape Colony	1806–1910	Colony	Became a province of the Union of South Africa as the "Cape of Good Hope"
Chinde	1891–1923	Concession	Anglo-Portuguese Treaty of 1891 gives Britain a 99-year lease, enabling river steamers to sail to the British Central Africa Protectorate, later Nyasaland
Chinde	1923	Returned to Portuguese East Africa	Concession abandoned due to erosion, cyclone damage, and development of the port of Beira as a better alternative
Egypt	1801–03	Occupation	
Egypt	1882–1914	Occupation	
Egypt	1914–1922	Protectorate	
Egypt	1922	Independence	
Bioko	1827–1855	Leased territory	Island leased from Spain so that Royal Navy could undertake anti-slavery operations on West Coast of Africa. Main settlement was Port Clarence now known as Malabo
Gambia Colony and Protectorate	1816–1965	Colony	Protectorate declared over hinterland of Gambia River in 1894
Gambia Colony and Protectorate	1965	Independence	
Gold Coast	1874–1957	Colony	
Gold Coast	1957	Independent as Ghana	Also incorporated British Togoland by plebiscite
Kenya, Colony & Protectorate of	1920–1963	Colony	Previously part of British East Africa
Kenya, Colony & Protectorate of	1963	Independence	
Lagos Protectorate	1887–1906	Protectorate, governed from the Lagos Colony	
Lagos Protectorate	1906	Incorporated into the Protectorate of Southern Nigeria	
Southern Nigeria Protectorate	1900–1906	Protectorate, created from Niger Coast Protectorate and territories of the Royal Niger Company	
Southern Nigeria Protectorate	1906	Incorporated the Lagos Colony to be the Colony and Protectorate of Southern Nigeria	
Libya, regions of Cyrenicia & Tripolitania only	1942–1946	British Military administration in Cyrenicia & Tripolitania	
Libya, regions of Cyrenicia & Tripolitania only	1946–1951	Italian forces expelled, UN trusteeship of Cyrenicia & Tripolitania, administered by Britain	Fezzan region administered by France under trusteeship
Libya, regions of Cyrenicia & Tripolitania only	1951	Independent as the Kingdom of Libya	
Natal	1843–1910	Colony	
Natal	1910	Became a province of the Union of South Africa	Now part of the province of KwaZulu-Natal, South Africa
Niger Districts	1885–1899	Protectorate under the Royal Niger Company	
Niger Districts	1900	Became part of Northern Nigeria	
Colony and Protectorate of Nigeria	1914–1954		Created from the Colony & Protectorate of Southern Nigeria and the Protectorate of Northern Nigeria
Colony and Protectorate of Nigeria	1954	Became the self-governing Federation of Nigeria	
Federation of Nigeria	1954–1960	Autonomous federation	Formed from the Colony and Protectorate of Nigeria
Federation of Nigeria	1960	Independence	until 1963 was a realm/dominion
Northern Nigeria	1900–1914	Protectorate governed by the Colony of Southern Nigeria	
Northern Nigeria	1914	Merged with Protectorate of Southern Nigeria to form the Colony and Protectorate of Nigeria	
Northern Territories of the Gold Coast	1901–1957	Protectorate	Annexed to form part of Her Majesty's dominions as part of the dominion of Ghana
Nyasaland known as the Nyasaland Districts until 1893, and then British Central Africa until 1907	1891–1964	Protectorate	
Nyasaland known as the Nyasaland Districts until 1893, and then British Central Africa until 1907	1964	Independent as Malawi	
Orange River Colony	1900–1910	Colony	
Orange River Colony	1907	Granted responsible government	
Orange River Colony	1910	Became the Province of the Orange Free State in the Union of South Africa	
Rhodesia	1964-1965		Now Zimbabwe
Matabeleland	1888–1894	Protectorate under British South Africa Company (BSAC)	
Matabeleland	1894	United with Mashonaland as South Zambezia in 1894	
Mashonaland	1889–1894	Protectorate under BSAC	
Mashonaland	1894	United with Matabeleland as South Zambezia in 1894	
South Zambezia	1894–95	Protectorate under BSAC	
South Zambezia	1895	United with North Zambezia as Rhodesia	
Rhodesia	1895–1901	Protectorate under BSAC	
Rhodesia	1901	Mashonaland and Matabeleland united as Southern Rhodesia	
Northern Rhodesia	1911–1924	Protectorate under BSAC	Amalgamation of Barotziland-North-Western Rhodesia and North-Eastern Rhodesia
Northern Rhodesia	1924–1953	Protectorate	
Northern Rhodesia	1953–1963	Part of Federation of Rhodesia and Nyasaland	
Northern Rhodesia	1964	Independent as Zambia	
Southern Rhodesia	1901–1923	Protectorate under BSAC	
Southern Rhodesia	1923—1953	Self-governing colony	
Southern Rhodesia	1953–1963	Part of Federation of Rhodesia and Nyasaland	
Southern Rhodesia	1964–65	Self-governing colony	
Rhodesia	1965–1970	Unilateral declaration of independence, with Elizabeth II as head of state	Not internationally recognised
Rhodesia	1970–1979	Republic	Not internationally recognised
Zimbabwe-Rhodesia	1979	Interim state	
Zimbabwe-Rhodesia	1979–80	Crown colony	
Zimbabwe-Rhodesia	1980	Independent as Zimbabwe	
Sierra Leone Colony and Protectorate	1787–1808	Freed slave colony organised by Sierra Leone Company	
Sierra Leone Colony and Protectorate	1808–1821	Crown colony	
Sierra Leone Colony and Protectorate	1821–1850	Part of British West African Settlements	
Sierra Leone Colony and Protectorate	1850–1866	Crown colony	
Sierra Leone Colony and Protectorate	1866–1888	Part of British West African Settlements	
Sierra Leone Colony and Protectorate	1888–1895	Colony	
Sierra Leone Colony and Protectorate	1896–1961	Colony and protectorate	
Sierra Leone Colony and Protectorate	1961	Independence	
South Africa, Union of	1910–1961	Dominion	Formed by the federation of the Cape, Natal, Orange River, and Transvaal colonies
South Africa, Union of	1961	Republic	Not a member of the Commonwealth between 1961 and 1994
Sudan, Anglo-Egyptian	1899–1952	Condominium with Egypt	
Sudan, Anglo-Egyptian	1952–1956	Self-rule	
Sudan, Anglo-Egyptian	1956	Independent as Republic of Sudan	
Swaziland	1902–67	Protectorate	
Swaziland	1967–68	Protected State	
Swaziland	1968	Independence	
Tangier	1661	Ceded to England by Portugal	
Tangier	1684	Abandoned by England	
Tangier International Zone	1924	Established as condominium between UK, France and Spain (later also Portugal, US, Italy, Belgium, Sweden and the Netherlands)	
Tangier International Zone	1940–1945	Spanish occupation	
Tangier International Zone	1956	Zone dissolved, Tangier returned to Morocco	
German East Africa	1916–1922	Occupation	
Tanganyika Territory	1922–1946	League of Nations mandated territory	
Tanganyika Territory	1946–1961	United Nations Trust Territory under Britain	
Tanganyika Territory	1961	Independence	Merged with Zanzibar in 1964 to form Tanzania
Tati Concessions Land	1872–1893	Concession	
Tati Concessions Land	1893	Detached from Matabeleland	
Tati Concessions Land	1893–1911	Under protectorate of Bechuanaland	
Tati Concessions Land	1911	Annexed to Bechuanaland	
British Togoland	1914–1916	Occupation	Western half of erstwhile German Togoland occupied by both British and French forces 1914–16
British Togoland	1916–1922	Administered by British only	
British Togoland	1922–1946	League of Nations Mandate under Britain	
British Togoland	1946–1957	United Nations Trust Territory under Britain	
British Togoland	1957	Independence	Merged with Ghana upon independence after plebiscite
(French) Togoland	1914–16	occupation	Eastern half of erstwhile German Togoland occupied by both British and French forces, then after 1916 administered by France only. In 1922, became LoN Mandate, then UN Trust Territory in 1946, also under France. Now the Republic of Togo since independence in 1960.
Transvaal	1877–1884	Colony	
Transvaal	1884–1900	Independent as South African Republic	
Transvaal	1900–1906	Colony	
Transvaal	1906–1910	Self-governing colony	
Transvaal	1910	Part of Union of South Africa	Now divided between the provinces of Gauteng, Limpopo, Mpumalanga and North West in South Africa
Uganda	1890–1893	Occupied by British East Africa Company	
Uganda	1893–94	Provisional protectorate	
Uganda	1894–1962	Protectorate	
Uganda	1962	Self-government	
Uganda	1962	Independence	
Walvis Bay	1795–1878	Occupation	
Walvis Bay	1878–1884	Protectorate	
Walvis Bay	1884	Part of Cape Colony	Now part of Namibia
Zanzibar	1890–1963	Protectorate	
Zanzibar	1963	Independence	Merged with Tanganyika in 1964 to form Tanzania
Zululand	1887–1897	Crown colony	
Zululand	1897	Incorporation into Colony of Natal	Now part of the province of KwaZulu-Natal, South Africa

=== North America ===
Name of territory	Dates	Status	Comments
Assiniboia	1812–1836	Colony	
Assiniboia	1836	Reverted to control of the Hudson's Bay Company	Now part of the province of Manitoba, Canada
Avalon	1623–1637	Palatinate	
Avalon	1637	Incorporated into Newfoundland	
Bristol's Hope	1618–1631	Colony	
Bristol's Hope	1631	Abandoned and later as Newfoundland	
British Columbia	1858–1871	Colony	
British Columbia	1871	Incorporated into Canada	
Canada, Dominion of	Dominion (1867–present)	Formed by the federation of the provinces of Canada, New Brunswick, and Nova Scotia	1982 – Constitution Act, 1982, making Canada's constitution unmodifiable by the British Parliament.; Several provinces and territories have joined since Confederation.
Canada, Lower	1791–1841	Province (colony)	Now the southern half of the province of Quebec, Canada
Canada, Lower	1841	Merged with Upper Canada to form the Province of Canada	Re-established within the Dominion of Canada as the province of Quebec in 1867
Canada, province of	1841–1867	Colony	Formed by the amalgamation of the provinces of Lower and Upper Canada
Canada, province of	1867	Joined the Dominion of Canada as the provinces of Ontario and Quebec	(Now the southern halves of Ontario and Quebec)
Upper Canada	1791–1841	Province (colony)	Ontario, Canada
Upper Canada	1841	Merged with Lower Canada to form the Province of Canada	Re-established within the Dominion of Canada as the province of Ontario in 1867
Cape Breton Island	1763	Incorporated into Nova Scotia	Previously under French sovereignty
Cape Breton Island	1784	Colony	Separated from Nova Scotia
Cape Breton Island	1820	Re-incorporated into Nova Scotia	
Carolina	1663	Proprietary colony	
Carolina	1729	Formally divided into Crown colonies of North & South Carolina	
Carolina, North	1729	Crown colony	
Carolina, North	1776	Signed unilateral Declaration of Independence as the state of North Carolina	
Carolina, North	1783	Sovereignty formally relinquished by Great Britain	
Carolina, South	1729	Crown colony	
Carolina, South	1776	Declared independent as the state of South Carolina	
Carolina, South	1783	Sovereignty formally relinquished by Great Britain	
Connecticut	1636	Colony	Later incorporated the unchartered Saybrook Colony (1635–44) and New Haven Colony (1638–65)
Connecticut	1776	Declared independent as the state of Connecticut	
Connecticut	1783	Sovereignty formally relinquished by Great Britain	
Cuper's Cove	1610–1621	Colony	
Cuper's Cove	1621	Abandoned and later as Newfoundland	
East Florida	1763–1783	Colony	
East Florida	1783	Returned to Spanish sovereignty	Now part of the state of Florida, United States
Georgia	1732	Proprietary colony	
Georgia	1755	Crown colony	
Georgia	1776	Signed unilateral Declaration of Independence as the state of Georgia	
Georgia	1783	Sovereignty formally relinquished by Great Britain	
Massachusetts Bay	1629	Colony	
Massachusetts Bay	1691	United with Plymouth Colony	
New Brunswick	1784	Colony	Separated from Nova Scotia
New Brunswick	1867	Became a province of Canada	
New Hampshire	1641	Became part of Massachusetts Bay Colony	
New Hampshire	1679	Separate colony	
New Hampshire	1686	Became a province of Dominion of New England	
New Hampshire	1691	Separate colony	
New Hampshire	1776	Signed unilateral Declaration of Independence as the state of New Hampshire	
New Hampshire	1783	Sovereignty formally relinquished by Great Britain	
New Jersey	1664–1673	Proprietary Colony	Formed from portions of New Netherland and New Sweden
New Jersey	1673–1702	Divided into separate colonies of East and West Jersey	
New Jersey	1702	Royal colony	East & West Jersey re-unified
New Jersey	1776	Signed unilateral Declaration of Independence as the state of New Jersey	
New Jersey	1783	Sovereignty formally relinquished by Great Britain	
New York	1664–1685	Proprietary colony	Formed after conquest of New Netherland
New York	1685–1776	Royal Province	
New York	1776	Signed unilateral Declaration of Independence as the state of New York	
New York	1783	Sovereignty formally relinquished by Great Britain	
Newfoundland	1497–1583	Claimed by England	
Newfoundland	1583–1818	Colony	
Newfoundland	1818–1907	Crown colony	
Newfoundland	1907–1949	Dominion	
Newfoundland	1934–1949	Commission of Government	Self-rule suspended, de jure Dominion by Royal prerogative
Newfoundland	1949	Became a province of Canada	Now known as Newfoundland and Labrador
North-Western Territory	1859–1871		
North-Western Territory	1870	Incorporated into the Northwest Territories of Canada	Now divided between the Canadian provinces of Alberta, British Columbia and Saskatchewan and territories of Northwest Territories, Nunavut and Yukon
Nova Scotia	1621–1632	Scottish colony	
Nova Scotia	1654–1670	English occupation	
Nova Scotia	1713	Colony	
Nova Scotia	1848	Granted responsible government	
Nova Scotia	1867	Became a province of Canada	
Oregon Country	1818–1846	Condominium with the United States	Divided 1846 by Oregon Treaty between United Kingdom and United States. UK received territory north of 49th Parallel (modern British Columbia), US received land south of 49th Parallel (modern Washington (State), Oregon, Idaho, and western parts of both Montana and Wyoming).
Prince Edward Island known as New Ireland until 1769, and as St. John's Island until 1799	1744–1748	Occupation	
Prince Edward Island known as New Ireland until 1769, and as St. John's Island until 1799	1758–1763	Occupation	
Prince Edward Island known as New Ireland until 1769, and as St. John's Island until 1799	1763–1769	Part of Nova Scotia	
Prince Edward Island known as New Ireland until 1769, and as St. John's Island until 1799	1769–1873	Colony	
Prince Edward Island known as New Ireland until 1769, and as St. John's Island until 1799	1873	Became a province of Canada	
Quebec	1763–1791	Province (colony)	Nominally included territory that is now part of the provinces of Ontario and Quebec in Canada, and (until 1783) the states of Illinois, Indiana, Michigan, Minnesota, Ohio and Wisconsin in the United States
Quebec	1791	Divided into the provinces of Lower Canada and Upper Canada	
Renews	1610–1623	Colony	Abandoned and later became part of Newfoundland
Rupert's Land	1670–1870	possession of Hudson's Bay Company	Nominally included territory that is now part of the Canadian territories and provinces of Alberta, Manitoba, Northwest Territories, Nunavut, Ontario, Saskatchewan and Quebec, and (until 1818) parts of the US states of Minnesota, North Dakota and South Dakota
Rupert's Land	1870	Incorporated into Canada	
South Falkland	1623–1626	Colony	Abandoned and later became part of Newfoundland
Stikine Territory	1862–1863		Now divided between British Columbia and Yukon, Canada
Vancouver Island	1849–1866	Crown colony	
Vancouver Island	1866	Merged into the colony of British Columbia	Now part of the province of British Columbia, Canada
Virginia	1607	Proprietary colony	
Virginia	1624	Crown colony	
Virginia	1776	Declared independent as the state of Virginia	
Virginia	1783	Sovereignty formally relinquished by Great Britain	
West Florida	1763–1783	Colony	
West Florida	1783	Southern part returned to Spanish sovereignty; sovereignty of northern part formally relinquished by Great Britain	Now part of the states of Florida, Louisiana, Mississippi, and Alabama, United States

=== Central America and the Caribbean ===
Name of territory	Dates	Status	Comments
Anguilla	1650–1696	Colony under St. Christopher	
Anguilla	1696–1816	Part of colony of Leeward Islands	
Anguilla	1816–1832	Part of colony of St. Christopher, Nevis, Anguilla, and the British Virgin Islands	
Anguilla	1832–1871	Part of colony of Leeward Islands as colony of St. Christopher, Nevis, Anguilla, and the British Virgin Islands	
Anguilla	1871–1882	Part of the presidency of Saint Christopher (within the Leeward Islands)	
Anguilla	1882–1956	Part of the presidency of Saint Christopher and Nevis (within the Leeward Islands)	
Anguilla	1956–1967	Part of Saint Christopher-Nevis-Anguilla	
Anguilla	1967–1969	Unilateral declaration of independence as Republic of Anguilla	
Anguilla	1969–1980	Part of Saint Christopher-Nevis-Anguilla	
Anguilla	1980–1982	Self-governing colony	
Anguilla	1983–2002	Dependent territory	
Anguilla	2002–present	British Overseas Territory	(Anguilla)
Antigua (incl. Barbuda from 1860)	1632–1671	Colony	
Antigua (incl. Barbuda from 1860)	1671–72	Part of colony of Leeward Islands	
Antigua (incl. Barbuda from 1860)	1672–1816	Part of colony of Leeward Islands	
Antigua (incl. Barbuda from 1860)	1816–1832	Part of colony of Antigua-Barbuda-Montserrat	
Antigua (incl. Barbuda from 1860)	1832–33	Colony	
Antigua (incl. Barbuda from 1860)	1833–1871	Part of colony of Leeward Islands	
Antigua (incl. Barbuda from 1860)	1871–1956	Presidency within the Leeward Islands	
Antigua (incl. Barbuda from 1860)	1956–1958	Colony	
Antigua (incl. Barbuda from 1860)	1958–1962	Province of West Indies Federation	
Antigua (incl. Barbuda from 1860)	1962–1967	Colony	
Antigua (incl. Barbuda from 1860)	1967–1981	Associated state	
Antigua (incl. Barbuda from 1860)	1981	Independent as Antigua and Barbuda	
Antigua-Barbuda-Montserrat	1816–1832	Colony	
Antigua-Barbuda-Montserrat	1832	Dissolved	
Bahamas	1670–1684	Proprietary colony	
Bahamas	1684	Occupied by Spain	
Bahamas	1718–1964	Crown colony	
Bahamas	1964–1969	Self-government	
Bahamas	1969–1973	Commonwealth	
Bahamas	1973	Independence	
Barbados	1624–1627	Claimed by England	
Barbados	1627–1652	Proprietary colony	
Barbados	1652–1663	Colony	
Barbados	1663–1833	Crown colony	
Barbados	1833–1885	Part of colony of Windward Islands	
Barbados	1885–1958	Colony	
Barbados	1958–1962	Province of West Indies Federation	
Barbados	1962–1966	Colony	
Barbados	1966	Independence	
Barbuda	1628–1832	Colony	
Barbuda	1632–1671	Dependency of Antigua	
Barbuda	1671–1816	Part of colony of Leeward Islands	
Barbuda	1816–1832	Part of colony of Antigua-Barbuda-Montserrat	
Barbuda	1832–33	Colony	
Barbuda	1833–1860	Part of colony of Leeward Islands	
Barbuda	1860	Annexed to Antigua	
Barbuda	1976–1980	Autonomous	
Barbuda	1980	Unilateral declaration of independence	–
Barbuda	1981	Independence as part of Antigua and Barbuda	
Bay Islands	1643–early 18th century	Sporadic, short-lived settlements	
Bay Islands	1742–1748	Colony of Port Royal (Roatan). Spanish sovereignty recognized in 1748	
Bay Islands	1749–1782	Illegal but well-established English settlements. Spanish occupation and expulsion of settlers in 1782	
Bay Islands	1852–1860	Colony of the Bay Islands. Surrendered to Honduras in 1860	
Belize – see under "British Honduras"
British Honduras	1665–1742	Settlement	
British Honduras	1742–1840	Settlement subordinated to Jamaica	
British Honduras	1840–1862	Colony subordinated to Jamaica	
British Honduras	1862–1884	Crown colony subordinated to Jamaica	
British Honduras	1884–1954	Crown colony	
British Honduras	1954–1964	Autonomy	
British Honduras	1964–1981	Self-governing colony	
British Honduras	1973	Renamed "Belize"	
British Honduras	1981	Independence	
British Virgin Islands	1666–1672	Occupation	
British Virgin Islands	1672–1713	Part of colony of Leeward Islands as part of Antigua	
British Virgin Islands	1713–1816	Crown colony part of colony of Leeward Islands	
British Virgin Islands	1816–1832	Part of colony of St. Christopher, Nevis, Anguilla, and the British Virgin Islands	
British Virgin Islands	1832–1871	Part of colony of Leeward Islands as colony of St. Christopher, Nevis, Anguilla, and the British Virgin Islands	
British Virgin Islands	1871–1956	Presidency within the Leeward Islands	
British Virgin Islands	1956–1960	Part of territory of Leeward Islands	
British Virgin Islands	1960–1967	Colony	
British Virgin Islands	1967–1982	Self-governing colony	
British Virgin Islands	1983–2002	Dependent territory	
British Virgin Islands	2002–present	British Overseas Territory	(British Virgin Islands)
Cayman Islands	1670–1958	Colony; administered from Jamaica	
Cayman Islands	1958–1962	Province of West Indies Federation	
Cayman Islands	1962–1982	Crown colony	
Cayman Islands	1983–2002	Dependent territory	
Cayman Islands	2002–present	British Overseas Territory	(Cayman Islands)
Dominica	1763–1778	Occupation	
Dominica	1778	Ceded to France	
Dominica	1784–1871	Colony	
Dominica	1871–1939	Presidency within the Leeward Islands	
Dominica	1940–1958	Colony within the Windward Islands	
Dominica	1958–1962	Province of West Indies Federation	
Dominica	1962–1967	Colony	
Dominica	1967–1978	Associated state	
Dominica	1978	Independence	
Grenada	1762–63	Occupation	
Grenada	1763–1779	Part of colony of South Caribbean Islands	
Grenada	1779	Occupied by France	
Grenada	1783–1802	Part of colony of South Caribbean Islands	
Grenada	1802–1833	Colony	
Grenada	1833–1958	Part of Windward Islands	
Grenada	1958–1962	Province of West Indies Federation	
Grenada	1962–1967	Colony	
Grenada	1967–1974	Associated state	
Grenada	1974	Independence	
Old Providence	1628–1630	Initial settlement by English colonists	
Old Providence	1630–1641	Chartered colony under the Providence Island Company	
Old Providence	1641	Captured by Spain, became part of New Granada	
Jamaica	1655–1670	Occupation	
Jamaica	1670–1953	Colony	
Jamaica	1953–1958	Self-governing colony	
Jamaica	1958–1962	Province of West Indies Federation	
Jamaica	1962	Independence	Dominion
Leeward Islands	1671–1816	Colony	
Leeward Islands	1833–1871	Colony	
Leeward Islands	1871–1956	Federal colony	Comprised the presidencies of Antigua (incl. Barbuda), Dominica (to 1939), Montserrat, Nevis, Saint Kitts (incl. Anguilla, and combined with Nevis in 1883), and the Virgin Islands
Leeward Islands	1956–1960	Territory	
Leeward Islands	1960	Dissolved	
Montserrat	1632–1667	Colony part of Antigua	
Montserrat	1667	Occupied by France	
Montserrat	1668–1782	Part of colony of Leeward Islands	
Montserrat	1784–1816	Part of colony of Leeward Islands	
Montserrat	1816–1832	Part of colony of Antigua-Barbuda-Montserrat	
Montserrat	1832–33	Colony part of Antigua	
Montserrat	1833–1871	Part of colony of Leeward Islands	
Montserrat	1871–1956	Presidency within the Leeward Islands	
Montserrat	1956–1958	Colony	
Montserrat	1958–1962	Province of West Indies Federation	
Montserrat	1962–1982	Colony	
Montserrat	1983–2002	Dependent territory	
Montserrat	2002–present	British Overseas Territory	(Montserrat)
Mosquito Coast	1668–1786	Protectorate	
Mosquito Coast	1787–1861	Protectorate	
Mosquito Coast	1861	Incorporated into Nicaragua and Honduras	
Nevis	1628–1671	Colony subordinated to Barbados	
Nevis	1671–1701	Part of colony of Leeward Islands	
Nevis	1701–1704	Part of colony of Leeward Islands under Antigua	
Nevis	1704–1816	Part of colony of Leeward Islands	
Nevis	1816–1833	Part of colony of St. Christopher, Nevis, Anguilla, and the British Virgin Islands	
Nevis	1833–1871	Part of Leeward Islands as colony of St. Christopher, Nevis, Anguilla, and the British Virgin Islands	
Nevis	1871–1883	Presidency within the Leeward Islands	
Nevis	1883	Amalgamated with Saint Kitts to form the presidency of Saint Christopher and Nevis (within the Leeward Islands)	
Redonda	1860s–1967	British possession	
Redonda	1967	Dependency of Antigua	
St. Christopher (Saint Kitts)	1623–1666	Colony	
St. Christopher (Saint Kitts)	1666	Occupied by France	
St. Christopher (Saint Kitts)	1671–1701	Part of colony of Leeward Islands	
St. Christopher (Saint Kitts)	1701–1704	Part of colony of Leeward Islands under Antigua	
St. Christopher (Saint Kitts)	1704–1782	Part of colony of Leeward Islands	
St. Christopher (Saint Kitts)	1782	Occupied by France	
St. Christopher (Saint Kitts)	1783–1816	Part of colony of Leeward Islands	
St. Christopher (Saint Kitts)	1816–1833	Part of colony of St. Christopher, Nevis, Anguilla, and the British Virgin Islands	
St. Christopher (Saint Kitts)	1833–1871	Part of Leeward Islands as colony of St. Christopher, Nevis, Anguilla, and the British Virgin Islands	
St. Christopher (Saint Kitts)	1871–1882	Part of colony of Leeward Islands	
St. Christopher (Saint Kitts)	1882	Amalgamated with Nevis to form the presidency of Saint Christopher-Nevis (within the Leeward Islands)	
St. Christopher and Nevis	1882–1958	Presidency within the Leeward Islands	
St. Christopher and Nevis	1958–1962	Part of province of Saint Christopher-Nevis-Anguilla of West Indies Federation	
St. Christopher and Nevis	1962–1967	Part of colony of Saint Christopher-Nevis-Anguilla	
St. Christopher and Nevis	1967–1980	Part of associated state of Saint Christopher-Nevis-Anguilla	
St. Christopher and Nevis	1980–1983	Associated state	
St. Christopher and Nevis	1983	Independence	:±:
St. John	1801–02	Occupation	
St. John	1807–1815	Occupation	Now part of the United States Virgin Islands
St. Lucia	1605–1640	Settlement	
St. Lucia	1640	Abandoned	
St. Lucia	1664–1667	Occupation	
St. Lucia	1762–63	Occupation	
St. Lucia	1781–1783	Occupation	
St. Lucia	1794–95	Occupation	
St. Lucia	1796–1802	Occupation	
St. Lucia	1803–1838	Colony	
St. Lucia	1838–1958	Crown colony part of colony of Windward Islands	
St. Lucia	1958–1962	Province of West Indies Federation	
St. Lucia	1962–1967	Crown colony	
St. Lucia	1967–1979	Associated state	
St. Lucia	1979	Independence	
Saint Martin	1690–1699	Occupation	
Saint Martin	1801–02	Occupation	
St. Thomas	1801–02	Occupation	
St. Thomas	1807–1815	Occupation	Now part of the United States Virgin Islands
St. Vincent and the Grenadines	1627–1636	Claimed	
St. Vincent and the Grenadines	1672	Claimed	
St. Vincent and the Grenadines	1762–63	Occupation	
St. Vincent and the Grenadines	1763–1776	Colony	
St. Vincent and the Grenadines	1776–1779	Crown colony	
St. Vincent and the Grenadines	1779	Occupied by France	
St. Vincent and the Grenadines	1783–1833	Crown colony	
St. Vincent and the Grenadines	1833–1958	Part of colony of Windward Islands	
St. Vincent and the Grenadines	1958–1962	Province of West Indies Federation	
St. Vincent and the Grenadines	1962–1969	Colony	
St. Vincent and the Grenadines	1969–1979	Associated state	
St. Vincent and the Grenadines	1979	Independence	
South Caribbean Islands	1763–1802	Colony	
South Caribbean Islands	1802	Dissolved	Included the present-day countries of Dominica, Grenada, and St. Vincent and the Grenadines, and the island of Tobago
Tobago	1762–1764	Part of colony of Windward Islands	
Tobago	1764–1781	Colony	
Tobago	1781	Colony of France	
Tobago	1793–1802	Occupation	
Tobago	1802	Colony of France	
Tobago	1803–1833	Crown colony	
Tobago	1833–1888	Part of colony of Windward Islands	
Tobago	1889	Amalgamated with Trinidad	
Tortuga	1631–1635	Colony	
Tortuga	1635	French possession	Now part of Haiti
Trinidad	1802–1888	Colony	
Trinidad	1889	Amalgamated with Tobago as "Trinidad and Tobago"	
Trinidad and Tobago	1889–1958	Colony	
Trinidad and Tobago	1958–1962	Province of West Indies Federation	
Trinidad and Tobago	1962	Independence	
Turks and Caicos Islands	1799–1848	Colony part of Bahamas	
Turks and Caicos Islands	1848–1874	Colony	
Turks and Caicos Islands	1874–1959	Colony part of Jamaica	
Turks and Caicos Islands	1959–1962	Province of West Indies Federation	
Turks and Caicos Islands	1962–1982	Colony	
Turks and Caicos Islands	1983–2002	Dependent territory	
Turks and Caicos Islands	2002–present	British Overseas Territory	(Turks and Caicos Islands)
Virgin Islands – see under "British Virgin Islands"
West Indies Federation	1958–1962	Federation of colonies	
West Indies Federation	1962	Dissolution	Included the present-day countries of Antigua and Barbuda, Barbados; Dominica, Grenada, Jamaica, St. Kitts and Nevis, St. Lucia, St. Vincent and the Grenadines, and Trinidad and Tobago, and the British Overseas Territories of Anguilla, Cayman Islands, Montserrat, and Turks and Caicos Islands
Windward Islands	1833–1956	Colony	
Windward Islands	1956–1960	Territory	
Windward Islands	1960	Dissolution	Included the present-day countries of Barbados (to 1885), Grenada, Dominica (from 1940), St. Lucia, and St. Vincent and the Grenadines, and (until 1889) the island of Tobago

=== South America ===
Name of territory	Dates	Status	Comments
Berbice	1781–82	Subordinated to Barbados	
Berbice	1782	Occupied by France	
Berbice	1796–1802	Occupied	
Berbice	1802	Restored to the Netherlands	
Berbice	1803–1814	Occupied	
Berbice	1814–1831	Colony	
Berbice	1831	United with Demerara-Essequibo to form British Guiana	Now part of Guyana
British Guiana	1831–1961	Colony	Formed by the merger of the colonies of Berbice and Demerara-Essequibo
British Guiana	1961–1966	Self-rule	
British Guiana	1966	Independent as Guyana	
Demerara	1781–82	Subordinated to Barbados	
Demerara	1782	French occupation	
Demerara	1796–1802	Occupied	
Demerara	1802	Restored to Netherlands	
Demerara	1803–1814	Occupied	
Demerara	1814	Merged with Essequibo to form Demerara-Essequibo	
Demerara-Essequibo	1814–1831	Colony	Formed by the merger of the separate colonies of Demerara and Essequibo
Demerara-Essequibo	1831	United with Berbice to form British Guiana	
Essequibo	1781–82	Subordinated to Barbados	
Essequibo	1782	French occupation	
Essequibo	1796–1802	Occupied	
Essequibo	1802	Restored to the Netherlands	
Essequibo	1803–1814	Occupied	
Essequibo	1814	Merged with Demerara to form Demerara-Essequibo	
Oyapoc	1620	Settlement	Now in Guyana
Pomeroon	1666–67	Occupied	
Pomeroon	1689	Occupation	
Pomeroon	1689	Incorporated into Essequibo	Now in Guyana
Willoughby	1652–1688	Settlement	
Willoughby	1688	Dutch occupation	Now Paramaribo, in Suriname

=== Asia ===
Name of territory	Dates	Status	Comments
Aden	1839	Colony subordinate to Bombay Presidency British India	
Aden	1932	Separate province of British India	
Aden	1937	Separate Crown colony	
Aden	1963	Part of Federation of South Arabia	
Afghanistan	1879	Protected state	
Afghanistan	1919	Independence	
Assam	1874–1905	Province of British India	
Assam	1905–1912	Incorporated into the new province of Eastern Bengal and Assam	
Assam	1912–1947	Province of British India	Now a state of the Republic of India
Bahrain	1880	Protectorate	
Bahrain	1961–1971	Autonomous	
Bahrain	1971	Independence	Invited to join the Trucial States, but declined
Baluchistan	1877–1896	Province	
Baluchistan	1896–1947	Province of British India	
Baluchistan	1947	Part of Pakistan	Now part of Balochistan and the Federally Administered Tribal Areas, in Pakistan
Bantam	1603–1609	Station	
Bantam	1609–1617	Factory	
Bantam	1617–1621	Presidency	
Bantam	1621	Expelled by the Dutch	
Bantam	1630–1634	Subordinated to Surat	
Bantam	1634–1652	Presidency	
Bantam	1652–1682	Subordinated to Surat	
Bantam	1682	Expelled by the Dutch	Now in Indonesia
Bencoolen ("Fort York", later "Fort Marlborough")	1685–1760	Coastal settlements of southwestern Sumatra, subordinated to Madras	
Bencoolen ("Fort York", later "Fort Marlborough")	1760–1785	Presidency	
Bencoolen ("Fort York", later "Fort Marlborough")	1785–1825	Subordinated to Bengal Presidency	
Bencoolen ("Fort York", later "Fort Marlborough")	1825	Part of Dutch East Indies	Now Bengkulu, in Indonesia
Bengal ("Fort William")	1634–1658	Factories	
Bengal ("Fort William")	1658–1681	Subordinated to Madras	
Bengal ("Fort William")	1681–82	Agency	
Bengal ("Fort William")	1682–1694	Presidency of Coromandel and Bengal Settlements	
Bengal ("Fort William")	1694–1698	Subordinated to Madras	
Bengal ("Fort William")	1698–1700	Presidency of Coromandel and Bengal Settlements	
Bengal ("Fort William")	1700–1774	Presidency	
Bengal ("Fort William")	1774–1905	Presidency of British India	
Bengal ("Fort William")	1905–1912	Partitioned between [West] Bengal and Eastern Bengal and Assam	
Bengal ("Fort William")	1912–1937	Presidency of British India	
Bengal ("Fort William")	1937–1947	Province of British India	
Bengal ("Fort William")	1947	Divided between India (West Bengal) and Pakistan (East Bengal)	Now Bangladesh, and part of West Bengal, Bihar, Odisha, and Jharkhand, in India
Brunei	1888	Protectorate	
Brunei	1967	Protected state	
Brunei	1984	Independence	
Burma (now called Myanmar)	1824–1852	Arakan, Tenasserim	
Burma (now called Myanmar)	1852–1886	Lower Burma	
Burma (now called Myanmar)	1885–1886	Upper Burma	
Burma (now called Myanmar)	1886	Lower and Upper Burma United as province of British India	
Burma (now called Myanmar)	1937	Separate Crown Colony	
Burma (now called Myanmar)	1948	Independence	Name changed to Myanmar after a military junta in 1989.
Eastern Bengal and Assam	1905–1912	Province of British India	Established upon the partition of Bengal (1905)
Eastern Bengal and Assam	1912	Partition reversed	Split between the re-established province of Assam and the re-constituted presidency of Bengal
Ceylon	1795	Ceded by the Dutch and subordinated to the Madras presidency of British India	
Ceylon	1798	Separate Crown colony	
Ceylon	1948	Independence	Now the Democratic Socialist Republic of Sri Lanka
Dansborg	1801–02	Occupied	
Dansborg	1808–1815	Occupied	
Dansborg	1845	purchased and incorporated into British India	Now in Tamil Nadu state, India
Frederiksnagore	1801–02	Occupied	
Frederiksnagore	1808–1815	Occupied	
Frederiksnagore	1845	Purchased and incorporated into British India	Now in West Bengal state, India
Hong Kong	1841	Hong Kong Island occupied	
Hong Kong	1843–1982	Crown colony	
Hong Kong	1860	Kowloon and Stonecutters Island ceded by China	
Hong Kong	1898	New Territories leased from China for 99 years	
Hong Kong	1942–1945	Occupied by Japan	
Hong Kong	1945–1946	Military administration	
Hong Kong	1983–1997	Dependent territory	
Hong Kong	1997	Handover to China as a special administrative region	
Kuwait	1899	Protectorate	
Kuwait	1961	Independence	
Indian Empire (British Raj)	1613	Company rule in India	
Indian Empire (British Raj)	1858	Crown rule over the Indian Princely states, the Presidencies and provinces of British India	
Indian Empire (British Raj)	1947	Independent as India & Pakistan after partition	India stopped being a Dominion of the British Empire/Commonwealth of Nations in 1950
Mandatory Iraq	1920–1932	League of Nations mandate never passed, replaced by Anglo-Iraqi treaty with the Kingdom of Iraq	
Java and the Spice Islands	1811–1816	Occupied	restored to the Netherlands
Malaya	1824	Transferred following Anglo-Dutch Treaty of 1824	
Malaya	1824–1867	Territory of British East India Company	
Malaya	1867–1946	Straits Settlements, Crown colony	
Malaya	1895–1946	Federated Malay States, protectorate	
Malaya	1885–1946	Johor, protectorate (part of Unfederated Malay States)	
Malaya	1909–1946	Kedah, protectorate (part of Unfederated Malay States)	
Malaya	1909–1946	Kelantan, protectorate (part of Unfederated Malay States)	
Malaya	1909–1946	Perlis, protectorate (part of Unfederated Malay States)	
Malaya	1909–1946	Terengganu, protectorate (part of Unfederated Malay States)	
Malaya	1942–1945	Japanese occupation	
Malaya	1945–1946	Military Administration	
Malaya	1946–1948	Malayan Union	
Malaya	1948–1957	Federation of Malaya	
Malaya	1957–1963	Independent state	
Malaya	1963	Annex North Borneo and Sarawak forming the renamed federation of Malaysia	
North Borneo	1882–1946	Protectorate	
North Borneo	1945–1946	Military administration	Labuan to British N. Borneo on 15 July 1946
North Borneo	1946–1963	Crown colony	Labuan to British N. Borneo on 15 July 1946
North Borneo	1963	Self-government	
North Borneo	1963	Annexed by Malaya into Malaysia	
Palestine	1920	Mandate	
Palestine	1948	British mandate dissolved; proposed partition plans never materialized; Israel established immediately after British withdrawal, with the short-lived All-Palestine government following six months later, and later the partially recognised State of Palestine	ongoing territorial dispute, see Israeli–Palestinian conflict
Pulo Condore Island (Côn Đảo)	1702	Possession of British East India Company	
Pulo Condore Island (Côn Đảo)	1705	Abandoned	Now Côn Đảo, in Vietnam
Sarawak	1888–1946	Protected States	
Sarawak	1945–1946	Military administration	
Sarawak	1946–1963	Crown colony	
Sarawak	1963	Self-government	
Sarawak	1963	Annexed by Malaya into Malaysia	
Straits Settlements	1826–1858	Possession under British East India Company	Now divided between Malacca and Penang, in Malaysia, and Singapore
Straits Settlements	1858–1867	Subordinated to British India	
Straits Settlements	1867–1946	Crown colony	
Straits Settlements	1942–1945	Occupied by Japan	
Straits Settlements	1946	Dissolved	
Qatar	1916–1971	Protectorate	
Qatar	1971	Independence	Invited to join the Trucial States, but declined
Surat	1612–1658	Factory	
Surat	1658–1668	Presidency	
Surat	1668–1685	Possession under British East India Company	
Surat	1685–1703	Subordinated to Bombay	
Surat	1703	Incorporated into Bombay	Now in India
Singapore	1824	Purchased	
Singapore	1824	Part of Straits Settlements (as residency of the Presidency of Bengal)	
Singapore	1867–1946	Part of Straits Settlements (crown colony)	
Singapore	1946–1955	Crown colony	
Singapore	1955–1959	self-governing colony	
Singapore	1959–1963	State of Singapore	
Singapore	1963–1965	Part of Malaysia	
Singapore	1965	Independence	
Transjordan	1920	Part of Palestine Mandate	Now known as Jordan
Transjordan	1923	Formally separated from Palestine	
Transjordan	1928	Emirate independent, except military and finance control	
Transjordan	1946	Formal independence as the Hashemite Kingdom of Jordan	
Trucial States	1892	Protectorate	
Trucial States	1971	Formation of Federation of Arab Emirates	Now part of the United Arab Emirates
Weihaiwei	1898–1930	Leased from China	
Weihaiwei	1930	Returned to the Republic of China	Now part of the People's Republic of China
West Bengal ("Bengal")	1905–1912	Province of British India	Established by the partition of Bengal. Abolished with the reversal of the partition and the creation of the new province of Bihar and Orissa.

=== Europe ===
Name of territory	Dates	Status	Comments
Akrotiri and Dhekelia	1960–present	Sovereign Base Areas	
Alderney	1198–1204	Lordship	
Alderney	1204	Fiefdom	
Alderney	1205	Fiefdom	
Alderney	1206–1279	Fiefdom	
Alderney	1279	Briefly occupied by France	
Alderney	1279–1660	Part of bailiwick of Guernsey	
Alderney	1660–1825	Seigneurie	
Alderney	1825	Subordinated to Guernsey	
Alderney	1940–1945	Occupied by Germany	
Alderney	1945	Restored to Britain	
Cyprus	1878	Administration while nominally remaining part of the Ottoman Empire	
Cyprus	1914	Annexation	
Cyprus	1925	Crown colony	
Cyprus	1960	Independence	Two sovereign base areas remain under British sovereignty; see under "Akrotiri and Dhekelia"
Dunkirk	1658–1662	Town and surrounding hinterland	
Dunkirk	1662	Incorporated into France	
England	927	Kingdom formed	
England	1282	Conquest of principality of Gwynedd (last remaining independent Welsh principality)	
England	1536	Annexation of Principality of Wales and Marcher Lordships into England	
England	1603	Personal union with Scotland	
England	1649	Republic as the Commonwealth of England. Scotland and Ireland united with England	
England	1660	End of Republic. Scotland independent again but in personal union with England	
England	1707	Political union with Scotland to form the Kingdom of Great Britain	(United Kingdom) Treaty of Union 1706 and Acts of Union 1707
Gibraltar	1704	Captured by Britain	
Gibraltar	1713	Colony	Ceded by Spain Treaty of Utrecht 1713
Gibraltar	1983	Dependent territory	
Gibraltar	2002–present	British Overseas Territory	(Gibraltar) Sovereignty claimed by Spain
Great Britain, Kingdom of	1707	Formed by union of the kingdoms of England and Scotland	
Great Britain, Kingdom of	1801	Union of Great Britain with Ireland to form the United Kingdom of Great Britain and Ireland	
Guernsey (incl. islands of Brecqhou, Herm, Jethou, Lihou, and Sark)	1198–1204	Lordship	
Guernsey (incl. islands of Brecqhou, Herm, Jethou, Lihou, and Sark)	1204–1205	Fiefdom	
Guernsey (incl. islands of Brecqhou, Herm, Jethou, Lihou, and Sark)	1206–1279	Fiefdom	
Guernsey (incl. islands of Brecqhou, Herm, Jethou, Lihou, and Sark)	1279–1940	Bailiwick	
Guernsey (incl. islands of Brecqhou, Herm, Jethou, Lihou, and Sark)	1940–1945	Occupied by Germany	
Guernsey (incl. islands of Brecqhou, Herm, Jethou, Lihou, and Sark)	1945–present	Bailiwick	
Heligoland	1807–1814	Occupied	
Heligoland	1814–1890	Colony	
Heligoland	1890	Incorporated into Germany	
Heligoland	1945–1952	Occupied	
United States of the Ionian Islands	1809–1815	Occupied	
United States of the Ionian Islands	1815–1864	United States of Ionian Islands, under British protection	
United States of the Ionian Islands	1864	Incorporated into Greece	
Ireland	1172	Lordship	Papal Bull Laudabiliter 1155
Ireland	1541	Kingdom subordinated to the English (later British) Crown	
Ireland	1801	Merged with Great Britain to form the United Kingdom of Great Britain and Ireland	Act of Union 1800
Irish Free State	1922	Independence from the United Kingdom	Anglo-Irish Treaty 1921
Irish Free State	1949	Declared a Republic	
Isle of Man	1266–1290	Fiefdom under Scotland	
Isle of Man	1313–1317	Fiefdom under Scotland	
Isle of Man	1328–1333	Fiefdom under Scotland	
Isle of Man	1333–1504	Fiefdom	
Isle of Man	1504–1594	Lordship	
Isle of Man	1594–1610	Direct Crown rule	
Isle of Man	1610–1649	Lordship	
Isle of Man	1649–1660	Commonwealth and protectorate	
Isle of Man	1660–1765	Lordship	
Isle of Man	1765–1827	Possession	
Isle of Man	1827–present	Crown dependency	
Jersey	1204	Fiefdom subordinated to Guernsey	
Jersey	1204–1205	Fiefdom subordinated to Guernsey	
Jersey	1206–1279	Fiefdom subordinated to Guernsey	
Jersey	1279–1380	Bailiwick subordinated to Guernsey	
Jersey	1382–1461	Bailiwick subordinated to Guernsey	
Jersey	1468–1487	Bailiwick subordinated to Guernsey	
Jersey	1487–1940	Bailiwick	
Jersey	1940–1945	Occupied by Germany	
Jersey	1945–present	Bailiwick	
Malta	1800–1813	Protectorate	
Malta	1813–1921	Crown colony	
Malta	1921–1933	Self-governing colony	
Malta	1933–1947	Crown colony	
Malta	1947–1958	Self-governing colony	
Malta	1958–1961	Crown colony	
Malta	1961–1964	Self-governing colony	
Malta	1964	Independence	
Menorca	1708–1713	Occupied	
Menorca	1713	Ceded to Britain	
Menorca	1714–1756	Colony	
Menorca	1756	Occupied by France	
Menorca	1798–1802	Colony	
Menorca	1802	Restored to Spain	
Rockall	1955	Annexed as the latest territorial addition to the United Kingdom.	
Rockall	1972	Made part of Scotland under Island of Rockall Act 1972.	(United Kingdom)
Sicily	1806–1815	Protectorate	
Sicily	1816	creation of the Kingdom of the Two Sicilies	
Scotland	1603	Personal union with England	
Scotland	1649	United with England and Ireland as the Commonwealth of England.	
Scotland	1660	Independent again but in personal union with England	
Scotland	1707	Political union with England to form the Kingdom of Great Britain	(United Kingdom) Treaty of Union 1706 and Acts of Union 1707
United Kingdom	1801	Formed by the union of the kingdoms of Great Britain and Ireland	
United Kingdom	1922	Secession of the Irish Free State	
United Kingdom	1927	Formal name changed from "United Kingdom of Great Britain and Ireland" to "United Kingdom of Great Britain and Northern Ireland"	(United Kingdom)
Wales (Cymru)	1282	Occupied	
Wales (Cymru)	1535	Annexed into England by Act of English Parliament	
Wales (Cymru)	1999	Devolved National Assembly established (renamed to Senedd (Parliament) in 2020)	

=== Antarctic Region ===
(Territories south of 60° S)

Name of territory	Dates	Status	Comments
British Antarctic Territory	1962–1982	Colony	
British Antarctic Territory	1983–2002	Dependent territory	
British Antarctic Territory	2002–present	British Overseas Territory	(British Antarctic Territory)
Enderby Land	1930–1933	Claimed	
Enderby Land	1933	Transferred to Australia	Now part of the Australian Antarctic Territory
Graham Land	1832	Annexed	
Graham Land	1908–1962	Dependency of Falkland Islands	
Graham Land	1962–present	Part of the British Antarctic Territory	
South Orkney	1821–1908	Claimed	
South Orkney	1908–1962	Dependency of the Falkland Islands	
South Orkney	1962–present	Part of the British Antarctic Territory	
South Shetland	1819–1908	Claimed	
South Shetland	1908–1962	Dependency of the Falkland Islands	
South Shetland	1962–present	Part of the British Antarctic Territory	
Victoria Land	1841–1933	Claimed	
Victoria Land	1933	Transferred to Australia	Now part of the Australian Antarctic Territory

=== Atlantic ===
(Islands in the Atlantic Ocean)

Name of territory	Dates	Status	Comments
Ascension Island	1815–1922	Possession	
Ascension Island	1922–2009	Dependency of St Helena	
Ascension Island	2009–present	Part of Saint Helena, Ascension and Tristan da Cunha	
Bermuda	1612–1684	Colony	
Bermuda	1684–1968	Crown colony	
Bermuda	1968–1982	Self-governing colony	
Bermuda	1983–2002	Dependent territory	
Bermuda	2002–present	British Overseas Territory	Bermuda Flag
Falkland Islands	1766	West Falkland settled	
Falkland Islands	1774	Settlement withdrawn	
Falkland Islands	1774–1833	Claimed	
Falkland Islands	1833	Settlement re-established	
Falkland Islands	1841–1892	Crown colony	
Falkland Islands	1892–1908	Colony	
Falkland Islands	1908–1962	Colony	
Falkland Islands	1962	The Falkland Islands Dependencies of South Shetland, South Orkney, and Graham Land are established as the separate colony of British Antarctic Territory	
Falkland Islands	1962–1982	Colony	
Falkland Islands	1983–2002	Dependent territory	
Falkland Islands	2002–present	British Overseas Territory	Falkland Islands Flag
Saint Helena, Ascension and Tristan da Cunha (formerly known as "St. Helena and its Dependencies")	1588–1673	St Helena claimed	
Saint Helena, Ascension and Tristan da Cunha (formerly known as "St. Helena and its Dependencies")	1673–1815	Possession of the East India Company	
Saint Helena, Ascension and Tristan da Cunha (formerly known as "St. Helena and its Dependencies")	1815–1821	Crown colony	
Saint Helena, Ascension and Tristan da Cunha (formerly known as "St. Helena and its Dependencies")	1821–1834	Possession of British East India Company	
Saint Helena, Ascension and Tristan da Cunha (formerly known as "St. Helena and its Dependencies")	1834–1982	Crown colony	
Saint Helena, Ascension and Tristan da Cunha (formerly known as "St. Helena and its Dependencies")	1983–2002	Dependent territory	
Saint Helena, Ascension and Tristan da Cunha (formerly known as "St. Helena and its Dependencies")	2002–present	British Overseas Territory	St. Helena Flag
South Georgia and South Sandwich Islands	1775–1908	Claimed	
South Georgia and South Sandwich Islands	1908–1985	Dependency of the Falkland Islands	
South Georgia and South Sandwich Islands	1985–2002	Dependent territory	
South Georgia and South Sandwich Islands	2002–present	British Overseas Territory	South Georgia and the South Sandwich Islands
Tristan da Cunha	(1816–1938)	Dependency of the Cape Colony	
Tristan da Cunha	1938–2009	Dependency of St. Helena	
Tristan da Cunha	2009–present	Part of Saint Helena, Ascension and Tristan da Cunha	

=== Indian Ocean ===
(Islands in the Indian Ocean)

Name of territory	Dates	Status	Comments
Andaman and Nicobar Islands	1789	British take possession of the Andaman Islands	
Andaman and Nicobar Islands	1848	British take possession of the Nicobar Islands	
Andaman and Nicobar Islands	1942–1945	Japanese occupation	
Andaman and Nicobar Islands	1947	Became part of India upon its independence	Now a union territory of India
Ashmore Island	1878	Annexed	
Ashmore Island	1931	Transferred to Australia	Now administered as part of the Ashmore and Cartier Islands
Cartier Island	1909–1931	Annexed	
Cartier Island	1931	Transferred to Australia	Now administered as part of the Ashmore and Cartier Islands
British Indian Ocean Territory	1810–1814	Occupied	
British Indian Ocean Territory	1814	Ceded to the United Kingdom by the Treaty of Paris	
British Indian Ocean Territory	1814–1903	Part of the colony of Seychelles	
British Indian Ocean Territory	1903–1965	Part of colony of Mauritius	
British Indian Ocean Territory	1965–1982	Colony	
British Indian Ocean Territory	1976	The Aldabra Group, the Des Roches islands, and the Farquhar Group/Des Roches are restored to the Seychelles	
British Indian Ocean Territory	1983–2002	Dependent territory	
British Indian Ocean Territory	2002–present	British Overseas Territory	British Indian Ocean Territory flag
Christmas Island	1888	Annexed	
Christmas Island	1889–90	Leased	
Christmas Island	1900–1942	Dependency of the colony of Straits Settlement	
Christmas Island	1942–1945	Japanese occupation	
Christmas Island	1945–46	Military administration	
Christmas Island	1946–1958	Dependency of the colony of Singapore	
Christmas Island	1958	Crown colony	
Christmas Island	1958	Transferred to Australia	
Cocos Islands	1825; 1826–1831	Settlement	
Cocos Islands	1831–1857	Fiefdom	
Cocos Islands	1857–1878	Crown colony	
Cocos Islands	1878–1886	Part of Ceylon	
Cocos Islands	1886–1942	Part of the colony of the Straits Settlements	
Cocos Islands	1942–1946	Part of Ceylon	
Cocos Islands	1946–1955	Dependency of the Colony of Singapore	
Cocos Islands	1955	transferred to Australia	Now the Australian territory of Cocos (Keeling) Islands
Heard Island and McDonald Islands	1833–1947	Claimed	
Heard Island and McDonald Islands	1947	Transferred to Australia	Now the Australian territory of Heard Island and McDonald Islands
Maldives	1796–1953	Protectorate	
Maldives	1953–54	Republic	
Maldives	1954–1965	Protectorate	See also the United Suvadive Republic (1959–1963)
Maldives	1965	Independence	
Mauritius	1809	Occupation of Rodrigues	
Mauritius	1810–1968	Colony	
Mauritius	1814	Formal cession by the Treaty of Paris	
Mauritius	1965	The Chagos Archipelago is transferred to the British Indian Ocean Territory	
Mauritius	1968	Independence	
Seychelles	1794–1810	Occupied	
Seychelles	1810–1814	Colony subordinated to Mauritius	
Seychelles	1814	Formal cession by the Treaty of Paris	
Seychelles	1814–1903	Colony	
Seychelles	1903–1970	Crown colony	
Seychelles	1970–1975	Self-governing colony	
Seychelles	1975–76	Self-rule	
Seychelles	1976	Independence	

=== Australasia and the Pacific ===
Name of territory	Dates	Status	Comments
Australia	1901–1942	Dominion	
Australia	1942-present	Adopted the Statute of Westminster into domestic law	Still continues as a realm/dominion
Baker Island	1886–1934	Claimed	Now a territory of the United States
Bonin Islands	1827–1876	Claimed	
Bonin Islands	1876	Annexed by Japan	
British New Guinea	1884–1888	Protectorate	
British New Guinea	1888–1902	Colony	
British New Guinea	1902	Transferred to Australia (Territory of Papua)	Now part of Papua New Guinea
Cook Islands	1888–1891	Protectorate	
Cook Islands	1891–1900	Federation	
Cook Islands	1900	Annexed by New Zealand	
Cook Islands	1965	Self-governance	
Coral Sea Islands	1879–1969	Part of Queensland, Australia	
Coral Sea Islands	1969	Became an Australian external territory	
Fiji	1874–1970	Colony	
Fiji	1970	Independence	
Friendly Islands (Tonga)	1889–1900	Tripartite protectorate	
Friendly Islands (Tonga)	1900–1970	Protected state	
Friendly Islands (Tonga)	1970	Independence	
Gilbert and Ellice Islands	1892–1916	Protectorate	
Gilbert and Ellice Islands	1916–1975	Crown colony	
Gilbert and Ellice Islands	1975	The Gilbert and Ellice Islands are split into the two separate colonies of the Gilbert Islands and Tuvalu (formally in 1976)	
Gilbert Islands	1975–76	Crown colony (with the same Governor of the Tuvalu colony)	
Gilbert Islands	1976–1979	Colony	
Gilbert Islands	1979	Independent as "Kiribati"	
Howland Island	1886–1935	Claimed	Now a territory of the United States
Jarvis Island	1889–1935	Annexed	Now a territory of the United States
Lord Howe Island	1788–1834	Claimed	
Lord Howe Island	1834–1855	Settlement	Now part of New South Wales
Macquarie Island	1810–1890	Part of the colony of New South Wales	
Macquarie Island	1890–present	Part of Tasmania	
Nauru
Nauru	1920–1942	League of Nations mandate (Australia, New Zealand and United Kingdom)	
Nauru	1942–1945	Japanese occupation (de jure League of Nations mandate)	
Nauru	1945–1947	League of Nations mandate (Australia, New Zealand and United Kingdom)	
Nauru	1947–1968	United Nations Trust Territory (Australia, New Zealand and United Kingdom)	
Nauru	1968	Independence	
New Hebrides	1824–1878	Protectorate	
New Hebrides	1878–1887	Neutral territory	
New Hebrides	1887–1906	Joint naval commission	
New Hebrides	1906–1980	Condominium with France	
New Hebrides	1980	Independent as "Vanuatu"	
New South Wales	1788–1900	Colony	
New South Wales	1901–present	State of Australia	
New Zealand	1769–1788	Claimed	
New Zealand	1788–1835	Part of New South Wales	
New Zealand	1835	Declared independence	
New Zealand	1835–1840	Protectorate	
New Zealand	1840–41	Part of New South Wales	
New Zealand	1841–1907	Colony	
New Zealand	1907–1947	Dominion	
New Zealand	1947	Adopted the Statute of Westminster into domestic law	Still a realm/dominion
Niue	1889–1900	Tripartite protectorate	
Niue	1900–01	Protectorate	
Niue	1901	Annexed to New Zealand (as part of the Cook Islands)	
Norfolk Island	1788–1844	Part of New South Wales	
Norfolk Island	1844–1856	Part of Van Diemen's Land (later Tasmania)	
Norfolk Island	1856–1897	Subordinated to New South Wales	
Norfolk Island	1897	Dependency of New South Wales	
Palmyra Atoll	1889	Annexed	
Palmyra Atoll	1898	Annexed by the United States	
Pitcairn Islands	1838–1887	Protectorate	
Pitcairn Islands	1887–1983	Colony	
Pitcairn Islands	1983–2002	Dependent territory	
Pitcairn Islands	2002–present	British Overseas Territory	Pitcairn Islands Flag
Queensland	1824–1859	Part of the colony of New South Wales	
Queensland	1859–1900	Colony	
Queensland	1901–present	State of Australia	
Samoan Islands	1889–1900	Tripartite protectorate	
Sandwich Islands	1794 – 10 February 1843	Protectorate	
Sandwich Islands	10 February 1843 – 31 July 1843	Ceded to Britain	
Solomon Islands	1889–1893	Tripartite protectorate	
Solomon Islands	1893–1942	Protectorate	
Solomon Islands	1942–1943	Japanese occupation	
Solomon Islands	1943–1973	Protectorate	
Solomon Islands	1973–1976	Autonomous protectorate	
Solomon Islands	1975	Renamed from "British Solomon Islands" to "Solomon Islands"	
Solomon Islands	1976–1978	Self-government	
Solomon Islands	1978	Independence	
South Australia	1788–1836	Part of the colony of New South Wales	
South Australia	1836–1900	Province (colony)	
South Australia	1901–present	State of Australia	
Tasmania (Van Diemen's Land)	1803–1825	Part of New South Wales	
Tasmania (Van Diemen's Land)	1825–1900	Colony	
Tasmania (Van Diemen's Land)	1856	Renamed as "Tasmania"	
Tasmania (Van Diemen's Land)	1901–present	State of Australia	
Tokelau (Union Islands)	1889–1916	Protectorate	
Tokelau (Union Islands)	1916–1949	Part of colony of Gilbert and Ellice Islands	Transferred to New Zealand
Tokelau (Union Islands)	1949	Transferred to New Zealand	
Torres Strait Islands	1879–present	Part of Queensland	
Tuvalu	1975–76	Colony administered with the same Governor of Gilbert Islands colony	
Tuvalu	1976–1978	Colony	
Tuvalu	1978	Independence	
Victoria	1839–1851	Part of colony of New South Wales	
Victoria	1851–1900	Colony	
Victoria	1901–present	State of Australia	
Western Australia	1791–1829	King George Sound settled	
Western Australia	1829–1832	Swan River Colony	
Western Australia	1832–1900	Colony	
Western Australia	1901–present	State of Australia	

== Treaties and acts of Parliament, etc. ==
This is a listing of the more important treaties, acts of Parliament, and other legal instruments and events affecting the nature and territorial extent of the British Empire.

Effective date	Name of treaty, etc.	Territorial effect
1536/1543	Laws in Wales Acts 1535 and 1542	Wales annexed to the Kingdom of England
1606	First Virginia Charter	Granted the Virginia Company the right to colonize the modern-day East Coast of the United States, with the London Company establishing the Colony of Virginia at Jamestown and the Plymouth Company receiving the right to colonize what would become New England
1613–1753	Covenant Chain	Series of treaties and alliances between Native American tribes such as the Iroquois Confederacy and British America
1621	Mayflower Compact	Established the legal and constitutional system of the Plymouth Colony
1628	Charter of the Massachusetts Bay Company	Established the Massachusetts Bay Company to colonize the region
1639	Fundamental Orders of Connecticut	Established English towns in the Connecticut River Valley as the Connecticut Colony
1651–1696	Navigation Acts	Regulated trade between England (and later Great Britain) and its overseas colonies through mercantilist policies, prohibiting them each from importing certain commodities to countries outside the British Empire and from producing certain products imported by the other
1663	Rhode Island Royal Charter	Granted legal recognition to the Colony of Rhode Island and Providence Plantations
1664	Articles of Surrender of New Netherland	Annexed the Dutch colony of New Netherland to England as the Province of New York
1652	1652 Articles of Peace and Friendship	Ceded Susquehannock land at the mouth of the Susquehanna River to white settlers from the Province of Maryland
1682	Frame of Government of Pennsylvania	Established political and constitutional system of Province of Pennsylvania
1669	Fundamental Constitutions of Carolina	Established political and constitutional system of Province of Carolina
1691	Massachusetts Charter	Established the Massachusetts Bay Colony
1701	Nanfan Treaty	Granted British recognition of Iroquois control of land seized in Beaver Wars
1707	Acts of Union 1707	Scotland and England unite as the Kingdom of Great Britain
1713	Treaty of Utrecht	Spain cedes Gibraltar to Britain. France cedes Newfoundland, Hudson Bay and Acadie to Britain.
1749–1764	New Hampshire Grants	Allowed for colonization in what would become Vermont
1758	Treaty of Easton	Returned Ohio Country to undisputed Native American control in exchange for assistance in French and Indian War
1763	Treaty of Paris	France cedes all its territories in America to Britain except Saint Pierre and Miquelon Islands.
1763	Royal Proclamation of 1763	Established trans-Appalachia as an "Indian Reserve" and prohibited white colonization west of the Appalachian Mountains
1765	Stamp Act	Issued direct tax on stamped paper in British America, led to the beginning of the American Revolution due to opposition to "taxation without representation"
1766	Declaratory Act	Repealed the stamp tax but declared that the Parliament of Great Britain virtually represented colonies and could pass legally biding legislation and taxes on their behalf
1767–1768	Townshend Acts	Series of legislation introducing taxes on British America
1768	Treaty of Fort Stanwix	Established Line of Property dividing the Indian Reserve from the Thirteen Colonies, as well as adding modern-day Kentucky and West Virginia to it
1773	Regulating Act 1773	Reformed Company rule in India
1774	Intolerable Acts	Series of laws to punish the Thirteen Colonies for the Boston Tea Party protest during the American Revolution, major cause of the American Revolutionary War
1776	Declaration of Independence of the United States	The Thirteen Colonies (New Hampshire, Massachusetts, Connecticut, Rhode Island, New York, Pennsylvania, New Jersey, Delaware, Maryland, Virginia, North Carolina, South Carolina, and Georgia) assert independence
1783	Second Treaty of Paris	Great Britain formally recognises the independence of the United States. End of the American Revolution.
1784	Pitt's India Act	Established Crown political control over Company rule in India
1788		New South Wales is established by settlement as a penal colony
1791	Constitution Act	The Province of Quebec is divided in two sections Upper Canada (now Ontario) and Lower Canada (now Quebec).
1801	Act of Union 1800	Ireland unites with Great Britain to form the United Kingdom of Great Britain and Ireland
1813	Charter Act 1813	Renewed the British East India Company's royal charter but discontinued its commercial monopoly over India with the exception of tea, opium, and trade with China
1814	Third Treaty of Paris	France cedes the Seychelles to Britain and Malta officially becomes a colony
1835	Declaration of the Independence of New Zealand	Asserted the sovereign independence of the United Tribes of New Zealand
1840	Treaty of Waitangi	New Zealand becomes a British colony
1850	Australian Constitutions Act 1850	Separated Port Phillip District from Colony of New South Wales to form the Colony of Victoria, and provided for similar processes to occur in Van Diemen's Land and South Australia
1852	New Zealand Constitution Act 1852	Granted responsible government to the Colony of New Zealand
1858	Government of India Act 1858	Ended Company rule in India by transferring political authority over the presidencies and provinces of British India from the British East India Company directly to the British Crown, creating the British Raj
1865	Colonial Laws Validity Act 1865	Allowed all colonial legislation to have full effect in the colonies as long as it did not interfere with Acts of the Parliament of the United Kingdom extending to the colony, preventing colonial statutes from being judicially overruled under English law
1867	British North America Act 1867 (known in Canada as the Constitution Act, 1867)	The Province of Canada, New Brunswick, and Nova Scotia federate as Canada
1870		Rupert's Land and the North-Western Territory are annexed to Canada
1871		British Columbia becomes a province of Canada
1876	Proclamation under the Royal Titles Act 1876	Queen Victoria adopts the title "Empress of India"
1899		Joint British-Egyptian condominium established over Sudan
1901	Proclamation under the Commonwealth of Australia Constitution Act (1900)	The Commonwealth of Australia is formed by the federation of the colonies of New South Wales, Victoria, Queensland, South Australia, Western Australia, and Tasmania
1910	Proclamation under the South Africa Act 1909	Union of South Africa formed by the federation of the colonies of the Cape of Good Hope, Natal, Transvaal, and the Orange River Colony
1912	Government of India Act 1912	Issued political reforms in the aftermath of the partition of Bengal
1914	Government of Ireland Act 1920	Granted Irish Home Rule, with autonomous devolved government to take control of Ireland
1914	Suspensory Act 1914	Delayed Irish Home Rule until the end of World War I
1914	Cyprus (Annexation) Order in Council 1914	Cyprus formally annexed
1916	Proclamation of the Irish Republic	The Irish Volunteers, Irish Citizen Army, and Irish Republican Brotherhood proclaim the Irish Republic.
1919	Irish Declaration of Independence	The Dáil Éireann declares the independence of the Irish Republic, which is not recognized by the British government and begins the Irish War of Independence.
1919	Government of India Act 1919	Granted limited responsible government for India, including a reformed Imperial Legislative Council and Provincial Councils
1920	Kenya (Annexation) Order in Council 1920	Most of the East Africa Protectorate is annexed as the Colony of Kenya
1920	Government of Ireland Act 1920	Partitioned Ireland into autonomous regions of Southern Ireland and Northern Ireland due to Irish War of Independence
1922	Anglo-Irish Treaty	Southern Ireland is separated from the United Kingdom as the Irish Free State
1922	Unilateral Declaration of Egyptian Independence	Egypt becomes independent
1926	Balfour Declaration of 1926	Declared the Dominions to be "autonomous Communities within the British Empire, equal in status" and established the Commonwealth of Nations
1930	Purna Swaraj	The Indian National Congress declared the Indian subcontinent's right to independence.
1931	Statute of Westminster	Canada, the Irish Free State, and the Union of South Africa obtain effective sovereignty
1934		Financial difficulties result in Newfoundland losing its status as a dominion
1935	Government of India Act 1935	Permitted limited provincial autonomy and autonomous institutions for India incl. the princely states, as well as separating Burma from India
1942		Australia adopts the Statute of Westminster, backdated to 1939
1947	New Zealand Constitution Amendment (Request and Consent) Act 1947	New Zealand adopts the Statute of Westminster
1947	Indian Independence Act 1947	India is partitioned into the independent dominions of India and Pakistan
1948	Republic of Ireland Act 1948	Abolished the Irish monarchy and replaced it with a democratically elected President of Ireland, severing final constitutional links between the United Kingdom and Ireland
1948		King George VI relinquishes the title "Emperor of India"
1948	Israeli Declaration of Independence	The Jewish community of Mandatory Palestine declares independence as the State of Israel
1949	Ireland Act 1949	British Parliament recognizes the Republic of Ireland Act 1948
1949	Newfoundland Act	Newfoundland becomes a province of Canada
1949	London Declaration	Allowed continued Indian membership in the Commonwealth of Nations after the abolition of the Indian monarchy
1955	Buganda Agreement (1955)	Reestablished Mutesa II as constitutional monarch of Kingdom of Buganda after the Kabaka crisis
1957	Malayan Declaration of Independence	The Federation of Malaya declares independence.
1957–1958	Lancaster House Agreements (Nigeria)	Negotiated independence of Nigeria from the British Empire as well as its post-colonial legal and constitutional system
1960	Nigeria Independence Act 1960	The Colony and Protectorate of Nigeria becomes independent
1960–1963	Lancaster House Agreements (Kenya)	Negotiated independence of Kenya from the British Empire as well as its post-colonial legal and constitutional system
1961	Buganda Agreement (1965)	Negotiated independence of Uganda from the British Empire as well as its post-colonial legal and constitutional system
1962	Jamaica Independence Act 1962	Jamaica becomes independent
1963	Malaysia Agreement	Transferred North Borneo, Sarawak, and Singapore from the British Empire to Malaya, renamed Malaysia under the agreement
1965	Rhodesia's Unilateral Declaration of Independence	Declared independence of Rhodesia from the British Empire, not recognized by the British government under principle of no independence before majority rule
1966	Barbados Independence Act 1966	Declared independence of Barbados from the British Empire
1970	Instruments of Independence	Fiji becomes independent
1971	Singapore Declaration	Identified the Commonwealth of Nations as a "voluntary association of independent sovereign states"
1979	Lancaster House Agreement	Agreement between Zimbabwe Rhodesia and the black nationalist groups ZANU and ZAPU ending the Rhodesian Bush War and temporarily resuming British control in preparation for majority rule and independence as Zimbabwe
1982	Canada Act 1982	Completed patriation of Constitution of Canada by ending British Parliament's authority to make laws and constitutional amendments related to Canada, severing final constitutional links between the two
1983		The status of "colony" is renamed "dependent territory"
1986	Constitution Act 1986	Severed final constitutional links between Britain and New Zealand, including the British Parliament's abilities to make laws related to New Zealand
1986	Australia Act 1986	Severed final constitutional links between Britain and Australia, including the British Parliament's abilities to make laws related to Australia.
1997	Sino-British Joint Declaration (1984) and the Hong Kong Act 1985	Hong Kong is transferred to the People's Republic of China
2002	British Overseas Territories Act 2002	The status of "British Dependent Territory" is renamed "British Overseas Territory"
2026		Chagos Archipelago will be transferred to Mauritius

=== Concessions in China ===
Country	Concession	Location (modern name)	Year established	Year dissolved	Note
International	Shanghai International Settlement	Shanghai	1863	1945	Formed from the British and American concessions
International	Beijing Legation Quarter	Beijing	1861	1945	
International	Kulangsu International Settlement	Xiamen	1903	1945	
United Kingdom	New Territories, Hong Kong	Hong Kong	1898	1997	
United Kingdom	Weihaiwei leased territory	Weihai	1898	1930	Liugong Island remained under British control as a separate territory until 1940
United Kingdom	Liugong Island	Weihai	1930	1940	Formerly part of Weihaiwei leased territory since 1898
United Kingdom	British concession of Tianjin	Tianjin	1860	1945	
United Kingdom	British concession of Hankou	Hankou	1861	1927	
United Kingdom	British Concession of Jiujiang	Jiujiang	1861	1929	
United Kingdom	British concession of Zhenjiang	Zhenjiang	1861	1929	
United Kingdom	British concession of Shamian Island, Guangzhou	Guangzhou	1861	1945	
United Kingdom	British concession of Amoy	Xiamen	1852	1930	
United Kingdom	British concession of Dalian	Dalian	1858	1860	
United Kingdom	British concession of Shanghai	Shanghai	1846	1863	Merged to form Shanghai International Settlement
United Kingdom	Trading warehouses at Tengchong (Tengyue)	Yunnan	Late 19th/early 20th century.		Still standing, with bullet holes. British diplomat Augustus Margary was murdered here in 1875. Consulate built 1921.

Additionally, there were more concessions were planned but never completed.

Country	Planned Concession	Location (modern name)
United Kingdom	British concession of Yingkou	Yingkou
United Kingdom	British concession of Jiangning	Nanjing
United Kingdom	British concession of Yichang	Yichang
United Kingdom	British concession of Wuhu	Wuhu
United Kingdom	British concession of Wenzhou	Wenzhou

== Territorial claims in Antarctica ==
- United Kingdom 1908–present
  - Falkland Islands Dependencies 1908–1962
  - British Antarctic Territory 1962–present
- New Zealand 1923–present
  - Ross Dependency 1923–present
- Australia 1933–present
  - Australian Antarctic Territory 1933–present
- South Africa 1947–present
  - Prince Edward Islands 1947–present

== See also ==
- Colonialism
- Decolonisation
- Impact of Western European colonialism and colonisation
- Imperialism
- List of British Empire-related topics
- List of countries that gained independence from the United Kingdom
- British overseas cities
- Scottish colonization of the Americas
