= British Leeward Islands =

1671–1816 and 1833–1959 British colony in the Caribbean

Colony of the Leeward Islands
- 1671–1816; 1833–1959
- Flag (1871–1952) Coat of arms (1909–1940)
- Anthem: "God Save the King" (1745–1816; 1833–1837; 1901–1952) "God Save the Queen" (1837–1901; 1952–1959)
- Areas under the authority of the Governor of Antigua (1833–1872)
- Status: Colony of the United Kingdom
- Capital: St. John's, Antigua
- Common languages: English (official); Antiguan and Barbudan Creole; Dominican Creole French
- Religion: Christianity (Anglican, Catholic, Methodist)
- Government: Constitutional monarchy
- Monarch
  - 1671–1685 (first): Charles II
  - 1952–1959 (last): Elizabeth II
- Governor in Chief
  - 1671–1683 (first): William Stapleton
  - 1956–1959 (last): Alexander Williams
- History
  - Established: 1671
  - Divided: 1816
  - Reformed: 1833
  - Federal colony: 1871
  - Dominica joined: 1871
  - Dominica left: 1940
  - Joined West Indies Federation (except the British Virgin Islands): 3 January 1958
  - Dissolution of the British Leeward Islands, and replaced by the British Virgin Islands: 31 December 1959
- Currency: Pound sterling (official); Spanish dollar; Mexican peso
Preceded by
Anguilla
Antigua
Barbuda
Dominica
Montserrat
Nevis
Saint Christopher
Virgin Islands
Succeeded by
West Indies Federation
British Virgin Islands

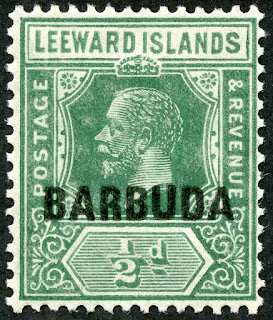
Leeward Islands stamp, 1922, with "Barbuda" overprint

The British Leeward Islands was a British colony from 1671 to 1958, consisting of the English (later British) overseas possessions in the Leeward Islands. It ceased to exist from 1816 to 1833, during which time it was split into two separate colonies (Antigua-Barbuda-Montserrat and Saint Christopher-Nevis-Anguilla–Virgin Islands). It was dissolved in 1958 after the separation of the British Virgin Islands, and the remaining islands became parts of the West Indies Federation.

== History ==
=== Stamp Act ===
The Stamp Act 1765 was greatly opposed in the Leeward Islands. The rate was twice as high for islands than for mainland colonies. Stamp duties were also tripled on crown land grants. More stamps were apportioned to the Leeward Islands than to any of the colonies on the mainland. The act did not bring any benefits to the islands, unlike the mainland colonies, as they would not receive additional military protection. The number of British soldiers in Antiqua fell from 700 to under 350 in 1764.

Samuel Martin, a former speaker of the Antiqua assembly, stated that the Stamp Act violated the rights in the Magna Carta, common law, and the Glorious Revolution. Riots against the Stamp Act broke out in St. Kitts and Nevis on 31 October and 5 November 1765. Around half of the free white male population in St. Kitts participated in the riots.

=== Reorganisation ===
The Leeward Islands were united again as a semi-federal entity in 1833, coming together until 1872 under the administration of the Governor of Antigua. The islands then became known as the Federal Colony of the Leeward Islands from 1872 to 1956. From 1833 to 1940, Dominica was part of the colony; in 1940, it was transferred to the British Windward Islands group.

On 3 January 1958, all islands except the Virgin Islands were absorbed into the West Indies Federation. The British Leeward Islands finally ceased to exist with the abolition of the office of its governor, and the elevation of the British Virgin Islands to the status of a separate crown colony, in 1960.

== Government ==
When the Leeward Islands were established it had four deputy governors, four councils, and four assemblies. A fifth assembly in Tortola was established in 1774. The deputy governors lived in England and the islands were in practice governed by the presidents of the councils. The governor was usually based in Antigua and no governor visited all of the islands until Ralph Payne, 1st Baron Lavington in 1773.

The government was altered in 1871 to be made up of one executive and one legislative council under the governor. The council, which met once a year, had ten elected members and ten appointed members. Each island had its own executive and legislative council.

== Economy ==
Absentee planters owned half of the property in St. Kitts by 1745.

== Military ==
In the 1660s the Leeward Islands started paying a 4.5% duty to cover the cost of the military and administrative costs.

English Harbour was the main harbor of the British navy in British America.

=== Armed forces structure in 1939 ===
The armed forces of the colony included structures from Saint Kitts and Nevis, Montserrat, Antigua, Dominica, and British Virgin Islands.

- Saint Kitts and Nevis Defence Force
- Royal Montserrat Defence Force
- Royal Antigua Defense Force
- Dominica Defense Force

== Demographics ==
By the end of the 18th century St. Kitts and Antiqua had the highest slave to free population in British America, 12 to 1 in St. Kitts and 15 to 1 in Antigua.

In 1891, the population was around 125,000, with 77% being black, 17% coloured, and 6% white. Saint Kitts and Nevis had a population of around 45,000, Antigua had around 35,000, Dominica had around 29,500, Montserrat had around 11,000, and the Virgin Islands had under 5,000 people.

== See also ==
- List of governors of the Leeward Islands
- Attorney General of the Leeward Islands
- Chief Justice of the Leeward Islands
- British Windward Islands
- History of the British West Indies
- Commonwealth Caribbean

== Works cited ==
- Morris, Daniel (1891). "The Colony of the Leeward Islands". Proceedings of the Royal Colonial Institute. 22. Foreign and Commonwealth Office Collection: 322–358. doi:10.2307/60231056. JSTOR 60231056.
- O'Shaughnessy, Andrew (1994). "The Stamp Act Crisis in the British Caribbean". William and Mary Quarterly. 51 (2). Omohundro Institute of Early American History and Culture: 203–226. doi:10.2307/2946860. JSTOR 2946860.
