= Antigua-Barbuda-Montserrat =

1816–1833 British colony in the Caribbean Sea

- 1816–1833
- Flag
- Capital: St. John's
- Demonyms: Antiguan; Barbudan; Montserratian

Government
  - Governor: George W. Ramsay (1816-1819); Benjamin D'Urban (1820-1826); Patrick Ross (1826-1832); Evan Murray-Macgregor (acting; 1832-1833)
- History
  - Established: 1816
  - Disestablished: 1833
Preceded by	Succeeded by
British Leeward Islands	British Leeward Islands
- Today part of: Antigua and Barbuda Montserrat

Antigua-Barbuda-Montserrat was a British colony in the West Indies from 1816 to 1833, established following the dissolution of the British Leeward Islands. During its existence, the hold of slavery over the islands began to wane, culminating in mass riots in 1831 that resulted in improved rights for much of the population and the reunification of the British Leeward Islands.

== History ==
Antigua, Barbuda, and Montserrat had been British colonies since the 17th century, although always administered separately. The British Leeward Islands, administered from St. John's, were abolished in 1816 following a yellow fever epidemic and a series of short-serving governors, mostly residing in Saint Kitts. The colony was divided into two, with the first governor of the island being George W. Ramsay who arrived in the middle of the year. The council agreed to pay him five-thousand pounds per year.

In Great Britain, a rumour emerged that slaveholders in the Caribbean were holding free blacks and colored people in slavery, resulting in the colony creating a slave registry to dispell this and to enforce the abolition of the slave trade. In 1817, George W. Ramsay had a temporary leave of absence and T. Norbury Kerby, the Antiguan treasurer, became the acting governor. During his tenure, his administration focused on enforcing the slave trade's abolition and ensuring that any slave that left the colony was properly documented. Ramsay died in 1819, being replaced by Benjamin D'Urban in 1820. A census was conducted on all three islands, showing a significant increase and a mostly black population. In Antigua, a 945-man militia was also raised. A yellow fever epidemic hit Montserrat in 1821, causing a minor population decrease. In 1823 a Montserrat militia was also established. In 1825, the first English bishop was appointed in the Caribbean, resulting in him touring the several colonies, including Antigua-Barbuda-Montserrat. This was a cause for celebration and he, Coleridge, was given 4,200 pounds per year from the government.

D'Urban was eventually recalled, being replaced by Patrick Ross in 1826. Ross attempted to establish himself with the island's elite, while trying to calm their fears over impending emancipation. In 1828 a "dandy fever" epidemic hit Antigua, which caused sufferers trouble with walking. An insurrection also occurred in 1831 among the black population, with martial law imposed and Ross eventually resigning in 1832. The insurrection caused most planters to allow their Antiguan slaves to visit the capital every other Sunday. The colony was abolished shortly after the appointment of Evan Murray-Macgregor to the reinstated Leeward Islands governorship, once again based in Antigua.

== Demographics ==
In 1823 a census was conducted. Antigua had a population of 37,031, including 30,985 black people, 4,066 colored people, and 1,980 white people. Montserrat had 6,124 slaves in 1821, 5,835 slaves in 1823, and a total population of 7,119 in 1828 including 5,986 black people, 818 free colored people, and 315 white people. In 1831 Barbuda had a population of 503.
