= Italian yuan =

Yuan italiano 意大利元
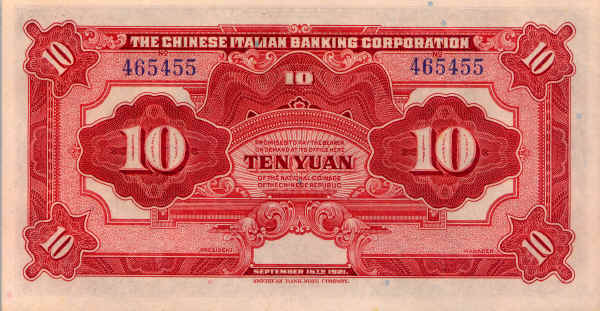

Denominations
- Banknotes: 1, 5, 10, 50 and 100 Yuan

Demographics
- User(s): Kingdom of Italy; Shanghai International Settlement

Valuation
- Value: 1 Italian Lira = 7,36 Italian yuan
- This infobox shows the latest status before this currency was rendered obsolete.

The Italian yuan (in Chinese: 意大利元, in Italian: Yuan italiano) was the currency used within the borders of the Italian concession of Tianjin and the other concessions of Italy in China (Such as in Beijing or Shanhai Pass) in the period between 1921 and 1943, at the start of the Japanese-Italian War.

== History ==
After the participation of the Kingdom of Italy in the repression of the Boxer Rebellion, Italy obtained a concession within Tianjin as part of the peace treaty (Also known as Tientsin). In 1902 the concession was finalized and the Italian presence in the area truly began.The more the Italian presence grew, the more companies and industries started to pop up within the concession; Thus, the need to open a local bank and create a local currency was becoming vital. Initially, the Ministry of Economy and Finance ignored the concession, however, after a request by Carlo Sforza , the Italian ambassador stationed in the Royal legation of Beijing in 1913, the economist Francesco Saverio Nitti grouped together various banks who were interested in investing within China. These companies, in 1920, founded the "Chinese Italian Banking Company", located in the Italian concession of Tianjin and also operating within the Shanghai International Settlement, and in the Italian concession in Beijing. In April 1921 the very first Italian yuan banknotes were printed (1, 5 and 10 Yuan) and in September of the very same year the 50 and 100 Yuan banknote were also created. With the Japanese occupation during the Japanese-Italian war in 1943, the banknotes stopped being printed and being valid.

== Related topics ==
- Italian concession of Tianjin
- Italian lira
- Numismatics
- Concessions of Italy in China
- Japanese-Italian War
