= Concessions of Italy in China =

Italian colonial holdings in China

Concessions of Italy in China were territories that the Kingdom of Italy controlled in China during the first half of the 20th century. After participating in suppressing the Boxer Rebellion, Italy obtained a concession in Tianjin (Tientsin) with full colonial rights and some minor areas (fortifications, commercial areas, partial concessions in the Shanghai International Settlement, etc.) in the defeated China.

Italy, in the first half of the 20th century, had concessions & possessions in Beijing, Tianjin, Shanghai, Amoy, and Hankou. Only in Tianjin, Beijing, and Shanhai Pass, was the Italian government in control (with colonial property rights). In the other locations, Italy was united (or affiliated) with other colonial powers - like with Great Britain in the Taku forts. At the Treaty Port in Beihai (southern China), there was a small area for Italian commerce. The main concessions (after Tianjin) were in Shanghai and the Legation Quarter in Beijing.

== History ==
Italy requested, in the last years of the 19th century, to have the Sanmen Islands in front of the Shanghai region, but the Qing dynasty refused to grant the concession. In early 1899 an Italian expedition was dispatched to China with the goal of establishing a coaling station in the bay of San-Mun, near Ningpo south of Zhoushan. The effort called the Sanmen Bay Affair was hampered, however, by opposition from the other European powers and by division among the Italians at home. The British were not supportive, nor were the Germans (supposedly Italy's ally at the time) who advised against it and at home Italian leftists & Marxists opposed such efforts to expand Italian trade and influence, feeling instead that Italy should be content to be a 'second-rate' power. King Umberto I was supportive as was Admiral Felice Napoleone Canevaro, the Foreign Minister, but the political establishment in Rome refused to make a definite commitment. The situation was exacerbated when the Chinese government, which had previously seemed open to the idea but only for the Zhoushan islands, suddenly refused the Italian request when it was presented. Admiral Canevaro was outraged at this turnaround, broke off diplomatic relations between Rome and Beijing and resigned from office to be replaced by Senator Emilio Visconti Venosta. The plan was dropped and the British breathed a sigh of relief as they had feared Italian competition in the Yangtze basin.

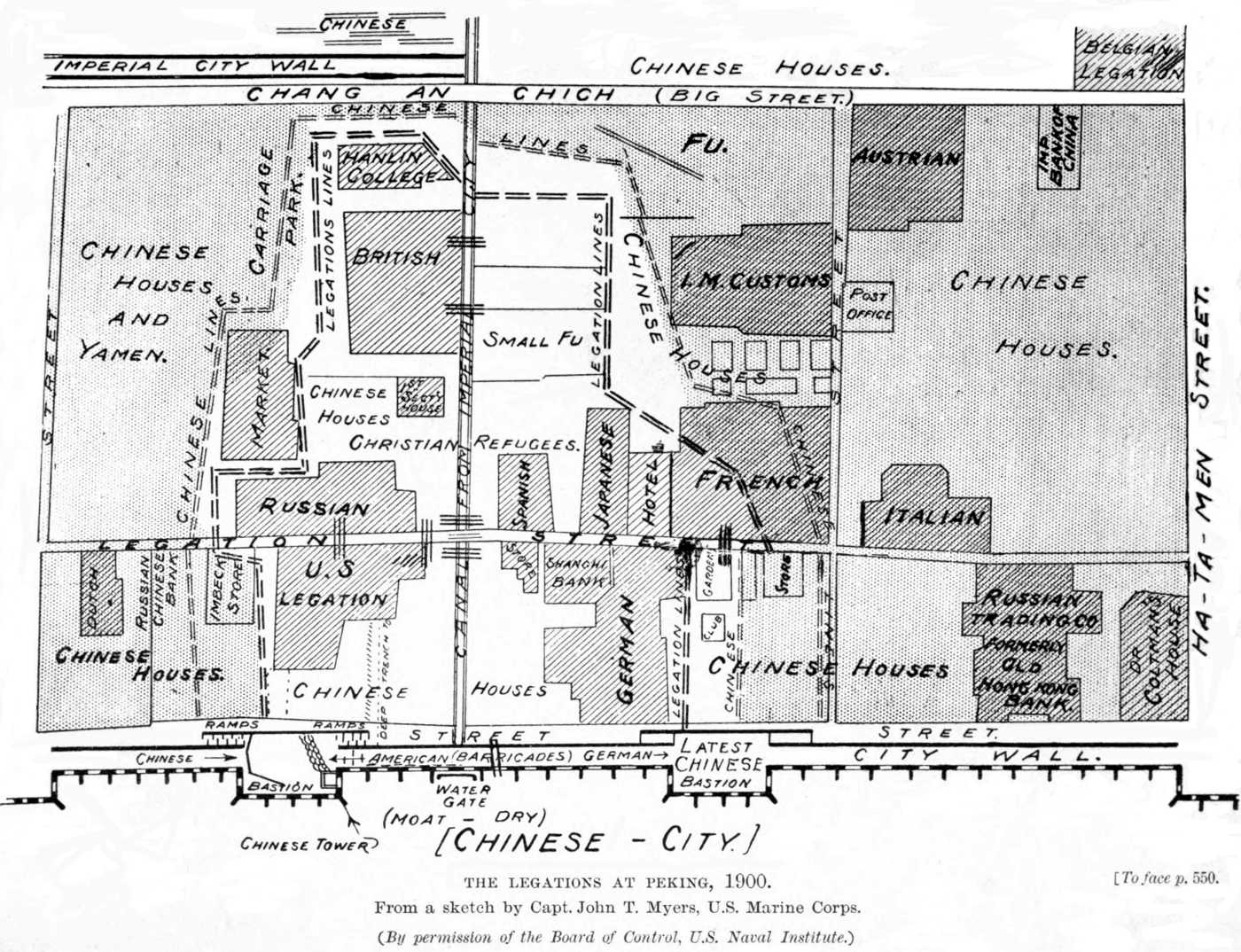
1900 Map showing the Italian colonial presence in Beijing

During the Boxer Rebellion in 1900, the Beijing Legation Quarter became the center of an international incident during the Siege of the International Legations by the Boxers for several months. After the siege had been broken by the Eight-Nation Alliance (that included Italy) at the end of the Battle of Peking (Beijing), the foreign powers obtained the right to station troops to protect their legations under the terms of the Boxer Protocol.

In addition, Italy obtained a concession in Tianjin, southeast of Beijing.

=== The Italian Concession of Tientsin ===
The Italian concession of Tianjin had an area of nearly one square mile and was initially located in a swamp area near the Hai River, with a few poor houses of Chinese farmers. The Italian government built infrastructure and a number of public buildings and by 1938, the area (called also "Tientsin") had a population of 14,879 Chinese and 739 Europeans (nearly all Italians). The Concession was called the "aristocratic quarter of Tianjin" because many rich Chinese families went to live there—creating nice mansions—in order to get refuge from the Japanese invasion of China:

After a difficult start, the concession, with the new street layouts and European-style villas, progressively assumed ‘the role of showcase of Italian art, with the import of decorating and building materials from the motherland’, especially for ‘the most representative objects, like the public buildings and the monumental fountain located at the centre for Queen Elena Square’...The so-called ‘the aristocratic concession’ (as Borgnino wrote) attracted both other foreigners and high-ranking Chinese residents. Among them: political theorist Liang Qichao, Tianjin Mayors Zhang Tinge, Cheng Ke, and Zhou Longguang, journalist Liu Ranggong, playwright Cao Yu, calligrapher Hua Shikui, the infamous 1923-24 ‘bribing president’ Cao Kun, warlord general Tang Yulin, 1921 Minister of Interior Qi Yaoshan, military and civil governor of Heilongjiang Bao Guiqin, Wang Guangyuan, and wealthy silk businessman Meng Yangxuan, all resided in Italian buildings in the concession’s area.

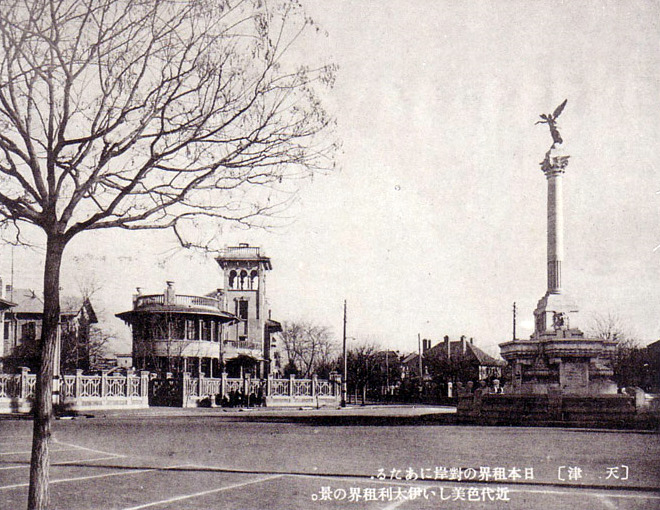
1940 photo of the Marco Polo square in the Italian concession of Tianjin

In 1902, the consuls of Great Britain, the United States, Germany, France, Italy, Spain, Denmark, the Netherlands, Sweden-Norway, Japan, and other eight countries signed the "Gulangyu delimitation charter" in the Gulangyu Japanese Consulate. Subsequently, in January 1903, the Kulangsu International Settlement Municipal Council was established: Italy had a "jointly-held concession" in Amoy since then.

Italy protected the Italian concessions and forts during the Japanese attack on China in the mid-1930s (additionally, nearly 800 Italian soldiers and sailors protected the Europeans -British, Russians, Germans, and also US citizens, etc..- resident in Shanghai in 1937, when the UK & US troops withdrew from the city).

In 1937, in Tientsin and Shanghai, there were stationed 764 men with officers and soldiers of "Battaglione Granatieri di Sardegna" arrived by ships from Massaua (Eritrea). Part of these effectives supported the English (2,500 men) and the American (1,400 men) contingents, who were already in Beijing and particularly in Shanghai to protect the Anglo-Saxon citizens (in Shanghai, there were 308 American civilians, 971 English, 199 Germans, 654 Japanese, 182 Russians, and 42 Italians)......On September 27th and October 24th (1937), some Japanese Mitsubishi bombers attacked the Italian light cruiser Montecuccoli during a raid against Shanghai. During these two missions was the Italian vessel hit by splinters and had one dead and several injured (the accident compromised seriously the diplomatic relationship between Rome and Tokyo)......Between March 1941 and September 1943, the Italian concession of Tientsin and the consulates of Shanghai, Hankow, and Beijing lived a quite peaceful period, in spite of the not optimal relationships with the Japanese occupation military Command

=== The Shanghai International Settlement ===
In the Shanghai International Settlement, Italy was given a small area during World War I. The Shanghai Volunteer Corps (a multinational, mostly volunteer force controlled by the Shanghai Municipal Council) included a company of Italians from 1914 to 1920, when it was disbanded. Only a few dozen Italian soldiers & sailors—under direct orders of the Italian governors in Tianjin—remained in the city. However, during the Fascist period, the number of Italian troops increased in Shanghai, mainly because of the Japanese invasion of China in the mid-1930s

Seal of Shanghai Settlement showing the Kingdom of Italy flag

After WWI the Kingdom of Italy maintained troops in the area of Shanghai, that was used as a commercial concession inside the Shanghai International Settlement (S.I.S.). This settlement was wholly foreign-controlled, with staff of all nationalities, including British, Americans, Danes, Germans and Italians.

In reality, the British held the largest number of seats on the Council and headed all the Municipal departments. The only department not chaired by a Briton was the "Municipal Orchestra", which was controlled by an Italian.

The International Settlement maintained its own fire-service, police force (the Shanghai Municipal Police), and even possessed its own military reserve in the Shanghai Volunteer Corps.

Following some disturbances at the British concession in Hankow in 1927, the defences at Shanghai were augmented by a permanent battalion of the British Army, which was referred to as the Shanghai Defence Force and a contingent of US Marines. Other armed forces would arrive in Shanghai: the French Concession had a defensive force of Annamite troops, the Italians also introduced their own marines, as did the Japanese (whose troops eventually outnumbered the other countries' many times over).

In ‘Old Shanghai’, there were specific areas with a high concentration of Italian economic activities (in the International Settlement: Kiukiang Road; Kiangse Road; crossroads between Nanking Road and Szechuen Road; Bubbling Well Road), areas with Italian residences (French Concession), other suburban areas with Italians (Zikawei; in this case, they were priests). Moreover, Italians were involved in specific economic sectors (primarily, silk): as the textile sector was developed mainly in Lombardy at that time, most of the expatriate Italian managers and supervisors in Shanghai mills came from this Italian region, according to Stefano Piastra.

In the late 1930s was reinforced the military presence in the small area of Shanghai (that was next to the American concession and north of the French concession) controlled by the Italians. The Regia Marina stationed in the Shanghai port periodically some ships like the cruisers Trento and Raimondo Montecuccoli during the Japanese invasion of China. In 1947 the Peace Treaty forced Italy to renounce to it with article 26, that stated: "(Italy) agrees to the reversion of the said Settlements (at Shanghai and Amoy) to the Administration and control of the Chinese Government".

=== Forts in Shan Hai Kuan & in Ta-Ku ===
From 1900 until the early 1940s, the Italians even held small forts like the Forte di Shan Hai Kuan near the Great Wall of China's end in Manchuria and the "Forte nordoccidentale in Ta-Ku". The one in Ta-Ku (called "N.W fort of Ta-Ku") was held together with the British for a couple of years. In 1901 the Italian ships Giava and Vettor Pisani occupied the forts at the end of the Great Wall of China. There were only a few clashes in open areas. The commander of the International Army assigned the occupied forts to the various nations: No. 1 on the ocean to the combined forces, No. 2 to the Italians, No. 3 to the French, No. 4 to the British, Nos. 5 and 7 to the Russians, and No. 6 to the Japanese.

In 1902, Italy's right to maintain a contingent in the Shan Hai Kuan fort was officially recognized, but the following year it was reduced to just 20 sailors. In 1906, these too were withdrawn. In 1918, the Italian presence returned with the unloading of materials arrived by ship for military operations towards the Trans-Siberian Railway.

In 1931, the small garrison was reinforced, but in 1937 it was temporarily abandoned following the Japanese advance. In 1940, at the beginning of the Second World War, the Italian Royal Navy's military forces stationed in China were roughly distributed as follows: 200 in Shanghai, 180 in Tianjin, 30 in Beijing, and 20 in Shan Hai Kuan.

=== Commercial Concessions in Hankow and in Amoy ===
In Hankow since the 1900 was located an Italian consulate, that later was enlarged in order to have a small commercial concession.

Hankow was the center of Catholic missions and had many Italian priests and nuns who were protected by Italian troops in the 1920s and early 1930s (in the late 1920s nearly 40% of the Italian civilians in China were religious personnel of the Roman Catholic Church).

On January 10, 1902, the consuls of Great Britain, the United States, Germany, France, Italy, Spain, Denmark, the Netherlands, Sweden-Norway, Japan and other eight countries signed the "Gulangyu delimitation charter" in the Gulangyu Japanese Consulate. Subsequently, in January 1903, the Gulangyu International Settlement Municipal Council was established in Amoy Stefano Piastra

Another small commercial area under Italian control was in Amoy (Xiamen), after WWI. Amoy's European settlements (like the small Italian consulate) were concentrated on the islet of Gulangyu off the main island of actual Xiamen in the region of Hong Kong.

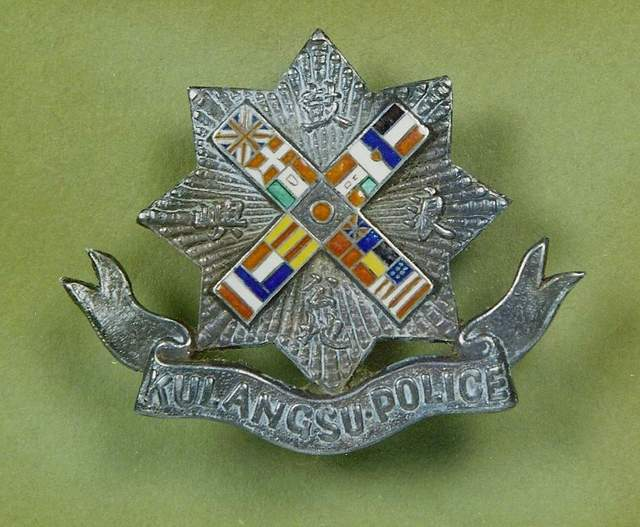
Gulangyu Police badger showing the Kingdom of Italy flag

In the early 1930s only the small consulate of Hankow remained under Italian control (before the Japanese conquest of the city), while the Italian consulate in Gulangyu remained active until the start of WW2.

In 1942 the Japanese army took control of the Gulangyu island with Amoy, ending the "Gulangyu international settlement". Today, Gulangyu is known for colonial architecture, with some examples of the Italian one.

Gulangyu's international settlement was one of the two only international settlements in China (the other was in Shanghai).

This island has the only piano museum of China, that shows an original italian piano from the early 19th century, that was taken from the Gulangyu Italian consulate.

All these concessions and forts were lost by the Kingdom of Italy in the Peace Treaty of 1947, after Italy's defeat in WWII

== Consuls ==
- Cesare Poma (1901–1903)
- Giuseppe Chiostri (1904–1906)
- Oreste Da Vella (1907–1911)
- Vincenzo Fileti (1912–1919)
- Marcello Roddolo (1920–1921)
- Luigi Gabrielli di Quercita (1921–1924)
- Guido Segre (1925–1927)
- Luigi Neyrone (1928–1932)
- Filippo Zappi (1933–1938)
- Ferruccio Stefenelli (1939–1943)

== Commerce ==
Some Italian industries and commercial companies created facilities in the concession of Tianjin (and a few also in Shanghai): the commerce between Italy and China increased in a huge way. More than 60 Italian companies were present in 1938, many working in agricultural products.

In 1932...the Italian shipping company "Lloyd Triestino" opened a new service linking Italy to Shanghai by scheduling on that route two modern trans-atlantic vessels, the "Conte Biancamano" and "the Conte Rosso" (which immediately set a speed world record of only 23 days during the first voyage). With this new service, supported by those of other companies employed in the trade of various goods and products, the economic exchange between Italy and China reached such good levels to alarm Great Britain and France. Alberto Rosselli M.H.

The Italian possessions in China enjoyed a relatively good economic development, with huge Italian-Chinese commerce in the 1920s and in the 1930s. The main 4 banks of Italy opened agencies in Tianjin and Shanghai. In 1924, the Italian government created the "Italian Bank for China" and the "Compagnia Italiana d'Estremo Oriente" (CIDEO) for the growing commerce between Italy and China

Recently have been found writings that are related to a possible Italian pidgin in Shanghai (and Tianjin). Indeed in 1940 there were nearly 600 Italian civilians living mainly in Tientsin and Shanghai: nearly all of them were forced to leave China by 1945/1946

== See also ==
- Italian concession of Tianjin
- Concessions in China
- Italian Empire

== Bibliography ==
- Mansor, Suffian (2009). Tientsin and its hinterland in Anglo-Chinese relations, 1925-1937 (PhD thesis). The University of Bristol.
- Bassetti, Sandro. "Colonia italiana in Cina". Editoriale Lampi di stampa. Roma, 2014 ISBN 8848816568 ()
- Marinelli, Maurizio (May 2010). "Internal and External Spaces: The emotional capital of Tianjin's Italian concession". Emotion, Space and Society. 3 (1): 62–70. doi:10.1016/j.emospa.2010.01.009.
- Grasselli, Enrico. "L’esercito italiano in Francia e in Oriente Corbaccio". ed. M. Milano, 1934.
- Marinelli, Maurizio (2014). Italy's Encounter with Modern China: Imperial Dreams, Strategic Ambitions. New York: Palgrave Macmillan.
