= Austro-Hungarian concession of Tianjin =

Area in Tianjin, China, occupied by Austria-Hungary

Austro-Hungarian concession of Tientsin
- 1901–1917
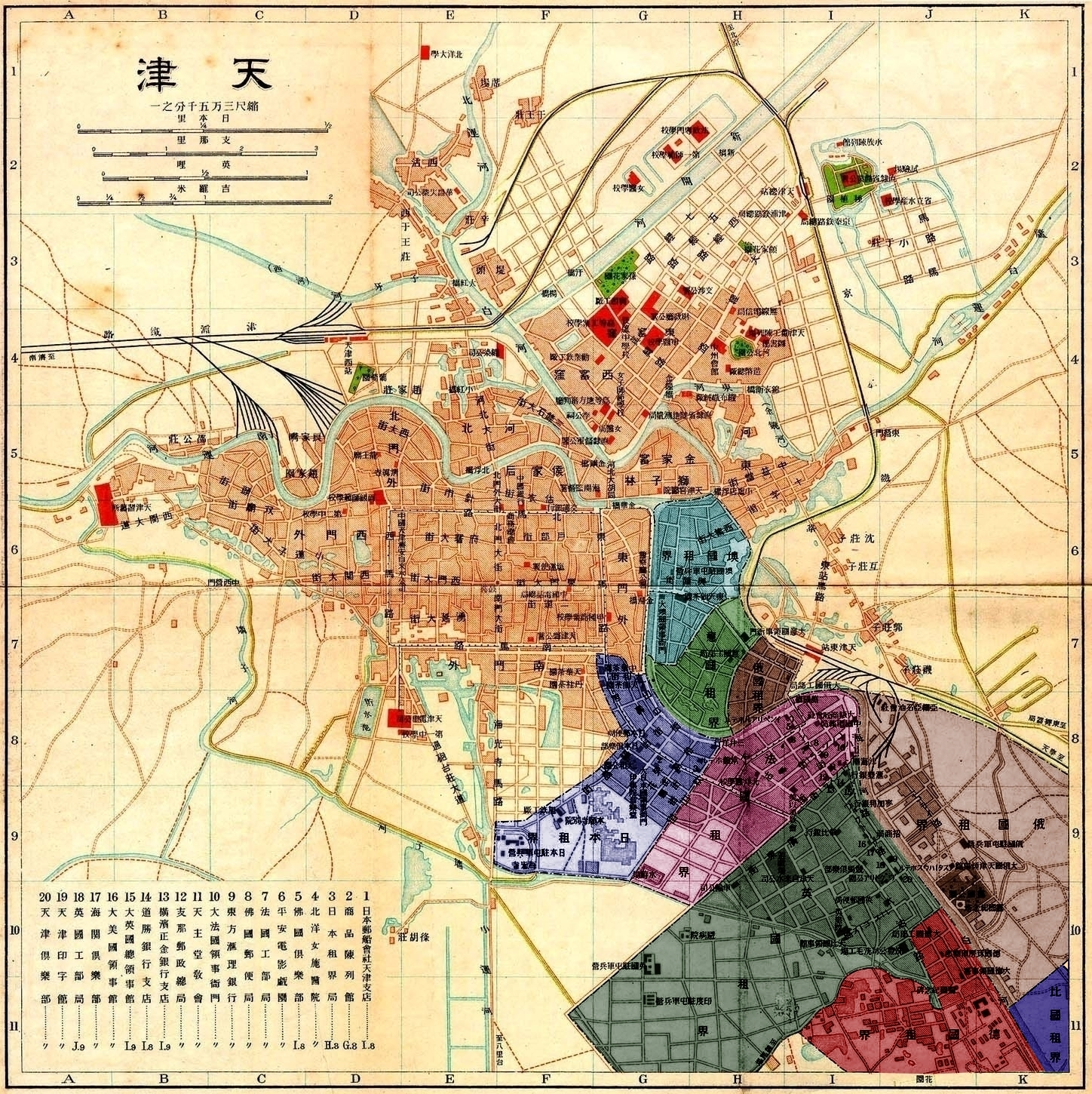
- Map of Tianjin concessions. The Austro-Hungarian concession (above the Italian concession in dark green) is in cyan.

- Location within the Tianjin Provisional Government
- Status: Concession of Austria-Hungary
- History
  - Established: 1901
  - Annexation: 1917
Preceded by	Succeeded by
Qing dynasty	Italian concession of Tianjin

The Austro-Hungarian concession of Tianjin (Chinese: 天津奥租界; pinyin: Tiānjīn ào zūjiè, German: österreichisch-ungarische Konzession, Hungarian: Osztrák–magyar tiencsini koncesszió) was a territory (concession) in the Chinese city of Tientsin occupied by Austria-Hungary between 1902 and 1920. It had been obtained by Austria-Hungary after the signing of the Boxer Protocol at the conclusion of the conflict between China and the Alliance of Eight Nations, which had sent an international expeditionary force to quell the Boxer Rebellion of 1901. Although the Austro-Hungarian occupation corps had been present from the previous year, the concession formally began on 27 December 1902. It is the shortest lived concession, having existed for only 14 years.

== History ==
The Austro-Hungarian concession, with an extension of 108 hectares, was one of the minor concessions made by the Qing Dynasty to the victorious powers following the Boxer Rebellion. This was due to the limited Austro-Hungarian participation in the international expeditionary force: four cruisers and 296 soldiers. The concession bordered the Hai River in the west, across the bridge from Tianjin City, to the Jingshan Railway in the east, and Jinzhong River (now Shizilin Street, Hebei District), a tributary of the Haihe River to the north. Across the river is a century-old French building, Old Cathedral of Our Lady of Victories, in Hebei District. It is adjacent to Tianjin Italian Concession, which is also located in Hebei District.

Austria-Hungary maintained guards there, unlike the rest of the foreign concessions in Tianjin.

Contrary to what was done by the other European powers, Austria-Hungary granted citizenship to all the local populations. The administration was entrusted to a council made up of local nobles, the imperial consul and the commander of the military garrison which included 40 sailors from the Austro-Hungarian Navy and 80 Chinese policemen called Shimbo. The two Austro-Hungarian representatives had the majority right in the council meetings. The juridical law applied in court was the Austro-Hungarian one.

In the concession were built a theatre, spa, school, pawnshop, barracks, prison, hospital and cemetery. The relatively short presence, about 14 years, left traces of the Habsburg style still found today in that area of the city.

After the outbreak of World War I in 1914, Austria-Hungary's concession was relatively isolated. The electricity supply was guaranteed from the Belgian concession, and the water supply was guaranteed by a British company in Tientsin, China. Also, four hundred Austrian sailors landed in Tianjin and snuck their way to the siege of Qingdao to assist the German forces. While this was happening, the Allies were spying on the Central Powers concessions.

=== Chinese occupation ===
Chinese occupation of Austro-Hungarian Tientsin
- Part of Asian and Pacific theatre of World War I part of World War I
Date	August 14th, 1917
Location	Austro-Hungarian concession of Tianjin, China
Result	Allied Victory
Territorial changes	Liquidation of the concession

Belligerents
Allied Powers: China	Central Powers: Austria-Hungary: (Austria-Hungary) Austro-Hungarian concession of Tianjin

Commanders and leaders
(Republic of China (1912–1949)) Sun Yat-sen	Hugo Schumpeter

Strength
400–600 police officers	18 sailors; 1 doctor; 1 officer; 2 guards at Tanggu

Casualties and losses
None	All sailors and extra personal captured and sent home; Ammunition destroyed

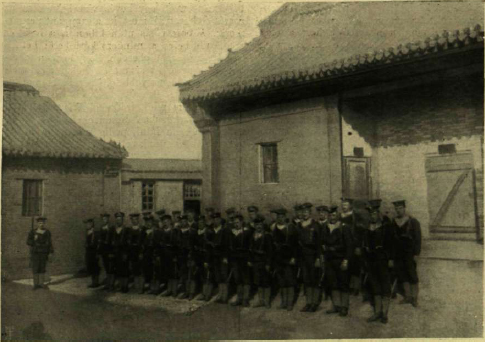
Austro-Hungarian troops in China circa 1903-04

With the First World War, China entered the war alongside the Triple Entente against the Central Powers and immediately occupied the Austro-Hungarian and German concessions, declaring them revoked on 14 August 1917.

==== Austrian recount ====
The recount by the Austrian consul states that at 10:30 in the morning, he said, the German consul informed him by telephone that China had declared war on Austria-Hungary and Germany and that the Dutch delegate would arrive in Tianjin later that day. At 11:30 a Chinese delegate arrives with a request to cancel the concession and subordinate the naval detachment. Since it was not possible to agree on ammunition, the sailors destroyed them. Completely free to move, they then traveled to Beijing in uniform with their equipment. The Dutch delegate persuaded the consul to accept the Chinese ultimatum, and the concession was handed over in the most formal manner at 16:00. From four to six hundred police then entered the concession, and the Chinese flag was raised on the administration building. Cash (between two and three thousand dollars) was transferred to China; the bank account belonged to the consulate.

==== Chinese recount ====
The Chinese recount states that at 16:00 the Chinese authorities fully occupied of the concession and stationed policemen and the Chinese flag was raised at the barracks and administration building.

=== Renunciation treaties ===
At the end of the war, with the dissolution of Austria-Hungary, two separate treaties were necessary to ratify the revocation. Austria renounced the rights on the concession on 10 September 1919 with the Treaty of Saint-Germain-en-Laye, Hungary renounced them on 4 June 1920 with the Treaty of Trianon. In June 1927, the concession was incorporated into the Italian concession following a series of clashes between opposing Chinese factions.

== Development ==
The Austria-Hungarian Empire's trade with China itself was extremely limited, and the concession was located at the northernmost end of the Haihe River, which was not conducive to shipping. Therefore, the concession was not an important financial and trading area. However, the Austrian Concession was located between the old city and the Tianjin Railway Station. Soon after the concession was delimited, the Belgian Shichang Tram and Electric Company constructed a tram line from the east gate of the old city to the railway station, and at the same time rebuilt the east pontoon bridge into an iron bridge. Named Jintang Bridge (now Jintang Bridge in Hebei District), a commercial street with concentrated Chinese retail businesses was formed along the main road (now Jianguo Road in Hebei District) where trams passed.

== Gallery ==
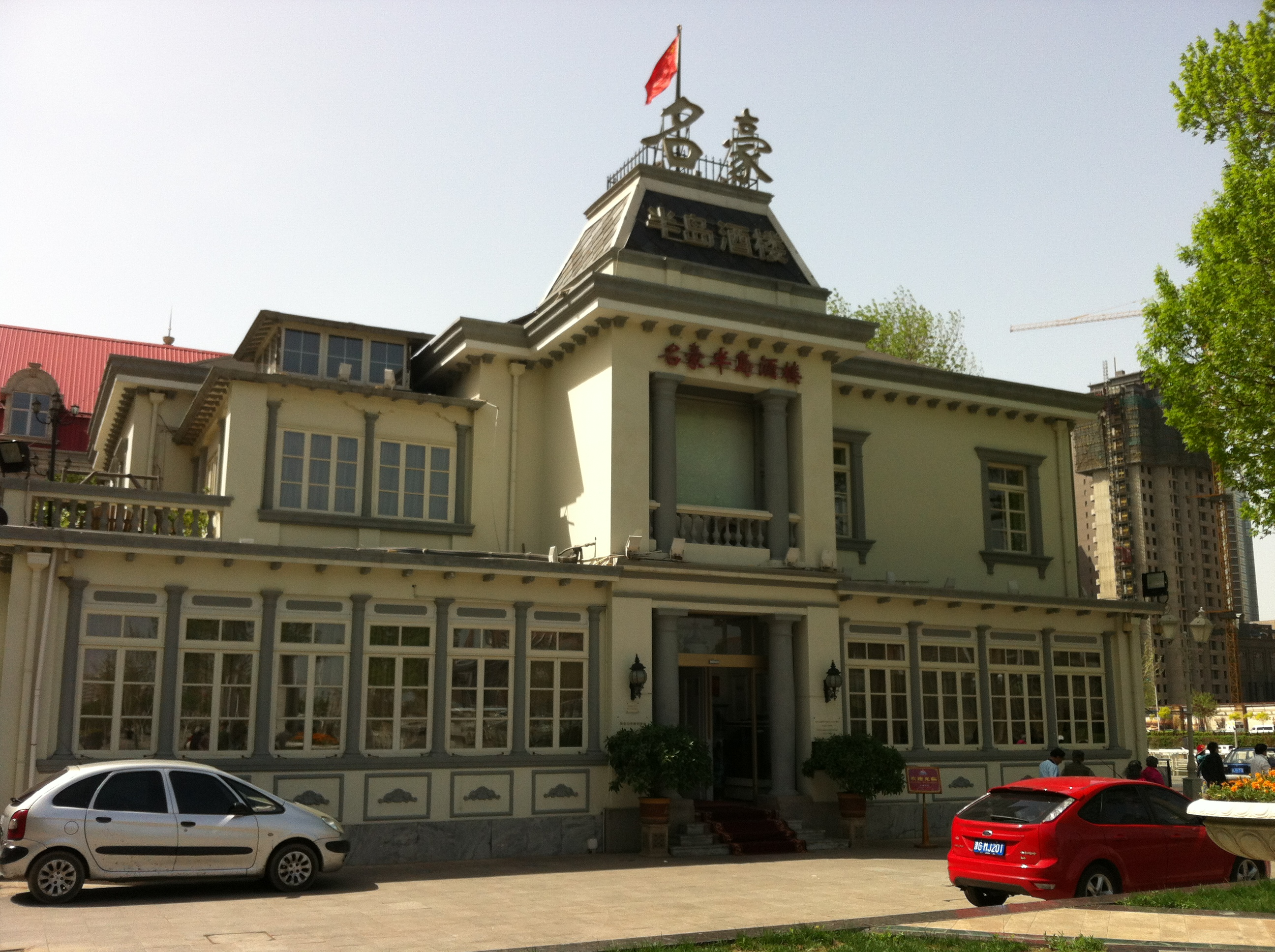
The former Austro-Hungarian consulate

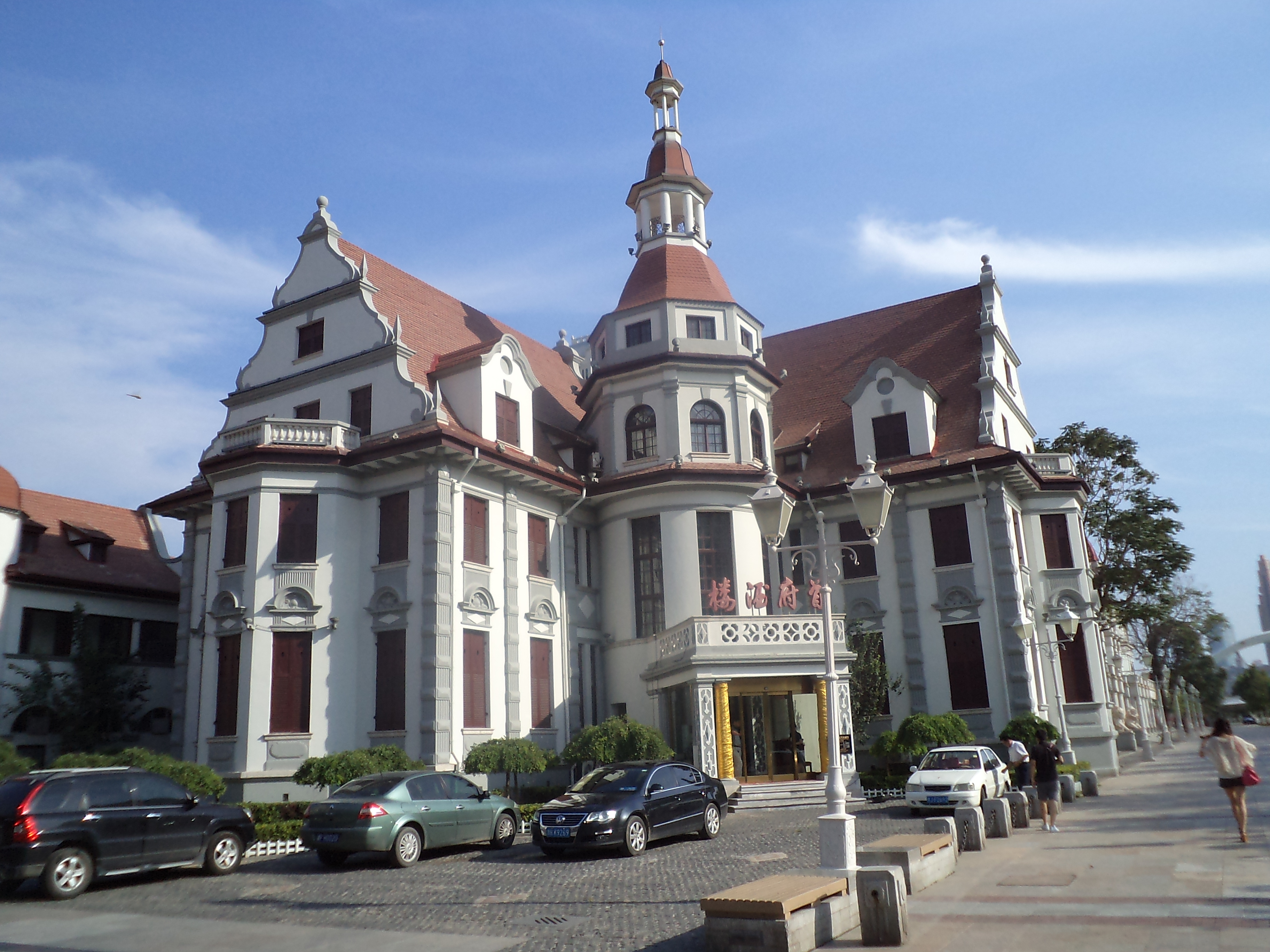
The villa of Yuan Shikai

== List of consuls ==
- Carl Bernauer (1901–1908)
- Erwin Ritter von Zach (1908)
- Miloslav Kobr (1908–1912)
- Hugo Schumpeter (1913–1917)

== See also ==
- Foreign concessions in Tianjin
- Foreign concessions in China
- Map of concessions in Tianjin (in Chinese)
- Shanghai Ghetto
