= German concession of Hankou =

German Concession in China

Hankou German Concession 漢口德租界
- 1895–1917
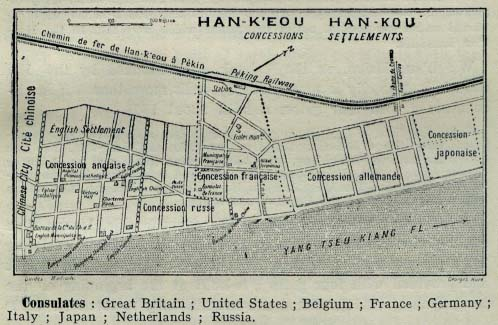

- Map of foreign concessions in Hankou, 1912 Location of the German concession of Hankou in green Other concessions in light green
- Government
  - Type: Concession
- Historical era: 1895-1917
  - Established: 1895
  - Disestablished: 1917
- Today part of: China

The German concession in Hankou (Chinese: 漢口德租界; Hànkǒu dé zūjiè; German: Deutsche Konzession in Hankau) was a German concession in Hankou, China, under administration from 3 October 1895 to 16 March 1917, when it was occupied by Chinese forces. It was one of five concession districts within Hankou, Wuhan, Hubei.

In the German concession, there was a branch of the Deutsch-Asiatische Bank, that was established in 1897. The city also contained a German consulate.

== History ==
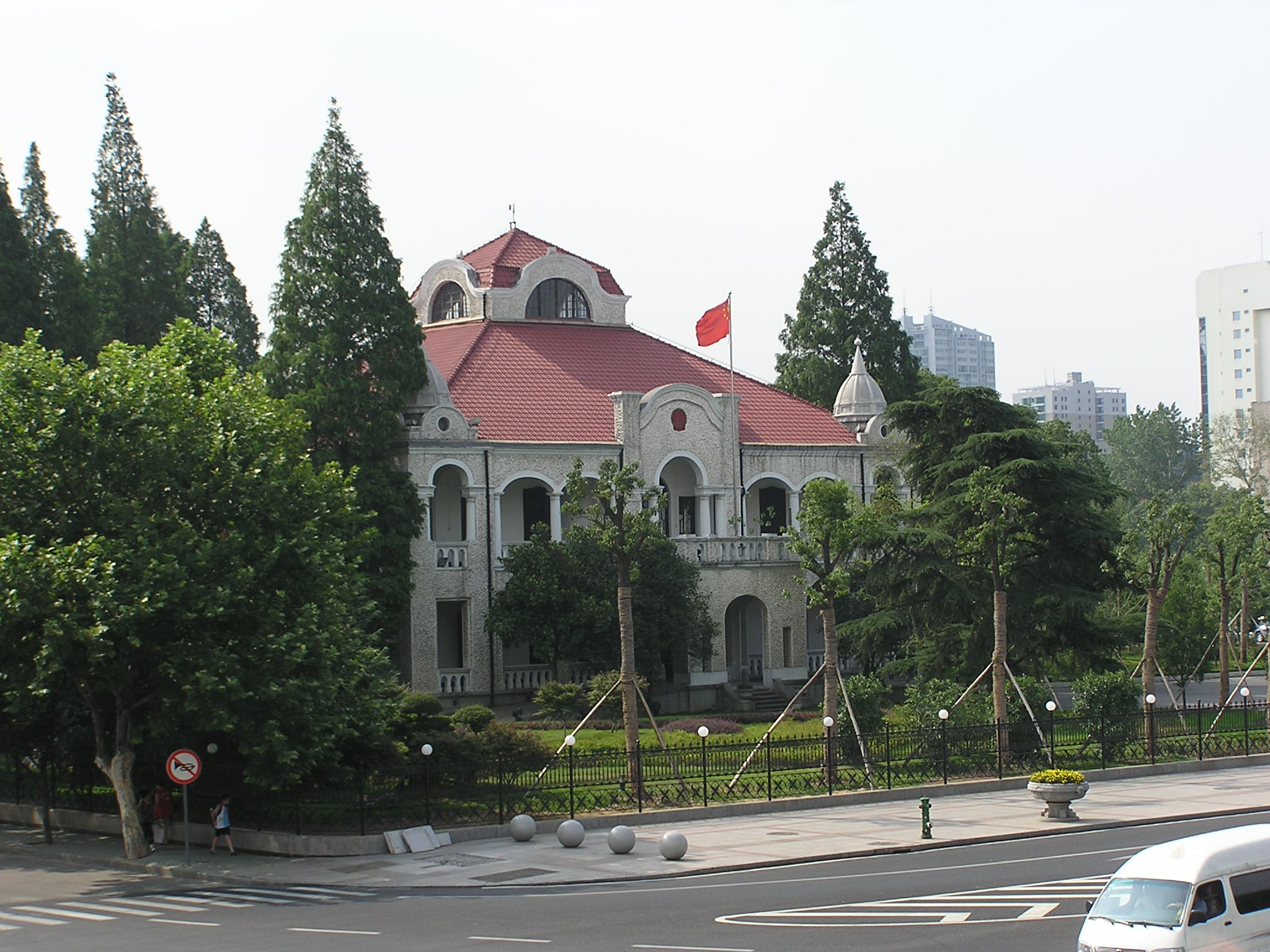
The former German consulate in Wuhan, 2009

Hankou was one of the first port cities along the Yangtze to be opened to foreigners in 1861 as a treaty port. The British were the first to establish their own concession in the city, followed by the Germans in October 1895. Georg Franzius, a German naval officer, visited the concession in spring 1897 where he described it as a collection of thatched huts and trees. In his book Kiautschou – Deutschlands Erwerbung in Ostasien, Franzius criticised the German government's lack of interest and desire to cede parts of the concession to private companies.

Development of the German concession was slow initially. On 30 May 1899, the first foundation stone for the first road was laid by Prince Heinrich, the brother of ruling Kaiser Wilhelm II, who was on a tour of China. The road was completed in 1903 and, by 1905, all of the concession's roads had been laid out. In 1906, a municipal council made up of the concession's landowners was established to manage the concession.

German Hankou operated several German businesses that where concerned mainly at producing low-end products such as pig bristles, hides, tallow, wax. In 1907, Melcher & Co. constructed a power station that provided electricity to both the German and Japanese concessions.

The concession had a population of around 300 Germans who lived mainly in the French concession. Additionally, houses were constructed for Chinese residents. The German concession was defended by German police and housed a consulate. The consulate was designed by German architects and began construction in February 1904, finishing in November 1905. The 1900s saw other construction projects around the concession. In 1908 a German-Chinese school was established while a school for Germans opened in 1913. A small protestant church was finished in October 1910.
