= Italian concession of Tianjin =

Territory controlled by the Kingdom of Italy

Coordinates: 39.1350°N 117.1939°E

- 1901–1947
- Flag Coat of arms

- The Italian concession in green Other concessions in light green
- Status: Concession of Italy
- History
  - Concession administered by Italy: 1901
  - The Imperial Japanese Army invades and occupies the Italian concession, later transferring it to the Reorganized National Government of the Republic of China.: 1943
  - The Republic of China gains de facto control over the concession after the Surrender of Japan.: 1945
  - De jure control of the concession is transferred from Italy to China: 1947
- Currency: Italian yuan
Preceded by	Succeeded by
Qing Dynasty	1943; Wang Jingwei regime; 1945; Republic of China

The Italian concession of Tianjin (Chinese: 天津意租界; pinyin: Tiānjīn Yì Zūjiè, Italian: Concessione italiana di Tientsin) was a small territory (concession) in central Tianjin (formerly romanized as Tientsin), China, controlled by the Kingdom of Italy between 1901 and 1943, officially ceded to China in 1947.

== Characteristics ==
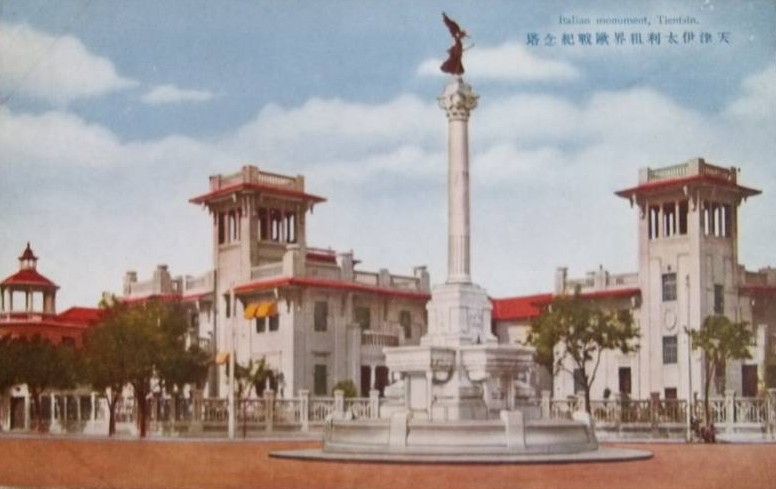
The Italian World War I monument and the Piazza Regina Elena in the Italian Concession of Tientsin (ca. 1935)

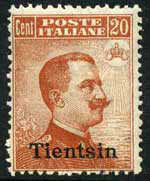
Italian postage stamp for Tientsin

On 7 September 1901, Italy was granted a concession of 46 hectares (114 acres) in Tientsin from the Chinese government. On 7 June 1902, the Italians took control of the concession, which was to be administered by an Italian consul. The Italian Regia Marina ("Royal Navy") stationed vessels at Tientsin such as the river gunboats Ermanno Carlotto and Sebastiano Caboto.

In 1917, during World War I, the Republic of China terminated both the German Empire's lease of the German concession of Tianjin and Austria-Hungary's lease of the Austro-Hungarian concession of Tianjin. The two districts were converted into "Special Areas" under Chinese control, with a separate administration from the rest of Tientsin.

The Italian concession became the headquarters of the Italian Legione Redenta that fought in 1919 during the Allied intervention against Red Army troops in Siberia and Manchuria during the Russian Civil War. After the end of World War I, Italy requested control of the Second Special Area (the territory of the former Austro-Hungarian concession) and obtained it in 1920, which doubled the size of the Italian concession. Italy returned the Second Special Area to the Chinese authorities when it was in danger of coming under attack and occupation during the Chinese Civil War.

In 1935, the Italian concession had a population of about 6,261, including 110 Italian civilians and about 536 foreigners. It was the refuge of many rich Chinese families escaping from Japanese forces after the Second Sino-Japanese War began in 1937.

== History ==
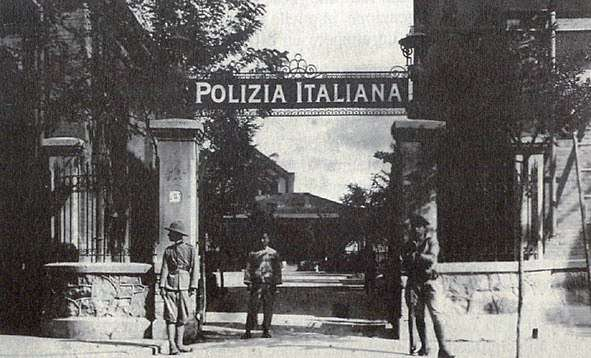
Italian police in Tianjin

During the Boxer Rebellion in 1900, the Beijing Legation Quarter became the center of an international incident during the Siege of the International Legations by the Boxers for several months. After the siege had been broken by the Eight-Nation Alliance (that included Italy) at the end of the Battle of Peking, the foreign powers obtained the right to station troops to protect their legations under the terms of the Boxer Protocol. In addition, Italy obtained the concession in Tientsin, southeast of Beijing.

On 7 September 1901, a concession in Tientsin was ceded to the Kingdom of Italy by the Qing dynasty of China. On 7 June 1902, the concession was taken into Italian possession and administered by an Italian consul: the first was Cesare Poma and the last (in 1943) was Ferruccio Stefanelli.

Along with the other foreign concessions, the Italian concession lay on the Pei Ho, southeast of the city centre.

In the late 1920s, the Italians even held small forts such as the Forte di Shan Hai Kuan near the Great Wall of China in Manchuria and in Hankow.

In 1925, Benito Mussolini created the Battaglione italiano in Cina and quartered it with soldiers of the San Marco Regiment in the new Caserma Ermanno Carlotto. The police were Chinese, while the officers were Italians. There was even a football team in the Italian concession.

During World War II, the Italian concession in Tientsin had a garrison of approximately 600 Italian troops. On 9 September 1943, after the publication of the Italian armistice with the Allies, the concession was occupied by the Imperial Japanese Army following the resistance from Italian forces. The Italian prisoners would be interned at Tangshan. In November, they were given the choice to give their allegiance to Mussolini's new Italian Social Republic. Those that did had their personal weapons returned and were used by the Japanese as labour troops.

In July 1944, the Italian Social Republic formally relinquished the concession to Wang Jingwei's Japanese-sponsored Reorganized National Government of China which, like the RSI in Axis-held northern Italy, was not recognized by the Kingdom of Italy, the Republic of China, or most other nations. The Wang Jingwei government fell when the Empire of Japan was defeated. At the same time, the Italian commercial concessions in the Shanghai International Settlement, Hankou, and Beijing were ceded to the Republic of China.

On 2 June 1946, the Kingdom of Italy became the Italian Republic and, on 10 February 1947, by virtue of the peace treaty with the Allied powers, the Italian concession was formally ceded by Italy to Chiang Kai-shek's Republic of China.

== Governors ==
During the Italian presence, the following governors succeeded each other:

- Cesare Poma (1901–1903)
- Giuseppe Chiostri (1904–1906)
- Oreste Da Vella (1906–1911)
- Vincenzo Fileti (1912–1920)
- Marcello Roddolo (1920–1921)
- Luigi Gabrielli di Quercita (1921–1924)
- Guido Segre (1925–1927)
- Luigi Neyrone (1927–1932)
- Filippo Zappi (1932–1938)
- Ferruccio Stefenelli (1938–1943)

== Maps ==
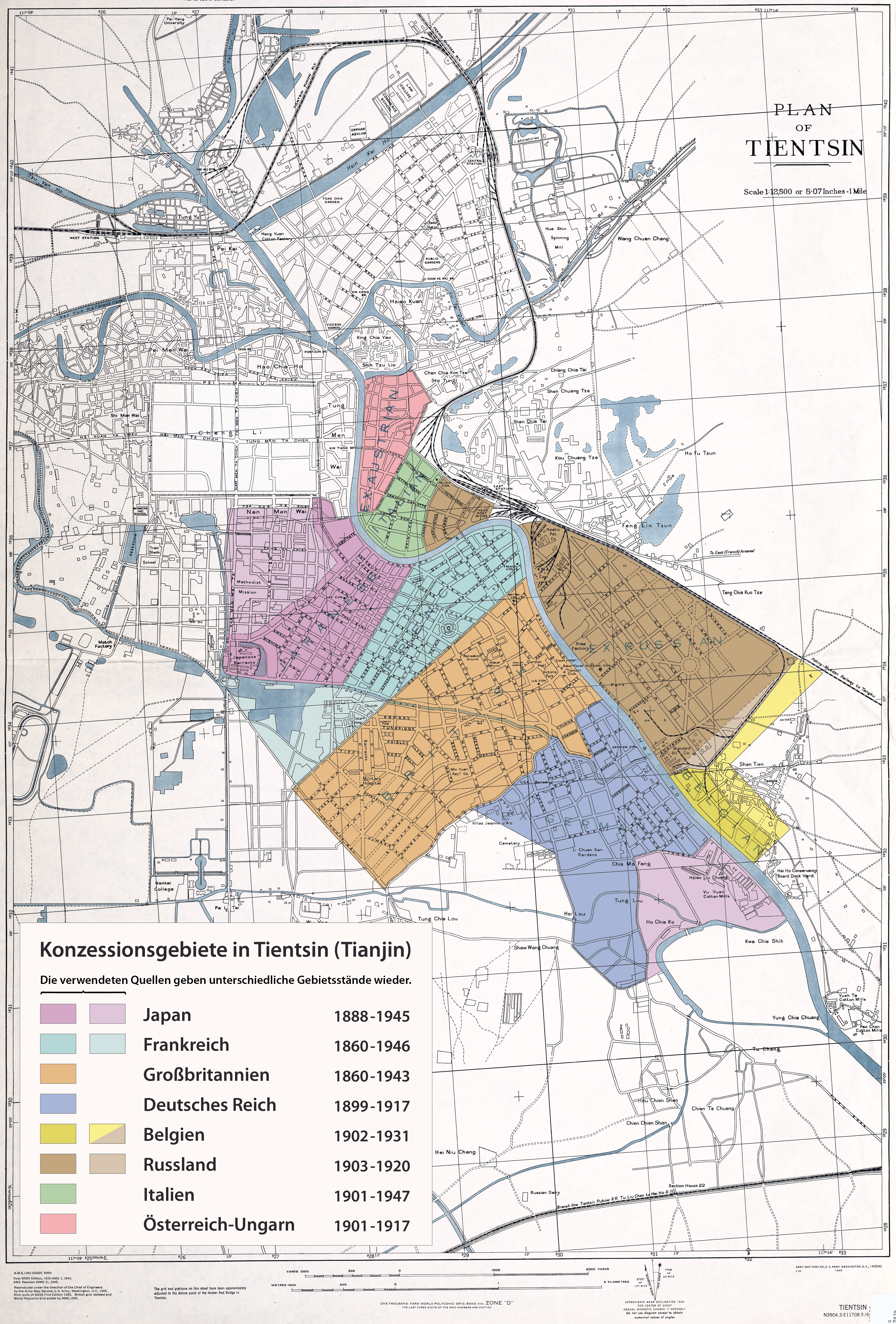
Foreign concessions in Tientsin in 1912 showing the Italian concession. The adjacent Austro-Hungarian concession of Tianjin was added to the Italian concession after World War I

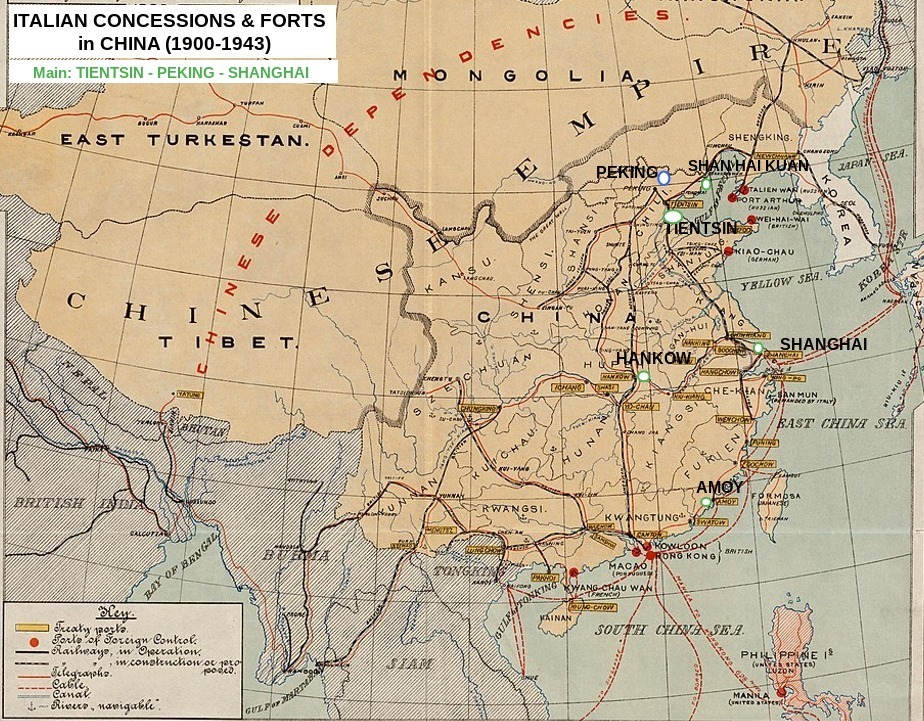
Italian concessions & forts in China. Additionally, there were, together with other colonial powers: Taku (fort with Great Britain) and Beihai (only port commerce rights). However, the one with full and sole colonial control by Italy was Tientsin)

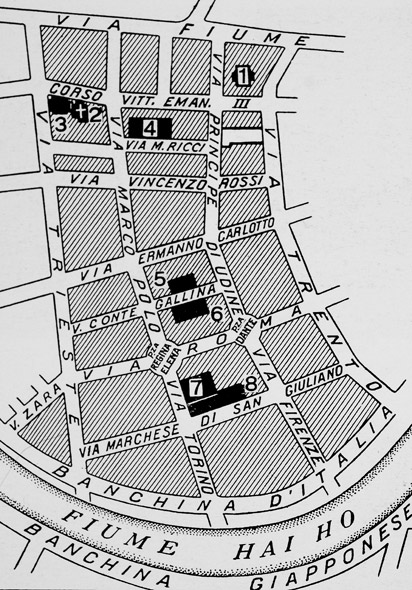
Street map of the Italian concession

== Extant buildings ==
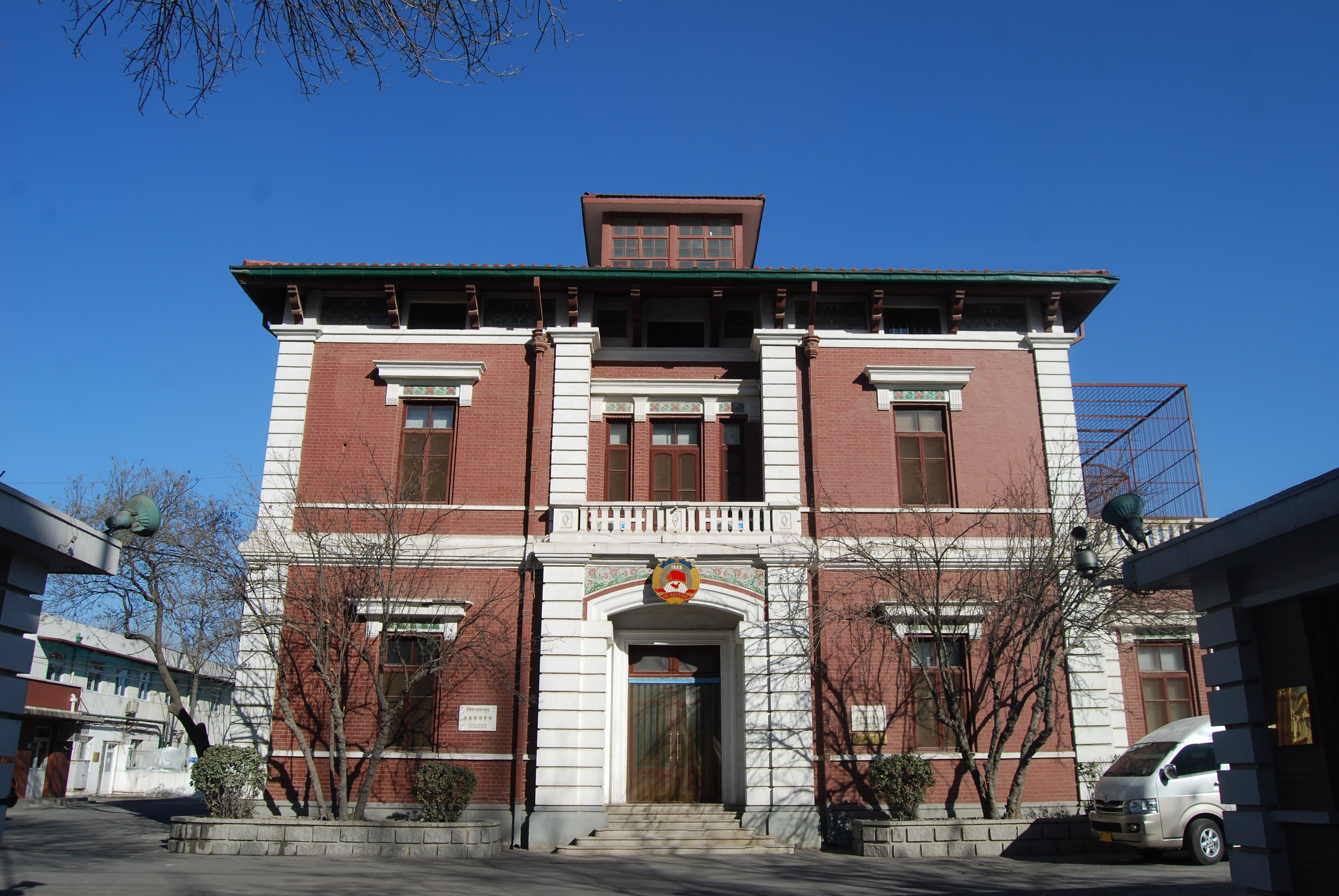
The Italian consulate, built in 1916

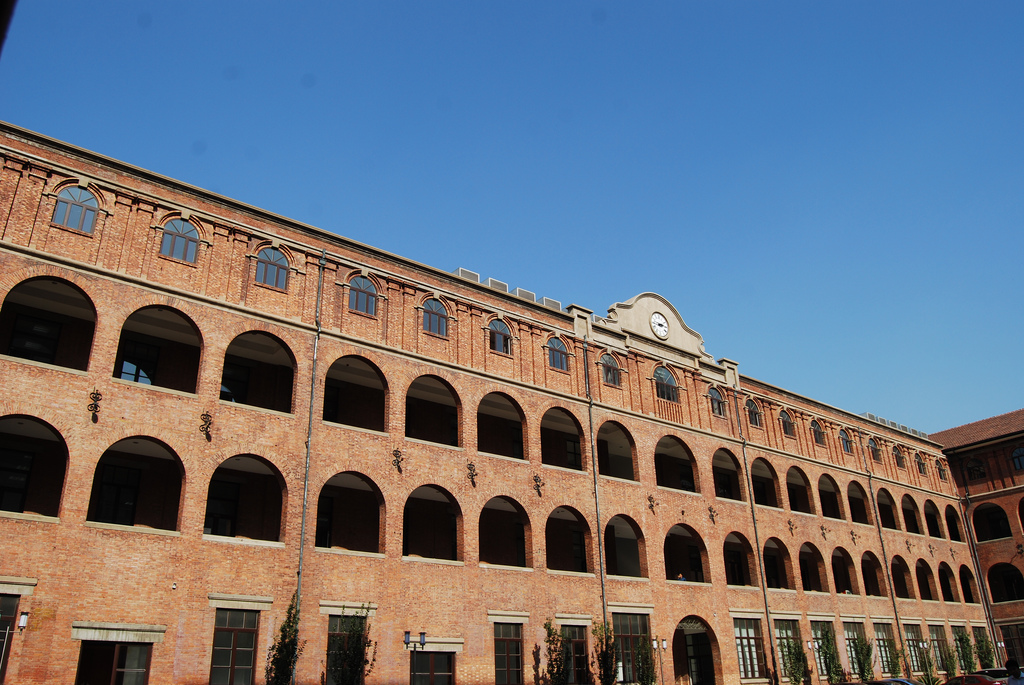
Italian barracks, built in 1916

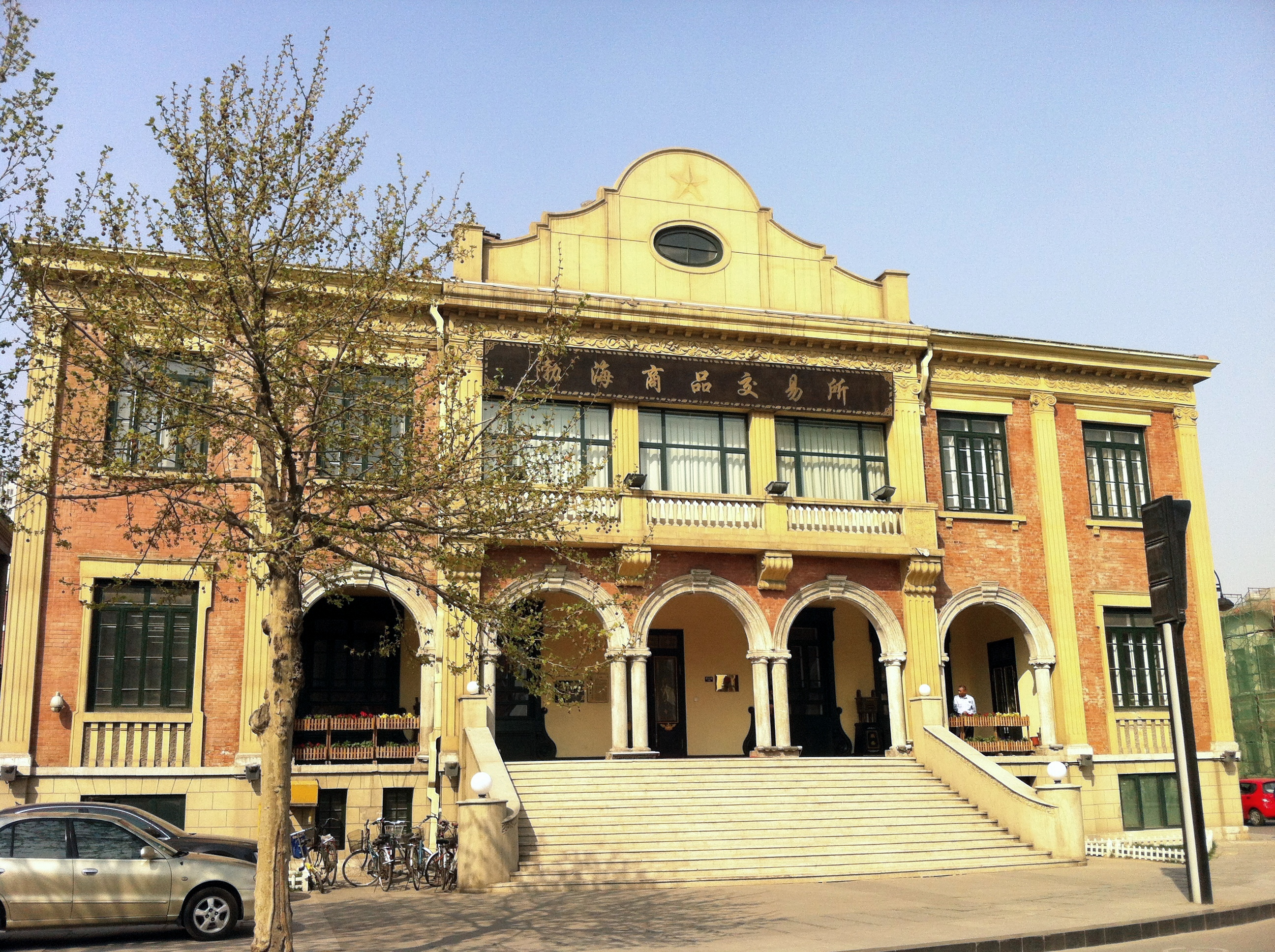
Former residence of Cao Kun

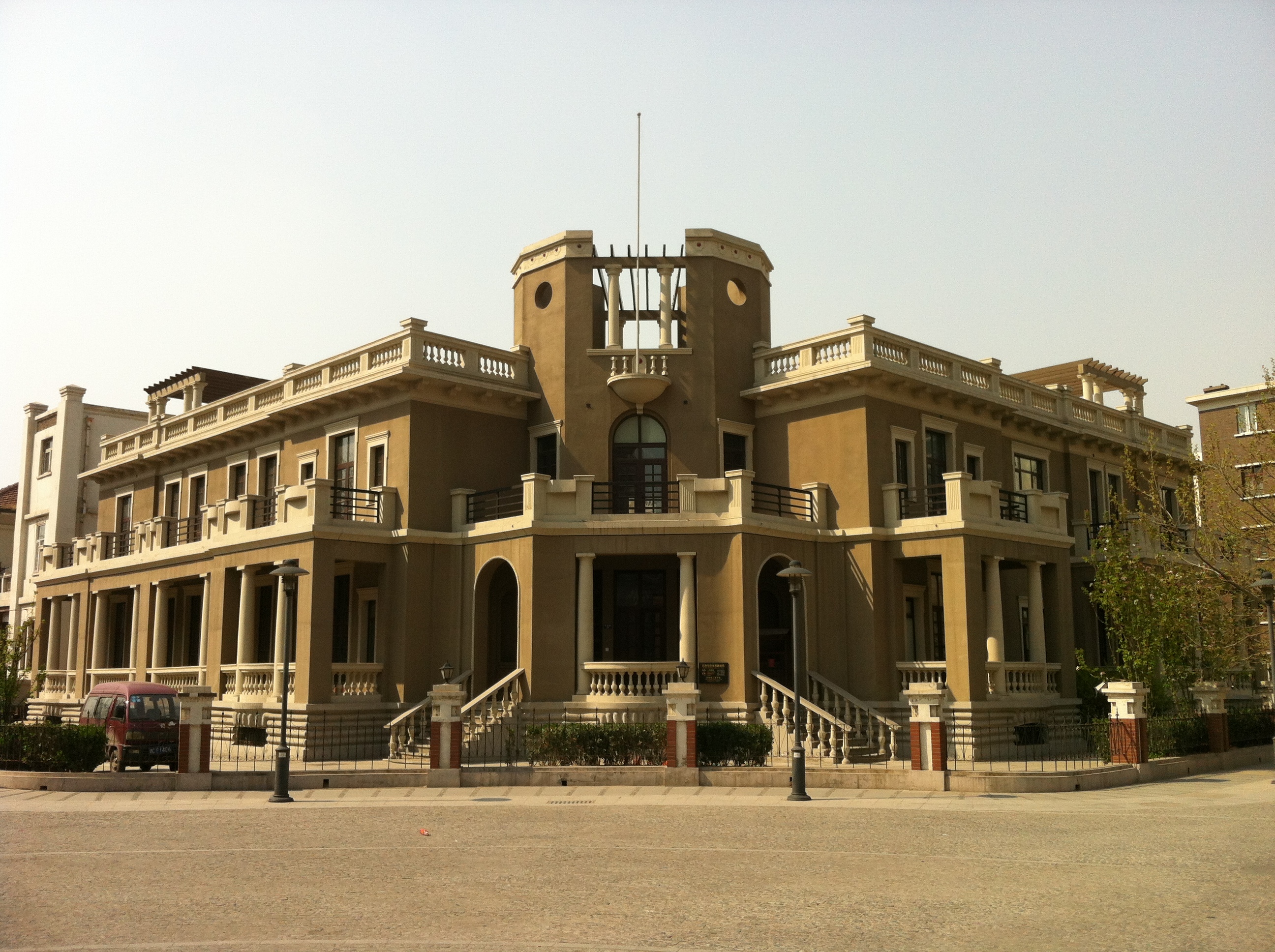
North China Conservancy Commission

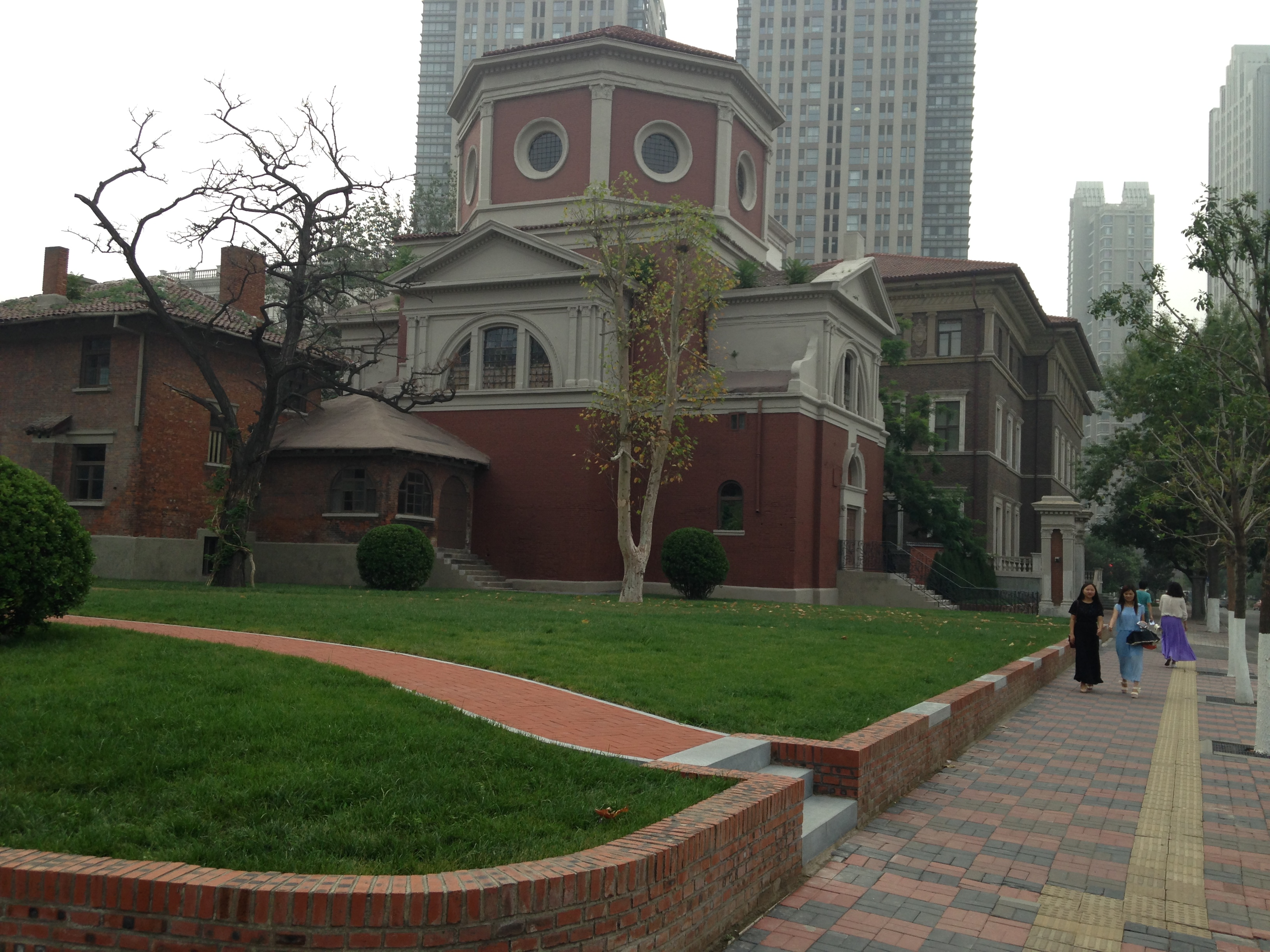
Sacred Heart Church, built in 1922

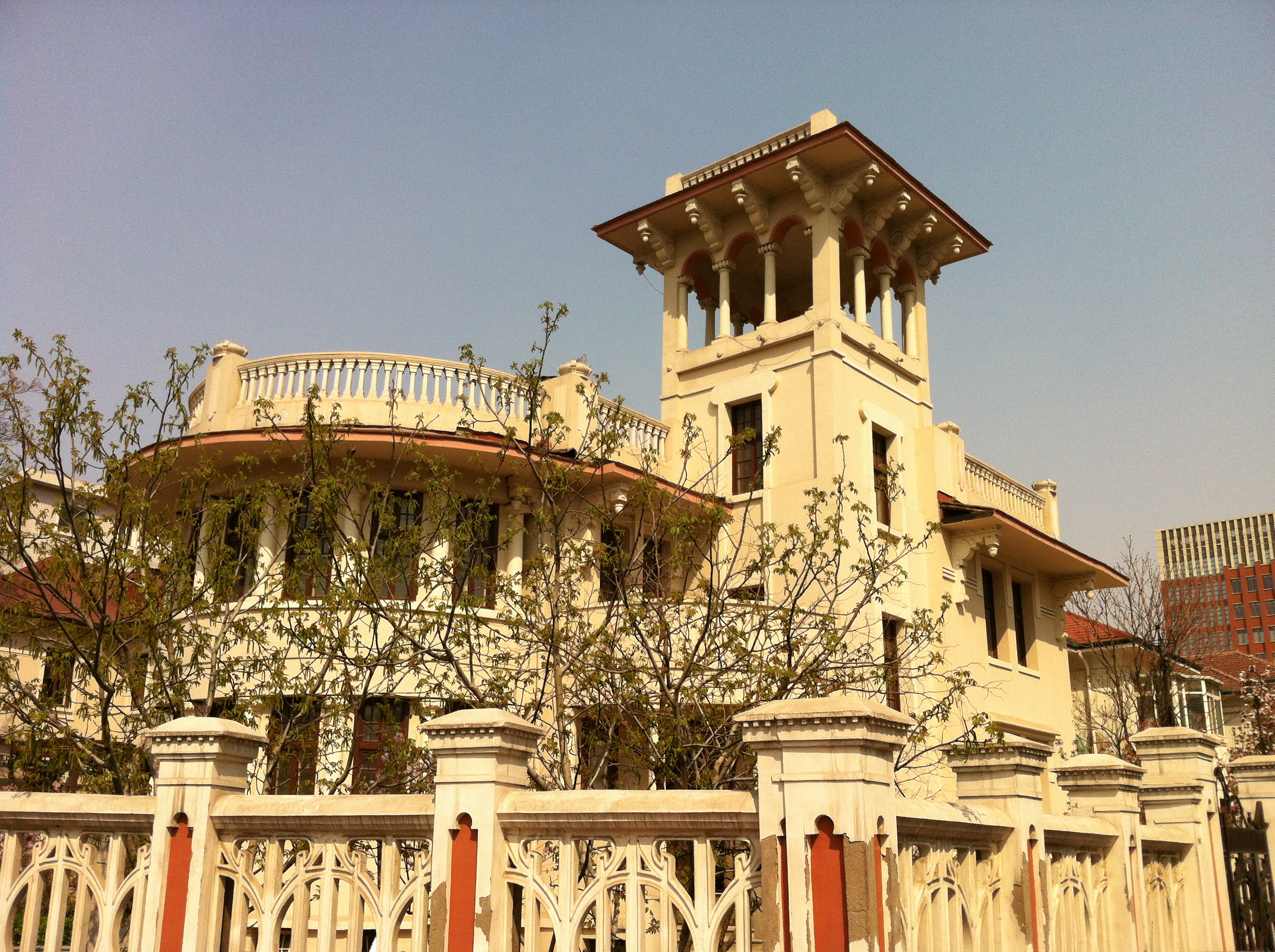
A mansion near Piazza Regina Elena

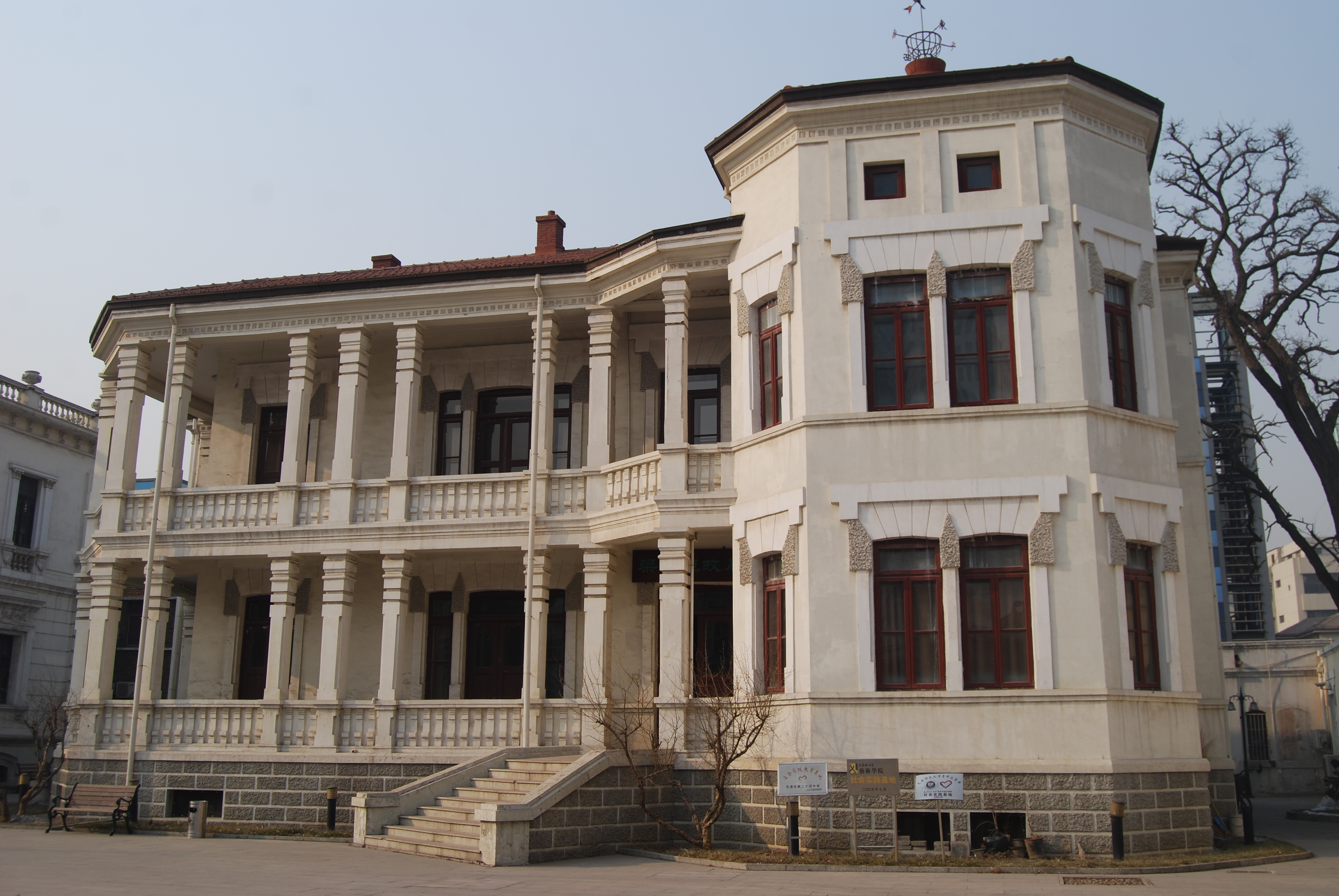
A mansion, former residence of Liang Qichao

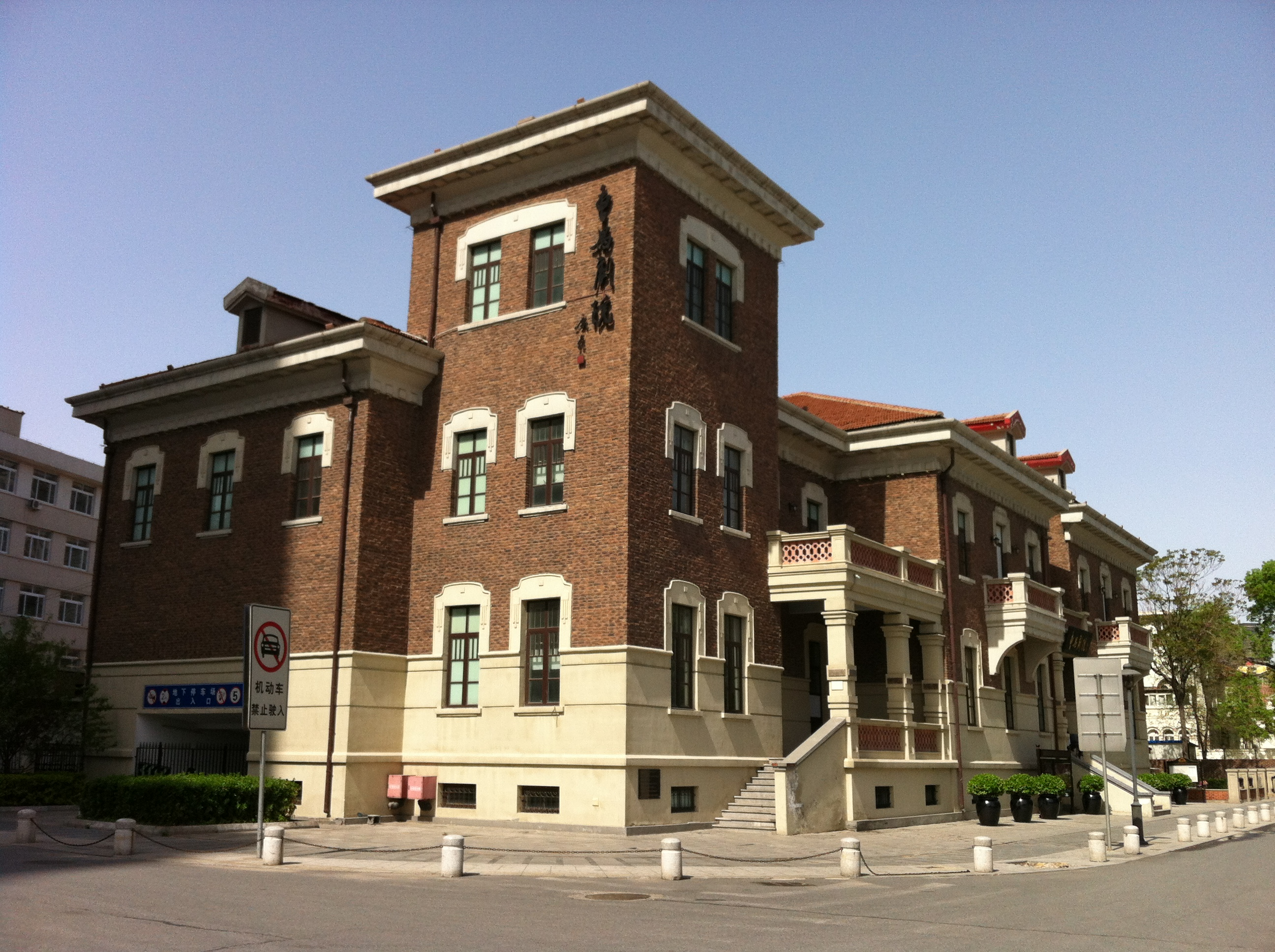
Italian Theatre in Hebei District, Tianjin

== See also ==
- Concessions in Tianjin
- Concessions of Italy in China
- Map of concessions in Tianjin (in Chinese)
- Italian Empire
- List of former foreign enclaves in China
- Italian yuan

== Bibliography ==
- Cucchi, Giuseppe. Una bandiera italiana in Cina, Rivista Militare, n. 6/1986.
- De Courten, Ludovica, Sargeri, Giovanni. Le Regie truppe in Estremo Oriente, 1900-1901. Ufficio Storico Stato Maggiore dell’Esercito, Roma, 2005.
- Dikötter, Frank. The Age of Openness China before Mao University of Chicago Press. Berkeley, 2008 ISBN 9780520258815.
- Donati, Sabina. Italy’s Informal Imperialism in Tianjin during the Liberal Epoch, 1902-1922, The Historical Journal, Cambridge University Press, 2016, available on CJO2016, doi:10.1017/S0018246X15000461.
- Grasselli, Enrico. L’esercito italiano in Francia e in Oriente Corbaccio ed. Milano, 1934.
- Marinelli, Maurizio, Andornino, Giovanni. Italy's Encounter with Modern China: Imperial dreams, strategic ambitions, New York: Palgrave Macmillan, 2014.
- Marinelli, Maurizio. “The Triumph of the Uncanny: Italians and Italian Architecture in Tianjin”, In Cultural Studies Review, Vol. 19, 2, 2013, 70–98.
- Marinelli, Maurizio. “The Genesis of the Italian Concession in Tianjin: A Combination of Wishful Thinking and Realpolitik”. Journal of Modern Italian Studies, 15 (4), 2010: 536–556.
- Mautone, Antonio. Trentini ed Italiani contro l'Armata Rossa. La storia del corpo di spedizione in Estremo Oriente e dei Battaglioni Neri. Temi editrice. Trento, 2003.
