= Cesare Poma =

Italian diplomat, numismatist and historian

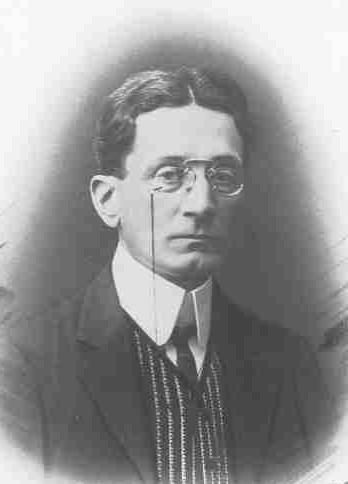
Cesare Poma

Cesare Poma (1862–1932) was an Italian philologist, essayist, and diplomat.

== Biography ==
Cesare Poma was born in Biella in 1862. A philologist and writer, he received a doctorate in law from the University of Turin, later entering the consular career.

His works include "Der alto: appunti linguistici" (1882), "Il dialetto di Ayas" (1884), "Gli Statuti del comune di Biella del 1245" (1885), "Di un giornale in guaraní e dello studio del tupi nel Brasile" and "Le orchidee del Messico" (1897).

In the Universal Illustrated European-American Encyclopedia he appears as "César Poma". He died in Biella in 1932.

He was also the first Italian consul in the Italian concession in Tianjin, from 1901 to 1904. In those years he created and published the "Bollettino Italiano" (written in Italian, English and Chinese).

== Bibliography ==
- Poma (César). Enciclopedia universal ilustrada europeo-americana XLVI. Barcelona, 1922.

== See also ==
- Italian concession in Tianjin
