= Trams in Tianjin =

Transport system in Tianjin, China

Tianjin, a major port and industrial center in China. Tianjin once had a standard steel-wheeled tramway network. But the original tram service was completely stopped in 1973. In 2006, tram service returned to Tianjin in the form of the TEDA Modern Guided Rail Tram.

== History ==
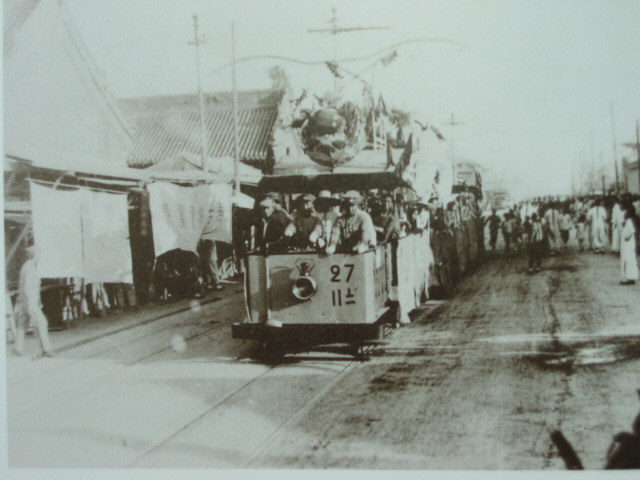
The first tram of Tianjin in 1906

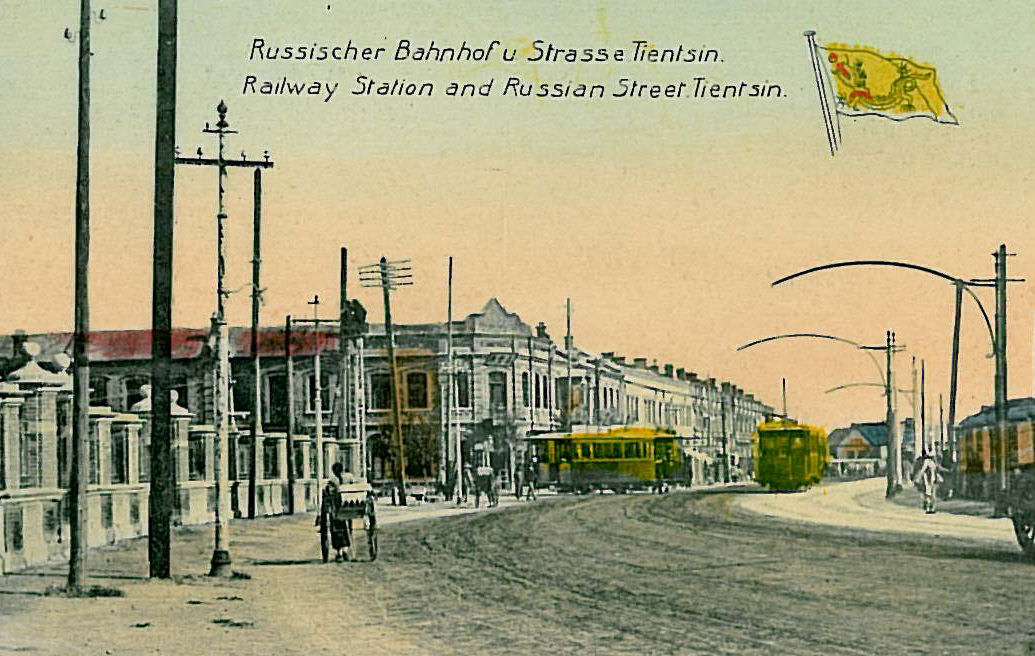
Postcard of Tianjin trams

Tianjin was the first city to have its own citywide tram system (operated by Municipal Corporation) in China. It was the second electric tramway of mainland China, third if the at the time British colonized Hong Kong was counted and is one of the oldest tram networks in Asia. It was built by Belgian interests during the foreign concession period in 1901, and recognized by the Chinese authorities in 1904. Electric trams were put in place on 16 February 1906. The first line was 5.16 km (3.21 mi) long and single track and was double tracked in 1907. A second line opened in 1908. Routes were gradually added, reaching five lines by 1918 and peaking in 1946 with eight lines.

Buses were introduced by the municipality in 1932. But from the mid-1950s, traffic congestion on the tram network grew rapidly with the increasing number of private cars. From 1964 to 1973, Tianjin gradually demolished all its tram lines.

=== Timeline ===
- 1906 – Electric tram started running from 16 January.
- 1933 – Tram service expanded to 14.4 km.
- 1972 – The last tram ran.
- 2006 – Tram returned as modern rubber tired system in TEDA area of Tianjin.

== Tram routes ==
Beside electric trams, a horse tramway was also constructed, which connected the city with a large arsenal to the east.

== Fleet ==
When first tram opened, all stocks were open type. There were only minimal roof, mostly top opened. Around 1930, newer stocks arrived. Windows added, and a more closed trailer was introduced especially in the peak hours.

== See also ==
- TEDA Modern Guided Rail Tram – The first rubber tired tram in Asia
- Zhangjiang Tram, rubber tired tram of Shanghai (similar to Tianjin's current system)
- Tianjin Metro
- Dalian tram
- Hong Kong tram
