= Foreign concessions in Hankou =

Former concession territories in Wuhan, China

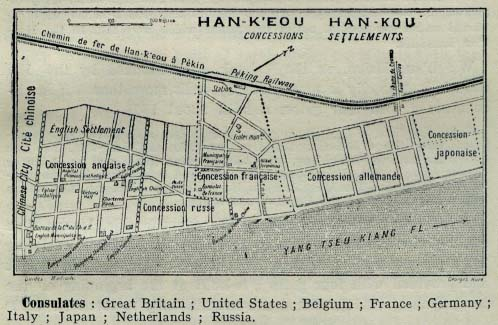
Map of the concessions in 1912. From left to right they are: the British, the Russian, the French, the German and the Japanese areas.

Location of the foreign concessions within China

Several European nations and Japan held foreign concessions in the city of Hankou (now part of Wuhan) in China from 1861 to 1943. Foreign concessions were present in other Chinese cities, particularly Shanghai and Tianjin, but Hankou was the only city in China's interior to have concession areas. The five concession areas belonged to Britain, Germany, France, Russia and Japan, which were all lined up together along the Hankou Bund.

Britain was the first to establish a concession in 1861, with the other four nations establishing them in the 1890s. Their establishment was driven by a combination of economic interests and prestige. The Hankou concessions were smaller than their coastal counterparts. At most, 1,500 foreigners resided in the concession zones. After World War I and the Russian Revolution, the German and Russian concessions were lost. In 1927, the British conceded leaving only the French and Japanese. Following the Japanese occupation of Wuhan in 1938, the French concession became isolated. In 1943, both the Japanese and French concessions were dissolved. Much of the architecture of the concessions remains in modern-day Hankou.

== History ==
The first foreign concession established in Hankou was by the British in March 1861 following their victory in the Second Opium War against Qing China. The 1858 Treaty of Tientsin had opened more of China and the Yangtze to foreign trade. It remained the sole concession until after the Treaty of Shimonoseki in 1895 that allowed foreigners to more freely travel into the Chinese interior. Four more concessions were then established: Germany's in October 1895, Russia's and France's in June 1896, and Japan's in July 1898. Each concession were laid side by side together in the northern part of Hankou.

Through the purchase of private Chinese land and negotiations with the Qing government, the British expanded by a third of its original size to become the largest concession. Displeased that the French had no easy access to the railways, consul Chassain de Marcilly negotiated with daotai Qin Fuzhuang to expand the French concession in November 1902. This expansion forced the Chinese to dismantle portions of the wall separating the concession and Chinese zones. The Japanese had also purchased Chinese land around their concession, which consul Mizuno Kokichi used to argue for expansion. The Japanese concession was expanded on 9 February 1907 to gain 250,000 square metres (62 acres), becoming the second largest.

The purchase of Chinese land by Westerners was illegal. The most wanted land were in the northern outskirts of Hankou near the Peking-Hankou railway, lands that were predominately rural. In 1898, the Jianghan daotai ordered the magistrate of Jiangxia County to investigate the purchases. Things didn't improve, with Belgium trying to establish its own concession in 1898 after illegally purchasing land. Mingling between foreigners and the Chinese was also restricted. The foreign concessions were initially isolated from Chinese Hankou by a wall until the concessions were expanded. Chinese were prohibited from entering or engaging in business in the concessions, whilst foreigners need permission to enter the Chinese area.

=== World War II ===
By the beginning of the Second Sino-Japanese War in 1937, only the French concession continued to operate in a very isolated position. After the Battle of Wuhan, the Japanese occupied the city on 25 October 1938, leaving the concession in an even more isolated position.

== The concessions ==
=== British (1861-1927) ===
The British established the first concession in Hankou in 1861. It was originally 309,000 square metres (76 acres). In 1865, a river bund was established for flood protection. The concession grew fast and attracted many merchants. Around 1892, the British concession had a population of 374 foreigners who were mainly officials, merchants and missionaries.

Near the end of the 19th century, the British concession was expanded towards the city's north-western wall, where upon the Municipal Council began to acquire land from Chinese and European residents.

=== German (1895-1917) ===
The German concession existed from 1895 up until 1917.

=== Russian (1896-1925) ===
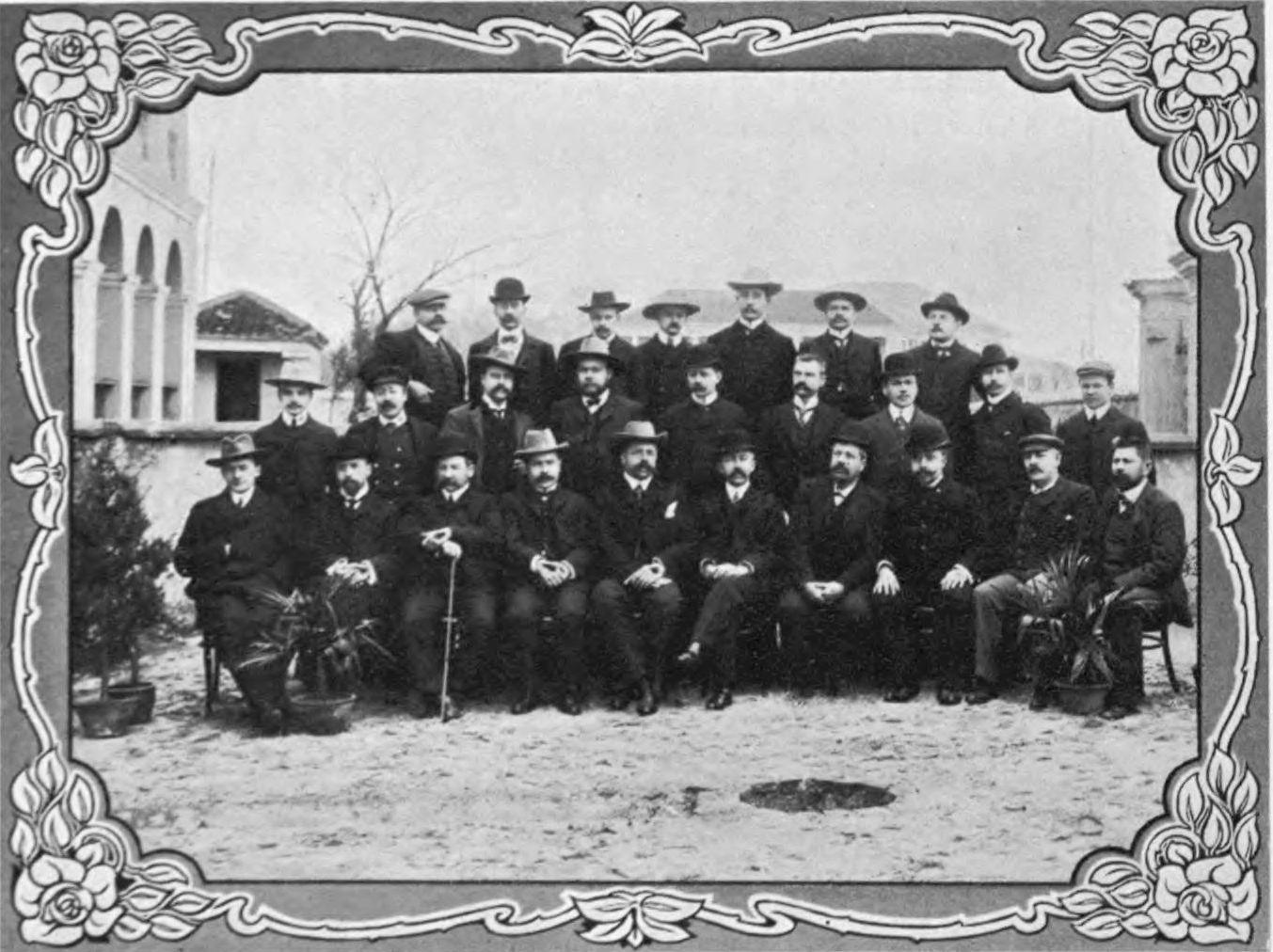
Members of the Russian Club in 1908

The Russian concession in Hankou was established on 2 June 1896. At its establishment, there was little economic motivation behind a Russian concession. Instead, the concession was an attempt by Russia to assert its reputation as a great power. However, Russians have maintained an economic presence around the Wuhan area since the conclusion of the Second Opium War. In 1863, a Russian brick tea factory was founded outside the British concession. By the 1890s, Russian traders had a monopoly over the tea market in the middle and lower Yangtze areas, which was one of Hankou's largest industries. In 1894, they were responsible for 85% of tea leaves being directly exported. Despite an important trade presence, Russia did not process the same political influence in the area as other powers. The Chinese had resisted Russian attempts to establish their own concession in the city, allowing only for a Russian consulate in Hanyang in 1869. In 1891, Crown Prince Nicholas paid a visit to Hankou.

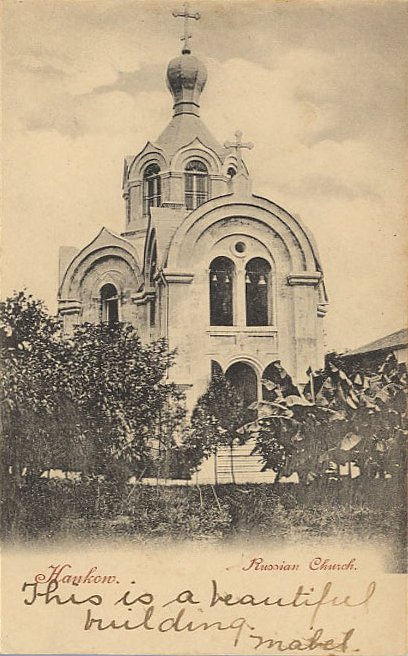
The Hankou Orthodox Church

After China was defeated in the First Sino-Japanese War, Russia was given a lease over Port Arthur and allowed to establish concessions in both Tianjin and Hankou. The Russian concession in Hankou was the largest of all of the five concessions. The concession included paddy fields and Chinese businesses, but continued to remain largely undeveloped. Additionally, it took the Russians six years to evict Chinese residents who resisted their takeover. The dispute was solved in 1902 when the Russians paid Chinese officials to facilitate their removal. From 1902, administrative buildings and roads were constructed and the Russian consulate in Hanyang was relocated. Unlike the other concessions, the Russian concession didn't engage in industries outside of tea, and seldom invested into education or missionary work.

After the Russian government was overthrown by the October Revolution in 1917 and replaced by the Soviet Union (USSR), the concession continued to operate up to 1925. In 1919, Soviet Russia issued the Karakhan Manifesto to China. The Beiyang government subsequently revoked the extraterritorial rights of Russians, seized the Russian consulates and ordered the return of its concessions in Tianjin and Hankou. However, the takeover of the Russian concession was prevented by British, French and American police. On 8 October 1920, the French consulate announced that the French concession would absorb the Russian concession. In the 1924 Sino-Soviet Treaty, the USSR officially renounced its concession territories. The French later handed over the former Russian concession back to China on 1 July 1924, although the takeover de facto didn't happen until 2 March 1925. The Russian consulate became used by Soviet officials.

=== French (1896-1943) ===
The French concession in Hankou was its fourth and last concession gained in China.

=== Japanese (1898-1943) ===
The Japanese concession was the last one established Hankou and one of five Japanese concessions in China. When it was established in 1898, it covered 80 hectares (200 acres) and was expanded to 251.7 hectares (622 acres) in 1907. After the outbreak of the Second Sino-Japanese War in July 1937, all Japanese residents were transported out from the concession in August. On 13 August 1938, the Chinese government officially seized the Japanese concession where it became the Hankou No. 4 Special Zone. After the Japanese victory at the Battle of Wuhan, the Japanese concession was restored. On 30 March 1943, Japan handed over its concession to the Wang Jingwei regime's Chinese government - one of its puppet states.

The Japanese concession was more remote and isolated than the European concessions, being placed furthest from the city's economic centre. The resources of Japanese merchants were limited and business was not as prosperous. Bigger Japanese companies like the Bank of Taiwan and Nissin Steamship were all located in the British concession.

== Economy ==
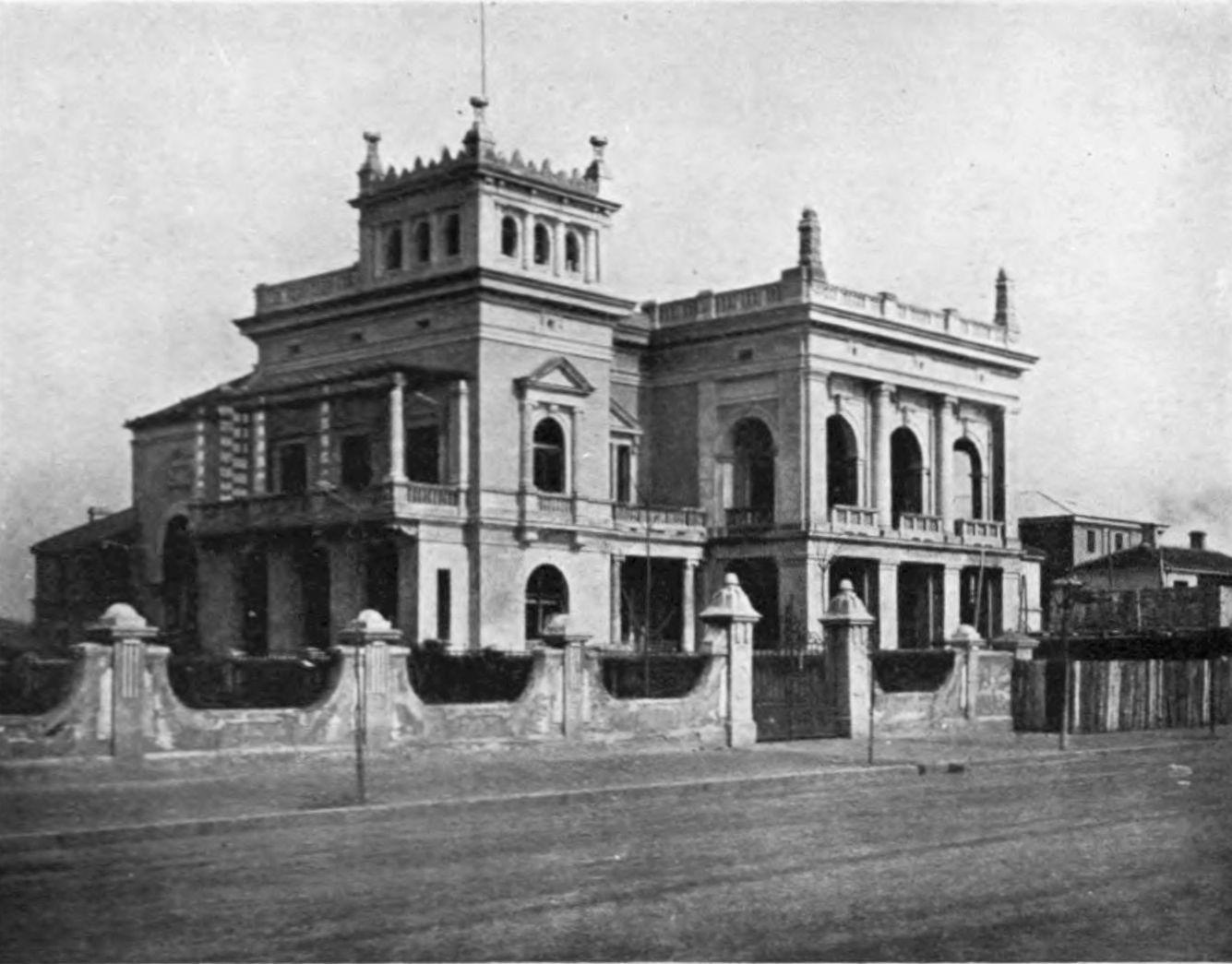
The Deutsch-Asiatische Bank in the German concession.

Russia was the first to establish a factory in the concession zone in 1863, followed then by Britain, Germany, Japan and the United States. These factories took advantage of China's cheap labour and abundant raw materials. The foreigners invested primarily in food processing such as bean oils, eggs, tea, and meat. The tea trade was dominated by the Russians, and eggs and rooibos tea by the British. Cotton, fur and oil were also exported to Germany and Japan. Hankou became a centre for collecting and processing Chinese goods for Western consumption, as well as an outlet for western products to enter China.

A large number of local Hankou workers relied on the foreign factories for work. In the Russian tea factory, 2,000 Chinese were employed.

== Architecture and layout ==
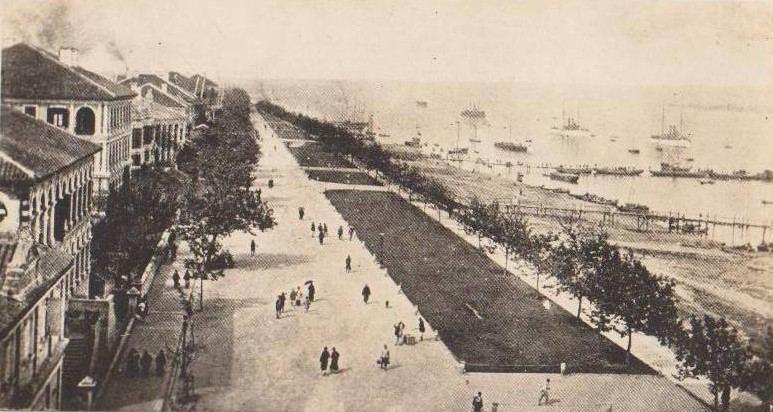
The Hankou Bund where the concessions were all lined up along.

European buildings in the concession area were constructed in a small-scale grid pattern in the shape of a parallelogram. The first priority of the British in 1860s Hankou was the construction of a road system that framed the concession and divided internal blocks. Gingel had divided the British concession into 18 lots further divided into 72 parallelogram-shaped blocks. The diagonal roads of the concession ended up being relatively consistent with the angles of the roads in the Chinese Old Town, with the main considerations being for economy and traffic. In contrast, the Lifen residential areas on the concession's boundaries were irregularly shaped. Lifen architecture is a combination of Chinese and European styles in Wuhan, combining elements of traditional Chinese courtyard residences with European town houses. Unlike the European areas, the Lifen buildings were often unplanned and naturally grew. The foreign and Chinese sections of Hankou were separated initially by a wall.

Like in Shanghai, a 3.6 kilometres (2.2 mi) bund stretched across the waterfront area, running from the British to the Japanese concessions. The concession buildings along the bund were constructed mainly in a neo-classical style, with a few Art Deco buildings. In contrast, the areas outside the concessions were crowded with narrow streets and alleyways. The size of each concession is shown below:

Size of the concessions (rounded to nearest 1000 m²)
Nation	Original area	Expansion date	Area added	Total area
United Kingdom	305,000 square metres (75 acres)	Aug. 1898	225,000 square metres (56 acres)	530,000 square metres (130 acres)
German Empire	400,000 square metres (99 acres)			400,000 square metres (99 acres)
Japan	165,000 square metres (41 acres)	Nov. 1902	250,000 square metres (62 acres)	415,000 square metres (103 acres)
Russian Empire	276,000 square metres (68 acres)			276,000 square metres (68 acres)
France	124,000 square metres (31 acres)	Feb. 1907	203,000 square metres (50 acres)	327,000 square metres (81 acres)

Examples of surviving concession architecture in modern-day Wuhan are shown below.

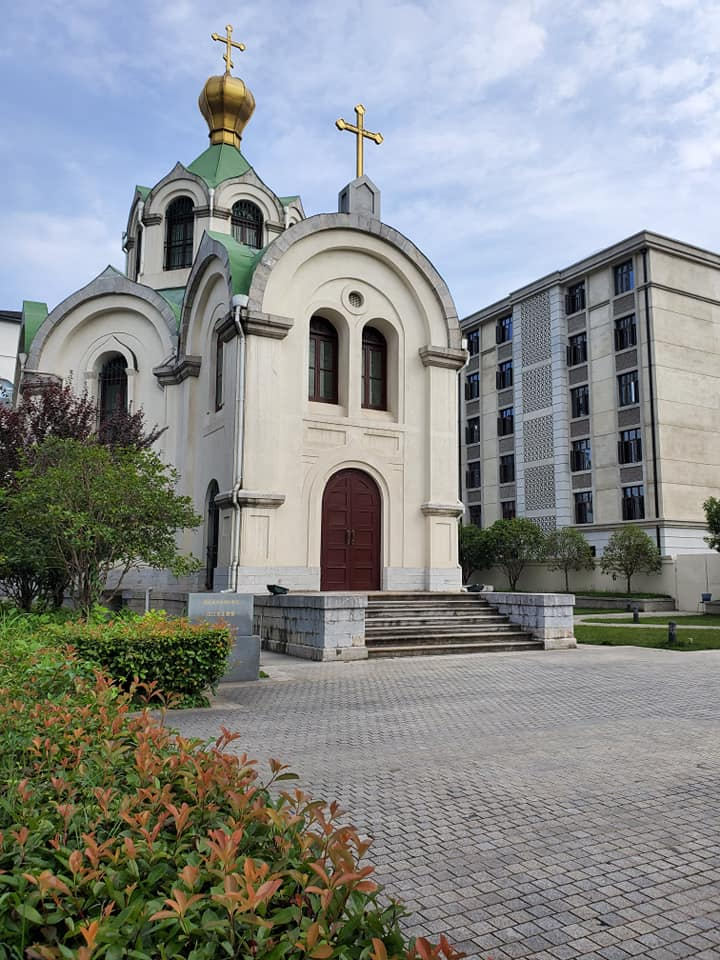
The Russian Orthodox Church

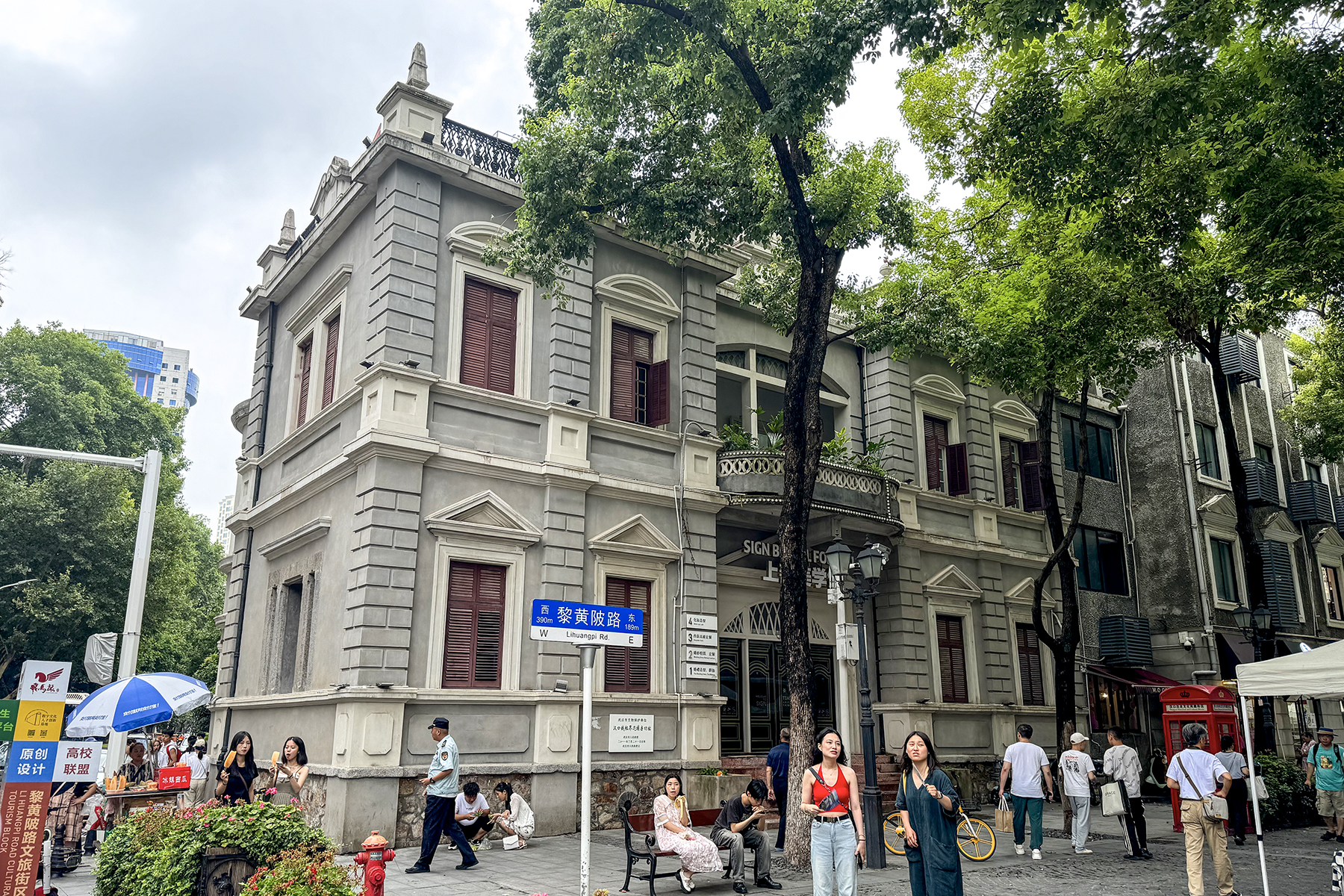
Police station of the Russian concession

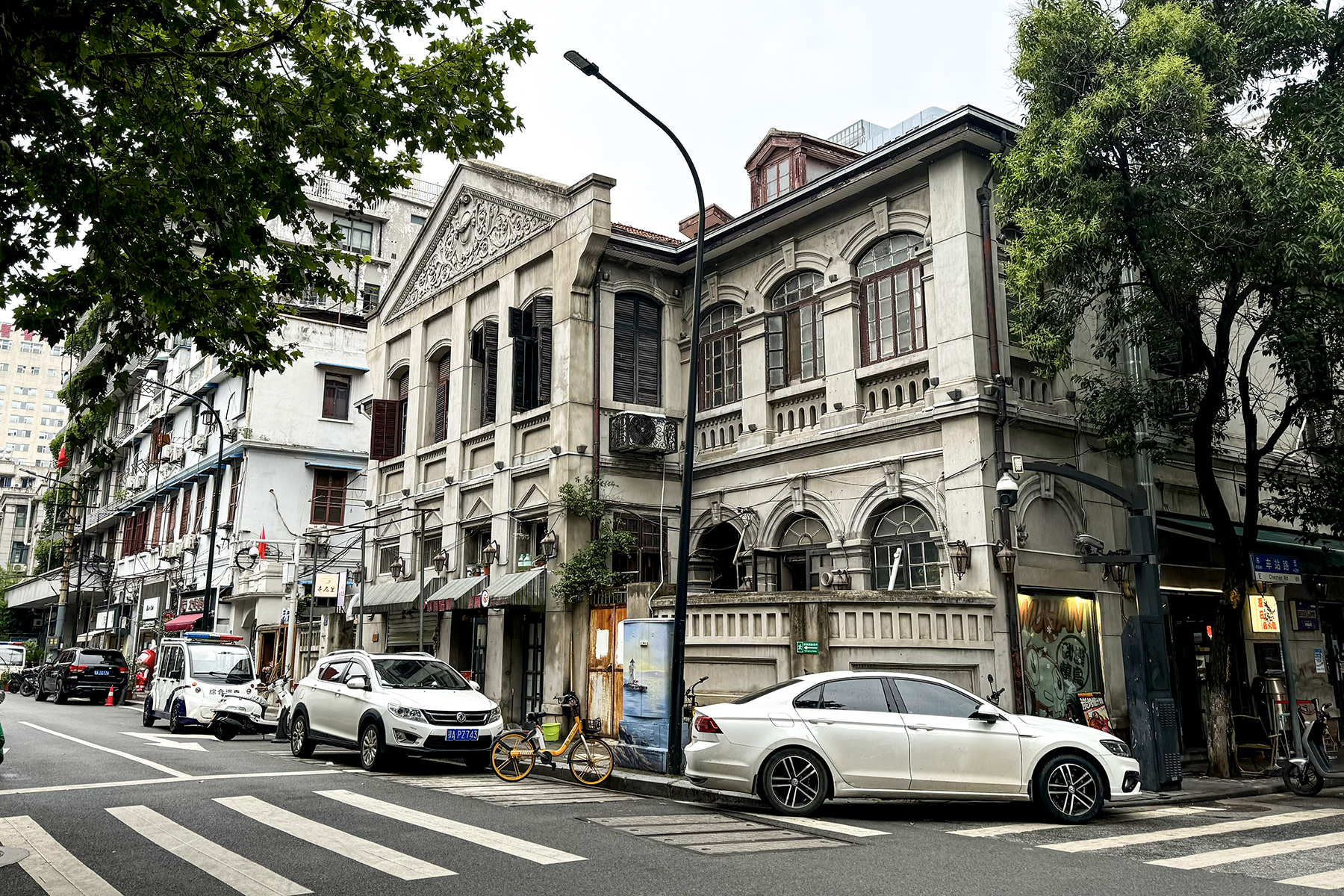
Fire station of the French concession

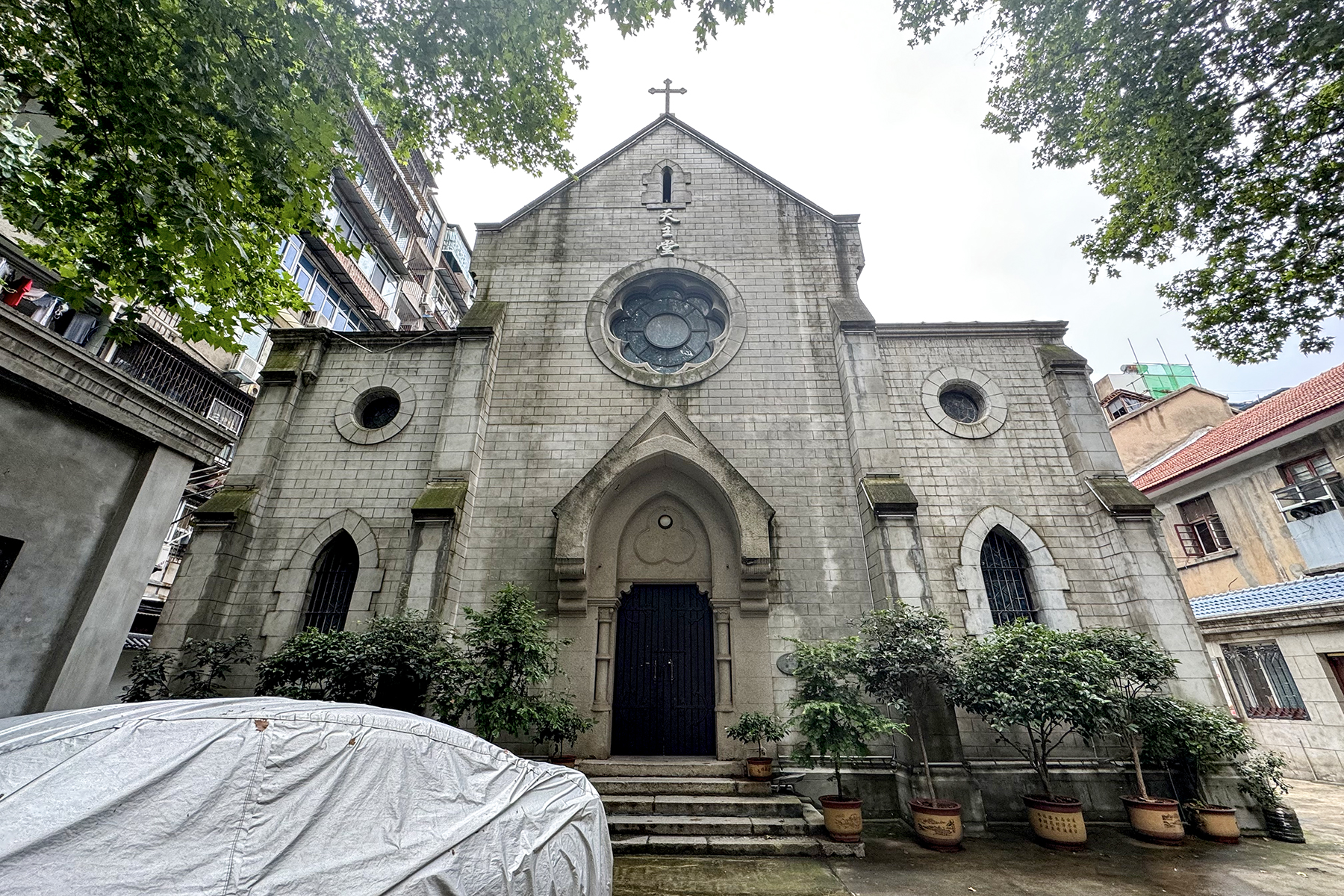
Immaculate Conception Church
