= Flags of Africa =

A map of Africa with national flags, excluding dependent territories and partially recognized states

This is a gallery of the various international, national and subnational flags of Africa.

== Supranational and international flags ==
An incomplete list of flags representing African international and supranational organisations.

Flag	Date	Use	Description
	2017–present	Flag of the African Union	A green flag with the dark green map of the African continent on a white sun, surrounded by a circle of 55 5-pointed gold stars.
Link to flag	2023–present	Flag of the Alliance of Sahel States	A green flag with the AES seal in the center.
	2008–present	Flag of the East African Community	Uneven stripes of white, black, green, yellow, green, red, and white on a sky blue field, with the EAC emblem in the center.
	1975–present	Flag of the Economic Community of West African States	A white flag with the ECOWAS emblem in the center.
	2013–present	Flag of the Organisation of African, Caribbean and Pacific States	Three diagonal bands of green, gold, and blue. In the center is the OACPS logo consisting of the letters "ACP" and three globes.
	1992–present	Flag of the Southern African Development Community	A dark blue flag with the SADC logotype in yellow on a green roundel.

== Flags of African sovereign states ==
Most flags of African nations utilize at least three of the four Pan-African colours of green, yellow, red, and black. The following section lists the flags of all 55 member states of the African Union.

Flag	Date	Use	Description
	1962–present	Flag of Algeria; See also: List of Algerian flags	A vertical bicolour of green and white, charged in the center with a red star and crescent, a symbol of Islam as the nation's prominent faith.
	1975–present	Flag of Angola; See also: List of Angolan flags	A horizontal bicolour of red above black with a yellow emblem in the center consisted of a five-pointed star within a half gear wheel crossed by a machete (resembling the hammer and sickle used on the Soviet flag). As outlined in the Constitution of Angola, the red half of the flag signifies bloodshed – during Angola's colonial period, independence struggle, and in defense of the country. The black half symbolizes Africa. In the central emblem, the gear represents industrial workers and production, the machete represents peasantry, agricultural production and the armed struggle, and the star, shaped like the red star, symbolizes international solidarity and progress. The yellow color of the emblem symbolizes the country's wealth.
	1959–1975; 1990–present	Flag of Benin; See also: List of Beninese flags	A green vertical band on the hoist side, and two horizontal bands of yellow and red on the fly side. As stated in Benin's national anthem, the green of the flag represent the hope of a new democracy. The red represents the courage of the ancestors, and the yellow is for the treasures of the nation. On a continental level, the yellow, green, and red represented the Pan-Africanist movement.
	1966–present	Flag of Botswana; See also: List of Botswanan flags	The light blue represents water—specifically, in the form of rain, as it is a precious resource in Botswana. The blue also alludes to the motto featured on the coat of arms of Botswana—Pula, which means "Let there be rain" in Setswana —as well as life, which is sustained by water. The black band with the white frame has two meanings. Firstly, they symbolise the harmony and cooperation between the people of different races who live in Botswana, as well as the racial diversity of the country. Furthermore, they represent the stripes of the zebra, the national animal of Botswana.
	1984–present	Flag of Burkina Faso	A horizontal bicolour of red and green, with a centred yellow star.
	1982–present	Flag of Burundi; See also: List of Burundian flags	The white color of the saltire represents peace, green represents the nation's hopes placed on future development, and red symbolizes the suffering of the nation during its freedom struggle. The three stars in triangular configuration stand for the three ethnic groups of Burundi: the Hutu, the Twa and the Tutsi. The three stars also stand for the three elements of the national motto: Unité, Travail, Progrès ("Unity, Work, Progress"), which can be seen on the coat of arms of Burundi. They also represent the loyalty that the citizens of the nations have pledged to their God, king and country.
	1975–present	Flag of Cameroon; See also: List of Cameroonian flags	A vertical tricolour of green, red, and yellow, with a centred yellow star.
	1992–present	Flag of Cabo Verde	Blue, with three narrow horizontal stripes of white, red, and white in the lower half of the flag, and a circle of ten gold stars centered on the red stripe, shifted towards the hoist.
	1958–present	Flag of the Central African Republic	Four horizontal bands of blue, white, green, and yellow, crossed in the middle by a vertical red band. There is also a yellow star in the upper hoist.
	1959–present	Flag of Chad	A vertical tricolour consisting (hoist to fly) of a blue, a gold, and a red column. These were intended to be a combination of the colours of blue, white, and red as seen on the flag of France with the Pan-African colours of green, yellow, and red as seen on the flag of Ethiopia. Furthermore, the blue represents the sky and hope; the gold is the sun and desert, and the red signifies the bloodshed over independence.
	2001–present	Flag of the Comoros; See also: List of Comorian flags	Four horizontal stripes of yellow, white, red, and blue (from top to bottom); with a green pile based on the hoist side charged with a white crescent and four five-pointed stars in a line between the points of the crescent.
	2006–present	Flag of the Democratic Republic of the Congo; See also: List of flags of the Democratic Republic of the Congo	Sky blue with a red band edged in yellow running from its bottom inner corner to its upper outer corner. In the canton, there is a single large yellow star.
	1959–1970; 1991–present	Flag of the Republic of the Congo	The colours of the flag carry cultural, political, and regional meanings. The green symbolizes the agriculture and forests of the Congo, while the yellow represents the "friendship and nobility" of the Congolese people. However, the symbolism behind the red was left unexplained. From a continental viewpoint, the green, yellow, and red are the colours of the Pan-Africanist movement.
	1977–present	Flag of Djibouti; See also: List of Djibouti flags	Bisected horizontally between sky blue and green, with a white triangle containing a red star emerging from the hoist.
	1984–present	Flag of Egypt; See also: List of Egyptian flags	Three even horizontal stripes of red, white, and black, with the coat of arms of Egypt in the center.
	1979–present	Flag of Equatorial Guinea; See also: List of flags of Equatorial Guinea	Three even horizontal stripes of green, white, and red. A blue obtuse isosceles triangle points from the hoist. In the center of the flag is the coat of arms of Equatorial Guinea.
	1995–present	Flag of Eritrea; See also: List of Eritrean flags	A red triangle charged with an olive branch and wreath extends along the length of the flag, with a green section above and a blue section below.
	1968–present	Flag of Eswatini	A blue background through which runs a red Spanish fess edged in yellow. On the fess is a black and white shield, two spears, and a staff.
	2009–present	Flag of Ethiopia; See also: List of Ethiopian flags	Three even horizontal stripes of green, yellow, and red, overlaid on which is the emblem of Ethiopia.
	1960–present	Flag of Gabon	A horizontal tricolour of green, yellow, and blue. The yellow alludes to the equator — which cuts across the country — and also symbolizes the sun. The green epitomizes the natural resources of Gabon. The blue represents the sea, specifically the South Atlantic Ocean.
	1965–present	Flag of The Gambia; See also: List of Gambian flags	Three horizontal red, blue, and green bands separated by two thin white stripes. The blue alludes to the Gambia River, which is the nation's key geographical feature and from which the country derives its name. The red evokes the sun – given the Gambia's close proximity to the equator – as well as the savanna, while the thin white stripes represent "unity and peace". The green epitomizes the forest and the agricultural goods that the Gambian people are heavily dependent on, both for exports and their personal use.
	1957–1958; 1963–1964; 1966–present	Flag of Ghana; See also: List of Ghanaian flags	Three even horizontal stripes of red, yellow, and green, with a single black star in the center.
	1958–present	Flag of Guinea; See also: List of Guinean flags	The flag features a simple vertical tricolour of red, yellow, and green.
	1973–present	Flag of Guinea-Bissau	A vertical red stripe on the hoist side charged with a black five-pointed star and two horizontal yellow and green stripes on the fly side. The flag's design is taken from the flag of the African Party for the Independence of Guinea and Cape Verde, while the Pan-African colours of yellow, green, red, and black are taken from the flag of Ghana.
	1959–present	Flag of Ivory Coast	A vertical tricolour of orange, white, and green.
	1963–present	Flag of Kenya; See also: List of flags of Kenya	Three stripes of black, red, and green, separated by thinner white stripes. In the center is a red Maasai shield over two crossed spears.
	2006–present	Flag of Lesotho	Three horizontal stripes of blue, white, and green, with a black mokorotlo in the center.
	1847–present	Flag of Liberia	Eleven horizontal stripes of red and white, with a square blue canton containing a white star. The flag is intentionally visually similar to the flag of the United States, in reference to Liberia's settlement by the African-American freedmen in the early 19th century.
	1951–1969; 2011–present	Flag of Libya; See also: List of Libyan flags	A black Spanish fess with red above and green below, bearing in its center a white crescent and five-pointed star.
	1958–present	Flag of Madagascar; See also: List of Malagasy flags	Bisected horizontally between red and green, with a vertical white bar at the hoist of the flag.
	1964–2010; 2012–present	Flag of Malawi	Three horizontal stripes of black, red, and green. Within the black stripe is a red sunrise.
	1961–present	Flag of Mali; See also: List of Malian flags	The flag is a simple vertical tricolour of green, yellow, and red.
	2017–present	Flag of Mauritania; See also: List of Mauritanian flags	On a field of red, a wide green horizontal stripe bearing a yellow crescent and five-pointed star.
	1968–present	Flag of Mauritius; See also: List of Mauritian flags	Four equal bands; red, blue, yellow, and green. From the National Flag Act 2015: Red represents the struggle for freedom and independence. Blue represents the Indian Ocean in the middle of which Mauritius is situated. Yellow represents the new light of independence. Green represents the agriculture of Mauritius and its colour throughout the 12 months of the year. The flag was designed by Gurudutt Moher whose contribution was recognised posthumously in March 2018 in the form of the national title Member of the Star and Key of the Indian Ocean (MSK). Moher, who was a retired school teacher, died of a heart attack on 7 October 2017, at the age of 93.
	1915–present	Flag of Morocco; See also: List of Moroccan flags	Red with a dark green pentagram in its center.
	1983–present	Flag of Mozambique; See also: List of Mozambican flags	Three horizontal stripes of green, black, and yellow, separated by thin white stripes. Pointing outward from the hoist is a red isosceles triangle containing a yellow star, superimposed on which are a crossed gun and hoe over an open book. The red colour of the triangle represents the blood shed during the struggle for liberation. The black stands for the African continent, green for agriculture, yellow for mineral wealth, and white for peace. The book, hoe, and gun represent education, agriculture, and defense, respectively. The gold star symbolises internationalism, as well as socialism.
	1990–present	Flag of Namibia; See also: List of Namibian flags	A red band edged in white cuts diagonally through the flag from the lower hoist to the upper fly, dividing it into two triangular halves: the upper, blue with a yellow sun; the lower, green.
	1959–present	Flag of Niger; See also: List of Nigerien flags	Three horizontal stripes of orange, white, and green. In the center is a solid orange circle, which is similar to the flag of India's blue wheel.
	1960–present	Flag of Nigeria; See also: List of Nigerian flags	Three vertical stripes. The outermost two are green, and the center stripe is white.
	2001–present	Flag of Rwanda; See also: List of Rwandan flags	The upper half is sky blue and features a yellow sun in its upper fly (outer) corner. The lower half is divided horizontally into yellow and green.
	1975–present	Flag of the Sahrawi Arab Democratic Republic	A horizontal tricolor of black, white, and green charged with a red star and crescent in the center stripe and a red pile at the hoist.
	1975–present	Flag of São Tomé and Príncipe; See also: List of São Toméan flags	A horizontal triband of green, yellow, and green, with two black stars on the yellow band. A red triangle protrudes from the hoist, pointing to the flag's center.
	1960–present	Flag of Senegal	A vertical tricolour of green, yellow, and red, with a green star in the center stripe.
	1996–present	Flag of Seychelles; See also: List of Seychellois flags	Five rays emanating from the lower hoist corner; from upper hoist to lower fly they are blue, yellow, red, white, and green.
	1961–present	Flag of Sierra Leone; See also: List of Sierra Leone flags	A horizontal tricolour of green, white, and blue.
	1954–present	Flag of Somalia; See also: List of Somali flags	Sky blue, featuring a white five-pointed star in its center.
	1994–present	Flag of South Africa; See also: List of South African flags	A green pall, fimbriated yellow on its hoist (inner) edge and white on its upper and lower edges. The area inwards of the pall is black, while the area above is chili red and the region below is blue.
	2023–present	Flag of South Sudan; See also: List of South Sudanese flags	Three horizontal stripes of black, red, and green, separated from one another by thin white stripes. From the hoist protrudes a sky-blue equilateral triangle bearing in its center a yellow five-pointed star.
	1970–present	Flag of Sudan; See also: List of Sudanese flags	A horizontal tricolour of red, white, and black, with a green triangle pointing outwards from the hoist.
	1964–present	Flag of Tanzania; See also: List of Tanzanian flags	Divided diagonally in two by a black band edged in gold. The upper hoist region of the flag is green, while the lower fly region is bright blue. The flag’s black central diagonal band represents the Swahili and African people, the yellow fimbriations symbolize Tanzania’s mineral wealth, the green triangle stands for vegetation and agriculture, and the bright blue triangle reflects the Indian Ocean coastline along with the nation’s lakes and rivers.
	1960–present	Flag of Togo; See also: List of Togolese flags	Five alternating horizontal stripes of green and gold, with a square red canton containing a white five-pointed star.
	1827–present	Flag of Tunisia; See also: List of Tunisian flags	Red, with a white disk in its center. Inside of the disk is a red crescent enveloping a red five-pointed star.
	1962–present	Flag of Uganda; See also: List of Ugandan flags	Six alternating horizontal stripes of black, gold, and red. In the center is a white disk containing a grey crowned crane.
	1964–present	Flag of Zambia	Green, with the lower fly (outer) section divided vertically into red, black, and orange stripes, and above which section is an orange African fish eagle.
	1980–present	Flag of Zimbabwe; See also: List of Zimbabwean flags	Horizontal stripes of green, yellow, red, black, red, yellow, and green again. From its hoist emerges a white triangle edged in black containing the Zimbabwe Bird on a red star.

== Disputed or partially recognised states ==
Flag	Date	Use	State (status)	Description
	1996–present	Flag of Somaliland; See also: List of Somaliland flags	Somalia	A horizontal tricolour of green, white, and red, with the black star of Africa located in the centre. On the green stripe, there is the Shahada in white Thuluth script. The flag's colours are taken from the flag of the Somali National Movement.
	1975–present	Flag of Western Sahara	Morocco (occupied lands); Mauritania (occupied city of La Agüera); Sahrawi Arab Democratic Republic (the Free Zone/Liberated Territories)	A horizontal tricolor of black, white, and green charged with a red star and crescent in the center stripe and a red pile at the hoist.

== Flags of regions of European countries in Africa ==
Flag	Date	Use	State (status)	Description
	1982–present	Flag of the Canary Islands	Spain (autonomous community)	A vertical tricolour of white, blue, and yellow, with the coat of arms of the Canary Islands in the central band.
	1995–present	Flag of Ceuta	Spain (autonomous city)	
	1978–present	Flag of Madeira	Portugal (autonomous region)	
	1982–present	Flag of Mayotte	France (overseas department)	A white flag with the coat of arms of Mayotte in the center. The national flag of France is used for official purposes.
	1995–present	Flag of Melilla	Spain (autonomous city)	
	2003–present	Flag of Réunion	France (overseas department)	The national flag of France is used for official purposes. A regional flag, known as Lö Mahavéli, has no official status but is flown from many public buildings and is widely considered a primary symbol of the island.
	1984–present 2013–present 2002–present	Flags of Saint Helena, Ascension and Tristan da Cunha	United Kingdom (overseas territory)	The overseas territory does not have a flag of its own, using the Union Jack. However, each administrative division of the territory has an official flag—a Blue Ensign charged with the respective territory's coat of arms.

== Flags of African subdivisions ==
=== Comoros ===
Flag	Date	Use	Description
	2012–present	Flag of Anjouan	Four stars inside a crescent centered on a red field.
	2002–present	Flag of Grande Comore	Four stars inside a crescent in the hoist of a blue field.
	2003–present	Flag of Mohéli	A red star on a yellow field.

=== Egypt ===
Flag	Date	Use	Description
	Unknown	Flag of the Sohag Governorate	A green flag depicting Menes inside a cartouche, wearing the double crown of Egypt.

=== Kenya ===
Flag	Date	Use	Description
	2014–present	Flag of Baringo County	Three horizontal stripes, from top to bottom green, gold and brown, separated by thin white stripes. In the center of the flag is a light blue shield over two crossed spears, which shield contains a map of the county and a geyser.
	2014–present	Flag of Bomet County	Three diagonal stripes of light blue, white, and green, with thin green and blue strips along the inside edges of the white. In the center is a red ring inscribed with the words "BOMET COUNTY" in white, surmounted by five gold stars, inside which ring is a map of the county, featuring the same striped pattern as the ground of the flag.
	2015–present	Flag of Bungoma County	Three horizontal stripes of blue, red, and black, separated by thin white stripes, with a green triangle on the hoist side containing the coat of arms of Bungoma County surrounded by nine white five-pointed stars.
	2013–present	Flag of Busia County	Three horizontal stripes of green, white, and blue, with a black gate in the center stripe.
	2014–present	Flag of Elgeyo Marakwet County	Three horizontal stripes of roan, white, and dark green, charged with the coat of arms of Elgeyo Marakwet County in the center.
	2015–present	Flag of Embu County	Two trapezoids, green above gold, separated by a narrow white stripe, with the county logo in the fly.
	2014–present	Flag of Garissa County	Seven horizontal stripes of blue and yellow, with a red isosceles trapezoid in the hoist containing a Hirola encircled by a blue ring inscribed with the words "GARISSA COUNTY" and "HOME OF THE HIROLA".
	2016–present	Flag of Homa Bay County	Three horizontal stripes of orange, blue, and green, charged with the coat of arms of Homa Bay County in the center.
	2015–present	Flag of Isiolo County	Divided horizontally in two sections of green and gold, with a white triangle in the hoist containing the county's coat of arms.
	2018–present	Flag of Kajiado County	The upper portion of the flag is blue, and the lower portion is green. Separating them is a band of red and blue in a traditional pattern, fimbriated in white. In the center of the flag is the coat of arms of Kajiado County (minus its supporters and motto).
	2015–present	Flag of Kakamega County	Three horizontal stripes of green, white, and brown, separated by thin black strips, and featuring the county's coat of arms (minus its supporters, compartment, and motto) in its center.
	2016–present	Flag of Kericho County	A green field; through its center runs a horizontal yellow band fimbriated white. On top of the band is a yellow shield containing a tea bud, superimposed on two crossed spears, underneath which shield is a golden scroll bearing the inscription "COUNTY GOVERNMENT KERICHO".
	2019–present	Flag of Kiambu County	Three horizontal stripes of red, white, and green.Through the central white stripe run two thin blue strips. In the center of the flag is the shield of the Kiambu County coat of arms: a red circle containing a white hand holding a bulltail whisk, surrounded by a ring of twelve white beads.
	2014–present	Flag of Kilifi County	Three horizontal stripes of gold, green, and blue, separated by thin white stripes, charged with the coat of arms of Kilifi County (minus its supporters, patterned fabric border, and motto) in the center.
	2013–present	Flag of Kirinyaga County	Diagonal bands of green, white, and yellow (from upper hoist to lower fly). In the center is the county's coat of arms, featuring Mount Kenya and agricultural symbols.
	2015–present	Flag of Kisii County	Three horizontal stripes of blue, white, and green, with a roundel similar to both the public seal and coat of arms of Kisii County in the center.
	2013–present	Flag of Kisumu County	The flag is blue, with uneven horizontal stripes of black, white, and green on its upper and lower edges. In the center of the flag is the emblem of Kisumu County.
	2010–present	Flag of Kitui County	Three horizontal stripes of black, beige, and green, fimbriated white. In the hoist of the flag is a blue triangle, similarly fimbriated, in whose center is the county coat of arms on a white roundel.
	2016–present	Flag of Kwale County	Three horizontal stripes of black, white, and red, fimbriated blue. In the center of the flag is the coat of arms of Kwale County.
		Flag of Laikipia County	The coat of arms of Laikipia County superimposed on a white map of the county on a green field.
	2014–present	Flag of Lamu County	
	2016–present	Flag of Machakos County	Five even horizontal stripes of black, blue, yellow, red, and green, with the coat of arms of Machakos County on a white roundel.
	2021–present	Flag of Mandera County	A red field; in its hoist (left) side is a triangle in the striped pattern of the Kenyan national flag: black, red, and green, fimbriated white. In the fly of the flag is a large white outline of a star, surrounded by eight smaller white stars.
	2014–present	Flag of Marsabit County	Green, with a horizontal white stripe edged in blue through its center, superimposed on which stripe is the seal of Marsabit County (minus the text "THE COUNTY GOVERNMENT OF MARSABIT").
	2016–present	Flag of Meru County	The lower portion of the flag is green, with a river running through its center. The upper portion of the flag is orange, and features three mountain peaks, from which radiate nine rays of light.
	2017–present	Flag of Migori County	The flag is green, and in its center is a white ring with eight gold stars. Within the ring are two clasped hands.
	2013–present	Flag of Mombasa County	The field is light blue, with the coat of arms of Mombasa County on a white Canadian pale.
	2014–present	Flag of Murang'a County	The flag is divided into three horizontal stripes of black, gold, and green, separated by thin white stripes. In the center of the flag is the coat of arms of Murang'a County, with its inscription "Growing together" changed from black to white.
	2013–present	Flag of Nairobi County	The flag is dark green, and a yellow triangle edged in white stretches from the hoist to the fly end. Inside of the triangle is the shield of the coat of arms of Nairobi County, under which shield is a gold ribbon bearing the inscription "Ushauri kwa Uaminifu." In the upper fly (right) corner of the flag is a golden lion rampant.
	2016–present	Flag of Nakuru County	Three horizontal stripes of blue, brown, and green, fimbriated white. In the center of the flag is a white oval containing two flamingoes.
	2014–present	Flag of Nandi County	
	2016–present	Flag of Nyamira County	Eleven horizontal stripes of red and white, with a green canton in the hoist containing a yellow roundel with a banana tree and a dove.
	2014–present	Flag of Nyandarua County	The flag is green and contains the coat of arms of Nyandarua County in the center. In the corners are four semicircular regions featuring stripes of white, blue, and black, representing the county's diverse landscape and water resources.
	2020–present	Flag of Nyeri County	Three horizontal stripes of blue, green, and brown, fimbriated in white. In the center of the flag, on a white roundel with a green margin, is the coat of arms of Nyeri County with the words "COUNTY GOVERNMENT OF NYERI" above the arms and five blue stars below.
	2015–present	Flag of Samburu County	The flag is divided in two sections by a horizontal white stripe one seventh the flag's total height running horizontally through the center. The portion above the stripe is blue, while the portion below is red. In the center of the flag is the county's coat of arms with its oryx and lion supporters replaced with a Samburu warrior and lady in traditional attire.
	2013–present	Flag of Taita Taveta County	The flag is bisected diagonally by a thin white stripe, the upper portion orange and the lower green. In the center of the flag is the sun, upon which is a shield bearing a "flower of unity", and two elephants raising their trunks to form an "A" between two letter "T"s (Taita And Taveta).
	2015–present	Flag of Tana River County	The coat of arms of Tana River is charged upon a white gussetlike shape. The ground is red above the gusset and green below.
	2014–present	Flag of Trans-Nzoia County	
	2013–present	Flag of Turkana County	The flag is bisected horizontally into blue and brown, with the county emblem in the center in white. In the bottom-fly corner is a green band fimbriated white.
	2013–present	Flag of Uasin Gishu County	A horizontal tricolour of green, white, and gold, with the county's coat of arms in the center.
	2014–present	Flag of Vihiga County	Bright green with a gold chevron containing a brown pile, both fimbriated white.
	2014–present	Flag of Wajir County	The flag has a white Spanish fess, with brown above and green below, fimbriated gold, with a gold crescent in its center.
	2013–present	Flag of West Pokot County	A vertical triband of green, white, and green. In the center stripe is the county's coat of arms. The green stripes each contain a gold pile.

=== Liberia ===
Flag	Date	Use	Description
		Flag of Bomi County	
		Flag of Bong County	
		Flag of Gbarpolu County	
		Flag of Grand Bassa County	
		Flag of Grand Cape Mount County	
		Flag of Grand Gedeh County	
		Flag of Grand Kru County	
		Flag of Lofa County	
		Flag of Margibi County	
		Flag of Maryland County	
		Flag of Montserrado County	
		Flag of Nimba County	
		Flag of Rivercess County	
		Flag of River Gee County	
		Flag of Sinoe County	

=== Tanzania ===
There is only one official provincial flag.

Flag	Date	Use	Description
	2005 –present	Flag of Zanzibar	Horizontal tricolour of blue, black, and green with the national flag of Tanzania in the canton.

== Flags of African cities ==
Flags of cities with over 1 million inhabitants.

Flag of Accra, Ghana

Flag of Addis Ababa, Ethiopia

Flag of Alexandria, Egypt

Flag of Antananarivo, Madagascar

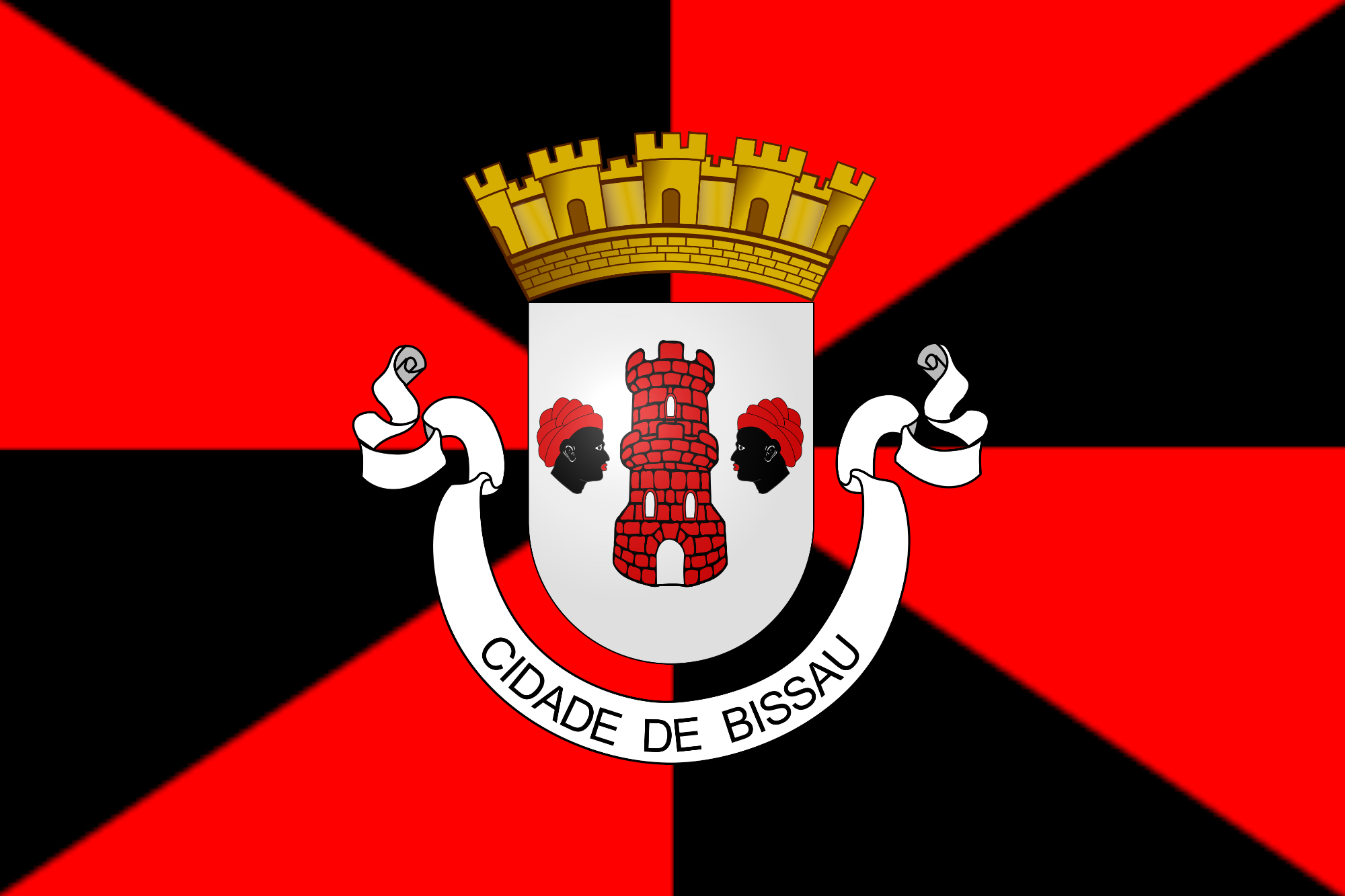
Flag of Bissau, Guinea-Bissau

Flag of Cairo, Egypt

Flag of Casablanca, Morocco

Flag of El Matareya, Egypt

Flag of Fes, Morocco

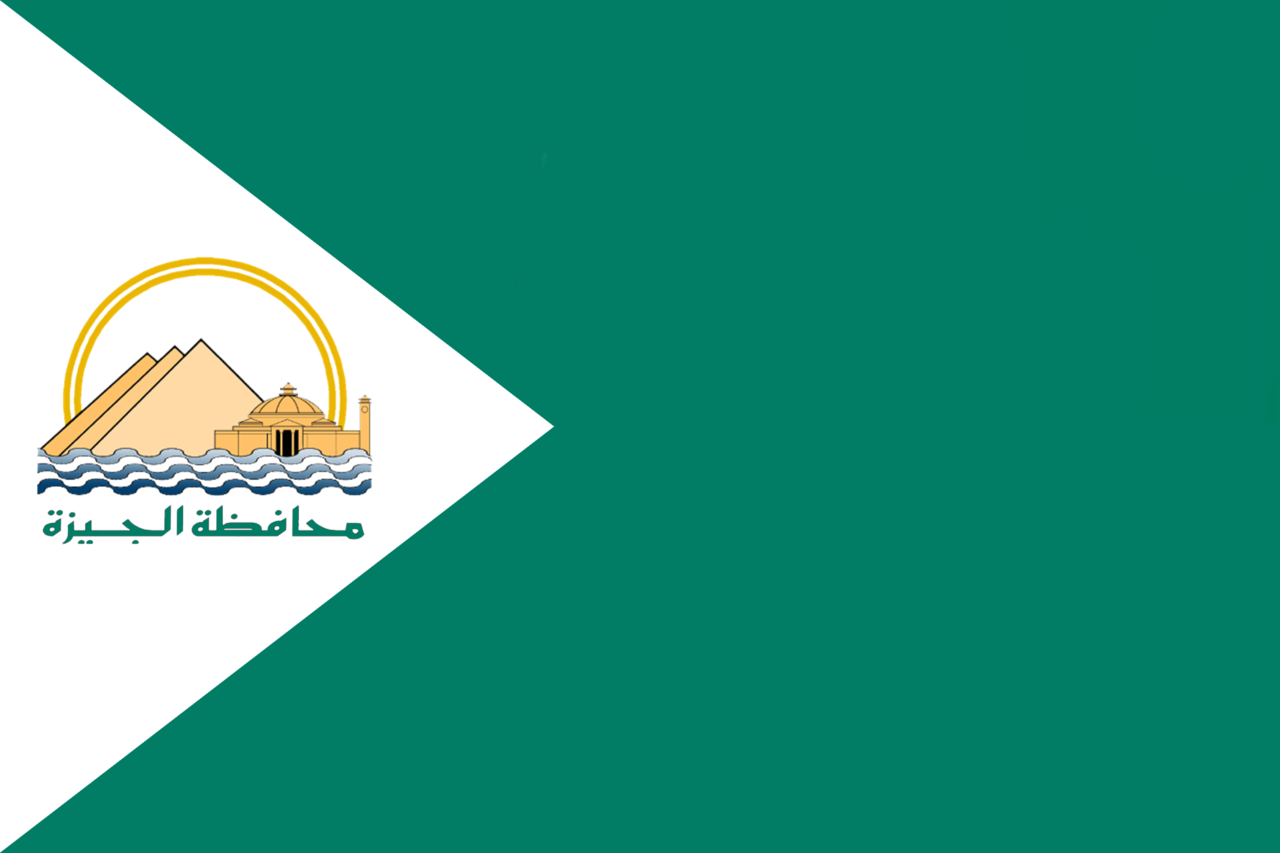
Flag of Giza, Egypt

Flag of Harare, Zimbabwe

Flag of Hargeisa, Somaliland

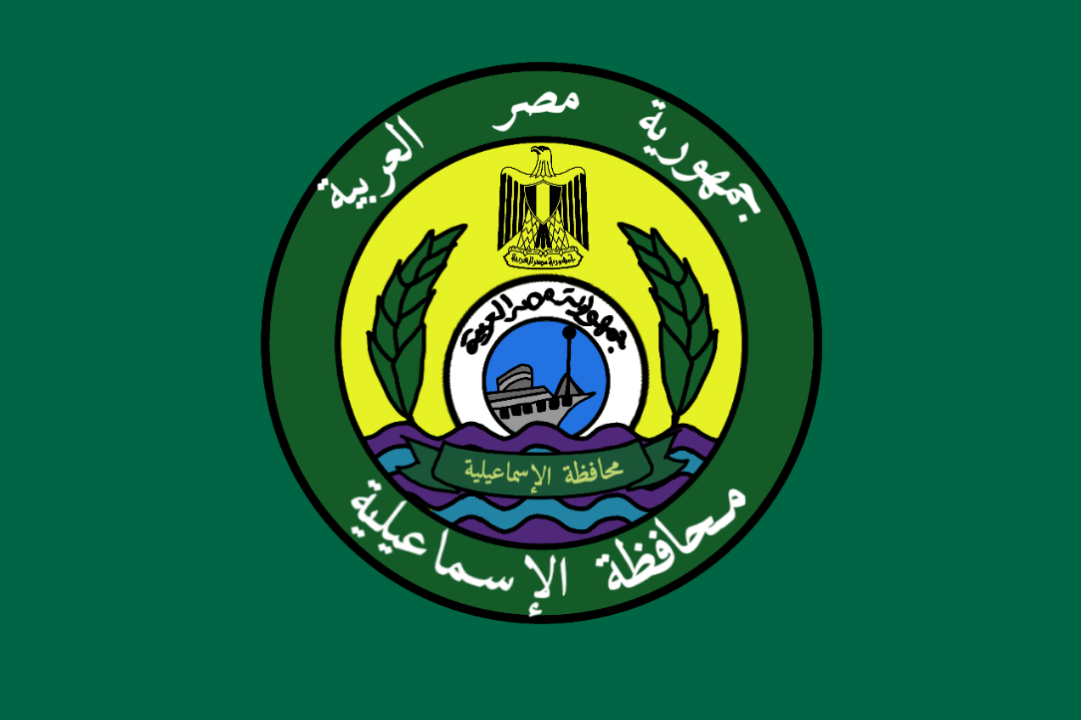
Flag of Ismailia, Egypt

Flag of Johannesburg, South Africa

Flag of Kano, Nigeria

Flag of Kinshasa, Democratic Republic of the Congo

Flag of Kumasi, Ghana

Flag of Lagos, Nigeria

Flag of Luanda, Angola
(1964–1975)

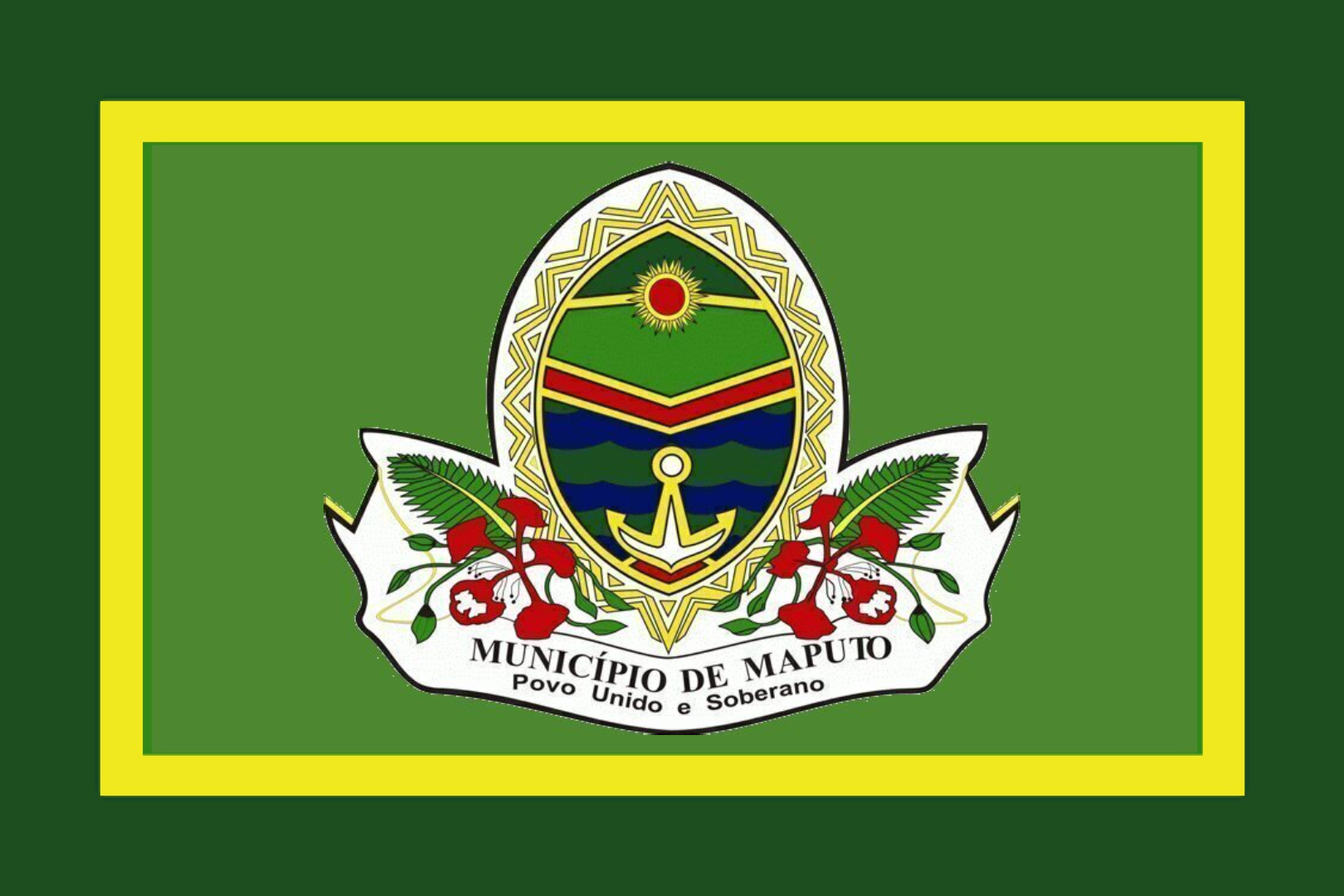
Flag of Maputo, Mozambique

Flag of Mogadishu, Somalia

Flag of Mombasa, Kenya

Flag of Nairobi, Kenya

== Ethnic flags ==
Flag	Date	Use	Description
		Afrikaner flag	
		Basters flag	
		Batwa flag	
		Bemba flag	
	1998–present	Berber flag	
		Bubi flag	
		Ewe flag	
		Kanuri flag	
		Lozi flag	
		Maasai flag	
	1997–present	Merina flag	
	1920–present	Pan-African flag	
		Tiv flag	
	Unknown–present	Yoruba flag	

== Historical flags ==
Flag	Date	Use	Description
	2012–2013	Flag of Azawad	
	1975–1990	Flag of the People's Republic of Benin	
	1967–1970	Flag of the Republic of Biafra	
	1962–1966	Flag of the Kingdom of Burundi	
	1966	Flag of the Republic of Burundi	
	1966–1967	Flag of the Republic of Burundi	
	1967–1982	Flag of the Republic of Burundi	
	1922–1961	Flag of British Cameroon	
	1957–1961	Flag of Cameroon	
	1961–1975	Flag of Cameroon	
	1876–1910	Flag of the Cape Colony	
	1975–1992	Flag of Cape Verde	
	1963–1975	Flag of the Comoros	
	1975–1978	Flag of the Comoros	
	1978–1992	Flag of the Comoros	
	1992–1996	Flag of the Comoros	
	1996–2001	Flag of the Comoros	
	1885–1960	Flag of the Congo Free State / the Belgian Congo	
	1960–1963	Flag of Congo-Léopoldville	
	1963–1966	Flag of Congo-Léopoldville / the Democratic Republic of the Congo	
	1966–1971	Flag of the Democratic Republic of the Congo	
	1997–2003	Flag of the Democratic Republic of the Congo	
	2003–2006	Flag of the Democratic Republic of the Congo	
	1970–1991	Flag of the People's Republic of the Congo	
	1949–1951	Flag of the Emirate of Cyrenaica	
	1922–1958	Flag of Egypt	
	1972–1984	Flag of Egypt	
	1968–1973	Flag of Equatorial Guinea	
	1973–1979	Flag of Equatorial Guinea	
	1952–1962	Flag of Eritrea	
	1993–1995	Flag of Eritrea	
	1897–1914	Flag of Ethiopia	
	1914–1936, 1941–1974	Flag of Ethiopia	
	1974–1975	Flag of Ethiopia	
	1975–1987	Flag of Ethiopia	
	1987–1991	Flag of Ethiopia	
	1991–1996	Flag of Ethiopia	
	1996–2009	Flag of Ethiopia	
	1958–1959	Flag of French Sudan	
	1959–1960	Flag of Gabon	
	1889–1965	Flag of The Gambia	
	1964–1966	Flag of Ghana	
	1877–1957	Flag of the Gold Coast	
	1960–1963	Flag of the State of Katanga	
	1895–1921	Flag of Kenya	
	1921–1963	Flag of Kenya	
	1886–1906	Flag of the Lagos Colony	
	1966–1987	Flag of Lesotho	
	1987–2006	Flag of Lesotho	
	1827–1847	Flag of the Colony of Liberia / the Commonwealth of Liberia	
	1969–1972	Flag of Libya	
	1972–1977	Flag of Libya	
	1977–2011	Flag of Libya	
	1885–1896	Flag of the Malagasy Protectorate	
	2010–2012	Flag of Malawi	
	1959–1961	Flag of Mali	
	1854–1857	Flag of the Republic of Maryland	
	1959–2017	Flag of Mauritania	
	1869–1906	Flag of Mauritius	
	1906–1923	Flag of Mauritius	
	1923–1968	Flag of Mauritius	
	1974–1975	Flag of Mozambique	
	1975–1983	Flag of Mozambique	
	1983	Flag of Mozambique	
	1839–1843	Flag of the Natalia Republic	
	1884–1888	Flag of the Nieuwe Republiek	
	1900–1914	Flag of the Northern Nigeria Protectorate	
	1900–1914	Flag of the Southern Nigeria Protectorate	
	1914–1953	Flag of Nigeria	
	1953–1960	Flag of Nigeria	
	1914–1919	Flag of Nyasaland	
	1919–1925	Flag of Nyasaland	
	1925–1964	Flag of Nyasaland	
	1857–1902	Flag of the Orange Free State	
	1904–1910	Flag of the Orange River Colony	
	1939–1964	Flag of Northern Rhodesia	
	1924–1964	Flag of Southern Rhodesia	
	1964–1968	Flag of Southern Rhodesia / Rhodesia	
	1968–1979	Flag of Rhodesia	
	1979	Flag of Zimbabwe Rhodesia	
	1921–1926	Flag of the Republic of the Rif	
	1961	Flag of Rwanda	
	1961–2001	Flag of Rwanda	
	1874–1984	Flag of Saint Helena	
	1958–1959	Flag of Senegal	
	1903–1961	Flag of the Seychelles	
	1961–1976	Flag of the Seychelles	
	1976–1977	Flag of the Seychelles	
	1977–1996	Flag of the Seychelles	
	1889–1916	Flag of Sierra Leone	
	1916–1961	Flag of Sierra Leone	
	1903–1950	Flag of British Somaliland	
	1950–1953	Flag of British Somaliland	
	1953–1960	Flag of British Somaliland	
		Flag of the Spanish Sahara	
	1960	Flag of the State of Somaliland	
	1991–1996	Flag of the Republic of Somaliland	
	1857–1874, 1875–1877, 1881–1902	Flag of the South African Republic	
	1874–1875	Flag of the South African Republic	
	1910–1912	Flag of the Union of South Africa	
	1912–1928	Flag of the Union of South Africa	
	1928–1982	Flag of the Union of South Africa / the Republic of South Africa	
	1982–1994	Flag of the Republic of South Africa	
	1960–1962	Flag of South Kasai	
	2011–2023	Flag of South Sudan	
	1883	Flag of Stellaland	
	1883–1885	Flag of Stellaland	
	1955	Flag of Sudan	
	1956–1970	Flag of Sudan	
	1890–1894	Flag of Swaziland	
	1894–1902	Flag of Swaziland	
	1968–2011	Flag of Swaziland	
	1923–1961	Flag of Tanganyika Territory	
	1961–1964	Flag of Tanganyika	
	1957–1958	Flag of Togo	
	1958–1960	Flag of Togo	
	1914–1962	Flag of Uganda	
	1962	Flag of Uganda	
	1959–1984	Flag of Upper Volta	
	1971–1997	Flag of Zaire	
	1964–1996	Flag of Zambia	
	1963–1964	Flag of the Sultanate of Zanzibar	
	1964	Flag of the People's Republic of Zanzibar	
	1964	Flag of the People's Republic of Zanzibar	

=== Supranational and international flags ===
Flag	Date	Use	Description
	1961–1985	Flag of the African and Malagasy Union	
	2010–2011	Flag of the African Union	
	1967–1977	Flag of the East African Community	
	2003–2008	Flag of the East African Community	
	1975–2013	Flag of the Organisation of African, Caribbean and Pacific States	
	1970–2002, 2004–2010	Flag of the Organisation of African Unity / the African Union	
	1980–1992	Flag of the Southern African Development Coordination Conference	
	1958–1961	Flag of the Union of African States	
	1961–1963	Flag of the Union of African States	

== See also ==
- Armorial of Africa
- Flag of the African Union

Lists of flags of African countries

- List of Algerian flags
- List of Angolan flags
- List of Burundian flags
- List of Cameroonian flags
- List of Comorian flags
- List of flags of the Democratic Republic of the Congo
- List of Djibouti flags
- List of Egyptian flags
- List of flags of Equatorial Guinea
- List of Eritrean flags
- List of Ethiopian flags
- List of Gabonese flags
- List of Gambian flags
- List of Ghana flags
- List of flags of Kenya
- List of Libyan flags
- List of Malian flags
- List of Mauritanian flags
- List of Mauritian flags
- List of Moroccan flags
- List of Namibian flags
- List of Nigerian flags
- List of Rwandan flags
- List of Sierra Leone flags
- List of Somali flags
- List of South African flags
- List of South Sudanese flags
- List of Sudanese flags
- List of Tanzanian flags
- List of Togolese flags
- List of Tunisian flags
- List of Ugandan flags
- List of Zimbabwean flags
- List of Rhodesian flags

Other pages about African flags

- Pan-African colours
- Pan-African flag
