= List of Seychellois flags =

This is a list of flags used in Seychelles.

== National flag ==
Flag	Date	Use	Description
	1996–present	Flag of Seychelles	Five oblique bands of blue, yellow, red, white, and green radiating from the bottom of the hoist side.

== Presidential flags ==
Flag	Date	Use	Description
	1976–1977	Presidential flag of Seychelles	A white saltire dividing the flag into triangles of red (top and bottom) and blue (hoist and fly), defaced with the national coat of arms.
	1977–1996	Presidential flag of Seychelles	A bicoloured field of red and green with a wavy white stripe between, defaced with a white circle containing the national coat of arms.
	1996–present	Presidential flag of Seychelles	Five oblique bands of blue, yellow, red, white, and green radiating from the bottom of the hoist side, with the national coat of arms on the red band in the upper fly.

== Historical flags ==
Flag	Date	Use	Description
	1502–1521	Flag of Portugal	White with the coat of arms of the Kingdom in the middle.
	1521–1578	Flag of Portugal	White with the coat of arms of the Kingdom in the middle.
	1578–1609	Flag of Portugal	White with the coat of arms of the Kingdom in the middle.
	1609–1649	Flag of the Kingdom of England	A white field with centred red cross.
	1649–1651	Flag of the Commonwealth of England	St George's Cross and an Irish Harp juxtaposed.
	1651–1658	Flag of the Commonwealth of England	St George's Cross and St Andrew's cross quartered.
	1658–1660	Flag of the Protectorate	The 1606 Union Jack defaced with an Irish Harp.
	1660–1690	Flag of the Kingdom of England	A white field with centred red cross.
	1690–1742	The Jolly Roger	A black field with a white skull and crossbones.
	1742–1790	Flag of French Mauritius	A white banner with several fleurs de lis with the royal coat of arms in the center.
	1790–1794	Flag of French Mauritius	A vertical tricolour of red, white, and blue.
	1794–1810	Flag of French Mauritius	A vertical tricolour of blue, white, and red.
	1810–1869	Flag of British Mauritius	The Union Flag of the United Kingdom.
	1869–1903	Flag of British Mauritius	A British Blue Ensign with the 1869 arms of Mauritius on a white disc in the fly.
	1903–1961	Flag of the governor of the Crown Colony of the Seychelles	A Union Jack defaced with the Seychellois coat of arms.
	1903–1961	Flag of the Crown Colony of the Seychelles	A British Blue Ensign with the Seychellois coat of arms in the fly.
	1961–1976	Flag of the governor of the Crown Colony of the Seychelles	A Union Jack defaced with the Seychellois coat of arms.
	1961–1976	Flag of the Crown Colony of the Seychelles	A British Blue Ensign with the Seychellois coat of arms in the fly.
	1976–1977	Flag of Seychelles	A white saltire dividing the flag into triangles of red (top and bottom) and blue (hoist and fly).
	1977–1996	Flag of Seychelles	A bicoloured field of red and green with a wavy white stripe between.

== Political flags ==
Flag former	Date	Use	Description
	1960–2001	Flag of the Seychelles Democratic Party	

== See also ==
- Flag of Seychelles
- Coat of arms of Seychelles
