= List of Comorian flags =

Flags associated with the Comoros

The following is a list of flags and banners associated with the Comoros.

== National Flag ==
Flag	Date	Use	Description
	2001–present	Flag of the Comoros	Four horizontal stripes of yellow, white, red, and blue (from top to bottom); with a green pile based on the hoist side charged with a white crescent and four five-pointed stars in a line between the points of the crescent.
	2001–present	Flag of the Comoros (vertical)	When displayed vertically, the green triangle at the hoist is at the top, with the blue stripe to the left and the yellow stripe to the right.

== Island Flags ==
Flag	Date	Use	Description
	2012–present	Flag of Anjouan	A red field charged with a centered white crescent moon and four white stars.
	2002–present	Flag of Grande Comore	A navy blue field charged with a crescent moon and four white stars in hoist side.
	2003–present	Flag of Mohéli	A large five-pointed red star centered on a yellow field.

== Historical Flags ==
Flag	Date	Use	Description
	1500–1698	Flag of the Sultanate of Ndzuwani	A red field.
	1830–1833	Flag of the Sultanate of Ndzuwani	A red field.
	1576–1578	Flag of the Kingdom of Portugal	A white field with the coat of arms in the center.
	1578–1640	Flag of the Kingdom of Portugal	A white field with the coat of arms in the center.
	1616–1640	Flag of the Kingdom of Portugal (putative)	A white field with the coat of arms in the center.
	1640–1650	Flag of the Kingdom of Portugal	A white field with the coat of arms in the center.
	1698–1830	Flag of the Omani Empire	A white field with red Arabic script below a red sword pointed to the right.
	1830–1868	Flag of the Mwali Sultanate	A simple red field.
	1833–1850	Flag of the Sultanate of Ndzuwani	A red field with a white border.
	1841–1940	Flag of the July Monarchy	A vertical tricolour of blue, white, and red (proportions 3:2).
	1841–1940	Flag of the French Second Republic	A vertical tricolour of blue, white, and red (proportions 3:2).
	1841–1940	Flag of the Second French Empire	A vertical tricolour of blue, white, and red (proportions 3:2).
	1841–1940	Flag of the French Third Republic	A vertical tricolour of blue, white, and red (proportions 3:2).
	1944–1975	Flag of the Provisional Government of the French Republic	A vertical tricolour of blue, white, and red (proportions 3:2).
	1944–1975	Flag of the French Fourth Republic	A vertical tricolour of blue, white, and red (proportions 3:2).
	1944–1975	Flag of the French Fifth Republic	A vertical tricolour of blue, white, and red (proportions 3:2).
	1841–1848	Royal Standard of Louis-Philippe I	A vertical tricolour of blue, white, and red centered with the royal arms of Louis-Philippe I.
	1842–1867	Flag of Queen Djoumbé Fatima (also used as a separatist flag)	A red field with a vertical yellow stripe on the hoist side.
	1997–1998	Flag of Queen Djoumbé Fatima (also used as a separatist flag)	A red field with a vertical yellow stripe on the hoist side.
	1850	Flag of the Sultanate of Ndzuwani	A vertical triband of red (hoist-side and fly-side) and white centered with an Arabic script written in black.
	1850–1893	Flag of the Sultanate of Ndzuwani (also used as a separatist flag and later as an official flag)	A red field centered with a white crescent moon and a hand.
	1997–2012	Flag of the Sultanate of Ndzuwani (also used as a separatist flag and later as an official flag)	A red field centered with a white crescent moon and a hand.
	1868–1871	Flag of the Mwali Sultanate	Eight horizontal stripes alternating red and white.
	1870	Imperial standard of Napoléon III	A vertical tricolour of blue, white, and red, with the red stripe larger than the other two stripes, several golden bees and centered with the royal arms of Napoléon III.
	1871–1886	Flag of the Mwali Sultanate	A horizontal bicolour of white and red, similar to the flag of Poland.
	1886–1891	Flag of the Mwali Sultanate	A red field centered with an Arabic script written in white.
	1891–1904	Flag of the Mwali Sultanate	Eight horizontal stripes alternating red and white and a vertical green stripe on the hoist side with a crescent moon and five-pointed star in the canton.
	1940–1942	Flag of Vichy France	A vertical tricolour of blue, white, and red with an axe and seven golden stars.
	1942–1943	Flag of the United Kingdom	A superimposition of the flags of England and Scotland with the Saint Patrick's Saltire (representing Ireland).
	1943–1944	Flag of Free France	A vertical tricolour of blue, white, and red with the Lorraine cross.
	1963–1975	First flag of the Comoros	A green field with a white crescent at upper hoist facing the fly, four stars in a diagonal.
	1975–1978	Second flag of the Comoros	A red field with a horizontal green stripe at the bottom and a white crescent moon and four white five-pointed stars in the canton.
	1978–1992	Third flag of the Comoros	A green field charged with a centered white crescent moon and four white stars.
	1992–1996	Fourth flag of the Comoros	A green field charged with a centered white crescent moon and four white stars.
	1996–2001	Fifth flag of the Comoros	A green field charged with a centered white crescent moon and four white stars and a white inscription to the lower hoist and another to the upper fly. The inscriptions are written in Arabic calligraphy with the former reading "Muhammed" and the latter reading "Allah".
	2002–2003	Flag of Mohéli	A yellow field with a narrow vertical black stripe on the hoist side and a crescent moon and five-pointed star towards the fly.

== See also ==
- Flag of the Comoros
- National seal of the Comoros
