= List of Gambian flags =

This is a gallery of flags used in the Republic of The Gambia.

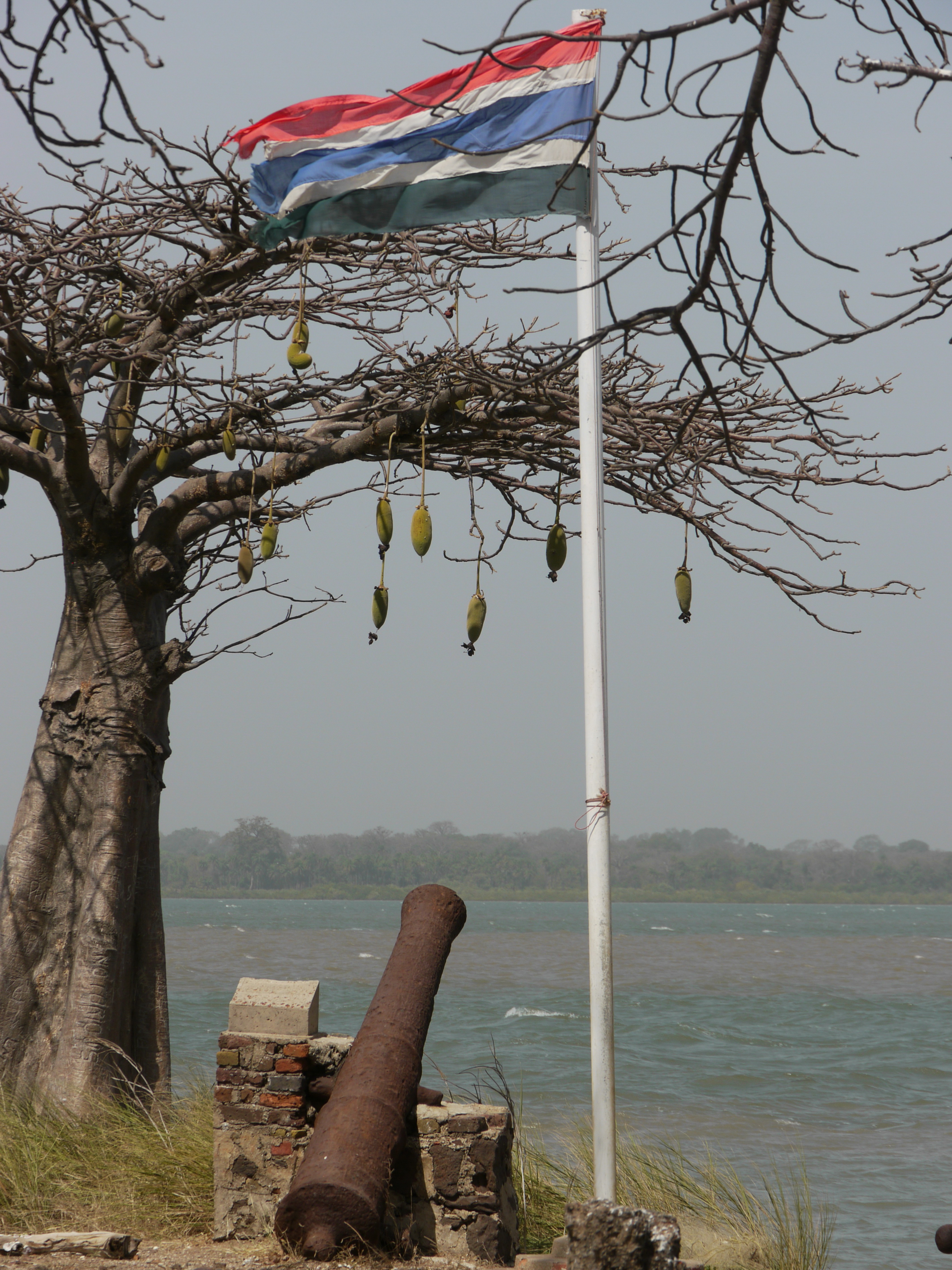
Gambian national flag flying on Kunta Kinteh Island

== National flag ==
Flag	Date	Use	Description
	1965–present	National flag and ensign	The national flag of The Gambia consists of horizontal bands of red, blue, and green, separated by thin white stripes.

== Governmental flags ==
Flag	Date	Use	Description
		Standard of the president of The Gambia	A blue flag with the coat of arms of The Gambia in the center.
		Standard of Gambian ambassadors	The national flag with the national coat of arms in the center.

== Military flags and ensigns ==
Flag	Date	Use	Description
		Flag of the Gambia National Army	Three vertical stripes of green, red, and green. In the center is two rifles crossed over a palm tree, surrounded by wreaths. Underneath this emblem is a golden scroll reading GAMBIA ARMY.
		Flag of the Gambia Navy	A white flag with the national flag of The Gambia in the canton and an ensnared blue anchor in the fly.

== Flags of local government areas ==
Flag of Banjul

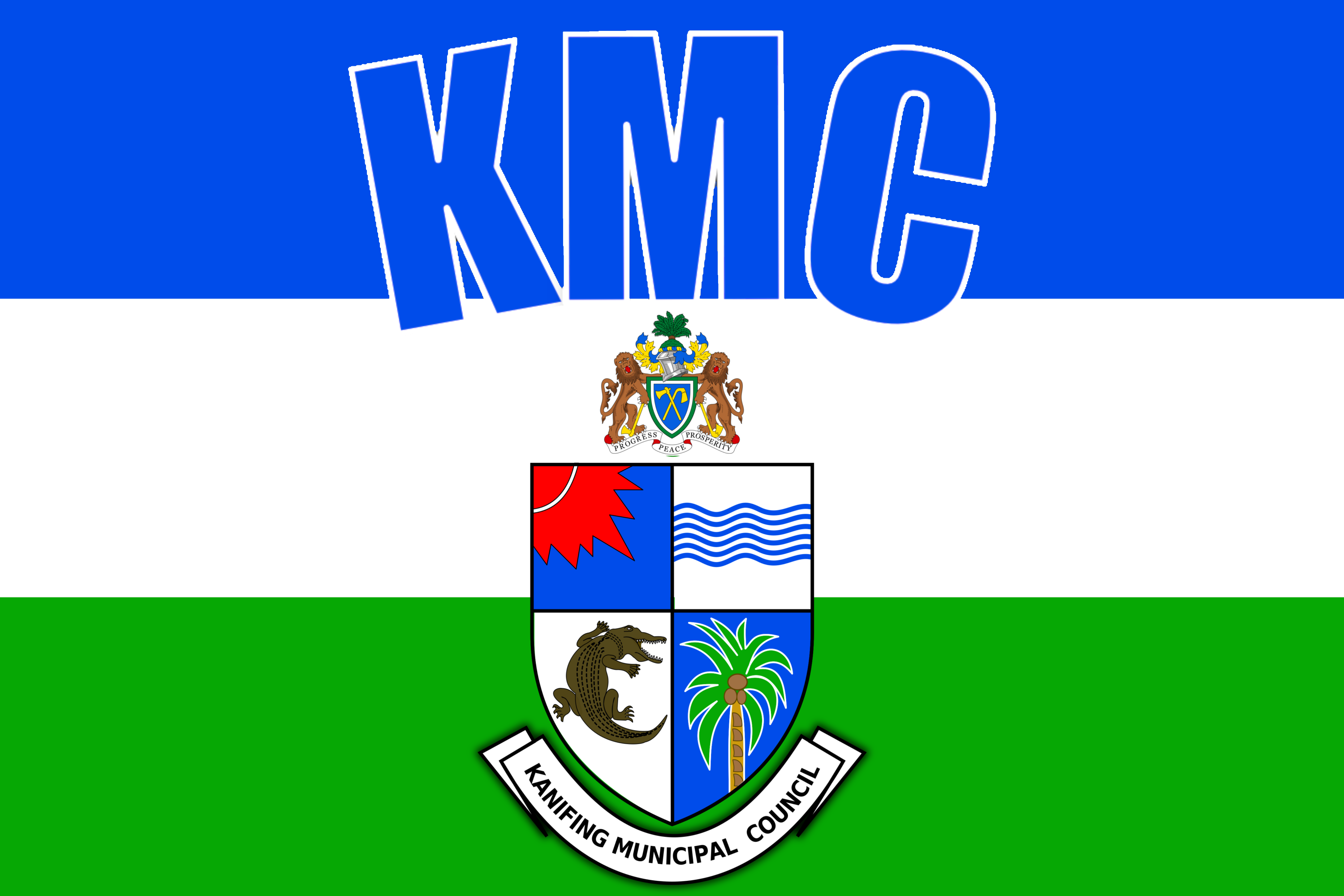
Flag of Kanifing

== Historical flags ==
Chronology
Flag	Date	Use	Description
	1324–1506	Possible flag of the Mali Empire	Attested flag used by Mansa Musa, possible state flag of the Mali Empire. Yellow with a red border.
	1450–1485	Flag used in the Portuguese colonization in The Gambia	
	1485–1495	Flag used in the Portuguese colonization in The Gambia	
	1495–1521	Flag used in the Portuguese colonization in The Gambia	
	1521–1578	Flag used in the Portuguese colonization in The Gambia	
	1578–1588	Flag used in the Portuguese colonization in The Gambia	
	1588–1651; 1661–1681	Flag used in the English colonization in The Gambia	
	1651–1659; 1660–1661	Merchant ensign used in the Couronian colonization in The Gambia	
	1659–1660	The Prince's Flag used in the Dutch colonization in The Gambia	
	1659–1660	The States Flag used in the Dutch colonization in The Gambia	
	1684–1695	Flag used by the Royal African Company in The Gambia	
	1695–1699; 1779–1783	Flag used in the French colonization in The Gambia	
	1713–1779; 1783–1801	The Union Jack used in the British colonization in The Gambia	
	1801–1870	The Union Jack used in the British colonization in The Gambia	
	1870–1889	Flag of British West Africa	
	1870–1889	Flag of the governor-in-chief of British West Africa	
	1889–1965	Flag of the Gambia Colony and Protectorate	
	1901–1965	Flag of the governor of The Gambia	
	1965–1970	Flag of the governor-general of The Gambia	

== See also ==
- Flag of The Gambia
- Flags of Africa
- Lists of flags
