= Crown Colony of the Seychelles =

British colony in Africa from 1903 to 1976

- 1903–1976
- Flag Coat of arms

- Status: British colony
- Capital: Victoria
- Monarch
  - 1903-1910: Edward VII
  - 1910-1936: George V
  - 1936: Edward VIII
  - 1936–1952: George VI
  - 1952–1976: Elizabeth II
- History
  - Separation from the Crown Colony of Mauritius: 31 August 1903
  - Independence: 29 June 1976
- Currency: Seychellois rupee (from 1914)
- ISO 3166 code: SC
Preceded by	Succeeded by
British Mauritius	Republic of Seychelles

The Crown Colony of the Seychelles (also known as British Seychelles or simply Seychelles) was a British crown colony located on the African Islands collectively known as the Seychelles. It was governed by the British from 1903 until its independence in 1976. Upon its independence, James Mancham of the Seychelles Democratic Party was elected its first president.

== History ==
Seychellois officials wanted Seychelles to organised as a separate autonomous colony within the British Empire, and the authorities in the mother colony, Mauritius, supported them. Sir Arthur Gordon, the Mauritian governor, sent a petition on their behalf to London. Concessions were made, but Seychelles did not become a Crown Colony in its own right until 1903 when its first Governor, Sir Ernest Bickham Sweet-Escott took office. Befitting its new status, the colony acquired a botanical garden and a clock tower in the heart of Victoria. The French language and culture remained dominant, however.

The British, like the French before them, saw Seychelles as a useful place to exile troublesome political prisoners. Over the years, Seychelles became a home to prisoners from Zanzibar, Egypt, Cyprus and Palestine, to name but a few. The first in the line of exiles was Sultan Abdullah, a sultan in Perak including Lela Pandak Lam, the ex-chief of Pasir Salak in Perak who arrived in 1875 after their implication in the murder of the British Resident of Perak, JW Birch. Like many of the exiles who followed, they settled well into Seychelles life and became genuinely fond of the islands. Sultan Abdullah's son took home with him one of the popular local French tunes by the islanders, "La Rosalie" and incorporated it into the national anthem of his country. With new words, it later became Negaraku, the national anthem of Malaysia.

Perhaps the most famous of the political prisoners was Archbishop Makarios from Cyprus, who arrived in 1956. He likewise fell in love with his prison. "When our ship leaves harbour", he wrote, "we shall take with us many good and kindly memories of the Seychelles...may God bless them all."

World War I caused great hardship in the islands. Ships could not bring in essential goods, nor take away exports. Wages fell; prices soared by 150 per cent. Many turned to crime and the prisons were bursting. Joining the Seychelles Labour Contingent, formed at the request of General Smuts, seemed to offer an escape. It was no easy option, however. The force, 800 strong, was sent to East Africa. After just five months, so many had died from dysentery, malaria and beriberi that the corps was sent home. In all, 335 men died.

By the end of World War I, the population of Seychelles was 24,000 and they were feeling neglected by Great Britain. There was agitation from the newly formed Planters Association for greater representation in the governance of Seychelles affairs. After 1929, a more liberal flow of funds was ensured by the Colonial Development Act, but it was a time of economic depression; the price of copra was falling and so were wages. Workers petitioned the government about their poor working conditions and the burden of tax they had to bear. Governor Sir Arthur Grimble instigated some reforms, exempting lower income groups from taxation. He was keen to create model housing and distribute smallholdings for the landless. Many of his reforms were not approved until World War II had broken out, and everything was put on hold.

The Planters Association lobbied for the white landowners, but until 1937 those who worked for them had no voice. The League of Coloured Peoples was formed to demand a minimum wage, a wage tribunal and free health care for all. During World War II, a seaplane depot was established on St Anne to monitor regional shipping. A garrison was stationed in the islands and a battery built at Pointe Conan to protect the harbour. Some 2,000 Seychellois men served in the Pioneer Companies in Egypt, Palestine and Italy.

At home, Seychelles had turmoil of its own. The first political party, the Taxpayers Association, was formed in 1939. A British governor described it as "the embodiment of every reactionary force in Seychelles", and it was entirely concerned with protecting the interests of the plantocracy. After the war, they also benefited by being granted the vote, which was limited to literate property owners; just 2,000 in a population of 36,000. At the first elections, in 1948, most of those elected to the Legislative Council were predictably members of the Planters and Taxpayers Association.

In 1958, the French bought back the Glorioso islands from the Seychelles.
