= List of flags of the Democratic Republic of the Congo =

This is a list of flags used by the Democratic Republic of the Congo and its antecedents.

== National ==
Flag	Date	Use	Description
	2006–present	Flag of the Democratic Republic of the Congo	Sky blue flag, adorned with a yellow star in the upper hoist and cut diagonally by a red stripe with yellow fimbriation.

== Standards ==
Flag	Date	Use	Description
	2006–present	Flag of the president of the Democratic Republic of the Congo	National flag with the addition of the inscription "Le President"
	1971–1997	Presidential standard of Zaire	
	1936–1960	Standard of the governor-general of the Belgian Congo	Flag of the Belgian Congo superimposed on the upper hoist of the flag of Belgium

== Sub-national ==
Flag	Date	Use	Description
	1960–1967	Flag of Léopoldville	
	1967–2011	Flag of Kinshasa	
	2011–present	Flag of Kinshasa	

== Political flags ==
Flag	Date	Party	Description
	2009–present	Future of Congo	

== Rebel groups ==
Flag	Date	Use	Description
	1967–1996	Flag of the Party of the People's Revolution	
	2006–present	Flag of the National Congress for the Defence of the People	The design of this flag resembles the flag of Zaire.
	1996–present	Flag of the Allied Democratic Forces	
	2014–present	Flag of Nduma Defense of Congo-Renovated	
	2000–present	Flag of the Democratic Forces for the Liberation of Rwanda	
	2010s–present	Separatist flag of Kivu	

== Ethnic groups flags ==
Flag	Date	Use	Description
	?–present	Flag of Batwa (originally it was only represented by Batwa in Rwanda)	
	?–present	Flag of the Bakongo in DMK	

== Historical ==
=== National ===
Flag	Date	Associated state	Design	Notes
	1876–1879	International African Association	Blue background emblazoned with a central yellow five-pointed star	The blue background symbolises the Congo River and the yellow star (which is still used) symbolises both unity, and a bright future. It was the only flag used during the entire period of colonial Belgian administration.
	1879–1885	International Association of the Congo	Blue background emblazoned with a central yellow five-pointed star	The blue background symbolises the Congo River and the yellow star (which is still used) symbolises both unity, and a bright future. It was the only flag used during the entire period of colonial Belgian administration.
	1885–1908	Congo Free State	Blue background emblazoned with a central yellow five-pointed star	The blue background symbolises the Congo River and the yellow star (which is still used) symbolises both unity, and a bright future. It was the only flag used during the entire period of colonial Belgian administration.
	1908–1960	Belgian Congo	Blue background emblazoned with a central yellow five-pointed star	The blue background symbolises the Congo River and the yellow star (which is still used) symbolises both unity, and a bright future. It was the only flag used during the entire period of colonial Belgian administration.
	1960–1963	First Congolese Republic	An additional six yellow five-pointed stars are added to the hoist	The added stars represent the six state provinces existing at the time of independence from Belgium.
	1963–1964	First Congolese Republic	A yellow five-pointed star sitting alongside a red and gold bend sinister on a blue background	The red bend represents the blood of martyrs, and the gold frame represents the riches of the land.
	1964–1966	Democratic Republic of the Congo	A yellow five-pointed star sitting alongside a red and gold bend sinister on a blue background	The red bend represents the blood of martyrs, and the gold frame represents the riches of the land.
	1966–1971	Democratic Republic of the Congo	The red and gold bend sinister was changed to a reduced bend sinister	
	1971–1997	Republic of Zaire	Light green emblazoned with a yellow circle containing an arm holding a red torch	Filled with Pan-African colours, the flag has a central emblem which is that of the Popular Movement. The torch symbolises the spirit of revolution and the lives of dead revolutionaries.
	1997–2006	Democratic Republic of the Congo		

=== Other ===
Flag	Date	Use	Description
	1895–1908	Flag of the Batetela Rebels	
	1960–1962	Flag of South Kasai	
	1960–1963	Flag of the State of Katanga	
	1971–1997	Flag of the Armed Forces of Zaire	Similar to the Presidential Standard of Zaire

== Flag proposal ==
Flag	Date	Use	Description
	May 1960	Anti-Lumumbist proposal for the flag of Congo-Léopoldville	
