= List of Sierra Leone flags =

The following is a list of flags used in Sierra Leone.

== National flag ==
Flag	Date	Use	Description
	1961–present	Flag of Sierra Leone	A horizontal tricolour of light green, white, and light blue.

== Government flag ==
Flag	Date	Use	Description
	1971–present	Presidential flag of Sierra Leone	A green field with a white square in the center containing the national coat of arms.

== Military flags ==
Flag	Date	Use	Description
	1961–1971	White Ensign of Sierra Leone	A white field defaced with the Cross of Saint George and the national flag in canton.
	1961–present	Naval ensign of Sierra Leone	A white field with the national flag in canton.

== Historical flags ==
=== Portuguese rule ===
Flag	Date	Use	Description
	1462–1485	Flag of the Kingdom of Portugal	Five blue escutcheons each charged with an undetermined number of bezants on a white field. Border: red with yellow castles and a green cross of the Order of Aviz.
	1485–1495	Flag of the Kingdom of Portugal	Five blue escutcheons each charged with five bezants on a white field. Border: red with seven yellow castles.
	1495–1521	Flag of the Kingdom of Portugal	A white field with the coat of arms in the center.
	1521–1578	Flag of the Kingdom of Portugal	A white field with the coat of arms in the center.
	1578–1640	Flag of the Kingdom of Portugal	A white field with the coat of arms in the center.
	1616–1640	Flag of the Kingdom of Portugal (putative flag)	A white field with the coat of arms in the center.
	1640–1667	Flag of the Kingdom of Portugal	A white field with the coat of arms in the center.
	1667–1706	Flag of the Kingdom of Portugal	A white field with the coat of arms in the center.
	1706–1750	Flag of the Kingdom of Portugal	A white field with the coat of arms in the center.
	1750–1787	Flag of the Kingdom of Portugal	A white field with the coat of arms in the center.

=== British rule ===
Flag	Date	Use	Description
	1787–1801	Flag of the Kingdom of Great Britain	A superimposition of the flags of England and Scotland.
	1801–1971	Flag of the United Kingdom	A superimposition of the flags of England and Scotland with the Saint Patrick's Saltire (representing Ireland).
	1870–1888	Flag of British West Africa	A British Blue Ensign defaced with the arms of the territory. Identical to the flags of the Gold Coast, The Gambia and Lagos Colony except for the initials on the emblem.
	1870–1888	Flag of the governor of British West Africa	The Union Jack defaced in the centre with the arms of the territory surrounded by a laurel wreath.
	1889–1916	Flag of the Sierra Leone Colony and Protectorate	A British Blue Ensign defaced with the arms of the territory. Identical to the flags of the Gold Coast, The Gambia and Lagos Colony except for the initials on the emblem.
	1889–1916	Flag of the governor of Sierra Leone	The Union Jack defaced in the centre with the arms of the territory surrounded by a laurel wreath.
	1916–1961	Flag of the Sierra Leone Colony and Protectorate	A British Blue Ensign defaced with the arms of the crown colony. This consisted of the old Union Jack at the chief (the design used before the formation of the United Kingdom of Great Britain and Ireland in 1801), an oil palm tree at the sinister base, and an African person watching a ship arrive in the harbour.
	1916–1961	Flag of the governor of Sierra Leone	The Union Jack defaced in the centre with the arms of the territory surrounded by a laurel wreath.
	1961–1971	Queen Elizabeth II's personal flag for Sierra Leone	One of Queen Elizabeth II's personal flags. It features the coat of arms of Sierra Leone in banner form. This flag was used when she was Queen of Sierra Leone until it was made redundant by the introduction of a republican form of government in 1971.
	1961–1971	Standard of the governor-general of Sierra Leone	Flag of the governor-general of Sierra Leone. This flag was made redundant by the introduction of a republican form of government in 1971.

=== During the Civil War ===
Flag	Date	Use	Description
	1991–2002	Flag of Bangladesh	A red disc on top of a green field, offset slightly toward the hoist.
	1991–2002	Flag of the United Nations	A white UN emblem (a polar azimuthal equidistant projection world map surrounded by two olive branches) on a blue background.

== See also ==
- Flag of Sierra Leone
- Coat of arms of Sierra Leone
