= List of Namibian flags =

The following is a list of Namibian flags.

== National flag ==
Flag	Date	Use	Description
	1990–present	National flag and ensign	A red band edged in white cuts diagonally through the flag from the lower hoist to the upper fly, dividing it into two triangular sections: the upper triangle is blue, charged with a gold sun with twelve triangular rays, the lower triangle is green.

== Governmental flag ==
Flag	Date	Use	Description
	1990–present	Presidential standard	A golden isoceles triangle based at the hoist divides the flag, the triangles formed above and below are blue and green, respectively. The national coat of arms sits inside the golden triangle.

== Military flags ==
Flag	Date	Use	Description
	1990–present	Defence Force flag	Red, white, and blue triangles with the force arms inside the white triangle.
	1990–present	Police flag	A blue standard with a red band cutting diagonally from the lower hoist to the upper fly, the national flag in the canton and the police force symbol in the lower fly.
	1990–present	Namibian Army flag	
	2005–present	Namibian Air Force flag	
	2004–present	Namibian Navy ensign	
	1990–present	Naval jack	A white field with the national flag in the canton.

== Flags of bantustans in South West Africa ==
Some of the bantustans established by South Africa during its period of administering South West Africa had adopted their own distinctive flags whilst others used the flag of South Africa.

Flag	Date	Use	Description
	1980–1989	Flag of Damaraland	
	1972–1989	Flag of East Caprivi	
	1964–1989	Flag of Kaokoland	
	1970–1989	Flag of Kavangoland	
	1968–1989	Flag of Ovamboland	
	1980–1989	Flag of Tswanaland	

== Political flags ==
Flag	Date	Use	Description
	2007–present	Rally for Democracy and Progress	
Link to file	1985–present	United Democratic Party	
	1999–present	Congress of Democrats	
	1960–present	SWAPO	
	1959–present	South West Africa National Union	

== Historical flags ==
=== German Empire (1884–1915) ===
Flag	Date	Use	Description
	1884–1915	Flag of the German Empire	Black, white, and red horizontal tricolour.
	1884–1915	Colonial flag	Black, white, and red horizontal tricolour with the German Eagle in the center.
	1914	First proposal for German South-West Africa	Black, white, and red horizontal tricolour with the arms in the center (a bull in an blue field and a sixteen-pointed star).
	1914	Second proposal for German South-West Africa	Black, white, and red horizontal tricolour with the arms in the center (a bull in an blue field and a sixteen-pointed star, and the German Eagle).
	1884–1888	German emperor's standard	
	1888–1915	German emperor's standard	
	1884–1901	Empress Augusta and Empress Victoria's standard	
	1888–1915	Empress Augusta Viktoria's standard	
	1884–1888	Standard of the crown prince	
	1888–1915	Standard of the crown prince	

=== United Kingdom and South Africa (1878–1990) ===
Flag	Date	Use	Description
	1878–1990	The Union Flag, also commonly known as the Union Jack. Used as the flag of the United Kingdom	A superimposition of the flags of England and Scotland with the Saint Patrick's Saltire (representing Ireland).
	1878–1910	Cape Colony	A Blue Ensign defaced with the shield-of-arms of Cape Colony.
	1910–1912	Merchant flag of the Union of South Africa	A British Red Ensign with the shield of the coat of arms of the Union of South Africa.
	1910–1928	State ensign of the Union of South Africa	A British Blue Ensign with the shield of the coat of arms of the Union of South Africa.
	1912–1951	Merchant flag of the Union of South Africa	A British Red Ensign with the shield of the coat of arms of the Union of South Africa on a white roundel.
	1928–1982	Flag of South Africa	Orange, white, and blue horizontal stripes, on the white stripe, a backwards Union Flag towards the hoist, the Orange Free State flag hanging vertically, and the flag of Transvaal towards the fly. Used for both the Union and later Republic of South Africa.
	1982–1990	Flag of South Africa	The flag using a lighter shade of "Solway" blue as specified by the South African government.
	1878–1910	Flag of the governor of the Cape Colony	
	1910–1931	Flag of the governor-general of South Africa	
	1931–1952	Flag of the governor-general of South Africa	
	1952–1961	Flag of the governor-general of South Africa	
	1961–1984	Flag of the state president of South Africa	
	1984–1990	Flag of the state president of South Africa	
	1878–1961	The royal standard of the United Kingdom (except Scotland)	A banner of the sovereign's arms, the royal coat of arms of the United Kingdom.
	1901–1928	Standard of Queen Alexandra, consort of Edward VII	The royal coat of arms of the United Kingdom impaled with the arms of the king of Denmark.
	1910–1953	Standard of Queen Mary, consort of George V	The royal coat of arms of the United Kingdom impaled with the arms of Prince Francis, Duke of Teck (the Queen's father), and Prince Adolphus, Duke of Cambridge (the Queen's maternal grandfather).
	1936–1961	Standard of Queen Elizabeth, consort of George VI	The royal coat of arms of the United Kingdom impaled with the arms of the Earl of Strathmore: "bows" and "lions".
	1952–1961	Standard of Prince Philip, consort of Elizabeth II	A banner of the coat of arms of the Duke of Edinburgh, first quarter representing Denmark, second quarter Greece, third quarter the Mountbatten family, fourth quarter Edinburgh.
	1952–1961	Personal flag of Elizabeth II, used by the Queen in her capacity as Head of the Commonwealth	A crowned letter 'E' in gold, surrounded by a garland of gold roses on a blue background.

== See also ==
- Flag of Namibia
- Coat of arms of Namibia
