= List of Tunisian flags =

List of flags used by the nation of Tunisia

This is a list of flags, banners and standards used in Tunisia.

== State flag ==
Flag	Date	Use	Description
	1999–present	Flag of Tunisia	A red field with a centered white sun–disc containing a red five–pointed star surrounded by a red crescent.
	1999–present	Flag of Tunisia (vertical)	A red field with a centered white sun–disc containing a red five–pointed star surrounded by a red crescent.
	1999–present	Presidential flag of Tunisia	A red field with a centered white sun–disc with a golden border containing a red five–pointed star surrounded by a red crescent. Golden Arabic script is located just outside the disc, towards the upper hoist.
	1956–present	Military flag of Tunisia	A horizontal bicolour flag of white and red with the emblem of the armed forces in the center.

== Municipality flags ==
Flag	Date	Use	Description
	?–present	Flag of the city of Sousse	A horizontal bicolour of blue and yellow with the emblem of the city in the center.

== Historical flags ==
Flag	Date	Use	Description
	1229–1337	Flag of the Hafsid Sultanate of Tunis	A red field with a white crescent moon in the center and a three-tongued fringe at the fly.
	1424–1550	Flag of the Hafsid Sultanate of Tunis	A yellow field with a white crescent moon and a five-pointed star in the center.
	1550–1574	Flag of the Hafsid Sultanate of Tunis	A white field with a blue crescent moon in the center and a vertical blue band at the hoist.
	1574–1705	Flag of the Eyalet of Tunis	A red field with three golden crescent moons off–centered towards the hoist.
	1705–1827	Flag of the Beylik of Tunis	A banner of five horizontal stripes; blue stripes at top and bottom, red stripes interior to those, and a green central stripe. The fly edge of the flag is partially scalloped.
	1827–1881	Flag of the Beylik of Tunis	A red field with a centered white sun–disc containing a red five–pointed star surrounded by a red crescent.
	1827–1881	Monarchic flag of the Beylik of Tunis	A banner of seven horizontal stripes; 4 red strips, 2 golden and 1 green with 31 6–pointed stars, 24 discs and a 2 pointed sword in the center.
	1881–1885	Unofficial flag of the French protectorate of Tunisia	A red field with a centered white sun–disc containing a red five–pointed star surrounded by a red crescent with the French tricolour in the canton.
	1885–1956	Flag of the French protectorate of Tunisia	A red field with a centered white sun–disc containing a red five–pointed star surrounded by a red crescent.
	1956–1957	Flag of the Kingdom of Tunisia	A red field with a centered white sun–disc containing a red five–pointed star surrounded by a red crescent.
	1957–1959	Flag of the Republic of Tunisia	A red field with a centered white sun–disc containing a red five–pointed star surrounded by a red crescent.
	1959–1999	Flag of the Republic of Tunisia	A red field with a centered white sun–disc containing a red five–pointed star surrounded by a red crescent.

== See also ==
- Flag of Tunisia
- Coat of arms of Tunisia
