= List of Rwandan flags =

The following is a list of flags related with Rwanda.

== National flag ==
| Flag | Date | Use | Description |
|---|---|---|---|
| | 2001–present | Flag of Rwanda | A horizontal tricolour of light blue (double width), yellow, and green; charged with a golden-yellow sun in the upper fly side corner. |

== Government flag ==
| Flag | Date | Use | Description |
|---|---|---|---|
| | 2001–present | Presidential flag of Rwanda | A white field with the national seal in the center. |

== Ethnic group flag ==
| Flag | Date | Use | Description |
|---|---|---|---|
| | ?–present | Flag of the Twa people | |

== Political party flags ==
| Flag | Date | Use | Description |
|---|---|---|---|
| | 1990–present | Flag of the Interahamwe | |
| | 1987–present | Flag of the Rwandan Patriotic Front | |
| | 1975–1994 | Flag of the MRND | |
| | 1992–1994 | Flag of the Coalition for the Defence of the Republic | |

== Historical flags ==
| Flag | Date | Use | Description |
|---|---|---|---|
| | 1962–2001 | Second flag of the Republic of Rwanda | A vertical tricolour of red, yellow, and green with a black R in the center. |
| | 1959–1961 | First flag of the Republic of Rwanda | A vertical tricolour of red, yellow, and green. |
| | 1926–1945 | First flag of the Belgian Congo | |
| | 1916–1959 | Flag of the Kingdom of Belgium | |
| | 1890–1916 | Flag of the German Empire | |
| | 1890–1916 | German colonial flag | |
| | 1890–1916 | Flags of the German East Africa Company | |
| | 1914–1916 | Proposed flag for German East Africa | |

== See also ==
- Flag of Rwanda
- Seal of Rwanda
