= List of Sudanese flags =

The following is a list of flags used in Sudan.

== National flag ==
Flag	Date	Use	Description
	1970–present	Flag of Sudan	A horizontal tricolour of red, white, and black; with a green triangle based at the hoist.
	1970–present	Flag of Sudan	Similar but 2:3 ratio.
	1970–present	Flag of Sudan (vertical)	

== Government flag ==
Flag	Date	Use	Description
	1970–present	Flag of the President of Sudan	A horizontal tricolour of red, white, and black; with a green triangle based at the hoist and the national emblem in the center of the white stripe.

== Ethnic group flags ==
Flag	Date	Use	Description
	?–present	Flag of the Daza people	A horizontal bicolour of yellow and black divided with two thin lines of red and blue and a black star in the center of the yellow stripe.
	?–present	Flag of the Hausa people	A white field with the Dagin Arewa or Northern knot in the center.

== Military flags ==
Flag	Date	Use	Description
	1956–present	Flag of the Sudanese Air Force	A blue field with the national flag in the canton, and the air force's roundel in the fly.
	1970–present	Naval ensign of Sudan	A white field with the national flag in the canton.
	2010–present	Flag of the 9th Airborne Division	A red field with a golden emblem and Arabic text of the Shahada above and "9th Airborne Division" below.

== Political party flags ==
Flag	Date	Use	Description
Current
	1945–present	Flag of the National Umma Party	
	1946–present	Flag of the Sudanese Communist Party	A red field with white Arabic script reading "Sudanese Communist Party".
	1952–present	Flag of the Democratic Unionist Party	A horizontal tricolour of blue, yellow, and green; identical to the first flag of independent Sudan used between 1956 and 1970.
	1957–present	Flag of the Beja Congress	A horizontal tricolour of blue, yellow, and green with a vertical 1/4-width red bar at the hoist.
	Unknown–present	Flag of the Sudan Liberation Movement/Army al-Nur	Four horizontal bands of black, red, blue, and green with a white star in the center.
	Unknown–present	Flag of the Sudan Liberation Movement/Army Tumbour	
	Unknown–present	Flag of the Sudan Liberation Movement/Army Minnawi	
	2011–present	Flag of the Sudan People's Liberation Movement-North	A horizontal tricolour of black, red, and blue, fimbriated with white stripes; with a green equilateral triangle based on the hoist side bearing a gold five-pointed star within a red disc.
Former
	1923–1924	Flag of the White Flag League	A white field with the flag of the Kingdom of Egypt in the canton and an outline of the Nile River in blue along the fly side.
	1965–1970	Flag of the Azania Liberation Front	
	1971–1985	Flag of the Sudanese Socialist Union	A white field with the logo of the party in the center.
	2011–2023	Flag of the Sudan Revolutionary Front	A horizontal tricolour of black, red, and green; charged with a blue five-pointed star within a yellow disc at the center.

== Sub-national flags ==
Flag	Date	Use	Description
	?–present	Flag of Blue Nile State	
	?–present	Flag of Central Darfur	
	?–present	Flag of North Darfur	
	?–present	Flag of South Darfur	
	?–present	Flag of West Darfur	
	?–present	Flag of Kassala State	
	?–present	Flag of Khartoum State	
	?–present	Flag of Al Qadarif State	
	?–present	Flag of River Nile State	
	?–present	Flag of the Abyei Area	

== Historical flags ==
=== Makuria ===
Flag	Date	Use	Description
	400–1590	Flag of the Kingdom of Makuria	A white field with a black cross in the center.

=== Alodia ===
Flag	Date	Use	Description
	500–1500	Flag of the Kingdom of Alodia	A golden field with a white disc in the center and a red cross inside the disc.

=== Ottoman Empire (Turkish Sudan) ===
Flag	Date	Use	Description
	1820–1844	Flag of the Ottoman Empire	A red field with a white crescent moon and an eight-pointed star.
	1844–1899	Flag of the Ottoman Empire	A red field with a white crescent moon and a five-pointed star.
	1820–1844	Flag of Ottoman Egypt	Red flag with a white crescent moon and a white seven-pointed star.
	1844–1867	Flag of self-declared Khedivate of Egypt introduced by Muhammad Ali	Red flag with a white crescent containing a white five-pointed star.
	1867–1881	Flag of the Khedivate of Egypt	Red flag with a white crescent and three white five-pointed stars.
	1881–1899	Flag of the Khedivate of Egypt under British occupation	

=== Mahdist State ===
Flag	Date	Use	Description
	1881–1899	Flag used during the Mahdist Revolt and in Mahdist Sudan	A golden field with blue and red borders and blue Arabic script in the center.
	1881–1899	Black Standard used in Mahdist Sudan	A simple black field.

=== Anglo-Egyptian Sudan ===
Flag	Date	Use	Description
	1899–1956	Flag of the United Kingdom, also known as the Union Jack	A superimposition of the flags of England and Scotland with the Saint Patrick's Saltire (representing Ireland).
	1899–1914	Flag of the Khedivate of Egypt under British occupation	
	1914–1922	Flag of the Sultanate of Egypt	Red flag with three white crescents, each containing a white five-pointed star.
	1922–1956	Flag of the Kingdom of Egypt and the co-official flag of the Arab Republic of Egypt	Green flag with a white crescent containing three white five-pointed stars.
	1952–1956	Flag of the 1952 Egyptian Revolution and the Republic of Egypt; The green monarchical flag remained the national flag of Egypt until 1958, even after the proclamation of the Republic.	Following the Revolution of 1952, the Free Officers retained the flag of the Kingdom, but also introduced the former Republic of Egypt flag colors of red, white, and black horizontal bands, with the emblem of the Revolution, the Eagle of Saladin, in the center band, with a green escutcheon with a white crescent and five stars.
	1899–1956	Flag of the British Governor General	A Union Jack defaced with the emblem of Sudan.
	1925–1956	Flag of the Sudan Defence Force	A horizontal triband of black, white, and black with two crossed swords in the center.
	April 1955	Provisional flag of Sudan used during the Afro-Asian Conference (April 1955)	A white field with "SUDAN" written in red in the center.

=== Independence ===
Flag	Date	Use	Description
	1956–1970	Flag of Independent Sudan	A horizontal tricolour of blue, yellow, and green.
	1956–1970	Flag of Independent Sudan	Similar but 2:3 ratio.
	1962–1970	Naval ensign of Sudan	A white field with the national flag in the canton.
	1956–1970	Flag of the Sudanese Customs Service	

== See also ==
- Flag of Sudan
- Emblem of Sudan
