= List of Burundian flags =

This is a list of the flags of Burundi. for the national flag, see Flag of Burundi.

== National flag ==
Flag	Date	Use	Description
	1982–present	National flag and ensign	

== Ethnic group flags ==
Flag	Date	Use	Description
		Flag of the Twa People	

== Political party flags ==
Flag	Date	Use	Description
	1998–present	Flag of the CNDD–FDD	
	1994–present	Flag of the CNDD	
	1992–present	Flag of the FRODEBU	
	1980–present	Flag of the FNL	
	1960–present	Flag of the UPRONA	

== Historical flags ==
Flag	Date	Use	Description
	1967–1982	Second flag of the Republic of Burundi	
	1972	Possible rendition of the green-red-green flag of Martyazo	
	1966–1967	First flag of the Republic of Burundi	
	1966	Second and last flag of the Kingdom of Burundi	
	1962–1966	Second Royal standard of the Kingdom of Burundi	
	1962–1966	First flag of the Kingdom of Burundi	
	1962–1966	First flag of the Kingdom of Burundi (drum variant)	
	1961–1962	Flag of Burundi under Ruanda-Urundi	
	1959–1962	First Royal standard of the Kingdom of Burundi	
	1916–1962	Flag of the Kingdom of Belgium	
	1926–1945	First flag of the Belgian Congo	
	1890–1916	Flag of the German Empire	
	1890–1916	Colonial flag	
	1890–1916	Flags of the German East Africa Company	
	1914–1916	Proposed flag for German East Africa	

== See also ==
- Flag of Burundi
- Coat of arms of Burundi
