= List of flags of Equatorial Guinea =

This is a list of flags used in Equatorial Guinea in Africa. For more information about the national flag, see flag of Equatorial Guinea.

== National flag ==
Flag	Date	Use	Description
	1979–present	State flag of Equatorial Guinea	A horizontal tricolor of green, white, and red with a blue isosceles triangle based on the hoist side and the national coat of arms of Equatorial Guinea centered in the white band.

== Ethnic group flags ==
Flag	Date	Use	Description
		Bubi nationalist flag	A horizontal tricolour of blue, white, and green with a black four-pointed star centered in the white band.
		Bubi tribal flag	Nine horizontal stripes alternating red and green; on a blue field in the canton, a white triangle with two flutes.

== Municipality flags ==
Flag	Date	Use	Description
		Flag of Malabo	A cyan field with the coat of arms of Malabo in the center.

== Historical flags ==
Flag	Date	Use	Description
	1973–1979	Third state flag of Equatorial Guinea	A horizontal tricolor of green, white, and red with a blue isosceles triangle based on the hoist side and the emblem of Francisco Nguema centered in the white band.
	1969–1973	Second state flag of Equatorial Guinea	Identical to the modern flag.
	1968–1969	First state flag of Equatorial Guinea	A horizontal tricolor of green, white, and red with a blue isosceles triangle based on the hoist side.
	1945–1968	Flag of Francoist Spain	Similar to the previous flag, but with a bigger eagle.
	1938–1945	Flag of Francoist Spain	Three horizontal stripes: red, yellow, and red, the yellow stripe being twice as wide as each red stripe with the francoist eagle coat of arms off-centred toward the hoist.
	1936–1938	Flag of Francoist Spain	Three horizontal stripes: red, yellow, and red, the yellow stripe being twice as wide as each red stripe with the coat of arms centered in the yellow band.
	1931–1936	Flag of the Second Spanish Republic	A horizontal tricolour of red, yellow, and purple with the coat of arms centered in the yellow band.
	1873–1874	Flag of the First Spanish Republic	Three horizontal stripes: red, yellow, and red, the yellow stripe being twice as wide as each red stripe with the coat of arms off-centred toward the hoist.
	1827–1858	Flag of the United Kingdom (during the British rule in Bioko)	A superimposition of the flags of England and Scotland with the Saint Patrick's Saltire (representing Ireland).
	1808–1813	Flag of Napoleonic Spain	A white field with the royal coat of arms off-centred toward the hoist.
	1808–1813	Flag of the First French Empire	A vertical tricolour of blue, white, and red.
	1874–1931	Flag of the Kingdom of Spain	Three horizontal stripes: red, yellow, and red, the yellow stripe being twice as wide as each red stripe with the royal coat of arms off-centred toward the hoist.
	1785–1873	Flag of the Kingdom of Spain	Three horizontal stripes: red, yellow, and red, the yellow stripe being twice as wide as each red stripe with the royal coat of arms off-centred toward the hoist.
	1662–1664	States Flag	A horizontal tricolour of red, white, and light blue.
	1662–1664	The Prince's Flag (during the Dutch occupations of Annobón)	A horizontal tricolour of orange, white, and blue.
	1641–1649	The Prince's Flag (during the Dutch occupations of Annobón)	A horizontal tricolour of orange, white, and blue.
	1580–1701	Flag of the Kingdom of Spain	A red saltire resembling two crossed, roughly-pruned (knotted) branches, on a white field.
	1578–1580	Flag of the Kingdom of Portugal	A white field with the coat of arms in the center.
	1521–1578	Flag of the Kingdom of Portugal	A white field with the coat of arms in the center.
	1495–1521	Flag of the Kingdom of Portugal	A white field with the coat of arms in the center.
	1485–1495	Flag of the Kingdom of Portugal	Five blue escutcheons each charged with five bezants on a white field. Border: red with seven yellow castles.
	1472–1485	Flag of the Kingdom of Portugal	Five blue escutcheons each charged with an undetermined number of bezants on a white field. Border: red with yellow castles and a green cross of the Order of Aviz.

== See also ==
- Flag of Equatorial Guinea
- Coat of arms of Equatorial Guinea
