= List of Zimbabwean flags =

This is a list of flags used in Zimbabwe.

== National flag ==
Flag	Date	Use	Description
	1980–	National flag of Zimbabwe	Seven equal horizontal stripes of green, yellow, red, black, red, yellow, and green. A black-edged white triangle based at the hoist contains a red five-pointed star on which is superimposed a representation of the Zimbabwe Bird in yellow.

== Presidential flag ==
Flag	Date	Use	Description
	1987–	Flag of the president of Zimbabwe	A green background with the Zimbabwean coat of arms in the centre, with a black-edged white triangle based at the hoist containing a red five-pointed star on which is superimposed a representation of the Zimbabwe Bird in yellow. In the top and bottom fly corners there are horizontal stripes of yellow, red, black, red, and yellow.

== Military flags ==
Flag	Date	Use	Description
	1980–	Flag of the Zimbabwe National Army	A red background with the Zimbabwe National Army emblem in the centre.
	1980–	Flag of the Air Force of Zimbabwe	A light blue background with the Zimbabwe national flag in the canton and the emblem of the Zimbabwe Air Force in the fly.
	1980–	Flag of the Zimbabwe Defence Forces	A vertical bicolour of red and blue with the emblem of the Zimbabwe Defence Forces in the centre.

== Political party flags ==
Flag	Date	Use	Description
	c. mid-1970s–	Flag of the Zimbabwe African National Union-Patriotic Front (ZANU PF)	Concentric rectangular stripes of green, yellow, red, and black.
	1999–	Flag of the Movement for Democratic Change (MDC)	Four equal horizontal stripes of green, yellow, red, and black with the party open-hand emblem in the centre and "MDC" in white on the black stripe.
		Flag of the Liberal Democrats	
		Flag of the Zimbabwe African People's Union (ZAPU)	
		Flag of the Mthwakazi Republic Party	

== Town flags ==
Flag	Date	Use	Description
		Flag of Bulawayo	The coat of arms of Bulawayo on a blue background.
		Flag of Victoria Falls	Victoria Falls coat of arms in the centre.
	1986–	Flag of Chitungwiza	Orange-white-orange horizontal triband with the city’s coat of arms at the centre.
		Flag of Kariba	Kariba coat of arms in the centre.
		Flag of Chinhoyi	Chinhoyi coat of arms in the centre.
		Flag of Kadoma	Kadoma coat of arms in the centre.
		Flag of Kwekwe	Kwekwe coat of arms in the centre.
		Flag of Plumtree	Plumtree coat of arms in the centre.
		Flag of Gokwe	Gokwe coat of arms in the centre.
	1986–	Flag of Gweru	Vertical triband of red and white with the Gweru coat of arms on the central white stripe.
	1982–	Flag of Harare	The Zimbabwe bird on the bottom stripe.
		Flag of Marondera	Marondera coat of arms on a green background.
		Flag of Hwange	Hwange coat of arms in the centre.
	1985–	Flag of Mutare	Mutare coat of arms on a white background.
		Flag of Masvingo	Masvingo Coat of Arms in the centre.

== Historical flags ==
Flag	Date	Use	Description
	1890–1923	Flag of the British South Africa Company (BSAC)	The BSAC flag was a Union Jack defaced in the centre with a white roundel with the BSAC logo.
	1923–1953, 1963–1964, 1979–1980	Flag of Southern Rhodesia	A Blue Ensign with the shield from the Southern Rhodesian coat of arms in the fly.
	1953–1963	Flag of the Central African Federation	A Blue Ensign with the shield from the federal coat of arms in the fly, showing the amalgamation of Northern Rhodesia, Southern Rhodesia, and Nyasaland.
	1964–1968	Flag of Rhodesia	A sky-blue ensign with the shield from the Rhodesian coat of arms in the fly.
	1968–1979	Flag of Rhodesia (not internationally recognized)	A green-white-green vertical triband with the full coat of arms of Rhodesia in the centre of the white stripe.
	1979	Flag of Zimbabwe Rhodesia	A red-white-green horizontal tricolor with a white-fimbriated black vertical band at the hoist containing a representation of the Zimbabwe Bird in the canton in yellow.
	1981–1986	Flag of the president of Zimbabwe	The flag of Zimbabwe defaced with a white square bearing the Zimbabwean coat of arms.

== Ethnic groups ==
Flag	Date	Use	Description
		Matabele people	

== See also ==
- Coat of arms of Zimbabwe
- Flag of Zimbabwe
- Simudzai Mureza wedu WeZimbabwe
