= List of flags of Kenya =

This is a list of flags used in Kenya.

== National flag ==
| Flag | Date | Use | Description |
|---|---|---|---|
| | 1963–present | Flag of Kenya | The flag is based on that of the Kenya African National Union. The colours symbolise black majority, red for the blood shed during the struggle for freedom and green for natural wealth; the white fimbriation was added later and symbolises peace. The traditional Maasai shield and two spears symbolise the defence of all the things mentioned above. |

== Military ==
| Flag | Date | Use | Description |
|---|---|---|---|
| | 1964–present | Defence Forces flag | |
| | 1964–present | Air Force flag | |
| | 1964–present | Naval ensign | |
| | 1964–present | Presidential colour of the Navy | |

== Presidential ==
| Flag | Date | Use | Description |
|---|---|---|---|
| | 1964–1970 | First presidential standard of Kenya | |
| | 1970–1978 | Presidential standard of Jomo Kenyatta | |
| | 1978–2002 | Presidential standard of Daniel Arap Moi | |
| | 2002–2013 | Presidential standard of Mwai Kibaki | |
| | 2013–2022 | Presidential standard of Uhuru Kenyatta | |
| | 2022–present | Presidential standard of William Ruto, Incumbent President of Kenya | |

== Historical ==
=== Portuguese rule ===
| Flag | Date | Use | Description |
|---|---|---|---|
| | 1498–1521 | Kingdom of Portugal | A white field with the coat of arms in the center. |
| | 1521–1578 | Kingdom of Portugal | A white field with the coat of arms in the center. |
| | 1578–1640 | Kingdom of Portugal | A white field with the coat of arms in the center. |
| | 1616–1640 | Kingdom of Portugal | A white field with the coat of arms in the center. (putative flag) |
| | 1640–1667 | Kingdom of Portugal | A white field with the coat of arms in the center. |
| | 1667–1698 | Kingdom of Portugal | A white field with the coat of arms in the center. |

=== Omani rule ===
| Flag | Date | Use | Description |
|---|---|---|---|
| | 1698–1888 | Omani Empire | A white field with a red sword and red Arabic script below. |

=== German Wituland ===
| Flag | Date | Use | Description |
|---|---|---|---|
| | 1885–1890 | German East Africa Company | |
| | 1885–1890 | German Empire | A tricolour, made of three equal horizontal bands coloured black (top), white, and red (bottom). |
| | 1885–1890 | Colonial flag | Horizontal black-white-red fields with the German Reichsadler in a white circle in the middle. |
| | 1890 | German Wituland | A vertical bicolour of white (hoist) and red (fly) with a white five-pointed star in the red band. |

=== British East Africa Company ===
| Flag | Date | Use | Description |
|---|---|---|---|
| | 1893–1920 | Witu Protectorate | A Union Flag (proportions: 15:27) with a red border, proportions: 37:57 |
| | 1893–1920 | Ensign of Witu Protectorate | Proportions: 1:2 |
| | 1880–1895 | Governor's flag | A Union Flag defaced with a golden sun with a crown above it. |
| | 1880–1895 | State ensign | A British Blue Ensign; in the fly, a golden sun with a crown above it. |
| | 1880–1895 | Civil ensign | A British Red Ensign; in the fly, a golden sun with a crown above it. |

=== British East Africa Protectorate ===
| Flag | Date | Use | Description |
|---|---|---|---|
| | 1895–1921 | East Africa Protectorate | A British Blue Ensign with the emblem of the protectorate, a red lion, in a white disc in the fly. |

=== British Protectorate of Kenya ===
| Flag | Date | Use | Description |
|---|---|---|---|
| | 1921–1963 | Colony and Protectorate of Kenya | A British Blue Ensign with a red lion in the fly. |
| | 1952–1962 | Royal East African Navy | A British Blue Ensign with the emblem of the Royal East African Navy in the fly. |

=== Italian occupation ===
| Flag | Date | Use | Description |
|---|---|---|---|
| | 1940–1941 | Kingdom of Italy | An Italian tricolour with Savoy shield and Royal crown in the middle. |

== Cities ==
| Flag | Date | Use | Description |
|---|---|---|---|
| | | Flag of Nairobi | A heraldic fountain on a quartered yellow and green background. |
