= List of Guinean flags =

The following is a list of Flags in Guinea (Africa).

== National flag ==
Flag	Date	Use	Description
	1958–present	Flag of Guinea	A vertical tricolour of red, yellow, and green.
	1958–present	Flag of Guinea (vertical)	

== Presidential flags ==
Flag	Date	Use	Description
	1993–present	Presidential flag of Guinea	A vertical tricolour of red, yellow, and green with the national coat of arms in the center.
	1984–1993	Presidential flag of Guinea	A vertical tricolour of red, yellow, and green with the national coat of arms in the center.
	1958–1984	Presidential flag of Guinea	A vertical tricolour of red, yellow, and green with the national coat of arms in the center.

== Capital city flag ==
Flag	Date	Use	Description
	1958–present	Flag of Conakry	A white field with the arms and the name of the city in the center.

== Historical flags ==
=== Mali Empire ===
Flag	Date	Use	Description
	c.1324	Imperial flag of Musa I (possible)	A reconstruction of the banner used by Musa I on the Hajj, a possible historical flag of the Mali Empire, consisting of a yellow rectangle centered on a red field.

=== Imamate of Futa Jallon ===
Flag	Date	Use	Description
	1725–1896	Flag of the Imamate of Futa Jallon	A white pennon with green Arabic text.

=== Wassoulou Empire ===
Flag	Date	Use	Description
	1878–1898	Flag of the Wassoulou Empire	A horizontal tricolor of blue, cyan, and white with a red triangle based on the hoist side and a seven-pointed star inside of the triangle with a little red diamond inside the star.

=== French rule ===
Flag	Date	Use	Description
	1890–1958	Flag of the French Third Republic, the Provisional Government of the French Republic and the French Fourth Republic	A vertical tricolour of blue, white, and red (proportions 3:2).
	1940–1942	Flag of Vichy France	A vertical tricolour of blue, white, and red with an axe and seven golden stars.
	1942–1944	Flag of Free France	A vertical tricolour of blue, white, and red with the Cross of Lorraine.
Colonial flags
	1896–1912	Flag of the French Protectorate of Futa Jallon	A white pennon with the French tricolor in the canton and green Arabic text.

== See also ==
- Flag of Guinea
- Coat of arms of Guinea
