= Flag of Harare =

Flag of the capital city of Zimbabwe

Harare
- Use: Civil flag
- Proportion: 1:2
- Adopted: April 18, 1982
- Design: A horizontal fimbriated tricolour of blue, yellow, red, yellow and blue. Upper stripe contains sun rays, middle section contains two tobacco leaves and bottom stripe has the Zimbabwe bird.

The flag of Harare is the civil flag for the capital city of Zimbabwe.

== History ==
The flag was adopted on 18 April 1982, when the capital city of Zimbabwe was renamed Harare from the original, Salisbury. When the city was renamed it adopted a new flag and a new coat of arms replacing those of Salisbury, which bore the Latin motto Discrimine Salus ("In Discrimination there is Safety"), the family motto of William Fairbridge, the first mayor of the city.

== Similarities ==
The Flag of Harare, like the Flag of Zimbabwe, contains the Zimbabwe Bird, the country's national symbol. The flag also contains similarities to other African flags in that it contains some of the Pan-African colours.

== Gallery ==
Current flag of Harare

The coat of arms of Harare

The flag of Salisbury

The coat of arms of Salisbury
