= List of Tanzanian flags =

The following is a list of flags and banners used in Tanzania.

== National flag ==
Flag	Date	Use	Description
	1964–present	Flag of Tanzania	A yellow-edged black band cuts diagonally from the lower hoist-side corner to the upper fly: the upper triangle is green and the lower triangle is bright blue.

== Government flags ==
Flag	Date	Use	Description
	1964–present	Presidential flag of Tanzania	A green field with a blue border with the national coat of arms (without humans) placed at the center.

=== German East Africa ===
Flag	Date	Use	Description
	1884–1891	Flags of the German East Africa Company	A white lion, white tree, and five white stars on a red field, surrounded by a black and white patterned border.
	1884–1891	Flags of the German East Africa Company	A white field with a centred black cross; five white stars on a red field in the canton.
	1891–1918	Flag of the Imperial Colonial Office	A tricolor made of three equal horizontal bands coloured black (top), white, and red (bottom) defaced with the Reichsadler in the centre.
	1904–?	Flag of the East African Railroad Company	A flag divided per saltire into four panels of white (top and bottom), black (hoist side), and red (fly side), charged with the company's emblem.

=== Sultanate of Zanzibar ===
Flag	Date	Use	Description
	1952–1963	Flag of the British Resident Minister of Zanzibar	The flag of Britain defaced with the emblem of the Resident Minister of Zanzibar.

== Regional flags ==
Flag	Date	Use	Description
	2005–present	Flag of Zanzibar	Horizontal tricolour of blue, black, and green with the national flag of Tanzania in the canton.
	1964–2005	Flag of Zanzibar	Zanzibar formerly used the national flag.

== Political flags ==
Flag	Date	Use	Description
	1954–1977	Flag of the Tanganyika African National Union	A horizontal triband of green, black, and green.
	1957–1977	Flag of the Afro-Shirazi Party	A tricolor, made of three equal horizontal bands coloured bright blue (top), black, and green (bottom) defaced with a yellow hoe in the centre.
	1977–present	Flag of the Chama Cha Mapinduzi	A green field with the party emblem in the upper hoist corner.

== Historical flags ==
=== Kilwa Sultanate ===
Flag	Date	Use	Description
	957–1513	Flag of the Kilwa Sultanate	A swallowtailed bicoloured banner of yellow and red with two white crescent moons.

=== Portuguese Zanzibar ===
Flag	Date	Use	Description
	1505–1521	Flag of the Kingdom of Portugal	A white field with the coat of arms in the center.
	1521–1578	Flag of the Kingdom of Portugal	A white field with the coat of arms in the center.
	1578–1640	Flag of the Kingdom of Portugal	A white field with the coat of arms in the center.
	1616–1640 (putative)	Flag of the Kingdom of Portugal	A white field with the coat of arms in the center.
	1640–1667	Flag of the Kingdom of Portugal	A white field with the coat of arms in the center.
	1667–1698	Flag of the Kingdom of Portugal	A white field with the coat of arms in the center.

=== Omani Zanzibar ===
Flag	Date	Use	Description
	1698–1856	Flag of the Omani Empire	A white field with a red sword with red Arabic script below.

=== Sultanate of Zanzibar ===
Flag	Date	Use	Description
	1856–1861	Flag of the Sultanate of Zanzibar	Three yellow bands with three green crescent moons in the top stripe, two in the middle, and three in the bottom. Separating the yellow bands are thin stripes of red and green. The top and bottom edges of the flag have three thin stripes of red, white, and green.
	1896–1963	Flag of the Sultanate of Zanzibar (British protectorate)	A simple red field.
	1963–1964	Flag of the Sultanate of Zanzibar	A red field with a green disk in the centre bearing two yellow cloves.

=== German rule ===
Flag	Date	Use	Description
	1891–1918	Flag of the German Empire	A tricolour made of three equal horizontal bands coloured black (top), white, and red (bottom).
	1918–1919	Flag of the Weimar Republic	A tricolour made of three equal horizontal bands coloured black (top), red, and gold (bottom).

=== British rule ===
Flag	Date	Use	Description
	1890–1963	Flag of the United Kingdom (used dually in Zanzibar and Tanganyika)	A superimposition of the flags of England and Scotland with the Saint Patrick's Saltire (representing Ireland).
	1919–1961	Flag of Tanganyika Territory	A British Red Ensign with the Emblem of the British League of Nations mandate (a British UN Trust Territory after 1946) centred on the outer half of the flag.

=== Republic of Tanganyika ===
Flag	Date	Use	Description
	1961–1964	Flag of Tanganyika	A green field with a gold-edged black horizontal band in the centre.

=== People's Republic of Zanzibar ===
Flag	Date	Use	Description
	January 1964	Flag of the People's Republic of Zanzibar	A horizontal tricolour of black, yellow, and blue.
	January 1964 – April 1964	Flag of the People's Republic of Zanzibar	A horizontal tricolour of blue, black, and green.

== Proposed flag ==
Flag	Date	Use	Description
	1914	Proposed flag of German East Africa	A tricolor made of three equal horizontal bands coloured black (top), white, and red (bottom) defaced in the center with a proposed coat of arms (a lion's head on a red shield).

== See also ==
- Flag of Tanzania
- Coat of arms of Tanzania
