= List of Mauritian flags =

This is a list of flags used in Mauritius.

== National flag ==
Flag	Date	Use	Description
	1968–present	Flag of Mauritius	Four horizontal bands of red, blue, yellow, and green. From the National Flag Act 2015: Red represents the struggle for freedom and independence. Blue represents the Indian Ocean in the middle of which Mauritius is situated. Yellow represents the new light of independence. Green represents the agriculture of Mauritius and its colour throughout the 12 months of the year.

== Presidential flag ==
Flag	Date	Use	Description
	1992–present	Standard of the president of Mauritius	The flag of Mauritius defaced in the centre with a white disc containing the coat of arms of Mauritius over two curved golden laurel leaves and the letters "RM" (République de Maurice) in gold.

== Ensigns ==
Flag	Date	Use	Description
	Unknown–present	Civil ensign of Mauritius	A red field with the flag of Mauritius in the canton and a white disc containing the Mauritian coat of arms in the fly.
	Unknown–present	Government ensign of Mauritius	A blue field with the flag of Mauritius in the canton and the Mauritian coat of arms in the fly.
	1974–present	Naval ensign of Mauritius	A design of red, white, and blue vertical stripes of unequal widths defaced by a central anchor/key emblem.

== Subnational flags ==
Flag	Date	Use	Description
		Flag of Port Louis	A banner of the coat of arms of Port Louis. Four white anchors and five gold fleurs-de-lis arranged on a field of dark blue.
		Flag of Quatre Bornes	The coat of arms of Quatre Bornes on a white field.
		Flag of Rodrigues	The coat of arms of Rodrigues on a white field surrounded by a border of red, blue, yellow and green.

== Historical flags ==
=== Colonial flags ===
Flag	Date	Use	Description
	1923–1968	Flag of British Mauritius	A British Blue Ensign with the Mauritian coat of arms in the fly.
	1906–1968	Civil ensign of British Mauritius	A British Red Ensign with the Mauritian coat of arms on a white disc in the fly.
	1906–1923	Flag of British Mauritius	A British Blue Ensign with the Mauritian coat of arms on a white disc in the fly.
	1869–1906	Flag of British Mauritius	A British Blue Ensign with the 1869 arms of Mauritius on a white disc in the fly.
	1810–1869	Flag of British Mauritius	The Union Flag of the United Kingdom.
	1794–1810	Flag of French Mauritius	A vertical tricolour of blue, white, and red.
	1790–1794	Flag of French Mauritius	A vertical tricolour of red, white, and blue.
	1715–1792	Flag of French Mauritius	A white field with several fleurs-de-lis.
	1652–1672	Flag of Dutch Mauritius	A horizontal tricolour of red, white, and blue.
	1598–1710	Flag of Dutch Mauritius	A horizontal tricolour of orange, white, and blue.
	1578–1598	Flag of Portuguese Mauritius	A white banner with the coat of arms in the center.
	1521–1578	Flag of Portuguese Mauritius	A white banner with the coat of arms in the center.
	1511–1521	Flag of Portuguese Mauritius	A white banner with the coat of arms in the center.

=== Royal flags ===
Flag	Date	Use	Description
	1968–1992	Royal Standard of Mauritius	A banner of the coat of arms of Mauritius defaced in the centre with a royal cypher of Queen Elizabeth II.
	1837–1968	Royal Standard of the United Kingdom	A banner of the Queen's Arms, the Royal Coat of Arms of the United Kingdom.
	1816–1837	Royal Standard of the United Kingdom	The Royal Arms after Hanover had become a kingdom.
	1810–1816	Royal Standard of the United Kingdom	A banner of the Royal Arms from the creation of the United Kingdom on 1 January 1801; first and fourth quarters for England and Wales, second Scotland, third Ireland, with an inescutcheon for the Electorate of Hanover.
	1804–1810	Imperial Standard of the First French Empire	A white banner with red and blue borders and an eagle in the center, symbol of Napoleon Bonaparte.
	1715–1792	Royal Standard of the Kingdom of France	A white banner with several fleurs-de-lis with the royal coat of arms in the center.
	1715	Royal Standard of the French King Louis XIV	A white banner with the royal coat of arms in the center.

=== Viceregal flags ===
Flag	Date	Use	Description
	1968–1992	Flag of the governor-general of Mauritius	A dark blue field featuring a St. Edward's Crown surmounted by a crowned lion, over the word "MAURITIUS" on a yellow scroll.
	1906–1968	Flag of the governor of Mauritius	A Union Jack defaced in the centre with the coat of arms of Mauritius on a white disc surrounded by a laurel wreath.
	1869–1906	Flag of the governor of Mauritius	A Union Jack defaced in the centre with the 1869 arms of Mauritius on a white disc surrounded by a laurel wreath.
