= List of Eritrean flags =

This is a list of flags used in Eritrea. For more information about the national flag, visit the article Flag of Eritrea.

== National flag ==
Flag	Date	Use	Description
	1995–present	National flag and ensign of Eritrea	A red isosceles triangle based on the hoist-side pointed toward the fly-side and dividing the field into two right triangles: the upper triangle is green and the lower triangle is blue. In the red triangle near the hoist is a vertical olive branch encircled by an olive wreath, all in yellow.

== Governmental flag ==
Flag	Date	Use	Description
	1995–present	Standard of the president of state	A red isosceles triangle based on the hoist-side pointed toward the fly-side and dividing the field into two right triangles: the upper triangle is green and the lower triangle is blue. In the red triangle near the hoist is the Emblem of Eritrea.

== Ethnic groups flags ==
Flag	Date	Use	Description
	?–present	Flag of the Kunama people (used by DMLEK)	A horizontal tricolour of black, red, and white with a flower in the white stripe.
	?–present	Flag of the Saho people (used by SPDM)	A horizontal triband of black (top), white, and black with a five-pointed star in the canton.

== Historical flags ==
Flag	Date	Use	Description
	1270–1875	Flag of the Ethiopian Empire	A horizontal tricolour of yellow, red, and green.
	1530–1543	Flags of the Adal Sultanate	Three flags – white, red, and white – with a crescent moon in each.
	1557–1793	Flag of the Ottoman Empire	
	1793–1844	Flag of the Ottoman Empire	A red field with a white crescent moon and an eight-pointed star.
	1793–1844	Flag of Ottoman Egypt	Red flag with a white crescent and a seven-pointed white star.
	1844–1882	Flag of the Ottoman Empire	A red field with a white crescent moon and a five-pointed star.
	1844–1867	Flag of the self-declared Khedivate of Egypt introduced by Muhammad Ali	Red flag with a white crescent containing a five-pointed white star.
	1867–1881	Flag of the Khedivate of Egypt	Red flag with a white crescent and three five-pointed white stars.
	1875–1881	Flag of the Ethiopian Empire	A horizontal tricolour of red, white, and purple with the Lion of Judah superimposed at the center.
	1881–1882	Flag of the Khedivate of Egypt under British occupation	
	1881–1882	Flag of the Ethiopian Empire	Three triangular pennants of red, yellow, and green.
	1881–1882	Flag used during the Mahdist Revolt and in Mahdist Sudan	A golden field with blue and red borders and blue Arabic script in the center.
	1881–1882	Black standard used in Mahdist Sudan	A simple black field.
	1882–1941	Flag of the Kingdom of Italy (Italian Eritrea)	An Italian tricolour – three equally sized vertical bands of green, white, and red – with the Savoy shield and Royal crown in the middle.
	1882–1941	Royal Standard of the King of Italy	A blue flag with a crowned eagle and four crowns, one in each corner.
	1938–1941	Flag of the Viceroy and Governor-General Italian East Africa	
	1941–1952	Flag of the United Kingdom (Anglo-Egyptian Sudan)	A superimposition of the flags of England and Scotland with the Saint Patrick's Saltire (representing Ireland).
	1941–1952	The royal standard of the United Kingdom	A banner of the King's Arms, the Royal Coat of Arms of the United Kingdom.
	1941–1952	Flag of the Kingdom of Egypt (Anglo-Egyptian Sudan)	Green field with a white crescent containing three white five-pointed stars.
	1941–1952	Standard of the King of Egypt	Identical to the national flag of the Kingdom of Egypt, with the royal crown added in the upper-hoist corner.
	1952–1962	Flag of Eritrea within the Federation of Ethiopia and Eritrea	A light blue field with a green vertical olive branch encircled by an olive wreath in the center.
	1952–1974	Flag of the Ethiopian Empire	A horizontal tricolour of green, yellow and red with the Lion of Judah superimposed at the center.
	1952–1974	Imperial standard of Ethiopia (obverse)	A horizontal tricolour of green, yellow, and red with the Lion of Judah superimposed at the center with five six-pointed stars.
	1952–1974	Imperial standard of Ethiopia (reverse)	A horizontal tricolour of green, yellow, and red with the figure of Saint George and the Dragon superimposed at the center with five six-pointed stars.
	1974–1975	Flag of the Derg	A horizontal tricolour of green, yellow, and red with the Lion of Judah superimposed at the center (without the crown and with a spear).
	1975–1987	Flag of the Derg	A horizontal tricolour of green, yellow, and red with the Ethiopian Emblem superimposed at the center.
	1987–1991	Flag of the People's Democratic Republic of Ethiopia	A horizontal tricolour of green, yellow, and red with the Ethiopian Emblem superimposed at the center.
	1991–1993	Flag of the Transitional Government of Ethiopia	A horizontal tricolour of green, yellow, and red with the Ethiopian Emblem superimposed at the center.
	1961–1991	Flag of the EPLF	A red isosceles triangle based on the hoist-side pointed toward the fly-side and dividing the field into two right triangles: the upper triangle is green and the lower triangle is blue. In the red triangle near the hoist is a golden five-pointed star.
	1993–1995	Flag of Eritrea	A red isosceles triangle based on the hoist-side pointed toward the fly-side and dividing the field into two right triangles: the upper triangle is green and the lower triangle is blue. In the red triangle near the hoist is a vertical olive branch encircled by an olive wreath, all in yellow.

== See also ==
- Emblem of Eritrea
- Flag of Eritrea
