= List of Djibouti flags =

The following is a list of flags used in Djibouti. For more information about the national flag, see Flag of Djibouti.

== National flag ==
Flag	Date	Use	Description
	1977–present	Flag of Djibouti	A horizontal bicolour of light blue and light green, with a white triangle at the hoist bearing a red star in its center.

== Military flag ==
Flag	Date	Use	Description
	1977–present	Naval jack of Djibouti	A diagonal tricolour of blue, white, and green.

== Political party flags ==
Flag	Date	Use	Description
	1960–1977	Flag of the Front de Libération de la Côte des Somalis	
	1972–1977	Flag of the African People's League for Independence	Similar to the national flag.
	1960–1972	Flag of the Djibouti Liberation Movement	A green field with two white stripes and a red isosceles triangle at the hoist bearing a golden star in its center.
	1972–1977	Flag of the Djibouti Liberation Movement	A green field with two white stripes, two light blue stripes and a red isosceles triangle at the hoist bearing a crescent moon in its center.
	2003–present	Flag of the Union for the Presidential Majority	A yellow field with the UMP emblem in the center.
	1960–1994	Flag of the National Union for Independence	A horizontal bicolour of green and black, with a red isosceles triangle at the hoist bearing a sword and a hammer in its center.
	1991–present	Flag of the Front for the Restoration of Unity and Democracy	A white isosceles triangle based on the hoist-side pointed toward the fly-side and dividing the rest of the flag into two right triangles: the upper triangle is blue and the lower triangle is green. A red five-pointed star is centered on the hoist side of the white triangle.

== Historical flags ==
Flag	Date	Use	Description
	1415–1577	Flag of the Adal Sultanate (note: fictional recreation)	Three flags: two white with a red crescent moon, one red with a white crescent moon
	1543–1577	Flag of the Ethiopian Empire (note: fictional recreation)	Three pennants arranged in a horizontal tricolour of yellow, red, and green.
	1577–1793	Flag of the Ottoman Empire (note: fictional recreation)	
	1793–1844	Flag of the Ottoman Empire	A red field with a white crescent moon and an eight-pointed star.
	1844–1883	Flag of the Ottoman Empire	A red field with a white crescent moon and a five-pointed star.
	1874–1881	Flag of the Khedivate of Egypt	Red flag with a white crescent and three white five-pointed stars.
	1881–1883	Flag of the Khedivate of Egypt under British occupation	A red field with a crescent moon and a six-pointed star.
	1889	Flag of the Russian Empire	A horizontal tricolour of white, blue, and red.
	1896–1940; 1944–1977	Flag of France	A vertical tricolour of blue, white, and red (proportions 3:2).
	1940–1942	Flag of Vichy France	A vertical tricolour of blue, white, and red with an axe and seven golden stars.
	1942–1943	Flag of the United Kingdom	A superimposition of the flags of England and Scotland with the Saint Patrick's Saltire (representing Ireland).
	1943–1944	Flag of Free France	A vertical tricolour of blue, white, and red with the red Cross of Lorraine.

== See also ==
- Flag of Djibouti
- Emblem of Djibouti
