= List of Ugandan flags =

The following is a list of flags and banners used in Uganda.

== National flag ==
Flag	Date	Use	Description
	1962–present	Flag of Uganda	Six equal horizontal bands of black (top), yellow, red, black, yellow, and red (bottom); a white disc is superimposed at the centre and depicts the national symbol, a grey crowned crane, facing the hoist side.

== Government flag ==
Flag	Date	Use	Description
	1962–present	Presidential flag of Uganda	A red field with six very thin horizontal stripes along the bottom – in the colours and order of the flag of Uganda – and the national coat of arms in the center.

== Ethnic group flags ==
Flag	Date	Use	Description
	1993–present	Flag of the Nkole people	The flag of the Ankole kingdom
	1994–present	Flag of the Nyoro people	The flag of the Bunyoro kingdom
	1962–present	Flag of the Soga people	
	1962–present	Flag of the Acholi people	
	1962–present	Flag of the Lango people	
	1962–present	Flag of the Rwenzururu people	
	1962–present	Flag of the Toro people	

== Political flags ==
=== Political parties ===
Flag	Date	Use	Description
	c.2003–present	Flag of the Democratic Party	A horizontal bicolour of white and green.
	c.2011–present	Flag of the National Resistance Movement	Five horizontal stripes of yellow (top), blue, green, red, and yellow (bottom), with the top and bottom stripes three times as a wide as the others. A white disc is superimposed at the centre and depicts the party's symbol, a yellow bus.
	1960–1966	Flag of the Uganda People's Congress	A horizontal tricolour of black, yellow, and red.
	1966–present	Flag of the Uganda People's Congress	A horizontal tricolour of black, red, and blue.

=== Rebel groups ===
Flag	Date	Use	Description
	1996–present	Flag of the Allied Democratic Forces	A horizontal tricolour of blue, white, and red with a green isosceles triangle based on the hoist side and the letters ADM/A written in blue on the white band.

== Military flags ==
Flag	Date	Use	Description
	2019–present	Flag of the Uganda People's Defence Force	
	1962–2019	Flag of the Uganda People's Defence Force	A green field with six very thin horizontal stripes along the bottom – in the colours and order of the flag of Uganda – and the UPDF's emblem in the center.
	2019–present	Flag of the Ugandan Land Forces	
	1964–present	Flag of the Uganda Air Force	A cyan field with six very thin horizontal stripes along the bottom – in the colours and order of the flag of Uganda – and the Air Force's emblem in the center.

== Subdivision flags ==
=== Traditional kingdoms ===
Ankole

Buganda

Bunyoro

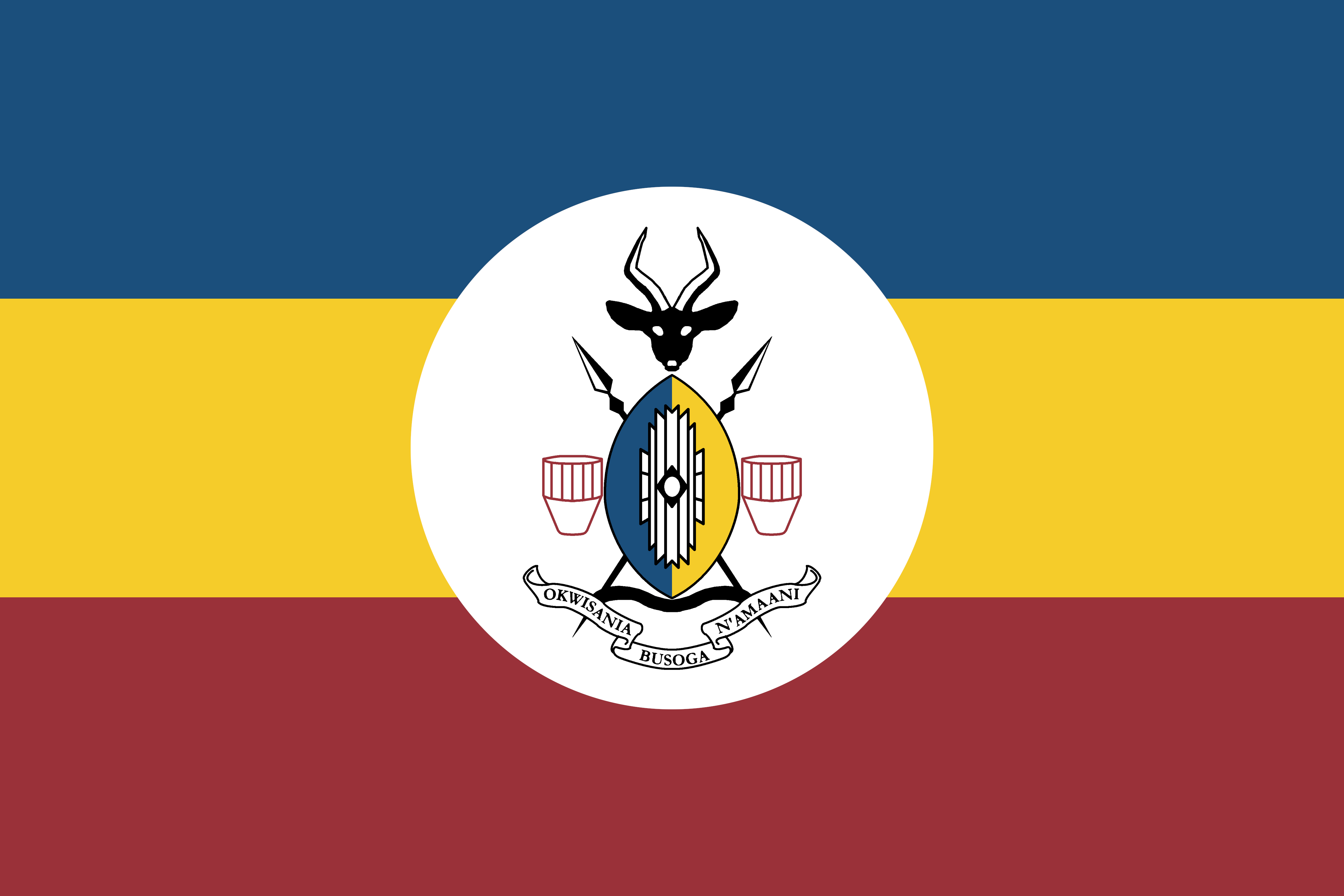
Busoga

Tooro

=== Historical flags ===
Buganda (1860)

Buganda (1861–1876, 1881–1890)

Buganda (1876–1881)

Buganda (1891–1892)

Buganda (1892)

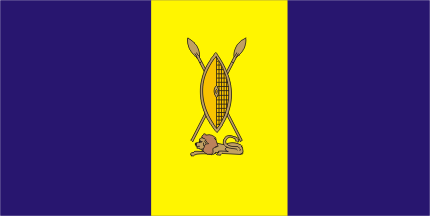
Buganda (1900)

== Historical flags ==
=== Kingdom of Buganda ===
Flag	Date	Use	Description
	1860–1861	Flag of the Kingdom of Buganda	A simple red field.
	1861–1876	Flag of the Kingdom of Buganda	A red field with a white vertical band at the hoist.
	1881–1890	Flag of the Kingdom of Buganda	A red field with a white vertical band at the hoist.
	1876–1881	Flag of the Kingdom of Buganda	A white swallowtailed flag with two vertical stripes of red and blue.

=== British Empire ===
Flag	Date	Use	Description
	1890–1962	Flag of the United Kingdom	A superimposition of the flags of England and Scotland with the Saint Patrick's Saltire (representing Ireland).
	1890–1894	Flag of the Imperial British East Africa Company	British Blue Ensign with a crown and beneath it the golden sun.
	1890–1894	Governor's flag of the Imperial British East Africa Company	A Union Flag defaced with a crown and beneath it the golden sun.
	1914–1962	Flag of the Protectorate of Uganda	British Blue Ensign with the emblem of Uganda.
	1914–1962	Governor's flag of the Protectorate of Uganda	A Union Flag defaced with the emblem of Uganda.
	1962	Flag of the Dominion of Uganda (provisional)	Vertical outer bands of green, a central blue band, and narrow yellow bands between the green and blue. On the blue band, a yellow grey crowned crane facing the hoist side.

== See also ==
- Flag of Uganda
- Coat of arms of Uganda
