= List of Beninese flags =

The following is a list of flags and banners used in Benin.

== National flag ==
Flag	Date	Use	Description
	1990–present	Flag of Benin	A horizontal bicolour of yellow and red with a green vertical band at the hoist.
	1990–present	Flag of Benin (vertical)	

== Ethnic flag ==
Flag	Date	Use	Description
	?–present	Flag of the Yoruba people	The Yoruba or Oduduwa flag consists of a blue-white-green diagonal tricolor band representing the sea, the sky/peace and the land respectively. Sixteen six-pointed golden stars said to represent the original sixteen clans/settlements/progenies that emerged from Ife in Yoruba ethnic lore and signifying illumination/progress are arranged in a circular pattern at the centre. Two thinner diagonal red strips representing sacrifice and struggle are placed within the middle band section. A red central laurel representing nobility and sacrifice envelopes a central head representing Oduduwa or Olokun, central figures in Yoruba origin legends, which symbolizes common cultural origins and a shared destiny.

== Municipality flags ==
Flag	Date	Use	Description
	?–present	Flag of Cotonou	A vertical bicolor of blue and yellow with a mermaid in the center.
	?–present	Flag of Porto-Novo	A white field with the arms of the municipality in the center.

== Political flag ==
Flag	Date	Use	Description
	1975–1990	Flag of the PRPB	A red field charged with a five-pointed yellow star in the upper hoist.

== Military flags ==
Flag	Date	Use	Description
	1960–present	Flag of the Benin Armed Forces (obverse)	A horizontal bicolour of yellow and red with a green vertical band at the hoist with the name of the armed forces at the top and bottom and a golden fringe.
	1960–present	Flag of the Benin Armed Forces (reverse)	Reversed version of the previous flag, except with unreversed text.
	1990–present	Flag of the Republican Police (obverse)	A horizontal bicolour of yellow and red with a green vertical band at the hoist with the name of the police force at the top and bottom, the emblem in the center and a golden fringe.
	1990–present	Flag of the Republican Police (reverse)	Reversed version of the previous flag, except with unreversed text.

== Historical flags ==
Flag	Date	Use	Description
	1730–1816	Royal flag until the late 18th century (used only in fortresses and warships of the Crown) and national flag from then on	White with the coat of arms of the Kingdom in the middle.
	1750–1816	Variant of the royal flag until the late 18th century (used only in fortresses and warships of the Crown) and national flag from then on	White with the coat of arms of the Kingdom in the middle (variant with a heraldic console encircling the shield).
	1816–1818	Flag of Portugal	White with the coat of arms of the Kingdom in the middle (coat of arms of the United Kingdom of Portugal, Brazil and the Algarves)
	1818–1859	The Royal flag of King Ghezo of the Kingdom of Dahomey.	A white field with a red border and an elephant in the center.
	1859–1890	No flag	King Glele was not known to have used any royal flags or banners.
	1890–1894	The royal banner of King Behanzin of the Kingdom of Dahomey.	A light blue field with the coat of arms in the center.
	1894–1959	Flag of France (used in French Dahomey)	A vertical tricolor of blue, white, and red.
	1942–1944	Flag of Free France (used in French Dahomey)	A vertical tricolor of blue, white, and red with the Cross of Lorraine in the center.
	1959–1975	Flag of the Republic of Dahomey	Introduced on November 16, 1959, after Dahomey was granted semi-autonomous status within the French Community.
	1975–1990	Flag of the People's Republic of Benin	A green field charged with a five-pointed red star in the upper hoist.
