= List of Moroccan flags =

This is a list of flags used in Morocco. For more information about the national flag, visit the article Flag of Morocco.

== National flags ==
Flag	Date	Use	Description
	1915–present	National flag and state ensign	A red field with a green pentagram, the five-pointed "Seal of Solomon".
	1915–present	Civil ensign	A red field with a green interlaced pentagram; in the canton, a yellow one-starred crown.
	1915–present	Naval ensign	A red field with a interlaced pentagram; a yellow one-starred crown is in each corner.
	1915–present	Naval jack	A red swallowtailed field with a yellow border and a green yellow-bordered interlaced pentagram.
	1915–present	Royal flag	A red field with a green yellow-bordered interlaced pentagram.

== Royal standard ==
Flag	Date	Use	Description
	1915–present	Royal standard	A green field with the national coat of arms in the center.

== Military flags ==
Flag	Date	Use	Description
	1956–present	Armed Forces	A red field with a border of golden leaves, a green yellow-bordered pentagram, and yellow Arabic script in three corners.
	1956–present	Ground Force	A red field with a border of golden leaves and the army's emblem in the center.
	1960–present	Naval Force	A light blue field with a border of golden leaves and the navy's emblem in the center.
	1956–present	Air Force	A blue field with a border of golden leaves and the air force's emblem in the center.
	1957–present	Gendarmerie	A black field with a border of golden leaves and the gendarmerie's emblem in the center.
	1956–present	Royal Guard	A green field with a yellow pentagram, and a smaller pentagram in each corner.

=== Alawi Sultanate ===
Flag	Date	Use	Description
	1666–1915	Flag of the Alawi Sultanate	A plain red field.

=== French Morocco ===
Flag	Date	Use	Description
	1915–1919	Merchant flag of Morocco under the French protectorate	A red field with a green pentagram.
	1940–1945	Merchant flag of Morocco under the French protectorate	A red field with a green pentagram.
	1919–1940	Merchant flag of Morocco under the French protectorate	A red field with a green pentagram and a small French tricolor in the upper hoist canton.
	1945–1956	Merchant flag of Morocco under the French protectorate	A red field with a green pentagram and a small French tricolor in the upper hoist canton.

=== Spanish Morocco ===
Flag	Date	Use	Description
	1912–1937	Merchant flag of Morocco under the Spanish protectorate	A simple red field.
	1937–1956	Merchant flag of Morocco under the Spanish protectorate	A red field with a green canton containing a white pentagram.

=== Republic of the Rif ===
Flag	Date	Use	Description
	1921–1926	Flag of the Republic of the Rif	A red field centered with a white diamond and a green crescent moon and a six-pointed star inside the diamond.

=== Tangier International Zone ===
Flag	Date	Use	Description
	1924–1940	Flag of International Tangier	A red field with the emblem of Tangier on the hoist side and a green pentagram on the fly side.
	1945–1956	Flag of International Tangier	A red field with the emblem of Tangier on the hoist side and a green pentagram on the fly side.

== Regional flags ==
Flag	Date	Use	Description
	?–present	Flag of Sidi Bennour Province	
	1976–1997	Flag of Agadir Prefecture	
	1976–1997	Flag of Al Hoceïma Province	
	?–present	Flag of Marrakesh Province	
	1976–1997	Flag of Azilal Province	
	?–present	Flag of Tan Tan Province	
	1976–1997	Flag of Dakhla Province	

== Misattributed flags ==
Flag	Date	Use	Description
	1924	Inaccurate flag of Morocco as shown in Nouveau Petit Larousse Illustré, 1924	A red field with the Seal of Solomon.
