= List of Algerian flags =

The following is a list of flags and banners related with Algeria.

== National flag ==
Flag	Date	Use	Description
	1962–present	National flag, civil and state ensign	A vertical bicolor of green and white with a red crescent encircling a red five-pointed star centered along the dividing line.
	1962–present	National flag (vertical)	A vertical bicolor of green and white with a red crescent encircling a red five-pointed star centered along the dividing line.

== Standards of the head of state ==
Flag	Date	Use	Description
current
	1962–present	Presidential flag of Algeria	A vertical bicolor of green and white with a red crescent encircling a red five-pointed star centered along the dividing line with Arabic scripts written in gold above ("Democratic People's Algerian Republic") and below ("by the People for the People"), or downwards along the hoist "Algeria"
former
	?–1837	Flag of the Bey of Constantine	A red flag with a white drawing of the Zulfiqar sword.
	18th century	Flag of the Dey of Algiers	A solid red flag.

== Military flags ==
=== Land Force ===
Flag	Date	Use	Description
former
	1516–1830	Land forces flags (Odjak of Algiers)	During the conquest, the French captured about 100 with varying numbers of red and yellow stripes.

=== Naval Force ===
Flag	Date	Use	Description
current
	2004–present	Naval ensign of Algeria	A vertical bicolor of green and white with a red crescent encircling a red five-pointed star centered along the dividing line and white crossed fouled anchors in the canton.
	2004–present	Naval jack of Algeria	The national flag in the canton on a light blue field.
former
	1987–2004	Naval ensign of Algeria	A vertical bicolor of green and white with a red crescent encircling a red five-pointed star centered along the dividing line and red crossed fouled anchors in the canton.
	1987–2004	Rank flag of the Commander of the Naval Forces	
	1987–2004	Rank flag of the Chief of Staff of the Naval Forces	A blue swallowtail flag with a yellow anchor in the center and two red ones in the canton.
	1987–2004	Rank flag of a flag officer of the Naval Forces	A blue swallowtail flag with a white anchor in the center and two red ones in the canton.
	16th – 18th century	Flag of the official in charge of the fleet.	A blue flag with an arm holding a sword.
	16th – early 19th century	Naval flag seen on Algerian ships, including privateers.	Two color versions of the red flag with berberian head in the canton.
	18th – early 19th century	Naval flag seen on Algerian ships, including privateers.	A red flag with a yellow stripe with a red crescent.

== Historical flags ==
Flag	Date	Use	Description
former
	1235–1556	Flag of the Kingdom of Tlemcen according to the Portolan chart	A deep blue crescent (symbolizing maritime and Mediterranean connections).
	1832–1847	Flag of the Emirate of Abdelkader	A raised Hand of Fatima (khamsa) drawn in the white center.
	1847–1962	Flag of French Algeria	The standard French national flag featuring three vertical bands of equal width: blue (hoist side), white, and red.

== Merchant flag ==
Flag	Date	Use	Description
former
	After 1848 – 1910	Merchant flag of French Algeria	The flag consists of seven horizontal stripes, three white, two blue and two red. The colors are identical to the French national flag, and the form resembles flags from the Regency times The exact rules and years of use of this flag are unknown.
	16th – 18th century	One of the types of merchant flags of the Regency of Algiers	The flag consists of five horizontal stripes – two blue, two red, and one green.
	16th – 18th century	One of the types of merchant flags of the Regency of Algiers	The flag consists of five horizontal stripes – two red, two yellow, and one green.
	16th – 18th century	One of the types of merchant flags of the Regency of Algiers	A horizontal bicolor of white above black.

== Proposed flags ==
Flag	Date	Use	Description
	1962	Flag proposed during ceasefire talks between FLN and OAS representatives in Algiers during Summer 1962.	A vertical bicolor of green and white with a red crescent encircling a red five-pointed star centered along the dividing line, with the French tricolour on the hoist side "in the manner of the Commonwealth countries, Canada or Australia".

== Political flags ==
Flag	Date	Party	Description
current
	1953–present	Party of Liberation	The flag consists of the Black Standard with a white text of the Shahada emblazoned across it in calligraphy style writing.
	1954–present	National Liberation Front	Similar to the flag of Algeria.
former
	1989–1992	Islamic Salvation Front	Red flag with white logo of the ISF, with the groups name in Arabic (الجبهة الإسلامية للإنقاذ) across it. The writing in the box above the logo is from Surah 'Ali `Imran [3:103] of the Quran. (وكنتم على شفا حفرة من النار فأنقذكم منها). Writing at the bottom of the logo reads الجبهة الإسلامية الموحدة (en: United Islamic Front).
	1947–1966	Ba'ath Party	Main article: Flag of the Ba'ath Party
	1920–1962	Algerian Communist Party	A red flag with a white hammer and sickle and the slogan "Pain, Paix, Liberté" (en: Bread, Peace, Liberty).

== Misattributed flags ==
Flag	Date	Party	Description
	?	Alleged personal standard of Emir Abdelkader.	The flag was considered to be the emir's personal banner in the French Army Museum, but it may have been confused with Samori Ture.
	19th century	Erroneous flag of French Algeria	A blue flag with the French tricolor in the canton. Some sources suggest its use in the Algiers Pavilion at the Exposition Universelle in Paris in 1900, but this is not certain.
	17th century	The banner of the Dey of Algiers according to the erroneous description of a 17th century French traveler.	A green flag with a yellow crescent.

== See also ==
- Flag of Algeria
- Emblem of Algeria
