= Coat of arms of Seychelles =

Coat of arms of the Republic of Seychelles

Versions
- 1976–1996
- Armiger: Republic of Seychelles
- Adopted: 27 May 1976, 18 June 1996
- Crest: Above water barry wavy Azure and Argent a White Tailed Tropic Bird (Phaeton lepturus lepturus) volant proper.
- Torse: Azure, Or, Gules, Argent and Vert
- Shield: Azure, a Female Sea coconut palm (Lodoicea maldivica) issuant from the base a grassy mount thereon a Giant Tortoise (Testudo gigantea) the whole in front of water rising therefrom to the dexter an Island and sailing thereon a two-masted Schooner in full sail all proper.
- Supporters: On either side a Sail Fish (Istiophorus gladius) proper
- Motto: FINIS CORONAT OPUS "The End Crowns the Work"

The coat of arms of the Republic of Seychelles shows a shield, in which a giant tortoise is located on green grounds. On the ground there is a coco de mer palm tree. Behind it there is a blue sea with two islands and a sail ship to be seen. The shield is enthroned by a silver helmet, on which a white-tailed tropicbird is located above blue and white waves. The shield is supported by two white sailfish. Beneath the shield the motto of Seychelles is stated: "Finis Coronat Opus" (a phrase traditionally attributed to Ovid) (Latin for "The End Crowns the Work").

== History ==
=== First coat of arms ===
After the separation of Seychelles from the Mauritius in 1903, a new badge for Seychelles was adopted. The new badge was designed by Major-General Charles George Gordon. The badge consisted of a disc with a picture of the coast of Mahé with a Coco de mer on the shore, some shrubs and a giant Tortoise . On a listel in the base is the motto Finis Coronat Opvs.

=== Second coat of arms ===
The second coat of arms was embellished and augmented in 1961. The coat of arms was designed by Mrs. Alec McEwen of Toronto. On the coat of arms, a second island was added, symbolizing the other 114 islands of the archipelago. In the ocean, a schooner symbolizes the traffic between the islands. Around the badge is a bordure with stylized waves and the title and the motto of the colony.

== Current coat of arms ==
=== First variant ===
The current coat of arms was given by the Royal Warrant of Queen Elizabeth II, dated 27 May 1976.

=== Second variant ===
On 18 June 1996, by the National Symbols Act of 1996, the colour of the coat of arms were changed to a brighter color. The most significant change was the change of the torse on the helmet, from white-blue-red (based on the older Seychellois flag), to blue-yellow-red-white-green (the color of the current flag of Seychelles).

=== Current official description ===
The coat of arms of Seychelles is officially described as follows:

ARMS: Azure a Female Coco de Mer Palm (Lodoicea maldivica) issuant from in base a grassy mount thereon a Giant Tortoise (Testudo gigantea) the whole in front of water rising therefrom to the dexter an Island and sailing thereon a two-masted Schooner in full sail all proper.

CREST: Upon a Wreath Azure, Or, Gules and Vert above water barry wavy Azure and Argent a White Tailed Tropic Bird (Phaethon lepturus lepturus) volant proper.

SUPPORTERS: On either side a Sail Fish (Istiophorus gladius) proper.

MOTTO: FINIS CORONAT OPUS

== Gallery ==
1903–1961

1961–1976

1976–1996

Current version
