= Flag of Grande Comore =

Flag

Ngazidja
- Proportion: 2:3
- Adopted: 2002; 24 years ago
- Design: A navy blue field with a white crescent moon and four white stars in the hoist side.

The flag of Grande Comore was adopted in 2002. It is a navy blue field with a white crescent moon and four white stars in the hoist side.

== Historical flag ==
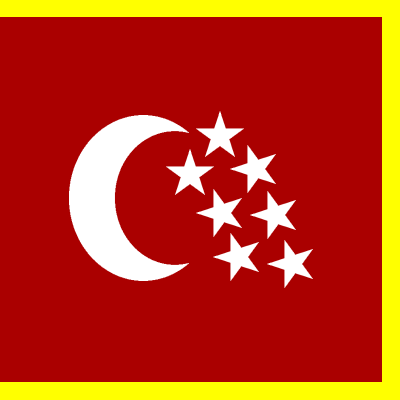

Only one other flag is known to have been used historically on the island, it was the sultan's personal flag used from the unification of the island to the French annexation. According to Lucien Philippe, the standard of the sultan was a crimson square flag with a golden fringe and seven stars representing the seven Sultanates unified into one. The pattern of the stars resembled a map of the islands.
