= Flag of Mohéli =

Flag

Mohéli
- Proportion: 2:3
- Adopted: 2003; 23 years ago
- Design: A large red five-pointed star centered on a yellow field.

The flag of Mohéli is a yellow field with a red star. It was adopted in 2003. It replaced the previous flag, which was adopted when Mohéli became an autonomous island in 2002.

Mohéli separatists formerly flew plain a red flag with a yellow hoist, based on the flag used during the reign of Sultan Jumbe Fatima bint Abderremane in the 19th century.

== Historical flags ==
Flag of the Mwali Sultanate (1830–1868)

Flag of the Mwali Sultanate (1868–1871)

Flag of the Mwali Sultanate (1871–1886)

Flag of the Mwali Sultanate (1886–1891)

Flag of the Mwali Sultanate (1891–1904)

Flag of Queen Djoumbé Fatima (1842–1867), Separatist flag (1997–1998)

Official flag (2002–2003)
