= Historical flags of the British Empire and the overseas territories =

British Empire
- Left: Flag of Great Britain (before 1801); Right: Flag of the United Kingdom

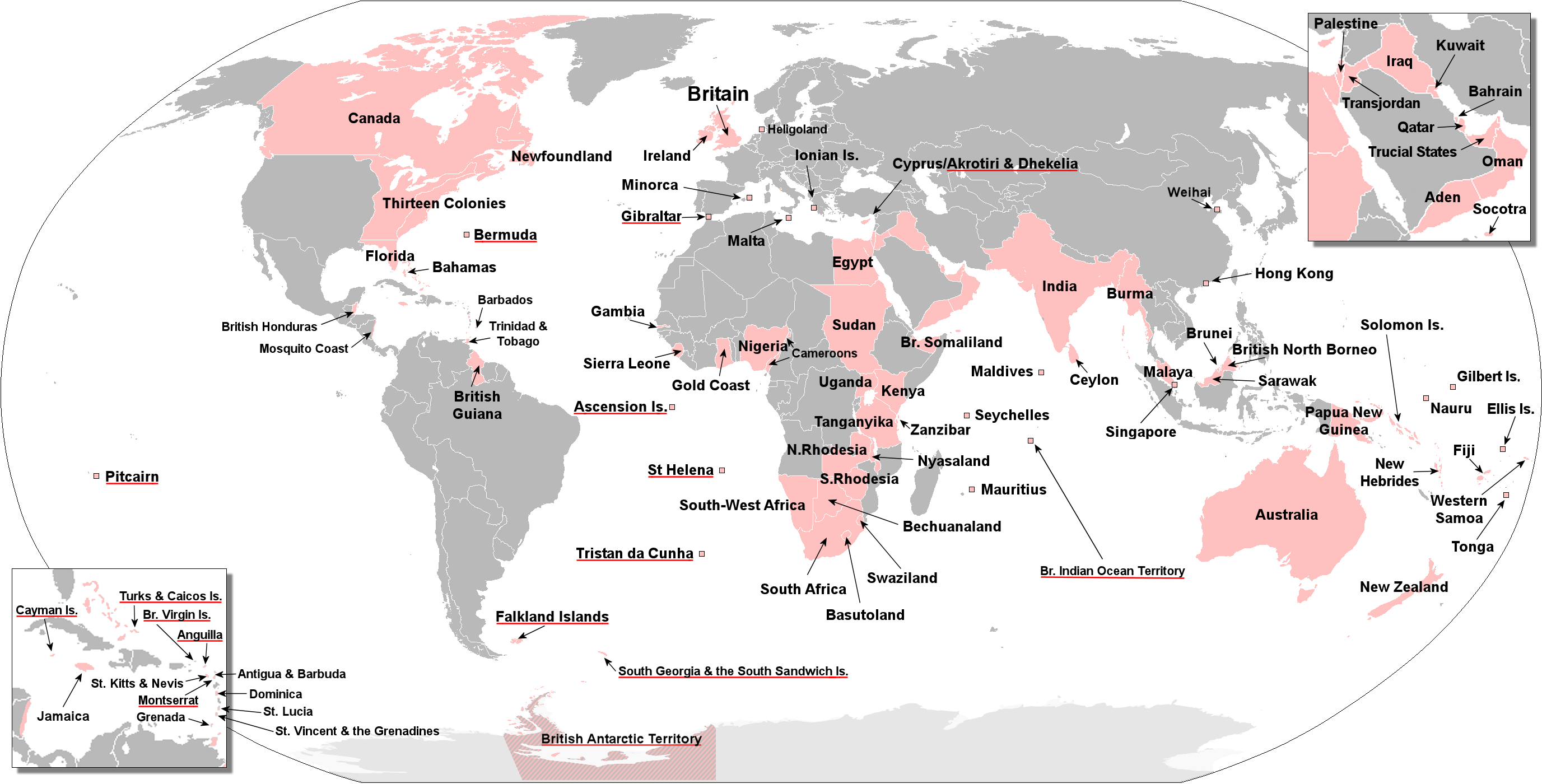
- Flags were used to represent a variety of territories colonies, and Dominions across the British Empire

The historical flags of the British Empire and the overseas territories refers to the various flags that were used across the various Dominions, Crown colonies, protectorates, and territories which made up the British Empire and overseas territories. Early flags that were used across the Empire (including the then Thirteen Colonies which later became the United States of America) tended to be variations of the Red and Blue Ensigns of Great Britain with no colonial badges or coat of arms attached to them. In the first half of the 19th century, the first colonies started to acquire their own colony badges, but it was not until the UK Parliament passed the Colonial Naval Defence Act 1865 that the colonies were required to apply their own emblems.

The following list contains all former and current flags that have been used across the Empire and as well as British overseas territories.

== Historical flags of the British Empire and the overseas territories ==
=== Aden ===
Flag	Date	Use	Description
	1937–1963	Aden	A Blue Ensign defaced with an Arab ship inside a disc

=== Akrotiri and Dhekelia ===
Flag	Date	Use	Description
	1960–	Akrotiri and Dhekelia	The Sovereign Base Areas of Akrotiri and Dhekelia have never had their own official flag, and instead use the Union Jack for all official purposes.

=== Anguilla ===
Flag	Date	Use	Description
	1967	Anguilla	A red flag featuring the name of the island in yellow and two mermaids inside a blue oval.
	1967–1969	Anguilla	The 1967–1969 independence flag and is still widely seen and used on the island as an unofficial flag to this day.
	1990–1999	Anguilla	A defaced Blue Ensign with the coat of arms of Anguilla in the fly.
	1999–	Anguilla	A defaced Blue Ensign with the coat of arms of Anguilla in the fly. Still currently used as the flag for the island.

=== Antigua and Barbuda ===
Flag	Date	Use	Description
	1956–1962	Antigua and Barbuda	A Blue Ensign defaced with the colonial coat of arms of Antigua on a white disc.
	1962–1967	Antigua and Barbuda	A Blue Ensign defaced with the colonial coat of arms of Antigua.
	1967–1981	Antigua and Barbuda	This flag was adopted in 1967, to mark Antigua and Barbuda gaining Associated State status with the United Kingdom, and remained in use after full independence in 1981.
	1981–Present	Antigua and Barbuda	This flag was adopted in 1967, to mark Antigua and Barbuda gaining Associated State status with the United Kingdom, and remained in use after full independence in 1981.

=== Australia ===
- Note: Australia formally became a country independent from the United Kingdom under the Statute of Westminster Adoption Act 1942 which formally adopted the Statute of Westminster 1931 and backdated the adoption to 3 September 1939.

Flag	Date	Use	Description
	1901–1903	Australia	The original 1901 Federal Flag Design Competition winner. A Blue Ensign defaced with the Commonwealth Star (with 6 points) in the lower hoist quarter and the five stars of the Southern Cross in the fly half (each star had a varying number of points: 9, 8, 7, 6 and 5).
	1901–1903	Australia (Civil Ensign)	A Red Ensign defaced with the Commonwealth Star (with 6 points) in the lower hoist quarter and the five stars of the Southern Cross in the fly half (each star had a varying number of points: 9, 8, 7, and 6).
	1903–1908	Australia	A Blue Ensign defaced with the Commonwealth Star (with 6 points) in the lower hoist quarter and the five stars of the Southern Cross in the fly half (all stars had seven points, except the smallest star only had 5 points) as approved by King Edward VII.
	1903–1908	Australia (Civil Ensign)	A Red Ensign defaced with the Commonwealth Star (with 6 points) in the lower hoist quarter and the five stars of the Southern Cross in the fly half (all stars had seven points).
	1908–	Australia	A Blue Ensign defaced with the seven-point Commonwealth Star in the lower hoist quarter and the five stars of the Southern Cross in the fly half. Still currently used as the national flag of Australia.
	1908–	Australia (Civil Ensign)	Based on the British Civil Air Ensign, with the addition of the Southern Cross and Commonwealth Star in white. Still currently used as the civil ensign of Australia.

==== Australian States ====
Flag	Date	Use	Description
	1876–	State of New South Wales	A St George's Cross with four gold stars and a lion in the fly of a Blue Ensign.
	1901–1963	State of Queensland	A light blue Maltese cross with a Tudor crown on a white background in the fly of a Blue Ensign. In 1963 the Tudor Crown was replaced with the St Edward's Crown.
	1876–1904	State of South Australia	A Blue Ensign with a round disc in the fly displaying Brittania and an Aboriginal Australian man on a beach beside a cliff face with a kangaroo carving.
	1904–	State of South Australia	A piping shrike on a gold background in the fly of a Blue Ensign.
	1901–	State of Tasmania	A red lion on a white background in the fly of a Blue Ensign.
	1901–1953	State of Victoria	The Southern Cross surmounted by a Tudor crown in the fly of a Blue Ensign. In 1953 the Tudor Crown was replaced with the St Edward's Crown.
	1870–1953	State of Western Australia	A black swan on a gold background in the fly of a Blue Ensign. In 1953 the swan was changed to face the opposite direction.

=== Bahama Islands ===
Flag	Date	Use	Description
	1869–1904	Bahama Islands	A Blue Ensign defaced with the badge of the Bahama Islands in a white disc.
	1869–1904	Bahama Islands (Civil Ensign)	A Red Ensign defaced with the badge of the Bahama Islands in a white disc.
	1904–1923	Bahama Islands	A Blue Ensign defaced with the badge of the Bahama Islands in a white disc.
	1904–1923	Bahama Islands (Civil Ensign)	A Red Ensign defaced with the badge of the Bahama Islands in a white disc.
	1923–1953	Bahama Islands	A Blue Ensign defaced with the badge of the Bahama Islands.
	1923–1953	Bahama Islands (Civil Ensign)	A Red Ensign defaced with the badge of the Bahama Islands.
	1953–1964	Bahama Islands	A Blue Ensign defaced with the badge of the Bahama Islands.
	1953–1964	Bahama Islands (Civil Ensign)	A Red Ensign defaced with the badge of the Bahama Islands.
	1964–1973	Bahama Islands	A Blue Ensign defaced with the badge of the Bahama Islands.
	1964–1973	Bahama Islands (Civil Ensign)	A Red Ensign defaced with the badge of the Bahama Islands.

=== Bahrain ===
Flag	Date	Use	Description
	1820–1932	Bahrain Protectorate	A plain red with a white bar at the hoist.
	1932–1972	Bahrain Protectorate	A white band on the left, separated from a red area on the right by twenty-eight triangles that serve as a serrated line.

=== Barbados ===
Flag	Date	Use	Description
	1870–1966	Barbados	A Blue Ensign with the emblem of Barbados.
	1870–1966	Barbados (Civil Ensign)	A Red Ensign with the emblem of Barbados.

=== Basutoland ===
Flag	Date	Use	Description
	1822–1966	Basutoland	Flag of the United Kingdom.
	1951–1966	Basutoland (Unofficial)	A Blue Ensign with the arms of Basutoland in a white disc.

=== Bechuanaland Protectorate ===
Flag	Date	Use	Description
	1885–1966	Bechuanaland Protectorate	Flag of the United Kingdom.

=== Bermuda ===
Flag	Date	Use	Description
	1875–1910	Bermuda	A Blue Ensign defaced with the badge of Bermuda.
	1910–1999	Bermuda	A Red Ensign defaced with the coat of arms of Bermuda.
	1910–1999	Bermuda (Government Ensign)	A Blue Ensign defaced with the coat of arms of Bermuda.

=== British America ===
Flag	Date	Use	Description
	Until 1801 (Canada)	British America, part of what is now Canada and the United States	A Red Ensign with the first version of the Union Jack in the canton (formed as a square). Also known as the Queen Anne Flag and amended to form the Continental Colours of the United States in 1775.
	Until 1776 (US, de facto)	British America, part of what is now Canada and the United States	A Red Ensign with the first version of the Union Jack in the canton (formed as a square). Also known as the Queen Anne Flag and amended to form the Continental Colours of the United States in 1775.
	Until 1783 (US, de jure)	British America, part of what is now Canada and the United States	A Red Ensign with the first version of the Union Jack in the canton (formed as a square). Also known as the Queen Anne Flag and amended to form the Continental Colours of the United States in 1775.

=== British Antarctic Territory ===
Flag	Date	Use	Description
	1963–	British Antarctic Territory	A defaced White Ensign with the coat of arms of the British Antarctic Territory.
	1969–	British Antarctic Territory (Government Ensign)	A defaced Blue Ensign with the coat of arms of the British Antarctic Territory.

=== British Cameroon ===
Flag	Date	Use	Description
	1922–1961	British Cameroons	A Blue Ensign defaced with the words 'British Cameroon' surrounding bananas, all inside a white disc.

=== British Central Africa Protectorate ===
Flag	Date	Use	Description
	1893–1907	British Central Africa Protectorate	A Blue Ensign with an emblem of the British Central Africa Protectorate.

=== British Ceylon ===
Flag	Date	Use	Description
	1875–1948	Ceylon	A Blue Ensign defaced with the coat of arms of Ceylon.
	1875–1948	Ceylon (Civil Ensign)	A Red Ensign defaced with the coat of arms of Ceylon.

=== British Columbia Colony ===
Flag	Date	Use	Description
	1866–1871	British Columbia Colony	A Blue Ensign defaced with the seal of the Colony, all inside a white disc.

=== British East Africa ===
Flag	Date	Use	Description
	1888–1895	British East Africa Company	A Union Jack with the logo of the British East Africa Company in the centre.
	1895–1921	East Africa Protectorate	A Blue Ensign defaced with an emblem of British East Africa.
	1895–1921	East Africa Protectorate (Civil Ensign)	A Red Ensign defaced with an emblem of British East Africa.

=== British Guiana ===
Flag	Date	Use	Description
	1875–1906	British Guiana	A Blue Ensign defaced with the badge of British Guiana.
	1906–1919	British Guiana	A Blue Ensign defaced with the badge of British Guiana inside a white disc.
	1906–1919	British Guiana (Civil Ensign)	A Red Ensign defaced with the badge of British Guiana inside a white disc.
	1919–1954	British Guiana	A Blue Ensign defaced with the badge of British Guiana.
	1919–1954	British Guiana (Civil Ensign)	A Red Ensign defaced with the badge of British Guiana.
	1955–1966	British Guiana	A Blue Ensign defaced with the coat of arms of British Guiana inside a white disc.
	1955–1966	British Guiana (Civil Ensign)	A Red Ensign defaced with the coat of arms of British Guiana inside a white disc.

=== British Hong Kong ===
Flag	Date	Use	Description
	1870–1876	British Hong Kong	A Blue Ensign defaced with the letters HK and a royal crown in a white disc.
	1876–1941	British Hong Kong	A Blue Ensign defaced with the colonial badge of Hong Kong.
	1945–1955	British Hong Kong	A Blue Ensign defaced with the colonial badge of Hong Kong.
	1955–1959	British Hong Kong	A Blue Ensign defaced with the colonial badge of Hong Kong.
	1959–1997	British Hong Kong	A Blue Ensign defaced with the coat of arms of Hong Kong in a white disc.

=== British Honduras ===
Flag	Date	Use	Description
	1870–1919	British Honduras	A Blue Ensign defaced with the badge of British Honduras inside a white disc.
	1870–1919	British Honduras (Civil Ensign)	A Red Ensign defaced with the badge of British Honduras inside a white disc.
	1919–1981	British Honduras	A Blue Ensign defaced with the badge of British Honduras.
	1919–1981	British Honduras (Civil Ensign)	A Red Ensign defaced with the badge of British Honduras.

=== British India ===
Flag	Date	Use	Description
	1733–1801	East India Company	A flag with red and white stripes and the flag of Great Britain in the canton.
	1801–1858	East India Company	A flag with red and white stripes and the flag of the United Kingdom in the canton.
	1858–1947	British India	Flag of the United Kingdom.
	1880–1947	British India (Red Ensign)	A Red Ensign defaced with the Order of the Star of India.
	1885–1947	British India (Standard of the viceroy)	A Union Jack with the Star of India in the center, surmounted by the Tudor Crown. Used at various International events to represent Imperial India.
	1879–1947	British India (Blue Ensign)	A Blue Ensign defaced with the Star of India, used as the naval flag.

=== British Indian Ocean Territory ===
Flag	Date	Use	Description
	1990	British Indian Ocean Territory	A defaced Union Jack with blue wavy stripes with a palm tree with a gold crown on the stump.
	1990	British Indian Ocean Territory	A defaced Union Jack with blue wavy stripes with a palm tree with a gold and red crown on the stump.

=== British Leeward Islands ===
Flag	Date	Use	Description
	1871–1952	British Leeward Islands	A Blue Ensign defaced with the emblem of the British Leeward Islands in the fly.
	1871–1952	British Leeward Islands (Civil Ensign)	A Red Ensign defaced with the emblem of the British Leeward Islands in the fly.
	1952–1958	British Leeward Islands	A Blue Ensign defaced with the emblem of the British Leeward Islands in the fly.
	1952–1958	British Leeward Islands (Civil Ensign)	A Red Ensign defaced with the emblem of the British Leeward Islands in the fly.

=== British New Hebrides ===
Flag	Date	Use	Description
	1906–1952	British New Hebrides	A Blue Ensign defaced with the badge of British New Hebrides.
	1952–1980	British New Hebrides	A Blue Ensign defaced with the badge of British New Hebrides.
	1966–1980	New Hebrides Condominium	The New Hebrides Condominium used several flags that features the flags of both the United Kingdom and France, this version has sky blue field.

=== British Malaya ===
Flag	Date	Use	Description
	1895–1946	Federated Malay States	The flag was striped horizontally with an overall 1:2 to ratio with white stripe at the top, red, yellow and black at the bottom. In the centre was a white oblong, with a horizontal major axis, and a Malayan tiger (Malay: Harimau Malaya) leaping, face to the left.
	1895–1946	Federated Malay States (Civil Ensign)	The flag was striped horizontally with an overall 1:2 to ratio with white stripe at the top, red, yellow and black at the bottom with the Union Jack in the canton.

==== Straits Settlements ====
Flag	Date	Use	Description
	1868–1874	British Straits Settlements	A Blue Ensign defaced with a golden crown at the bottom right hand corner.
	1874–1904	British Straits Settlements	A Blue Ensign defaced with a white disc containing three gold crowns separated by a red inverted pall.
	1874–1904	British Straits Settlements (Civil Ensign)	A Red Ensign defaced with a white disc containing three gold crowns separated by a red inverted pall.
	1904–1925	British Straits Settlements	A Blue Ensign defaced with a white disc containing three gold crowns separated by a red inverted pall.
	1925–1946	British Straits Settlements	A Blue Ensign defaced containing three gold crowns separated by a red inverted pall.
	1904–1946	British Straits Settlements (Civil Ensign)	A Red Ensign defaced with a white disc containing three gold crowns separated by a red inverted pall.

=== British Mauritius ===
Flag	Date	Use	Description
	1869–1906	British Mauritius	A Blue Ensign defaced with the former badge of Mauritius in a white disc.
	1906–1923	British Mauritius	A Blue Ensign defaced with the coat of arms of Mauritius in a white disc.
	1906–1968	British Mauritius (Civil Ensign)	A Red Ensign defaced with the coat of arms of Mauritius in a white disc.
	1923–1968	British Mauritius	A Blue Ensign defaced with the coat of arms of Mauritius.

=== British Nigeria (Northern & Southern) ===
Flag	Date	Use	Description
	1900–1914	Northern Nigeria Protectorate	A Blue Ensign defaced with the badge of the Northern Nigeria Protectorate in a red disc.
	1900–1914	Southern Nigeria Protectorate	A Blue Ensign defaced with the badge of the Southern Nigeria Protectorate in a green disc.
	1914–1952	British Nigeria	A Blue Ensign defaced with a green Star of David surrounding a Tudor Crown with the white word "Nigeria" under it on a red disc.
	1914–1952	British Nigeria (Civil Ensign)	A Red Ensign defaced with a green Star of David surrounding a Tudor Crown with the white word "Nigeria".
	1952–1960	British Nigeria	A Blue Ensign defaced with a green Star of David surrounding a St. Edward's Crown with the white word "Nigeria" under it on a red disc.
	1952–1960	British Nigeria (Civil Ensign)	A Red Ensign defaced with a green Star of David surrounding a St. Edward's Crown with the white word "Nigeria".

=== British Solomon Islands ===
Flag	Date	Use	Description
	1906–1947	British Solomon Islands	A Blue Ensign defaced with the badge of the Solomon Islands.
	1906–1947	British Solomon Islands (Civil Ensign)	A Red Ensign defaced with the badge of the Solomon Islands.
	1947–1956	British Solomon Islands	A Blue Ensign charged with the badge of the Solomon Islands.
	1947–1956	British Solomon Islands (Civil Ensign)	A Red Ensign charged with the badge of the Solomon Islands.
	1956–1966	British Solomon Islands	A Blue Ensign charged with the badge of the Solomon Islands.
	1956–1977	British Solomon Islands (Civil Ensign)	A Red Ensign charged with the badge of the Solomon Islands.
	1966–1977	British Solomon Islands	A Blue Ensign charged with the badge of the Solomon Islands without a white disc.

=== British Somaliland ===
Flag	Date	Use	Description
	1903–1950	British Somaliland	A Blue Ensign defaced with the coat of arms of British Somaliland.
	1903–1950	British Somaliland (Civil Ensign)	A Red Ensign defaced with the coat of arms of British Somaliland.
	1950–1952	British Somaliland	A Blue Ensign defaced with the coat of arms of British Somaliland.
	1950–1952	British Somaliland (Civil Ensign)	A Red Ensign defaced with the coat of arms of British Somaliland.
	1952–1960	British Somaliland	A Blue Ensign defaced with the coat of arms of British Somaliland.
	1952–1960	British Somaliland (Civil Ensign)	A Red Ensign defaced with the coat of arms of British Somaliland.

=== British United Provinces ===
Flag	Date	Use	Description
	1925–1968	British United Provinces	A Blue Ensign defaced with Badge of British United Provinces.

=== British Virgin Islands ===
Flag	Date	Use	Description
	1960–	British Virgin Islands	A Blue Ensign defaced with the coat of arms of the British Virgin Islands.
	1960–	British Virgin Islands (Civil Ensign)	A Red Ensign defaced with the coat of arms of the British Virgin Islands.

=== British West Africa ===
Flag	Date	Use	Description
	1866–1888	British West Africa	A Blue Ensign defaced with the badge of British West Africa Settlements.

=== British Windward Islands ===
Flag	Date	Use	Description
	1886–1903	British Windward Islands	A Blue Ensign defaced with the coat of arms of the British Windward Islands inside a disc.
	1903–1953	British Windward Islands	A Blue Ensign defaced with the coat of arms of the British Windward Islands inside a disc.
	1903–1953	British Windward Islands (Civil Ensign)	A Red Ensign defaced with the coat of arms of the British Windward Islands inside a disc.
	1953–1958	British Windward Islands	A Blue Ensign defaced with the coat of arms of the British Windward Islands inside a disc.
	1953–1958	British Windward Islands (Civil Ensign)	A Red Ensign defaced with the coat of arms of the British Windward Islands inside a disc.

=== Burma ===
Flag	Date	Use	Description
	1939–1941	Colony of Burma	A Blue Ensign defaced with the badge of the Colony of Burma
	1945–1948	Colony of Burma	A Blue Ensign defaced with the badge of the Colony of Burma

=== Brunei ===
Flag	Date	Use	Description
	1906–1959	Brunei	A yellow field cut by black and white diagonal stripes.
	1959–1983	Brunei	Flag of Brunei

=== Canada ===
- Note: Canada formally became an independent country from the United Kingdom under the Statute of Westminster 1931.

Flag	Date	Use	Description
	1707	United Empire Loyalists (British North America)	On April 17, 1707, Queen Anne issued a proclamation regarding the Union Flag's use, which was similar to the earlier version but had slight changes in the fimbriation width. The United Empire Loyalists brought this flag to British North America when they left the United States. In present-day Canada, the flag continues to be used as symbol of pride and heritage for loyalist townships and organizations.
	1867–1965	Canada (national flag)	The Union Jack served as the formal national flag of Canada from Confederation to 1965. However, from the late 19th century to 1965, the civil ensign for Canada, the Canadian Red Ensign, was also used as an unofficial national flag and symbol for Canada.
	1868–1921	Canada (civil ensign and de facto national flag)	A Red Ensign defaced with the coat of arms of the Dominion of Canada.
	1870	Canada (civil ensign variant)	A red ensign defaced with the coat of arms of the Dominion of Canada surrounded by an arc of golden maple leaves.
	1873	Canada (civil ensign variant)	A Red Ensign defaced with the coat of arms of the Dominion of Canada surrounded by an arc of golden maple leaves within a white disc.
	1896	Canada (civil ensign variant)	A Red Ensign defaced with the coat of arms of the Dominion of Canada surrounded by an arc of golden maple leaves within a white disc.
	1896	Canada (civil ensign variant)	A Red Ensign defaced with the coat of arms of the Dominion of Canada with the Crown of Saint Edward (Heraldry).
	1868–1921	Canada (naval ensign)	A Blue Ensign defaced with the coat of arms of the Dominion of Canada.
	1873–1921	Canada (civil ensign variant)	A Red Ensign defaced with the coat of arms of the Dominion of Canada.
	1905–1922	Canada (civil ensign variant)	A version of the Canadian Red Ensign defaced with the coat of arms of the Dominion of Canada that was used from 1905 until 1922.
	1905–1922	Canada (naval ensign variant)	A version of the Canadian Blue Ensign defaced with the coat of arms of the Dominion of Canada that was used from 1905 until 1922.
	1921–1931	Canada (civil ensign variant and de facto national flag)	A Red Ensign defaced with the coat of arms of the Dominion of Canada.
	1921–1931	Canada (civil ensign variant)	A Red Ensign defaced with the coat of arms of the Dominion of Canada within a white disc. Used at the opening ceremony of the 1936 Summer Olympic Games.
	1921–1931	Canada (naval ensign)	A Blue Ensign defaced with the coat of arms of the Dominion of Canada.

=== Cayman Islands ===
Flag	Date	Use	Description
	1958–1999	Cayman Islands	A blue ensign defaced with the coat of arms of the Cayman Islands within a white disc.
	1958–1999	Cayman Islands (Civil Ensign)	A red ensign defaced with the coat of arms of the Cayman Islands within a white disc.

=== Cape Colony ===
Flag	Date	Use	Description
	1876–1910	Cape Colony	A blue ensign defaced with the shield-of-arms of Cape Colony.

=== Cook Islands ===
Flag	Date	Use	Description
	1888–1893	Kingdom of Rarotonga	Three horizontal stripes of red, white and red, with three blue five-pointed stars on the right side of the white band, and a Union Jack in the canton.
	1893–1901	Cook Islands Federation	Three horizontal stripes of red, white and red, with a Union Jack (defaced with a palm tree on a mound of sand in the centre) in the canton.

=== Cyprus ===
Flag	Date	Use	Description
	1881–1922	Cyprus	A Blue Ensign defaced with the badge of British Cyprus
	1922–1960	Cyprus	A Blue Ensign defaced with two red lions.
	1922–1960	Cyprus (Civil Ensign)	A Red Ensign defaced with two red lions inside a white disc.

=== Dominica ===
Flag	Date	Use	Description
	1955–1965	Dominica	A Blue Ensign with the arms of Dominica
	1965–1978	Dominica	A Blue Ensign with the coat of arms of Dominica

=== Falkland Islands & Dependencies ===
Flag	Date	Use	Description
	1876–1925	Falkland Islands; Falkland Islands Dependencies	A blue ensign defaced with the seal of the Falkland Islands.
	1925–1948	Falkland Islands; Falkland Islands Dependencies	A blue ensign defaced with the Colonial Badge of the Falkland Islands.
	1948–1982	Falkland Islands; Falkland Islands Dependencies (1948–1982) (1982–1985)	A blue ensign defaced with the Coat of arms of the Falkland Islands on a white disc.
	1982–1999	Falkland Islands; Falkland Islands Dependencies (1948–1982) (1982–1985)	A blue ensign defaced with the Coat of arms of the Falkland Islands on a white disc.
	1948–1982	Falkland Islands (Civil Ensign)	The 1948–1999 Civil Ensign was a Red ensign defaced with the Coat of arms of the Falkland Islands on a white disc.
	1982–1999	Falkland Islands (Civil Ensign)	The 1948–1999 Civil Ensign was a Red ensign defaced with the Coat of arms of the Falkland Islands on a white disc.

=== Fiji ===
Flag	Date	Use	Description
	1877–1883	Fiji	A Blue Ensign with a white disc in the fly containing a badge of foliage and crossed war-clubs with a superimposed shield bearing a mermaid looking at herself in a hand mirror. The badge is based on what was then the seal of the Supreme Court of Fiji.
	1883–1903	Fiji	A Blue Ensign with a white disc in the fly displaying a Saint Edward's Crown surmounted by a crowned lion with the word "FIJI" beneath it.
	1903–1908	Fiji	A Blue Ensign with a white disc in the fly displaying a Tudor Crown surmounted by a crowned lion with the word "FIJI" beneath it.
	1908–1924	Fiji	A Blue Ensign with the coat of arms of Fiji on a white disc.
	1908–1970	Fiji (Civil Ensign)	A Red Ensign with the coat of arms of Fiji on a white disc.
	1924–1970	Fiji	A Blue Ensign with the coat of arms of Fiji centred on the fly half.

=== Gambia Colony and Protectorate ===
Flag	Date	Use	Description
	1889–1965	Gambia Colony and Protectorate	A blue ensign defaced with an elephant and the letters G. under the feet of the elephant all inside a disc.
	1889–1965	Gambia Colony and Protectorate (Civil Ensign)	A red ensign defaced with an elephant and the letters G. under the feet of the elephant all inside a disc.

=== Gibraltar ===
Flag	Date	Use	Description
	1875–1921	Gibraltar (Government Ensign)	A blue ensign defaced with the badge of Gibraltar on a white disc.
	1921–1939	Gibraltar (Government Ensign)	A blue ensign defaced with the badge of Gibraltar.
	1939–1999	Gibraltar (Government Ensign)	A blue ensign defaced with the badge of Gibraltar.
	1982–	Gibraltar	A white and red flag with the banner of the coat of arms of Gibraltar. Still currently used as the flag of Gibraltar.

=== Grenada ===
Flag	Date	Use	Description
	1875–1903	Grenada	A blue ensign defaced with the badge of Grenada on a disc.
	1903–1967	Grenada	A blue ensign defaced with the badge of Grenada on a disc.
	1967–1974	Grenada	Three equal horizontal stripes blue, yellow and green from top to bottom and a branch of a pomegranate inside a white oval in the middle.

=== Gilbert and Ellice Islands ===
Flag	Date	Use	Description
	1932–1976	Gilbert and Ellice Islands	A blue ensign defaced with the Coat of Arms of Gilbert and Ellice Islands.

=== Gilbert Islands ===
Flag	Date	Use	Description
	1976–1979	Gilbert Islands	A blue ensign defaced with the Coat of Arms of Gilbert Islands. Identical with the previous flag of Gilbert and Ellice Islands.

=== Gold Coast ===
Flag	Date	Use	Description
	1877–1957	Gold Coast	A blue ensign defaced with an elephant and the letters GC under the feet of the elephant all inside a disc
	1877–1957	Gold Coast (Civil Ensign)	A red ensign defaced with an elephant and the letters GC under the feet of the elephant all inside a disc

=== Heligoland ===
Flag	Date	Use	Description
	1807–1890	Heligoland	The flag of Heligoland with the Union Jack in the canton.
	1807–1890	Heligoland (Government Ensign)	A blue ensign defaced with the coat of arms of British Heligoland on a white disc in the fly.

=== Ionian Islands ===
Flag	Date	Use	Description
	1815–1864	Ionian Islands	A blue ensign defaced with the shield of the symbol of Mark the Evangelist (symbol of the Republic of Venice) and surrounded with the red border.

=== Iraq ===
Flag	Date	Use	Description
	1924–1932	Mesopotamia	Flag of Mandatory Iraq; continued to be used after independence until 1959.

=== Ireland ===
Flag	Date	Use	Description
	1922–1949	Irish Free State	A vertical tricolour of green, white and orange. Still used as the national flag for the Republic of Ireland.

=== Jamaica ===
Flag	Date	Use	Description
	1875–1906	Jamaica	A British Blue Ensign defaced with the Coat of arms of Colonial Jamaica within a white disc.
	1906–1957	Jamaica	A British Blue Ensign defaced with the Coat of arms of Colonial Jamaica within a white disc.
	1906–1957	Jamaica (Civil Ensign)	A British Red Ensign defaced with the Coat of arms of Colonial Jamaica within a white disc.
	1957–1962	Jamaica	A British Blue Ensign defaced with the Coat of arms of Colonial Jamaica within a white disc.
	1957–1962	Jamaica (Civil Ensign)	A British Red Ensign defaced with the Coat of arms of Colonial Jamaica within a white disc.
	1962	Jamaica	A British Blue Ensign defaced with the Coat of arms of Colonial Jamaica within a white disc.
	1962	Jamaica (Civil Ensign)	A British Red Ensign defaced with the Coat of arms of Colonial Jamaica within a white disc.

=== Kedah ===
Flag	Date	Use	Description
	1912–1950	Kedah Protectorate	A red flag with Kedah's coat of arms on the upper left. Still in use to this day.

=== Kenya ===
Flag	Date	Use	Description
	1920–1963	Kenya	A Blue Ensign defaced with a red lion rampant guardant.
	1920–1963	Kenya (Civil Ensign)	A Red Ensign defaced with a red lion rampant guardant.

=== Kuwait ===
Flag	Date	Use	Description
	1899–1914	Kuwait Protectorate	The flags of the Ottoman Empire were used.
	1914–1921	Kuwait Protectorate	A red flag with the word "Kuwait" in the center.
	1921–1940	Kuwait Protectorate	A red flag with the word "Kuwait" in the center and a Shahada in the fly half.
	1940–1961	Kuwait Protectorate	A red flag with the word "Kuwait" in the center and a Shahada and wasm sign in the fly half.

=== Labuan ===
Flag	Date	Use	Description
	1912–1946	Labuan	A blue ensign defaced with the badge of Labuan.

=== Lagos Colony ===
Flag	Date	Use	Description
	1888–1906	Lagos Colony	A blue ensign defaced with an elephant and the letter L. under the feet of the elephant all inside a disc

=== Lower Canada ===
Flag	Date	Use	Description
	1791–1801	Lower Canada	The Red Ensign of Great Britain.
	1801–1841	Lower Canada	The Red Ensign of the United Kingdom.

=== Malacca ===
Flag	Date	Use	Description
	1946–1957	Malacca	A blue ensign defaced with A Famosa motif.

=== Maldives ===
Flag	Date	Use	Description
	1903–1953	Maldives Protectorate	

=== Malta ===
Flag	Date	Use	Description
	19th century	Malta	A red ensign defaced with a white St George's cross.
	1875–1898	Malta	A blue ensign defaced with the badge of Malta in a white disc.
	1898–1923	Malta	A blue ensign defaced with the badge of Malta in a white disc.
	1898–1943	Malta (Civil Ensign)	A red ensign defaced with the badge of Malta in a white disc.
	1923–1943	Malta	A blue ensign defaced with the badge of Malta.
	1943–1964	Malta	A blue ensign defaced with the badge of Malta in a white disc.
	1943–1964	Malta (Civil Ensign)	A red ensign defaced with the badge of Malta in a white disc.

=== Montserrat ===
Flag	Date	Use	Description
	1909–1960	Montserrat	A Blue Ensign with the coat of arms of Montserrat in the fly.
	1960–1999	Montserrat	A Blue Ensign with the coat of arms of Montserrat in the fly.

=== Kingdom of Mosquitia ===
Flag	Date	Use	Description
	1824–1844	Kingdom of Mosquitia	Six horizontal stripes alternating blue and white, and in the canton, a Union Jack.

=== Muscat and Oman ===
Flag	Date	Use	Description
	1820–1970	Muscat and Oman Protectorate	

=== Natal Colony ===
Flag	Date	Use	Description
	1843–1910	Natal	A Blue Ensign defaced with the coat of arms of Natal.

=== New Guinea ===
Flag	Date	Use	Description
	1884–1888	British New Guinea	A blue British ensign with a white disc in the fly featuring the Tudor Crown over the initials "N.G.".
	1888–1906	British New Guinea	A blue British ensign with a white disc in the fly featuring the Tudor Crown over the initials "B.N.G.".
	1919–1949	Territory of New Guinea	A blue ensign defaced with a crown and the syllables T.N.G underneath inside a white disc.

=== New South Wales Colony ===
Flag	Date	Use	Description
	1867–1870	New South Wales Colony	A Blue Ensign defaced with the letters "NSW".
	1870–1876	New South Wales Colony	A Blue Ensign with gold stars; 5, 6, 7, 8, 9 points with the "Governor's Badge" located in the fly. The badge was the Southern Cross and an imperial crown situated above the Southern Cross.
	1876–1901	New South Wales Colony	A Blue Ensign with a badge located in the fly. The badge, based on the coat of arms, is a white disc with the cross of St George, a golden lion passant guardant in the centre of the cross and an eight-pointed gold star on each arm of the cross. This flag is still currently used as the state flag.

=== Newfoundland ===
Flag	Date	Use	Description
	1862–1870	Newfoundland	A white flag bearing the red cross of St George with a yellow crown at the centre.
	1870–1904	Newfoundland	A blue ensign defaced with a seal of the crown and underwritten is "Terra Nova".
	1904–1931 (used as Civil Ensign until 1965)	Newfoundland	A red ensign defaced with the Great Seal of Newfoundland and between 1907 and 1931 was the de facto national flag of Newfoundland. Used as a civil ensign until 1965.
	1904–1931	Newfoundland (Government Ensign)	A Blue Ensign defaced with the Great Seal of Newfoundland, primarily government and naval use.
	1931–1949 (Province flag until 1980)	Newfoundland	The Union Jack was used in Newfoundland as the national flag from 1931 until confederation with Canada in 1949 and was then used as the province flag until 1980.

=== New Zealand ===
- Note: Although it had been self-governing since 1852, New Zealand formally became an independent country from the United Kingdom under the Statute of Westminster Adoption Act 1947, which adopted the Statute of Westminster 1931.

Flag	Date	Use	Description
	1840–1902	New Zealand	Adopted following the signing of the Treaty of Waitangi in 1840.
	1867–1869	New Zealand (naval ensign)	A Blue Ensign defaced with the red letters “NZ” with white edge written into the lower fly half. This flag was used on New Zealand Government ships.
	1902	New Zealand (national flag)	A Blue Ensign with the Southern Cross of four white-edged red five-pointed stars centred on the fly half. This flag is still currently used as the National flag of New Zealand.
	1869	New Zealand (civil ensign)	A Red Ensign with the Southern Cross of four white five-pointed stars centred on the fly half. This flag is still currently used as the Civil Ensign of New Zealand.

=== Niger Coast Protectorate ===
Flag	Date	Use	Description
	1884–1893	Oil Rivers Protectorate	A blue ensign defaced with the badge of the Oil Rivers Protectorate in a disc.
	1893–1899	Niger Coast Protectorate	A blue ensign defaced with the badge of the Niger Coast Protectorate in a white disc.

=== North Borneo ===
Flag	Date	Use	Description
	1882–1902	North Borneo	A blue ensign defaced with the badge of the North Borneo Chartered Company.
	1882–1902	North Borneo (Civil Ensign)	A red ensign defaced with the badge of the North Borneo Chartered Company.
	1902–1948	North Borneo	A blue ensign defaced with the badge of the North Borneo Chartered Company.
	1902–1948	North Borneo (Civil Ensign)	A red ensign defaced with the badge of the North Borneo Chartered Company.
	1948–1963	North Borneo	A blue ensign defaced with the new badge of Crown Colony of North Borneo.
	1948–1963	North Borneo (Civil Ensign)	A red ensign defaced with the new badge of Crown Colony of North Borneo.

=== Nova Scotia ===
Flag	Date	Use	Description
	1858–	Nova Scotia	A blue saltire on a white field with the Royal Arms of Scotland in the centre. An unofficial banner of arms first used by the public in 1858, based on the then-disused 1625 arms of Nova Scotia. The Union Flag was Nova Scotia's official flag both before and after joining Canada in 1867. The 1625 arms were officially restored in 1929, and widely used as flag thereafter, but not officially adopted as the provincial flag until 2013.

=== Nyasaland ===
Flag	Date	Use	Description
	1914–1919	Nyasaland	A blue ensign defaced with the coat-of-arms of Nyasaland within a white circle.
	1919–1925	Nyasaland	A blue ensign defaced with a larger version of the coat-of-arms of Nyasaland.
	1925–1964	Nyasaland	A blue ensign defaced with the coat-of-arms of Nyasaland.

=== Orange River Colony ===
Flag	Date	Use	Description
	1900–1910	Orange River Colony	A blue ensign defaced with a springbok antelope in a disc

=== Palestine ===
Flag	Date	Use	Description
	1920–1948	British Mandate of Palestine	The Union Flag was used as the general land flag of the mandate. land flag of the mandate.
	1927–1948	British Mandate of Palestine (civil ensign)	A red ensign defaced with the word Palestine inside a white disc, for use by ships registered in the territory.
	1927–1948	British Mandate of Palestine	A blue ensign defaced with the word Palestine inside a white disc, for use by customs and postal service vessels.

=== Territory of Papua ===
Flag	Date	Use	Description
	1906–1949	Territory of Papua	A blue ensign defaced with a crown and the word Papua underneath inside a white disc.

=== Penang ===
Flag	Date	Use	Description
	1949–1952	Penang	A blue ensign defaced with the pre-1985 lesser arms of Penang.
	1952–1957	Penang	Flag badge depicting the areca nut palm tree leaved and fructed proper on a mound with a wreath of the colours of the settlement arms adopted on 16 June 1952 by the Settlement Council.

=== Pitcairn Islands ===
Flag	Date	Use	Description
	1984–	Pitcairn Islands	A blue ensign defaced with the coat of arms of the Pitcairn Islands.

=== Province of Canada ===
Flag	Date	Use	Description
	1841–1867	Province of Canada	The Flag of the United Kingdom.

=== Qatar ===
Flag	Date	Use	Description
	1916–1932	Qatar Protectorate	A white band on the hoist side, separated from a red area on the fly side by ten white triangles which act as a serrated line.
	1932–1936	Qatar Protectorate	A white band on the hoist side, separated from a maroon area on the fly side by eight white triangles which act as a serrated line.
	1936–1949	Qatar Protectorate	A nine-pointed serrated edge, diamonds and the word "Qatar".
	1949–1971	Qatar Protectorate	A white band on the hoist side, separated from a maroon area on the fly side by nine white triangles which act as a serrated line.

=== Queensland Colony ===
Flag	Date	Use	Description
	1859	Queensland Colony	On 10 December 1859, "a light blue flag with a red St George's Cross and union in the corner" (now known as the Queensland Separation Flag) was flown in Brisbane to mark Queensland's separation from New South Wales.
	1870–1876	Queensland Colony	A blue ensign defaced but no Badge present. In its place was a profile of Queen Victoria on a blue disc surrounded by a white annulus on which the word "Queensland" was inscribed in gold.
	1876–1901	Queensland Colony	British Blue Ensign defaced with the state badge on a white disc in the fly. The badge is a light blue Maltese Cross with an imperial crown in the centre of the cross. This flag is still currently used as the state flag of Queensland.

=== Saint Christopher-Nevis-Anguilla ===
Flag	Date	Use	Description
	1958–1967	Saint Christopher-Nevis-Anguilla	A blue ensign with the emblem of the territory in the fly.
	1967	Saint Christopher-Nevis-Anguilla	A vertical tricolour of green, yellow and blue.
	1967–1983	Saint Christopher-Nevis-Anguilla	A vertical tricolour of green, yellow and blue with a black palm tree in the centre.

=== Saint Helena and Dependencies ===
Flag	Date	Use	Description
	1874–1984	Saint Helena and Dependencies	A blue ensign defaced with the triangular coat of arms of Saint Helena.

=== Saint Lucia ===
Flag	Date	Use	Description
	1875–1939	Saint Lucia	A blue ensign defaced with the emblem of Saint Lucia.
	1939–1967	Saint Lucia	A blue ensign defaced with the emblem of Saint Lucia.
	1967–1979	Saint Lucia	A cerulean blue field with a gold triangle in front of a black isosceles triangle outlined in white in the centre.

=== Saint Vincent and the Grenadines ===
Flag	Date	Use	Description
	1877–1907	Saint Vincent and the Grenadines	A blue ensign defaced with the coat of arms of Saint Vincent and the Grenadines
	1907–1979	Saint Vincent and the Grenadines	A blue ensign defaced with the coat of arms of Saint Vincent and the Grenadines

=== Seychelles ===
Flag	Date	Use	Description
	1903–1961	Seychelles	A Blue Ensign defaced with a palm tree and a tortoise aside encircled.
	1903–1961	Seychelles (Civil Ensign)	A Red Ensign defaced with a palm tree and a tortoise aside encircled.
	1961–1976	Seychelles	A Blue Ensign defaced with the legend "Seychelles" on top a palm tree and a tortoise below encircled.
	1961–1976	Seychelles (Civil Ensign)	A Red Ensign defaced with the legend "Seychelles" on top a palm tree and a tortoise below encircled.

=== Sierra Leone ===
Flag	Date	Use	Description
	1889–1916	Sierra Leone	A Blue Ensign defaced with an elephant and the initials S.L. encircled.
	1916–1961	Sierra Leone	A Blue Ensign defaced with the coat of arms of Sierra Leone inside a white disc.
	1916–1961	Sierra Leone (Civil Ensign)	A Red Ensign defaced with the coat of arms of Sierra Leone inside a white disc.

=== South Australia Colony ===
Flag	Date	Use	Description
	1870–1876	South Australia Colony	A blue ensign defaced with a black disc in the fly containing the Southern Cross and the two pointers (Alpha and Beta Centauri).
	1876–1901	South Australia Colony	A blue ensign defaced with a badge design of an artistic rendition of the arrival of Britannia (a woman in flowing garb and holding a shield, representing the new settlers) meeting an Aboriginal person sitting with a spear on a rocky shoreline.

=== South Georgia and the South Sandwich Islands ===
Flag	Date	Use	Description
	1992–1999	South Georgia and the South Sandwich Islands	A Blue Ensign defaced with the Coat of arms of South Georgia and the South Sandwich Islands inside a white disc.

=== South Africa ===
- Note: South Africa formally became a country independent from the United Kingdom in 1931 after formally adopting the Statute of Westminster.

Flag	Date	Use	Description
	1910–1912	Union of South Africa	A red ensign defaced with the shield-of-arms of the Union of South Africa inside a white disc. This South Africa Red Ensign was South Africa's de facto national flag between 1910 and 1928 and was flown at times from Government buildings despite it only being officially used between 1910 and 1912.
	1910–1928	Union of South Africa	A blue ensign defaced with the shield-of-arms of the Union of South Africa The Blue Ensign was flown over the Union's offices abroad between 1910 and 1928.
	1912–1928	Union of South Africa	The design of the Red Ensign was modified slightly in 1912 when the shield was placed on a white disc so as to make it more distinguishable. The Red Ensign continued to be used as the flag of the South African merchant marine until 1951.
	1928–1961	Union of South Africa	A flag based on the Prince's Flag, with three smaller flags centred in the white stripe. The smaller flags were the Union Jack towards the hoist, the flag of Orange Free State hanging vertically and the Transvaal Vierkleur towards the fly. This flag continued to be used by the Republic of South Africa until 1994.

=== Rhodesia (Northern & Southern) ===
Flag	Date	Use	Description
	1890–1924 (Northern)	Rhodesia	A Union Jack with a lion holding ivory and initials of the British South Africa Company in the centre.
	1890–1923 (Southern)	Rhodesia	A Union Jack with a lion holding ivory and initials of the British South Africa Company in the centre.
	1924–1964	Northern Rhodesia	A blue ensign defaced with the shield-of-arms of Northern Rhodesia.
	1923–1953	Southern Rhodesia	A blue ensign defaced with the shield-of-arms of Southern Rhodesia.
	1968–1980	Southern Rhodesia	A blue ensign defaced with the shield-of-arms of Southern Rhodesia.
	1953–1963	Rhodesia and Nyasaland	A blue ensign defaced with the shield-of-arms of Rhodesia and Nyasaland.
	1964–1968	Southern Rhodesia	A light blue ensign defaced with the shield-of-arms of Southern Rhodesia.
	1979–1980	Southern Rhodesia	Flag of the United Kingdom.

=== Sarawak ===
Flag	Date	Use	Description
	1870–1946	Flag of the Sarawak Protectorate	A cross, half black and half red, on yellow based on shield-of-arms of Sarawak.
	1947–1963	Sarawak	A blue ensign defaced with the shield-of-arms of Sarawak inside a white disc.
	1947–1963	Sarawak (Civil Ensign)	A red ensign defaced with the shield-of-arms of Sarawak inside a white disc.

=== Singapore ===
Flag	Date	Use	Description
	Early 20th Century until 1942	Singapore	A blue ensign defaced with a white disc containing a lion under a tree with the word Singapore.

Flag	Date	Use	Description
	1946–1952	Singapore	A blue ensign defaced with a white disc containing a Tudor crown within a red inverted pall.
	1946–1952	Singapore (Civil Ensign)	A red ensign defaced with a white disc containing a Tudor crown within a red inverted pall.
	1952–1959	Singapore	A blue ensign defaced with a white disc containing Saint Edward's crown within a red inverted pall.
	1952–1959	Singapore (Civil Ensign)	A red ensign defaced with a white disc containing Saint Edward's crown within a red inverted pall.
	1959–1963	Singapore	A horizontal bicolour of red and white, defaced in the canton with a white crescent moon and a pentagon of five white stars. Still used as the national flag of the Republic of Singapore.

=== Sudan ===
Flag	Date	Use	Description
	1922–1955	Anglo-Egyptian Sudan	The Flag of the Kingdom of Egypt and the Union Jack used simultaneously.
	1955	Flag used during the 1955 Afro-Asian Conference	White flag with the word "SUDAN" in red.

=== Tanganyika ===
Flag	Date	Use	Description
	1923–1961	Tanganyika	A red ensign defaced with the head of a giraffe in a white disc.
	1923–1961	Tanganyika (Government Ensign)	A blue ensign defaced with the head of a giraffe.

=== Tasmania Colony ===
Flag	Date	Use	Description
	1875	Tasmania Colony	A white cross on a blue field, in the canton was the Union Flag, and in the fly was five five-pointed stars of the Southern Cross.
	1876–1901	Tasmania Colony	A defaced blue ensign with the state badge located in the fly. The badge is a white disc with a red lion passant in the centre of the disc. Still currently used as the state flag of Tasmania.

=== Transjordan ===
Flag	Date	Use	Description
	1921–1946	Transjordan (British Mandate of Jordan)	Flag of the Emirate of Transjordan.

=== Transvaal Colony ===
Flag	Date	Use	Description
	1900–1910	Transvaal	A blue ensign defaced with a disc showing a lion lying on an African plain with palm trees.

=== Trinidad and Tobago ===
Flag	Date	Use	Description
	1889–1958	Trinidad & Tobago	A Blue Ensign defaced with a circular badge depicting a ship arriving in front of a mountain.
	1889–1958	Trinidad & Tobago (Civil Ensign)	A Red Ensign defaced with a circular badge depicting a ship arriving in front of a mountain.
	1958–1962	Trinidad & Tobago	A Blue Ensign defaced with an escutcheon depicting a ship arriving in front of a mountain.
	1958–1962	Trinidad & Tobago (Civil Ensign)	A Red Ensign defaced with an escutcheon depicting a ship arriving in front of a mountain.

=== Tuvalu ===
Flag	Date	Use	Description
	1976–1978	Tuvalu	A blue ensign defaced with a circular badge with a hut and the motto of Tuvalu.

=== Turks and Caicos Islands ===
Flag	Date	Use	Description
	1889–1968	Turks and Caicos Islands	A blue ensign defaced with the former coat of arms of the Turks and Caicos Islands.
	1968–1999	Turks and Caicos Islands	A blue ensign defaced with the coat of arms of the Turks and Caicos Islands.
	1968–1999	Turks and Caicos Islands (Civil Ensign)	A red ensign defaced with the coat of arms of the Turks and Caicos Islands.

=== Trucial States ===
Flag	Date	Use	Description
	1820–various	Trucial States	Trucial Maritime flag
	1936–various	Trucial States	Trucial Maritime flag
	1964–1971	Trucial States	Unofficial flag of the Trucial States Council

=== Uganda ===
Flag	Date	Use	Description
	1914–1962	Uganda	A blue ensign defaced with a grey crowned crane inside a disc.
	1962	Uganda	Unofficial provisional flag of Uganda from March 1962 to 9 October 1962. Divided into vertical stripes of green-blue-green, separated by narrower yellow stripes, and in the centre the silhouette of a yellow crane.

=== Upper Canada ===
Flag	Date	Use	Description
	1791–1801	Upper Canada	The Red Ensign of Great Britain.
	1801–1841	Upper Canada	The Red Ensign of the United Kingdom.

=== Victoria Colony ===
Flag	Date	Use	Description
	1870–1877	Victoria Colony	A defaced British Blue Ensign with the Southern Cross located in the fly. The stars of the Southern Cross were white and had 5, 6, 7, 8 and 9 points with only the leftmost and rightmost stars having one point pointing to the top of the flag.
	1877	Victoria Colony	A defaced British Blue Ensign with the stars of the southern cross from then on having 5, 6, 7, 7 and 8 points in a white disc.
	1877–1901	Victoria Colony	A defaced British Blue Ensign with the stars of the southern cross from then on having 5, 6, 7, 7 and 8 points in a white disc.

=== Weihaiwei ===
Flag	Date	Use	Description
	1903–1930	Weihaiwei	A Blue Ensign defaced with two Mandarin ducks by a pond inside a disc.

=== Western Australia Colony ===
Flag	Date	Use	Description
	1870–1901	Western Australia Colony	A Blue Ensign defaced with a swan in a yellow disc. The flag was still used as the state flag until 1953.

=== Western Samoa ===
Flag	Date	Use	Description
	1914–1920	Western Samoa	The flag of New Zealand was used during the control of NZ-forces.
	1922–1962	Western Samoa	A Blue Ensign defaced with three palm trees encircled.

=== West Indies Federation ===
Flag	Date	Use	Description
	1958–1962	West Indies Federation	It has four equally-spaced narrow white stripes with a large orange-gold disc over the middle two lines in the centre of the flag, undulating horizontally across a blue field.

=== Zanzibar ===
Flag	Date	Use	Description
	1896–1963	Zanzibar	A red flag used during the British protectorate.

== Historical governors' flags ==
Flag	Date	Use	Description
	1869–1901	Flag of the governor-general of Canada	A Union Jack, defaced with a white circle, at the centre of which is the crowned shield of arms of Canada in 1869, surrounded by a wreath of green maple leaves.
	1901–1921	Flag of the governor-general of Canada	A Union Jack, defaced with a white circle, at the centre of which is the crowned shield of arms of Canada in 1869, surrounded by a wreath of green maple leaves.
	1921–1931	Flag of the governor-general of Canada	A Union Jack, defaced with a white circle, at the centre of which is the crowned shield of arms of Canada in 1921, surrounded by a wreath of stylize green maple leaves.
	1869–1874	Flag of the governor of New Zealand	A Union Jack defaced with four white stars in the form of a cross. This design was due to a misinterpretation of design instructions.
	1874–1908	Flag of the governor of New Zealand	A Union Jack defaced with a white circle with four red stars and the initial 'NZ' in the center. The whole surrounded by a green wreath.
	1908–1936	Flag of the governor of New Zealand	A Union Jack defaced with a white circle with four red stars and the initial 'NZ' in the center. The whole surrounded by a wreath of fern.
	1875–1948	Flag of the governor of Ceylon	A Union Jack defaced with the badge of Ceylon.
	1875 – c. 1898	Flag of the governor of Malta	A Union Jack defaced with the Badge of Malta.
	c. 1898 – 1943	Flag of the governor of Malta	A Union Jack defaced with the Badge of Malta.
	1943–1964	Flag of the governor of Malta	A Union Jack defaced with the Badge of Malta.
	1875–1906	Flag of the governor of Jamaica	A Union Jack defaced with the Badge of Colonial Jamaica.
	1906–1957	Flag of the governor of Jamaica	A Union Jack defaced with the Badge of Colonial Jamaica.
	1957–1962	Flag of the governor of Jamaica	A Union Jack defaced with the Badge of Colonial Jamaica.
	1962	Flag of the governor of Jamaica	A Union Jack defaced with the Badge of Colonial Jamaica.
	1877–1883	Flag of the governor of Fiji	A Union Jack defaced with a white disc in the centre surrounded by a laurel wreath and containing a badge of foliage and crossed war-clubs with a superimposed shield bearing a mermaid looking at herself in a hand mirror.
	1883–1903	Flag of the governor of Fiji	A Union Jack defaced with a white disc in the centre surrounded by a laurel wreath and containing a Saint Edward's Crown surmounted by a crowned lion with the word "FIJI" beneath it.
	1903–1908	Flag of the governor of Fiji	A Union Jack defaced with a white disc in the centre surrounded by a laurel wreath and containing a Tudor Crown surmounted by a crowned lion with the word "FIJI" beneath it.
	1908–1970	Flag of the governor of Fiji	A Union Jack defaced with the full coat of arms of Fiji on a white disc surrounded by a laurel wreath in the centre.
	1881–1905	Flag of the high commissioner of Cyprus	A Union Jack defaced with the letters "C.H.C".
	1905–1960	Flag of the high commissioner and the governor of Cyprus	A Union Jack defaced with two red lions.
	1882–1903	Flag of the governor of North Borneo	A yellow flag with lion in the centre pointing towards the right direction.
	1903–1915	Flag of the governor of North Borneo	A yellow flag with lion in the centre pointing towards the left direction.
	1915–1946	Flag of the governor of North Borneo	A Union Jack defaced with the Badge of North Borneo.
	1948–1963	Flag of the governor of North Borneo Crown Colony	A Union Jack defaced with the Badge of North Borneo Crown Colony.
	1884–1981	Flag of the governor of British Honduras	A Union Jack defaced with the Badge of British Honduras. Also used on the Colony of the Bay Islands.
	1885–1947	Flag used by the British governors-general, governors, lieutenant governors, chief commissioners and other British officers in India	A Union Jack defaced with the Star of India surmounted by the Tudor Crown.
	1899–1903	Flag of the commissioner of Weihaiwei	A Union Jack defaced with Chinese dragon in a yellow disc.
	1903–1930	Flag of the commissioner of Weihaiwei	A Union Jack defaced with a pair of Mandarin ducks.
	1902–1909	Flag of the governor-general of Australia	A Union Jack defaced with a six pointed star, surmounted with the Tudor Crown, surrounded by ears of corn and a gold circlet.
	1909–1936	Flag of the governor-general of Australia	A Union Jack defaced with a seven pointed star, surmounted with the Tudor Crown, surrounded by ears of corn and a gold circlet.
	1903–1961	Flag of the governor of Seychelles	A Union Jack defaced with the Badge of Colonial Seychelles.
	1961–1976	Flag of the governor of Seychelles	A Union Jack defaced with the Badge of Colonial Seychelles.
	1874–1904	Flag of the governor of the Straits Settlements	A Union Jack defaced with the badge of Straits Settlements.
	1904–1946	Flag of the governor of the Straits Settlements	A Union Jack defaced with the badge of Straits Settlements.
	1906–1968	Flag of the governor of Mauritius	A Union Jack defaced with the Badge of Colonial Mauritius.
	1906–1953	Flag of the resident commissioner of the British New Hebrides	A Union Jack defaced with the badge of British New Hebrides.
	1952–1980	Flag of the resident commissioner of the British New Hebrides	A Union Jack defaced with the badge of British New Hebrides.
	1910–1955	Flag flown on Government House, Hong Kong and the governor's official car during British rule	A Union Jack defaced with the then Colonial Badge of Hong Kong.
	1955–1959	Flag flown on Government House, Hong Kong and the governor's official car during British rule	A Union Jack defaced with the then Colonial Badge of Hong Kong.
	1959–1997	Flag flown on Government House, Hong Kong and the governor's official car during British rule	A Union Jack defaced with the then Coat of arms of Hong Kong.
	1910–1931	Flag of the governor-general of the Union of South Africa	A Union Jack defaced with the Coat of Arms of South Africa.
	1914–1952	Flag of the governor(-general) of Nigeria	A Union Jack defaced with the Badge of Nigeria.
	1952–1960	Flag of the governor(-general) of Nigeria	A Union Jack defaced with the Badge of Nigeria.
	1914–1964	Flag of the governor of Nyasaland	A Union Jack defaced with the badge of Nyasaland.
	1921–1922	Flag of the Lord Lieutenant of Ireland	A Union Flag defaced with an Irish Harp.
	Until 1973	Personal flag of the governor of Northern Ireland	A Union Jack defaced with the Coat of arms of Northern Ireland.
	1922–1956	Flag of the governor-general of the Sudan	A Union Flag defaced with a white disc surrounded by a wreath of laurel. As no badge or coat of arms existed for Anglo-Egyptian Sudan, the disc instead contained the words "Governor General of the SUDAN".
	1924–1951	Flag of the governor of Southern Rhodesia	A Union Jack defaced with the shield from Coat of Arms of Southern Rhodesia.
	1951–1952	Flag of the governor of Southern Rhodesia	A blue flag with a Tudor Crown in the centre (in official proportions of 7:9).
	1952–1965 (de jure 1952–1970)	Flag of the governor of Southern Rhodesia	A blue flag with a St. Edward's Crown in the centre (in official proportions of 7:9).
	1940–1952	Household flag of the governor of Southern Rhodesia	A red flag with a Tudor Crown in the centre, used as a car flag.
	1952–1965	Household flag of the governor of Southern Rhodesia	A red flag with the representation of the Zimbabwe Bird in yellow, used as a car flag.
	1929–2024	Personal flag of the lieutenant governor of Nova Scotia	A Union Jack defaced with the shield of the Arms of Her Majesty in Right of Nova Scotia surrounded by a circle of 18 green maple leaves.
	1939–1964	Flag of the governor of Northern Rhodesia	A Union Jack defaced with the shield from Coat of Arms of Northern Rhodesia.
	1946–1963	Flag of the governor of Sarawak	A Union Jack defaced with the Badge of Sarawak Crown Colony.
	1946–1952	Flag of the governor of Singapore	A Union Jack defaced with the Badge of Singapore Crown Colony.
	1952–1959	Flag of the governor of Singapore	A Union Jack defaced with the Badge of Singapore Crown Colony.
	1951–1966	Flag of the resident commissioner of Basutoland	A Union Jack defaced with the badge of Basutoland.
	1953–1963	Flag of the governor-general of the Federation of Rhodesia and Nyasaland	A dark blue flag with the crest from the royal coat of arms of the United Kingdom at the top, and the words "Federation of Rhodesia and Nyasaland" on a golden scroll below.
	1955–1963	Flag of the British resident of Zanzibar	A Union Jack defaced with a badge of sailboat that surmounted by a crown.
	1959–1965	Flag of the lieutenant governor of Ontario	The Canadian Red Ensign defaced by a disc bearing the shield of the Arms of Ontario surrounded by a chain of green maple leaves.
	1956–1967	Flag used by the British governor of Antigua and Barbuda	A Union Jack defaced with the Coat of arms of Antigua and Barbuda.
	1967–1981	Flag used by the British governor of Antigua and Barbuda	A Union Jack defaced with the Coat of arms of Antigua and Barbuda.
	1807–1890	Flag of the Lieutenant-Governor of British Heligoland	A Union Jack defaced with the Coat of arms of British Heligoland.
	1875–1910	Flag of the governor of Bermuda	A Union Jack defaced with the then Coat of arms of Bermuda.
	1910–1999	Flag of the governor of Bermuda	A Union Jack defaced with the Coat of arms of Bermuda.
	1958–1999	Flag of the governor of the Cayman Islands	A Union Jack defaced with the Coat of arms of the Cayman Islands.
	1876–1925	Flag of the governor of the Falkland Islands	A Union Jack defaced with the then Colonial Badge of the Falkland Islands.
	1925–1948	Flag of the governor of the Falkland Islands	A Union Jack defaced with the then Colonial Badge of the Falkland Islands.
	1948–1999	Flag of the governor of the Falkland Islands	A Union Jack defaced with the Coat of arms of the Falkland Islands.
	1875–1939	Flag of the governor of Gibraltar	A Union Jack defaced with the then Colonial Badge of Gibraltar.
	1939–1982	Flag of the governor of Gibraltar	A Union Jack defaced with the then Colonial Badge of Gibraltar.
	1982–1999	Flag of the governor of Gibraltar	A Union Jack defaced with the Coat of arms of Gibraltar.

== Others ==
Flag	Date	Use	Description
	1600–1858	Flag of the English/British East India Company	Numerous white and red stripes (no set number) with the St George's Cross in the canton.
	1707–1800	Flag of the British East India Company	Numerous white and red stripes with the Union Jack of Great Britain in the canton. Accepted to be one of the inspirations for the Continental Union Flag that eventually evolved into the national flag of the United States.
	1801–1858	Flag of the British East India Company	Numerous white and red stripes with the Union Jack of the United Kingdom in the canton.
	Until 1723	Pirate flag of Thomas Anstis	A Union Jack of Great Britain with four grenades.
	1682–1707	Flag of the Hudson's Bay Company	The English Red Ensign defaced with the initials of the company.
	1707–1801	Flag of the Hudson's Bay Company	The pre-1801 Red Ensign defaced with the initials of the company.
	c. 1801–1965	Flag of the Hudson's Bay Company	A Red Ensign defaced with the initials of the company.
	pre–1801	Flag of the North West Company	The pre-1801 Red Ensign defaced with the initials of the company.
	c. 1801–1821	Flag of the North West Company	A Red Ensign defaced with the initials of the company.
	1889–1961	Flag of the British South Africa Company	A Union Jack with the logo of the British South Africa Company in the middle.
	1889–1961	Ensign of the British South Africa Company	A Blue Ensign defaced with the Symbol of the British South Africa Company.
	1801–1922	Flag of the Lord Lieutenant of Ireland	The Union Jack defaced with the Coat of Arms of Ireland.
	c. 1701–post 1800	Green Ensign	An unofficial merchant navy flag consisting of a green field with an earlier version of the golden harp and the Flag of England in the canton, no record of its actual use.
	Post 1800–c. 1922	Green Ensign	An unofficial merchant navy flag consisting of green field with golden harp and the Union Jack in the canton, no record of its actual use.
	Post 1910–c. 1921	British Empire flag	An unofficial flag of the British Empire featuring its constituent dominions and India. Its origins are unclear, but it could not have been in use until after 1910 when South Africa was granted a coat of arms. Flown by civilians throughout the empire for coronations, the British Empire Exhibition and Empire Day. This variant was likely created for the 1911 coronation of King George V.
	1921–	British Empire flag of the Dangarsleigh War Memorial	An unofficial flag of the British Empire featuring its constituent dominions and India. A unique design was featured at the 1921 opening of the Dangarsleigh War Memorial, and it is still sometimes flown today on special occasions.
	Post 1930–c. 1945	British Empire flag	An unofficial flag of the British Empire featuring its constituent dominions and India. This variant was likely created for the 1937 coronation of King George VI.

== See also ==
- British ensign
- British Empire
- British Blue Ensign
- British Red Ensign
- List of countries and territories with the Union Jack displayed on their flag
- Continental Union Flag
- Flag of the United Kingdom
- Flag of Australia
- Flag of Canada
- Flag of New Zealand
