= List of countries and territories with the Union Jack displayed on their flag =

This is a list of current and former countries and territories with a flag that incorporates the present Union Jack or the first Union Flag. Five Commonwealth nations have the Union Jack on their national flag. The only British Overseas Territory without the Union Jack on its flag is Gibraltar.

The list also includes overseas territories, provinces and states.

== Current ==
=== Sovereign countries ===
Country	Flag	Adopted	Form of government
Australia	Australia	1908	Commonwealth realm
New Zealand	New Zealand	1902	Commonwealth realm
Tuvalu	Tuvalu	1978/1997	Commonwealth realm
United Kingdom	United Kingdom	1801	Commonwealth realm
Fiji	Fiji	1970	Commonwealth republic

The Union Flag is an official ceremonial flag of Canada, known as the Royal Union Flag.

=== Overseas territories ===
Overseas Territory	Flag	Adopted	Type	Sovereign country
Akrotiri and Dhekelia	Akrotiri and Dhekelia	1878/1960	British Overseas Territory	United Kingdom
Anguilla	Anguilla	1990	British Overseas Territory	United Kingdom
Ascension Island	Ascension Island	2013	British Overseas Territory	United Kingdom
Bermuda	Bermuda	1910	British Overseas Territory	United Kingdom
British Antarctic Territory	British Antarctic Territory	1998	British Overseas Territory	United Kingdom
British Indian Ocean Territory	British Indian Ocean Territory	1990	British Overseas Territory	United Kingdom
British Virgin Islands	British Virgin Islands	1960	British Overseas Territory	United Kingdom
Cayman Islands	Cayman Islands	1958	British Overseas Territory	United Kingdom
Falkland Islands	Falkland Islands	1999	British Overseas Territory	United Kingdom
Montserrat	Montserrat	1909	British Overseas Territory	United Kingdom
Pitcairn Islands	Pitcairn Islands	1984	British Overseas Territory	United Kingdom
South Georgia and the South Sandwich Islands	South Georgia and the South Sandwich Islands	1985	British Overseas Territory	United Kingdom
Tristan da Cunha	Tristan da Cunha	2002	British Overseas Territory	United Kingdom
Turks and Caicos Islands	Turks and Caicos Islands	1968	British Overseas Territory	United Kingdom
Saint Helena	Saint Helena	1984	British Overseas Territory	United Kingdom
Cook Islands	Cook Islands	1979	Realm of New Zealand	New Zealand
Niue	Niue	1975	Realm of New Zealand	New Zealand
Ross Dependency	Ross Dependency	1975	Realm of New Zealand	New Zealand

=== Federal provinces and states ===
Federal subject	Flag	Adopted	Status	Sovereign country
British Columbia	British Columbia	1960	Province of Canada	Canada
Ontario	Ontario	1965	Province of Canada	Canada
Manitoba	Manitoba	1966	Province of Canada	Canada
Newfoundland and Labrador	Newfoundland and Labrador	1980	Province of Canada	Canada
Victoria	Victoria (state)	1870	State of Australia	Australia
New South Wales	New South Wales	1876	State of Australia	Australia
Queensland	Queensland	1876	State of Australia	Australia
Tasmania	Tasmania	1876	State of Australia	Australia
South Australia	South Australia	1904	State of Australia	Australia
Western Australia	Western Australia	1953	State of Australia	Australia
Hawaii	Hawaii	1845	U.S. state	United States

=== Counties and Municipalities ===
Place	Flag	Adopted	Sovereign country
Amherstburg, Ontario			Canada
Bath, Ontario		1997	Canada
Cupids, Newfoundland and Labrador			Canada
Fredericton, New Brunswick			Canada
Gananoque, Ontario		2000	Canada
Loyalist, Ontario		1999	Canada
Niagara-on-the-Lake, Ontario		2013	Canada
Picton, Ontario		1989	Canada
Coquimbo			Chile
Bedford County, Pennsylvania		2008	United States
East Baton Rouge Parish, Louisiana		2025	United States
Somerset County, Maryland		1694	United States
Westmoreland County, Pennsylvania		1775/1973	United States
Baton Rouge, Louisiana		1995	United States
Bridgeport, Alabama		1992	United States
Mobile, Alabama		1968	United States
New Castle, Delaware		2021	United States
Princess Anne, Maryland			United States
Spanish Fort, Alabama			United States
Taunton, Massachusetts		1974	United States
Weymouth Township, New Jersey			United States

=== Other ===
Place	Flag	Adopted	Sovereign Country
Lord Howe Island, New South Wales		1988 (Note: The Lord Howe Island flag, first flown in November 1988, is not official.)	Australia
Vancouver Island, British Columbia		1988	Canada

== Former ==
=== Sovereign countries ===
Country	Flag (previous)	Years	Flag (today)
Australia		1901–1908	
Canada		1868–1965 (Note: The Canadian Red Ensign was formally a civil ensign, although was treated as a de facto national flag for Canada from the late 19th century to 1965. The emblem on the Canadian Red Ensign has seen several design alterations during that period, although the Union Jack has remained consistent. The Union Jack itself was used as the official flag of Canada until the adoption of the Maple Leaf flag in 1965.)	
Fiji		1874-1970	Fiji
Rhodesia		1923–1968	
South Africa		1928–1994	
Ireland	United Kingdom	1801–1922	Republic of Ireland
United States		1776–1777	

=== Overseas Territories ===
Overseas Territory	Flag (previous)	Years	Flag (today)
British Protectorate of Aden		1937–1963	
Antigua and Barbuda		1956–1967	
The Bahamas		1869–1973	
Barbados		1870–1966	
Belize		1870–1981	
Burma (Myanmar)		1939–1948	
Cape Colony		1806–1910	Namibia; South Africa; Lesotho
Ceylon (Sri Lanka)		1875–1948	
Colony of New Zealand		1841–1907	New Zealand
Cyprus		1881–1960	
Dominica		1875–1978	
The Gambia		1870–1965	
Gilbert Islands (Kiribati)		1937–1979	
Gold Coast (Ghana)		1877–1957	
Grenada		1875–1967	
British Guiana (Guyana)		1875–1966	
Hong Kong		1871–1997	
India		1858–1947	
Jamaica		1875–1962	
Kenya		1893–1963	
Malta		1800–1964	
Mauritius		1810–1968	
British New Hebrides (Vanuatu)		1906–1980	
Nigeria		1870–1960	
Northern Rhodesia (Zambia)		1924–1964	
Nyasaland (Malawi)		1893–1964	
Saint Christopher-Nevis-Anguilla		1882–1967	Saint Kitts and Nevis; Anguilla
Saint Lucia		1796–1967	Saint Lucia
Saint Vincent and the Grenadines		1877–1979	Saint Vincent and the Grenadines
Seychelles		1961–1976	Seychelles
Sierra Leone		1916–1961	
Singapore		1952–1959	
Solomon Islands		1966–1977	
British Somaliland (Somaliland)		1952–1960	Somalia
Tanganyika		1923–1961	
Transvaal Colony		1903–1910	South Africa; Eswatini
Trinidad and Tobago		1958–1962	
Uganda		1914–1962	Uganda
United States of the Ionian Islands		1815–1864	
Western Samoa (Samoa)		1925–1948	

=== Federal provinces, territories and states ===
Settlement	Flag (previous)	Years	Flag (today)
Bengal Presidency		1699 – 1947	
Bombay Presidency		1662 – 1950	India; Pakistan
British West Florida		1763–1783	Florida; Alabama; Mississippi; Louisiana
Colony of British Columbia (Colony of Vancouver Island)		1849–1871	
Dominion of Newfoundland		1870 – 1949	
Colony of Natal		1843 – 1910	
Malacca		1951–1957	
New South Wales		1788-1876	
North Borneo (Sabah)		1882–1963	
Orange River Colony		1904–1910	
Penang		1874–1957	
Punjab Province		1849 – 1947	India; Pakistan
Province of Canada		1841–1867	Quebec; Ontario
Province of Quebec		1763–1791	
Sarawak		1947–1963	
United Provinces of Agra and Oudh		1902 – 1937	
Upper Canada		1791–1841	
Western Australia		1870–1953	

=== Settlement ===
Settlement	Flag (previous)	Years	Flag (today)
British Weihaiwei		1898 – 1930	
Diggers' Republic		1870 – 1871	
Shanghai International Settlement		c. 1917 – 1943	

== See also ==
- List of United Kingdom flags
- Historical flags of the British Empire and the overseas territories
