= Seal of Solomon =

Signet ring attributed to the Israelite king Solomon

Seal of Solomon

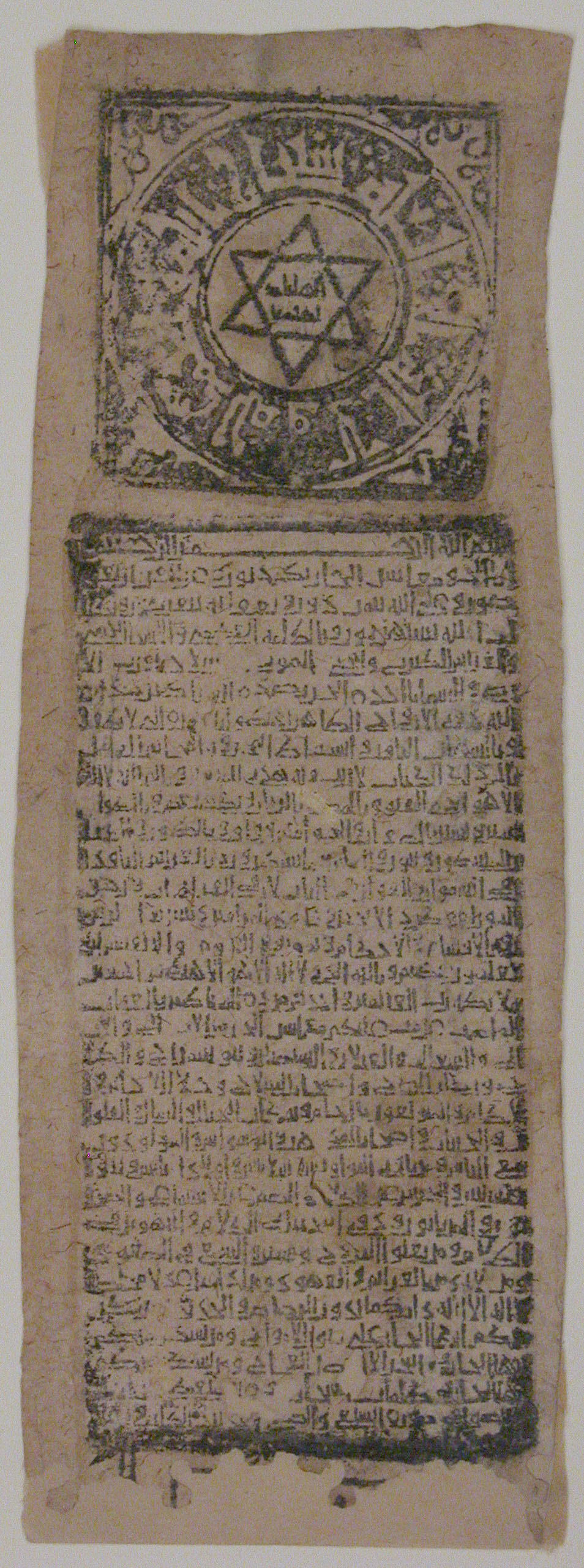
Talismanic scroll bearing the Seal of Solomon, 11th-century Fatimid Caliphate

The Seal of Solomon or Ring of Solomon (Hebrew: חותם שלמה, Ḥotam Shlomo; Arabic: خاتم سليمان, Khātam Sulaymān) is the legendary signet ring attributed to King Solomon in medieval mystical traditions, from which it developed in parallel within Jewish mysticism, Islamic mysticism and Western occultism.

It is often depicted in the shape of either a hexagram or a pentagram. In mystic Jewish lore, the ring is variously described as having given Solomon the power to command the supernatural, including shedim and jinn, and also the ability to speak with animals. Due to the proverbial wisdom of Solomon, it came to be seen as an amulet or talisman, or a symbol or character in medieval magic and Renaissance magic, occultism, and alchemy.

The seal is the predecessor to the Star of David, a Jewish symbol, and in modern vexillology, it features on the flag of Israel. The star on the flag of Morocco, adopted in 1915, also originally represented Solomon's Seal, and the Seal of Solomon was also depicted on the flag of Nigeria during British colonial rule.

== History ==
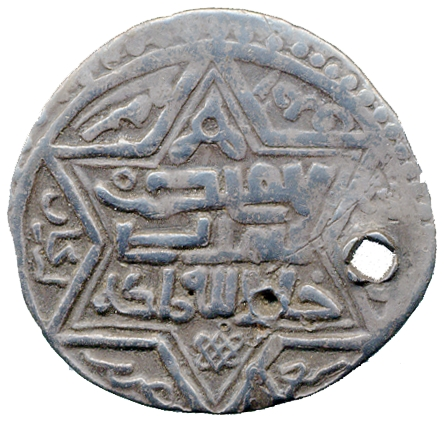
Silver dirham coin minted in the name of Eretna in 1351 CE in Erzincan, Turkey. It includes an inscription in the Uyghur script that reads Sultan Adil.

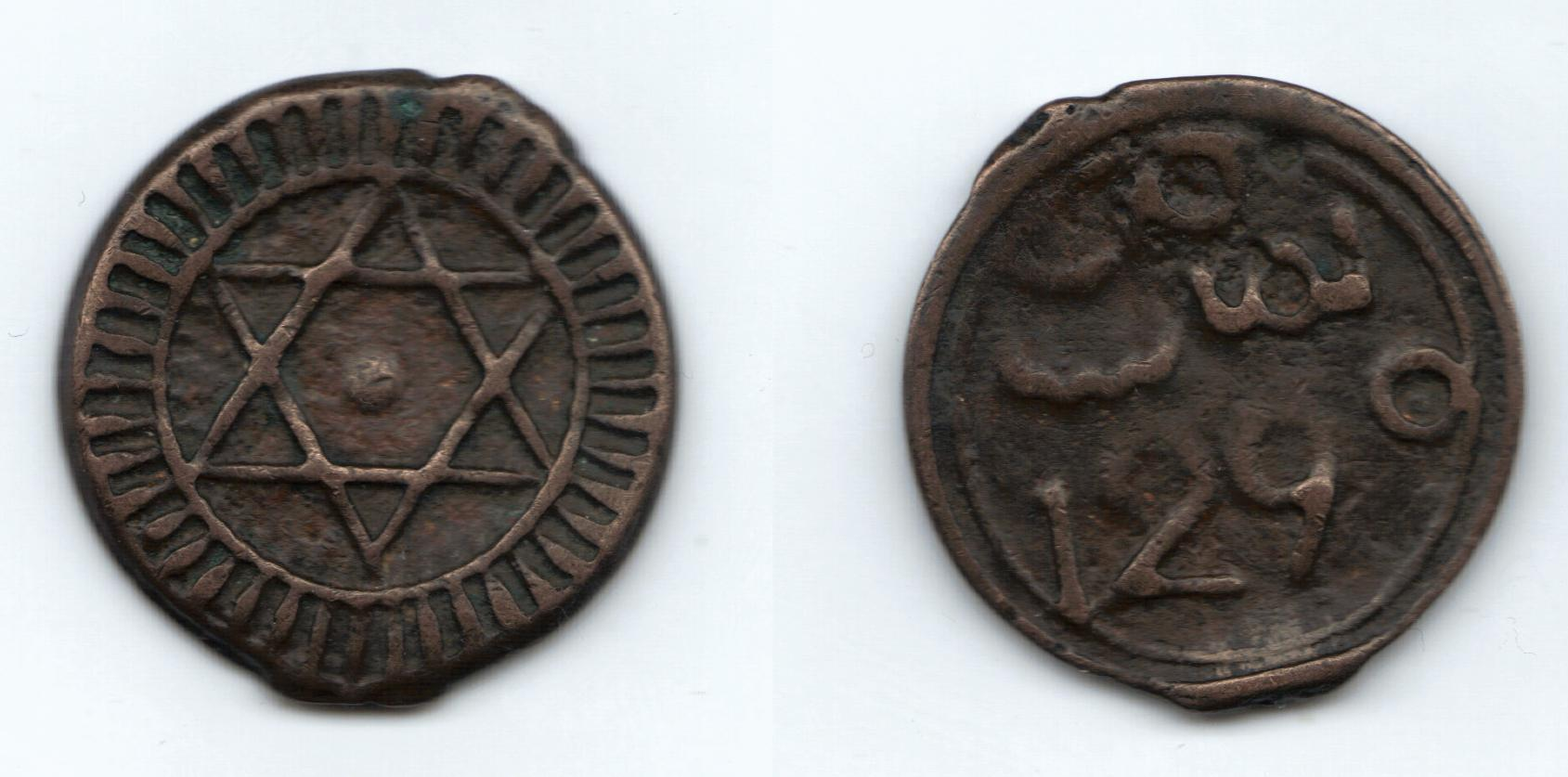
A hexagram on the obverse of a Moroccan 4 Falus coin, dated AH 1290 (AD 1873/4).

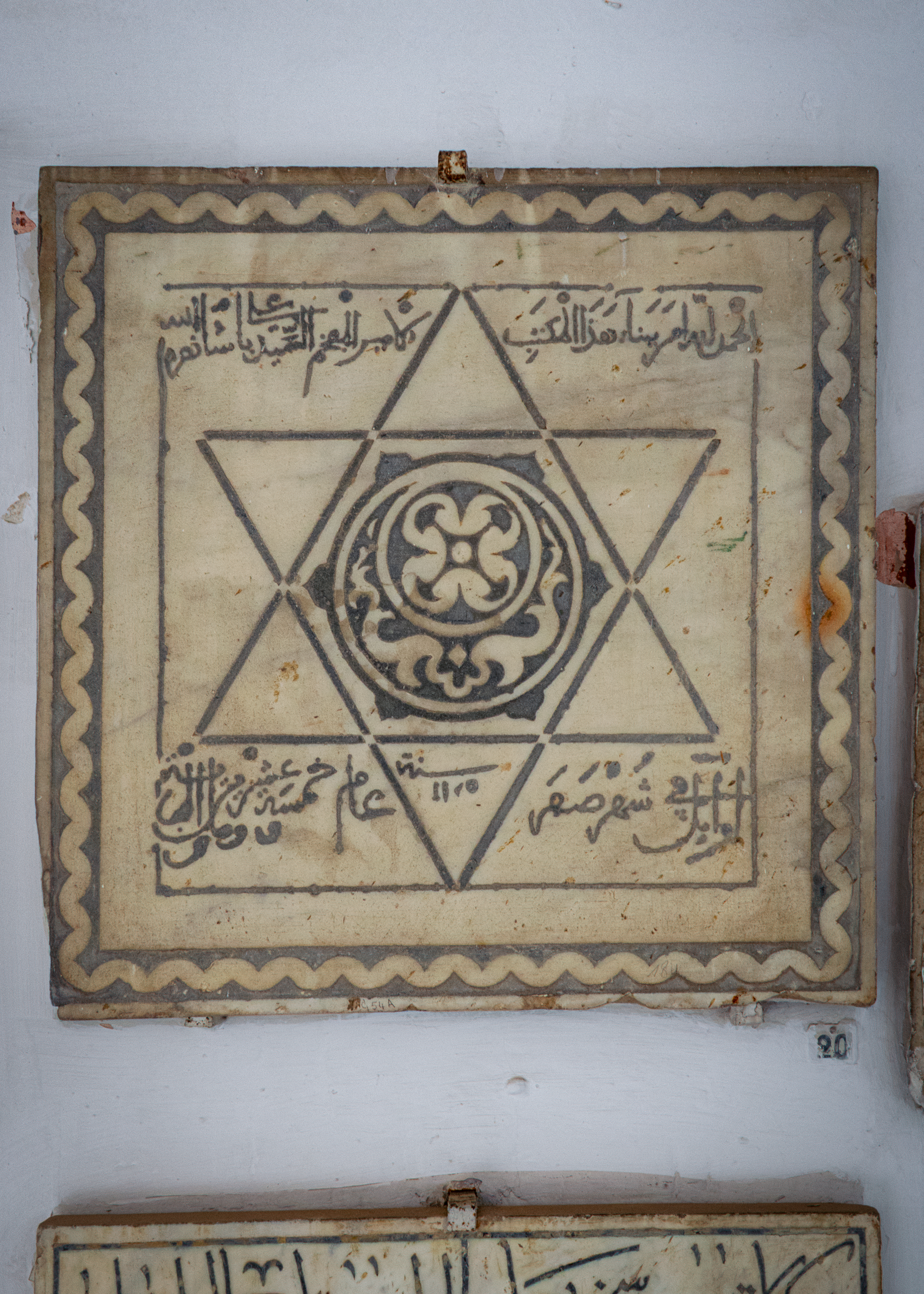
Inscription about a school built by Dey Baba Ali Chaouch during the Regency of Algiers, 1125 AH (1713 AD)

A variant form of the "Secret Seal of Solomon", as seen in the 17th-century grimoire The Lesser Key of Solomon.

The date of origin legends surrounding the Seal of Solomon is difficult to establish. A legend of a magic ring with which the possessor could command demons was already current in the 1st century (Josephus tells of one Eleazar who used such a ring in the presence of Vespasian), but the association of the name of Solomon with such a ring is likely medieval, notwithstanding the 2nd century apocryphal Judeo-Christian text Testament of Solomon. The Tractate Gittin (fol. 68) of the Talmud has a story involving Solomon, Asmodeus, and a ring with the divine name engraved: Solomon gives the ring and a chain to one Benaiahu son of Jehoiada to catch the demon Ashmedai, to obtain the demon's help to build the temple; Ashmedai later tricks Solomon into giving him the ring and swallows it. (Note: "Solomon thereupon sent thither Benaiahu son of Jehoiada, giving him a chain on which was graven the [Divine] Name and a ring on which was graven the Name and fleeces of wool and bottles of wine. Benaiahu went and dug a pit lower down the hill, and let the water flow into it[13] and stopped [the hollow] with the fleeces of wool, and he then dug a pit higher up and poured the wine into it[14] and then filled up the pits. He then went and sat on a tree. When Ashmedai came he examined the seal, then opened the pit and found it full of wine. He said, 'it is written, Wine is a mocker, strong drink a brawler, and whosoever erreth thereby is not wise,[15] and it is also written, Whoredom and wine and new wine take away the understanding.[16] I will not drink it.' Growing thirsty, however, he could not resist, and he drank till he became drunk, and fell asleep. Benaiahu then came down and threw the chain over him and fastened it. When he awoke he began to struggle, whereupon he [Benaiahu] said, The Name of thy Master is upon thee, the Name of thy Master is upon thee. [...] Solomon kept him [Ashmedai] with him until he had built the Temple. One day when he was alone with him, he said, 'it is written, He hath as it were to'afoth and re'em' ["the strength of a wild ox"], 'and we explain that to'afoth means the ministering Angels and re'em means the demons. What is your superiority over us?' He said to him, 'Take the chain off me and give me your ring, and I will show you.' So he took the chain off him and gave him the ring. He then swallowed him, [viz. "it": the ring] and placing one wing on the earth and one on the sky he hurled him four hundred parasangs. In reference to that incident, Solomon said, What profit is there to a man in all his labor wherein he laboureth under the sun?")

The specification of the design of the seal as a hexagram seems to arise from a medieval Arab tradition, and most scholars assume that the symbol entered the Kabbalistic tradition of medieval Spain from Arabic literature. The representation as a pentagram, by contrast, seems to arise in the Western tradition of Renaissance magic (which was in turn strongly influenced by medieval Arab and Jewish occultism); W. Kennett (1660–1728) makes reference to a "pentangle of Solomon" with the power of exorcising demons.

According to Jewish scholar Gershom Scholem, the founder of the modern, academic study of Kabbalah: "It is difficult to say for how long certain definite names have been used for several of the most common seals. The Arabs made many such terms especially popular, but just the names Seal of Solomon and Shield of David, which are often used interchangeably for the two emblems, go back to pre-Islamic Jewish magic." Other scholars have demonstrated a wide variety of other origins for its use, including late Babylonian, cuneiform from ancient Mesopotamia, Egyptian hieroglyphs, early Ancient South Arabian script, Tifinagh, Ancient Greek alphabet, Indian Hinduism and Byzantine Greeks.

The legend of the Seal of Solomon was developed further by medieval Middle Eastern writers, who related that the ring was engraved by God and was given to the king directly from heaven. The ring was made from brass and iron, and the two parts were used to seal written commands to good and evil spirits, respectively. In one tale, a demon—either Asmodeus or Sakhr—obtained possession of the ring and ruled in Solomon's stead for forty days. In a variant of the tale of the ring of Polycrates from Herodotus, the demon eventually threw the ring into the sea, where it was swallowed by a fish, caught by a charitable fisherman, who unknowingly fed it to the displaced Solomon, restoring him to power. (Note: "Solomon is represented as having authority over spirits, animals, wind, and water, all of which obeyed his orders by virtue of a magic ring set with the four jewels given him by the Angels that had power over these four realms. [...] It was Solomon's custom to take off the ring when he was about to wash, and to give it to one of his wives, Amina, to hold. On one occasion, when the ring was in Amina's keeping, the rebellious spirit Sakhr took on Solomon's form and obtained the ring. He then seated himself on the throne and ruled for forty days, during which time the real king wandered about the country, poor and forlorn. On the fortieth day, Sakhr dropped the ring into the sea; there it was swallowed by a fish, which was caught by a poor fisherman and given to Solomon for his supper. Solomon cut open the fish, found the ring, and returned to power. His forty days' exile had been sent in punishment for the idolatry practiced in his house for forty days, although unknown to him, by one of his wives".)

Hexagrams feature prominently in Jewish esoteric literature from the early medieval period, and it has been hypothesized that the tradition of Solomon's Seal may possibly predate Islam and date to early Rabbinical esoteric tradition, or to early alchemy in Hellenistic Judaism in 3rd century Egypt.

The seal appears profusely in the decoration of the 17th-century catholic Sacromonte Abbey, in Granada, Spain, as a symbol of wisdom. The Seal of Solomon was also discovered in Palestine during the Ottoman period, when it was etched in stone above windows and doors and on Muslim tombs. A few examples were found in houses in Saris and on graves in Jaffa.

An "Order of Solomon's Seal" was established in 1874 in Ethiopia, where the ruling house claimed descent from Solomon.

== Other traditions ==
In Islamic eschatology, some believe that the Beast of the Earth, which should appear near the Last Judgment day, will come bearing "the Seal of Solomon", and will use the latter to stamp the noses of the unbelievers (kāfir).

== Use in vexillology ==
Flag of Hayreddin Barbarossa, 16th century

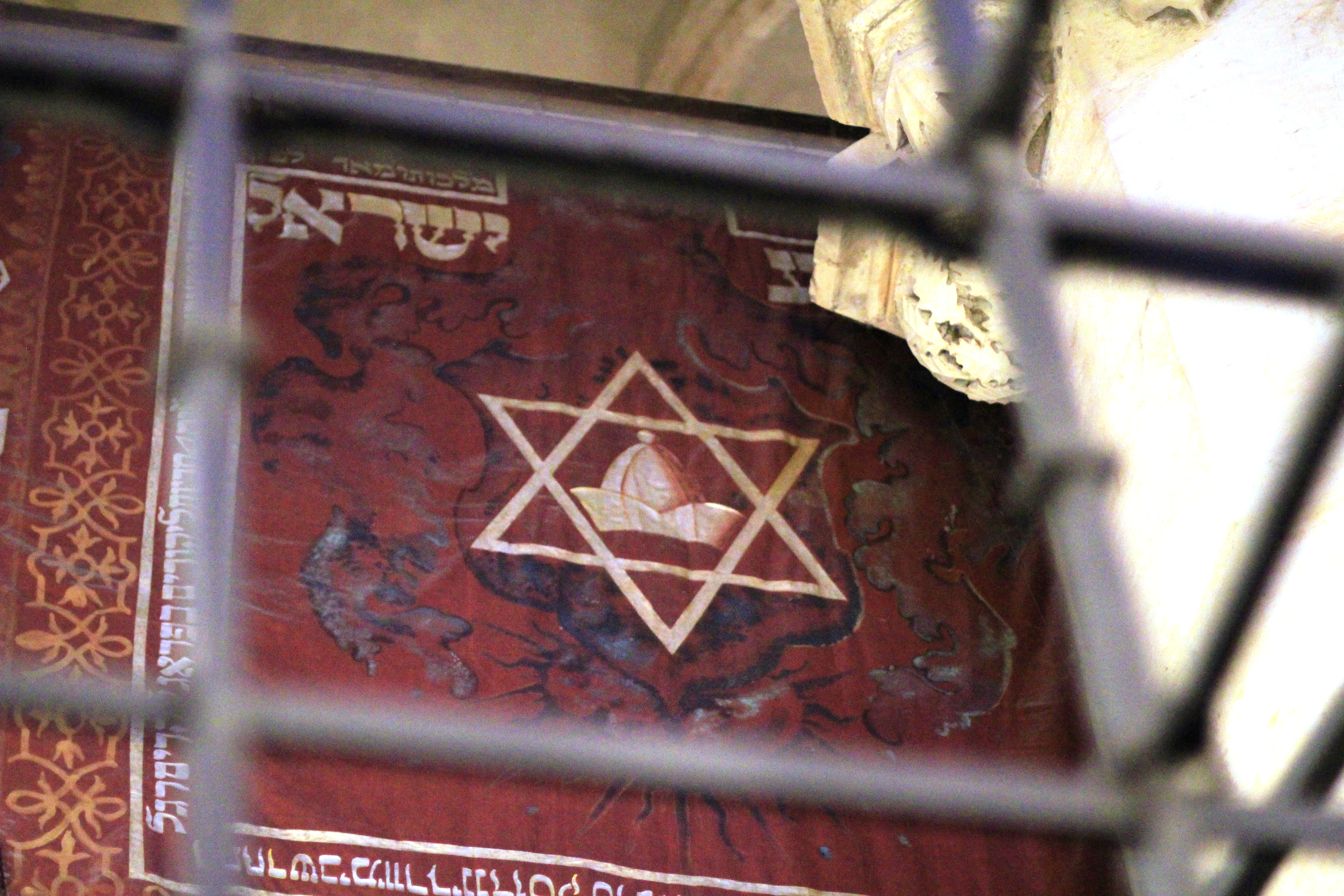
Historical flag of the Jewish community in Prague, 17th century

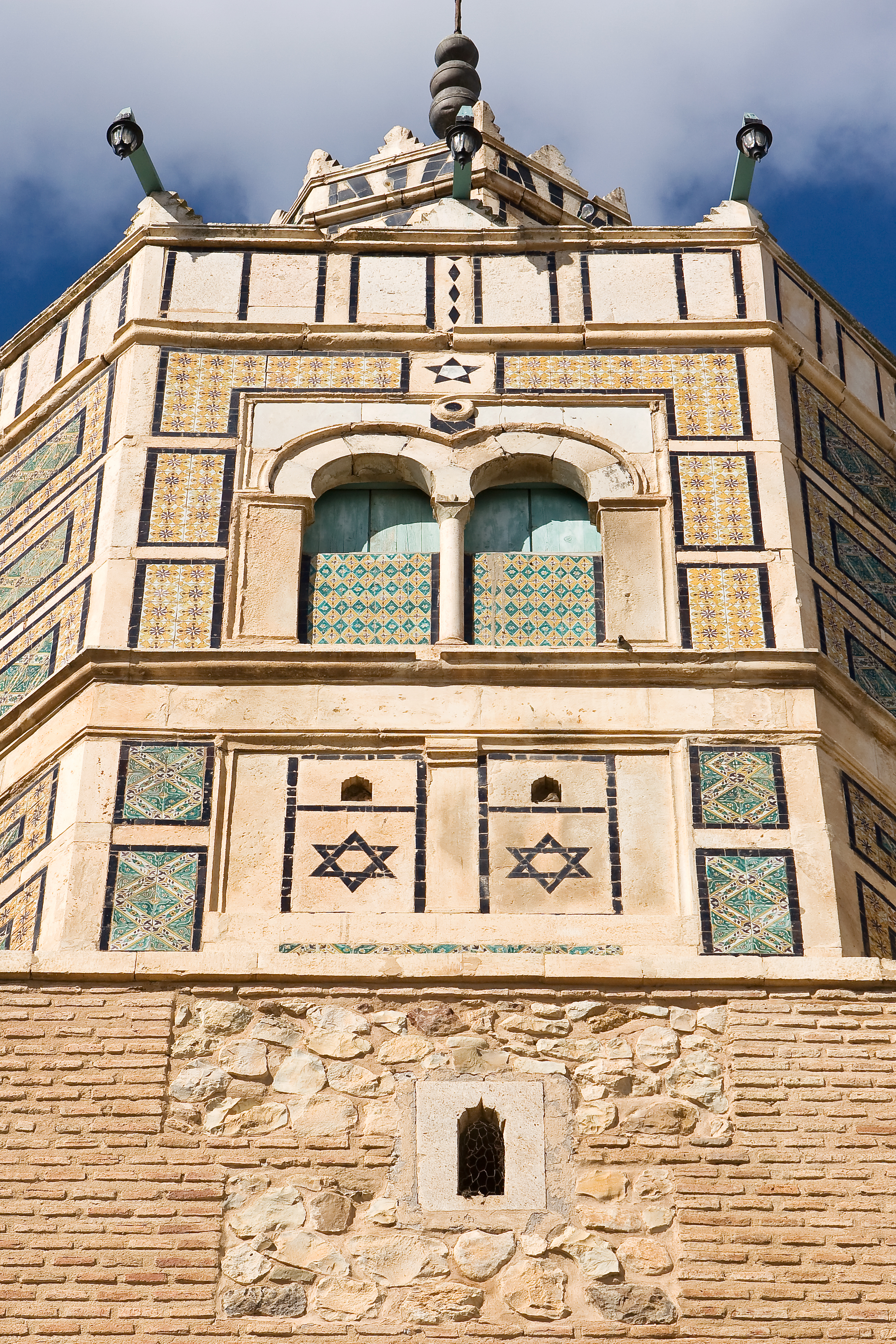
Minaret of the Great Mosque of Testour, Tunisia, 1631

Ethiopian imperial standard (obverse)

1914–1952 Flag of British Nigeria

1948 Flag of Israel

In 1354, King of Bohemia Charles IV prescribed for the Jews of Prague a red flag with both David's shield and Solomon's seal, while the red flag with which the Jews met King Matthias of Hungary in the 15th century showed two pentagrams with two golden stars.

The pentagram on the current flag of Morocco is meant to represent the Seal, as well as the five pillars of Islam.

The hexagram or Star of David, which became a symbol of Judaism in the modern period and was placed on the flag of Israel in 1948, has its origins in 14th-century depictions of the Seal of Solomon.

The flag of Hayreddin Barbarossa had a Seal of Solomon between the blades of a zulfiqar.

== In popular culture ==
Lippmann Moses Büschenthal (d. 1818) wrote a tragedy with the title Der Siegelring Salomonis ("the signet-ring of Solomon").

== See also ==
- Goetia
- Key of Solomon
- The Lesser Key of Solomon
- Polygonatum multiflorum, plant from the lily family named "Solomon's seal"
- Seal of Muhammad
- Sigil
- Solomon's knot
- Solomon's Seal (album)
- Testament of Solomon
- Star of David
- This too shall pass — adage often connected to Solomon's seal
