= Flag of Saint Kitts and Nevis =

Federation of Saint Kitts and Nevis
- Use: National flag, civil and state ensign
- Proportion: 2:3
- Adopted: 19 September 1983; 43 years ago
- Design: A yellow-edged black diagonal band bearing two white five-pointed stars reaching from the lower hoist-side corner to the upper fly-side corner: the upper triangle is green and the lower triangle is red.
- Designed by: Edrice Lewis
- Naval ensign of Saint Kitts and Nevis
- Use: Naval ensign
- Proportion: 1:2
- Design: A white field with a centered red cross, the national flag stretched out to a ratio of 1:2 is in the canton.
- Flag of the governor-general of Saint Kitts and Nevis
- Use: Flag of the Governor-General
- Proportion: 1:2
- Adopted: 19 September 1983
- Design: A lion statant guardant surmounted upon St Edward's Crown above a gold scroll inscribed with 'COUNTRY ABOVE SELF' on a blue field

Version with aspect ratio 1:2

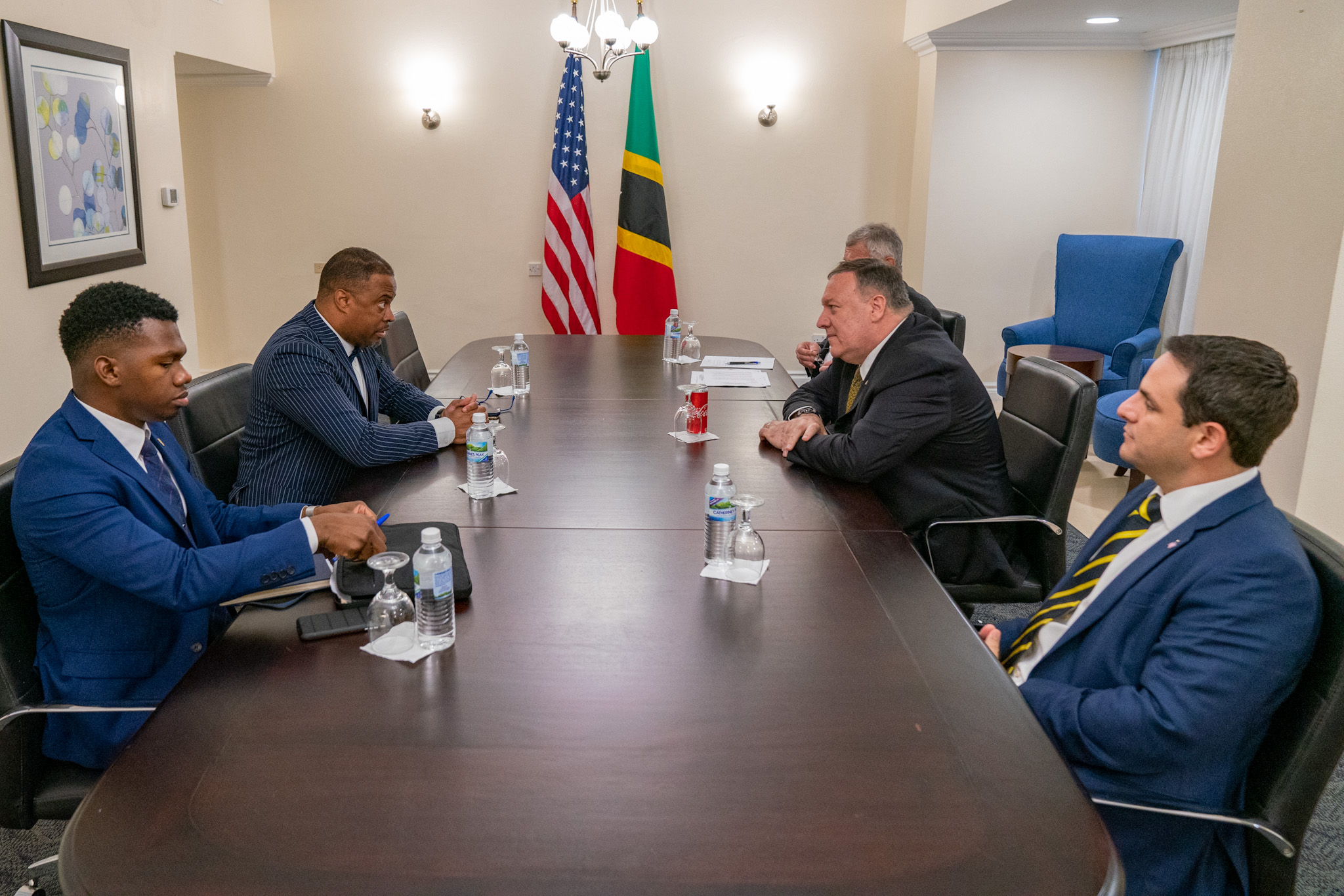
Meeting between American and Kittsian diplomats; Saint Kitts and Nevis flag in background

The national flag of Saint Kitts and Nevis consists of a yellow-edged black band containing two white stars that divides diagonally from the lower hoist-side corner, with a green upper triangle and red lower triangle. Adopted in 1983 to replace the flag of Saint Christopher-Nevis-Anguilla, it has been the flag of the Federation of Saint Kitts and Nevis since the country gained independence that year. Although the flag utilises the colours of the Pan-Africanist movement, the symbolism behind them is interpreted differently.

The islands of Anguilla, Nevis, and Saint Christopher formed a province of the West Indies Federation in 1958. After the federation dissolved four years later, they were granted the status of associate state as Saint Christopher-Nevis-Anguilla. However, Anguilla decided to secede from the federation in 1969, owing to fears that their population, which was already small, would be further marginalised in parliament. This was eventually formalised in 1980, and a new flag for the remaining parts of the federation was needed, since the symbolism of the previous flag centred on the concept of a union of three.

A national competition was held in the early 1980s to choose a new flag. The winning design by student Edrice Lewis was one of 258 entries. It was first hoisted one minute after midnight on 19 September 1983, the day Saint Kitts and Nevis became an independent country.

== Design ==
=== Symbolism ===
While the flag's design is nearly identical to that of The Republic of the Congo, its colours and symbols carry cultural, political, and regional meanings. The green alludes to the country's fertile land, while the red evokes the fight against slavery and colonialism. The yellow stripes represent the sunshine the islands enjoy all year round, and the black epitomises the people's African origins. The two stars on the black band symbolise the two islands as well as hope and liberty. The official meaning behind the flag's symbols was formulated by Edrice Lewis, the same person who designed the flag.

== Historical flags ==
| Flag | Duration | Use | Description |
|---|---|---|---|
| | 1871–1952 | Flag of the British Leeward Islands | |
| | 1952–1958 | Flag of the British Leeward Islands | |
| | 1958–1962 | Flag of the West Indies Federation | A blue field with four white horizontal wavy bars (the top pair of bars being parallel and the lower pair also parallel) and an orange sun in the centre. |
| | 1958–1967 | Flag of Saint Christopher-Nevis-Anguilla | |
| | 1967 | Flag of Saint Christopher-Nevis-Anguilla | A vertical tricolour of green, yellow and blue. |
| | 1967–1983 | Flag of Saint Christopher-Nevis-Anguilla | A vertical tricolour of green, yellow and blue charged with a palm tree at the centre. |

== Flag of Nevis ==
Flag of Nevis

The flag of Nevis reflects its identity within the Federation of Saint Kitts and Nevis through the inclusion of the national flag in the canton.

The golden field stands for sunshine. The central triangle represents the conical shape of Nevis, with the blue being the ocean; the green being the verdant slopes of the island; and the white being the clouds that usually wreathe Nevis Peak.

== Similar flags ==
- Flag of the Republic of the Congo
