= Flag of Antigua and Barbuda =

Antigua and Barbuda
- Use: National flag and civil ensign
- Proportion: 2:3
- Adopted: February 27, 1967; 59 years ago
- Design: A horizontal tri-colour of black, blue (half-width), and white, with two red right scalene triangles on opposite sides. On the black band is a yellow half-sun with nine rays
- Designed by: Sir Reginald Samuel
- Use: State ensign
- Proportion: 2:3
- Design: A white field with a red cross, the national flag in the canton

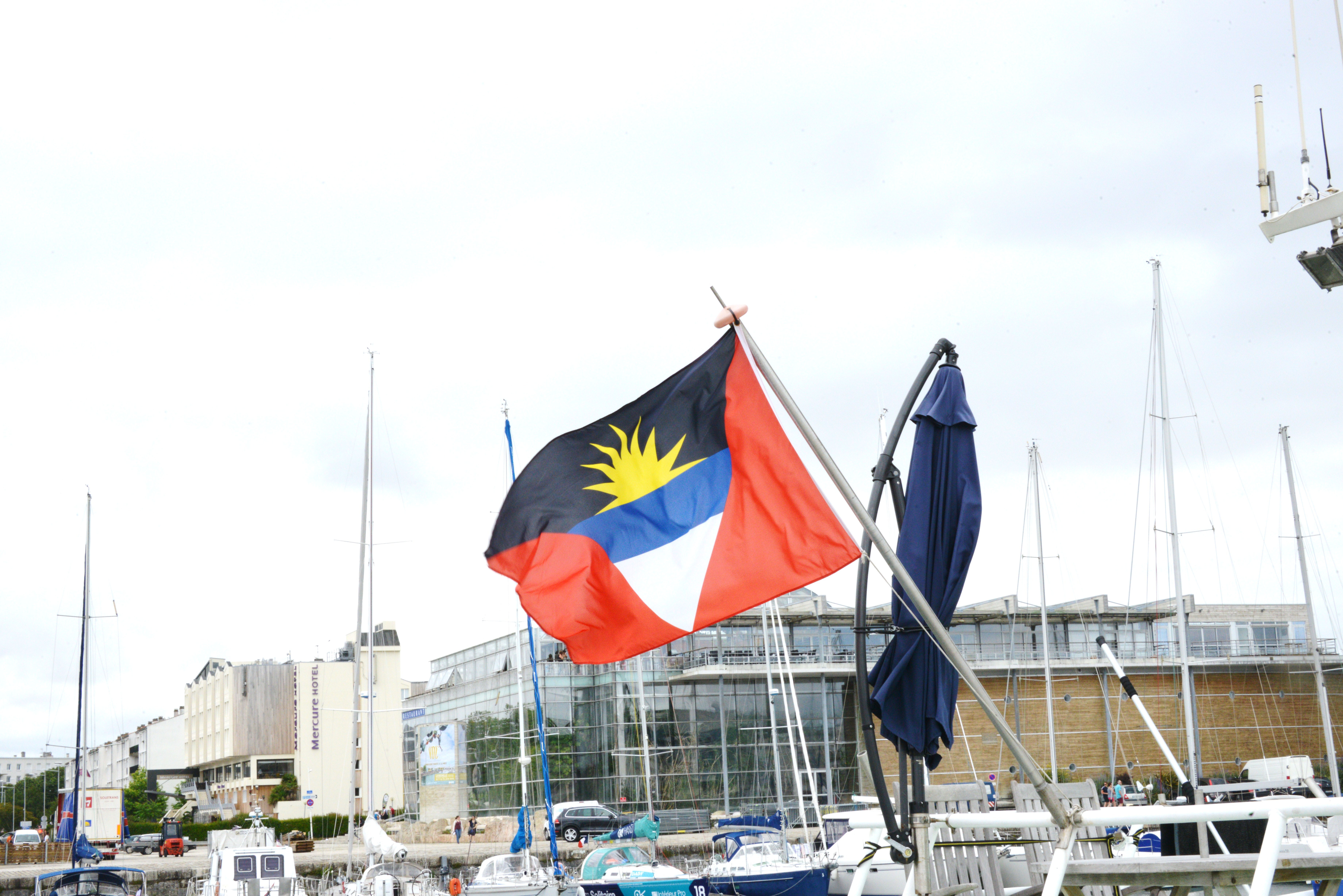
Antigua and Barbuda flag on a pleasure craft

The national flag of Antigua and Barbuda was adopted on 27 February 1967 to mark the achievement of self-government. A competition to design the flag was held in which more than 600 local people entered. The winning design was put forth by nationally well-known artist and sculptor Sir Reginald Samuel.

== Design and symbolism ==
The design is a red field with an inverted isosceles triangle based on the top edge of the field pointed toward the bottom edge of the field bearing the horizontal tricolour of black, light blue (half width) and white with the rising sun centred on top of the black band. The rising sun symbolises the dawning of a new era.

The colours have different meanings: the black is for the African ancestry of the people; the blue for hope; and the red for energy or life of the people. The successive colouring of black, yellow, blue, and white (from the sun down) also stands for the soil, sun, sea, and sand. The blue also represents the Caribbean Sea, and the V-shape is the symbol of victory. The seven points on the flag represent each of the six parishes and the island of Barbuda.

The state ensign, which is used only by the national coast guard, consists of a white field, a red cross, and the state flag in the canton.

== History ==
=== Pre-1967 ===
From the beginning of European settlement on the islands in the 1630s, the flags of England (pre 1707), Great Britain (1707–1800), United Kingdom (1801–1871), British Leeward Islands (1871–1958) and West Indies Federation (1958–1962) were used over the islands. The first flag representing the territory of the present-day nation was created in the late 1950s, at which time Antigua and Barbuda were reorganized into a province of the West Indies Federation. This flag consists of a Blue Ensign defaced with the coat of arms. The coat of arms depicted the landscape of the island with an aloe-plant on the shore and a sugar mill on a hill. It is not known exactly when the coat of arms was developed, however, since 1909 this design has been used to represent Antigua on the larger coat of arms of the British Leeward Islands. The Blue Ensign defaced with the local coat of arms is the common design on colonial flags throughout the British Empire, adopted by all the other provinces of the West Indies Federation. The original flag design included a white circle behind the coat of arms, but this element disappeared over time.

Flag (1956–1962)

Flag (1962–1967)

=== History of the current flag ===
The flag based on the Blue Ensign was replaced by the current design on 27 February 1967. This was 11 days after royal assent to the West Indies Act 1967, which changed the status of the islands from British colonies to states in free association with the United Kingdom. The flag adopted at that time was the design of Sir Reginald Samuel, which had won a public competition. Apparently it was one of the last projects admitted to the competition. After gaining full independence on 1 November 1981, the flag was retained.

== Other flags ==
=== Governor-General ===
Flag	Date	Use	Description
	2023–present	Flag of the Governor-General	A lion standing atop a Tudor Crown, over a scroll inscribed "Antigua and Barbuda"
	1981–2023	Flag of the Governor-General	A lion standing atop a St Edward's Crown, over a scroll inscribed "Antigua and Barbuda"
	1967–1981	Flag of the Governor	A Union Flag defaced with a local coat of arms
	1956–1967	Flag of the Administrator	A Union Flag defaced with an old local coat of arms

=== Military ===
Flag	Date	Use	Description
	2023–present	Flag of the Chief of Defence Staff	
	?–2023	Flag of the Chief of Defence Staff	
	?–present	Flag of the Antigua and Barbuda Defence Force	
	?–present	Flag of the Antigua and Barbuda Regiment	

=== Customs Service ===
Flag	Date	Use	Description
	?–present	Flag of the Customs and Excise Division	White flag with emblem

=== Antigua and Barbuda Search and Rescue ===
Flag	Date	Use	Description
	?–present	Flag of Antigua and Barbuda Search and Rescue.	White triangle burgee with red lifebuoy.

=== Barbuda ===
Flag	Date	Use	Description
	2018–present	Flag of the Barbuda Council	Barbuda Flag of Self-Determination
	1997–2018	Flag of the Barbuda Council	

=== Yacht clubs ===
Burgee	Club
	Antigua Yacht Club
