= Flag of the British Leeward Islands =

- Use: National flag
- Adopted: 1871 (with a Tudor Crown), 1952 (with a St Edward's Crown)
- Relinquished: 1958
- Design: A British Blue Ensign defaced with the colony badge.
- Designed by: Sir Benjamin Pine
- Flag of the Governor of the British Leeward Islands
- Adopted: 1874 (with a Tudor Crown), 1952 (with a St Edward's Crown)
- Relinquished: 31 December 1959

The flag of the British Leeward Islands was the flag of the Federal Colony of the Leeward Islands. It was a Blue Ensign with a badge. The colonies under the Federal Colony had their own badges from 1909. The Governor-in-chief of the Leeward Islands used a Union Flag defaced with the coat of arms. The badge depicted two white ships sailing in opposite directions through the straits. In the foreground was a pineapple, with three smaller ones behind it, as the fruit was an important product of island agriculture. The coat of arms of Great Britain appeared above the scene.

The flag was adopted in 1871 when Sir Benjamin Pine was governor; a rumour stated the large pineapple represented him and the smaller ones represented his family (as a form of canting). The flag was in use for 85 years until the federation was dissolved following the annexation of most of its islands to the larger West Indies Federation in 1958. The only change came in 1952 when the Queen Elizabeth II requested the Tudor Crown in all official British symbols be replaced with St. Edward's Crown, which she wore at her coronation.

Flag during the reign of Elizabeth II (1952-1958)

Flag of the governor during the reign of Elizabeth II (1952-1959 (Note: The office of governor was officially abolished on 31 December 1959, although the territory had been abolished two years earlier.))

== See also ==
- Former parts of the Leeward Islands
  - Flag of Antigua and Barbuda
  - Flag of the British Virgin Islands
  - Flag of Dominica
  - Flag of Montserrat
  - Flag of Saint Christopher-Nevis-Anguilla
    - Flag of Saint Kitts and Nevis
    - Flag of Anguilla
- Flag of the British Windward Islands
- Flag of the West Indies Federation
