= Lippmann Moses Büschenthal =

Franco-German rabbi, poet and dramatist

Lippmann Moses Büschenthal (12 May 1782 – 27 December 1818) was a Franco-German rabbi, poet and dramatist of the Haskalah movement. He was born in the Alsatian town of Bischheim, near Strasbourg, on 12 May 1782. In 1799, he married Debora Auerbach, granddaughter of Rabbi David Sinzheim, with whom he had four children (they would later divorce in 1813). After a short stay in Paris (1807), he left Alsace for Germany, settling first in Neuwied and then Elberfeld, where he worked as a newspaper editor. He then lived in Vienna and Breslau, before finally settling in Berlin shortly before his death.

Büschenthal published mainly poetry in Hebrew and German, and one dramatic work. He composed psalms in Hebrew for the Jewish community of Strasbourg in 1801 on the occasion of an attempt on Napoleon's life, and in 1803 on the occasion of the war against England. Many of his works were published in the journals Sulamith, Jedidja and Rheinische Blätter. A collection of short tales was published posthumously.

== Bibliography ==
- "Der Mensch". Sulamith. 1 (2): 1–3. 1807. Archived from the original on 2007-09-28.
- "Das Licht". Sulamith. 1 (2): 81–82. 1807. Archived from the original on 2007-09-28.
- "Eine Vision Siona's". Sulamith. 1 (2): 164–169. 1807. Archived from the original on 2007-09-28. With W. Heidenheim.
- "Der Tod Sauls oder die Hexe zu Endor. Dramatisches Gedicht in fünf Aufzügen". Sulamith. 2 (2): 262–276. 1809. Archived from the original on 2007-09-28.
- "Allerlei". Sulamith. 2 (2): 361–363. 1809. Archived from the original on 2007-09-28.
- "Das Schiff". Sulamith. 2 (2): 363. 1809. Archived from the original on 2007-09-28.
- "Allerlei". Sulamith. 2 (2): 425–427. 1809. Archived from the original on 2007-09-28.
- "Der Kuß". Sulamith. 2 (2): 428. 1809. Archived from the original on 2007-09-28.
- "Der Springball". Sulamith. 2 (2): 428. 1809. Archived from the original on 2007-09-28.
- Skizze über deutsche Orthographie und Prosodie. Elberfeld. 1811.
- Sammlung witziger Einfälle von Juden: als Beyträge zur Characteristik der Jüdischen Nation [Collection of witty notions about Jews, as a contribution to the characterization of the Jewish nation]. Elberfeld. 1812.
- Büschenthal, L. M. (1806). Gedichte. Rödelheim.
- Hebrew translation of Friedrich Schiller's An die Freude. Berlin. 1817.
- Preface to Sabbattia Joseph Wolff's Streifereien im Gebiete des Ernstes und des Scherzes. Berlin. 1818.
- Gebilde der Wahrheit und Phantasie. Magdeburg. 1819.
- Der Siegelring des Salomo. Berlin. 1820. Tragedy in five acts.
- Erzählungen. Magdeburg. 1823.
