= Coat of arms of the British Windward Islands =

Badge of the Governor-in-chief of the Windward Islands

Versions
- Version used from 1886 to 1903

- Version used from 1903 to 1953
- Armiger: Governor-in-chief of the Windward Islands
- Adopted: 1886; 1903; 1953
- Crest: St Edward's Crown
- Shield: Quarterly: Gules, Or, Vert and Sable
- Compartment: A blue disc, surrounded by a garter with the inscription "GOVERNOR IN CHIEF" and "WINDWARD ISLANDS"
- Motto: I PEDE FAUSTO "Go with a lucky foot"

The coat of arms of the Governor-in-chief of the British Windward Islands was adopted in 1886.

== See also ==
- Flag of the British Windward Islands
- Coat of arms of the British Leeward Islands
