= List of Bahamian flags =

This is a list of flags that have been used in the Commonwealth of The Bahamas.

== National flag ==
Flag	Date	Use	Description
	1973–present	Flag of the Bahamas	A black equilateral triangle based at the hoist represents the unity and determination of the people of the Bahamas. The triangle is oriented toward three equal-width stripes symbolising areas of natural resource; two aquamarine stripes at the top and bottom of the flag representing the Caribbean Sea and one gold stripe representing the sandy beaches.
	1973–present	Flag of the Bahamas (vertical)	

== Royal and viceregal flags ==
Flag	Date	Use	Description
	1973–	Flag of the governor-general of the Bahamas	A lion standing on a St. Edward's crown, with the name "Commonwealth of The Bahamas" below.
	1973–2022	Personal flag of Queen Elizabeth II	The flag is the crowned letter 'E' in gold, surrounded by a garland of gold roses on a blue background, with a golden fringe. The crown is a symbol of the Queen's rank and dignity, whilst the roses symbolise the countries of the Commonwealth.

== Government flags ==
Flag	Date	Use	Description
	1973–	Flag of the Prime Minister	Same as the national flag but is charged with a gold parliamentary mace placed vertically in the fly.
	1973–	Parliament of the Bahamas	
	1973–	Senate of the Bahamas	

== Other flags ==
Flag	Date	Use	Description
	1973–	Civil ensign of the Bahamas	
	1973–	Civil jack of the Bahamas	
	1973–	Naval ensign of the Bahamas	
	1973–	Auxiliary ensign of the Bahamas	

== Political flags ==
Flag	Date	Party	Description
	1973–1977	Flag of the Abaco Independence Movement	
Link to file		Progressive Liberal Party	Party logo on yellow background

== Historical flags ==
Flag	Date	Use	Description
	1706–1718	Informal flag of the Republic of Pirates	Jolly Roger
	1869–1904	Flag of the Crown Colony of the Bahama Islands	A British Blue Ensign with the Badge of the Bahama islands.
	1869–1904	Civil ensign of the Crown Colony of the Bahama Islands	A British Red Ensign with the Badge of the Bahama islands.
	1869–1904	Flag of the governor of the Bahama Islands	A British Union Flag with the Badge of the Bahama Islands.
	1904–1923	Flag of the Crown Colony of the Bahama Islands	A British Blue Ensign with the Badge of the Bahama Islands. Note: change in the design of the crown within the badge.
	1904–1923	Civil ensign of the Crown Colony of the Bahama Islands	A British Red Ensign with the Badge of the Bahama Islands. Note: change in the design of the crown within the badge.
	1923–1953	Flag of the Crown Colony of the Bahama Islands	A British Blue Ensign with the Badge of the Bahama Islands. Note: change in the design of the badge.
	1923–1953	Civil ensign of the Crown Colony of the Bahama Islands	A British Red Ensign with the Badge of the Bahama Islands. Note: change in the design of the badge.
	1904–1953	Flag of the governor of the Bahama Islands	A British Union Flag with the Badge of the Bahama Islands. Note: change in the design of the badge.
	1953–1964	Flag of the Crown Colony of the Bahama Islands	A British Blue Ensign with the Badge of the Bahama Islands. Note: change in the design of the crown within the badge.
	1953–1964	Civil ensign of the Crown Colony of the Bahama Islands	A British Red Ensign with the Badge of the Bahama Islands. Note: change in the design of the crown within the badge.
	1953–1964	Flag of the governor of the Bahama Islands	A British Union Flag with the Badge of the Bahama Islands. Note: change in the design of the badge.
	1964–1973	Flag of the Crown Colony of the Bahama Islands	A British Blue Ensign with the Badge of the Bahama Islands. Note: change in the design of the crown within the badge.
	1964–1973	Civil ensign of the Crown Colony of the Bahama Islands	A British Red Ensign with the Badge of the Bahama Islands. Note: change in the design of the crown within the badge.
	1964–1973	Flag of the governor of the Bahama Islands	A British Union Flag with the Badge of the Bahama Islands. Note: change in the design of the badge.
	1973–2006	Flag of The Bahamas	A horizontal triband of aquamarine (top and bottom) and gold with a black equilateral triangle aligned to the hoist-side. Despite being superseded by the standardised variant, it remains widely used to this day unofficially.

== Proposed flags ==
Flag	Date	Use	Description
	1973	Original flag proposal	

== Yacht clubs of Bahamas ==
Flag	Club
	Nassau Yacht Club
	Royal Nassau Sailing Club
