= Flag of Malaya (1896–1950) =

Former national flag

1:2. Flag of Malaya (1896–1950).

Naval ensign of the Federated Malay States (1896-1946)

The flag of the Federated Malay States (1896–1946), the Malayan Union (1946–1948) and the Federation of Malaya (1948–1950) represented the union of the four Malay states of Selangor, Perak, Negeri Sembilan and Pahang in a federation as a protectorate under the British Crown.

The flag was striped horizontally with an overall 1:2 to ratio with white stripe at the top, red, yellow and black at the bottom. In the center was a white oval, with a horizontal major axis, and a Malayan tiger (Malay: Harimau Malaya) leaping, face to the left.

In addition to a state flag, the Federated Malay States also had a naval ensign. The ensign, with the four colors of the FMS, was flown by HMS Malaya (commanded by Captain Boyle under the 5th Battle Squadron of the British Grand Fleet) during the Battle of Jutland, where it was said to make Malaya resemble "an enraged P&O," due to the ensign's resemblance to the house flag of the shipping line.

The colors and the four stripes represented the four states of the federation. The colors white, red, yellow and black represented the colors used in the flag of the four states;

- Red and yellow for Selangor (white was added in 1965)
- White, yellow and black for Perak
- Red, black and yellow for Negeri Sembilan
- White and black for Pahang

Flag of the states in the FMS (1896-1946)
Flag	State	Remark
	Selangor	In use until 1965
	Perak	
	Negeri Sembilan	
	Pahang	In use from 1903

== See also ==
- Flag of Malaysia
- Federated Malay States
- Selangor
- Perak
- Negeri Sembilan
- Pahang
- Malayan Union
- Federation of Malaya
