= Coat of arms of Malawi =

National symbol

- Armiger: Republic of Malawi
- Adopted: 1964
- Crest: Water Barry wavy Azure and Argent in front of a sun rising Or a fish eagle rising proper; A Helmet Argent with Mantling Gules and Or
- Torse: Or and Gules
- Shield: Per Fess Barry wavy Azure and Argent; A Fess Gules a lion passant Or; In base Sable a sun rising Or
- Supporters: On the dexter side, a lion, and On the sinister side, a leopard both guardant
- Compartment: Upon a compartment representing the Mulanje mountain proper
- Motto: UNITY AND FREEDOM
- Earlier version(s): earlier heraldic arms of Nyasaland

The coat of arms of Malawi is based on the earlier heraldic arms of Nyasaland. It is supported by a lion and a leopard, above a scroll reading "Unity and Freedom". A rising sun in a black field, like in the lower field in the shield, is also present in the flag of Malawi.

== Blazon ==
The Coat of Arms of Malawi are described as follows:

For Arms, per fess barry wavy Azure and Argent and Sable on a fess Gules a lion passant and in base a sun rising or: and for the Crest: On a wreath or and Gules on water barry wavy Azure and Argent in front of a sun rising or a fish eagle rising proper, and for Supporters: On the dexter side a lion and on the sinister side a leopard both guardant, upon a compartment representing the Mlanje mountain proper, together with this motto: Unity and Freedom.

== Gallery ==
British Central Africa Protectorate 1893–1907

Nyasaland 1914–1925

Nyasaland 1925–1964

Federation of Rhodesia and Nyasaland 1953–1963
