= Flag of the British Windward Islands =

Flag of the British Windward Islands

The flag of the British Windward Islands was the flag of the Federal Colony of the Windward Islands. It was a Blue Ensign with the badge of the Governor-in-chief in the fly. The separate colonies under the Federal Colony each had their own ensigns. In 1903, the shape of the crown on the badge was changed slightly. The Governor-in-chief of the Windward Islands used a Union Flag defaced with the badge.

The Federal Colony of the Windward Islands became the Territory of the Windward Islands in June 1956, and was dissolved in 1958.

== Gallery ==
=== Historical flags ===
Flag used from 1833 to 1886

Flag used from 1886 to 1903

Flag used from 1903 to 1953

Flag used from 1953 to 1958

=== Standard of the Governor-in-chief ===
1886–1903

1903–1953

1953–1960 (Note: The office of governor-in-chief was officially abolished on 1 January 1960, although the territory had been abolished two years earlier.)

== See also ==
- Former parts of Windward Islands
  - Flag of Grenada
  - Flag of Saint Lucia
  - Flag of Saint Vincent and the Grenadines
  - Flag of Dominica
- Flag of the West Indies Federation
- Flag of the British Leeward Islands
