= Coat of arms of Solomon Islands =

- Armiger: Solomon Islands
- Adopted: c.1978
- Crest: On a helmet guardant, lambrequined Argent and Azure, a Solomon Islands war canoe proper and a Sun radiant Or
- Torse: Argent and azure
- Shield: Or, a Saltire Vert charged with two spears in saltire, points in base and a bow and two arrows charged with a native shield in fess point, between two Turtles all proper, and on a chief Azure an Eagle sejant on a branch between two Frigate birds all proper
- Supporters: On the dexter, a Crocodile, and on the sinister a Shark, both proper
- Compartment: A stylised two-headed Frigate bird Sable
- Motto: To Lead Is to Serve

The coat of arms of Solomon Islands shows a shield which is framed by a crocodile and a shark. The motto is displayed under it, which reads "To Lead Is to Serve". Over the shield there is a helmet with decorations, crowned by a stylised sun.

== Historical coat of arms ==
Solomon Islands badge (1906–1947)

Solomon Islands badge (1947–1956)

Solomon Islands badge (1956–1978)
