= Coat of arms of the British Leeward Islands =

The badge of the British Leeward Islands was adopted in the 1870s.

The Royal arms on the top of the badge was a non-classical design.

A coat of arms was adopted in 1909. The arms combined the devices used on the public seals of each of the colony's presidencies, with Antigua and Dominica in chief, St Kitts and Nevis in the fess point, and Montserrat and the Virgin Islands in base. The crest was a pineapple.

Badge of the British Leeward Islands, which featured on the colony's flag from 1871 to 1952.

Badge of the British Leeward Islands, which featured on the colony's flag from 1952 to 1958.

Coat of arms of the British Leeward Islands from 1909 to 1940.

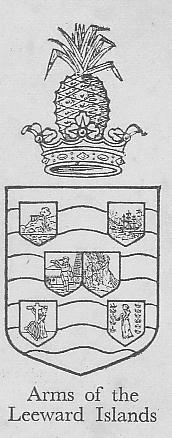

Coat of arms of the British Leeward Islands from 1940 to 1956, after Dominica was transferred to the British Windward Islands.

== See also ==
- Coat of arms of the British Windward Islands
