= British Windward Islands =

1833–1958 British colonial division in the Caribbean

- 1833–1958
- Flag Badge
- Motto: I pede fausto (Latin: Go with a lucky foot)
- Anthem: God Save the King (1833–1837; 1901–1952); God Save the Queen (1837–1901; 1952–1958)
- Status: British colony
- Capital: Bridgetown, Barbados (1871–1885); St George's, Grenada (1885–1958)
- Common languages: English; English-based creole languages; Dominican Creole French; Saint Lucian Creole French
- Religion: Christianity (Anglican, Catholic, Methodist, Presbyterian)
- Government: Constitutional monarchy
- Monarch
  - 1833–1837 (first): William IV
  - 1952–1958 (last): Elizabeth II
- Governor-in-chief
  - 1833–1836 (first): Lionel Smith
  - 1955–1960 (Note: The office of governor-in-chief was officially abolished on 1 January 1960, although the territory had been abolished two years earlier.) (last): Colville Deverell
- History
  - Established: 1833
  - Federation: 1871
  - Barbados left: 1885
  - Tobago left: 1889
  - Dominica joined: 1940
  - Overseas Territory: 1956
  - Disestablished: 3 January 1958
- Currency: Pound sterling (official); Spanish dollar, Mexican peso also used
Preceded by
Barbados
Dominica
Grenada
Saint Lucia
Saint Vincent
Grenadines
Tobago
Succeeded by
Barbados
Trinidad and Tobago
West Indies Federation

The British Windward Islands was an administrative grouping of British colonies in the Windward Islands of the West Indies, existing from 1833 until 3 January 1958 and consisting of the islands of Grenada, Saint Lucia, Saint Vincent, the Grenadines, Barbados (the seat of the governor until 1885, when it returned to its former status of a completely separate colony), Tobago (until 1889, when it was joined to Trinidad), and (from 1940) Dominica, previously included in the British Leeward Islands.

== Administrative history ==
The seat of government was Bridgetown on Barbados, from 1871 to 1885, and thereafter St. George's on Grenada. The islands were not a single colony, but a confederation of separate colonies with a common governor-in-chief, while each island retained its own institutions. The Windward Islands had neither legislature, laws, revenue nor tariff in common. However, there was a common audit system, while the islands united in maintaining certain institutions of general utility.

Tobago had been a dependency of the Windward Islands from 1814 until it united with Trinidad on 1 January 1889.

== Judicial history ==
In 1859, a common court of appeal for the group was established, composed of the chief justices of the respective island colonies. Under the West Indian Court of Appeal Act 1919 this court was replaced by the West Indian Court of Appeal, responsible for appeals from not only the Windward Islands but also the Federal Colony of the Leeward Islands, Barbados, Trinidad and Tobago, and British Guiana.

In 1939 the Windward and Leeward Islands Supreme Court and the Windward and Leeward Islands Court of Appeal were established, which was replaced in 1967 by the Eastern Caribbean Supreme Court which provides both functions.

Chief justices of the Windward and Leeward Islands

- 1940–1942 James Henry Jarrett
- 1943–1950 Sir Clement Malone
- 1950–1957 Sir Donald Jackson
- 1958–1963 Sir Cyril George Xavier Henriques
- 1963–?1967 Frank E. Field

== See also ==
- List of governors of the Windward Islands
- History of the British West Indies
- Windward Islands
- British Leeward Islands
- Windward Islands cricket team
- Commonwealth Caribbean
