= Flag of Nigeria (1914–1960) =

Former flag of Nigeria

Colony and Protectorate of Nigeria
- Use: Civil and state flag, state ensign
- Adopted: 1952 (earlier version in 1914)
- Relinquished: 1960
- Design: Blue Ensign with a green six-pointed star described as the Seal of Solomon, surrounding St Edward's Crown with the white word "Nigeria" under it on a red disc
- Civil ensign of Nigeria
- Adopted: 1952 (earlier version in 1914)
- Relinquished: 1960
- Design: Red Ensign with a green six-pointed star described as the Seal of Solomon, surrounding St Edward's Crown with the white word "Nigeria"
- Flag of the governor-general of Nigeria
- Adopted: 1952 (earlier version in 1914)
- Relinquished: 1960
- Design: A Union Flag defaced with the coat of arms.

The flag of Nigeria between 1914 and 1960 was a British Blue Ensign with a green six-pointed star described as the Seal of Solomon, surrounding a Tudor Crown (changed to St Edward's Crown in 1953) with the white word "Nigeria" under it on a red disc. It was adopted by the Colony and Protectorate of Nigeria following the amalgamation of the Southern Nigeria Protectorate and Northern Nigeria Protectorate.

== History ==
The colonial flag of Nigeria was adopted in 1914 following the amalgamation of Southern Nigeria and Northern Nigeria. The badge on the flag was also used on the flag of the governor-general of Nigeria.

In April 1940, former colonial governor-general Frederick Lugard explained the green hexagram on the flag:

"The design of the interlaced triangles is I think commonly called Solomon's Seal. I do not know if and when it was adopted as the seal of Islam but it was found on the lid of a very handsome goblet or jug of brass and copper covered with designs, which was captured by the troops when the Emir of Kontagora, the principle slave-raider in Northern Nigeria was defeated. I thought it an appropriate badge for Northern Nigeria and as far as I can remember it was my own suggestion. On amalgamation of North and South it was adopted as the emblem of united Nigeria."

The flag was not universally accepted. In 1959, prior to Nigerian independence, a competition to design a new flag was held with Taiwo Akinkunmi designing the new flag of Nigeria which replaced the colonial flag in 1960.

Flags of Nigeria (1914–1952)
Flag of Nigeria (1914–1952)

Civil ensign of Nigeria (1914–1952)

Flag of the governor-general of Nigeria (1914–1952)

== See also ==
- Flag of Nigeria
