= Flag of the West Indies Federation =

- Use: National flag
- Proportion: 1:2
- Adopted: 1958
- Relinquished: 1962
- Design: Four equally spaced narrow white stripes with a large orange-gold circle over the middle two lines in the center of the flag, undulating horizontally across a blue field.
- Designed by: Edna Manley
- Use: Naval Ensign
- Adopted: 1958
- Relinquished: 1962

Flag of the governor-general.

The flag of the West Indies Federation was used between 1958 and 1962. It bore four equally spaced narrow white stripes with a large orange-gold circle over the middle two lines in the center of the flag, undulating horizontally across a blue field representing the Caribbean Sea and the sun shining upon the waves. The flag was originally designed by Edna Manley. The flag is shown as 1:2; the upper two white stripes reflect the lower ones.

The official description given in the West Indies Gazette is "Flag approved has blue ground with four white horizontal wavy bars (the top pair of bars being parallel and the lower pair also parallel) and an orange sun in the centre." "Blue", unless qualified, usually means the same blue as in a Blue Ensign. However, whatever the establishing resolution called for, many copies were made that were at variance with it, as variants often show a pale blue or Imperial blue field.

The naval ensign (used by coast guard vessels) was a British white ensign with the federal flag in the canton.

Flag flying days were Commemorative Days-the usual British flag flying days, and Federal Days-January 3, Inception of the Federation; February 23, Federation Day; and April 22, Inauguration of the Federal Parliament. Buildings with two flagstaffs were to fly the Union Jack and the Federation Flag on Commemorative Days and on Federal Days; the Union Jack at the staff on the left when facing the building. Buildings with only one staff were to fly the Union Jack on Commemorative Days and the Federation Flag on Federal Days.

Video clips of the flag at the 1960 Summer Olympics appear to show a red or bronze disc, lighter blue and the flag is symmetrical about both axes. The flag of the West Indies Federation was flown at the cricket test match between Australia and the West Indies held in Barbados in 1999. Despite the dissolution of the Federation in the 1960s and some countries and territories not being part of the Federation, the Caribbean nations compete together as one West Indies cricket team, but under a different flag.

== Provinces flags ==
Antigua (1956–1962)

Antigua (1962–1967)

Barbados

Cayman Islands (attached to Jamaica)

Dominica

Grenada

Jamaica (1957–1962)

Jamaica (1962)

Montserrat (1909–1960)

Montserrat (1960–1999)

Saint Christopher-Nevis-Anguilla

Saint Lucia

Saint Vincent and the Grenadines

Trinidad and Tobago (1889–1958)

Trinidad and Tobago (1958–1962)

Turks and Caicos Islands (attached to Jamaica)

== See also ==
- List of flags of the United Kingdom
- Flag of the British Leeward Islands
- Flag of the British Windward Islands
