= Flag of Saint Christopher-Nevis-Anguilla =

Flags of the British colony, 1958 to 1983

Flag of Saint Christopher-Nevis-Anguilla from 1967 to 1980, and the flag of Saint Christopher and Nevis from 1980 to 1983

Historically, there were various flags of Saint Christopher-Nevis-Anguilla. The "triple palm" flag, the last version, was introduced in 1967.

Flag of Saint Christopher-Nevis-Anguilla from 1958 to 1967

The "triple palm" flag consists of three vertical stripes of green (representing Saint Kitts), yellow (representing Nevis) and blue (representing Anguilla) while the tree was a coconut palm tree with three roots and three fronds, symbolising the destiny, humility, and pride of the three islands.

Anguilla and Saint Kitts and Nevis each adopted their own flags when St Kitts and Nevis became an independent country in 1983. Anguilla became a separate British Crown colony (now a British overseas territory).

== Gallery ==
Flag of the Administrator of Saint Christopher-Nevis-Anguilla from 1958 to 1967

Flag of Saint Christopher-Nevis-Anguilla for a brief period in 1967

Flag of the Governor of Saint Christopher-Nevis-Anguilla from 1967 to 1980

Flag of the Governor of Saint Christopher and Nevis from 1980 to 1983

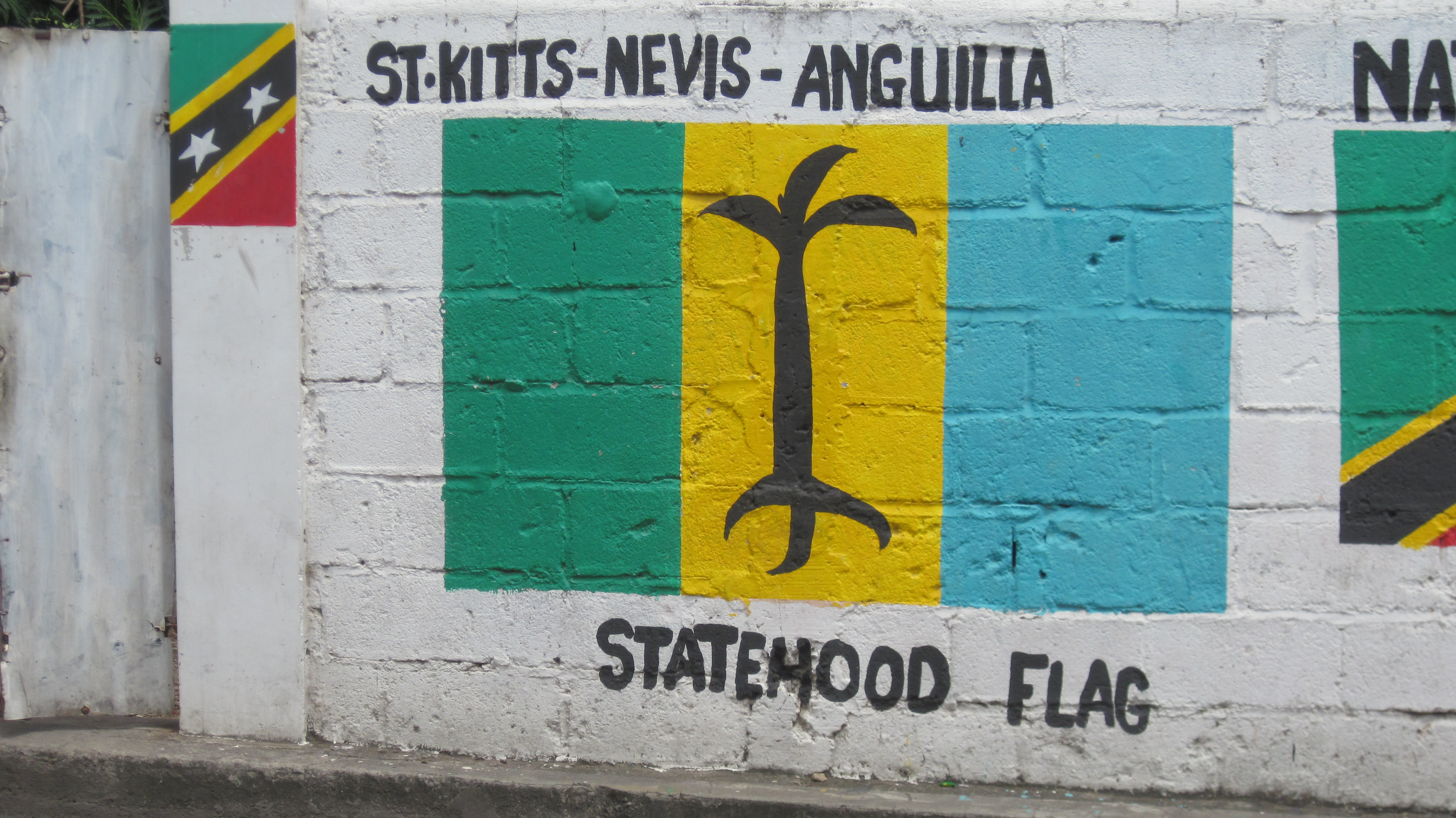
Mural of the triple-palm flag, St Kitts

== See also ==
- Flag of the British Leeward Islands
- Flag of the West Indies Federation
- Flag of Anguilla
- Flag of Saint Kitts and Nevis
