= Flag of the United States of the Ionian Islands =

United States of the Ionian Islands
- Proportion: 1:2
- Adopted: 1815
- Relinquished: 1864
- Design: A red bordered-Blue Ensign with a gold Lion of Saint Mark holding a Bible and seven bundled arrows

The Flag of the United States of the Ionian Islands was used between 1815 and 1864. The flag consisted of a Blue Ensign with the coat of arms of the predecessor state, the Septinsular Republic on it with a red border.

== History ==
The United States of the Ionian Islands were created as a result of the Treaty of Paris in 1815 at the Congress of Vienna as an amical protectorate under the United Kingdom. In article 1 of section VI in the treaty, it stated that the new United States of the Ionian Islands' national flag would be the flag of the Septinsular Republic, a Venetian lion of Saint Mark holding a Bible on a blue background, with a Union Jack in the canton to symbolise the British protectorate.

== Maritime usage ==
During shipping in the Black Sea and the Eastern Mediterranean, the flag of the United States of the Ionian Islands would often be used as a flag of convenience by Greek ships to purport that they enjoyed the protection of the British Empire. The British ambassador to the Ottoman Empire, Percy Smythe, 6th Viscount Strangford, was annoyed by this and wrote to his opposite number stating that "The subjects of the Ionian States must be taught that their flag is too respectable to be converted into a mere matter of occasional convenience".

During the Crimean War, ships flying the Ionian Islands flag were presumed to not be allowed to trade with Russia. However the Judicial Committee of the Privy Council from the Admiralty court in 1855 held that as Queen Victoria had negotiated treaties with other nations specifically including the United States of the Ionian Islands separately, instead of the implied inclusion with the Crown Colonies through mentioning just the United Kingdom alone, the Ionian Islands were not technically at war with the Russian Empire as the United Kingdom had not separately declared war on their behalf by mentioning them in the original declaration. However, the judgement also stated that ships flying the Ionian flag were not British and that the citizens were not British subjects as the United States of the Ionian Islands were a protectorate and not a colony. Therefore, Ionian flagged ships were entitled to trade with Russia during the Crimean War, while British ships were not, but they did not enjoy the rights and protection of the United Kingdom.

== Disestablishment ==
In 1864, pursuant to the Treaty of London the United Kingdom ceded the United States of the Ionian Islands to the Kingdom of Greece as a gesture of goodwill following Prince Alfred declining to accept the Greek throne despite Greek popular request. Upon the annexation of the Ionian Islands, the flag of the United States ceased to have official status and was replaced by the flag of Greece.
