= Flag of Tanganyika Territory =

Tanganyika Territory
- Use: Civil ensign
- Adopted: 1923
- Relinquished: 1961
- Government ensign of Tanganyika
- Use: State ensign
- Adopted: 1923
- Relinquished: 1961
- Flag of the governor of Tanganyika
- Use: Other
- Adopted: 1923
- Relinquished: 1961

The flag of Tanganyika, used between 1923 and 1961, was a British Red Ensign with a giraffe head in a white disk. It was used as the flag of Tanganyika Territory while under British Empire administration as a League of Nations mandate and later United Nations trust territory.

== History ==
Prior to 1916, Tanganyika was a part of German East Africa and used the flag of the Reichskolonialamt. In 1916, Tanganyika was taken from Germany as a result of the First World War and given to the United Kingdom as a League of Nations mandate. Upon Sir Horace Byatt becoming the first Governor of Tanganyika as a British mandate, he designed a badge of a giraffe on a white disk for Tanganyika. This was because of a custom of British East African territories adopting native animals as a symbol of national identity, with the giraffe being chosen for Tanganyika based on their ubiquity within the territory. Byatt then placed the badge on a Red Ensign to be used as the official flag of Tanganyika. The Governor also adopted the giraffe badge in the centre of a Union Jack as the governor's flag.

Though the Red Ensign became the main flag to represent the territory individually, there was also a variant of the flag including a Blue Ensign with the giraffe head not being surrounded by a white disk. In 1961 when Tanganyika was granted independence from the British Empire, it was the Union Jack and not the colonial flag that was lowered at the independence ceremony. As a result, the Tanganyikan Red Ensign ceased to have official usage and was replaced by the flag of Tanganyika and later the flag of Tanzania though the giraffe was retained as the national animal of both successor countries.

This flag has a place in the history of the flags of Tanzania.

== See also ==
- Vexillology
