= British Empire flag =

Unofficial flag of the British Empire

A surviving Empire flag from a Royal Museums Greenwich collection

The early 1900s saw many calls for the British Empire to adopt a new flag representative of all its dominions, Crown colonies, protectorates, and territories. Such a role was already fulfilled by the Union Jack of the United Kingdom, but some regions of the empire were beginning to develop distinct national identities that no longer seemed appropriately showcased by that flag alone. For example, after achieving self-governance, Canada used a British ensign emblazoned by its coat of arms as a flag to represent itself internationally. Other regions such as Australia, New Zealand, and South Africa began using similar flags as they gained autonomy as well. Although the Union Jack in the canton of these flags was a natural inclusion to their primarily British settlers, who considered the United Kingdom to be their homeland, some believed that the growing status of all these new nations deserved to be highlighted in some form. This led to the creation of Empire flags, which saw use from the beginning of the reign of George V to the end of the Second World War.

== Views on using the Union Jack ==
=== A flag of the British Isles ===
The Union Jack saw use in colonies in part due to a lack of local flags

What made the British Empire unique among its contemporaries was that it resembled an association of nations rather than a highly centralized state. The laws and institutions of each constituent territory did not necessarily recognise the existence of a wider empire. It was pointed out at a 1914 series of lectures on the governance of the British Empire at King's College that there was no common currency in circulation, record of marital status, or process of naturalization. The Union Jack also did not function as a true Empire flag as far as the law was concerned. Each of the territories of the empire were simply possessions of a common monarch. Despite the legislative supremacy of the United Kingdom, colonial opinions were moving toward seeking institutional equality while still recognizing a shared existence under the Crown.

==== Canadian opinions ====
In 1913, an article featured by the Evening Record in Canada acknowledged the Union Jack as an Empire flag, with the caveat of not necessarily being able to adequately represent certain nationalities. The author described their dissatisfaction with the lack of patriotism on display in Canada, and how many would rather spend vacations in London rather than exploring their own country. He saw value in the introduction of flag drills and other patriotic ceremonies to get schoolchildren interested in their home, but not if they would utilize the Union Jack. The article ended with a call for a distinct Canadian flag in order to develop a sense of national unity.

A Canadian writing to the Leader-Post was featured in a 1939 article, and they claimed it was nonsense that adopting a flag to replace the Union Jack would be seen as a desire to withdraw from the empire. They felt a flag was necessary, as Canada had been forced to resort to an ensign meant for use at sea on all occasions it wanted to represent itself. On the Union Jack, the article argued that it was not an imperial flag due to it only having been designed due to changes occurring locally on the British Isles. There was no Canada or Australia when the Union Jack was first adopted, so it could not represent the hundreds of millions of people who had since become part of the empire. Furthermore, it claimed that if the monarch referred to Canada as one of multiple free and equal nations within the empire, Canada was entitled to a flag as a mark of nationhood.

The Native Sons of Canada renewed demands for a Canadian flag around 1932, and held many discussions on the matter at their conventions since 1925. C. M. Woodworth, the vice president of the organisation, believed that it was unacceptable for Canada to continue flying the Union Jack when other countries such as Ireland and South Africa had adopted their own. He claimed the flags of Ireland and South Africa reduced the Union Jack to being a symbol that could only represent the United Kingdom, and that Canada had to follow their lead in adopting a distinct design of its own. The Canadian Red Ensign was not considered to be sufficient, as it was not necessarily a legal flag. It was only approved for use at sea as a civil ensign, and Canada recognized the Union Jack alone in any official capacity. This left Canada as the only dominion to not have a unique flag recognized by law. The lack of a flag was becoming problematic as well, as Woodworth noted how some in Quebec had taken to flying the French tricolour after a visit by their navy. High support for a new flag in Ontario and Quebec was cited, but it was noted that a major obstacle was choosing a design. The only thing most could agree on was the inclusion of a maple leaf. Near the end of the article is a mention of Woodworth having withheld his opinion on the creation of an Empire flag.

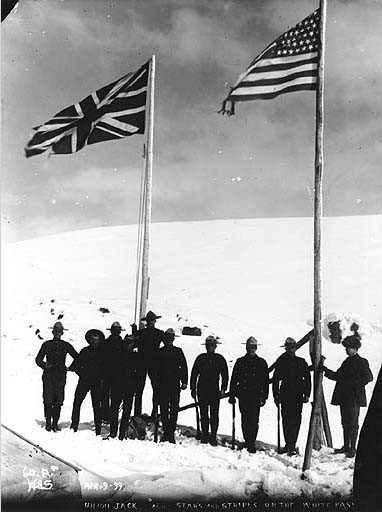
A Union Jack at the border of Alaska and British Columbia in 1899

In 1939, both Prime Minister Mackenzie King and R. B. Bennett, leader of the Opposition, endorsed a proposal made in the House of Commons for a distinct Canadian flag like those already adopted by the other dominions. It was initially put forward by Cameron McIntosh, a Liberal member from Saskatchewan, who called for creating a committee to investigate the matter. Thomas Church, Frederick Betts, and J. R. MacNicol of the Conservatives opposed this on the grounds that a flag may erode imperial unity. However, Bennett believed this concern to be unfounded after visiting the other dominions and noting that the strong bonds with the United Kingdom were still clearly visible, despite the Union Jack not being as widely used as in Canada. Mackenzie King approached his argument for change from a historical angle. He reviewed the history of the evolution of the Union Jack, and how it changed to reflect the political reality of the British Isles. It had only become the flag of the empire in 1801, and has since not changed with the unforeseen emergence of the dominions later in the century. The Union Jack was given official status in Canada by the insistence of the Colonial Secretary, but their role in the country had been abolished as the dominions earned more autonomy. In the eyes of Mackenzie King, the situation had at that point changed completely. He later highlighted other practical issues as well. These included not having a unique flag to use at overseas legations, at war memorials where fallen Canadian soldiers could not be highlighted among the other imperial forces, and at international events such as the Olympics. Canada also had difficulty standing out as a distinct realm of the British Empire if it continued using the Union Jack.

==== Australian opinions ====
A 1924 article in Australia declared the idea that there is a British Empire flag was a misconception. The flag was pointed out as being designed for the United Kingdom specifically, and that use of it elsewhere was highly restricted. Even the governor general of a dominion could not fly the flag without defacing it with their emblem. Those in the Australian Army had to deface the Union Jack if it formed part of their regimental colours, and the Royal Australian Navy could not use it as well. Soldiers of the British Army were alleged to have the privilege to remove the Union Jack wherever it was flown inappropriately, but this was not ever exercised. The article went on to encourage Australians to use their own flag, as it was "an act of grace and love" for the monarch to have provided one unique to them. It argued that it was not an act of disrespect to fly it in place of the Union Jack when it was already included in the design.

The unified arms of the United Kingdom, Canada, Australia, and New Zealand

There was a slightly different opinion offered in a 1926 article in the Southern Cross weekly newspaper. It argued that the Union Jack had become an outdated symbol since the establishment of the Irish Free State. Additionally, it questioned why the dominions recognized the United Kingdom in their flags through the Union Jack without any reciprocation. Maxwell Garnett, general secretary of the League of Nations Union, suggested altering the Royal Standard of the United Kingdom to include dominion symbols as a possible solution for that issue.

Another article published around the same time in the Southern Mail indicated that some Australians had begun to think of the Union Jack as a foreign symbol. The author spoke of a man who referred to the Union Jack as the symbol of a united England, Scotland, and Ireland rather than the entire British Empire. He questioned whether the man was ashamed to be living under the Union Jack, and wished for everyone in the country to forget their past and enjoy the privileges afforded to them as Australians. What followed in the text was a rebuttal, claiming that Australians did not see the Union Jack as a flag of servitude. Nonetheless, the author still supported those choosing to fly the Australian flag itself, as it was itself a privilege granted by the British.

==== South African opinions ====
One proposal had effectively reused the flag of the Orange Free State

Observations on the Union Jack not being representative of the entire empire saw support from Prime Minister Hertzog of South Africa later in 1926 when his government was considering a new national flag. He believed the Union Jack was only being flown in the dominions due to historical precedence, and that it was just the flag of the United Kingdom in actuality. At the time of these remarks, Hertzog appeared to suggest that the incorporation of the Union Jack into the new South African flag was not in consideration. However, he still stated that he aimed to maintain good relations with the rest of the empire, and that any design elements on the new flag referring to the close relationship it has with South Africa would likely be favourably received by the government. Despite that, many designs under consideration ended up not featuring a symbol for the wider empire or the Union Jack at all, with some opting to instead make references to the Boer republics.

=== A flag of the British Empire ===
Most support for the Union Jack as being the flag of the empire as a whole came from Canada. As far back as 1901, before the other dominions had adopted national flags, an article from the Ottawa Journal claimed that calls for a distinct Canadian flag would remain a farce so long as the empire remained. This was in response to a Mail and Empire report on Australia adopting a national flag, exploring how it could come to inspire a similar move in Canada. However, even it believed that the use of the Union Jack itself could not be superseded. Any flag to be adopted by Canada was generally only ever proposed as something that could fly alongside the Union Jack to represent the Canadian people specifically. Otherwise, the fear was that the significance of the Union Jack would weaken in the country and a key symbol of unity with the United Kingdom would be lost.

In 1921, the Vancouver branch of the Royal Society of Saint George celebrated an announcement made by Mayor Gale that the Union Jack would be flying on all public buildings in the city for Saint George's Day. They considered it to be an Empire flag under which Canadians could share all the accomplishments of their fellow British subjects. Some events like the Zeebrugge Raid and the Battle of Trafalgar were highlighted by the society as moments for all Canadians to be proud of. They also encouraged the celebration of other events such as Saint Andrew's Day for the Scottish, Saint Patrick's Day for the Irish, or Dominion Day for Canadians. Each of these days were considered an important part of the heritage of everyone in the country, and represented a common future for all the peoples they represent under the Union Jack in its role as an Empire flag.

At the 1934 British Empire Games in London, athletes from all nations participating marched behind their own national flags during the parade in the opening ceremony. However, leading them into the stadium at the very front was a single flag bearer carrying the Union Jack. This symbolized how all the participants belonged to the British Empire. A pledge of allegiance to the king and an oath of sportsmanship were also taken on the flag.

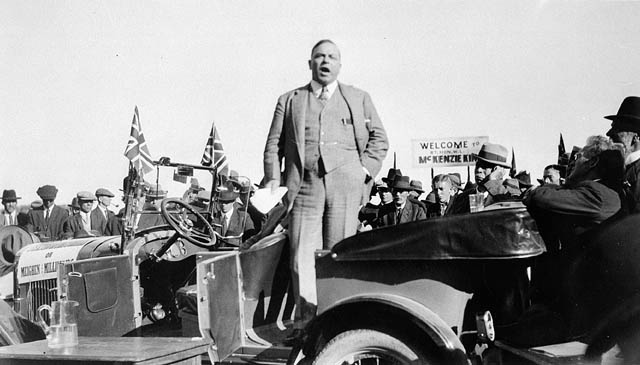
The prime minister travelled in a car bearing Union Jacks in Canada

Upon arrival in London for the 1937 Imperial Conference, ministers representing Canada were greeted by cars provided by the British government bearing Canadian Red Ensigns rather than the Union Jack. The British had the understanding that it was the official flag of Canada. A journalist with the Winnipeg Free Press, Grant Dexter, reported that the Canadians were somewhat embarrassed by the situation since it was a break from protocol at home. In Canada, the only flag flown on vehicles travelling over land was the Union Jack. Canadian ensigns were only ever used at sea. Many in the United Kingdom were puzzled by Canada, the most senior dominion of the empire, not having an official flag to represent itself as all the others did. Dexter would go on to write more articles over the year regarding the awkwardness brought on by the lack of a Canadian flag. Another had reported that the British people saw the Union Jack as their own flag rather than that of the whole empire, and that none of them would have taken offence to Canada wanting its own. It went on to add that the many flags of the dominions were looked upon with pride, as they represented the vastness of the empire rather than breaks in imperial unity. However, the opposite view was taken by some in Canada, and this stalled efforts to consider an official national flag. A new flag to replace the Union Jack was not necessarily something that many had strong feelings on at the time.

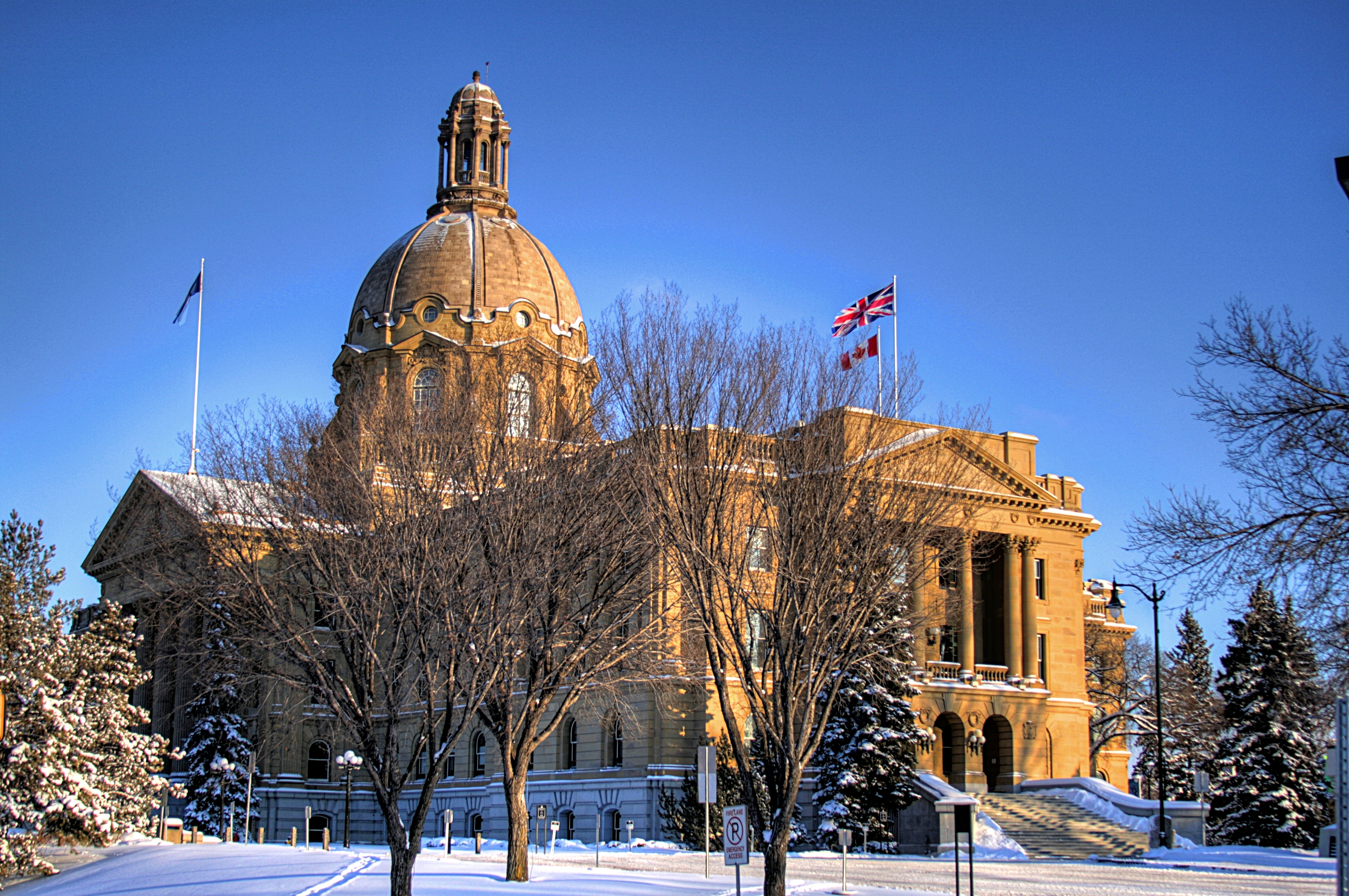
The Union Jack seen flying above the Alberta Legislature Building

In 1946, Prime Minister Mackenzie King of Canada issued instructions that the Canadian Red Ensign be flown on all public buildings rather than the Union Jack to prepare for the adoption of a new national flag at a later time. This was met with widespread controversy. William Duff, a senator from Lunenburg, sent a telegram in protest. He argued that the Union Jack would remain appropriate to fly so long as Canada remained part of the British Empire, and that it would be best for the Red Ensign to continue its role as a civil flag. The Union Jack has maintained official status in the country since the adoption of the Maple Leaf Flag in 1965, and is flown from all government buildings with an available flagpole on Commonwealth Day to represent continued loyalty to the Crown. Some of the provincial legislatures, such as those of Saskatchewan and Alberta, continue to fly the Union Jack from their buildings at all times to this day. It is also still present as a major design element in the provincial flags of Ontario, Manitoba, and British Columbia.

== Calls for an official Empire flag ==
=== 1897 imperial unity proposal ===
One of the first suggestions for a new flag representing the British Empire in its entirety was recorded to have been made in an 1897 Western Morning News article. An advisor to Queen Victoria from one of the colonies had reportedly suggested the creation of a common Empire flag to ensure everyone would feel as though they belong in the same polity, and this was expected to strengthen imperial unity. Their proposed design was a flag featuring the arms of the United Kingdom, the self-governing colonies, and India. Reactions were positive, but some felt unsure if it would truly unite the empire. The reason given was that many had fought and died under the Union Jack over the years, and it might have been difficult to accept a new flag.

=== 1900 initialled star proposal ===
The four points of the star represent America, Asia, Africa, and Australia

A correspondent for The Pall Mall Gazette going by the name Japhet had created a star pattern to be used on a flag that would replace the Union Jack. The star has four points, and each one forms the letter "A" with bars that are drawn across them. It was intended to represent the overseas territories of the British Empire found in America, Asia, Africa, and Australia. This design would later see criticism in a letter to the St James's Gazette. It was described to be more of a colonial flag rather than an imperial one due to the focus on overseas territories. The emphasis on each continent was also pointed out to be a false claim to the British controlling the entirety of each one. Certain territories that were especially important to the empire, such as India, were said to have not been highlighted correctly at all. According to the critique, India deserved more significance on any new flag due to it raising the status of the monarch to that of an emperor. Furthermore, regardless of the territories highlighted, this was a design incredibly sensitive to changes in the borders of the empire. It was unclear what would happen to the star should any large part of the empire suddenly be lost. Finally, it was pointed out that Europe had no presence in the design, despite being home to the seat of the empire and certain other imperial possessions.

Bosanquet aimed to maintain the usual format of the Union Jack

Parsons had opted for a format with distinct symbols for each nation

Two additional flag designs were described alongside the same letter by other authors, and both were made in response to Japhet's star. First was a suggestion by Charles J. Bosanquet for a Union Jack with gold bars crossing its quadrants. Together, they formed a diamond, symbolizing the four parts of the empire that Japhet wanted to highlight with his star. Next was the proposal by J. Denham Parsons. It placed the emblems of England, Scotland, Ireland, Canada, Australia, India, and South Africa in the quadrants of the Cross of Saint George. He aimed to emulate the distinct symbols of the Royal Standard.

=== 1901 English flag proposal ===
The English flag saw overseas use since the early days of the empire

In 1901, William Laird Clowes wrote an article urging the creation of a common imperial flag. He pointed out that the empire had over a dozen flags in use at the time, but there were cases where it would be desirable to avoid distinctions. It was argued that for occasions where the British Empire must be seen acting as a whole, it would be better to have a common flag representing all its subjects. While the Union Jack may have already filled this role, Laird Clowes believed it was too often supplanted by other flags depending on the situation. The Royal Navy had the White Ensign, the Naval Reserve used the Blue Ensign, and the mercantile marine used the Red Ensign. Each colony also had an ensign of its own. For an alternative, Laird Clowes suggested that the Cross of Saint George be promoted from being the flag of England alone to that of the entire British Empire. As it had been an English flag for a long period of history, it commanded significant respect.

=== 1901 imperial arms proposal ===
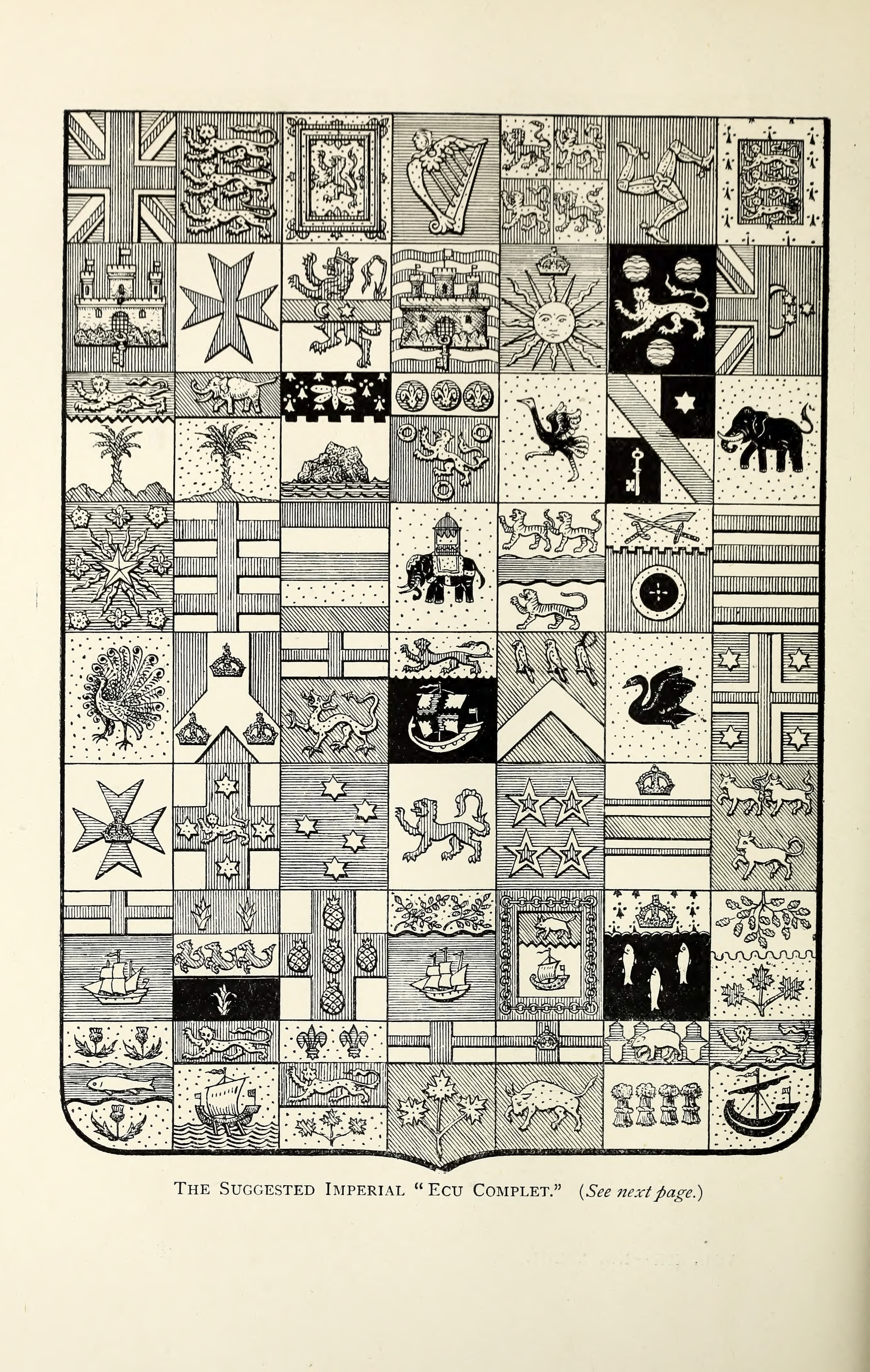
The original sketch of the arms that Chadwick titled the "Ecu Complet"

A proposal was developed in 1900 by Edward Marion Chadwick, a prominent Canadian heraldist who was at the forefront of nurturing the study of armorial bearings in the country, to combine the arms of all the territories of the British Empire. In response to a challenge put out by the Genealogical Magazine, he conceived a shield of fifty-six quarterings in the style of the Canadian badge. Subdivisions of larger polities make up a large part of the total number. For example, the Canadian provinces are all featured separately rather than as one unit. Countries such as Wales were also afforded representation, despite usually being left out of designs for items such as this. Most arms were directly based on records made available by the British Admiralty, but some were allegedly so inadmissible for use that Chadwick took it upon himself to redesign them. Certain arms were entirely unique designs in cases where none existed, like those of the Northwest Territories.

Compromises had to be made by Chadwick in many areas. The African arms featured are designed for entire regions, due to many of the colonies there having just been established. Furthermore, the Indian arms were a challenge due to the complex political divisions that existed on the subcontinent. Many princely states were left out, as Chadwick believed he could not represent their nobility with the grandeur necessary within a combined coat of arms. There was also the issue of representing differences in noble ranks. A maharajah ruling over a million subjects could not necessarily be placed on the same level as a rajah with a few thousand. The result did not include as many of the territories of the British Empire as Chadwick wanted, and he determined that it could not be officially adopted as a result. He asked readers to submit suggestions for South African arms to be included in the future, but it is unknown if he continued developing this concept further.

Canada quartered the arms of its founding provinces from 1868

Each new province had its arms added to the badge over time

The following year, in 1901, a proposal was made by a Canadian writing to the St James's Gazette. Since Confederation, Canada had used the quartered coats of arms of its founding provinces as a national badge for use on flags. It was observed that the entry of Manitoba in the federation resulted in its arms being added to the badge by flag makers across the country. The article speculated that the Federation of Australia would result in a similar flag being designed with the arms of its states, and that an "uninterrupted evolution" of unique emblems from across the colonies would eventually form one Empire flag.

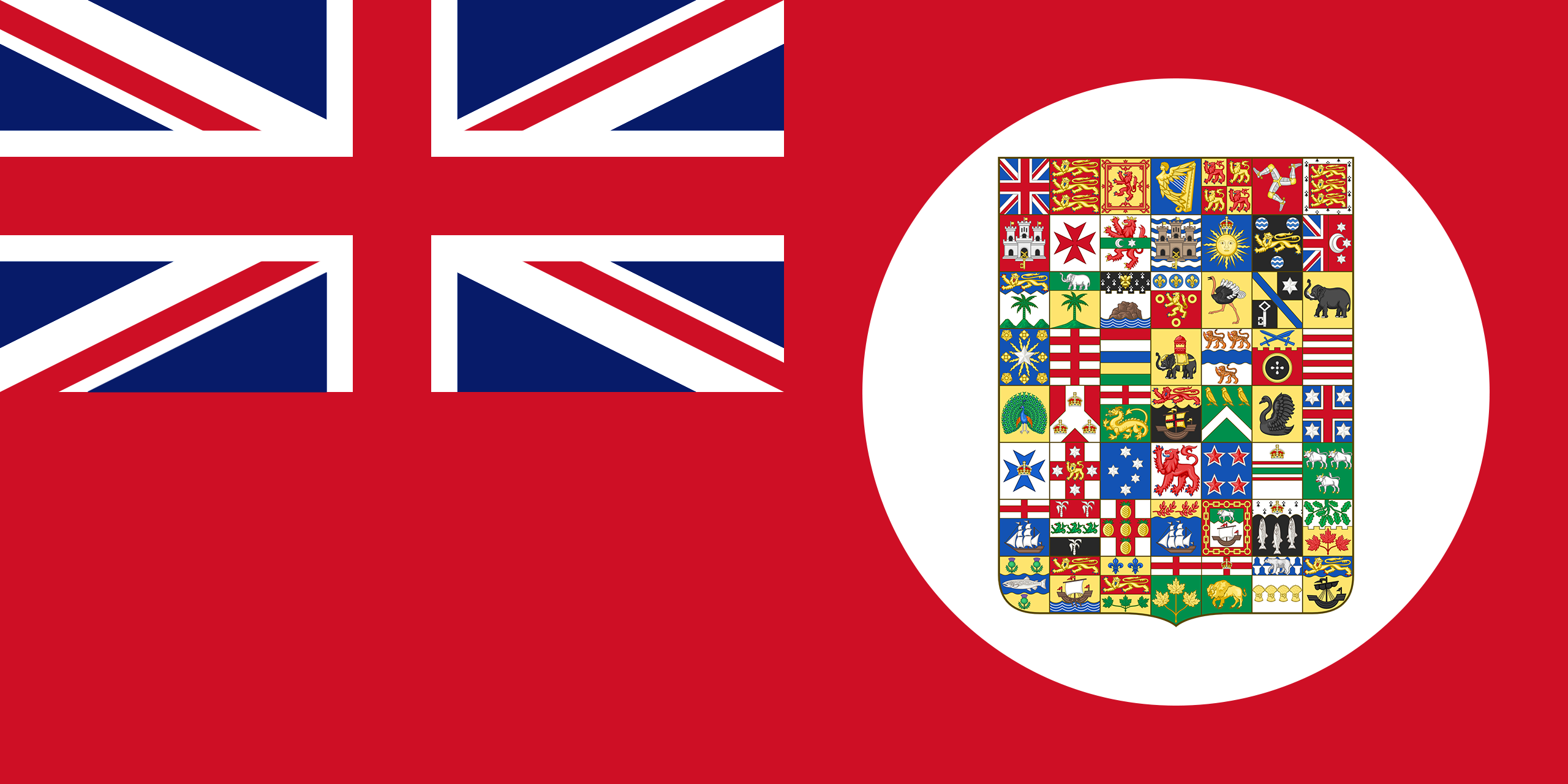
The St James's Gazette proposal with the arms Chadwick created

It was envisioned that the final result of the flag proposed in the article would be similar to the Canadian Red Ensign in design. The Union Jack would still fill the canton, and the combined badge of all the territories of the empire would sit in the fly. Each of the arms of the confederated entities featured on the badge would be placed in sequence of their own constitutional formation. The badge itself would be placed on a large white disc, as was usually done on British ensigns, to improve the visibility of the large number of featured arms. It was made clear by the author that his Empire flag proposal would not ever replace the Union Jack, as it would always remain the universal British emblem. He believed the crosses left no room for additional emblems to be featured, and that most people considered the Union Jack too sacred to modify.

=== 1902 Daily Express proposal ===
The Indian variant of the flag design described by the Daily Express

In 1902, the Daily Express reported that the new King Edward VII was taking suggestions for the design of an Empire flag. This was after the Prince and Princess of Wales allegedly received many requests for a new flag during a tour of the empire in the year prior. A man by the name of C. D. Bennett, identified only as "the cousin of a distinguished colonial governor," had come forward with a design. What he proposed was a Cross of Saint George to represent the English people, with a crown featured in the canton. Underneath the crown would be a blue scroll bearing a Latin motto that would be translated as "the empire on which the sun never sets." A large golden sun would have defaced the centre of the flag to further reinforce that symbolism. The top right would be occupied by the unique emblem of the territory that the flag is in. For example, the Star of India would be placed there to represent the British Raj when flying the flag within its jurisdiction.

The design that likely would have been flown in Canada, with the coat of arms then used as a Canada's badge on flags

Canadian and Australian variants with their own symbols were also mentioned in the article. It is unknown why the proposal did not go ahead. Despite the positive reception claimed, some negative reactions were expressed. The Australian E Wilson Dobbs (who later designed the first official Australian coat of arms) writing to The Age, shared concerns that the flag as described in the Express had broken established rules of English heraldry by placing a yellow sun on a white background. Both colours are considered metals, and are typically forbidden from being placed one on the other.

=== 1905 British race proposal ===
The Newcastle Morning Herald and Miners' Advocate proposal of 1905

A 1905 article in the Newcastle Morning Herald And Miners' Advocate promoted the Union Jack as the perfect flag of "the [British] race." The Union Jack was unique compared to the flags of France, Germany, and Russia, which all shared common design elements. Additionally, it was pointed out as not being subject to constant change like the American flag. The author described the Betsy Ross design adopted during the American Revolutionary War as being perfect, and the addition of stars for every new state as a sort of decay in purity. However, he still went on to advocate for the addition of five stars on the Union Jack to represent the dominions as integral units of the empire. Canada, Australia, New Zealand, and South Africa would each have one. The fifth star would stand for "the other and less important possessions."

=== Post-1910 flag proposals ===
A recreation of the flag described by John Lavington Bonython in 1916

There were high-level calls for an Empire flag in 1910, but discussions on this were deferred until the 1911 Imperial Conference. It was ultimately not raised as a topic, with most of the conference being focused on forming an Imperial Federation. The president of the Australian Natives' Association called for a "truly union flag of the empire" featuring the dominions in 1916. He felt it was necessary due to them taking up arms in defence of each other in the midst of the First World War. This proposal was also backed by John Lavington Bonython, a former mayor of Adelaide. Lavington Bonython compared the emergence of the dominions to the union of England, Scotland, and Ireland. What he called for was a small addition to the Union Jack, such as a thin cross that would not be too noticeable. These proposals were rejected by association members, as they felt the Union Jack already did well to represent the majority of the population with British heritage.

Reuters circulated a story in 1916 that the Daily Graphic had urged the adoption of an imperial flag to take the role of the Union Jack. Another call for an Empire flag was made by Prime Minister Massey of New Zealand near the end of the First World War in 1918. During a luncheon with Joseph Ward, Thomas Mackenzie, and other prominent New Zealand politicians, Massey lamented the losses that had been suffered by the dominions. He denounced the Germans for their role in sinking a Canadian hospital ship and a New Zealand steamship. After expressing a desire to continue fighting until Germany fell, Massey stated that the dominions deserved representation on a flag together with the United Kingdom as equal partners in the empire.

It was reported in 1919 that the Empire Day Movement Committee in London had adopted a resolution urging the governments of the empire to discuss the creation of a new flag. The resolution was put forth by Godfrey Lagden, vice president of the Royal Colonial Institute, and seconded by Edward Lucas, the agent general for South Australia. The flag would be flown each Empire Day at churches and public buildings as a form of thanksgiving. Prime Minister Lloyd George of the United Kingdom acknowledged the resolution in the House of Commons, and even suggested a similar service be held every Armistice Day as well. Later, there was speculation in 1921 that the partition of Ireland would result in a change to the Union Jack and an opportunity to add symbols of the dominions.

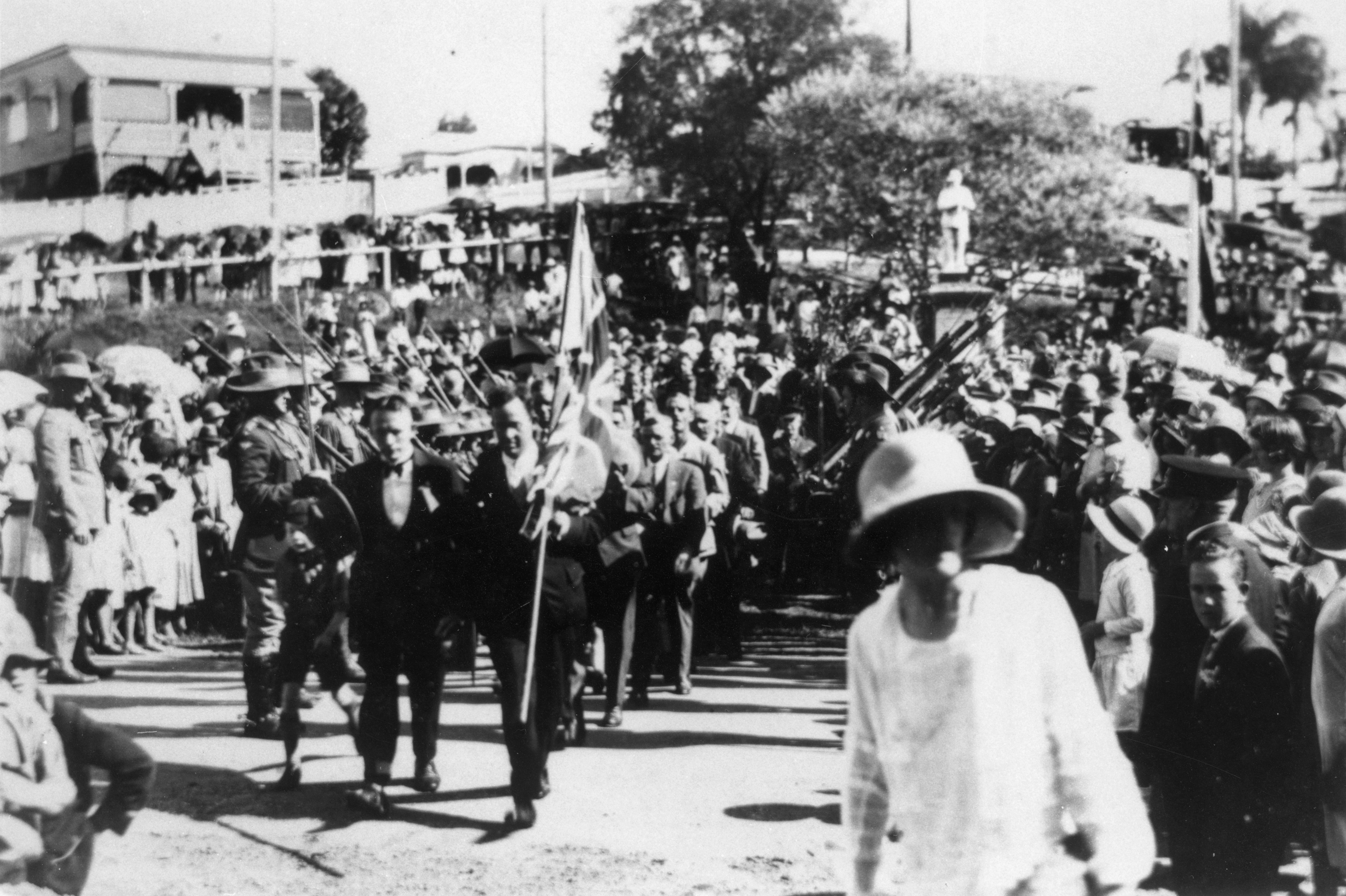
A 1922 Anzac Day parade led by a flag bearer with the Union Jack

On the tenth anniversary of Anzac Day in Australia, the Federal Capital Pioneer reported that the headmaster of the Randwick Commercial Intermediate High School had called for the creation of an official Empire flag during an address to approximately 700 students. It would have symbolized the combined effort that was undertaken by the empire to defeat Germany. The article reporting on this story supported creating what it had called a "Union Commonwealth Flag." The "British Commonwealth of Nations" had already become a term with which to describe the dominions collectively by this time, having first been coined by Jan Smuts of South Africa in 1917.

In 1926, efforts by South Africa to find a new national flag which may not have included the Union Jack as part of the design stirred controversy across the empire. The adoption of a wholly unique flag was viewed by some as a threat to imperial unity, and this spawned suggestions to indefinitely postpone the adoption of any new flags until a common Empire flag could be decided upon by all the dominions. A push was made to settle the matter in the next Imperial Conference. A discussion was not had by the time South Africa adopted its new flag in 1928. The Native Sons of Canada later lobbied for the creation of an Empire flag ahead of the 1932 Imperial Conference. James Cotton, a member from Toronto, sent a letter to Prime Minister Bennett and other delegates suggesting that they attempt getting approval for the idea.

The design of the Commonwealth flag that was adopted in 1976

Proposals for an official Empire or Commonwealth flag continued to be made as late as 1953. Keith Cameron Wilson, a Liberal member of the Australian House of Representatives, used question time to ask Prime Minister Menzies if he would discuss adding a symbol representing the dominions and colonies to the Union Jack with his counterparts. Wilson had indicated that an Empire flag could tie into efforts to improve relations with the rest of the Commonwealth of Nations. Another call for a flag was alleged to have come from Durban, South Africa, in a letter to the editor featured in the Ottawa Citizen in 1958. The author referred to the suggestion as being one that could solve the "flag issue" in Canada as well. Each nation of the empire would adopt its own national flag, and it would hold co-official status with an Empire flag for those who still primarily identified as being British. Therefore, people would always have one flag or another to identify with. The Commonwealth would go on to adopt an organisational flag in 1976, based on car pennants developed for the 1973 Commonwealth Heads of Government Meeting held in Ottawa. It featured a golden globe surrounded by many spearheads radiating from it. The spears do not boast the number of members, but instead the many ways in which the Commonwealth collaborates.

== Opposition to an Empire flag ==
Many early Australian flags deviated from the standard British designs

There were some who held a strong sense of loyalty to the Union Jack. Barlow Cumberland, the Canadian writer of a 1897 book chronicling the history of the Union Jack, acknowledged the Australian tendency to create many local flags as a form of patriotism. However, he had also described it as a poor habit that only promoted separatist ideas rather than a shared allegiance to the empire. Colonial authorities had allowed distinctive badges to be placed on ensigns for identification purposes, but these additional Australian flags were a step away from those guidelines. Barlow argued that Canada had done much better in the development of "new and imperial ideas" by utilizing more traditional designs, such as the Canadian Red Ensign, which followed the rules outlined by the British to the letter.

In 1902, after the Daily Express circulated reports on King Edward VII taking suggestions for an Empire flag, a column in the Montreal Daily Witness had a very negative reaction. The author declared that "there could not be a worse mistake in empire building than any interference with the flag." Following that were questions on whether the king actually granted someone a commission for a new flag, and a description of the design as preposterous. They were also sceptical that the colonies had even wanted to replace the Union Jack. According to the author, if the Union Jack represented the British, then it also served as a sufficient emblem for the rest of the empire since the colonies spawned descend from them. The author had concluded that it would be best to continue the practice of simply allowing each territory of the empire to fly ensigns defaced with their own symbols.

Daniël François Malan, the South African minister at the forefront of the 1926 campaign to change the national flag, held the opinion that an imperial flag was unnecessary. In his view, the British Empire ceased to exist once the dominions were granted control of their foreign policy, and that South Africa no longer even needed to declare its neutrality if the British were to go to war anymore. A non-existent entity did not need a flag to represent itself. These sentiments were the subject of controversy among the British population of South Africa amidst an already contentious flag debate.

== Common Empire flag designs ==
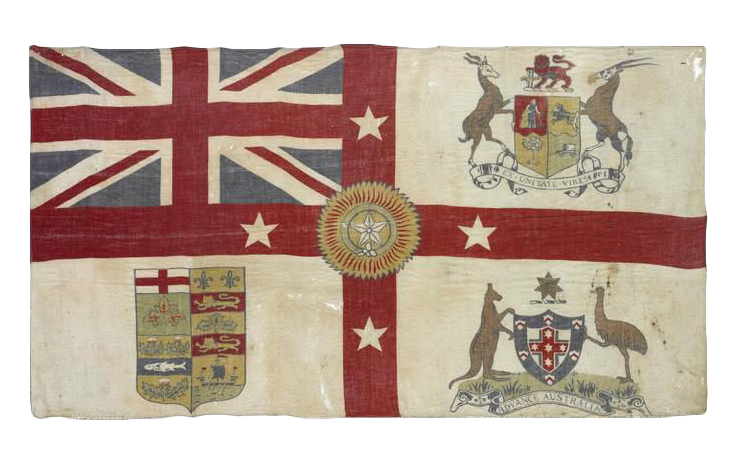
An Empire flag that was among the first to use the design from 1910

Despite the failure in gaining traction for an official Empire flag, an unofficial design with a strong similarity to the proposal originally described by the Daily Express in 1902 became popular among the public in the interwar period. This flag was a White Ensign featuring the symbols of the dominions. Canada was represented by the shield from its coat of arms in the bottom left. The coat of arms of South Africa was placed in the top right, and the coat of arms of Australia was in the bottom right. Four stars on the cross represented New Zealand, and the Star of India was placed in the centre. It is unknown how this flag came to be. This design could only have been adopted after 17 September 1910, when South Africa was granted its coat of arms. New Zealand did not adopt its coat of arms until 26 August 1911, and it appears to be absent in the design. Most of these flags were sewn at proportions of 1:2 at full size or 2:3 for smaller hand-held formats, but examples of 3:5 and 5:8 designs also exist.

Reconstructions of Empire flag variants

1910–1921: The original after a coat of arms was granted to South Africa

1921: An Australian variant featuring a wreath around the arms of Canada

1921–1930: Canada adopts new arms to replace its quartering of provinces

1930–?: Updated South African arms and erroneous colours for Australia

Different variants of each coat of arms had been featured depending on the year in which each flag was manufactured. This can be seen in the arms of Canada changing after a new design was adopted in 1921. It is unknown why the Australian coat of arms originally used was never updated after being replaced in 1912, but the 1908 design did receive a change in colours in later years that have not been observed elsewhere. There also appears to have been a 1921 variant of the Empire flag that was unique to Australia. It featured a wreath of maple and oak leaves around the Canadian coat of arms, a much smaller Star of India, and an off-centre Cross of Saint George. Additionally, the Canadian arms appear to be a design used from 1873 to 1907 due to the visible absence of Saskatchewan and Alberta. This variant of the flag was originally flown at the unveiling of the Dangarsleigh War Memorial in 1921. Modern recreations of an Empire flag utilizing the arms of a post-1921 Canada and pre-1930 South Africa have been made as well.

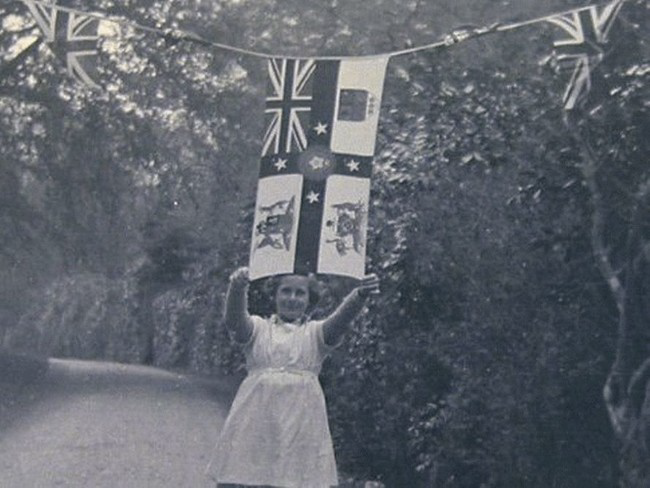
A photo of a girl holding an Empire flag in the form of a street bunting

The flag is most often believed to have been used for events such as Empire Day or the British Empire Exhibition as a patriotic display. A specimen is held in the Canadian Flag Collection, and it is most often attributed to the 1924 edition of the latter. However, it is unclear if the flag was designed specifically for these events. The British Empire Exhibition could have been the place of origin for the 1921 variant, since it occurred after Canada had adopted its new coat of arms, but that particular event aimed "to enable all who owe allegiance to the British flag to meet on common ground and learn to know each other." Introducing a new Empire flag runs counter to that statement, and most flags at the exhibition simply featured Union Jacks defaced by portraits of the monarch. Furthermore, the green compartment of the South African coat of arms often present on flags attributed to the British Empire Exhibition did not see formal adoption by the country until much later in 1930. Given the timing of updates made to the Empire flag, it is much more likely that most were for royal events, such as coronations.

The earliest date the Empire flag could have been designed is just before the coronation of King George V in 1911. It also may have been created for the Imperial Conference that was being held at the same time, and the adoption of an Empire flag was originally intended to be part of the meeting agenda. Furthermore, there are multiple events marking possible points in time that the refreshed design from the 1930s could have first been proliferated. An early candidate is the passage of the Statute of Westminster in 1931. The Silver Jubilee of King George V was held in 1935. Lastly, there was the coronation of King George VI, which occurred in 1937.

== Recorded uses of Empire flags ==
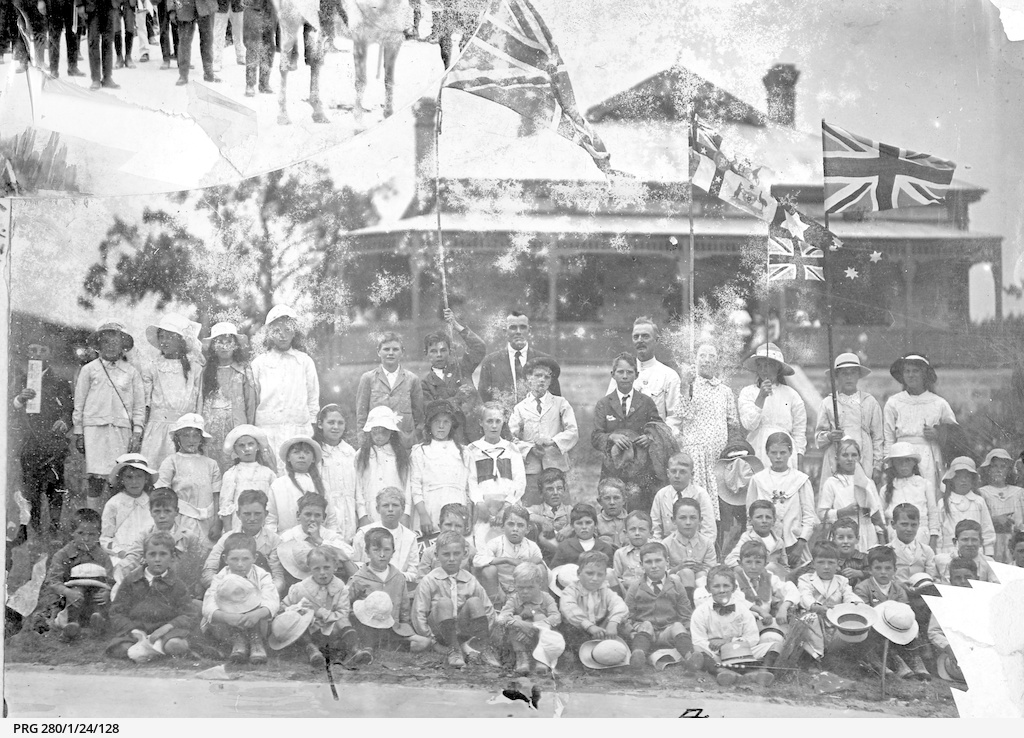
A patriotic procession at a school in Australia featuring the Empire flag

Despite their unclear origins, Empire flags went on to appear in many locations. Many households, memorials, and schools throughout the British Empire could be found flying them. The flag was available in a variety of sizes and formats, and this indicates that numerous manufacturers produced them. An Empire flag catalogued in Victorian Collections is stated to have been made in England specifically. Victorian Collections also has an entry for an Empire flag from 1910 listed by the Lara branch of the Returned and Services League of Australia as a Commonwealth flag from the First World War. Another flag dated to 1910 can be found listed in Carter's Price Guides to Antiques and Collectables, and it is simply referred to as an Australian design rather than one for the empire as a whole. A 1919 photograph from Aldgate hosted by the State Library of South Australia demonstrates schoolchildren flying a number of British flags for a patriotic procession, and the Empire flag can be spotted among them.

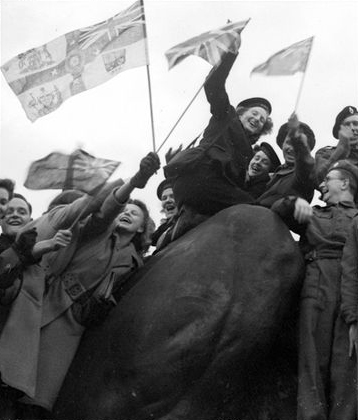
The Empire flag seen the front page photo of the Daily Mirror on VE Day

The National Maritime Museum in London features a post-1930 Empire flag in a collection containing many other flags historically flown at sea. It is possible that it saw some use as a maritime flag, as the museum identifies it as a type of White Ensign. In 1939, a letter to the editor featured in the Vancouver Sun shared a sighting of an Empire flag during the royal tour of Canada by King George VI and Queen Elizabeth. They wrote of a White Ensign defaced by the emblem of India in the middle, Canada in the bottom left, Australia in the bottom right, and South Africa in the top right. Its description matched the popular design from 1910, which the author described as "exceedingly pretty and appropriate to the occasion." They wanted to know if it had any official status or if it was designed simply as a decoration. Nonetheless, they believed that the flag appeared to be authentic in its role. On Victory in Europe Day, the Daily Mirror published a photograph on its front page featuring the Empire flag. It is being flown by a woman in Trafalgar Square, celebrating the Allied victory with a large crowd. After the liberation of Singapore from Japanese forces in 1945, prisoners of war who were kept at Changi Prison signed their names on an Empire flag after being freed. Australian soldiers represented a majority of the prisoners. The original Empire flag bearing their signatures is currently in the possession of the Australian War Memorial in Canberra. Empire flags also saw use throughout Canada during the Second World War.

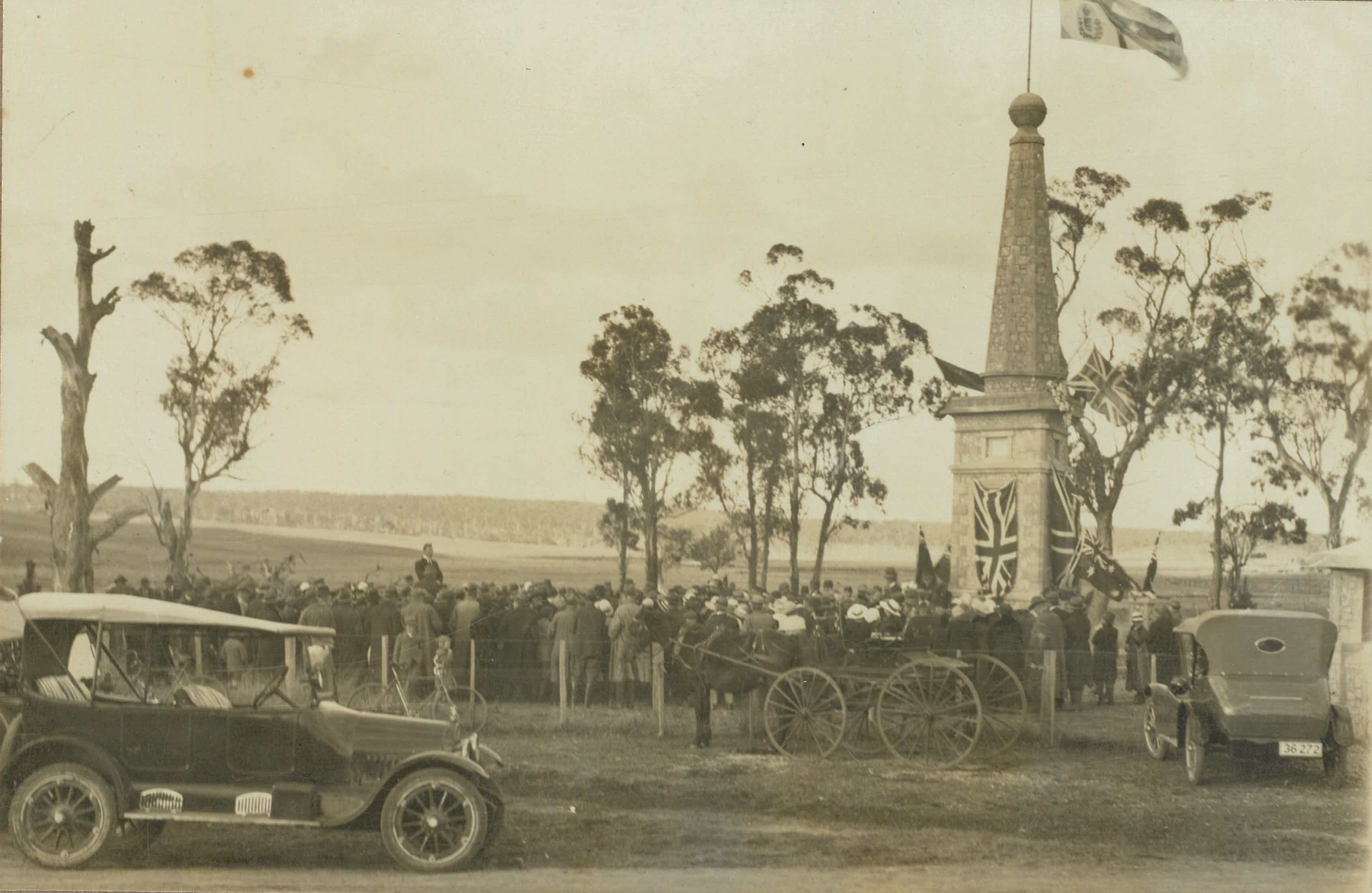
An Empire flag photographed atop the Dangarsleigh War Memorial

The Empire flag can still be found in use today at the Dangarsleigh War Memorial in New South Wales for special occasions. It was first opened on the Empire Day of 1921 with the flag hoisted above the monument. Below it was the flag of the United Kingdom (representing England) and the royal standards of Scotland and Ireland. On pillars around the monument were the ensigns of Canada, Australia, New Zealand, South Africa, and India. The Empire flag, referred to as a United Empire flag in some articles from the time, represented the eight countries featured on the memorial joined as one. The designer, a pastoralist named Alfred Haroldson Perrott, wanted to honour all the soldiers of the empire who fought and died in Europe alongside his late son. A celebration for the centennial in 2021 saw an Empire flag flying over the memorial once more. It featured older designs for the coats of arms to match the one used at the original unveiling. This is one of the few places in the world where the Empire flag was recorded to have been flown in some official capacity, and the monument even appears to have been designed with its use in mind due to it taking a prominent position.
