= White Ensign =

Flags used in Royal Navy vessels

- Use: Naval ensign
- Proportion: 1:2
- Adopted: Royal Navy
- Design: White field defaced with the Saint George's Cross and the Union placed in the canton.

The White Ensign, at one time called the St George's Ensign because of the simultaneous existence of a crossless version of the flag, is an ensign worn on British Royal Navy ships and shore establishments. It consists of a red St George's Cross on a white field, identical to the flag of England except with the Union Flag in the upper canton.

The White Ensign is also worn by yachts of members of the Royal Yacht Squadron and by ships of Trinity House escorting the reigning monarch.

In addition to the United Kingdom, several other nations have variants of the White Ensign with their own national flags in the canton, with the St George's Cross sometimes being replaced by a naval badge omitting the cross altogether. Yachts of the Royal Irish Yacht Club wear a white ensign with an Irish tricolour in the first quadrant and defaced by the crowned harp from the Heraldic Badge of Ireland. The flag of the British Antarctic Territory and the Commissioners' flag of the Northern Lighthouse Board place the Union emblem in the first quarter of a white field, omitting the overall red St George's Cross, but they are not ensigns for use at sea.

== History ==
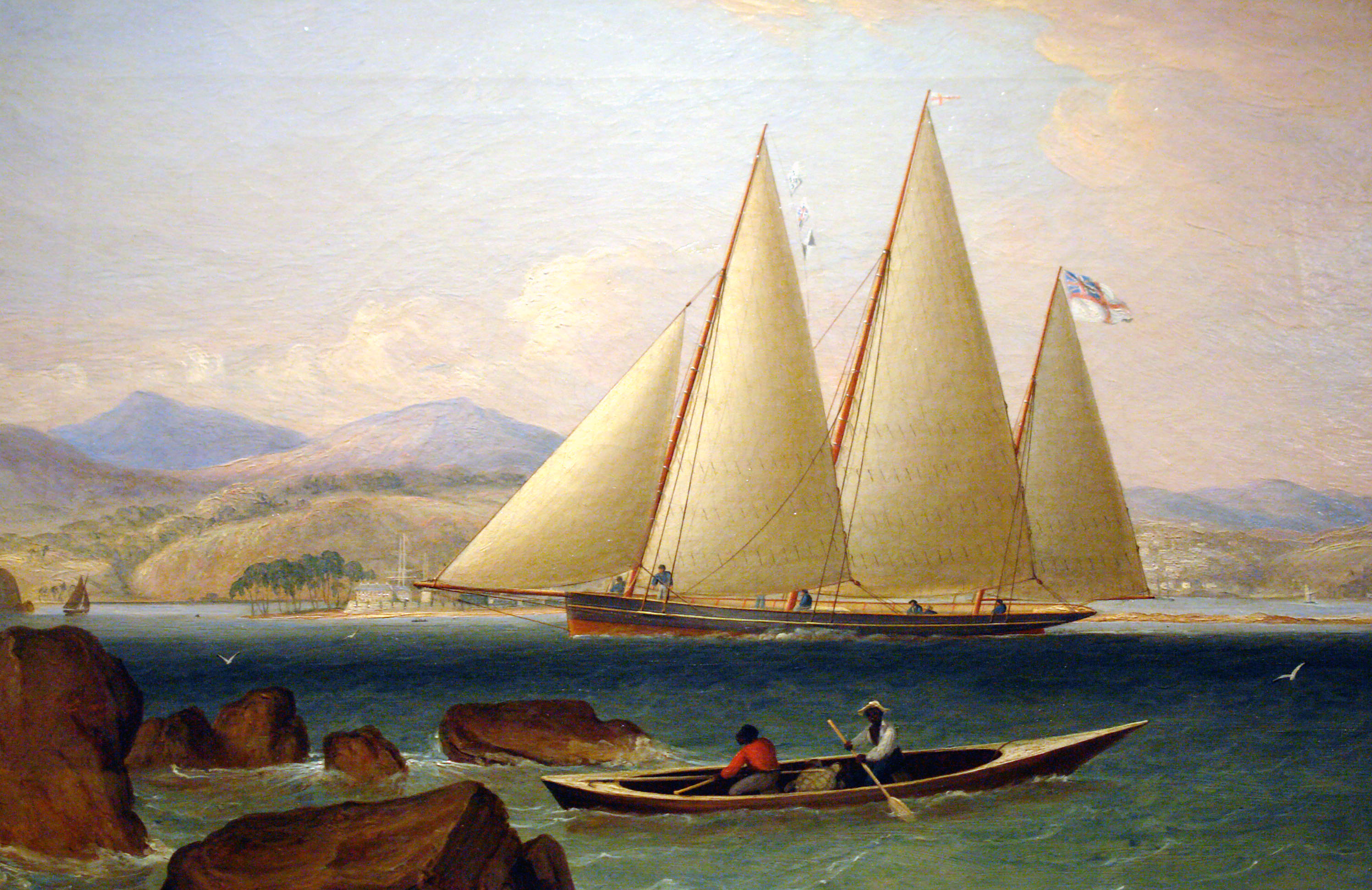
1831 painting of a Bermuda sloop of the Royal Navy flying the White Ensign

English naval ensigns were first used during the 16th century, and were often striped in green and white (the Tudor colours), but other colours were also used to indicate different squadrons, including blue, red and tawny brown. (These striped ensigns can be seen in use on both English and Spanish warships in contemporary paintings of the 1588 Spanish Armada battles). Later, there was usually a St George's Cross in the upper canton, or sewn across the field as on the modern White Ensign. These striped ensigns continued in use under the Stuart kings: the Naval ensign of 1623 is described as having "15 horizontal stripes alternately blue, white and yellow with a Cross of St George in the canton". This design fell out of use after 1630, with the introduction of the Red, White and Blue ensigns. The use of stripes continued in the red and white of both the flag of the Honourable East India Company, adopted in 1600, and of the 1775 Continental Union Flag that formed the basis for the modern flag of the United States, and the red, white and blue striped ensign that is the flag of Hawaii.

The first recognisable White Ensign appears to have been in use during the 16th century, consisting of a white field with a broad St George's Cross and a second St. George's Cross in the canton. By 1630 the white ensign consisted of simply a white field, with a small St George's Cross in the canton, which was consistent with the red and blue ensigns of the time. In 1707, the St. George's Cross was reintroduced to the flag as a whole, though not as broad as before, and the Union Flag was placed in the canton. There was also a version of this flag without the overall St George's Cross, which appears to have been for use in home waters only, though this flag appears to have fallen out of use by 1720. In 1801, after the Act of Union 1800, the flag was updated to include the new Union Flag in the canton, and so took on the form as used today. The blue field of the Union Flag was darkened at this time at the request of the Admiralty, in the hope that the new flags would not require replacing as often as the previous design, due to fading of the blue. Throughout this period, the proportions of the flags changed. In 1687, the then Secretary of the Admiralty, Samuel Pepys, instructed that flags be of the ratio 11:18 (18 inches long for each breadth, 11 inches at the time). In the early 18th century, the breadth of cloth had been reduced to 10 inches, so the flags became 5:9. In 1837, the breadth was reduced for the final time to 9 inches, giving the current ratio of 1:2.

Throughout this period in the history of the Royal Navy, the White Ensign was one of three ensigns in use, with each one being assigned to one of the three squadrons of the navy, according to its colour (red, white and blue, with red being the most senior and blue the least). Ships flew the colour of ensign corresponding to the squadron to which they were attached, which was in turn determined by the seniority of the admiral under whose command the ship sailed (a rear admiral of the red was senior to a rear admiral of the white).

In 1864 the Admiralty decided to end the ambiguity caused by the Red Ensign being both a civil ensign and a naval ensign, and the White Ensign was reserved to the Royal Navy; the relevant Order in Council retained the option to use Red or Blue Ensigns in HM Ships if desired.

Tudor Ensign
1485–1603

Stuart Royal Navy Squadron Ensign
1620

English White Ensign
1630–1702
White Squadron Ensign
1702–1707

British White Ensign
1707–1800

== Current use ==
=== United Kingdom (including British Overseas Territories and Crown Dependencies) ===
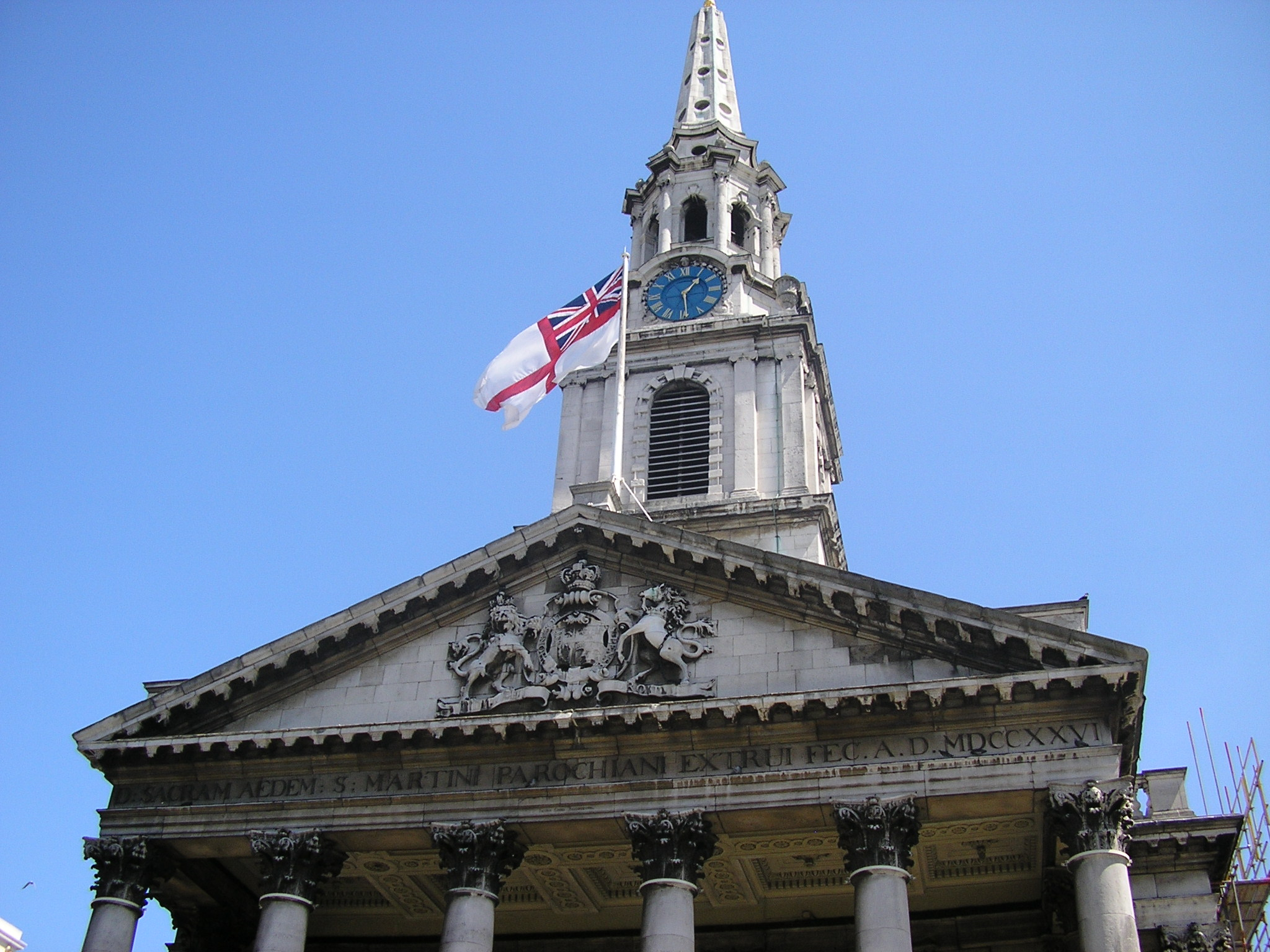
The White Ensign flying from St Martin-in-the-Fields church in Trafalgar Square, London.

The Navy Royal inaugurated squadron colours during the reign of Elizabeth I (1558-1603) to subdivide the English fleet into three squadrons. There were three classes of admirals and differentiated by using coloured flags. There would be three Commanders titled, in order of precedence, as Admiral of the Red Squadron, Admiral of the White Squadron, and Admiral of the Blue Squadron. These were abolished as promotional ranks in 1864.

Royal Navy ships and submarines wear the White Ensign at all times when underway on the surface. The White Ensign may also be worn on a gaff, and may be shifted to the starboard yardarm when at sea. When alongside, the White Ensign is worn at the stern, with the Union Jack flag flown as a jack at the bow, during daylight hours. The logo of Royal Navy features a waving White Ensign at the top.

The White Ensign is worn at the mastheads when Royal Navy ships are dressed on special occasions such as the King's birthday, and may be similarly be worn by foreign warships when in British waters when dressed in honour of a British holiday or when firing a salute to British authorities. The White Ensign may also be worn by the boats of commissioned ships. Yachts of the Royal Yacht Squadron and the Trinity House vessels when escorting the British Monarch (King or Queen of the United Kingdom) are also permitted to wear the White Ensign.

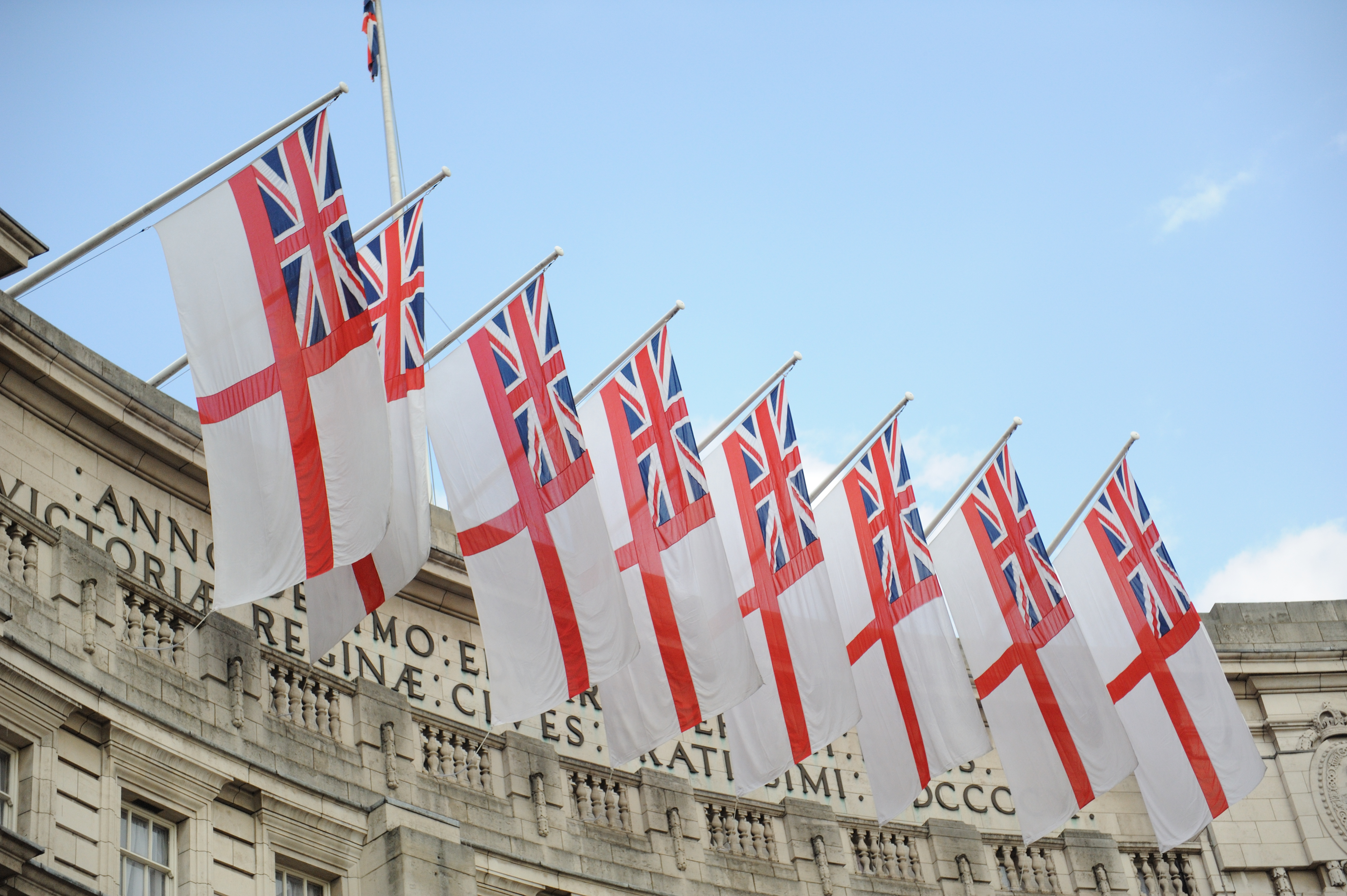
Admiralty Arch in Trafalgar Square of London is customarily decorated with white ensigns on state occasions such as this St. George's Day in 2011

On land, the White Ensign is flown at all naval shore establishments (which are commissioned warships), including all Royal Marines establishments. Permission has been granted to some other buildings with naval connections to fly the White Ensign. This includes the St Martin-in-the-Fields Anglican Church in Trafalgar Square, London, which is the parish church of the Admiralty. The Ensign is also displayed on the Cenotaph alongside the Union Jack flag (for the British Army) and the Royal Air Force Ensign, in memory of the dead in the World Wars. Special permission was granted to any individual or body to fly the White Ensign to mark Trafalgar Day and the victory in the naval Battle of Trafalgar on its 201st anniversary in 2006.

The U.S. Navy destroyer Winston S. Churchill is the only U.S. warship to fly the White Ensign along with the Stars and Stripes to honour her British namesake, the former prime minister. Isambard Kingdom Brunel's SS Great Britain, although a merchant ship, appears to have worn (and still bears and flies, preserved in dry dock as a historical exhibit/museum ship) the White Ensign, apparently because its first master (an ex-Royal Navy man) brought it with him.

=== Commonwealth of Nations ===
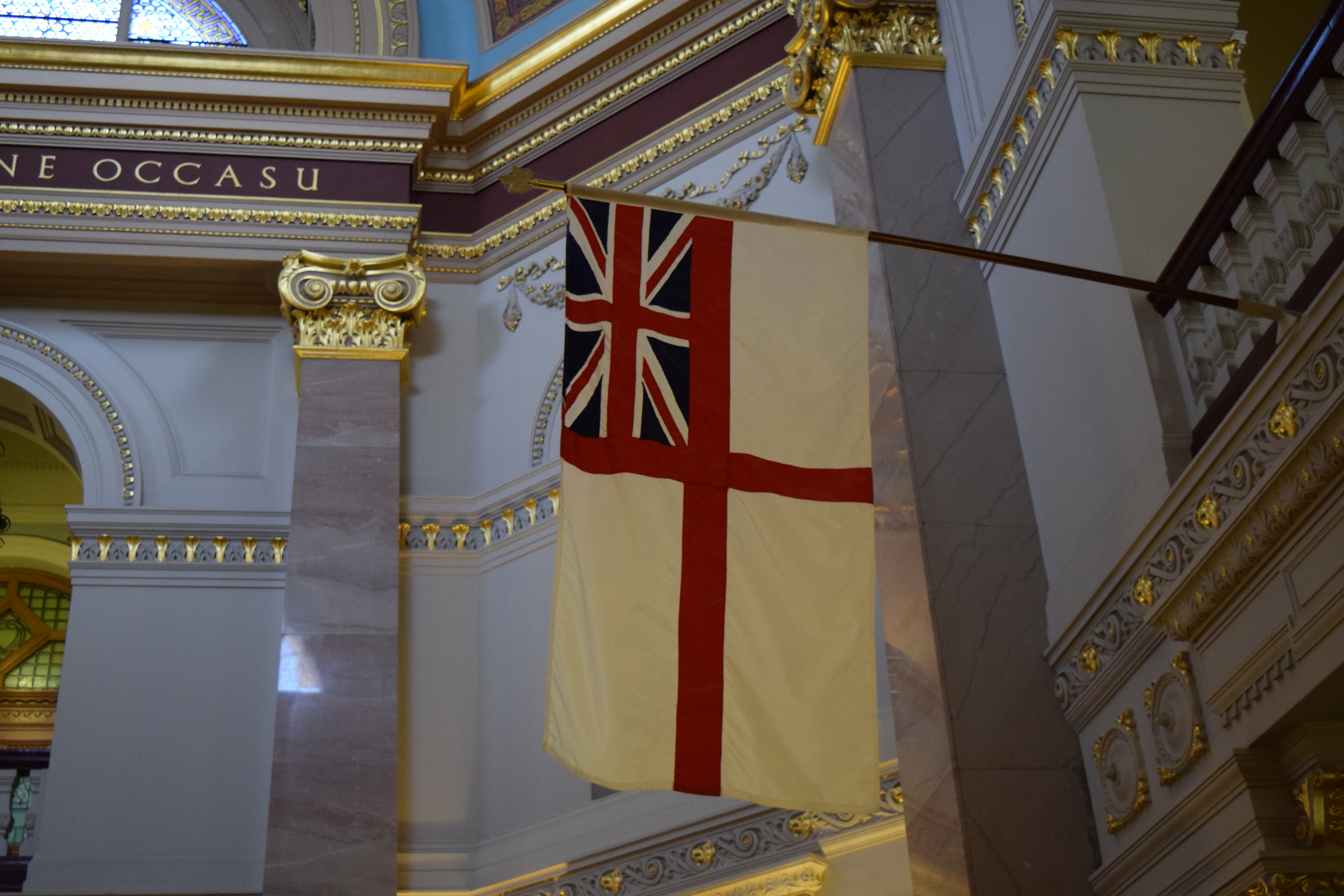
The White Ensign hanging in the British Columbia Parliament Buildings

The White Ensign was historically used, in its unaltered form, by the naval forces of Australia, Canada and New Zealand, with the Blue Ensign of each of these Dominions (as they were then known) as a jack. In 1965, with the adoption of the Maple Leaf Canadian flag, Canada stopped using the White Ensign on its naval vessels in favour of the new flag. Following a reorganisation of the Canadian armed forces in 1968, a new "white ensign" was adopted, incorporating the Canadian flag in the canton and a badge in the fly. This flag, however, was until 2013 not used as the ensign, but as the jack, and also as the basis of the sovereign's colours of the Royal Canadian Navy. In May 2013 the Canadian "white ensign" became the ensign and the national flag the jack. Many Canadian veterans' organisations still use the original White and Blue Ensigns unofficially as symbols of history and heritage.

During Australia's involvement in Vietnam, the RAN modified the White Ensign (1967) to create a uniquely Australian ensign which would avoid any confusion with UK vessels; Britain was not involved in the conflict. New Zealand followed suit in 1968. The modified RAN and RNZN White Ensigns incorporate the Union Flag in the first quarter, but with the Southern Cross designs from each national flag (blue stars for the RAN and red stars for the RNZN) replacing St. George's Cross.

Several other Commonwealth navies also use naval ensigns with a visual connection to the White Ensign. For example, the South African Navy have retained a cross on a white field, with their own national flag in the canton, in place of the Union Flag. The Royal Indian Marine (Royal Indian Navy from 1934) used the unaltered White Ensign as its ensign from 1928 until 26 January 1950, when India became a republic within the Commonwealth. After that date, the Royal Indian Navy became the Indian Navy and the Union Jack in the canton was replaced with the Indian tricolour.

Flag	Name	Country	Use
	Australian White Ensign	Australia	Royal Australian Navy
	Bahamas Naval Ensign	The Bahamas	Royal Bahamas Defence Force
	Naval Ensign of Bangladesh	Bangladesh	Bangladesh Navy
	Barbados Naval Ensign	Barbados	Barbados Coast Guard
	Naval Ensign of Brunei	Brunei	Royal Brunei Navy
	Canadian Naval Ensign	Canada	Canadian Forces
	Fijian Naval Ensign	Fiji	Republic of Fiji Navy
	Gambian Naval Ensign	Gambia	Gambia Navy
	Naval Ensign of Ghana	Ghana	Ghana Navy
	Naval Ensign of Grenada	Grenada	Coast Guard of Grenada
	Indian Naval Ensign	India	Indian Navy
	Jamaican Naval Ensign	Jamaica	Jamaica Defence Force Coast Guard
	Naval Ensign of Kenya	Kenya	Kenyan Navy
	Malaysian Naval Ensign	Malaysia	Royal Malaysian Navy
	Namibian Naval Ensign	Namibia	Namibian Navy
	Royal New Zealand Navy Ensign	New Zealand	Royal New Zealand Navy
	Nigerian Naval Ensign	Nigeria	Nigerian Navy
	Papua New Guinea Naval Ensign	Papua New Guinea	Papua New Guinea Defence Force
	Naval Ensign of Saint Kitts and Nevis	Saint Kitts and Nevis	Saint Kitts and Nevis Defence Force
	Sierra Leone Naval Ensign	Sierra Leone	Sierra Leone Navy
	Singapore Naval Ensign	Singapore	Republic of Singapore Navy
	Naval Ensign of the Solomon Islands	Solomon Islands	Solomon Islands Navy
	South African Naval Ensign	South Africa	South African Navy
	Sri Lanka Naval Ensign	Sri Lanka	Sri Lanka Navy
	Tonga Naval Ensign	Tonga	Tongan Maritime Force
	Naval Ensign of Trinidad and Tobago	Trinidad and Tobago	Trinidad and Tobago Coast Guard
	Vanuatu Naval Ensign	Vanuatu	Vanuatu Mobile Forces

=== Other former British colonies ===
Flag	Name	Country	Use
	Naval Ensign of Jordan	Jordan	Royal Jordanian Navy
	Naval Ensign of Myanmar	Myanmar	Myanmar Navy
	Naval Ensign of Sudan	Sudan	Sudanese Navy

=== United States ===
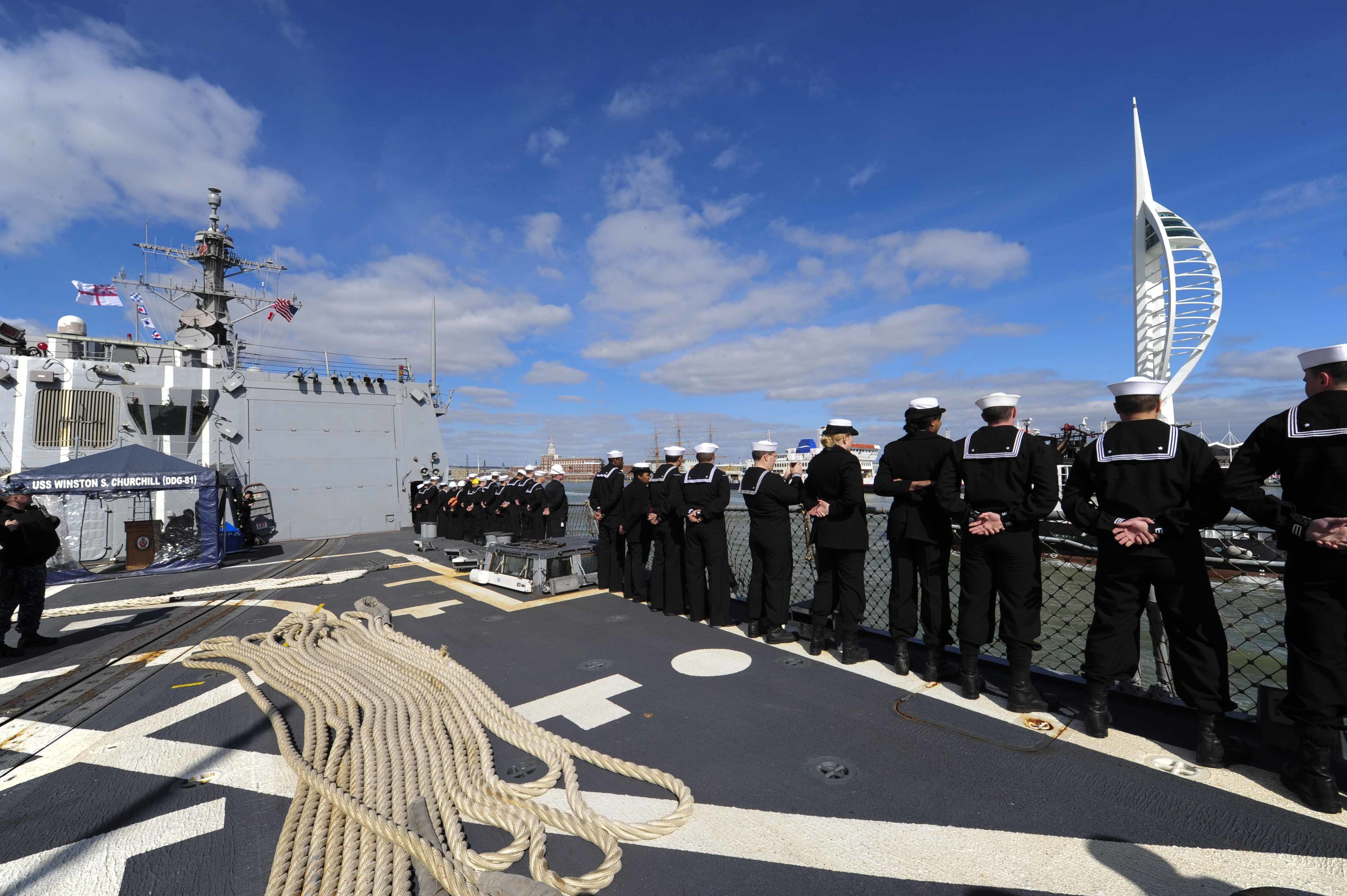
USS Winston S. Churchill

Aside from being flown by the Arleigh Burke-class destroyer USS Winston S. Churchill, the British Naval Ensign is authorised to be used at the HMS Seraph memorial on the campus of The Citadel. The White Ensign also flies over the British Cemetery on Ocracoke, North Carolina, which contains the remains of several seamen from HMT Bedfordshire, as well as a memorial to the lost naval trawler, which was sunk off the coast of Ocracoke Island in May 1942.

=== Non military usage ===
An unofficial British Empire flag from the interwar period

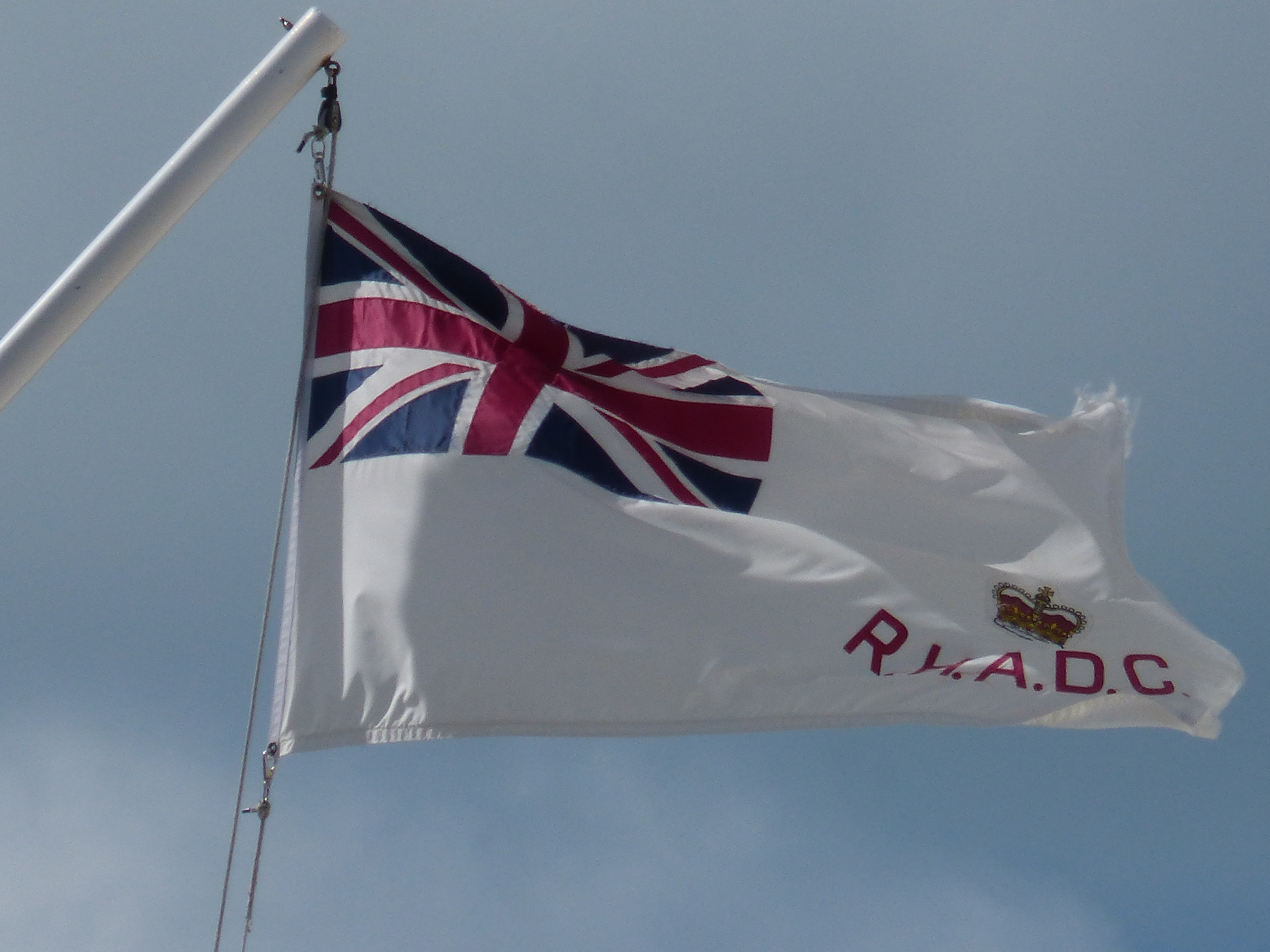
White Ensign of the Royal Hamilton Amateur Dinghy Club of Bermuda

The Flag of the British Antarctic Territory is a white ensign defaced with the territory's coat of arms. This is the only white ensign in use by a British Overseas Territory.

A White Ensign, without Saint Patrick's Saltire, defaced with a blue lighthouse in the fly, is the Commissioners' flag of the Northern Lighthouse Board. This flag is unique as it uses a pre-1801 Union Flag in the canton.

The burgee of the Royal Naval Tot Club of Antigua and Barbuda is sometimes misidentified as a White Ensign; the burgee is a white swallowtail pennant (similar to a Royal Navy Commodore's) with the Union Flag is use until 1801 in the upper hoist canton.

In the 19th and early 20th century, steamers of the Furness Railway on Lake Windemere flew the white ensign "as the admiralty only exercised jurisdiction over the high seas" and "repeated requests from the admiralty to desist were met with polite refusals"

An unofficial white ensign design featuring the royal symbols of the dominions and India was created in the early 20th century to demonstrate the British Empire evolving into a community of nations. It was flown throughout the interwar period for events such as Empire Day and the British Empire Exhibition. The Dangarsleigh War Memorial still flies it on some occasions.

The Bahamas uses a variant of its white ensign, with a blue cross instead of the red Cross of St George found on the naval ensign, as a government and 'non combatant' ensign, serving a similar purpose to the UK's Blue Ensign.

The Royal Hamilton Amateur Dinghy Club of Bermuda uses a white ensign defaced with the red abbreviation R.H.A.D.C. and surmounted by St. Edward's Crown.

The New South Wales Ambulance service uses a white ensign defaced with the badge of the service.

The Sydney Ferries house flag is a variant of the white ensign.

Flag of Picton, Ontario

The flag of Picton, Ontario is a defaced white ensign (pre-1801 Union Jack).

== See also ==
- British ensign
- Maritime flag
