= Dangarsleigh, New South Wales =

Dangarsleigh New South Wales
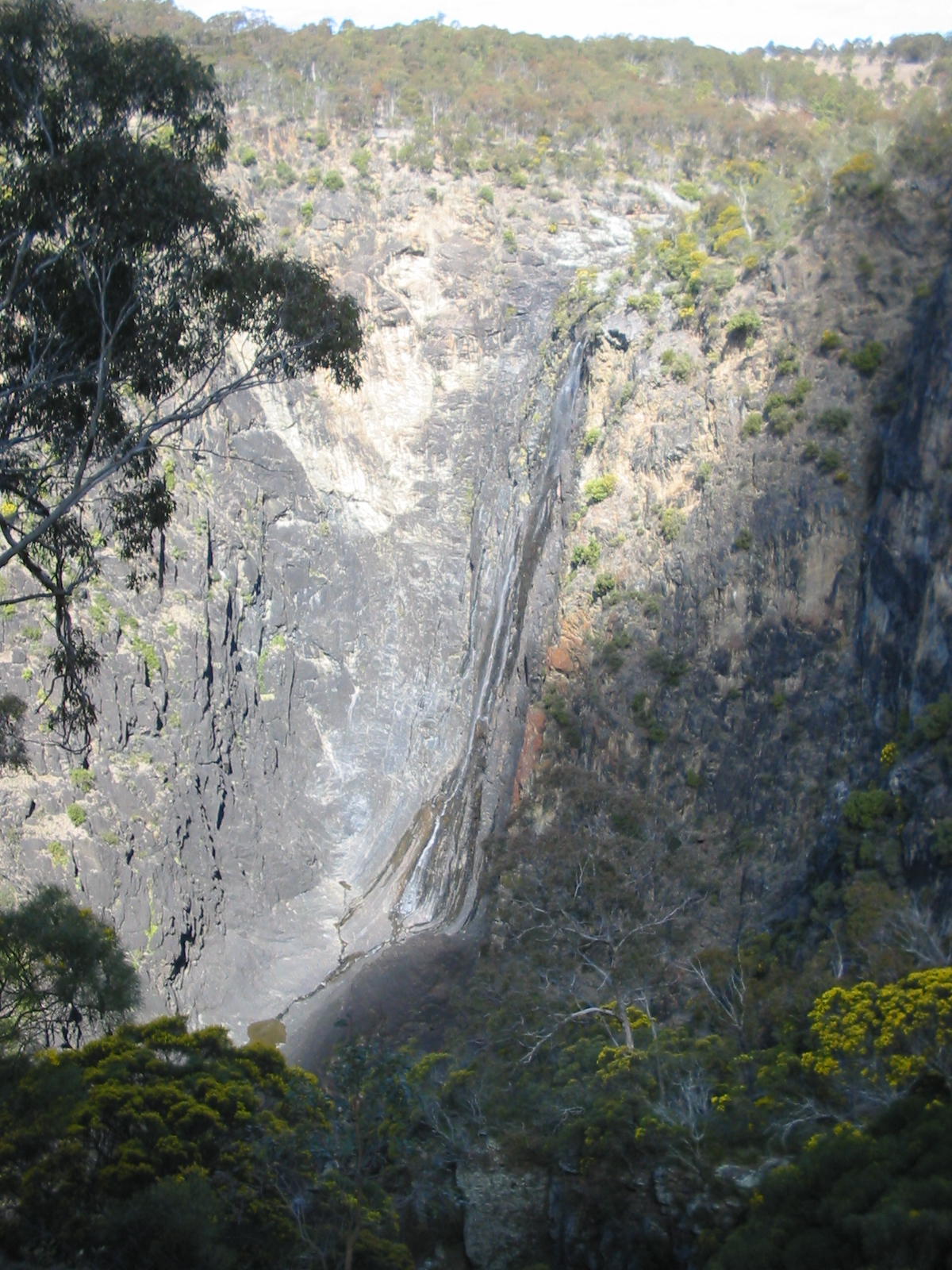
- Dangars Falls and Gorge

- Coordinates: 30°36′S 151°41′E
- Population: 97 (2006 census)
- Postcode(s): 2350
- Elevation: 1,020 m (3,346 ft)
- LGA(s): Armidale Regional Council
- County: Sandon
- State electorate(s): Northern Tablelands
- Federal division(s): New England

Dangarsleigh is a rural locality and minor trigonometrical station about 11 km south east of Armidale, New South Wales. The locality is at an altitude of about 1,020 metres on the Northern Tablelands in the New England region of New South Wales, Australia. The name Dangarsleigh commemorates the surveyor and pastoralist Henry Dangar's name. It is within the Armidale Regional Council local government area and Sandon County.

At the junction of Dangarsleigh Road there is a war memorial erected by the Perrot family in memory of their oldest son, Harold, who was killed at Passchendale Ridge in the First World War. A dirt road leads to the Dangars or Dangarsleigh Falls, at which Salisbury Waters drops 120 metres into the gorge below.

The Kellys Plains-Dangarsleigh Country Women's Association (CWA) meets once a month in the CWA Rooms, Dangarsleigh Road.

In the 2006 census (held on 8 August 2006) there were 97 people usually resident in Dangarsleigh, 47.4% were males and 52.6% were females.

== Dangars Falls ==
Dangars Falls are located 16 km south-south-east of Armidale, on Salisbury Waters. They have a total fall of 120 metres. These falls were previously named Gostwick Falls, and are also known as Dangarsleigh Falls. They are in the Oxley Wild Rivers National Park, at the head of Dangars Gorge.

These falls are often confused with Dangar Falls, near Dorrigo, about 125 km to the east, along the Waterfall Way.

== Heritage listings ==
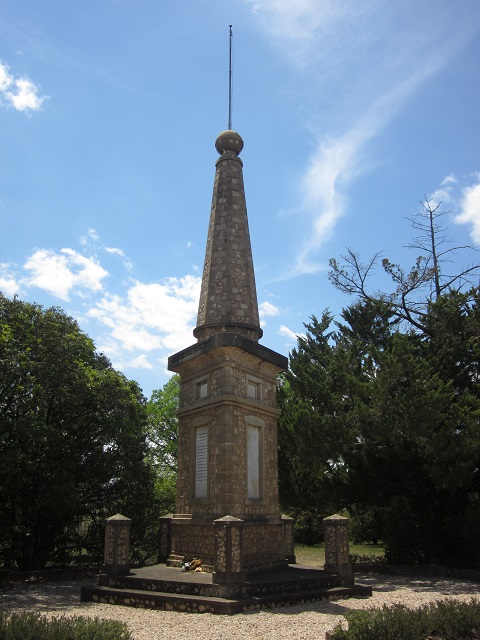
Dangarsleigh War Memorial

Dangarsleigh has a number of heritage-listed sites, including:

- 755 Dangarsleigh Road: Dangarsleigh War Memorial

== See also ==
- Kellys Plains, New South Wales
- Oxley Wild Rivers National Park
