= Flag of the British Antarctic Territory =

British overseas territory flag

- Flag of the British Antarctic Territory
- Use: Civil and state flag
- Proportion: 1:2
- Adopted: 21 April 1998
- Design: A White Ensign with the Union flag in the top left hand corner and the coat of arms of the British Antarctic Territory centre-right.

The flag of the British Antarctic Territory was granted on 21 April 1998. It features the coat of arms granted on 1 August 1963, a year after the British Antarctic Territory, a British Overseas Territory, was created. Previously, the Territory was a part of the Falkland Islands Dependencies and used the same flag. On 30 May 1969, a blue ensign with the British Antarctic Territory coat of arms in the fly was introduced as a government ensign.

== Description ==
The flag is a White Ensign, without a cross, with the Union Flag in the canton, defaced with the coat of arms of the British Antarctic Territory, introduced in 1952. The coat of arms features a lion, representing the United Kingdom, and a penguin, representing the native wildlife. The crest of the coat of arms is the RRS Discovery, which first took Robert Falcon Scott and Ernest Shackleton to Antarctica as part of the British National Antarctic Expedition in 1901. She is currently a museum ship in Dundee. The motto on the coat of arms is "Research and Discovery".

The official description is as follows:

Arms: Per fess wavy barry, wavy of six Argent and Azure, and Argent on a Pile Gules, a Torch enflamed proper.

Supporters: In Dexter a Lion Or and in Sinister an Emperor Penguin proper upon a compartment divided per pale and representing in Dexter a grassy Mount and in Sinister an ice Floe. Motto: Research and Discovery.

This coat of arms was transferred to the B.A.T. on 1 August 1963, with the addition of helm, crest and mantling:

Mantling: in Dexter Or doubled Gules and in Sinister Argent doubled Azure. Crest: Upon a Wreath of the colours of the Mantling a representation of the research Ship Discovery.

== Use and related flags ==
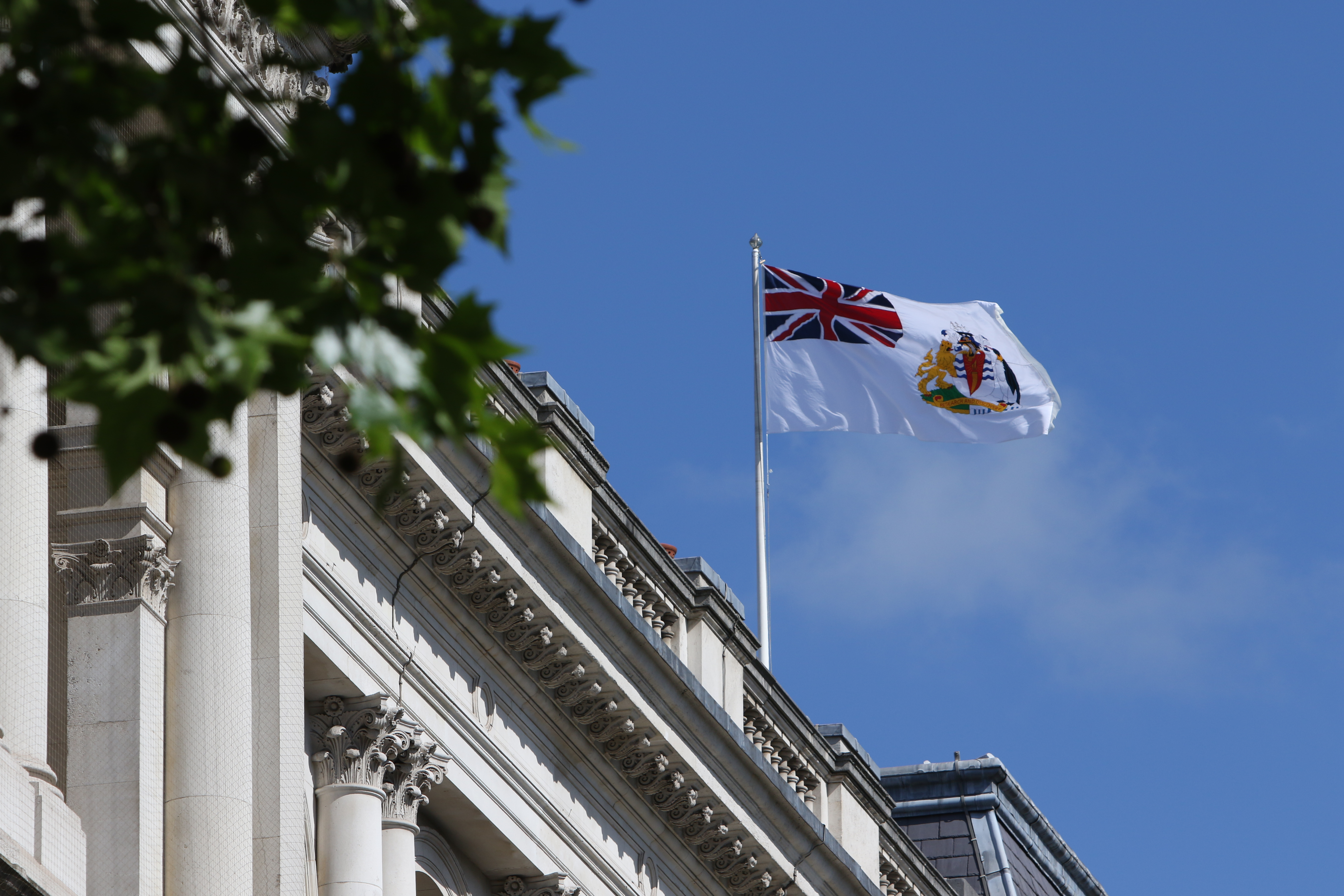
Flag flying over the Foreign and Commonwealth Office in London, 2019

The flag flies over the British research stations in the Territory and at the headquarters of the British Antarctic Survey in Cambridge. Vessels of the British Antarctic Survey use a Blue Ensign defaced with the shield from the coat of arms, which can be seen below. This ensign was introduced by Royal Warrant on 30 May 1969. The flag of the Commissioner for the British Antarctic Territory, a position currently held by Ben Merrick, is also seen below.

The flag is the only flag of any British dependency to have ever used the White Ensign.

== Other flags ==
Government Ensign of the British Antarctic Territory

Flag of the Commissioner for the British Antarctic Territory

== See also ==
- List of flags of the United Kingdom
- List of Antarctic flags
