= Kellys Plains, New South Wales =

Kellys Plains
- Town
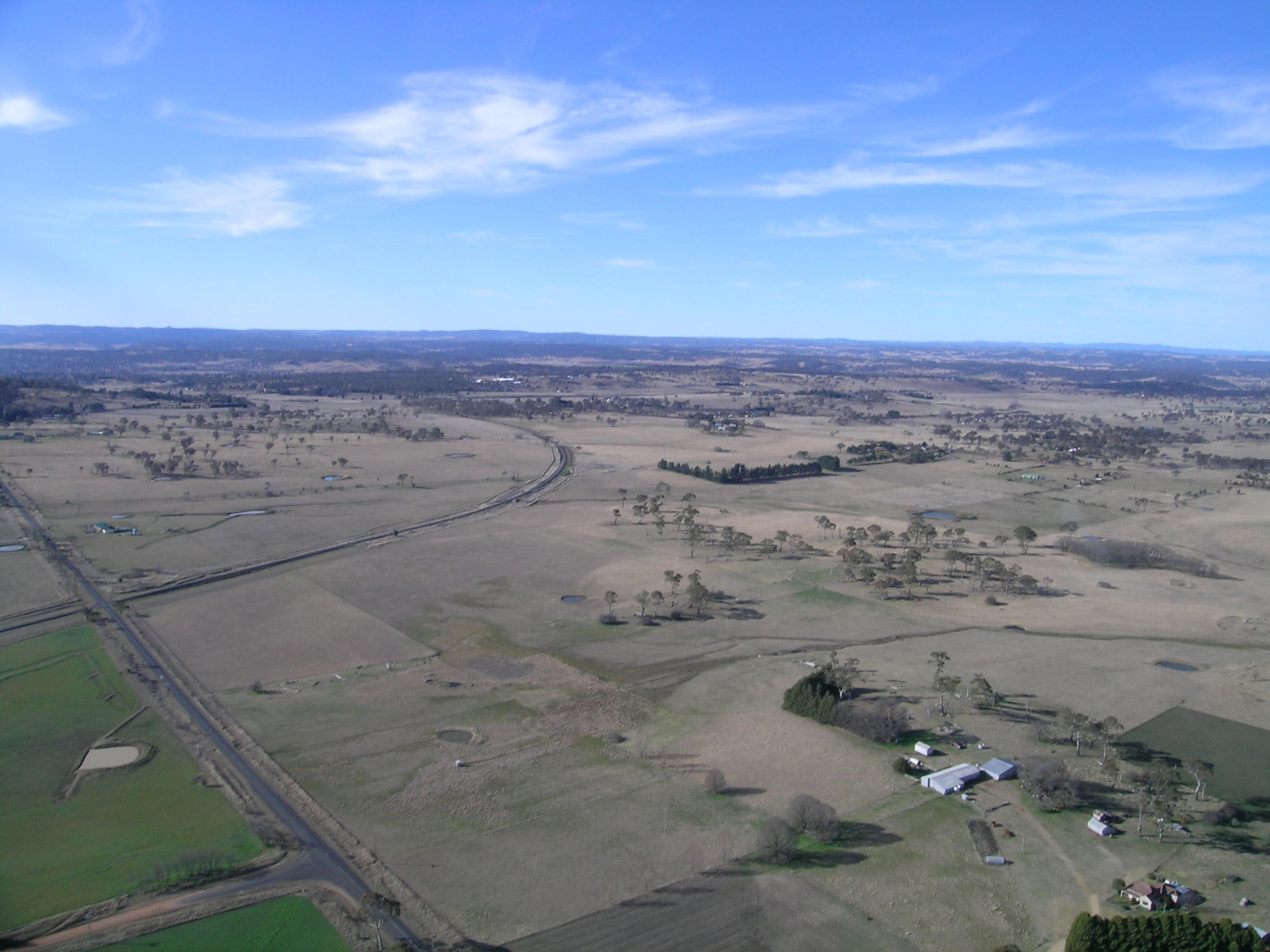
- Kellys Plains

- Coordinates: 30°33′S 151°38′E
- Country: Australia
- State: New South Wales
- LGAs: Armidale Regional Council; Uralla Shire
- Location: 571 km (355 mi) N of Sydney; 8 km (5.0 mi) WSW of Armidale; 21 km (13 mi) NE of Uralla

Government
  - State electorate: Northern Tablelands
  - Federal division: New England
- Elevation: 1,044 m (3,425 ft)

Population
  - Total: 169 (SAL 2021)
- Postcode: 2350
- County: Sandon
- Parish: Saumarez
- Mean max temp: 19.6 °C (67.3 °F)
- Mean min temp: 7.5 °C (45.5 °F)
- Annual rainfall: 816 mm (32.1 in)

Kellys Plains is a small rural locality situated about 8 kilometres west south west of Armidale, New South Wales. The settlement is at an altitude of about 1,044 metres on the Northern Tablelands in the New England region of New South Wales, Australia.

== History ==
Kellys Plains was named after an early settler in the area.

The Kellys Plains Public School is a small school that was established in 1863. The school students are now divided into two classes: kindergarten to year 2, and year 3 to year 6.

On 3 February 1883 the Kellys Plains railway station opened and was closed on 20 February 1975. Kellys Plains Post Office opened on 1 April 1884 and closed in 1945.

St John's Anglican Church original timber building was built in 1896 at Kellys Plains and consecrated in 1897. In 1923 it was replaced by the present brick building. Several members of the Perrott family were buried in the churchyard prior to the construction of the 1923 church and their headstones are the only surviving ones.

The Kellys Plains-Dangarsleigh Country Women's Association meets once a month in the CWA Rooms, Dangarsleigh Road.

Current population of the area is negligible and would be included with that of Dangarsleigh which is about 4 km away. There many small properties and lifestyle blocks in the area with their occupants commuting to nearby towns for work.

== See also ==
- Dangarsleigh, New South Wales

== Kellys Plains railway station ==
Preceding station	Former services	Following station
Armidale towards Wallangarra	Main Northern Line	Uralla towards Sydney
