= Canberra Community News =

Defunct newspaper in Canberra, Australian Capital Territory

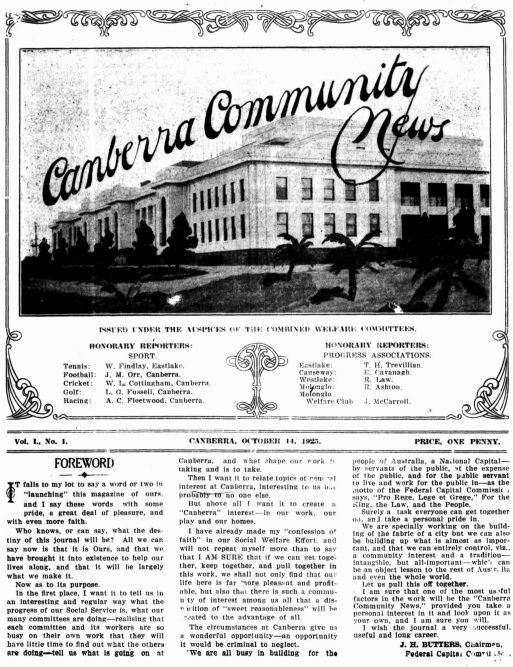
Canberra Community News

Canberra Community News was a newspaper published in Canberra, Australian Capital Territory (then known as the Federal Capital Territory), from 1925 until 1927.

== History ==
The Canberra Community News was first published on 14 October 1925 and continued under the same name until 15 December 1927. It was published monthly by the Council of the Canberra Social Service Association. From Volume 1 Number 3 the publisher changed to the Social Service department, Federal Capital Commission. Some sources state that Volume 2 Issues 4 through 11 were titled Community News, Canberra but the images of these issues show this not to be the case.

== Digitisation ==
The newspaper has been digitised as part of the Australian Newspapers Digitisation Project of the National Library of Australia.

== See also ==
- The Federal Capital Pioneer
- List of newspapers in Australia
