= Grant Dexter =

Canadian journalist (1896–1961)

Alexander Grant Dexter (1896–1961) was a Canadian journalist in the mid-20th century. Dexter spent his entire career with the Winnipeg Free Press, which he joined in 1912 at the age of 16. He served in Lord Strathcona's Horse from 1915 until he was invalided to England in 1917. For many years (1923–1944) he was parliamentary reporter in Ottawa for John Dafoe's Free Press. He served as associate editor of the Free Press from 1946 to 1948, then as editor from 1948 to 1954. Dexter was very well-connected to official Ottawa. He sent detailed memoranda on politics and Ottawa intrigues to his employers. These have been preserved at Queen's University and a collection of his wartime memoranda has been published.
