= The Federal Capital Pioneer =

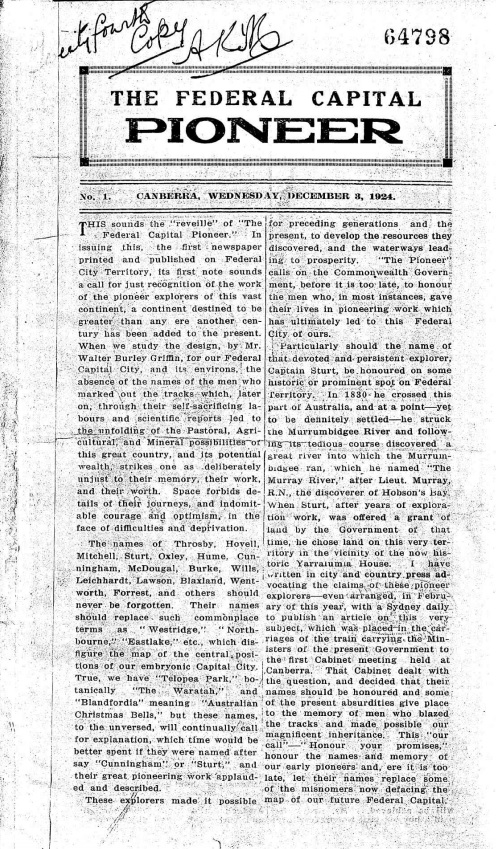
Front page of The Federal Capital Pioneer, Wednesday 3 December 1924

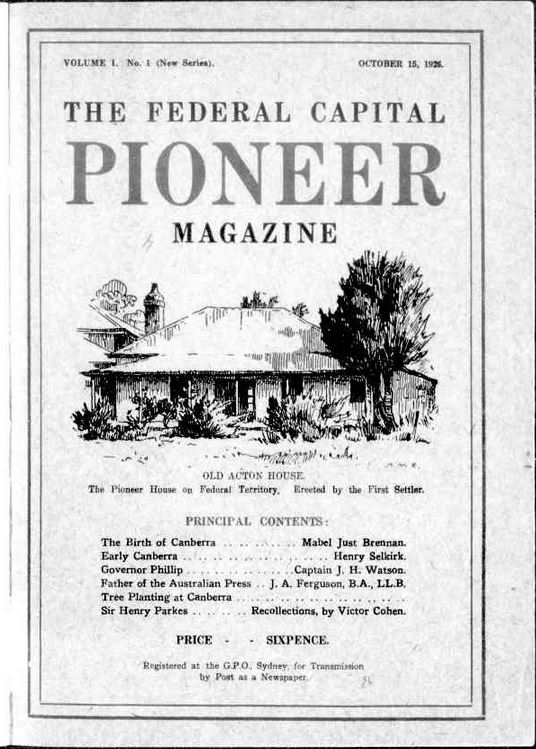
Cover of The Federal Capital Pioneer Magazine, 15 October 1926

The Federal Capital Pioneer, also published as The Federal Capital Pioneer Magazine, was a newspaper published in Canberra, Australia from 1924 to 1927.

== History ==
The Federal Capital Pioneer was published from 3 December 1924 to August 1926 in Canberra. It was then published as The Federal Capital Pioneer Magazine from 15 October 1926 to 20 August 1927.

== Digitisation ==
This newspaper has been digitised as part of the Australian Newspapers Digitisation Program of the National Library of Australia.

== See also ==
- Canberra Community News
- List of newspapers in Australia
