= Coat of arms of the British Antarctic Territory =

Coat of arms

Arms of the British Antarctic Territory
- Shield: Per Fesse wavy barry wavy of six Argent and Azure and Argent on a Pile Gules a Torch enflamed proper
- Supporters: On the dexter side a Lion Or and on the sinister side an Emperor Penguin proper
- Motto: Research and Discovery
- Earlier version
- Use: Coat of arms of the Falkland Islands Dependencies

The coat of arms of the British Antarctic Territory are the official coat of arms for the British Antarctic Territory was first granted in 1952, when the territory was still a dependency of the Falkland Islands (along with South Georgia and the South Sandwich Islands).

== History ==
The coat of arms were first awarded in 1952 to each of the constituent members of Falkland Island Dependencies, which the British Antarctic Territory was a part. This was the first grant of arms made by Queen Elizabeth II after her accession to the throne. The arms consist of a shield bearing a flaming torch on a wavy background representing the sea. The dexter supporter is a golden lion, representing the United Kingdom. The sinister supporter is an Emperor penguin, representing the native wildlife in the territory. The lion stands on a compartment of grass, while the penguin stands on a compartment of ice. The crest is a representation of the RRS Discovery, the research ship used in 1901 by the caption Robert Falcon Scott on his first journey to the Antarctic. The motto "Research and Discovery" was chosen as a reference to historical British Antarctic explorers and its current status as a marine science research base.

The coat of arms appears in the fly of the flag of the British Antarctic Territory.

== Official description ==
The official blazon granted by the British College of Arms is as follows:

Arms: Per Fesse wavy barry wavy of six Argent and Azure and Argent on a Pile Gules a Torch enflamed proper.

Supporters: On the dexter side a Lion Or and on the sinister side an Emperor Penguin proper.

Motto: Research and Discovery

== See also ==
- List of coats of arms of the United Kingdom and dependencies
- Coat of arms of the Falkland Islands
