= Dangarsleigh War Memorial =

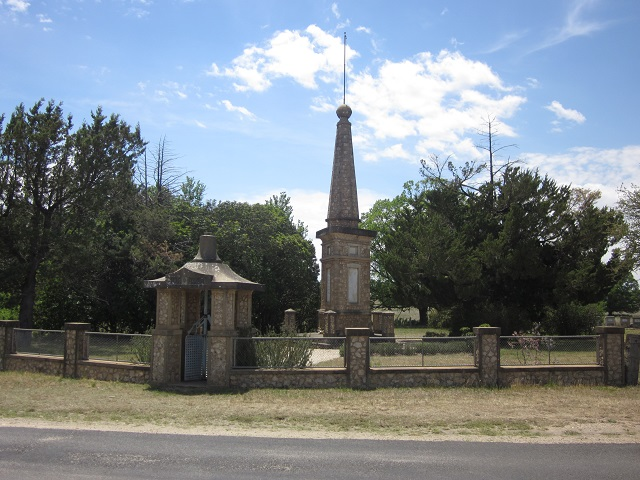
- Dangarsleigh War Memorial

- Location within New South Wales Location within Australia
- 30.5925°S 151.6850°E
- Location: 755 Dangarsleigh Road, Dangarsleigh, Armidale Regional Council, New South Wales, Australia

History
- Built: 1920–1921

Site notes
- Architect: Alfred Haroldston Perrott (Senior)
- Owner: Armidale Dumaresq Council

New South Wales Heritage Register
- Official name: Dangarsleigh War Memorial
- Type: state heritage (built)
- Designated: 20 May 2016
- Reference no.: 1970
- Type: War Memorial
- Category: Monuments and Memorials
- Builders: Mark Roberts

Dangarsleigh War Memorial is a heritage-listed World War I memorial at 755 Dangarsleigh Road, Dangarsleigh in the New England region of New South Wales, Australia. It was designed by Alfred Haroldston Perrott (Senior) and built from 1920 to 1921 by Mark Roberts. The property is owned by the Armidale Regional Council. It was added to the New South Wales State Heritage Register on 20 May 2016.

== History ==
The news of the outbreak of war between Britain and Germany in 1914 was received with great enthusiasm in Australia and an overwhelming number of volunteers enlisted to provide allied support in the conflict. With a population of less than five million people, over 400,000 Australian men enlisted and were sent to war with great fanfare and support from a proud Australian community.

It was not long before the impact of the Great War was felt at home. With so many men overseas and the loss of life growing with each day, the physical and financial burden on the shoulders of Australian families grew heavier. By the end of the war, and calculated by head of population, Australia had suffered a higher casualty rate than any other allied nation.

Adding to the grief of the Australian community was the absence of the bodies of those who had perished. Within months of the war breaking out, Britain repatriated the first (and the last) body back to Australia - that of Major-General Sir William Throsby Bridges. As Britain had decided not to return other bodies to Australia, the laying of Major-General Bridges to rest in the nation's capital was an event that became a substitute funeral for each Australian soldier that had fallen on foreign soil during the war. All other Australian soldiers killed in battle were buried in the country in which they died.

Without the physical remains of their loved ones, the Australian community sought alternative ways to process their losses and articulate their grief and war memorials became a popular form of public commemoration. Memorials were a physical expression of the grief of the Australian community but they were also monuments that expressed the community's pride and gratitude for the heroic efforts shown by their men. They were to be dignified structures, suited to the purpose of commemoration and appropriate in expression. Memorials were not to glorify war or be sentimental in character but rather were to be worthy of representing the men killed in action and for their courageous efforts fighting in the Great War. War memorials provided a public outlet for mourning and helped to close the geographical gap between those buried overseas and their bereaved families at home.

Due to the casualty rate in the Great War and the need to provide commemorative places for the community, the Government of New South Wales established the War Memorials' Advisory Board in 1919 to provide advice to the community and to the Minister for Local Government on the appropriateness of proposed public memorials. Made up of representatives of the National Art Gallery Trust, the Institute of Architects of NSW, the Royal Art Society of NSW, the Society of Artists and the Town Planning Association of NSW, the board considered the aesthetic merit of memorials proposed by the community and sought stylistic consistency throughout the state.

In NSW, war memorials often took one of the following forms - soldier statue, column, obelisk, fountain, archway, gateway, tree avenues or gardens. Of these forms, the obelisk was the most popular memorial because it was a relatively simple shape that was easily constructed with little consideration needed for design (as required in other memorials, particularly the soldier statues). Furthermore, the obelisk was a recognisable form (having long-held associations with notions of glory, death and eternity).

Although most memorials were an initiative of a community or organisation, a Dangarsleigh family, in the Northern Tablelands of NSW, sought to memorialise their private loss by designing and commissioning a memorial of their own. Dedicating a corner of their property, "Chevy Chase", for the project, the memorial would be built to commemorate the loss of their eldest son, Alfred Haroldston Perrott (junior) (1889-1917) who had been killed in action at Passchendaele Ridge, Belgium. To honour their son and fulfil his own promise upon deployment to the war to erect such a memorial if he was spared, the Perrott family designed and commissioned an obelisk monument of such scale and quality that it soon became a war memorial for the greater region and an expression of grief and gratitude to all of the local men who went to war.

Commenced in October 1920, seven months of intensive construction work resulted in a substantial concrete and stone monument that has since been described as "the most elaborate memorial in the country". Intricately designed by Alfred Haroldston Perrott (senior), the memorial (when interpreted from its base upwards) symbolises the British Empire and Australia's role as an ally in the Great War. Surrounded by five pillars representing the dominions of the British Empire (being Australia, New Zealand, South Africa, Canada and India), the memorial has a triangular plinth representing England, Ireland and Scotland. Atop this is an octagonal spire (representing the eight countries united) and this is crowned with a sphere that represents the globe. Each of these elements of the war memorial flew a flag for the country represented. The dominions had their ensigns, and the countries of the British Isles flew their royal standards. Above the globe was a United Empire flag which contained the symbols of all eight nations together.

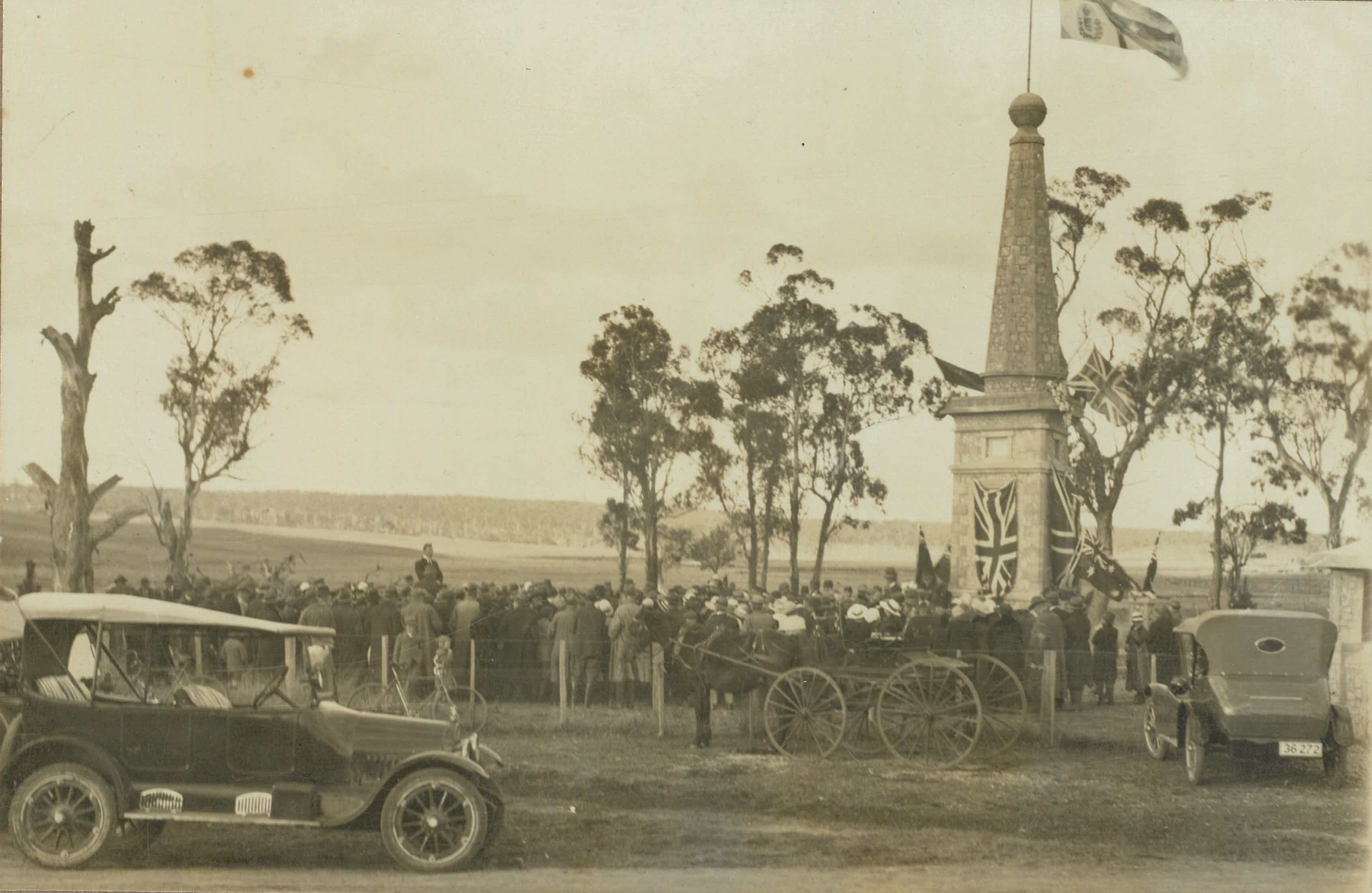
A photograph from the opening of the war memorial in May 1921

Although the concept for the monument may have originated as a private expression of loss, the Dangarsleigh War Memorial soon became a structure reflecting the bereavement and pride of the wider community. In its construction, many local people helped in the building works and in providing and carting materials to the site. Upon the laying of the foundation stone in February 1921, local memorabilia selected by the community (including newspaper articles, literature, coins, Aboriginal artefacts, clay pipes and heads of wheat, barley and oats and three glass jars filled with letters, photographs and mementos sent home from local soldiers during the war) were installed in a small hollow chamber within the memorial as a form of time capsule. When the memorial was formally opened and dedicated in May 1921, the marble slabs of the obelisk were inscribed with the names of 16 local men who served (and some who died) in the Great War.

Some years later in 1936, the memorial was enclosed with a brick and stone fence with wire mesh infill panels that incorporated much of the symbolism and thought that was demonstrated in the construction of the obelisk monument. The centrepiece of the fence is a lych gate entrance with a concrete and stone temple-like turnstile gateway that bears the Buddhist word of "Nirvana". The entrance is topped by a bell and incorporates blue tiles donated from the St Mary and St Joseph Catholic Cathedral at Armidale. The handles of the turnstile are inlaid with symbols of the navy and army.

Perhaps a reflection of the personal importance the Dangarsleigh War Memorial had to the Perrott family, a number of the members of the family have been buried at the site. The designer of the monument, Alfred Haroldston Perrott (senior) and his wife Mabel (both the parents of Alfred Haroldston Perrott (junior)) were buried on the site (in 1934 and 1942 respectively). Later burials on the site include Roy Leeson Perrott (d. 1962), Lillian Sylvia Benson Perrott (d. 2001) and Roy Alfred Perrott (d. 2010).

Held by the Perrott family for many years, the Dangarsleigh War Memorial was ceremoniously entrusted to the care of Armidale Dumaresq Council (now Armidale Regional Council) in 1991. Formally handed over by the then Premier of NSW, Nick Greiner, the council is now the guardian of the memorial which keeps "forever green the memory of those poor boys who would never return".

== Description ==
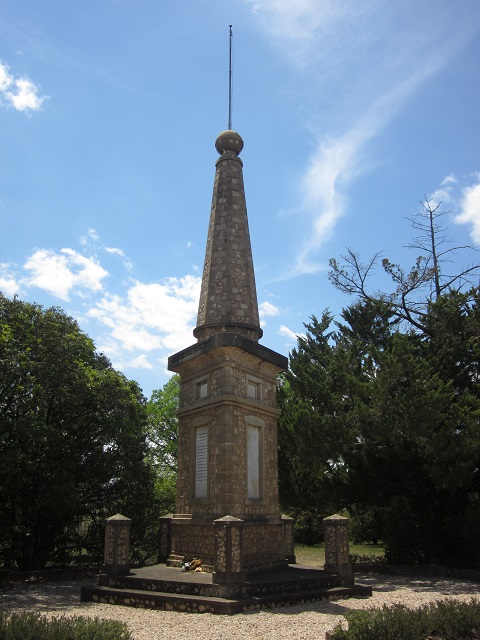
Dangarsleigh War Memorial

The Dangarsleigh War Memorial is an elaborate concrete and stone obelisk on a raised plinth with an octagonal spire. The Interwar design of the monument has Middle Eastern influences and contains numerous symbolic elements that reflect World War I and the related commemoration that followed.

At the base of the monument are five pillars representing the five dominions of the British Empire (Australia, New Zealand, South Africa, Canada and India). The triangular shape of the monument represents England, Ireland and Scotland. The octagonal spire represents the eight countries united. The monument is topped by a circle and globe which represents the world.

The monument contains inlaid marble slabs which are inscribed with names of some 17 local men killed in World War I.

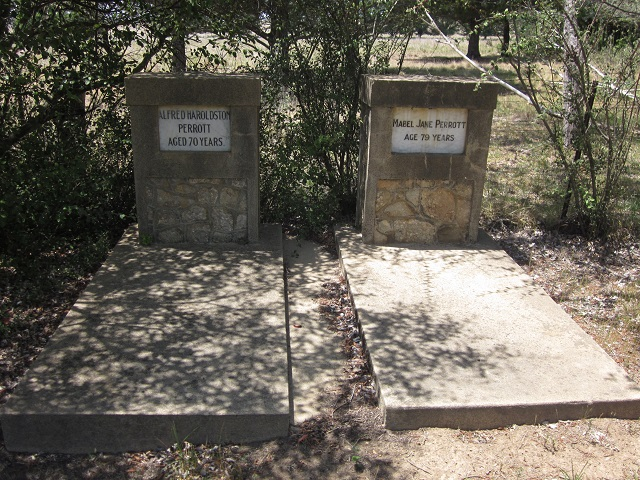
Perrott family graves

Adjacent to the memorial are five gravesites and headstones of members of the Perrott family (including the designer and commissioner of the memorial, Alfred Haroldston Perrott).

Adjacent to the memorial is an information shelter (erected in 1997).

The monument location is enclosed by a brick and stone fence (1936) with wire mesh infill panels and lychgate entrance with cupola roof. The lychgate entrance is a concrete and stone temple-like turnstile gateway that bears the Buddhist word of "Nirvana". The entrance is topped by a bell and incorporates blue tiles donated from the Saints Mary and Joseph Catholic Cathedral, Armidale. The handles of the turnstile are inlaid with symbols of the navy and army.

=== Condition ===
As at 22 October 2015, the Dangarsleigh War Memorial and site was reported to be in very good condition due to regular care and maintenance by the land owner, Armidale Dumaresq Council.

The Dangarsleigh War Memorial is highly intact, being unaltered since its construction in 1921. The only alterations to the general site have been the construction of the surrounding fence (built in similar materials in 1936) and the information shelter in 1997. Despite alterations to the site, the memorial structure remains the visually dominant element of the site.

=== Modifications and dates ===
- 1934 - Grave site installed for Alfred Haroldston Perrott (senior)
- 1936 - Brick, stone and mesh fence and lych gate constructed to enclose memorial
- 1942 - Grave site installed for Mabel Jane Perrott
- 1962 - Grave site installed for Roy Leeson Haroldston Perrott
- 1997 - Information shelter constructed onsite
- 2001 - Grave site installed for Lillian Sylvia Benson Perrott
- 2010 - Grave site installed for Roy Alfred Haroldston Perrott

== Heritage listing ==
The Dangarsleigh War Memorial is of state heritage significance as a rare example of a privately designed and commissioned monument in NSW honouring the service of the Australian men during World War I and the great loss of life that was experienced across the country.

Unlike other memorials that were aimed towards a more general audience, the erection of the obelisk at Dangarsleigh was a public demonstration of the bereavement of a private family. Designed and commissioned by a father to honour a lost son, the Dangarsleigh War Memorial is of state heritage significance for its elaborate and considered design and incorporation of symbolism and decoration that reflect the British Empire and Australia's role as an ally in the Great War of World War I.

A particularly fine example of a memorial type that is commonly found across the state - the obelisk - the Dangarsleigh War Memorial is of state heritage significance as a representative example of a memorial for shared mourning and commemoration which continues to be evident in its ANZAC Day services each year.

Dangarsleigh War Memorial was listed on the New South Wales State Heritage Register on 20 May 2016 having satisfied the following criteria.

The place is important in demonstrating the course, or pattern, of cultural or natural history in New South Wales.

The Dangarsleigh War Memorial is of state heritage significance as a rare example of a privately designed and commissioned monument in NSW honouring the service of the Australian men during World War I and the great loss of life that was experienced across the country.

Unlike other memorials that were aimed towards a more general audience, the erection of the obelisk at Dangarsleigh was a public demonstration of the bereavement of a private family. Designed and commissioned by a father to honour a lost son, the memorial was soon expanded to the wider community and additional names inscribed on the memorial. Dangarsleigh War Memorial became a communal place of shared mourning and commemoration which continues to be evident in its ANZAC Day services each year.

The place has a strong or special association with a person, or group of persons, of importance of cultural or natural history of New South Wales's history.

The Dangarsleigh War Memorial is of local heritage significance for its direct association with the locally significant Perrott family and the Chevy Chase property. Furthermore, the memorial is of local significance for its association with those local serviceman inscribed on the memorial.

The place is important in demonstrating aesthetic characteristics and/or a high degree of creative or technical achievement in New South Wales.

The Dangarsleigh War Memorial is of state heritage significance for its aesthetic values. Unlike other memorials that were aimed towards a more general audience (achieved by using generic design language), the Dangarsleigh War Memorial is an elaborately designed and embellished monument that has been achieved through detailed consideration of symbolism and decoration. Privately designed and commissioned, the aesthetic form of the Dangarsleigh War Memorial reflects the British Empire and Australia's role as an ally in the Great War of World War I.

The place has strong or special association with a particular community or cultural group in New South Wales for social, cultural or spiritual reasons.

The Dangarsleigh War Memorial is of local heritage significance as a community gathering place for the annual ANZAC Day memorial services.

The place has potential to yield information that will contribute to an understanding of the cultural or natural history of New South Wales.

The Dangarsleigh War Memorial is of local heritage significance for the collection of local materials and memorabilia interred within the memorial on the day of the laying of its foundation stone on 21 February 1921. Materials have been reported to include newspaper articles, literature, coins, Aboriginal artefacts, clay pipes and heads of wheat, barley and oats. Additionally, the interment contains three glass jars filled with letters, photographs and mementos sent home from local soldiers during World War I.

The place possesses uncommon, rare or endangered aspects of the cultural or natural history of New South Wales.

Amongst the wealth of war memorials in NSW commissioned by state and local governments as communal places of conflict-related grief and commemoration, the Dangarsleigh War Memorial is of state heritage significance as one of only three privately commissioned World War I memorials identified in the state. Although similar in intent, Dangarsleigh War Memorial is rare compared to others due to its elaborate and considered design and incorporation of symbolic elements that demonstrate Australia's role in the Great War and position within the British Empire.

The place is important in demonstrating the principal characteristics of a class of cultural or natural places/environments in New South Wales.

The Dangarsleigh War Memorial is of state heritage significance as a particularly fine example of a memorial type that is commonly found across the state - the obelisk. Obelisks were the most popular form of memorial in NSW due to its recognisable form and the ease and relatively low cost of construction but it was the embellishment that was applied to this common design is what set each memorial apart.

The Dangarsleigh War Memorial shares the same function and community value as many other World War I memorials around NSW but it is its embellishment and symbolic detail that makes it a particularly fine representative example of the obelisk form.
