= National symbols of Nigeria =

The national symbols of Nigeria represent the country's identity, heritage, and values, and they include the national flag, coat of arms, anthem, and pledge, as well as the national flower, animal, currency, and other national emblems. The Nigerian flag, designed in 1959 by Michael Taiwo Akinkunmi, features three vertical stripes of green and white, symbolising agriculture and peace, respectively. The coat of arms, adopted in 1960, includes a black shield with a wavy white pall, symbolising the meeting of the Niger and Benue Rivers, supported by two white horses representing dignity. Above the shield is an eagle, symbolising strength, and beneath it is Nigeria's national motto: "Unity and Faith, Peace and Progress". The national anthem, "Nigeria, We Hail Thee", first adopted in 1960, relinquished in 1978, and then re-adopted in 2024, calls upon Nigerians to stand in brotherhood and serve their motherland. The national pledge, introduced in 1976, serves as an oath of allegiance and commitment to Nigeria's unity and development. The national flower, Costus spectabilis, symbolises beauty and prosperity, while the national animal, the eagle, reflects the country's strength and vision. The Naira, Nigeria's national currency, was introduced in 1973. Through these symbols, Nigeria's government and its people express their collective pride, uphold their cultural values, and reinforce their commitment to national development and cohesion.

== List of national and official symbols ==
National and official symbols of Nigeria
Symbol	Name	Image	Adopted	Notes
Official name	Federal Republic of Nigeria (Nijeriya, Naìjíríyà, Nàìjíríà)	Map of Nigeria	October 1963	The official name of Nigeria, "Federal Republic of Nigeria", was adopted in 1963 when the country became a republic, three years after gaining independence from the United Kingdom in 1960. The adoption of the name signified Nigeria's transition from a British colony to a fully sovereign state. The term "Federal" reflects Nigeria's structure as a federation of 36 states and the Federal Capital Territory, whereas "Republic" indicates its system of government in which officials are elected and the country is considered a public matter.
National flag	Flag of Nigeria	National flag of Nigeria	1 October 1960	The national flag of Nigeria was designed in 1959 by Michael Taiwo Akinkunmi, a 23-year-old student, following a nationwide competition. The flag was officially adopted on 1 October 1960, the day Nigeria gained independence from British colonial rule. It features three vertical stripes, with green on the outer bands and white in the middle. The green stripes represent Nigeria's vegetation and its agricultural industry, symbolising the nation's wealth in natural resources, and the white stripe stands for peace and unity.
National emblem	Coat of Arms of Nigeria	Coat of Arms of Nigeria	May 1960	The Coat of Arms of Nigeria was officially adopted in 1960, coinciding with the country's independence from British rule. The coat of arms features a black shield with a wavy white pall, symbolising the confluence of the Niger and Benue Rivers at Lokoja. The black shield represents Nigeria's fertile soil, while the wavy white pall signifies the country's rich water resources. Supporting the shield are two white horses, symbolising dignity. At the top of the shield, an eagle is perched, representing strength, while a wreath in the national colours of green and white surrounds it, symbolising Nigeria's rich agricultural heritage. Beneath the shield is Nigeria's national motto: "Unity and Faith, Peace and Progress" (formerly "Peace, Unity, Freedom") which was adopted in 1978. The coat of arms also includes a representation of the Costus spectabilis, Nigeria's national flower, which stands for beauty and the lush environment of the country.
National motto	"Unity and Faith, Peace and Progress" (formerly "Peace, Unity, Freedom")	Coat of Arms of Nigeria	May 1960	
National constitution	Constitution of the Federal Republic of Nigeria	First constitution of Nigeria, which was adopted in 1922	1999 (current)	The Constitution of the Federal Republic of Nigeria establishes the legal and institutional framework that governs the country. It sets out the fundamental laws, rights, and obligations that apply to all Nigerian citizens. The current constitution, which was adopted in 1999, defines the structure of the government, the separation of powers among the executive, legislative, and judicial branches, and outlines the roles and responsibilities of each. It also guarantees fundamental human rights and freedoms, such as the right to life, freedom of speech, and freedom of religion, while providing for the enforcement of these rights through the judicial system. Compliance with the constitution is a duty for all citizens, and its principles and institutions are to be respected and upheld by everyone.
Passport	Nigerian passport	Nigerian Passport	Introduced in 1948 (current version issued in 2007)	The Nigerian passport is an official travel document issued by the Federal Government of Nigeria to its citizens for international travel. It serves as proof of identity and nationality, containing personal information about the bearer, including their name, date of birth, place of birth, gender, and photograph. The Nigerian passport is available in three types: the standard passport, the official passport, and the diplomatic passport, each designated for different categories of citizens and government officials. In 2007, Nigeria introduced the biometric e-passport, which includes a chip that stores the holder's data and enhances security against forgery and identity theft. The passport is essential for Nigerian citizens travelling internationally and is required for visa applications to other countries.
National identity card	Nigerian National Identity Card		Launched in 1979, revamped in 2014	The Nigerian National Identity Card initiative was first conceived in 1967 under the regime of Yakubu Gowon to identify individuals, particularly those who did not return to their regions during the Nigerian Civil War. Although the project faced several delays, it was officially launched on 1 September 1979, by the Obasanjo military administration, following the establishment of the Directorate of National Civil Registration (DNCR) in 1978. Throughout the 1980s and 1990s, successive governments attempted to implement and restart the identity card system, with multiple contracts awarded to both local and international companies. However, these efforts were often hampered by administrative changes, political instability, and corruption scandals. A major overhaul of the identity card system took place in 2014, under the National Identity Management Commission, which introduced biometric registration and a more secure card design to enhance identity verification and combat fraud.
National anthem	Nigeria, We Hail Thee	Nigeria's national anthem, Nigeria, We Hail Thee	1960 (Re-adopted on 29 May 2024)	The national anthem "Nigeria, We Hail Thee" was originally adopted in 1960, the year Nigeria gained independence from British colonial rule. The anthem, composed by Lillian Jean Williams, was re-adopted on 29 May 2024, replacing the more recent "Arise, O Compatriots", which had been in use since 1978. This anthem is performed at official events, national holidays, and significant ceremonies.
National days	Independence Day	Nigeria Independence Medal Ribbon	1 October 1960	Independence Day is celebrated annually on 1 October, marking the day Nigeria gained independence from British colonial rule in 1960. The day is observed with various events, including parades, cultural displays, and speeches by political leaders.
National days	Democracy Day	Moshood Kasimawo Olawale	1999	Democracy Day is celebrated on 12 June to commemorate the restoration of democracy in Nigeria. Initially observed on 29 May to mark the transition from military to civilian rule in 1999, it was moved to 12 June 2018 to honour the annulled 1993 presidential election won by Moshood Kashimawo Olawale Abiola. Abiola's election was considered a landmark in Nigeria's democratic history, and he became a symbol of the struggle for democracy following his detention and death.
National days	Armed Forces Remembrance Day	Nigerian Armed Forces Flag	1970	Armed Forces Remembrance Day is observed on 15 January each year to honour the service and sacrifice of Nigeria's military personnel. This date marks the end of the Nigerian Civil War in 1970. The day is commemorated with wreath-laying ceremonies at military cemeteries and memorials. The event pays tribute to soldiers who died in various conflicts, including the Nigerian Civil War, peacekeeping missions, and other military operations. In addition to honouring fallen heroes, the day also acknowledges the contributions of living veterans and promotes support for their welfare. Military parades, religious services, and public speeches are also common on this day.
Oath of allegiance	National Pledge		1976	The Nigerian National Pledge was authored by Professor (Mrs.) Felicia Adebola Adeyoyin in 1976 and was introduced to instill a sense of patriotism and national pride among citizens. The pledge reads: "I pledge to Nigeria my country. To be faithful, loyal and honest. To serve Nigeria with all my strength. To defend her unity, and uphold her honor and glory. So help me God". The introduction of the pledge followed the creation of the Nigerian national anthem and is recited by students in schools and during official events to reinforce the values of loyalty, honesty, and dedication to the nation.
National currency	Nigerian Naira	Nigerian Naira	1 January 1973	The Nigerian Naira (ISO code: NGN, ₦) became the official currency of Nigeria on 1 January 1973, replacing the Nigerian pound. The currency is issued and regulated by the Central Bank of Nigeria, which was established in 1958. The introduction of the Naira was part of Nigeria's decimalisation process, aligning the currency system with international standards. The Naira is subdivided into 100 Kobo. Over the years, various denominations of banknotes and coins have been issued, with notable changes in design and security features to prevent counterfeiting. The Naira has faced significant devaluation and inflation issues, influenced by economic policies, global oil prices, and political factors. Efforts to stabilise the currency have included various monetary policies and foreign exchange controls by the Central Bank of Nigeria.
National bird	Eagle (Accipitridae)	Martial eagle (Polemaetus bellicosus), one of the eagle species native to Nigeria	—	The eagle is recognised as both the national bird and the national animal of Nigeria and is prominently featured on the Nigerian Coat of Arms. The eagle symbolises strength, pride, and dignity, and its depiction on the coat of arms is standing on a wreath, which is coloured in the national colours of green and white.
National animal	Eagle (Accipitridae)	Martial eagle (Polemaetus bellicosus), one of the eagle species native to Nigeria	—	The eagle is recognised as both the national bird and the national animal of Nigeria and is prominently featured on the Nigerian Coat of Arms. The eagle symbolises strength, pride, and dignity, and its depiction on the coat of arms is standing on a wreath, which is coloured in the national colours of green and white.
National flower	Yellow Trumpet (Costus spectabili)	Costus Spectabilis, Nigeria's national flower	—	The Costus spectabilis, also known as the Yellow Trumpet, is the national flower of Nigeria. This flower is native to tropical Africa and is found abundantly in Nigeria's forests and on its riverbanks. The flower is also featured on the Nigerian Coat of Arms.
