= List of Nigerian flags =

This is a list of flags used in Nigeria.

== National flag ==
Flag	Date	Use	Description
	1960–present	Flag of Nigeria	A vertical bicolour triband of green, white, and green.

== Governmental flags ==
Flag	Date	Use	Description
		State flag	A vertical bicolour triband of green, white, and green; charged with the coat of arms in the centre.
		Civil ensign	A red field with the national flag in the canton.
		State ensign	A blue field with the national flag in the canton.

== Presidential flags ==
Flag	Date	Use	Description
		Flag of the president of Nigeria	
		Flag of the president as commander-in-chief of the armed forces	

== Military flags ==
Flag	Date	Use	Description
		Flag of the Nigerian Defence Forces	
	1998–	Naval ensign	A white field with the national flag in the canton, with the Naval seal in the fly.
		Air force ensign	A sky-blue field with the national flag in the canton, with the air force roundel in the fly.
		Flag of the Nigerian Army	

== Subnational flags ==
Flag	State	Adopted	Description
	Abia		
	Akwa Ibom		
	Anambra		
	Bauchi		
	Bayelsa		
	Benue		
	Borno		
	Cross River		
	Delta		
	Ebonyi		
	Edo		
	Ekiti		
	Enugu		
	Gombe		
	Imo		
	Jigawa		
	Kaduna		
	Kano		
	Katsina		
	Kebbi		
	Kogi		
	Kwara		
	Lagos		
	Nasarawa		
	Niger		
	Ogun		
	Ondo		
	Osun		
	Oyo		
	Plateau		
	Rivers		
	Sokoto		
	Taraba		
	Yobe		
	Federal Capital Territory		

== Historical flags ==
Flag	Date	Use	Description
	700–1380	Flag of the Kanem Empire	A white field with a green palm tree in the center.
	1380–1893	Flag of the Bornu Empire	A brown field with a white crescent moon in the center.
	1640–1902	Flag of the Aro Confederacy	A black background with a sword and gun with a bird on top with the word "OMU" and "ARO-CHUKU" at the bottom of the flag. On the right and left are two crowns and in the middle two hands appearing to be trading something.
	1897	A flag which was captured by British forces from the Kingdom of Benin in 1897	A red background with a man with a sword cutting someone’s head off.
	1804–1903	Flag of the Sokoto Caliphate	
	1887–1888	Flag of the Royal Niger Company	
	1888–1899	Flag of the Royal Niger Company	
	1870–1888	Flag of the British West African Settlements	
	1888–1906	Flag of the Lagos Colony	
	1884–1893	Flag of the Oil Rivers Protectorate	
	1893–1899	Flag of the Niger Coast Protectorate	
	1900–1914	Flag of the Northern Nigeria Protectorate	
	1900–1914	Flag of the Southern Nigeria Protectorate	
	1914–1952	Flag of the Colony and Protectorate of Nigeria	British Blue Ensign with a red disc containing a green six-pointed star described as the Seal of Solomon, surrounding a Tudor Crown with the white word "Nigeria" under it.
	1952–1960	Flag of the Colony and Protectorate of Nigeria	British Blue Ensign with red disc containing a green six-pointed star described as the Seal of Solomon, surrounding a St. Edward's Crown with the white word "Nigeria" under it.
	1959	Akinkunmi's original proposal for the flag of independent Nigeria	
	1960–1998	Naval ensign	A white field with a red St. George's Cross, with the national flag in canton.
	1963	Former flag of the president	

== See also ==
- National symbols of Nigeria
