= Abuja City Gate =

Monument in Abuja, Nigeria

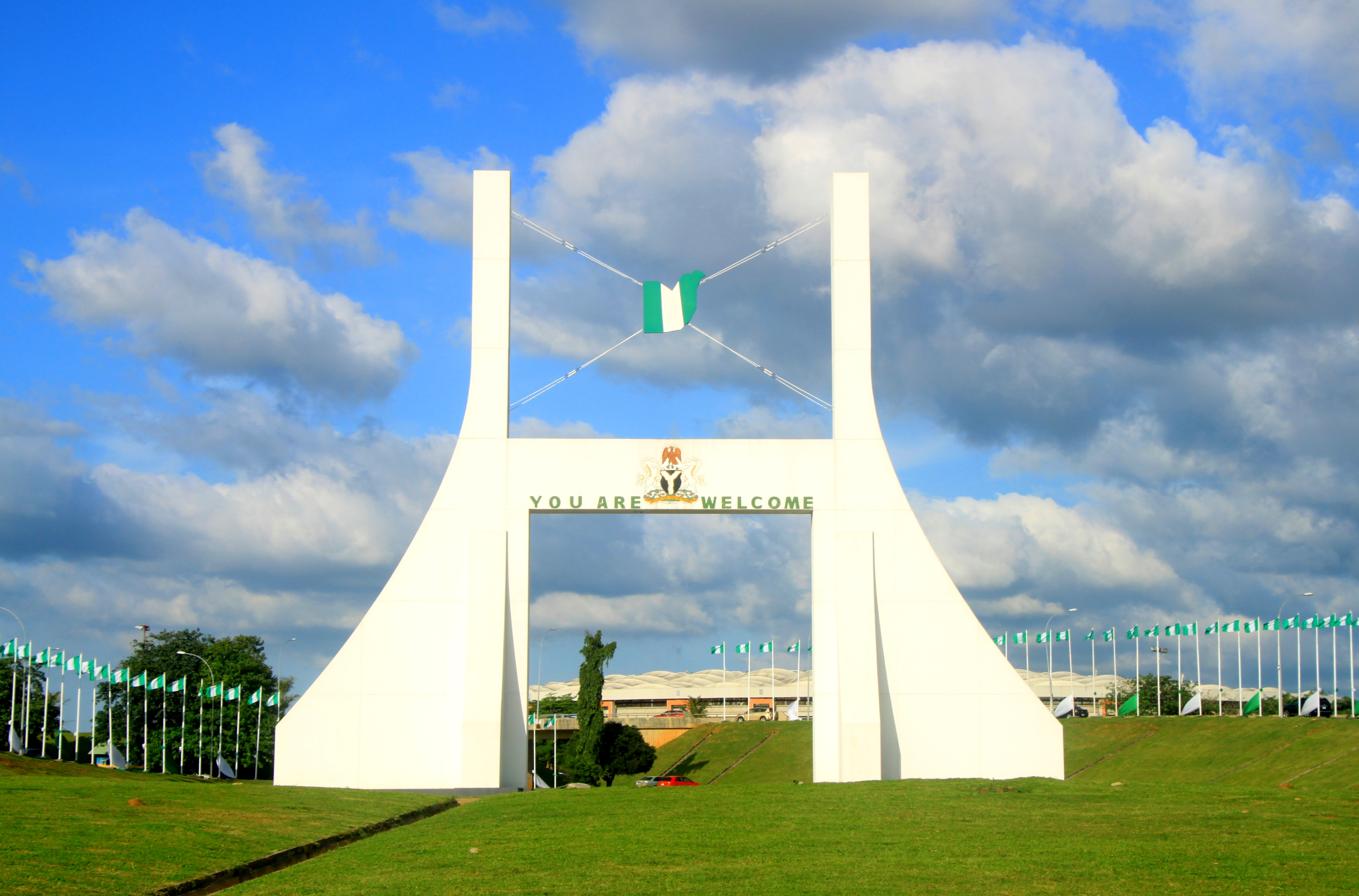
- Interactive map of Abuja City Gate
- Location: Kukwaba, Abuja, FCT, Nigeria
- Coordinates: 9°2′7.42″N 7°26′53.71″E
- Type: Monument
- Material: Concrete
- Height: approx. 25 m (27 yd; 82 ft)
- Dedicated to: Abuja

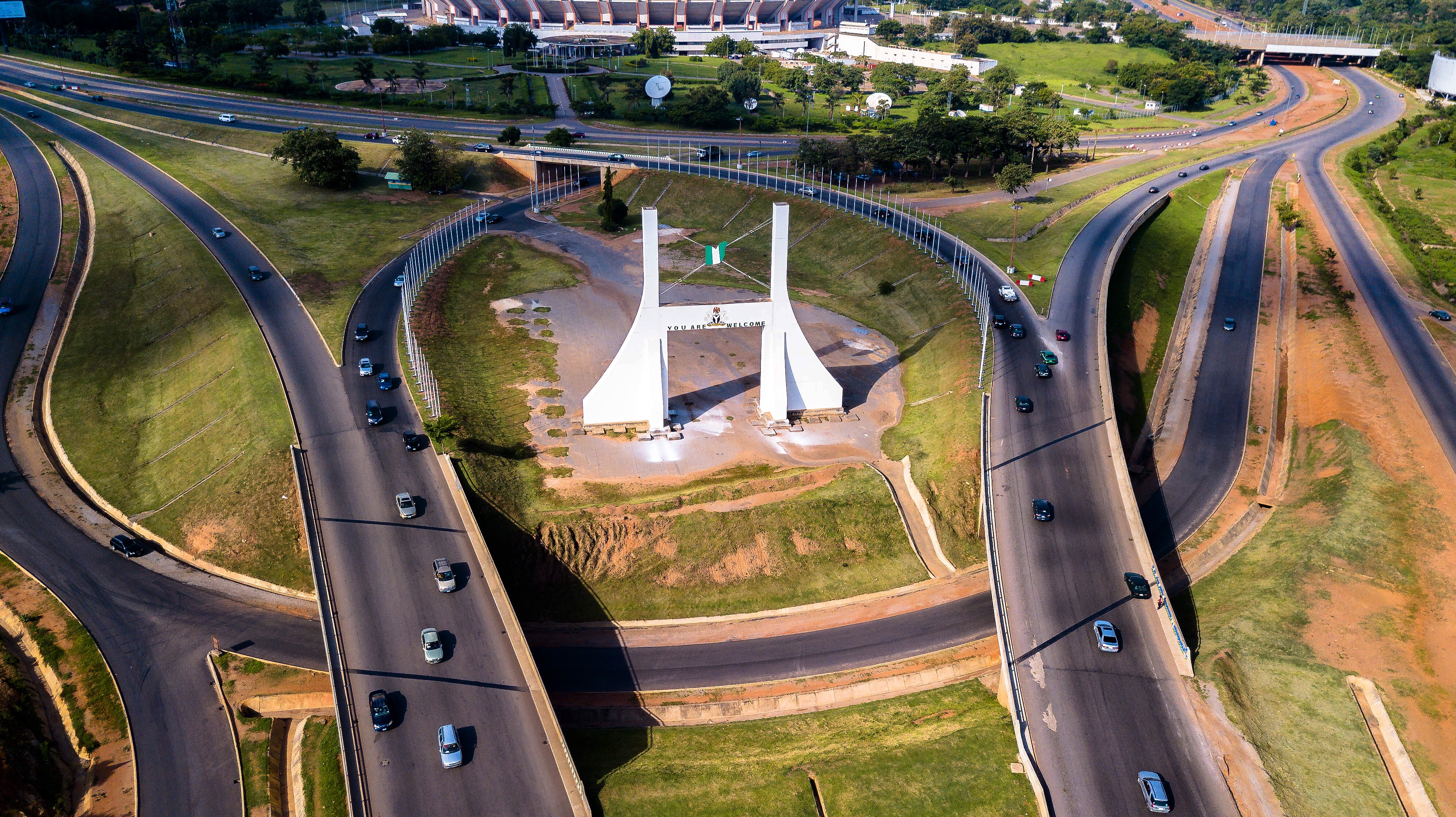
Abuja City Gate aerial view

The Abuja City Gate is a concrete monument and national landmark located in Abuja, the capital of Nigeria. The gate is topped with the Nigerian flag and the coat of arms. It was erected in 1991, during the movement of the national capital from Lagos to Abuja.

The monument is located on Airport Road from the international airport in the district of Kukwaba.

== History ==
The monument was built during the administration of Ibrahim Babangida to commemorate the movement of the national capital from Lagos to Abuja. It acts as a pavilion and a welcome sign to visitors coming into the city.

In March 2026, it was reported that the Abuja City Gate will be renovated to include a water fountain and a recreational area.

== Significance ==
The monument features three arches. Two large inverted columns with the Nigerian flag in between them, along with a smaller center arch bearing Nigeria's coat of arms of Nigeria. It marks the formal entrance into Abuja city proper.
