= Akinkunmi =

Akinkunmi is both a given name and a surname. Notable people with the name include:

- Akinkunmi Amoo (born 2002), Nigerian footballer
- Taiwo Akinkunmi (1936–2023), Nigerian civil servant
