= Akinwunmi =

- Gender: Male
- Language: Yoruba

Origin
- Origin: Nigeria
- Meaning: Bravery attracts me
- Region of origin: South western Nigeria

Akinwunmi // is a popular Nigerian male given name and surname of Yoruba origin. It means "bravery attracts me". An alternate spelling is "Akinwumi," common in Ekiti and Ondo State.

== Notable people ==
- Akinwunmi Ambode, governor of Lagos State
- Akinwunmi Isola, Nigerian playwright
- Akinwumi Adesina, president of the African Development Bank
- Obafemi Akinwunmi Martins, Nigerian footballer
- Taiwo akinkunmi, Nigerian civil servant
- Akinkunmi Amoo, Nigerian footballer
