= Pa Odiase =

Nigerian composer of the national anthem (1934–2013)

Pa Ben Odiase
- Born: Benedict Elide Odiase; 25 August 1934; Colonial Nigeria
- Died: 11 June 2013 (aged 78) Lagos State, Nigeria
- Occupations: Composer, Police Officer
- Years active: 1954–1992

Pa Benedict Odiase (August 25, 1934 – June 11, 2013) was a Nigerian composer who composed "Arise, O Compatriots," the former national anthem of Nigeria. "Arise, O Compatriots," which was adopted in 1978, replaced the country's previous (now reinstated) national anthem, "Nigeria, We Hail Thee".

Odiase was born in 1934, and raised in British Nigeria, where Edo State is now. He served in the Nigerian Police Force from 1954 to 1992 and was also the music director of the Nigeria Police Band and the MId-West State Police Band. He was awarded the Order of the Niger in December 2001.

Odiase died from a short illness on June 11, 2013, at the age of 78.
