= State flag =

Term referring to two types of flag

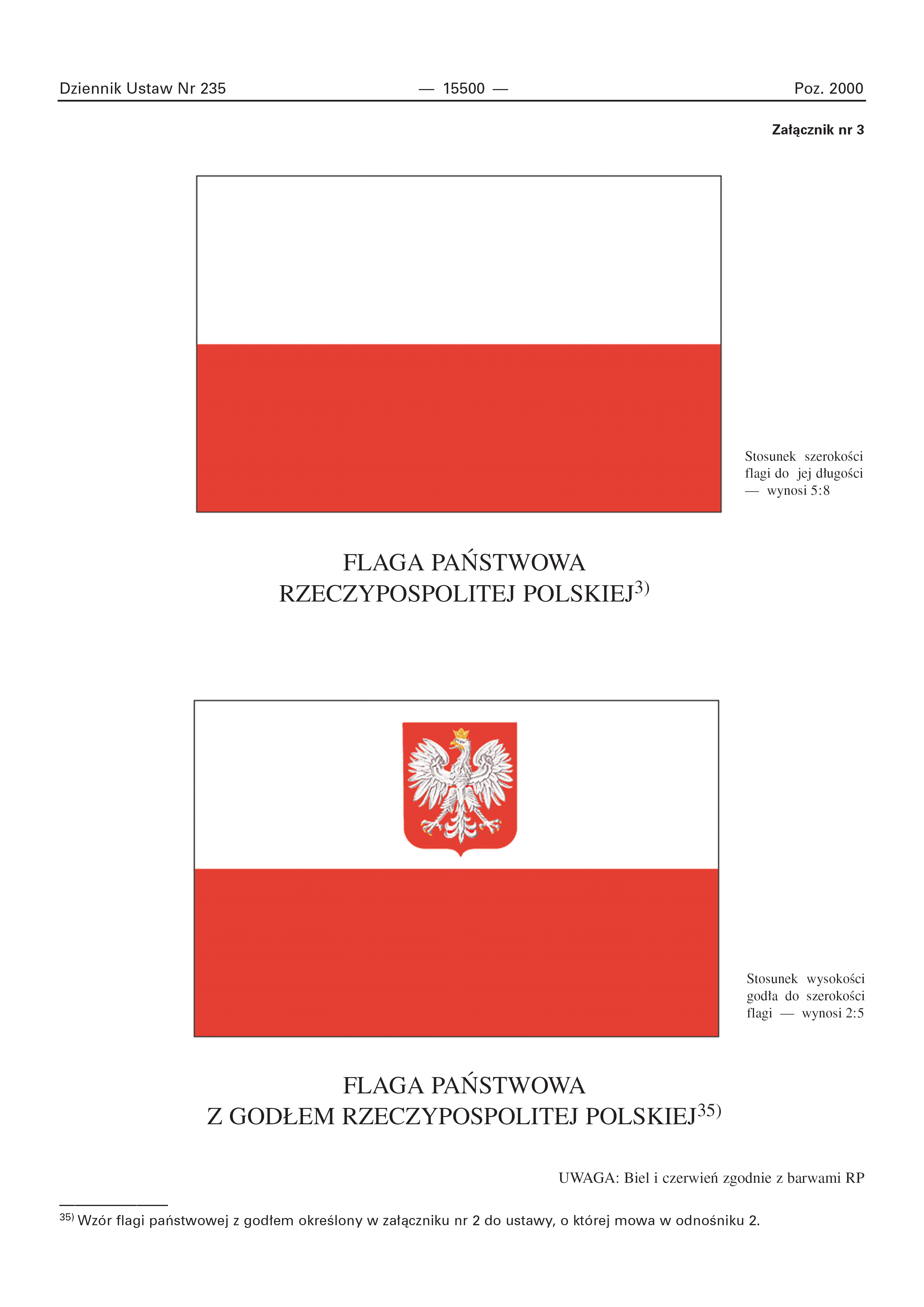
The flag of Poland, having the state flag variant being charged with the coat of arms. In some jurisdictions or on certain occasions, the state flags are designated to be flown exclusively by governmental authorities and services and restricted from use by civilian and non-governmental parties. Inversely, many states and governments only have a single national flag, or do not have separate civil and state banners.

In vexillology, a state flag is either the flag of the government of a sovereign state (and can also be referred as a government flag and likely interchangeable with a national flag in certain scenarios), or the flag of an individual federated state (subnational administrative division).

== Government flag ==
A state flag is a variant of a national flag (or occasionally a completely different design) specifically designated and restricted by law or custom (theoretically or actually) to use by a country's government or its agencies. For this reason, they are sometimes referred to as government flags. In many countries the state flag and the civil flag (as flown by the general public) are identical, but in other countries, notably those in Latin America, central Europe, and Scandinavia, the state flag is a more complex version of the national flag, often featuring the national coat of arms or some other emblem as part of the design. Scandinavian countries also use swallowtailed state flags, to further differentiate them from civil flags.

In addition, some countries have state ensigns, separate flags for use by non-military government ships such as guard vessels. For example, government ships in the United Kingdom fly the Blue Ensign.

State flags should not be confused with the national flag as used by military organizations; these are referred to as war flags and naval ensigns.

=== National flags with separate state and civil versions ===
Optional civil flag of Andorra
State and civil flag of Andorra
Optional civil flag of Argentina
State and civil flag of Argentina
Optional civil flag of Austria
State flag of Austria
De facto civil flag of Belgium (ratio 2:3)
Official state and civil flag of Belgium (ratio 13:15)
Civil flag of Bolivia
State flag of Bolivia
Civil flag of Costa Rica
State flag of Costa Rica
Civil flag of Denmark
State flag of Denmark
Civil flag of Dominican Republic
State flag of Dominican Republic
Civil flag of El Salvador
State flag of El Salvador
Alternative state flag of El Salvador
Civil flag of Finland
State flag of Finland
Civil and alternative state flag of Germany
State flag of Germany
Unofficial flag of Germany
Civil flag of Guatemala
State flag of Guatemala
Civil flag of Haiti
State flag of Haiti
State and civil flag of Hungary (ratio 1:2)
Alternative civil flag of Hungary (ratio 2:3)
Optional state flag of Hungary
Civil flag of Iceland
State flag of Iceland
Civil flag of Italy
State flag of Italy (maritime only)
Civil flag of Liechtenstein
State flag of Liechtenstein
State and civil flag of Lithuania
Historical state flag of Lithuania
Civil flag of Monaco
State flag of Monaco
Civil and state flag of Nicaragua
Alternative state flag of Nicaragua
Civil flag of Nigeria
State flag of Nigeria
Civil flag of Norway
State flag of Norway
Civil flag of Palestine
State flag of Palestine
Civil flag of Peru
State flag of Peru
Civil flag of Poland
State flag of Poland
Civil flag of Romania
Unofficial state flag of Romania
Civil flag of San Marino
State flag of San Marino
Civil flag of Serbia
State flag of Serbia
Optional civil flag of Spain
State and civil flag of Spain
Optional civil flag of Transnistria (reverse)
State and civil flag of Transnistria
State and civil flag of Tuvalu
Alternative state flag of Tuvalu
Civil and state flag of Uruguay
Alternative state flag of Uruguay (Artigas flag)
Alternative state flag of Uruguay (Flag of the Treinta y Tres)
Civil flag of Venezuela
State flag of Venezuela

== Flag of a federated state (subnational entity) ==
U.S. Navy sailors holding various U.S. state flags

In Argentina, Australia, Brazil, India, the United States, and some other federalized countries, the term state flag can have a different usage, as it frequently refers to an official flag of any of the individual states or territorial subdivisions that make up the nation.

To avoid confusion with the first meaning of the term, however, such a flag would be more precisely referred to as "the flag of the state of X", rather than "the state flag of X". For this usage, see also:

- Flags of the Argentine provinces
- Flags of the Australian states
- Flags of the Austrian states
- Flags of the Brazilian states
- Flags of the Canadian provinces and territories
- Flags of the German states
- Flags of the Indian states
- Flags of the Malaysian states
- Flags of the Mexican states
- Flags of the Nigerian states
- Flags of Pakistani provinces and territories
- Flags of the U.S. states and territories
