= Nigeria, We Hail Thee =

National anthem of Nigeria

- National anthem of Nigeria
- Lyrics: Lillian Jean Williams, 1959
- Music: Frances Benda, 1959
- Adopted: 1 October 1960
- Readopted: 29 May 2024
- Relinquished: 1 October 1978
- Preceded by: "Arise, O Compatriots"

Audio sample
- "Nigeria, We Hail Thee" (instrumental): file; help

"Nigeria, We Hail Thee" is the national anthem of Nigeria. Dating to 1959, the lyrics were written by Lillian Jean Williams and the music was composed by Frances Benda. It was first used upon independence in 1960. The anthem was said to be frowned upon by the military regime until it was replaced by "Arise, O Compatriots" in 1978. "Nigeria, We Hail Thee" was officially readopted on 29 May 2024 after a bill to that effect was passed by the National Assembly and was signed by the President.

== History ==
"Nigeria, We Hail Thee" was adopted as Nigeria's national anthem on 1 October 1960.

A competition was held to select the music and lyrics of the anthem. The winning lyrics were written by Lillian Jean Williams, a British expatriate who lived in Nigeria when it achieved independence. Williams worked for the Federal Ministry of Labour and Welfare and donated her prize money to the Nigerian Red Cross.

Frances Benda composed the music for "Nigeria, We Hail Thee." In 2024, Tolu Ogunlesi identified that Benda was a pen name for Mrs Charles Kernot, a private music teacher and professional pianist at the Carol Hill School of Classical Ballet in London. Her composition was chosen by judges including Professor Fela Sowande, O. Omideyi, Thomas King Ekundayo Phillips, Wilberforce Echezona, M.C. Majekodunmi and H Lawson.

The song was used as the national anthem until it was replaced by "Arise, O Compatriots" in 1978.

On 23 May 2024, the National Assembly passed a bill to relinquish "Arise, O Compatriots" and readopt "Nigeria, We Hail Thee". The bill was signed into law by President Bola Tinubu on 29 May 2024. Mohammed Tahir Monguno, chair of the parliamentary committee that led the anthem's readoption, said that the change was "apt, timely and important", while Tinubu said the anthem symbolised Nigeria's diversity.

== Lyrics ==
English original

I
Nigeria, we hail thee,
Our own dear native land,
Though tribes and tongues may differ,
In brotherhood we stand
Nigerians all, are proud to serve
Our sovereign Motherland.

II
Our flag shall be a symbol
That truth and justice reign,
In peace or battle honoured,
And this we count as gain,
To hand on to our children
A banner without stain.

III
O God of all creation,
Grant this our one request:
Help us to build a nation
Where no man is oppressed,
And so with peace and plenty
Nigeria may be blessed.

Yoruba translation

I
Nàìjíríà a kí ọ,
Ilẹ̀ ìbí wa ọ̀wọ́n,
Ẹyà àti èdè le yàtọ̀,
A dúró ní 'ṣọ̀kan,
Gbogbo wa la ó fayọ̀ sin,
Ilẹ̀ 'bí wa ọ̀wọ́n.

II
Àsìá wa yóò j'ámì,
Pé òtító àti ìse dédé ló ń jọba
Nígbà àlàáfíà,
Tàbi ogun, èyí yóò j'ẹ́rè wa,
Láti fi lé ọmọ lọ́wọ́,
Àsìá 'làìlábàwọ́n.

III
Ọlọ́run gbogbo ẹ̀dá,
Gbọ́ àdúrà wa yìí,
Jẹ̀ ká ní orílẹ̀-èdè,
Níbi ìrẹ́jẹ kòsí,
K'àlàfíà àti ọ̀pọ̀,
Jẹ́' 'bùkún Nàìjíríà.

Igbo translation

I
Nigeria, anyi ekene gi,
Ala nna anyị nke ọma,
Ọ bụ ezie na ebo na asụsụ
nwere ike ịdị iche.
Na òtù ụmụnna anyị na-eguzo
Ndi Naijiria nile, Obi dị anyị ụtọ
ijere ala nna anyị ozi.

II
Ọkọlọtọ anyị ga-abụ akara
Na eziokwu na ikpe ziri ezi na-achị,
N'udo ma ọ bụ agha a na-asọpụrụ,
Na nke a anyị na-agụ dị ka uru,
Iji nyefee ụmụ anyị
Ọkọlọtọ na-enweghị ntụpọ.

III
Chineke nke ihe nile,
Nye nke a otu arịrịọ anyị:
Nyere anyi aka wuo mba
Ebe a na-emegbu mmadụ,
Ya mere, udo na ụbara
Nigeria nwere ike gọzie.

Hausa translation

I
Najeriya muna jinjina muku
Namu masoyi ƙasar haihuwa
Ko da yake kabilanci da harshe na iya bambanta
A cikin 'yan uwantaka mun tsaya
'Yan Najeriya duka, suna alfahari da yin hidima.
Mahaifiyar mu mai martaba.

II
Tutar mu za ta zama alama
Wannan gaskiya da adalci suna mulki
A cikin aminci ko yaƙi girmama',
Kuma wannan muna ƙidaya a matsayin riba,
Don mika wa yaranmu
Tuta ba tare da tabo ba.

III
Ya Allah dukkan halitta
Ka ba da wannan buƙatunmu ɗaya.
A taimake mu mu gina kasa
Inda ba a zaluntar mutum ba
Haka kuma da zaman lafiya da yalwa
Najeriya na iya samun albarka.

Fulfulde translation

I
Naajeeriya, min koomni maa,
Lesdi amin ndi min ɓuri yiɗki,
Fuu e leƴƴi e ɗemɗe peerootirii,
En go'o ngam en dewerɗiraaɓe,
Naajeeriyankoo'en fuu, e ñayra jagganaaki
Lesdi inna amin ndimri.

II
Ililawal amin woni alaama
Dow goonga e adilaaku doggintee,
Nder joonde jam malla e haɓre teddinteengal,
Ɗu'um min limtay nder keɓndam,
Ɗam min ndontinta ɓiɓɓe amin
Ililawal ngal walaa tuundi.

III
Yaa Joomu tagefuuji,
Jaabana min tornde amin wootere,
Wallu min mahuki lesdi
To walaa kala tooñeteeɗo,
E njamu e maral ɗuuɗngal
Naajeeriya barkiɗine.

Nigerian pledge of allegiance is recited immediately after the playing of the Nigerian national anthem. It was written by Felicia Adebola Adeyoyin in 1976.

English original

I pledge to Nigeria, my country
To be faithful, loyal and honest
To serve Nigeria with all my strength
To defend her unity and uphold her honour and glory
So help me, God.

Hausa translation

Na yi wa Najeriya ƙasata alƙawarin
Zan zama mai imani, mai biyayya da gaskiya
Zan yiwa Najeriya hidima da dukkan ƙarfina
Don kare hadin kanta da kuma kare mutuncinta da daukakarta
Ya Allah ka taimake ni.

Yoruba translation

Mo ṣeleri fun Nàìjíríà orilẹ-ede mi
Lati jẹ ol loyaltọ aduroṣinṣin ati otitọ
Lati fi gbogbo ipa sin Nigeria
Lati daabobo isokan rẹ
Ki o si gbe iyi ati ogo rẹ ga
Nitorina ran mi lọwọ Ọlọrun.

Tyap translation

N da̱p a̱nu ma̱ng Naijeriya, a̱byin nung ka.
N nyia̱ a̱cucuk, n nwuak a̱pyia̱ nung, n nyia̱ tsotswat.
N nyia̱ Naijeriya ta̱m ma̱ng a̱lyia̱ a̱nyiung.
N cok mun a̱pyia̱ nji hu.
A̱wot, n di̱n a̱ma shi nji hu ma̱ng yet nji hu,
Mat a̱nia, A̱gwaza beang nung.

== Criticism ==
When "Nigeria, We Hail Thee" was first adopted in 1960, the new national anthem faced criticism for a number of reasons. The Daily Service, a newspaper run by the Yoruba organisation Egbé Ọmọ Odùduwà, started a campaign against the national anthem, which led to a committee being established to collect signatures as a petition.

The anthem has been regarded as controversial, due to its association with the colonial government.

Following its readoption in 2024, the song was again criticised for the lack of consultation in passing the law designating it as the national anthem and for what was perceived to be misplaced priorities by the administration of President Bola Tinubu. Former education minister Oby Ezekwesili criticised the anthem's suitability, given the presence of "pejorative" words like "native land" and "tribes", and that she would continue to sing "Arise, O Compatriots" as the national anthem. A video of political activist Aisha Yesufu circulated online where she refused to recite "Nigeria, We Hail Thee" as the new national anthem.
