= Babatunde Ogunnaike =

American chemical engineer (1956–2022)

Babatunde Ayodeji Ogunnaike
- Born: March 26, 1956; Ijebu Igbo, Ogun State, Nigeria
- Died: February 20, 2022 (aged 65); Hockessin, Delaware, U.S.
- Education: University of Lagos (B Sc.), University of Wisconsin Madison (MSc., Ph.D.)
- Occupation: Engineer
- Scientific career
- Fields: Chemical engineering
- Workplaces: University of Lagos, University of Delaware
- Website: Faculty profile

Babatunde Ayodeji Ogunnaike (March 26, 1956 – February 20, 2022) was an American chemical engineer of Nigerian descent and the William L. Friend Professor of Chemical and Biomolecular Engineering at the University of Delaware (UD). He was the former dean of UD's college of engineering. He died on February 20, 2022. He had waged a long battle with cancer.

== Early life ==
Ogunnaike was born on March 26, 1956, in Ijebu Igbo, Ogun State, Nigeria.

== Education and career ==
Ogunnaike attended the University of Lagos for his bachelor's degree, graduating with First Class Honours in chemical engineering in 1976.

Shortly after completing his undergraduate degree, Ogunnaike submitted lyrics for a competition to create a new national anthem for Nigeria. His entry was combined with those of four others to form the current national anthem of Nigeria in 1978.

He furthered his studies and earned an M.Sc. degree in statistics from the University of Wisconsin-Madison and a PhD in chemical engineering also from the same university in 1981.

He commenced academic work as a lecturer at the department of chemical engineering, University of Lagos, in 1982 and became senior lecturer and successively, associate professor of chemical engineering. He continued lecturing at the University of Lagos until 1988.

Ogunnaike was a research engineer with the process control group of the Shell Development Corporation in Houston, Texas from 1981 to 1982. He worked as a researcher for DuPont and was also a consultant to several companies including Gore, PPG Industries, and Corning Inc.

He joined the faculty of the University of Delaware in 2002 and was appointed to the William L. Friend Professorship of Chemical Engineering in 2008. His title became the William L. Friend Professor of Chemical and Biomolecular Engineering when the name of the department was changed in January 2012. He led the Ogunnaike Research Group. He has also been a visiting professor at the University of Wisconsin-Madison and the African University of Science and Technology, Abuja.

Ogunnaike acted as interim dean of the college of engineering at the University of Delaware beginning in July 2011, and was named dean of the College of Engineering effective July 1, 2013. He retired as dean on October 1, 2018, but remained on the faculty. He played a key role in creating a new report that would guide the future of chemical engineering, jointly put together by the national academies of sciences, engineering, and medicine.

== Research ==
Ogunnaike is the author and editor of several books, including Random phenomena : fundamentals of probability and statistics for engineers (2009) and Process dynamics, modeling and control (1994). His books, papers and book chapters are used to educate engineers in instrumentation, systems and control at many universities. He was associate editor of the Institute of Electrical and Electronics Engineers’ IEEE Transactions on Control Systems Technology and the American Chemical Society’s Industrial & Engineering Chemistry.

His research focuses on modeling and control of industrial processes; the application of process analytical technology for control of pharmaceutical processes; identification and control of nonlinear systems; the interaction of process design and process operability; applied statistics; biological control systems; and systems biology with application to neuronal responses and cancer.

== Selected publications ==
- Radhakrishnan, D.; Robinson, A.S.; Ogunnaike, B.A. (2018) Controlling the Glycosylation Profile in mAbs Using Time-Dependent Media Supplementation. Antibodies, 7, 1.
- Birtwistle, M.R., Rauch, J., Kiyatkin, A. et al. (2012). Emergence of bimodal cell population responses from the interplay between analog single-cell signaling and protein expression noise. BMC Syst Biol 6, 109.
- Ogunnaike, Babatunde A. (2009). Random phenomena : fundamentals of probability and statistics for engineers. Boca Raton, FL: CRC Press. ISBN 978-14200-449-73.
- Doyle, F. J.; Pearson, R. K.; Ogunnaike, B. A. (2002). Identification and control using Volterra models. London: Springer. ISBN 978-1852-331-498.
- Ogunnaike, Babatunde A.; Ray, W. Harmon (1994). Process dynamics, modeling and control. New York [u.a.]: Oxford University Press. ISBN 978-0-19-509119-9.

== Patents ==
- US Patent on Predictive Regulatory Controller.

== Honors and fellowships ==
- 2021 Medal of Distinction: University of Delaware, December 7, 2021 (UD's highest non-academic award)
- 2019 David Ollis Lecture: North Carolina State University, December 2, 2019
- 2019 Johannsen-Crosby Lectures: Michigan State University, September 12, 2019
- 2019 Inaugural Costel D. Denson Lecture: Lehigh University, March 20, 2019
- 2018 Warren K. Lewis Award, American Institute of Chemical Engineers
- 2018 Roger Sargent Lecture: Imperial College, London, December 6, 2018
- 2018 Sheldon Weinbaum Distinguished Lecture: Rensselaer Polytechnic Institute, October 11, 2018
- 2017 Fellow, International Federation of Automatic Control (IFAC)
- 2017 Honorary Professor, East China University of Science and Technology, Shanghai, China
- 2017 Ralph Peck Lecture, Illinois Institute of Technology, Chicago, April 14, 2017
- 2017 Richard S. H. Mah Lecture, Northwestern University, September 20, 2017
- 2016 Fellow, American Association for the Advancement of Science (AAAS)
- 2014 Fellow of the National Academy of Inventors
- 2012 Fellow of the Nigerian Academy of Engineering
- 2012 Fellow of the American National Academy of Engineering
- 2009 Fellow of American Institute of Chemical Engineers
- 2008 AACC Control Engineering Practice award
- 2007 ISA Eckman Award
- 2004 University of Delaware's College of Engineering Excellence in Teaching award
- 1998 American Institute of Chemical Engineers CAST Computing Practice Award
- Member of the American Statistical Association
- Member of the American Association for the Advancement of Science

== Death ==
Ogunnaike died at the age of 65 on February 20, 2022.
