= Nigeria Police Band =

The Nigeria Police Band is the official police band of Nigeria Police Force. It is the main musical support unit of the NPF, serving as the headquarters band based in Abuja. It is also considered to be the pioneer military marching band in Nigeria.

== History ==
It was founded in 1892 as a drum and bugle band in Colonial Nigeria. Their standard unifotm at the time included gray shirts, blue shorts, blue vests, black belts, and fez caps, with the omission of shoes. It became a full fledged military band in 1922 under a British bandsman by the name Lovell. From 1938, the band gradually rose to their present strength of 72 bandsmen of various ranks. A little bit after Nigeria’s Independence, the band paid tribute to this event their first long-playing record entitled Freedom Fanfare. The Police Band diplomacy played in the Zaire and Togo between 1961 and 1965. In 1968, Benedict P. Odiase became the first indigenous director. In 1976, Odiase was assigned to the Angolan Government to study ways and means of how the band could give technical assistance to Angola in the area of music. The band under Odiase composed the music to Arise, O Compatriots, which was used as the national anthem of Nigeria from 1 October 1978 until 2024.

== Directors of music ==
- Major I Boyle
- J. E. Boyle (May 1961-1968)
- Benedict P. Odiase (1968-1992)
