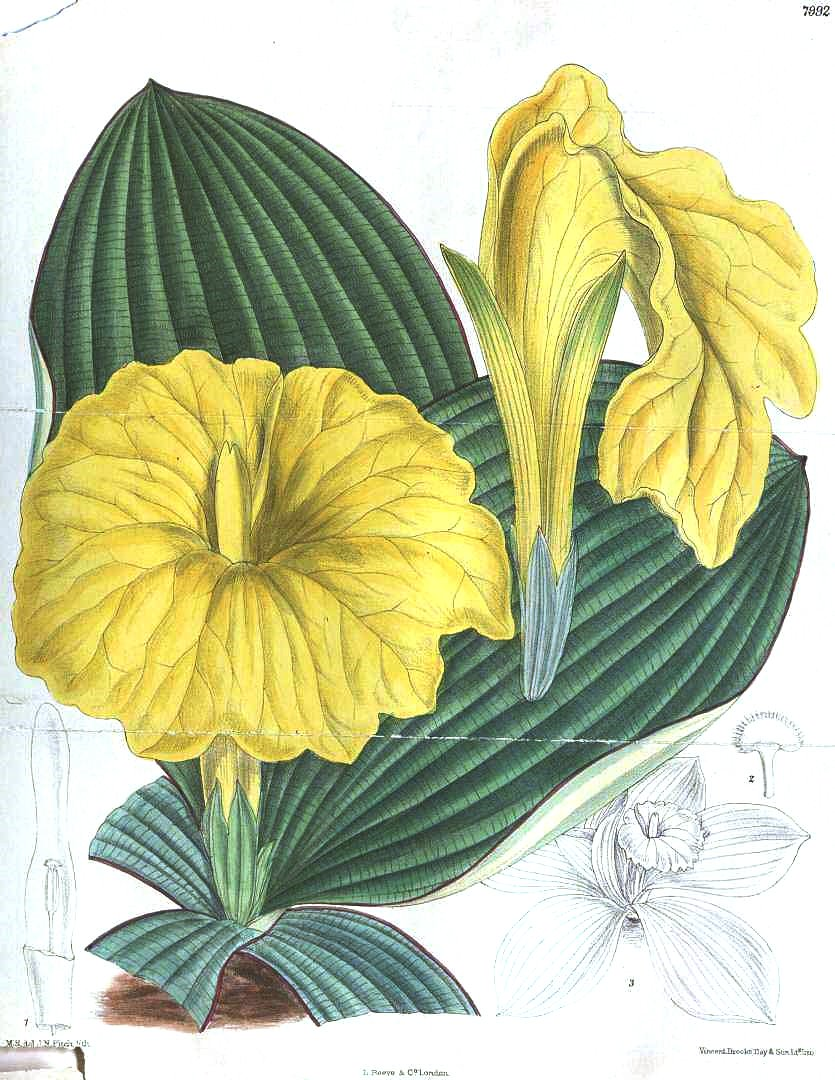
- Plate by Matilda Smith (1854–1926); Curtis’s Botanical Magazine

Scientific classification
- Kingdom: Plantae
- Clade: Embryophytes
- Clade: Tracheophytes
- Clade: Angiosperms
- Clade: Monocots
- Clade: Commelinids
- Order: Zingiberales
- Family: Costaceae
- Genus: Costus
- Species: C. spectabilis

Binomial name
- Costus spectabilis (Fenzl) Schumann

Synonyms
- Cadalvena dalzielii C.H.Wright; Cadalvena pistiifolia (K.Schum.) Baker; Cadalvena spectabilis Fenzl; Costus pistiifolius K.Schum.; Kaempferia spectabilis (Fenzl) Baker; Kaempferia spectabilis Bentham & Hooker

= Costus spectabilis =

Yellow trumpet

Species of flowering plant

Costus spectabilis, commonly known as the yellow trumpet, or yellow bell, is an African species of herb; low and perennial, it is found from Sierra Leone to Sudan to as far south as Angola and Zimbabwe.

== Species habit and description ==
It produces four large (12 x 12 cm), fleshy leaves which lie flat on the ground and form a basal rosette. They are glabrous above and pubescent below, especially along the midrib. The leaf margin is entire, often with an edging of purple-pink. The inflorescence is terminal, growing from the center of the rosette. The flowers are showy, yellow, and open singly and die rapidly, but are immediately followed by another. The species becomes dormant during winter, shrinking to a centipede-like rhizome without roots. In spring it produces paddle-shaped leaves that appress to the soil when fully formed, similar to water-lily pads. The abaxial leaf surface has a spongy white texture. Flowers are bright yellow with a crisped margin, and some 9 cm across, with a large staminodial labellum, and resembling those of a pumpkin. The texture of the flower is soft and thin.

== Familial traits ==
It is one of some 109 species belonging to the family of Costaceae, which is closely related to the ginger family Zingiberaceae. All are tropical and occur in Asia, Africa, Australia and the Americas. Their underground storage organs are rhizomes, and they are largely shade-loving, with some species able to grow in full sunlight. They prefer moist soil and a humid climate. The rhizomes, which are covered in brown papery scales which are hairy in their lower half, lengthen, spreading below ground level to form new offshoots. In cultivation in pots, the rhizomes will grow through drainage holes or follow the inside contours of the pot.

== Range and habitat ==
This geophyte is found over much of tropical Africa in Angola, Benin, Burkina Faso, Burundi, Cameroon, Chad, Côte d'Ivoire, Democratic Republic of the Congo, Ethiopia, Gabon, Ghana, Guinea, Kenya, Malawi, Mali, Nigeria, Senegal, Sierra Leone, Sudan, Tanzania, Togo, Uganda, Zambia and Zimbabwe. It is found in wooded grassland and deciduous woodland, occasionally near termite mounds or around rocks.

== Symbolism ==
Claire Waight Keller included the plant to represent Nigeria in Meghan Markle's wedding veil, which included the distinctive flora of each Commonwealth country.

Costus spectabilis is the national flower of Nigeria and can be seen on the country's Coat of Arms.
