= Arise, O Compatriots =

National anthem of Nigeria from 1978 to 2024

- Former national anthem of Nigeria
- Lyrics: John A. Ilechukwu, Eme Etim Akpan, B. A. Ogunnaike, Sota Omoigui and P. O. Aderibigbe, 1978
- Music: Nigerian Police Band under the directorship of B. E. Odiasse, 1990
- Adopted: 1 October 1978; 47 years ago
- Relinquished: 29 May 2024
- Succeeded by: Nigeria, We Hail Thee

Audio sample
- Arise, O Compatriots: file; help

"Arise, O Compatriots" is a Nigerian patriotic song that was used as the national anthem of Nigeria from 1 October 1978 until 2024, when "Nigeria, We Hail Thee" was reinstated. On 29 May 2024, "Arise, O Compatriots" was officially relinquished followed by the readoption of the first national anthem, "Nigeria, We Hail Thee" used from 1960 until 1978.

== History ==
The anthem was adopted in 1978 by the military dictatorship and replaced the previous national anthem, "Nigeria, We Hail Thee".

The lyrics are a combination of words and phrases taken from five of the best entries in a national contest. The words were put to music by the Nigeria Police Band under the directorship of Benedict P. Odiase (1934–2013). The lyrics were created by five people: P. O. Aderibigbe, John A. Ilechukwu, Dr. Sota Omoigui, Eme Etim Akpan and B.A. Ogunnaike.

On 29 May 2024, "Arise, O Compatriots" was officially relinquished following a bill passed by the National Assembly and subsequently signed into law by president Bola Tinubu. It was replaced by "Nigeria, We Hail Thee", Nigeria’s first national anthem.

== Lyrics ==
Although the anthem has two verses, usually only the first is sung. On some occasions, the second verse is recited as "The National Prayer".

English original

I
Arise, O Compatriots
Nigeria's call obey
To serve our fatherland
With love and strength and faith
The labour of our heroes past,
shall never be in vain
To serve with heart and might,
One nation bound in freedom, peace and unity.

II
Oh God of creation,
Direct our noble cause
Guide thou our leaders right
Help our youth the truth to know
In love and honesty to grow
And living just and true
Great lofty heights attain
To build a nation where peace and justice shall reign.

Hausa translation

I
Tashi, Ya Yan Uwa
Kiran Najeriya yayi biyayya
Don yi wa ƙasar mahaifinmu hidima
Da soyayya da karfi da imani
Aikin jaruman mu na baya,
ba zai taba zama banza ba
Don yin hidima da zuciya da ƙarfi,
Al'umma ɗaya daure cikin 'yanci, zaman lafiya da haɗin kai.

II
Ya Allah na halitta,
Ka shiryar da lamirinmu mai daraja
Ka shiryar da shugabannin mu daidai
Taimaka wa matasan mu gaskiya su sani
Cikin soyayya da gaskiya su girma
Kuma rayuwa mai adalci da gaskiya
Babban matsayi mai girma ya kai
Don gina ƙasa inda zaman lafiya da adalci za su yi sarauta.

Igbo translation

I
Bilie, ndị obodo
Oku Naìjíríyà rube isi
Ijere ala nna anyị ozi
Site n'ịhụnanya na ume na okwukwe
Ọrụ ndị dike anyị gara aga,
agaghị abụ n'efu
Iji obi na ike jee ozi,
Otu mba ejikọtara na nnwere onwe, udo na ịdị n'otu.

II
Chineke nke okike,
Duzie ebumnuche anyị dị mma
Na -eduzi ndị ndu anyị nke ọma
Nyere ndị ntorobịa anyị aka ịmata eziokwu
N'ịhụnanya na ịkwụwa aka ọtọ ka o too
Na ibi ndụ ziri ezi na eziokwu
Enweta oke oke oke
Iji wuo obodo ebe udo na ikpe ziri ezi ga -achị.

Yoruba translation

I
Dide, eyin ara
Wa je pe Naijiria
Lati sin ile baba wa
Pẹlu ifẹ ati agbara ati igbagbọ
Iṣẹ awọn akọni wa ti kọja,
kò gbodò ja si ásán
Lati sin pẹlu ọkan ati agbara,
Orilẹ -ede kan ti a dè ni ominira, alaafia ati iṣọkan

II
Oluwa Ọlọrun ẹda,
Ṣe itọsọna idi ọlọla wa
Ṣe itọsọna awọn oludari wa ni ẹtọ
Ran awọn ọdọ wa lọwọ otitọ lati mọ
Ni ifẹ ati otitọ lati dagba
Ati gbigbe laaye ati otitọ
Awọn ibi giga giga giga de ọdọ
Lati kọ orilẹ -ede kan nibiti alaafia ati ododo yoo jọba.

Fulani translation

I
Heey, ummee onon leydiyanke'en,
nootee noddaandu Naajeeriya.
Ngam jagganooɗen leydi baaba,
nder yiɗde, tiɗɗinaare e nuɗɗinaare.
Njaggu ngenndiyanke men ɓeɗiiɓe
to ngu laato ngu meere.
Njaggenen leydi nder ɓernde wootere,
leydi ngootiri ndarindiiri ndimaaku, jam e dental.

II
Yaa Joomiimin mo tagaale.
Ɓoocin ɗatal amin moƴƴungal
Hanndutu ardiiɓe amin no haani
Wallutu faamfaamɓe amin paama goonga
Ɓe mawnira yiɗde e goonga
Boo ɓe ngeeɗira adilaaku e goonga
Ɓe njottoyoo gikkuuji moƴƴuɗi
Ngam mahuki lesdi ndi
jam e adilaaku dogginirtee.

Tyap translation

I
Á̱na̱nyiuk, nyi ta̱ngam,
Fa̱k yei Naijeriya hu.
Zi̱ nyia̱ a̱byin ka nta̱m
Ma̱ng a̱lyia̱ nzi̱t a̱nyiung.
Nta̱m a̱yaagwak nzi̱t na gbangbang,
Zi̱ na kai nna ghwon bah.
Zi̱ na ba̱ng nna mi̱cet,
Zi̱ swan ma̠ a̠byin ka ma̱ sa̱t, zi̱ mun a̱pyia̱ nzi̱t.

II
A̱gwaza Tswazwa wu,
Da̱ kwak nzi̱t a̱son ka.
Tyiet a̱ca̱cet nzi̱t ba,
Ba̱ cat a̱ghyang ba̱t kuzang jen,
Ba̱ swan swat nyinyang hu.
A̱wot, ba̱ nyia̱ kyang tswa,
Á̱ nok a̱byin nang konyan
Nswan ma̱ng sa̱t a̱ni.

== National Pledge ==
The Nigerian pledge of allegiance is recited immediately after the playing of the Nigerian national anthem. It was written by Felicia Adebola Adeyoyin in 1976.

English original

I pledge to Nigeria, my country
To be faithful, loyal and honest
To serve Nigeria with all my strength
To defend her unity and uphold her honour and glory
So help me, God.

Hausa translation

Na yi wa Najeriya alƙawarin ƙasata
Don zama mai aminci, mai aminci da gaskiya
Don yiwa Najeriya hidima da dukkan ƙarfina
Don kare hadin kan ta da kuma kare mutuncin ta da daukakar ta
Don haka ku taimake ni Allah.

Yoruba translation

Mo ṣeleri fun Nàìjíríà orilẹ-ede mi
Lati jẹ ol loyaltọ aduroṣinṣin ati otitọ
Lati fi gbogbo ipa sin Nàìjíríà
Lati daabobo isokan rẹ
Ki o si gbe iyi ati ogo rẹ ga
Nitorina ran mi lọwọ Ọlọrun.

Tyap translation

N da̱p a̱nu ma̱ng Naijeriya, a̱byin nung ka.
N nyia̱ a̱cucuk, n nwuak a̱pyia̱ nung, n nyia̱ tsotswat.
N nyia̱ Naijeriya ta̱m ma̱ng a̱lyia̱ a̱nyiung.
N cok mun a̱pyia̱ nji hu.
A̱wot, n di̱n a̱ma shi nji hu ma̱ng yet nji hu,
Mat a̱nia, A̱gwaza beang nung.
