= Felicia Adeyoyin =

Nigerian professor and author of the National Pledge (1938–2021)

- Born: 6 November 1938
- Died: 1 May 2021 (aged 82)
- Occupation: Academic
- Known for: Author of the Nigerian national pledge
- Awards: Order of the Niger

Academic background
- Education: Birkbeck University; University of Lagos
- Thesis: The Dynamics of Teaching Social Studies at the Grade Two Teachers' College Level in Lagos State (1977)
- Doctoral advisor: J. U. Aisiku; A. I. Asiwaju

Felicia Adebola Adeyoyin (6 November 1938 – 1 May 2021) was a University of Lagos professor and a princess from the Iji ruling house of Saki, Oyo State. She was the author of the Nigerian national pledge.

== Early life ==
Felicia Awujoola was born on 6 November 1938 in Ogbomoso, Oyo State. She attended Idi-Aba a Christian Baptist School from 1953 and graduated in 1957 from its teacher programme. In 1965 she married Solomon Adedeji Adeyoyin, who had attended Idi-Aba's brother school, the Baptist Boys' High School.

== Education ==
She received her Bachelor's Degree with honors in Geography from Birkbeck, University of London in 1968 and then her Diploma of Education at the same university in 1976, followed by an M.A. in Social Studies from Columbia University, New York in 1977, before finally earning her PhD in 1981 from the University of Lagos.

== Career ==
Adeyoyin was Professor of Education at the University of Lagos and a consultant for the United Nations.

In 1976, she wrote the pledge published in the July 15 edition of the Daily Times in an article titled "Loyalty to the Nation, Pledge". Then-Head of State Olusegun Obasanjo modified the pledge and introduced it as the national pledge, decreeing that school children should recite it during assembly.

Adeyoyin was also Deaconess of Yaba Baptist Church, Yaba.

== Death ==
Adeyoyin died on 1 May 2021 after a brief illness.

== Awards ==
In 2005, Adeyoyin was given a national award, the Officer of the Order of the Niger (OON).
