= Flag of Nigeria =

Federal Republic of Nigeria
- Use: National flag
- Proportion: 1:2
- Adopted: 1 October 1960; 66 years ago
- Design: A vertical bicolour triband of green, white and green.
- Designed by: Michael Taiwo Akinkunmi
- Use: State flag
- Proportion: 1:2
- Design: A vertical bicolour triband of a green, white and green; charged with the coat of arms in the centre.
- Use: Civil ensign
- Proportion: 1:2
- Design: A red field with the national flag, in the canton
- Use: State ensign
- Proportion: 1:2
- Design: A blue field with the national flag, in the canton
- Use: Naval ensign
- Proportion: 1:2
- Design: A white field with the national flag in the canton, with the Naval seal in the fly.
- Use: Air force ensign
- Proportion: 1:2
- Design: A sky-blue field with the national flag in the canton, with the air force roundel in the fly.

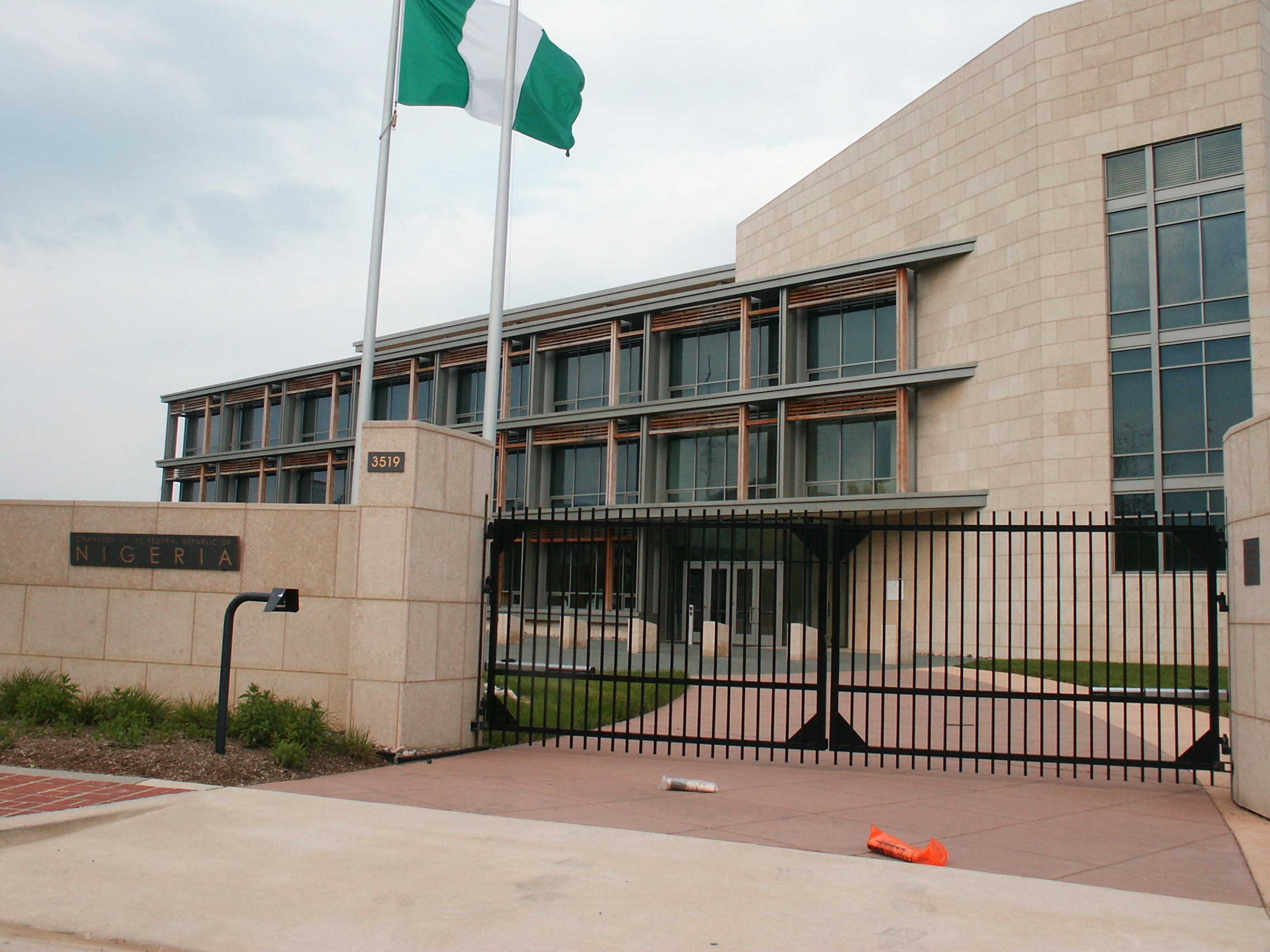
Nigerian flag at the Nigerian embassy in Washington, DC

The flag of Nigeria was designed by Taiwo Akinkunmi and was officially adopted to represent Nigeria at midnight on 1 October 1960, the day the country gained independence from the United Kingdom. The flag was chosen as part of a nationwide open contest held by the government, with Akinkunmi's design being selected as the winner of a field of over three thousand entries. The flag is a vertical bicolour green-white-green design, with green representing agriculture and white representing peace and unity.

The flag was raised for the first time in a ceremony by Lieutenant David Ejoor of the Army Guard.

== History and design ==
In preparation for the independence of Nigeria from the British Empire, a national planning committee was established which set a competition to select a national flag in 1958. In 1959, out of almost 3,000 entries, Michael Taiwo Akinkunmi won the competition with an equal green-white-green with a 16-ray red quarter sun on the white stripe was chosen. After acceptance, the committee removed the red quarter sun.

The accepted flag now consists of a vertical bicolour green-white-green; the green stands for agriculture and the white stands for unity and peace. On 1 October 1960, the modern-day flag became the official flag of an independent Nigeria and was raised for the first time in a ceremony by Lieutenant David Ejoor.

Flag of the Protectorate of Nigeria (1914–1960)

Akinkunmi's original design

Final design

== Historical and variant flags ==
In the late 17th century, present-day Nigeria was made up of diverse ethnic groups without national flags. After the amalgamation of the Southern Nigeria Protectorate and Northern Nigeria Protectorate in 1914, Lord Lugard designed a new flag for Nigerian Protectorate, consisting of a blue field with the Union Jack in the canton, and a red disc on the fly side, within it a green hexagram surrounding the royal crown and "Nigeria" written in white text below it.

The standard of the President of Nigeria from 1960 had a red field with a large green shield and fimbriated white in the centre.

It also features a black shield with a wavy-edged "Y"—representing the confluence of the Niger and Benue Rivers. There are three black scrolls containing the legend "President", "Federal Republic", "of Nigeria" placed on each scroll respectively in gold letters. This was replaced with the Nigerian coat of arms placed on the white stripe of the Nigerian flag; this also serves as the state flag.

== Colours ==
	Green	White
RGB	0/135/81	255/255/255
Hexadecimal	#008751	#FFFFFF

== See also ==
- National symbols of Nigeria
- List of Nigerian flags
