= Coat of arms of Nigeria =

Versions
- Version used from 1960 to 1979
- Armiger: Federal Republic of Nigeria
- Adopted: 20 May 1960
- Crest: An eagle displayed Gules.
- Torse: Argent and Vert
- Shield: Sable a Pall wavy argent
- Supporters: Two horses Argent
- Compartment: A grassy field proper, the yellow flowers at the base (incorrectly shown as red in the image) are Costus Spectabilis, Nigeria's national flower.
- Motto: Unity and Faith, Peace and Progress

The coat of arms of Nigeria consists of a black shield with a wavy white pall, symbolising the meeting of the Niger and Benue Rivers at Lokoja. The black shield represents Nigeria's fertile soil, while the supporting horses or chargers on each side represent dignity. The red eagle represents strength, while the green and white twists of the torse on the top of the shield represent the colours of the Nigerian Flag.

The red flowers at the base are Costus spectabilis, Nigeria's national flower. This flower was chosen for inclusion in the coat of arms as it is found all over Nigeria and also stand for the beauty of the nation. On the banderole around the base is Nigeria's national motto since 1978: "Unity and Faith, Peace and Progress" (formerly "Peace, Unity, Freedom").

== Blazon ==
Sable a Pall wavy argent, supported by two horses Argent, and set for a crest on a wreath, Argent and Vert, an eagle displayed Gules.

== Government seals ==
Seal of the president

Seal of the vice president

Seal of the Senate

Seal of the House of Representatives

== Historical emblems ==
Badge of the British West African Settlements

Badge of the Lagos Colony

Badge of the Oil Rivers Protectorate

Badge of the Niger Coast Protectorate

Badge of the Northern Nigeria Protectorate

Badge of the Southern Nigeria Protectorate

Badge of Colonial Nigeria (1914–1952, Green star of David on red disk)

Badge of Colonial Nigeria (1952–1960, Green star of David on red disk)

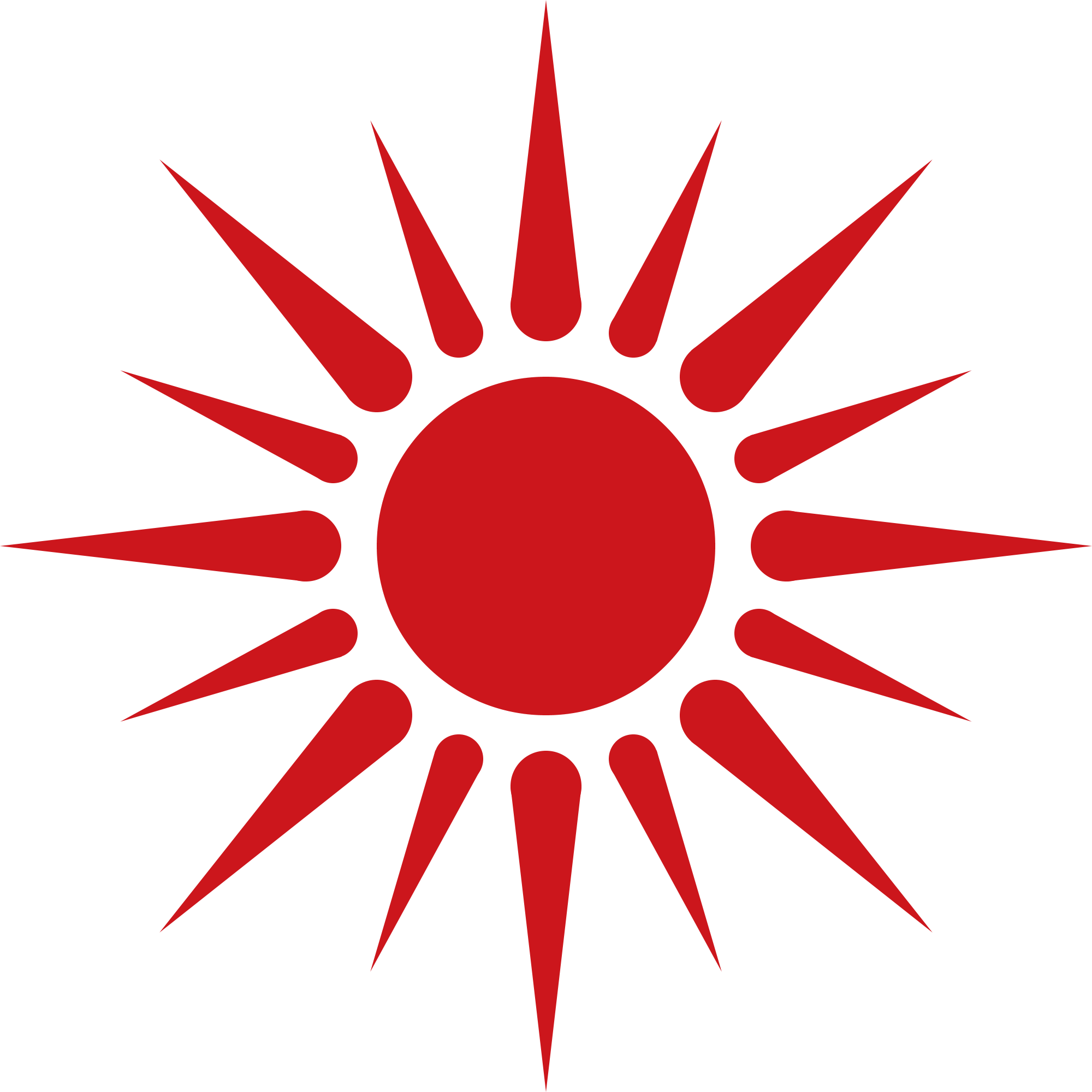
Akinkunmi's Red Sun of Nigeria.

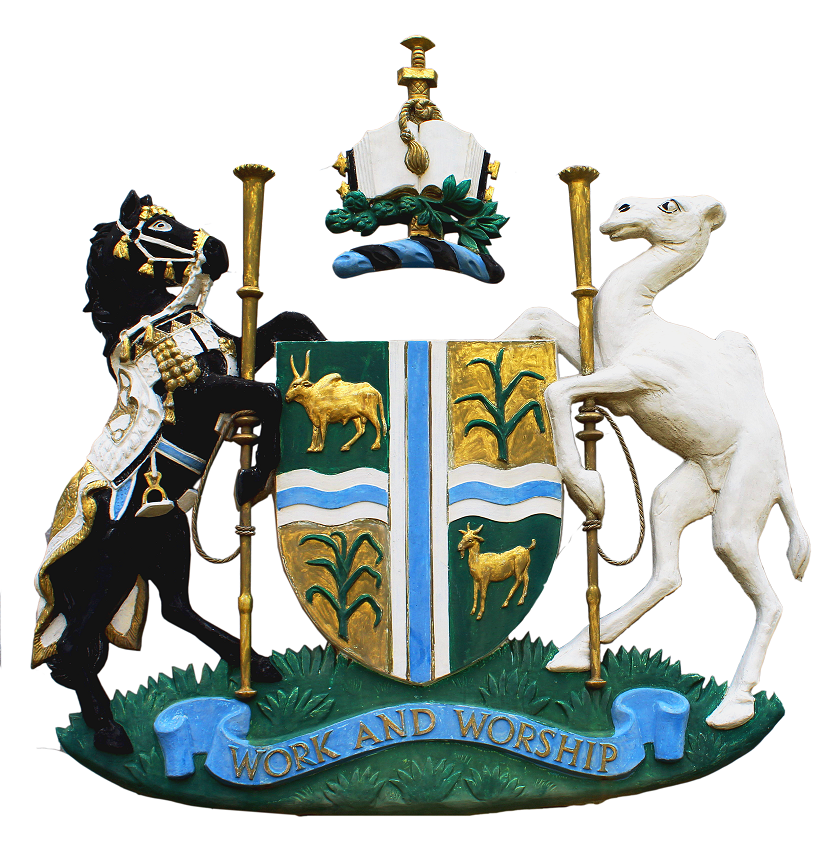
Coat of arms of the defunct government of Northern Nigeria

== Sub-national emblems ==
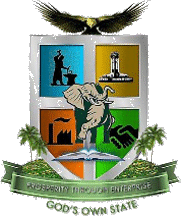
Abia State

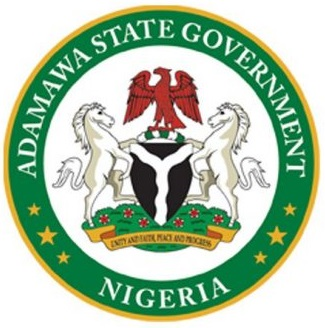
Adamawa State

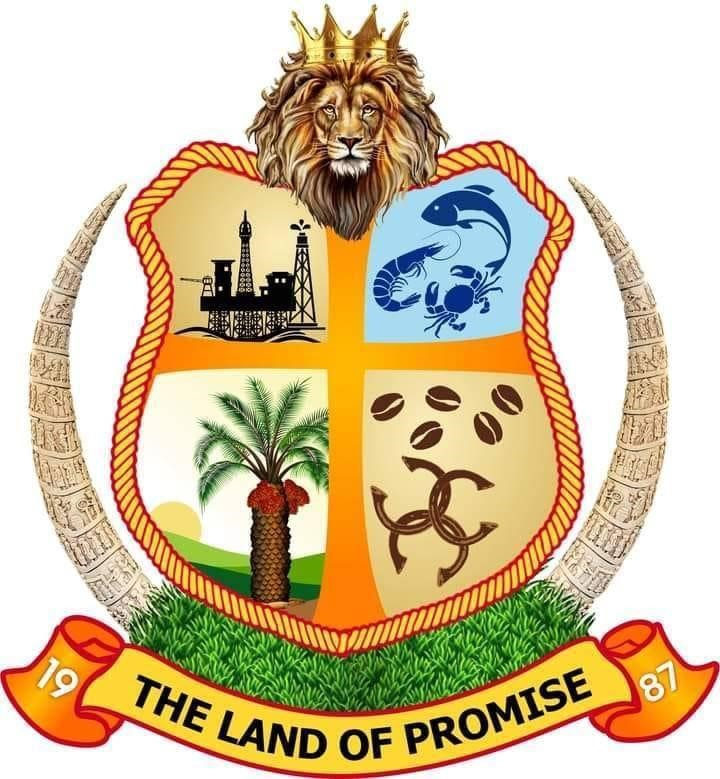
Akwa Ibom State

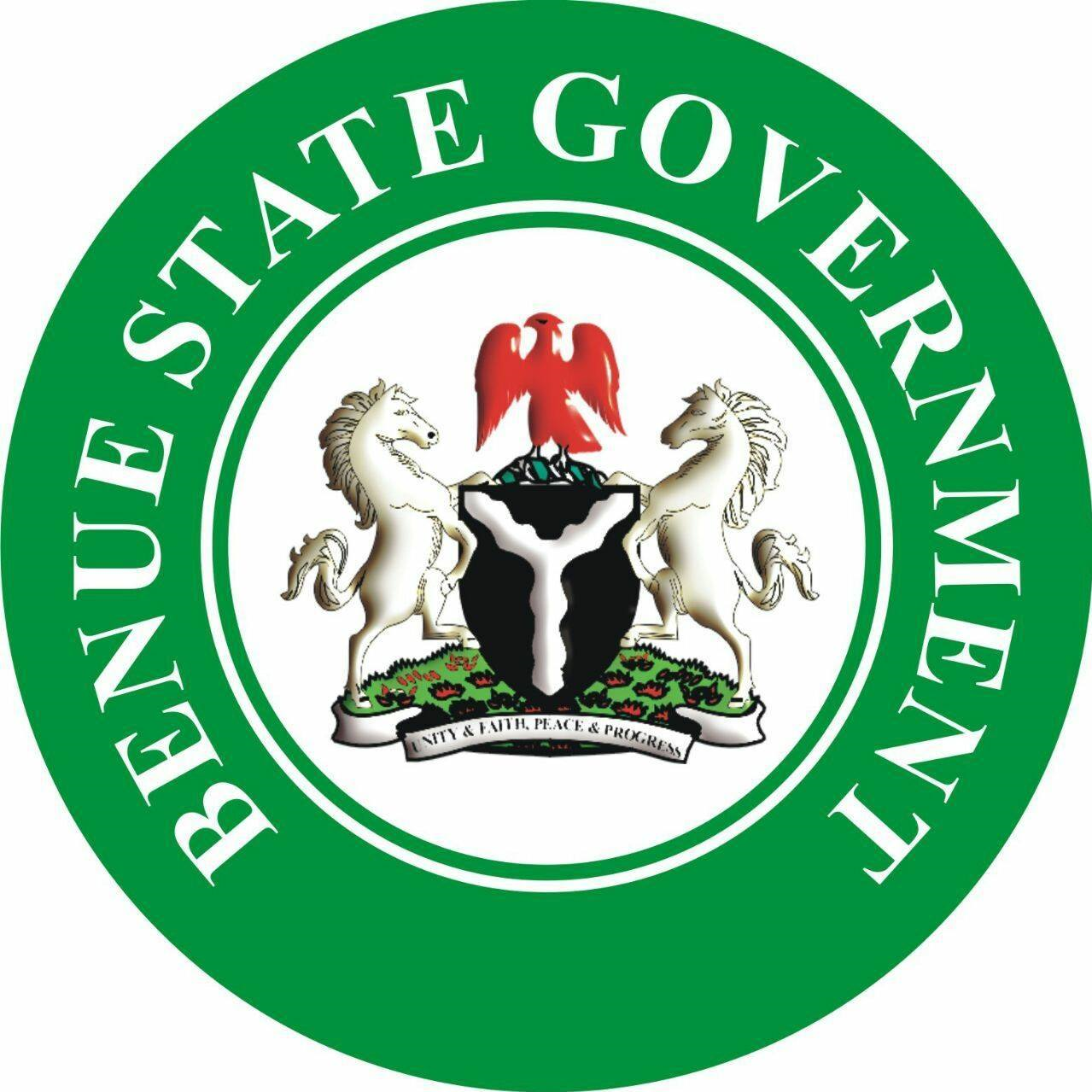
Benue State

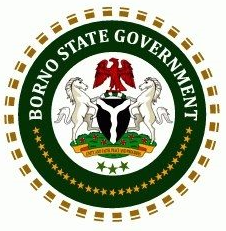
Borno State

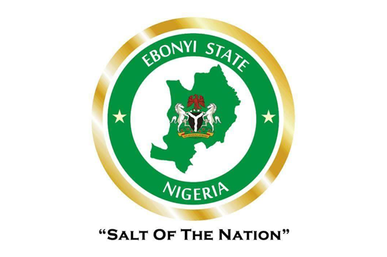
Ebonyi State

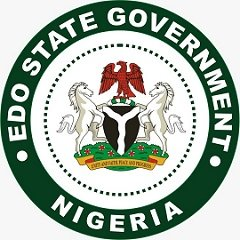
Edo State

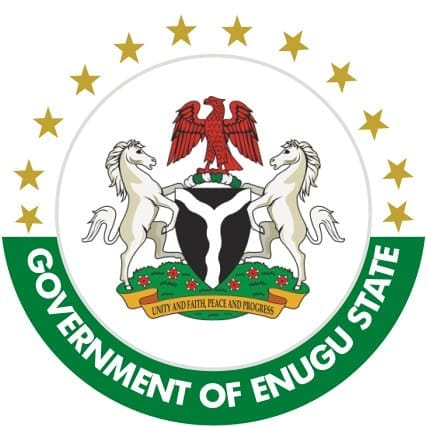
Enugu State

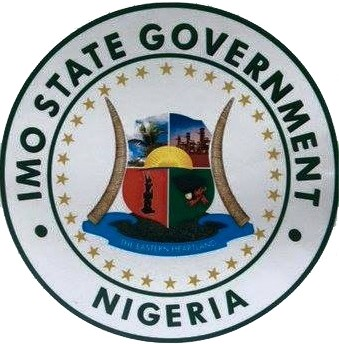
Imo State

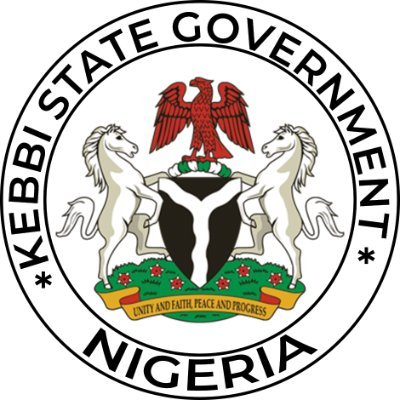
Kebbi State

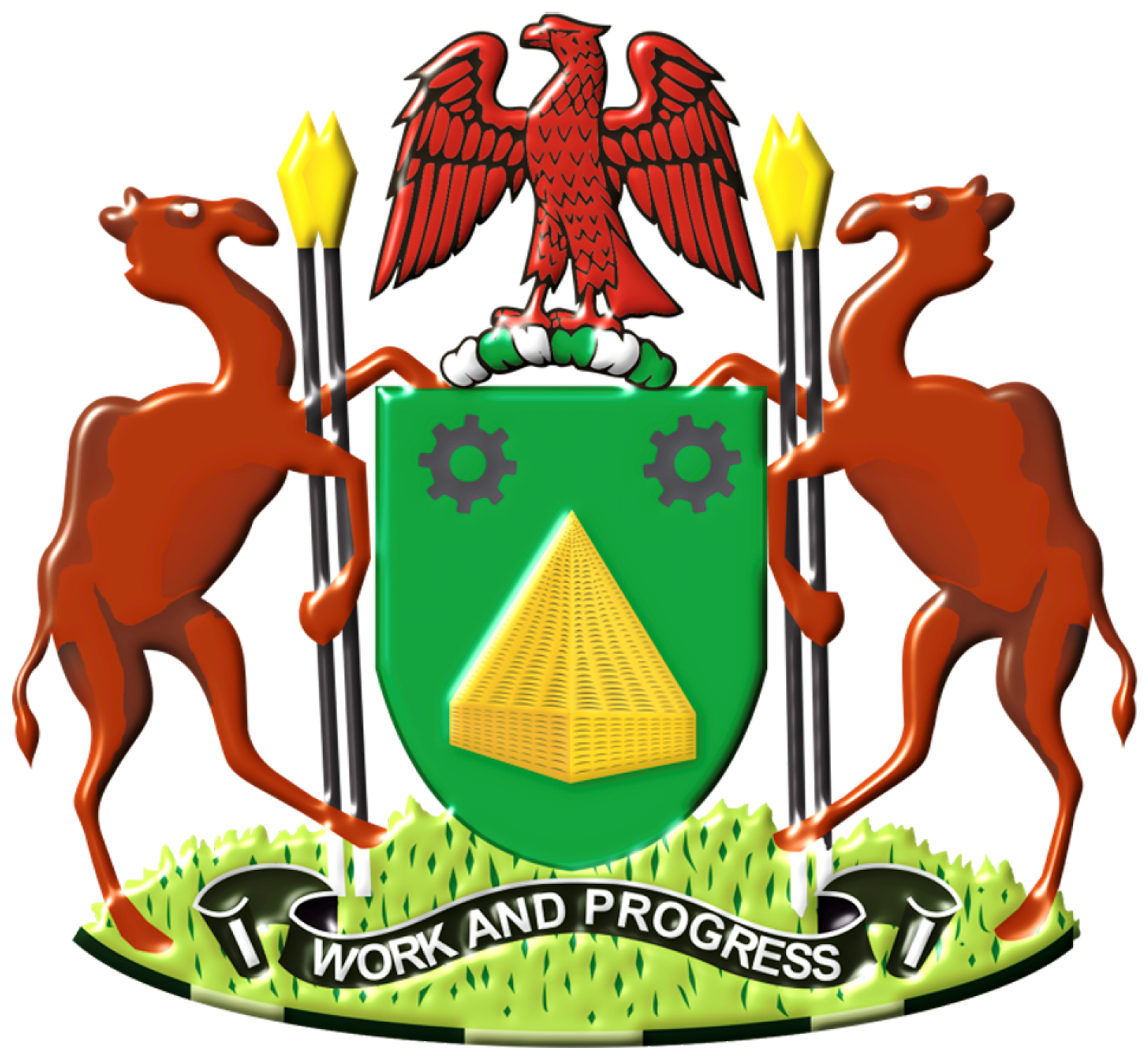
Kano State

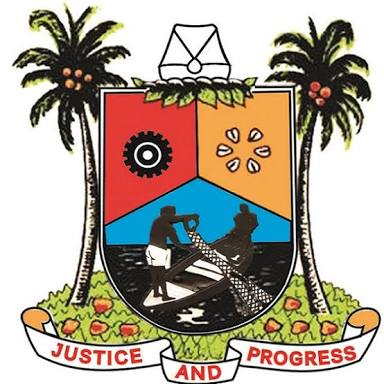
Lagos State

Nasarawa State

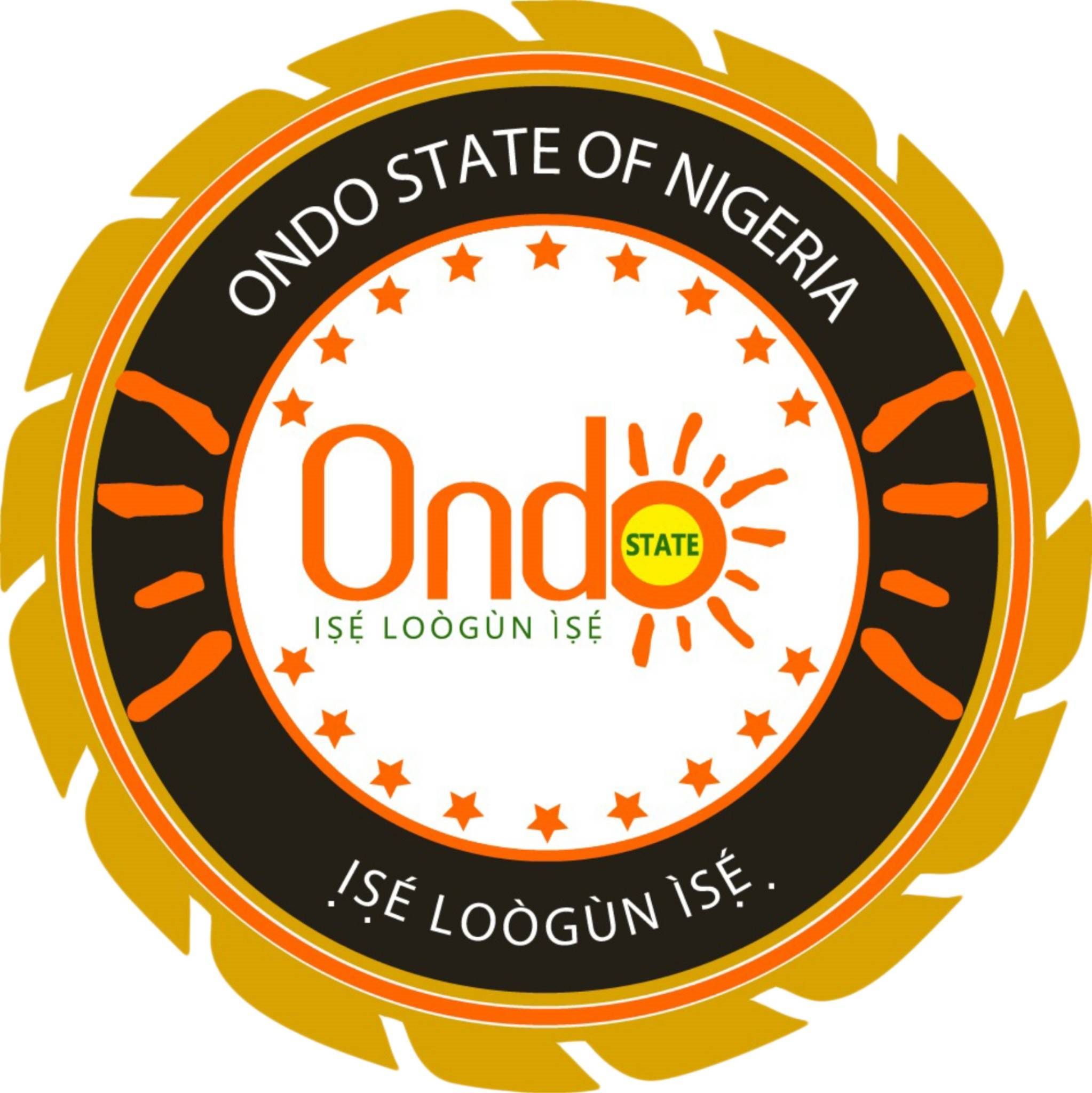
Ondo State

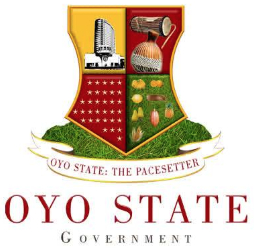
Oyo State

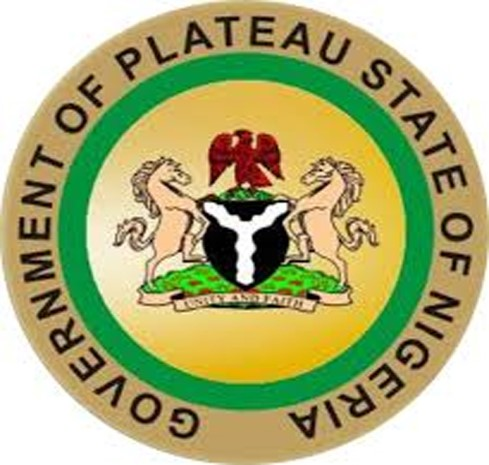
Plateau State

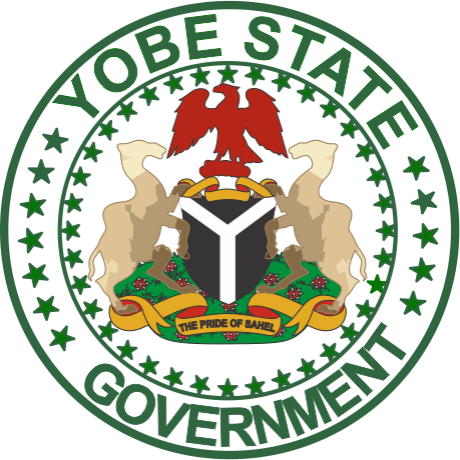
Yobe State

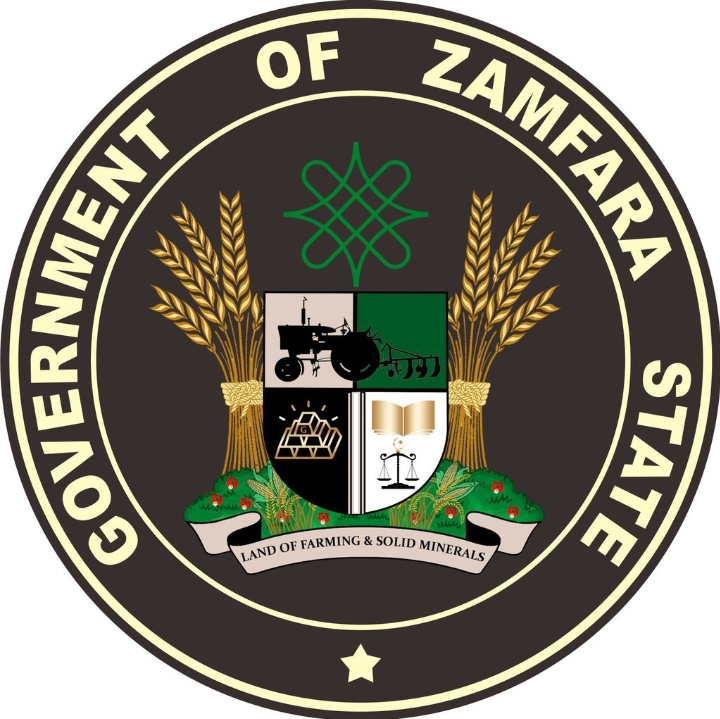
Zamfara State

== See also ==
- Nigerian heraldry
- Seal of the president of Nigeria
- Flag of Nigeria
