= Taiwo Akinkunmi =

Nigerian civil servant (1936–2023)

Michael Taiwo Akinkunmi OFR
- Born: Michael Taiwo Akinkunmi; 10 May 1936; Abeokuta, Colony and Protectorate of Nigeria
- Died: 29 August 2023 (aged 87); Ibadan, Oyo State, Nigeria
- Other names: Michael
- Occupations: Electrical engineer, retired Nigerian civil servant
- Years active: 1958–2023

Michael Taiwo Akinkunmi OFR (10 May 1936 – 29 August 2023) was a Nigerian civil servant who was best known for designing Nigeria's national flag. He was commonly referred to as Mr. Flag Man.

== Early life and career ==
Michael Taiwo Akinkunmi was born in Ibadan, of Yoruba origin, the older of a set of twins. He lived with his father until he was 8 years old before he relocated to the Northern part of Nigeria. He began his early education in the North. After his father's retirement, he came down to the West and was re-enrolled at Baptist Day School, Idi-Ikan in Ibadan. He finished from Baptist Day School Idi-kan in 1949, and proceeded to Ibadan Grammar School (IGS) in 1950 where he enjoyed a very good education.

Akinkunmi left IGS in 1955 and took an appointment as an agriculturist at the Western Region Secretariat in Ibadan as a civil servant. He would then work some years before gaining admission to the Norwood Technical College, currently known as Lambeth College in London where he studied electrical engineering. While studying there, he designed the Nigerian Flag. He returned to Nigeria in 1963 and went back to the agricultural department at the secretariat in Ibadan to continue where he stopped. He worked as a civil servant until 1994, when hired as Assistant Superintendent of Agriculture. He was honoured as an Officer of the Order of the Federal Republic (OFR) and honorary life presidential adviser on 29 September 1994 at the Abuja Conference Centre.

== Designing Nigeria's national flag ==
Akinkunmi entered the competition which he came across in a library. In his own words, "I took details of what is [to be] expected to design a flag that would be used by a country that was about to witness [its] independence. I took part in the competition and my design was selected as the best in the year 1958." In 2021, Akinkunmi unveiled the world’s largest national flag in Ibadan, the Oyo state capital.

Akinkunmi's Original design

Final design

== Personal life and death ==
Akinkunmi was married with a wife and had children. He died on 29 August 2023, at the age of 87 after a brief illness. Despite promises by the federal government to hold a state funeral for him, no such ceremony was held, and the Oyo State government decided instead to help arrange the funeral scheduled in September 2024.
