= List of Czech flags =

This is a list of flags used in the Czech Republic to further history.

== Current flags ==
=== State flag ===
Flag	From	Use	Description	Ratio
	1 January 1993	Flag of the Czech Republic	Two equal horizontal bands of white and red with a blue isosceles triangle based on the hoist side.	2:3
	1 January 1993	Flag of the Czech Republic (vertical display)	The same flag, rotated and flipped over to place the hoist at the top and the white band at the left.	2:3
Czech Republic	1 January 1993	Variant; vertical hoisting hanging flag	Same as the ordinary flag of the Czech Republic, but stretched to be much longer. Traditionally used as a ceremonial flag for hanging on buildings. Used also on 30 March 2020 on the 100th anniversary of the adoption of the flag in Prague.	1:9
	1 January 1993	Ribbon of the national colours	Ribbon of white, red, and blue is one of the national symbols of the Czech Republic.	–
	1 January 1993	Flag of the President	Greater coat of arms with inscription of national motto Pravda vítězí.	1:1

=== Governmental flags ===
==== Military flags ====
===== Banners of the Armed Forces =====
Each branch of the Armed Forces of the Czech Republic has a representative banner, each branch of the Army of the Czech Republic like Czech Land Forces, the Czech Air Force, and Special Forces has representative banner which together represents the entire Armed Forces as a whole.

Obverse (Front)	Reverse (Back)	Date	Use	Description	Ratio
		20 February 1993	Banner of the Prague Castle Guard	Banner represents Prague Castle Guard. The obverse side of the banner is formed by a blue field and in its center is the emblem of the Castle Guard. Below is a dark blue inscription with the motto of Pravda vítězí. The reverse is also formed by blue field. To the tip to the upper edge, a white sword with a yellow leaves. From the sword to the pole there is a yellow sprig with 15 yellow linden leaves, and from the sword to the fluttering edge is a yellow sprig with yellow leaves and white laurel berries. Above the emblem is the dark blue inscription Hradní stráží, below it in the same color is inscription of year 1993. In the bottom is golden signature of President Václav Havel who granted the banner to the guard in 1993.	1:1
		1993	Banner of the General Staff of the Army	Banner represents the Chief of the General Staff. Obverse side shows same insignia of the greater coat of arms of the Czech Republic same for all branches of the Army. Reverse side shows emblem of the General Staff of the Army with golden linden leaves.	1:1
		1993	Banner of the Czech Land Forces	Banner represents the Czech Land Forces. Obverse side shows same insignia of the greater coat of arms of the Czech Republic same for all branches of the Army. Reverse side shows emblem of Czech Land Forces with golden linden leaves.	1:1
		1993	Banner of the Czech Air Force	Banner represents the Czech Air Forces. Obverse side shows same insignia of the greater coat of arms of the Czech Republic same for all branches of the Army. Reverse side shows emblem of Czech Land Forces with golden linden leaves.	1:1
	?	2004	Banner of the University of Defence	Banner represents the University of Defence. Obverse side shows same insignia of the greater coat of arms of the Czech Republic same for all branches of the Army. Reverse side shows emblem of the University in the yellow field with green linden leaves.	1:1

==== Banners of special forces ====
Obverse (Front)	Reverse (Back)	Date	Use	Description	Ratio
?	?	2020	Banner of the Security Information Service	Banner represents intelligence agency. The banner shows the emblem of the Security Information Service and on the reverse side the greater coat of arms held by two two-tailed lion.	

==== River pennants ====
Flag	Date	Use	Description	Ratio
		State Navigation Authority ^{cs}	River police pennant. White with a square blue mascle.	

==== Parliamentary flags ====
Flag	Date	Use	Description	Ratio
	2019–present	Flag of the Committee for Heraldry and Vexillology of the Chamber of Deputies of the Czech Republic^{cs}	Similar to the flag of the Czech Republic but with the blue triangle extended to the full length of the flag, with the emblem of the committee (a crowned double-tailed lion holding a flag and a shield).	2:3

=== Subnational flags ===
==== Historic regions ====
Flag	Administrative division	Adopted
	Bohemia	
	Moravia	
	Czech Silesia	

==== Regional flags ====
Flag	Administrative division	Adopted
	Prague	28 April 1891
	Central Bohemian Region	27 November 2001
	South Bohemian Region	22 November 2002
	Plzeň Region	31 January 2002
	Karlovy Vary Region	27 June 2001
	Ústí nad Labem Region	9 April 2002
	Liberec Region	8 October 2001
	Hradec Králové Region	8 October 2001
	Pardubice Region	27 June 2001
	Vysočina Region	14 March 2001
	South Moravian Region	25 November 2003
	Olomouc Region	27 June 2001
	Zlín Region	22 November 2002
	Moravian-Silesian Region	13 November 2001

== Historical flags ==
=== National flags ===
Flag	Date	Use	Description	Ratio
	833–907	Vexilloid of the Great Moravia	Vexilloid banner of a red-purple color.	–
	12th century	Banner of the Duchy of Bohemia	Banner with black eagle of the Přemyslid dynasty.	–
	14th century	Banner of the Kingdom of Bohemia	Banner with two-tailed lion in red field.	–
	12th century	Banner of the Margraviate of Moravia	Banner with white-red-checkered eagle with golden claws.	–
	1806–1918		Bicolour of white and red.	2:3
	1916–1918	Flag of the Czechoslovak National Council in Paris	Blue flag with two bands, white over red, emerging from the hoist and nearly reaching the fly edge. Centred on the bands is a golden inscription "ČS" representing Czechs and Slovaks. Atop the staff carrying the flag is a finial of four interlaced rings representing Bohemia, Moravia, Silesia, and Slovakia.	2:3
	1918–1920	Flag of Czechoslovakia	Bicolour of white and red.	2:3
	1939–1945	Flag of the Protectorate of Bohemia and Moravia	Tricolour flag of white, red, and blue.	2:3
	1990–1992	Flag of the Czech Republic in Czech and Slovak Federative Republic		2:3

=== Military flags ===
==== War flags ====
Obverse (Front)	Reverse (Back)	Date	Use	Description	Ratio
	?	1918	Banner of Czechoslovak Volunteers from the USA	Banner presented to Czechoslovak First World War volunteers departing from New York City, 22 June 1918.	
	?	1919	Banner of the Czechoslovak Legion	Banner granted to the First Assault Battalion of the Czechoslovak Legion on 2 February 1919 in Yekaterinburg.	
		1954–1960	Banner of the Czechoslovak People's Army	Banner granted to the army by Minister of National Defence General Alexej Čepička after creation of the Czechoslovak People's Army in 1954.	
		1960–1990	Banner of the Czechoslovak People's Army	Banner granted to the Army in 1960 with the new socialist coat of arms of Czechoslovakia.	

=== Hussite Wars ===
Flag	Date	Use	Description
	1419–1434	Hussite banner	
	1420s–1434	Taborites banner	
	1420s–1434	Bohuslav of Švamberg banner	
	1420s–1434	Orebites banner	Banner with pelican used by Orebites and later Orphans.
	1420s–1434	Praguers banner	The "Prague Banner". During the Hussite Wars the city militia fought under this banner. Later banner was captured by Swedish troops in 1649 and placed in the Royal Military Museum in Stockholm

== University flags ==
Flag	Date	Use	Description
	2015–present	Flag of the Brno University of Technology	Public university established in 1899
	2011–present	Flag of the Palacký University Olomouc	Public university established in 1573
	2001–present	Flag of the Tomas Bata University in Zlín	Public university established in 2001
	2017–present	Flag of the Masaryk University	Public university established in 1919
	2016–present	Flag of the University of Ostrava	Public university established in 1991
	2009–present	Flag of the University of West Bohemia	Public university established in 1991

== Organizations ==
=== Firefighting Associations flags ===
Flag	Date	Use	Description	Ratio
?	1995–present	Flag of the Firefighters Association of Bohemia, Moravia and Silesia^{cs}	Adopted in 1995.	2:3

=== Vexillology Associations flags ===
Flag	Date	Use	Description
	1976–present	Flag of Czech Vexillological Society^{cs}	Member of the International Federation of Vexillological Associations
	1994–present	Flag of Flag Data Center	Member of the International Federation of Vexillological Associations

=== Sport Associations flags ===
Flag	Date	Use	Description
	2019–present	Flag of Sokol	
	1930s–2019	Flag of Sokol	
	1912	Flag that the Bohemian team competed under at the 1912 Olympics.	

== Political flags ==
Flag	Date	Party	Description
Current
	2015–present	Civic Democratic Party	
	1945–1948; 1997–present	Czech National Social Party	
	2017–present	Svobodní	
	2017–present	Czech Pirate Party	
	2023–present	Social Democracy	
	1990–present	Communist Party of Bohemia and Moravia	
	2023–present	Czech Sovereignty of Social Democracy	
	?–present	Communist Youth Union	
Former
	?–2022	Masaryk Democratic Party	
	2017–2022	Green Party	
	2021–2023	Czech Social Democratic Party	
	1990–2002	Rally for the Republic – Republican Party of Czechoslovakia	
	2016–2026	Rally for the Republic – Republican Party of Czechoslovakia	
	2003–2010	Workers' Party	
	2012–2026	Christian and Democratic Union – Czechoslovak People's Party	
Link to file	1989–2005	Party for Life Security	
Czechoslovakia
	?–1990	Communist Party of Czechoslovakia	
	1933–1938	Sudeten German Party	
	1928–1942	Vlajka	
	1927–1938	Young Generation of the Czechoslovak People's Party	
	1919–1938	Farmers' League	
	1932–1939	Freedom Guard Union	
	1936–1939	Purple Legion	
Other
	2022	Flag of "Královec Region"	

== Religious flags ==
=== Roman Catholic flags ===
Flag	Date	Use	Description
		Flag of the Roman Catholic Archdiocese of Prague	
		Flag of the Roman Catholic Archdiocese of Olomouc	
		Flag of the Roman Catholic Diocese of České Budějovice	
		Flag of the Roman Catholic Diocese of Brno	

=== Other Christian flags ===
Flag	Date	Use	Description
		Flag of the Evangelical Church of Czech Brethren	Flag of the main protestant church in the Czech Republic.
		Universal Hussite flag	Modern universal Hussite flag used by state authorities as well as the Czechoslovak Hussite Church or the Moravian Church.

== Ethnic groups flags ==
Flag	Date	Use	Description
	?–present	Flag of Chods	
	1920s–1945	Flag of Sudeten Germans	
	2010–present	Flag of Moravians	Flag of Moravians used by the Moravian National Community since 1990.

== Proposed flags ==
Flag	Date	Use	Description
	1992	Proposed Flag for the Czech Republic	

== House flags ==
Flag	Date	Use	Description
	1922–1992	Czechoslovak Elbe-Oder Shipping Company	
	1959–1992	Czechoslovak Ocean Shipping	

== Yacht club flags ==
Flag	Club	Ratio
	Yacht Club Lodní sporty Brno	
	YCR – Jachting Roudnice nad Labem	

== See also ==
- List of Slovak flags
- Flag of the Czech Republic
- Coat of arms of the Czech Republic
- National symbols of the Czech Republic
