= List of royal standards =

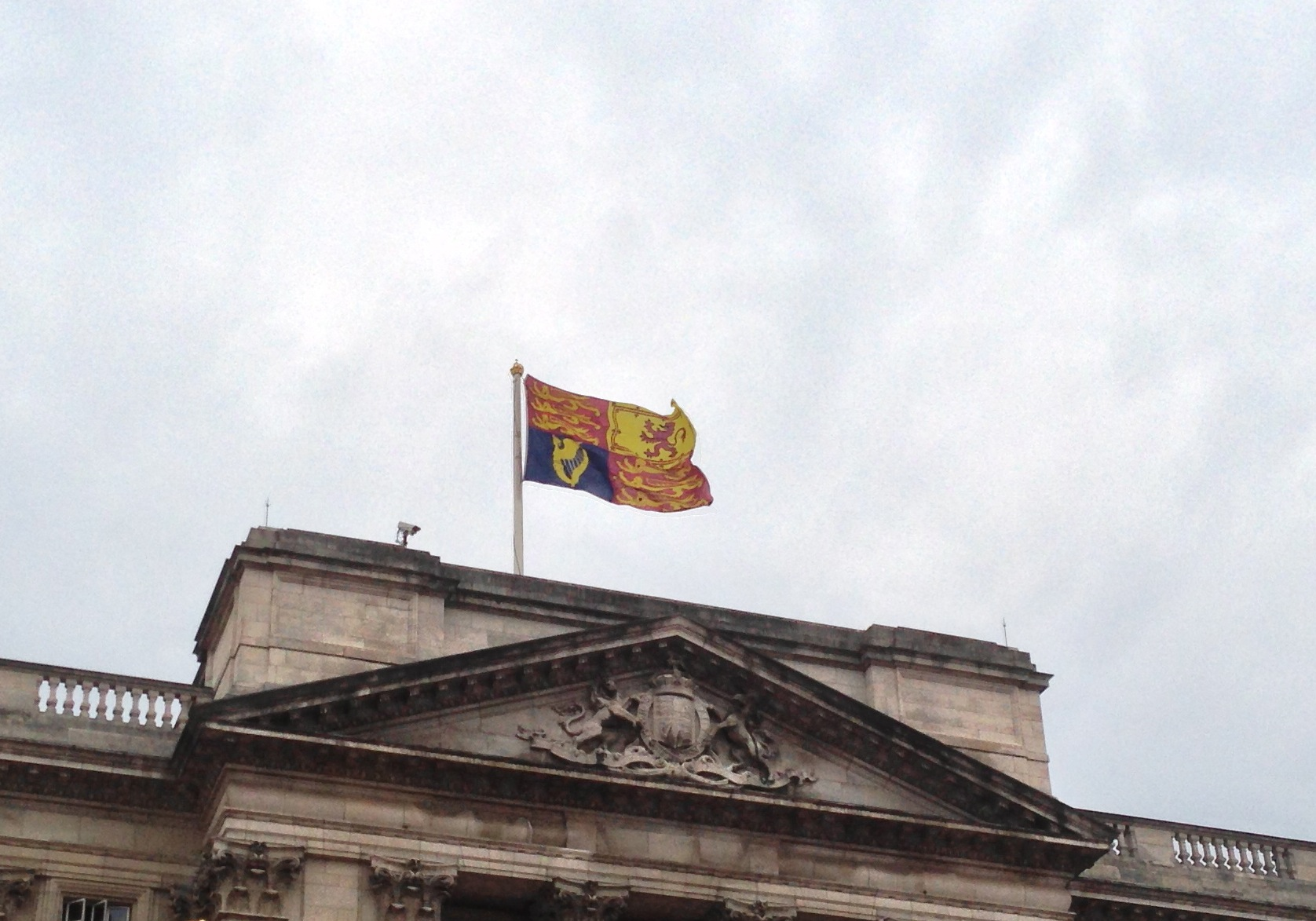
Buckingham Palace Royal Standard

Royal standard, royal flag, or royal banner may refer to:

== Flags ==
Several countries use the term royal standard to describe the flag used by the monarch and members of the royal family:

- Royal Standard of Australia
- Royal Standard of Bahrain
- Royal Standard of Belgium
- Royal Standard of Brunei
- Royal Standard of Cambodia
- Royal Standards of Canada
- Royal Standard of Denmark
- Royal Standard of Eswatini
- Royal Standard of Jamaica
- Royal Standard of Jordan
- Royal Standard of Lesotho
- Princely Standard of Liechtenstein
- Grand Ducal Standard of Luxembourg
- Royal Standard of Malaysia
- Princely Standard of Monaco
- Royal Standard of Morocco
- Royal Standard of the Netherlands
- Royal Standard of New Zealand
- Royal Standard of Norway
- Royal Standard of Oman
- Royal Standard of Saudi Arabia
- Royal Standard of Spain
- Royal Standard of Sweden
- Royal Standard of Thailand
- Royal Standard of Tonga
- Royal Standard of the United Kingdom
  - Princely standard of Wales (for the Prince of Wales)

=== Former royal standards ===
- Royal Standard of Afghanistan (1931–1973)
- Royal Standard of the Nawab of Baoni (before 1948)
- Royal Standard of Barbados (1975–2021)
- Royal Standard of the Maharaja of Baroda (before 1948)
- Royal Standard of the Tsar of Bulgaria (before 1946)
- Royal Bend of Castile, the battle standard of the Castilian monarchs (from the Middle Ages to the 16th century)
- Royal Standard of the Maharana of Danta (before 1948)
- Royal Standard of Egypt (1923–1953)
- Royal Banner of England (c. 1198–1603)
- Royal Standard of France (before 1792; 1814–1830)
- Royal Standard of Germany (1871–1918)
- Royal Standard of Greece (1863–1924; 1936–1974)
- Royal Standard of the Maharaja of Gwalior (before 1948)
- Royal Standard of Hawaii (1874–1893)
- Royal Standard of Iraq (1930–1958)
- Royal Standard of Italy (1880–1946)
- Royal Standard of the Maharaja of Jaisalmer (still in use)
- Royal Standard of Korea
- Royal Standard of Laos (1949–1975)
- Royal Standard of Libya (1951–1969)
- Royal Standard of Madagascar (before 1885)
- Royal Standard of Malta (1967–1974)
- Royal Standard of Mauritius (1968–1992)
- Royal Standard of Montenegro (1861–1918)
- Royal Standard of Nepal (1928–2008)
- Royal Standard of Portugal (until 1910)
- Royal Standard of Romania (1881–1947)
- Royal Banner of Scotland
- Royal Standard of Serbia (1902–1917)
- Royal Standard of Trinidad (1966–1976)
- Royal Standard of Vietnam (1788–1955)
- Royal Standard of Yugoslavia (1922–1941)

== Other ==
- Royal Standard (1863), an auxiary steamer ship of the White Star Line

== See also ==
- Imperial standard
- Presidential standard
