= Somali flag =

Somali Flag may refer to:

- Flag of Somalia
- Flag of Somaliland
