= Presidential standard =

List of Presidential standards by country

The presidential standard of Italy. The standard recalls the colors of the flag of Italy, with particular reference to the standard of the historic Italian Republic of 1802–1805; the square shape and the savoy blue border, whose use was maintained even in the Republican era, symbolize the Italian Armed Forces, which are commanded by the president. Blue in heraldry also metaphorically symbolizes command.

The presidential standard or presidential flag is the flag that is used in many countries as a symbol of the head of state or president. In some countries it may be for exclusive use of the president or only raised where the president is present. An equivalent in a monarchy is a royal standard, and in an empire, an imperial standard.

== List ==
Note: Entries in bold font denote that the presidential standard has its own dedicated article.

=== Current Presidential standards ===
- Presidential standard of Abkhazia
- Presidential standard of Albania
- Presidential standard of Algeria
- Presidential standard of Angola
- Presidential standard of Argentina
- Presidential standard of Armenia
- Presidential standard of Austria
- **Presidential standard of Azerbaijan**
- Presidential standard of Bangladesh
- Presidential standard of Barbados
- **Presidential standard of Belarus**
- Presidential standard of Botswana
- Presidential standard of Brazil
- Presidential standard of Burkina Faso
- Presidential standard of the Central African Republic
- Presidential standard of Chad
- Presidential standard of Chile
- **Presidential standard of Colombia**
- Presidential standard of DR Congo
- Presidential standard of Croatia
- Presidential standard of Cuba
- Presidential standard of Cyprus
- Presidential standard of the Czech Republic
- Presidential standard of Dominica
- Presidential standard of the Dominican Republic
- Presidential standard of Ecuador
- Presidential standard of Egypt
- Presidential standard of Eritrea
- Presidential standard of Estonia
- Presidential standard of Fiji
- Presidential standard of Finland
- **Presidential standard of France**
- Presidential standard of Gabon
- Presidential standard of The Gambia
- Presidential standard of Georgia
- **Presidential standard of Germany**
- Presidential standard of Ghana
- Presidential standard of Greece
- Presidential standard of Guatemala
- Presidential standard of Guinea
- Presidential standard of Guinea-Bissau
- Presidential standard of Guyana
- Presidential standard of Haiti
- Presidential standard of Hungary
- Presidential standard of Iceland
- Presidential standard of Indonesia
- Presidential standard of Ireland
- Presidential standard of Israel
- **Presidential standard of Italy**
- Presidential standard of Kazakhstan
- Presidential standard of Kenya
- Presidential standard of South Korea
- Presidential standard of Kosovo
- Presidential standard of Kyrgyzstan
- Presidential standard of Latvia
- Presidential standard of Liberia
- Presidential standard of Lithuania
- Presidential standard of Madagascar
- Presidential standard of Malawi
- Presidential standard of Maldives
- Presidential standard of Malta
- Presidential standard of Mauritania
- Presidential standard of Mauritius
- Presidential standard of Mexico
- Presidential standard of Moldova
- Presidential standard of Montenegro
- Presidential standard of Mozambique
- Presidential standard of Namibia
- Presidential standard of Nigeria
- Presidential standard of Northern Cyprus
- **Presidential standard of Pakistan**
- Presidential standard of Palau
- Presidential standard of Palestine
- Presidential standard of Panama
- Presidential standard of Paraguay
- Presidential standard of Peru
- **Presidential standard of the Philippines**
- **Presidential standard of Poland**
- Presidential standard of Portugal
- Presidential standard of Romania
- Presidential standard of Russia
- Presidential standard of Rwanda
- Presidential standard of São Tomé and Príncipe
- Presidential standard of Serbia
- Presidential standard of Seychelles
- Presidential standard of Sierra Leone
- Presidential standard of Singapore
- Presidential standard of Slovakia
- Presidential standard of Slovenia
- Presidential standard of Somaliland
- Presidential standard of South Ossetia
- Presidential standard of South Sudan
- Presidential standard of Republika Srpska
- Presidential standard of the Sudan
- Presidential standard of Suriname
- Presidential standard of Syria
- Presidential standard of the Republic of China (Taiwan)
- Presidential standard of Tajikistan
- Presidential standard of Tanzania
- Presidential standard of Togo
- Presidential standard of Transnistria
- Presidential standard of Trinidad and Tobago
- Presidential standard of Tunisia
- **Presidential standard of Turkey**
- Presidential standard of Turkmenistan
- Presidential standard of Uganda
- **Presidential standard of Ukraine**
- Presidential standard of the United Arab Emirates
- **Presidential standard of the United States**
- Presidential standard of Uzbekistan
- Presidential standard of Vanuatu
- Presidential standard of Venezuela
- Presidential standard of Yemen
- Presidential standard of Zambia
- Presidential standard of Zimbabwe

=== Former presidential standards ===
- Presidential standard of Afghanistan (1974–1978, 2004–2021)
- Presidential standard of Czechoslovakia (1918–1939, 1945–1960)
- Presidential standard of the State of East Indonesia (1946–1950)
- Presidential standard of the German Democratic Republic (1951–1990)
- Presidential standard of the Chechen Republic of Ichkeria (1991–2007)
- **Presidential standard of India** (1950–1971)
- Presidential standard of Rhodesia (1970–1979)
- Presidential standard of South Africa (1961–1994)
- Presidential standard of the Spanish Republic (1931–1939)
- Presidential standard of Sri Lanka (1972–2022)
- Presidential standard of the United Arab Republic (1958–1972)
- Presidential standard of Upper Volta (1959–1984)
- Presidential standard of the Republic of Vietnam (1955–1975)
- Presidential standard of Yugoslavia (1949–1992)

== See also ==
- Gallery of head of state standards
- Heraldic standard
