= List of Tajik flags =

This is a list of flags used in Tajikistan.

== National flags ==
Flag	Date	Use	Description
	1992–present	National flag	An unequal horizontal tricolor of red, white, and green in a 2:3:2 ratio, with a yellow crown surmounted by an arc of seven stars at the center.
	1992–present	National flag	A variant of the national flag with color shades derived from the former flag of Iran (1933–1979).
	1992–present	Civil ensign	A unequal horizontal tricolor of red, white, and green in a 2:3:2 ratio to distinguish it from the flag of Hungary.

== Governmental flags ==
Flag	Date	Use	Description
	1992–present	Presidential standard of Tajikistan	A variant of the national flag charged with a gold Derafsh Kāviān extending beyond the central stripe with one seven-pointed star per corner and a winged lion at its center.

== Historical flags ==
Flag	Date	Use
	410–552	Flag of the Hephthalite Empire
	552–840	Flag of the Turkic Khaganate
	1321–1350	Flag of the Chagatai Khanate
	1685–1876	Flag of the Khanate of Kokand
	1869–1883	Flag of the Russian Empire
	1883–1918	Flag of the Russian Empire
	1918–1921	Flag of the Turkestan Autonomous Soviet Socialist Republic
	1929	Flag of the Tajik Autonomous Soviet Socialist Republic
	1929–1931	Flag of the Tajik Autonomous Soviet Socialist Republic
	1931–1935	Flag of the Tajik Soviet Socialist Republic
	1935–1936	Flag of the Tajik Soviet Socialist Republic
	1936–1938	Flag of the Tajik Soviet Socialist Republic
	1938–1940	Flag of the Tajik Soviet Socialist Republic
	1940–1953	Flag of the Tajik Soviet Socialist Republic
	1953–1991	Flag of the Tajik Soviet Socialist Republic
	1991–1992	Flag of Tajikistan

== Proposed flags ==
Flag	Date	Use
	1992	Proposal 1
	1992	Proposal 2

== See also ==
- Flag of Tajikistan
- Coat of Arms of Tajikistan
