= Gallery of head of state standards =

This gallery of head of state standards shows the presidential or royal standards, a flag that is related to the head of state of that country.

== A ==
Presidential flag of Abkhazia

Presidential standard of Albania

Presidential standard of Algeria

Presidential standard of Angola

Presidential standard of Argentina

Presidential flag of Armenia

King's Flag for Australia

Presidential standard of Azerbaijan

== B ==
Royal standard of Bahrain

Presidential standard of Bangladesh

Presidential standard of Barbados

Presidential standard of Belarus

Personal standard of King Philippe of Belgium

Presidential standard of Botswana

Presidential standard of Brazil

Royal standard of Brunei

Presidential standard of Burkina Faso

== C ==
Royal standard of Cambodia

Sovereign’s Flag for Canada

Presidential standard of Central African Republic

Presidential flag of Chad

Presidential flag of Chile

Presidential standard of Colombia

Presidential standard of Democratic Republic of the Congo

Presidential standard of Croatia

Presidential standard of Cuba

Presidential flag of Northern Cyprus

Presidential flag of Cyprus

Presidential standard of the Czech Republic

== D ==
Royal standard of Denmark

Presidential standard of Dominica

Presidential standard of the Dominican Republic (only used at Sea)

== E ==
Presidential standard of Ecuador

Presidential standard of Egypt

Presidential standard of Eritrea

Presidential flag of Estonia

Royal standard of Eswatini

== F ==
Presidential standard of Fiji

Presidential standard of Finland

Presidential standard of France

== G ==
Presidential standard of Gabon

Presidential standard of the Gambia

Presidential standard of Georgia

Presidential standard of Germany

Presidential standard of Ghana

Presidential standard of Greece

Presidential flag of Guatemala

Presidential standard of Guinea

Presidential standard of Guinea-Bissau

Presidential standard of Guyana

== H ==
Presidential standard of Haiti

Presidential standard of Hungary

== I ==
Presidential standard of Iceland

Presidential standard of Indonesia

Presidential standard of Ireland

Presidential standard of Israel

Presidential standard of Italy

== J ==
Imperial standard of Japan

Royal standard of Jordan

== K ==
Presidential standard of Kazakhstan

Presidential standard of Kenya

Flag of the chairman of the State Affairs Commission of North Korea

Presidential standard of South Korea

Presidential standard of Kosovo

Royal standard of Kuwait

Presidential standard of Kyrgyzstan

== L ==
Presidential flag of Latvia

Royal standard of Lesotho

Presidential standard of Liberia

Royal standard of Liechtenstein

Presidential standard of Lithuania

== M ==
Presidential standard of Madagascar

Presidential standard of Malawi

Royal standard of Malaysia

Presidential standard of Maldives

Presidential standard of Malta

Presidential flag of Mauritania

Presidential flag of Mauritius

Presidential flag of Mexico

Presidential standard of Moldova

Personal standard of Albert II of Monaco

Presidential standard of Montenegro

Royal flag of Morocco

Presidential standard of Mozambique

== N ==
Presidential standard of Namibia

Royal standard of the Netherlands

Presidential standard of Nigeria

Royal standard of Norway

== O ==
Royal standard of Oman

== P ==
Presidential standard of Pakistan

Presidential standard of Palau

Presidential flag of the Palestine

Presidential flag of Panama

Presidential standard of Paraguay

Presidential standard of Peru

Presidential standard of the Philippines

Presidential pennant of Poland

Presidential standard of Portugal

== R ==
Presidential flag of Romania

Presidential flag of Russia

Presidential standard of Rwanda

== S ==
Presidential standard of São Tomé and Príncipe

Royal standard of Saudi Arabia

Presidential standard of Serbia

Presidential flag of Seychelles

Presidential standard of Sierra Leone

Presidential standard of Singapore

Presidential standard of Slovakia

Presidential standard of Slovenia (only used at Sea)

Presidential flag of Somaliland

Presidential flag of South Sudan

Royal standard of Spain

Presidential standard of Sudan

Presidential standard of Suriname

Royal flag of Sweden

Presidential standard of Syria

== T ==
Presidential standard of Taiwan

Presidential standard of Tajikistan

Presidential standard of Tanzania

Royal standard of Thailand

Presidential standard of Togo

Royal standard of Tonga

Presidential flag of Transnistria

Presidential standard of Trinidad and Tobago

Presidential flag of Tunisia

Presidential flag of Turkey

Presidential standard of Turkmenistan

== U ==
Presidential standard of Uganda

Presidential standard of Ukraine

Presidential flag of the United Arab Emirates

Royal standard of the United Kingdom (in England)

Royal standard of the United Kingdom (in Scotland)

Presidential standard of the United States

Presidential standard of Uzbekistan

== V ==
Presidential standard of Vanuatu

Presidential standard of Venezuela

== Y ==
Presidential flag of Yemen

== Z ==
Presidential standard of Zambia

Presidential flag of Zimbabwe

== See also ==
- Gallery of head of government standards
