= Flag of the Czech Republic =

Czech Republic
- Use: Civil and state flag, national ensign
- Proportion: 2:3
- Adopted: 30 March 1920; 106 years ago (Czechoslovakia and later the Czech Republic)
- Design: Two equal horizontal bands of white (top) and red with a blue isosceles triangle based on the hoist side.
- Designed by: Jaroslav Kursa
- Use: Unit colour
- Proportion: 1:1
- Adopted: 1993; 33 years ago

The national flag of the Czech Republic is the same as the flag of the former Czechoslovakia. Upon the dissolution of Czechoslovakia in December 1992, the Czech Republic kept the Czechoslovak flag while Slovakia adopted its own flag. The first flag of Czechoslovakia was based on the flag of Bohemia and was white over red. This was almost identical to the flag of Poland (only the proportion was different) officially adopted in 1919, so a blue triangle was added at the hoist in 1920. The flag was banned by the Nazis in 1939 as they established a government nominally in control of Bohemia and Moravia, and a horizontal tricolour of white, red, and blue was used for the duration of the war. The 1920–1939 flag was restored in 1945. The flag was one of the only three flags of a socialist country in Europe without its coat of arms placed on center, when it was still part of Czechoslovakia at that time.

== History ==
The traditional colours of the Czech lands originated from an 1192 coat of arms (depicting a rampant lion with a double silver tail on a field of red).

After the establishment of an independent Czechoslovakia in 1918, the country had been using the red and white flag of Bohemia, almost identical to the Polish flag officially adopted in 1919. Following calls for a new flag to be adopted, a committee picked a design by Jaroslav Kursa, an archivist in the Czechoslovak Ministry of the Interior. His design included the red and white horizontal stripes derived from the coat of arms of Bohemia and added a blue triangle extending to the center of the flag.

The flag was officially approved by the National Assembly of Czechoslovakia on 30 March 1920 and since then, it has been in continuous use, with the exception of the German occupation of Czechoslovakia during the Second World War. Additionally, during a short period following the Velvet Revolution, between 1990 and 1992, the Czech part of the Czechoslovak federated state adopted the previous red and white flag.

During the 1992 negotiations on the split of Czechoslovakia, a clause forbidding the use of the state symbols of Czechoslovakia by either successor state was inserted into the legislation concerning the dissolution of the federation. However, the Czech Republic kept the use of the flag.

Medieval Banner of the Duchy of Bohemia under the Přemyslid dynasty

Medieval Royal Banner of arms of the Kingdom of Bohemia

Kingdom of Bohemia
until 1918

First Czechoslovak Republic
1918–1920

First and Second
Czechoslovak Republic
1920–1939
Czechoslovakia
1945–1992

Protectorate of
Bohemia and Moravia
1939–1945

Czech Republic within Czechoslovakia (1990–1992)

Czech Republic
since 1993

=== Czechoslovakia ===
Flag of Czechoslovakia.
(1920–1992)

Naval Ensign of Czechoslovakia.
(1930–1955)

Naval Ensign of Czechoslovakia.
(1955–1960)

War flag of Czechoslovakia.
(1960–1990)

==== Design contest (1918–1920) ====
Flag of the Czechoslovak National Council in Paris (1916–1918)

Original proposed flag by Jaroslav Kursa (1919)

Proposed flag by Czech and Slovak American Association in 1918

Czechoslovakia proposed flag in 1920

== Symbolism ==
All the colors of the flag are both symbolic and historic. White (or silver) is the traditional color of Bohemia and represents the sky. Red symbolizes Moravia and the "bloodshed for the freedom of the state." Blue used to symbolize Slovakia, but now symbolizes impartiality and sovereignty.

== Dimensions ==
Geometry

Vertical hoisting

The blazon of this flag is per pall fesswise Argent, Azure, and Gules. The flag is formed from an isosceles triangle that extends halfway along the rectangle (a common mistake is to draw it shorter) and two bands: one white and one red. The most similar foreign flag is the flag of the Philippines but the latter has dimensions 1:2, the three colours permuted, and additional golden-yellow symbols added on it.

Czech Republic tricolour

=== Flag colours ===
Czech law does not prescribe specific shades for the colours used in the national flag. The 1993 legislation refers only to the colours white, red, and blue, without providing detailed specifications regarding their exact tones. However, the law includes an annex featuring an illustration of the flag that employs saturated and rich versions of each colour.

== Presidential flag ==
Flag of the president
- Use: Presidential flag
- Proportion: 1:1
- Designed by: Jiří Louda

Another Czech official symbol is the flag of the president of the Czech Republic. It was first introduced in 1918 for the president of Czechoslovakia. The current version, which was designed by heraldist Jiří Louda, was adopted upon the creation of an independent Czech Republic in 1993.

== See also ==
- List of Czech flags

== Literature ==
- Zbyšek Svoboda, Pavel Fojtík: brochure Naše vlajka. Vznik a vývoj české vlajky (Our Flag. Origin and evolution of the Czech flag), Libea, 2005, ISBN 80-239-5862-3.
- Petr Exner, Pavel Fojtík, Zbyšek Svoboda: brochure Vlajky, prapory a jejich používání (Flags, banners and their use), Libea, 2004, ISBN 80-239-2873-2.
