= National symbols of the Czech Republic =

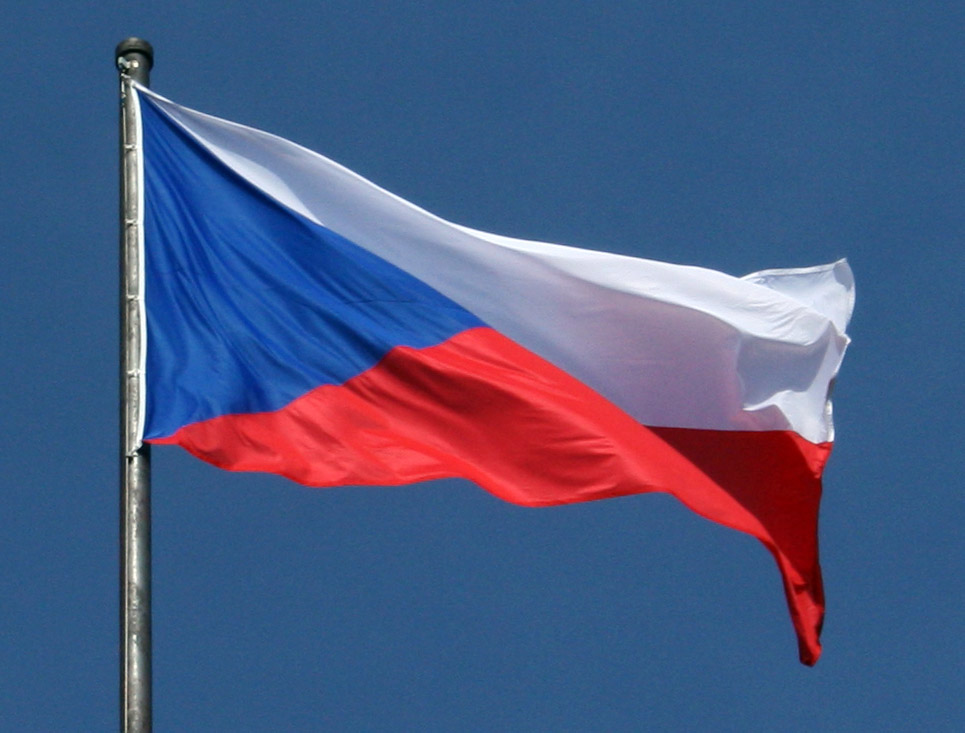
National flag of the Czech Republic, which was also the national flag of former Czechoslovakia

The national symbols of the Czech Republic are flags, heraldry, cultural expressions and other symbols that represent the Czech Republic, Czech people and their history, culture and nationhood. There are six official symbols which are declared in the Constitution of the Czech Republic. However many other historical, cultural and geographical symbols of the Czech republic and Czech people do exist.

== Constitutional symbols ==
Article 14 of the Constitution of the Czech Republic lists national symbols: the coat of arms, the official colours (white, red, and blue), the national flag, the flag of the president, the official seal and the national anthem. Act No. 3/1993 refers to the national symbols and their usage.

Coat of arms

small coat of arms

National colours of the Czech Republic (tricolour)

National flag

Flag of the president

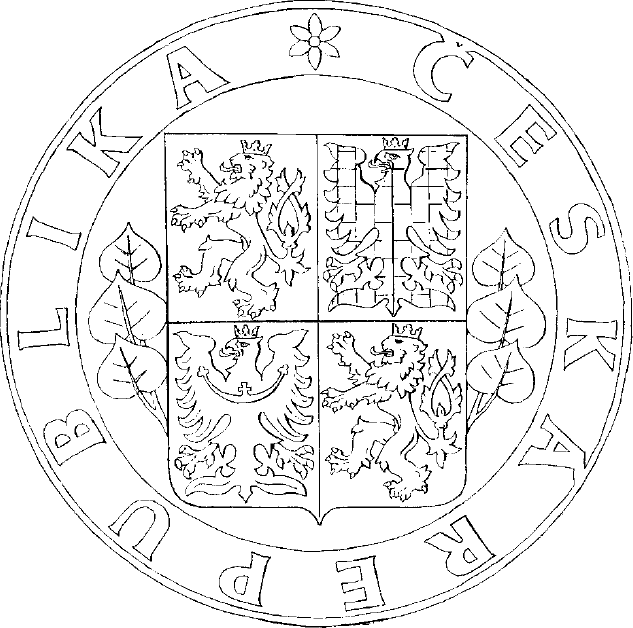
Official seal

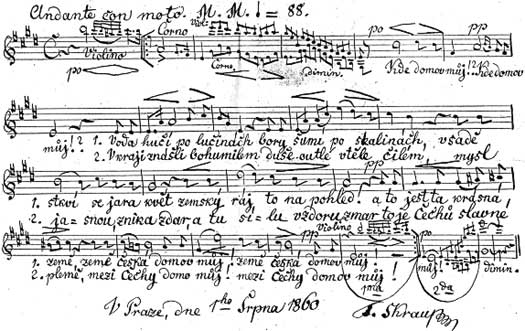
National anthem

== Symbols of Czech lands ==
The Czech republic includes three historical regions of Bohemia, Moravia and Czech Silesia. Each region has its own symbols.

=== Flags ===
Flag of Bohemia

Banner of Arms of Moravia

Another version of Moravian flag (used in the second half of the 19th century)

Flag of Czech Silesia

=== Coats of arms ===
Coat of arms of Bohemia

Coat of arms of Moravia

Coat of arms of Czech Silesia

== Unofficial symbols ==
=== Landmarks ===
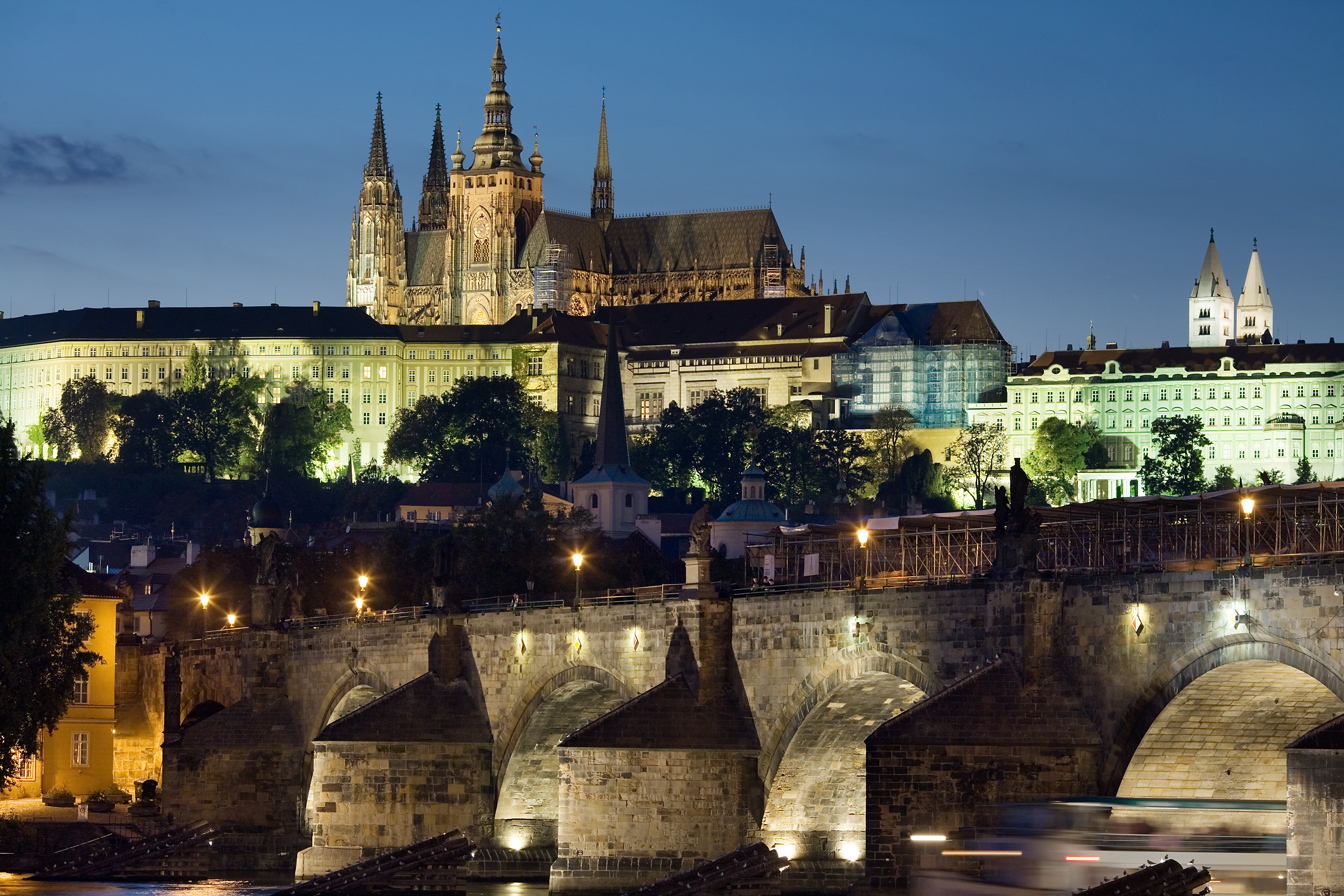
Prague and the Prague castle, former seat of Czech kings and the official residence of the President of the Czech Republic

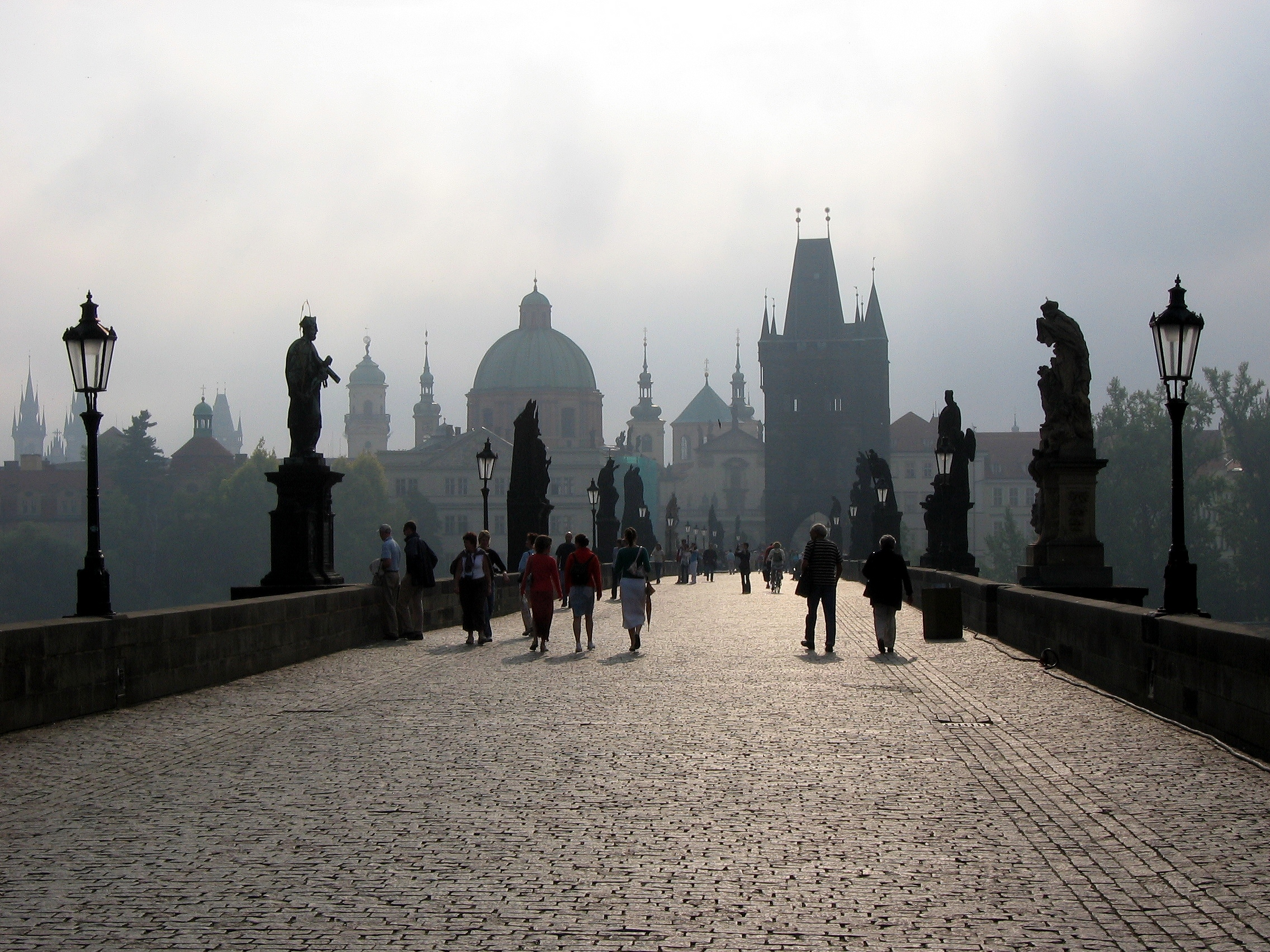
The Charles Bridge, famous Prague's historical sight

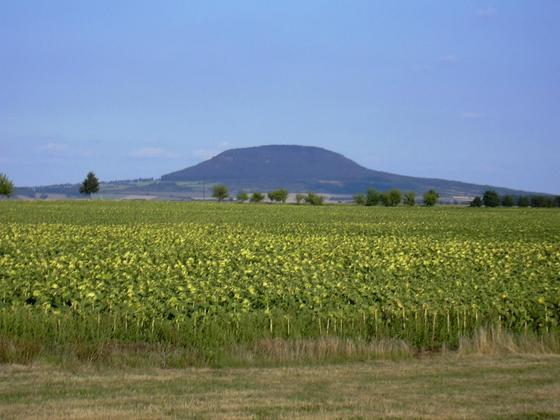
Říp Mountain, a legendary place where the first Slavs, led by Forefather Čech, settled

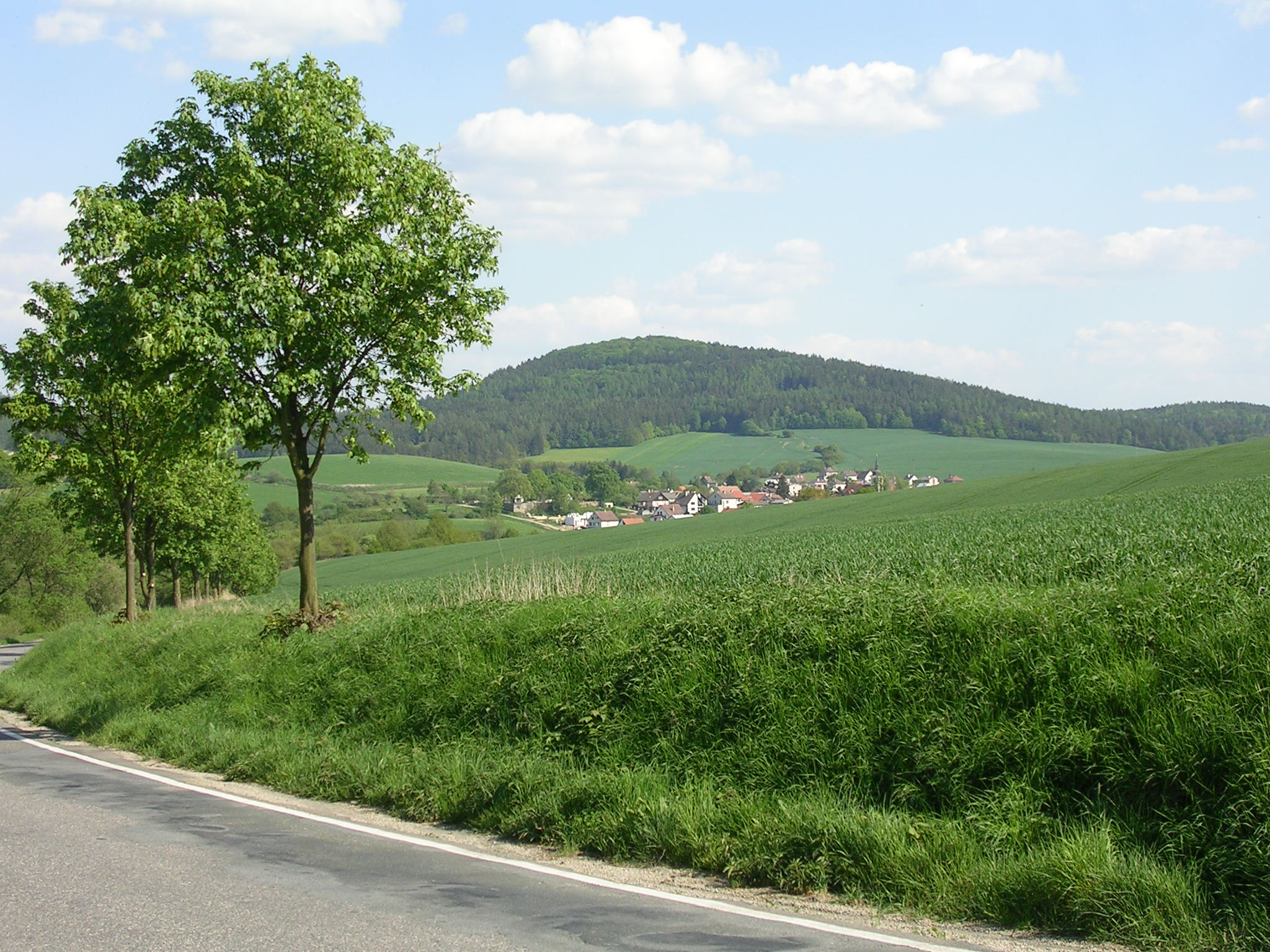
Blaník, a legendary mountain

=== People ===
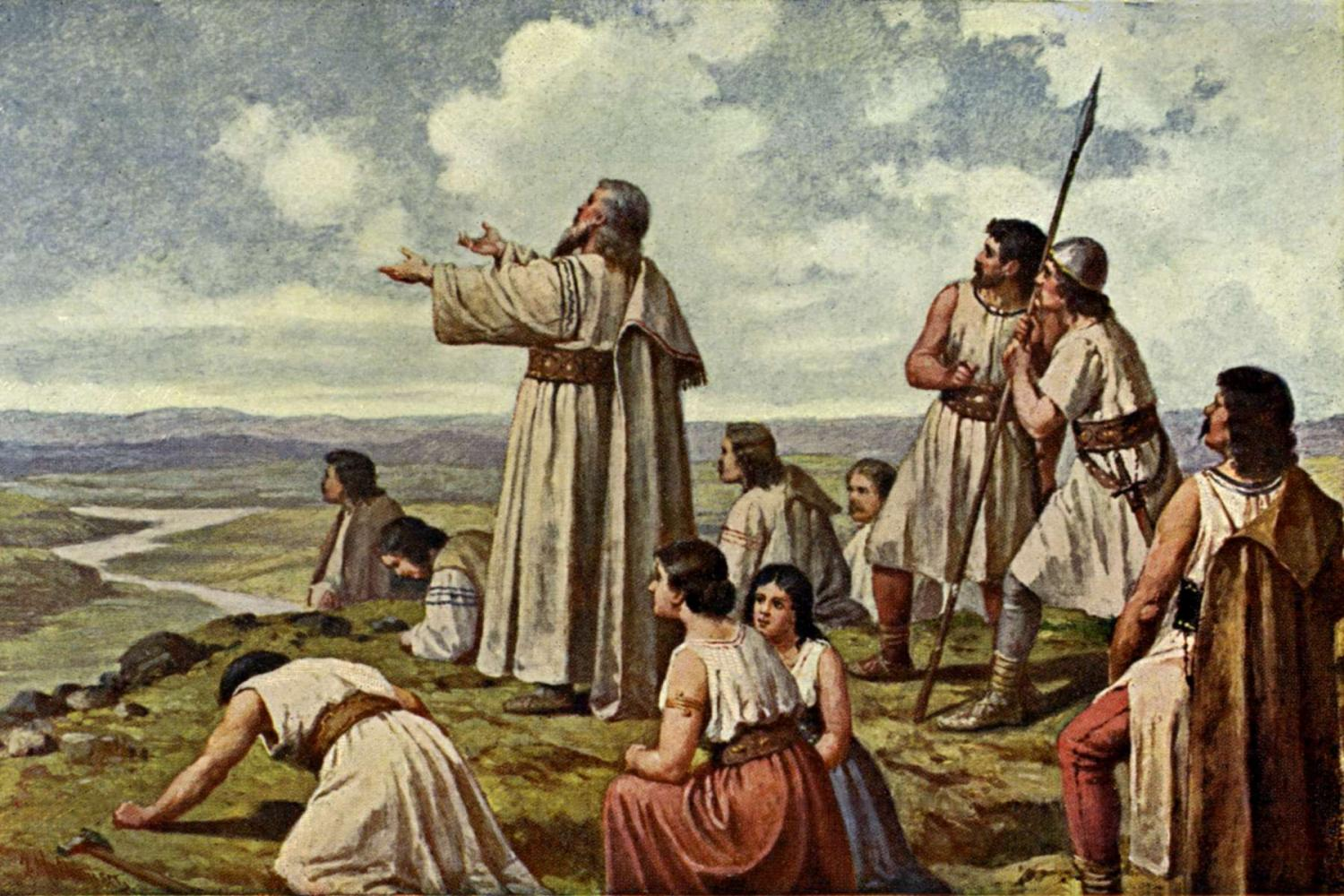
Forefather Čech (Czech: Praotec Čech), the legendary founder of Czech nation

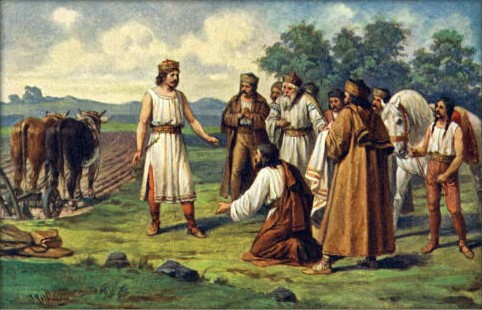
Přemysl, the Ploughman, the legendary founder of original Bohemian Přemyslid dynasty

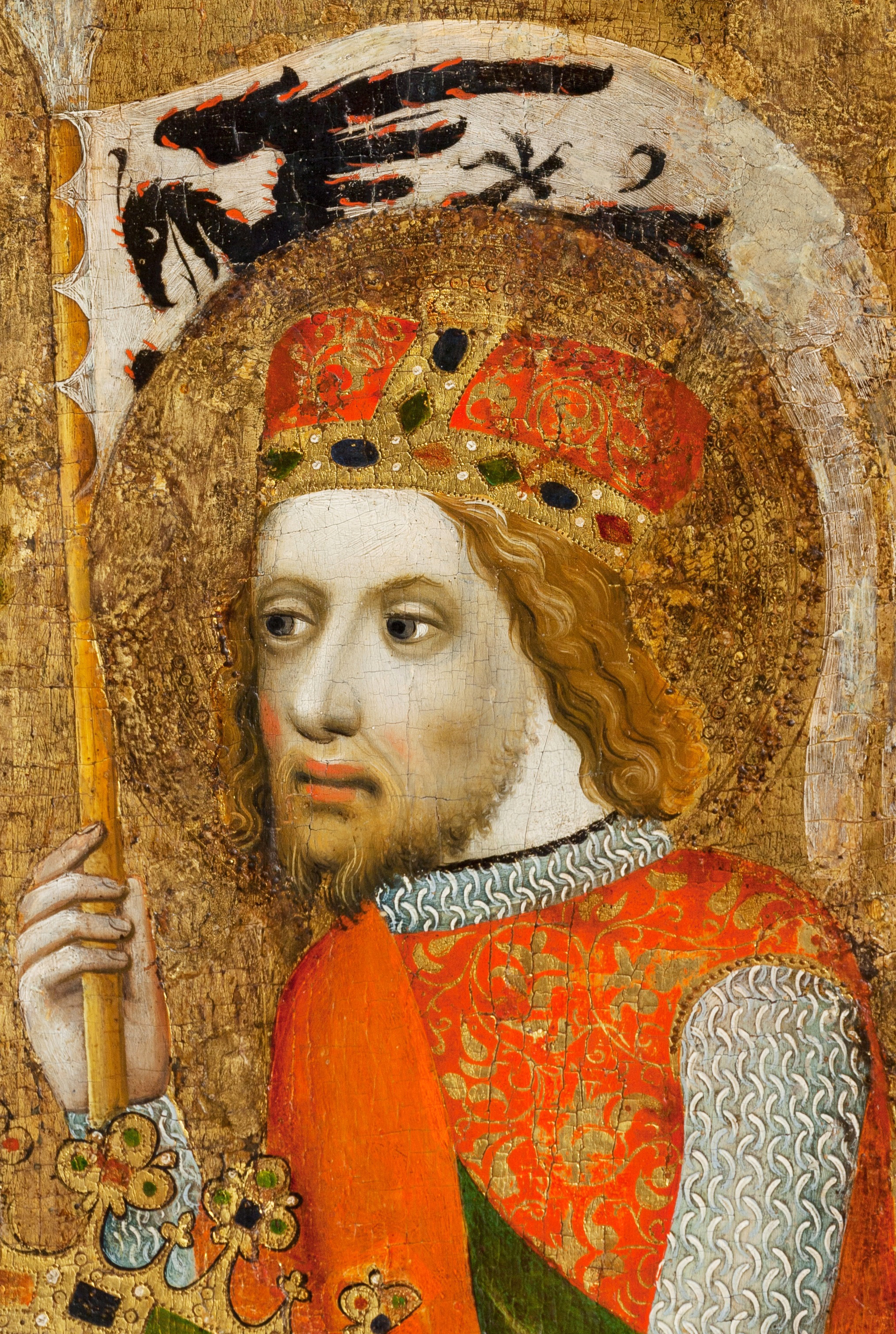
Wenceslaus I, Duke of Bohemia, the saint patron of the Czech state

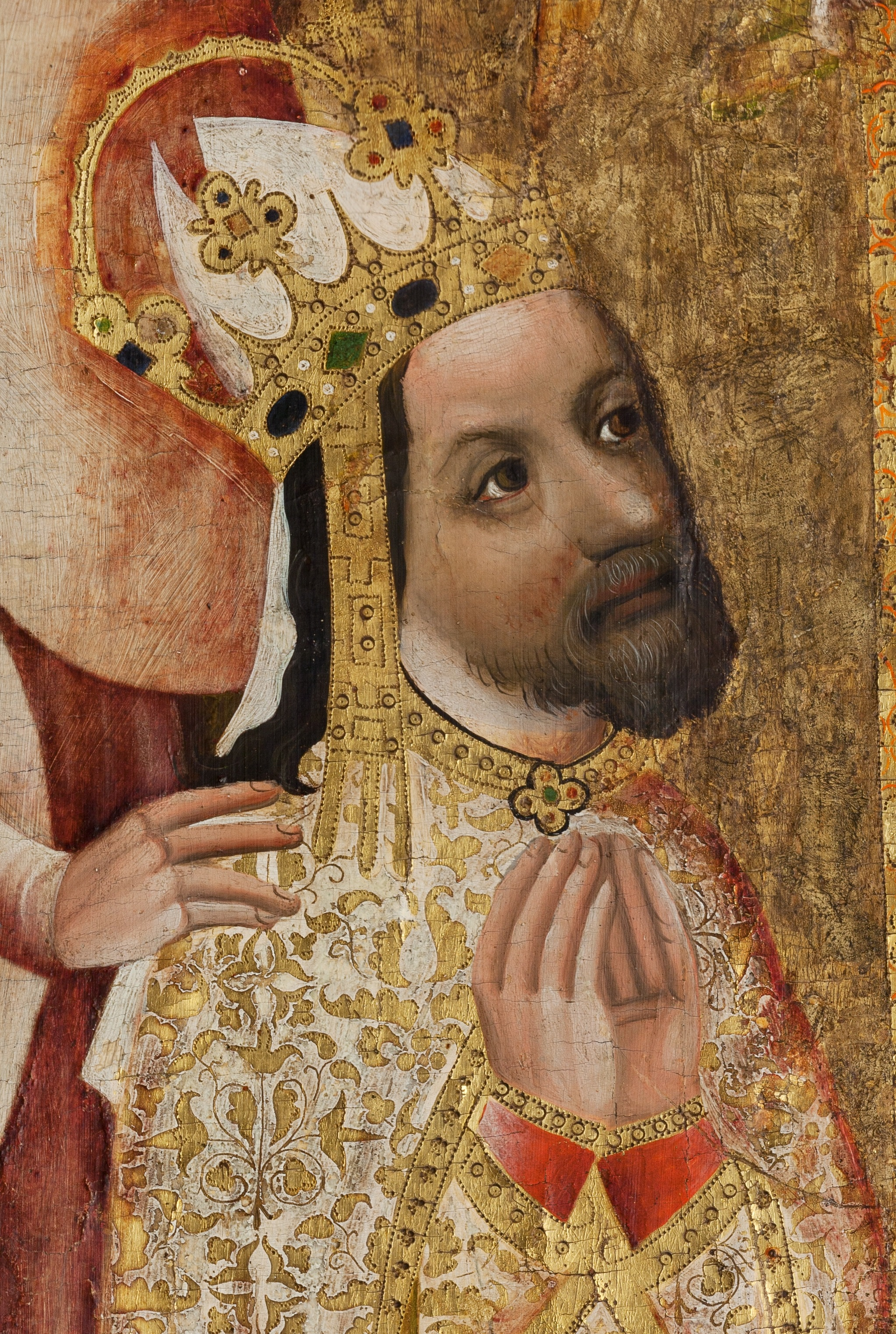
Charles IV, Holy Roman Emperor, one of the most significant Czech sovereigns

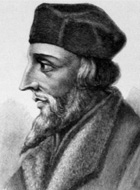
Jan Hus, religious reformist from the 15th century and spiritual father of the Hussite Movement

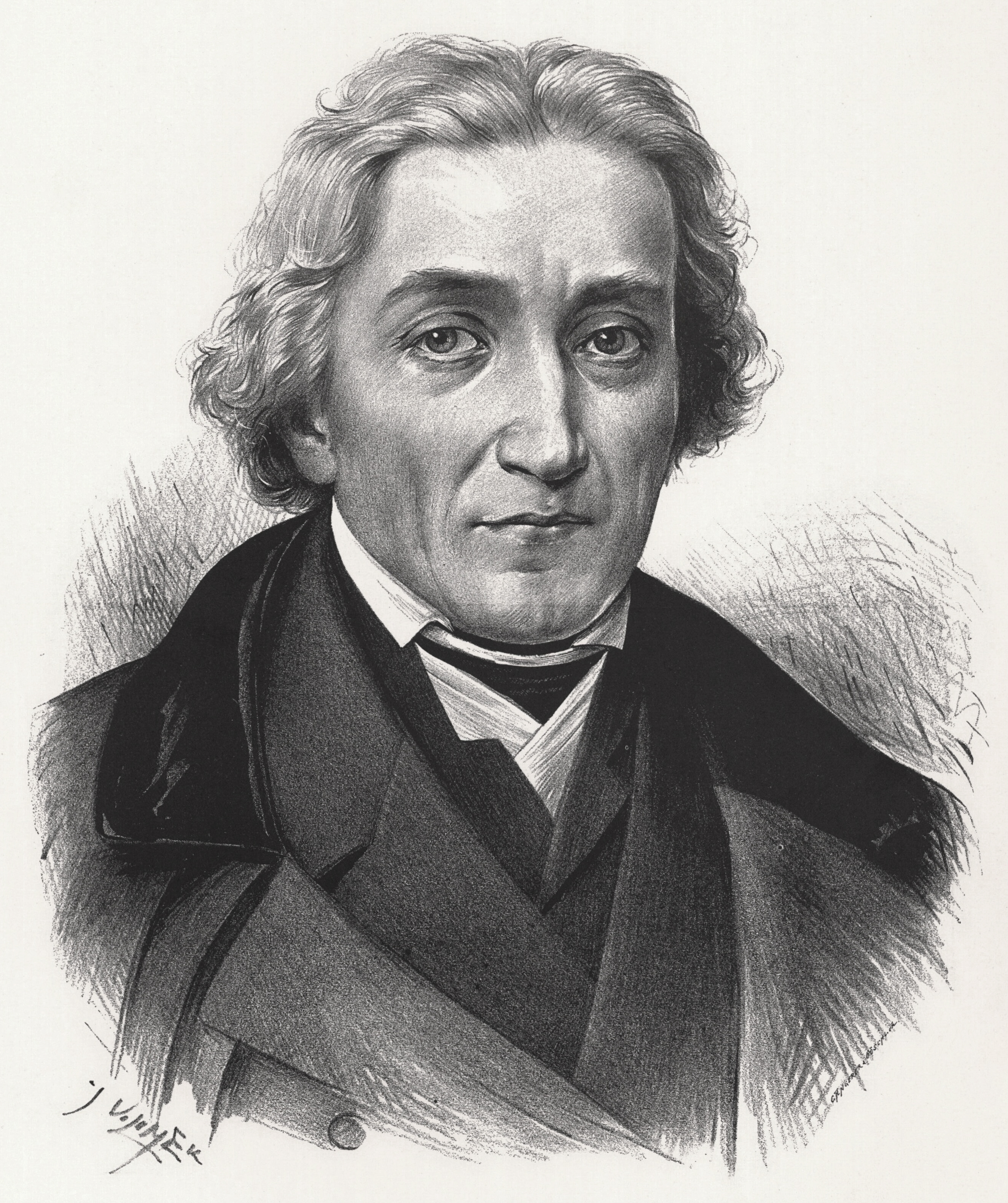
Josef Dobrovský and other figures of Czech National Revival, such as Josef Jungmann or František Palacký

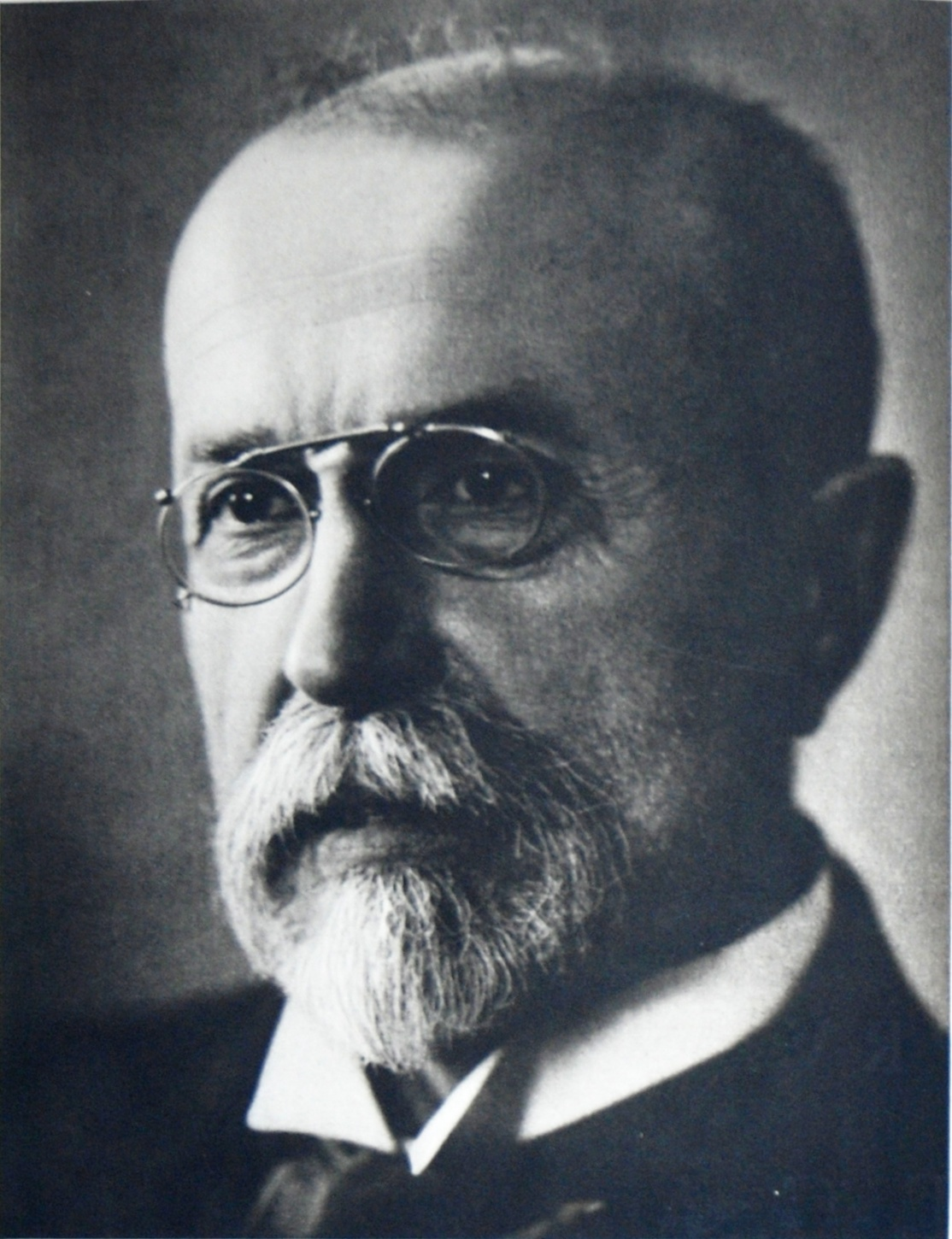
Tomáš Garrigue Masaryk, philosopher and the first Czechoslovak president

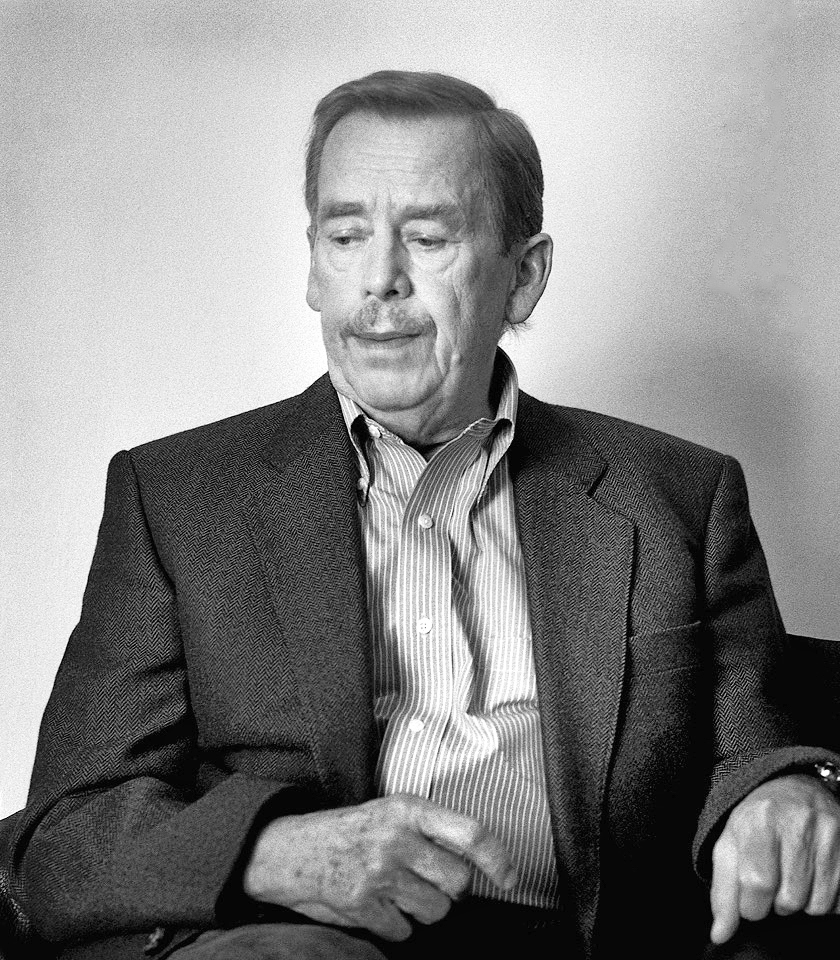
Václav Havel, dissident and the first Czech president and main figure of the Velvet Revolution

=== Food ===
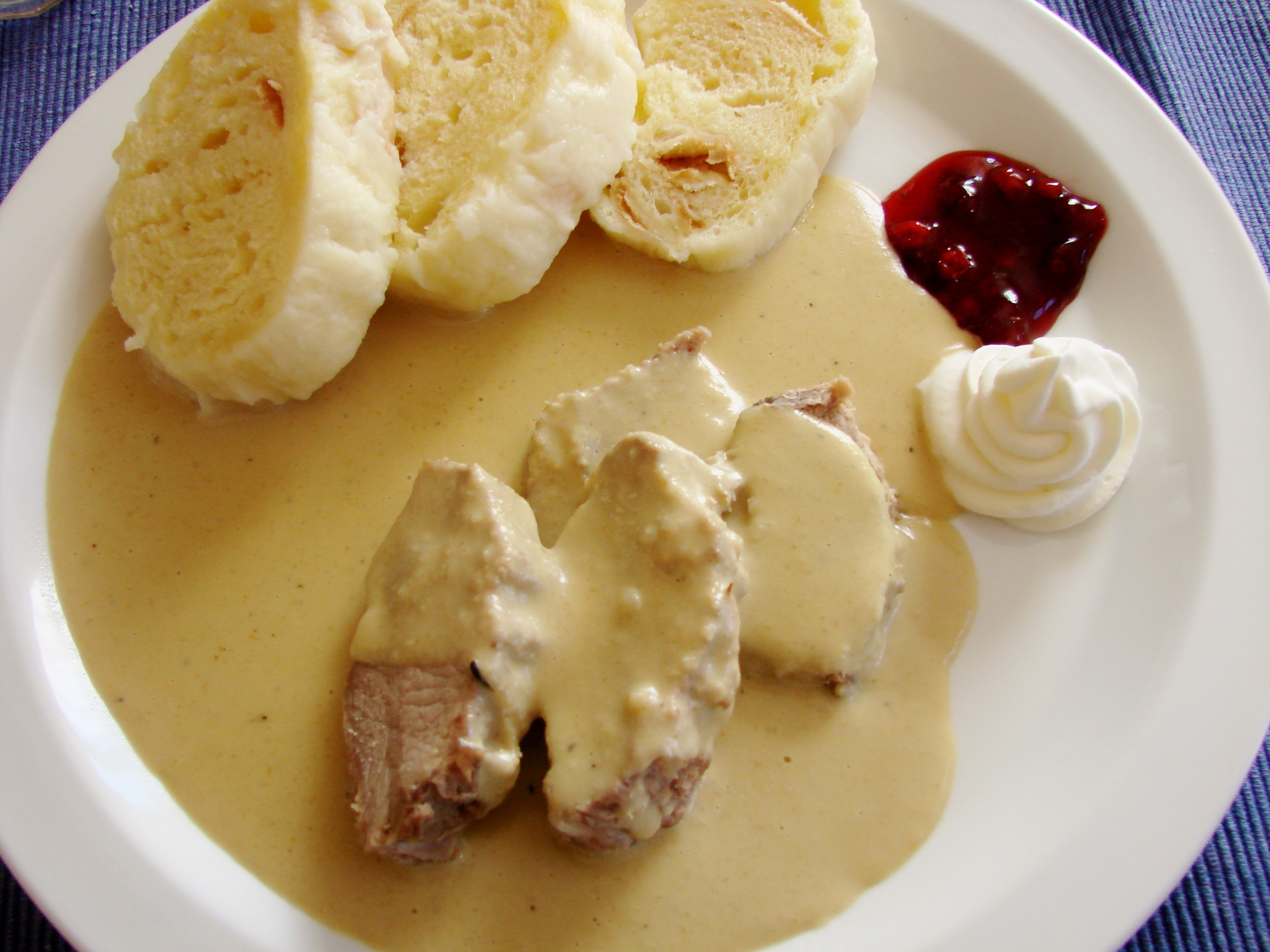
Svíčková na smetaně, popular Czech dish

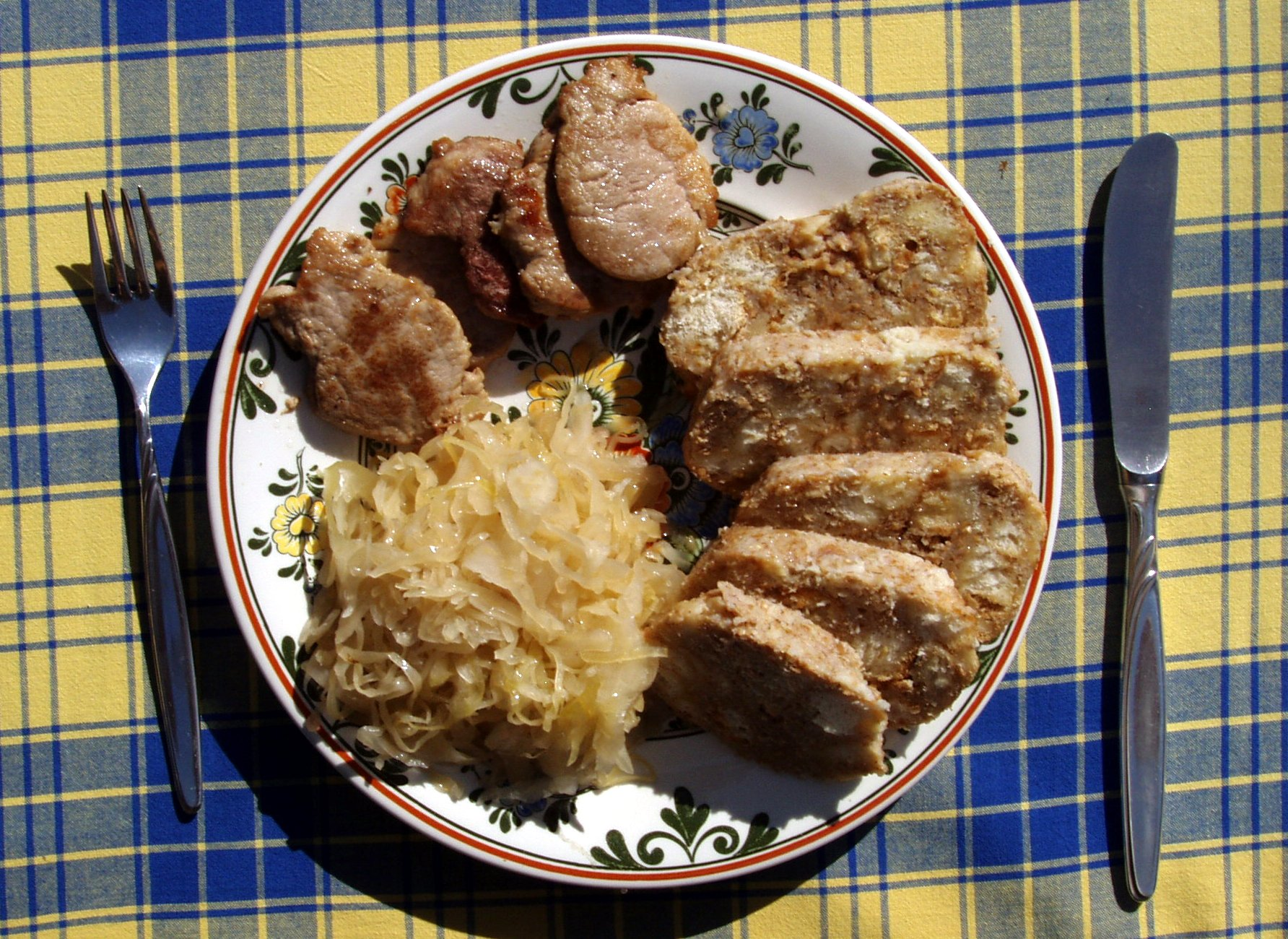
Vepřo knedlo zelo (pork roast with dumplings and sauerkraut), the Czech national dish

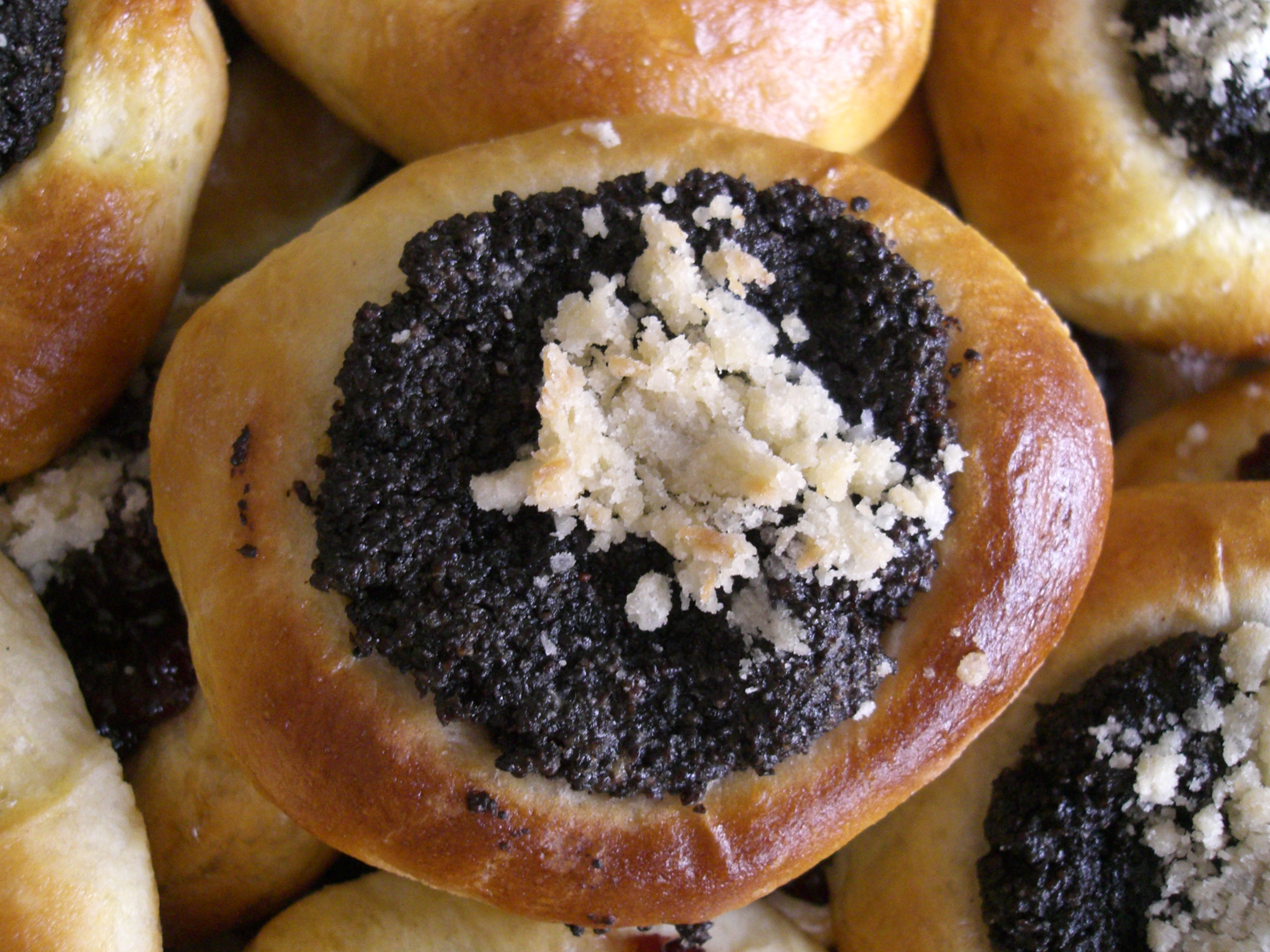
Koláč, famous Czech dessert

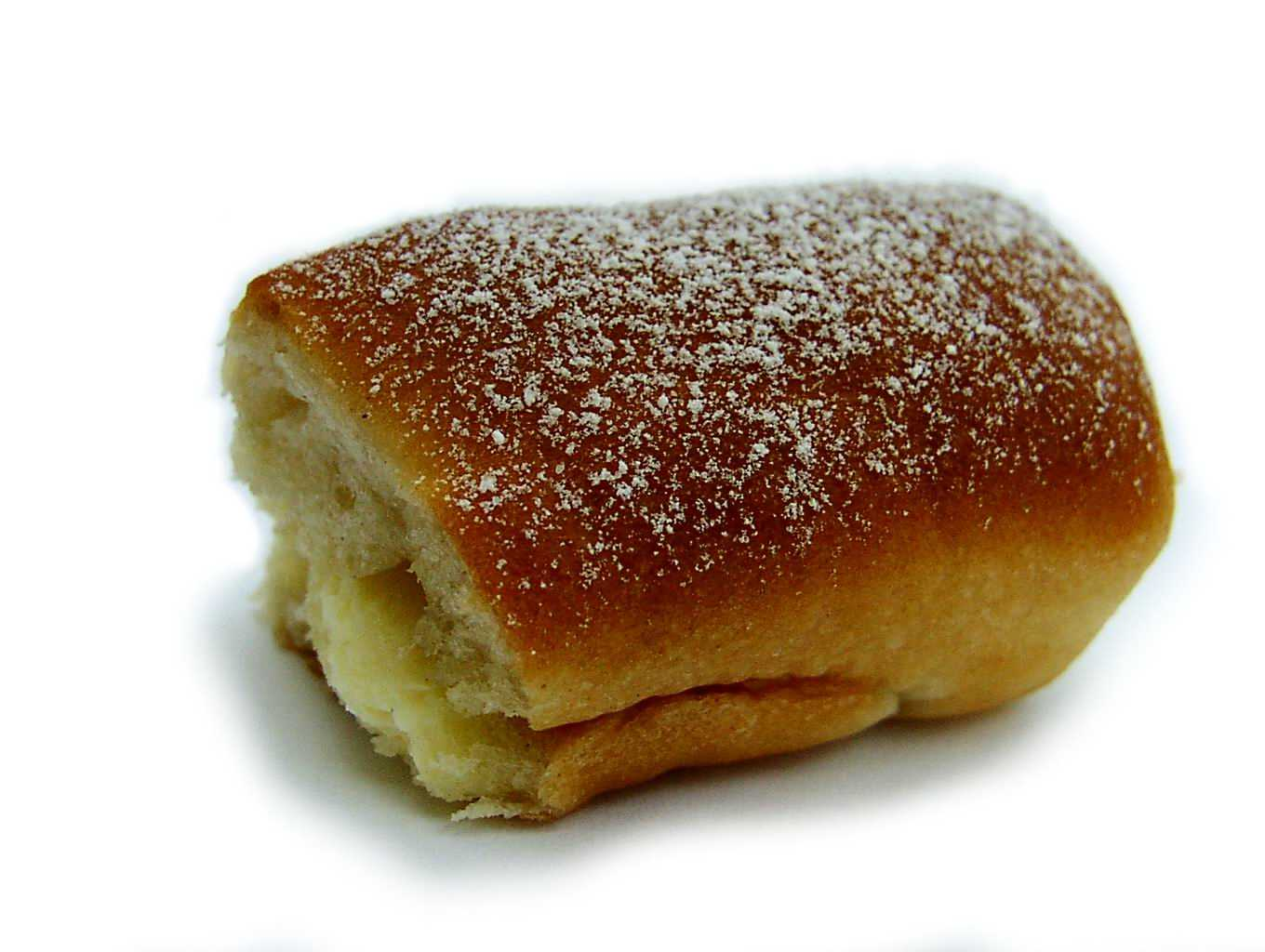
Buchta, popular Czech sweet pastry

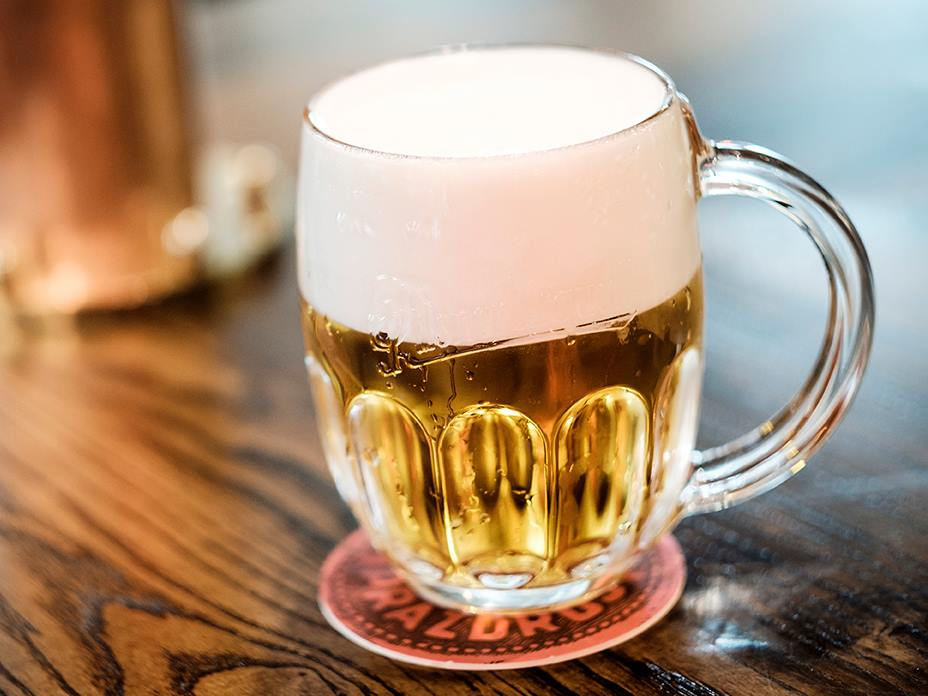
Czech beer

=== Flora ===
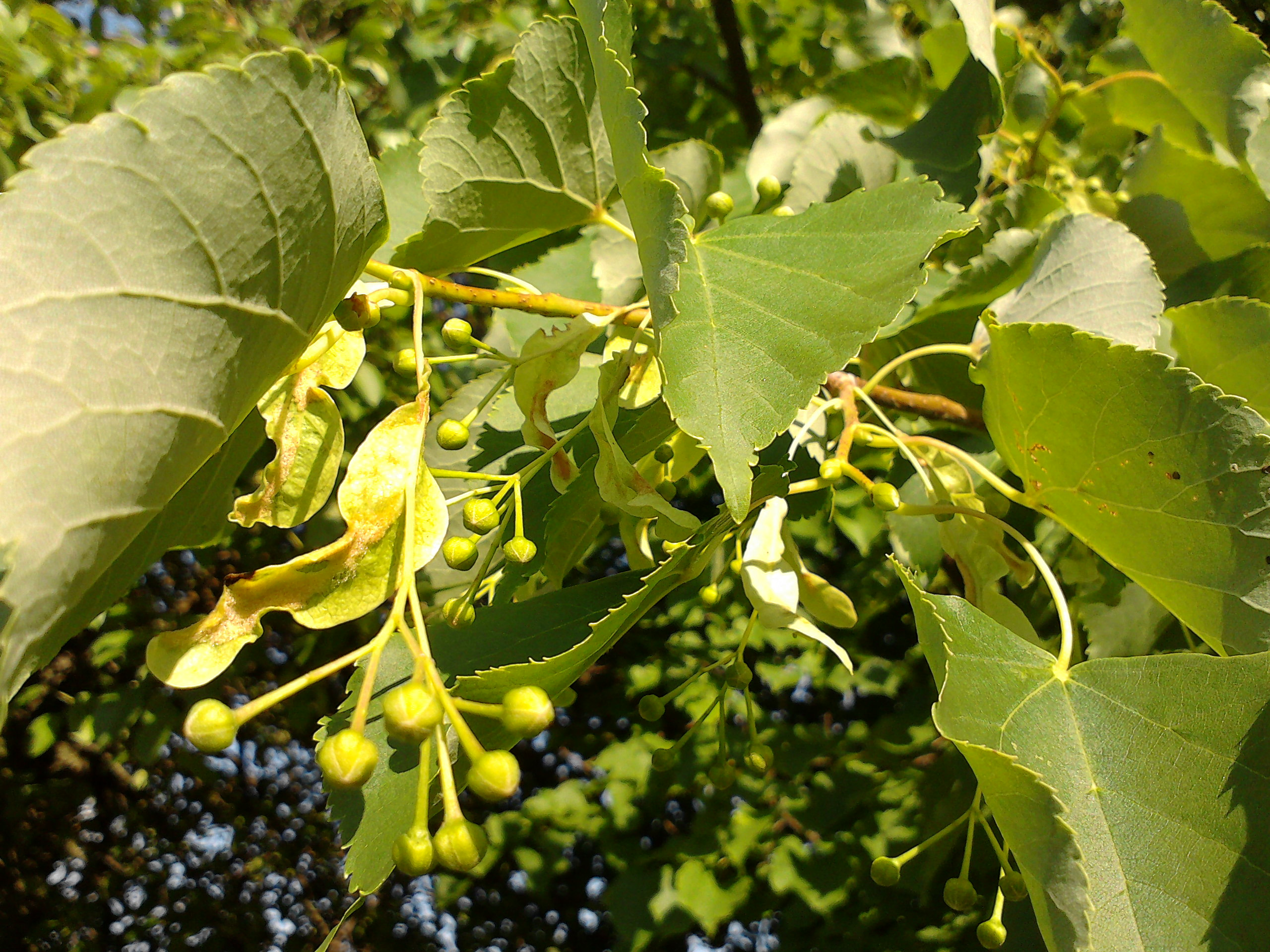
Linden leaves and tree

=== Arts and crafts ===
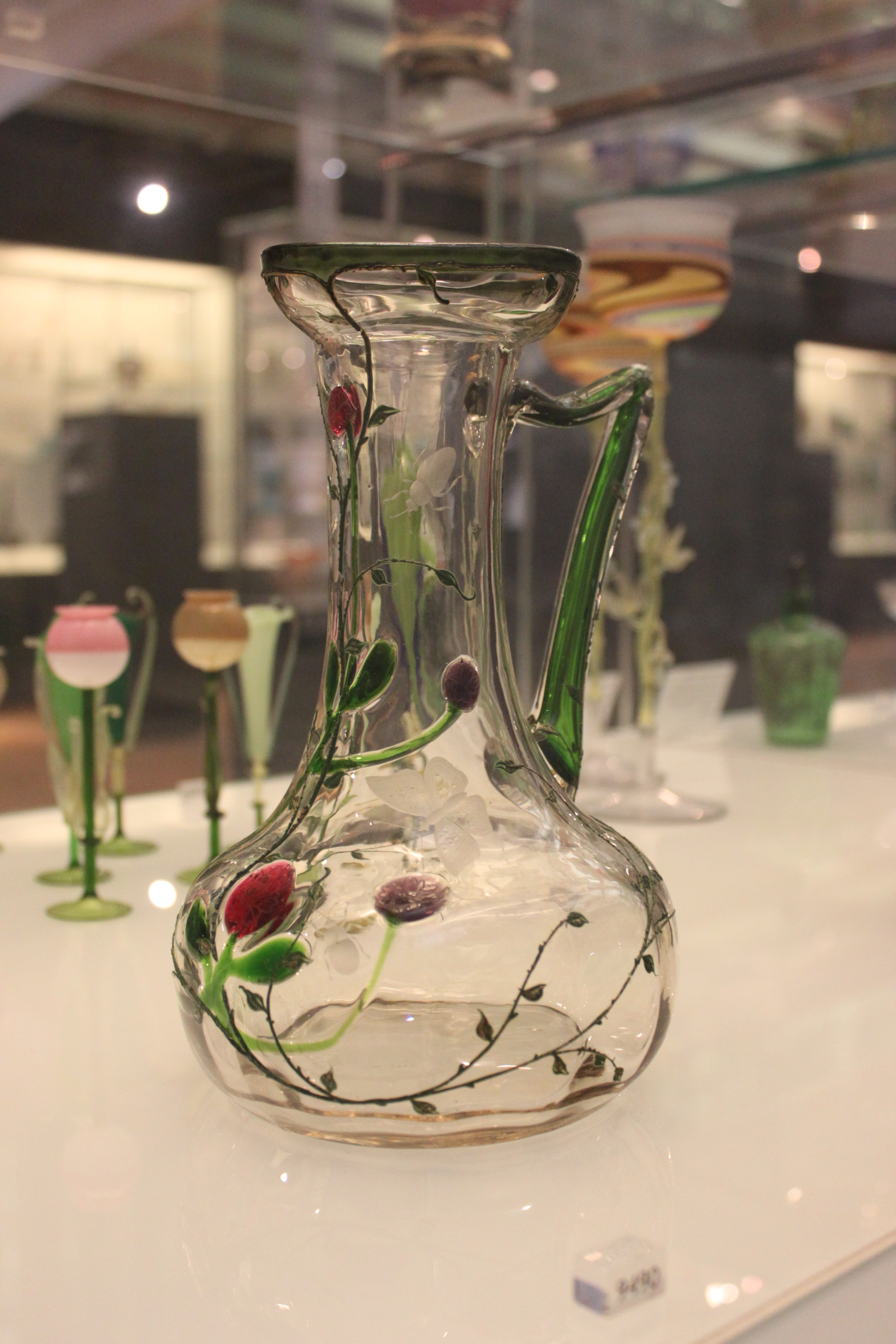
Bohemian glass and bohemian crystal

=== Folk costumes ===
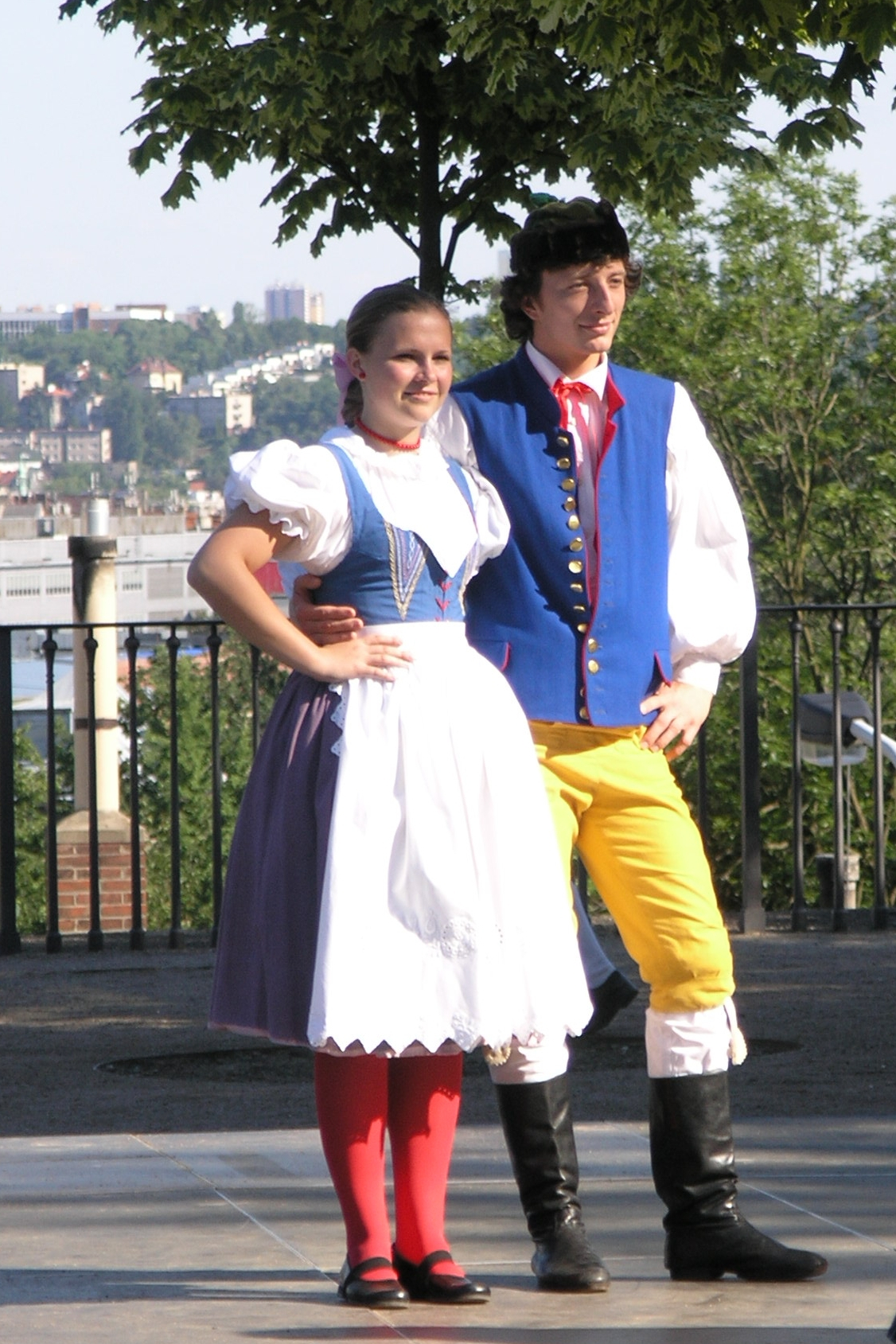
Kroj, national Czech costume, which has many regional variations

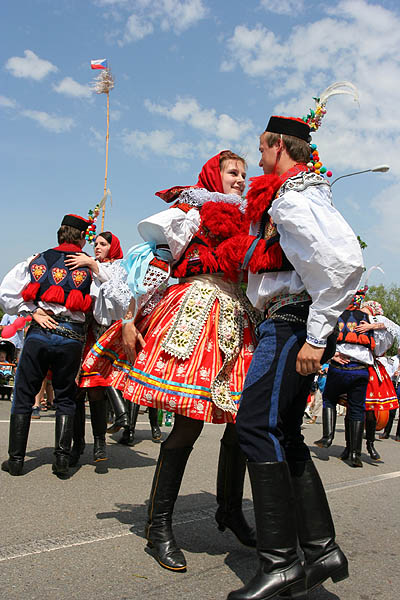
Another variation of kroj from Vlčnov, Moravian Slovakia

=== Dance and music ===
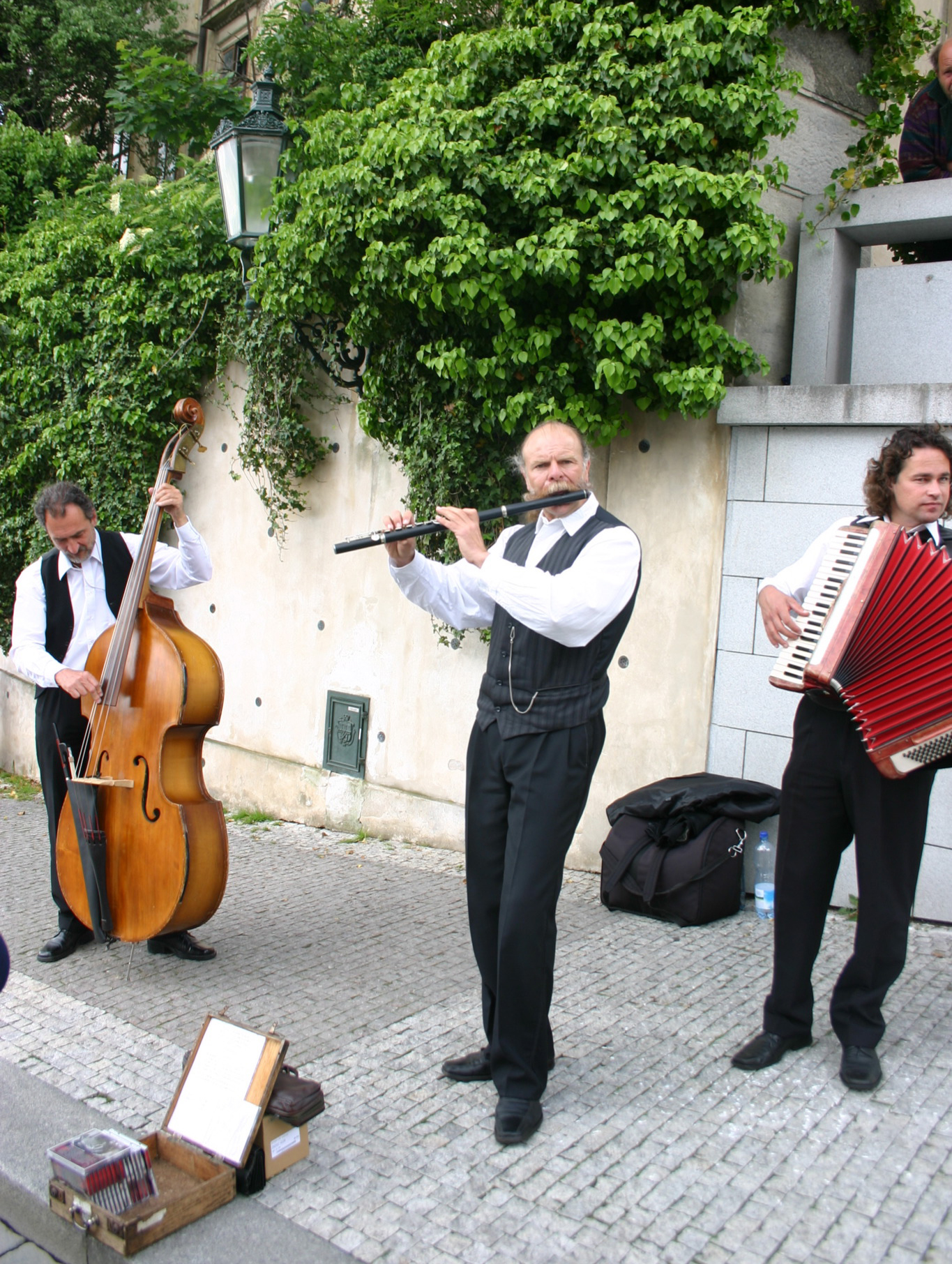
Polka, a dance and a genre of dance music which originated in Bohemia
