= List of Somaliland flags =

The following is a list of flags used in Somaliland.

== National flags ==
National flags
Flag	Date	Use	Description
	1996–present	National flag of Somaliland	A horizontal tricolour of green, white, and red with the Shahada inscribed in black on the green stripe, and a black five-pointed star in the center.

== Governmental flags ==
Governmental flags
Flag	Date	Use	Description
	?–present	Presidential standard of Somaliland	Same as the regular flag, except with a white monocolour version of the emblem of Somaliland in the canton.

== Police flags ==
Police flags
Flag	Date	Use	Description
	?–present	Flag of the Somaliland Police Force	A dark blue background with the emblem of the Somaliland Police Force in white.
	?–present	Flag of the Chief of the Somaliland Police Force	Same flag but with a golden fringe at its edges.

== Military flags ==
Police flags
Flag	Date	Use	Description
	?–present	Flag of the Somaliland Armed Forces	A red swallow-tail flag with an emblem of the Somaliland Armed Forces and the flag of Somaliland in the canton.
	?–present	Flag of the Somaliland National Army	Green field with an emblem of the army.
	?–present	Flag of the Chief of Staff of the Somaliland National Army	Green field with an emblem of the army and golden fringe at its edges.
	?–present	Flag of the Somaliland Coast Guard	Blue field with the Coast Guard emblem in the center.

== Historical flags ==
Historical flags
Flag	Date	Use	Description
	1903–1950	Flag of British Somaliland	Blue Ensign bearing the badge of British Somaliland, a kudu.
	1950–1952	Flag of British Somaliland	Blue Ensign bearing the badge of British Somaliland, a shield of multiple elements below a kudu head bearing the Tudor Crown.
	1952–1960	Flag of British Somaliland	Blue Ensign bearing the badge of British Somaliland, a shield of multiple elements below a kudu head bearing St Edward's Crown.
	1960–1991	Flag of Somalia	Light blue field with a white five-pointed star in the center. Used after union with Italian Somaliland.
	1991	Flag of Somalia (used in Somaliland)	Used locally before Somaliland adopted its own distinct flag.
	1991–1996	Flag of Somaliland (used in Somaliland)	White field with a green disc in the center, around which is written the Shahada in a non-calligraphic style.

== Proposed flags ==
Proposed flags
Flag	Date	Use	Description
	1991	Proposal 1	

== See also ==
- Flag of Somaliland
- Flag of Somalia
- British Somaliland
- History of Somaliland
- Politics of Somaliland
- Somaliland Armed Forces
