= Imperial standard =

The imperial standard is the flag used by an emperor and sometimes the members of his family. Today only Japan has a monarch with the imperial title.

- Imperial Standard of Austria (1806–1918)
- Imperial Standard of Byzantium (c. 1350)
- Flags of the Empire of China (1862–1912)
- Imperial Standard of Germany (1871–1918)
- Imperial Standard of the Holy Roman Empire (12th Century-1806)
- Imperial Standards of Iran (1926–1979)
- Imperial Standard of Japan
- Imperial Standard of the Ottoman Empire (Late 19th Century-1923)
- Imperial Standard of Russia (19th Century-1917)

== See also ==
- Imperial units – standards for weights and measures in the British Empire
- Presidential standard
- Royal standard
  - List of royal standards
