= Gallery of head of government standards =

This gallery of head of government standards shows the standards of heads of government of countries.

== A ==
Prime ministerial flag of Australia

== B ==
Prime ministerial flag of Bangladesh

Prime ministerial flag of Bahamas

Prime ministerial flag of Belize

== C ==
Prime ministerial standard of Cuba

== I ==
Prime ministerial standard of Israel

Prime ministerial standard of Italy

== J ==
Prime ministerial standard of Jamaica

== L ==
Prime minister's flag of Latvia

== M ==
Prime minister's standard of Moldova

== P ==
Prime minister's flag of Pakistan

Prime minister's flag of Portugal

== R ==
Prime minister's flag of Romania

== S ==
Prime minister's standard of Slovenia

Prime ministerial standard of Spain

== T ==
Prime minister's flag of Thailand

Prime minister's flag of Trinidad and Tobago

== See also ==
- Gallery of head of state standards
