= List of Yemenite flags =

Flag of the Republic of Yemen

The following is a list of flags used by Yemen throughout its history.

== National flag ==
Flag	Date	Use	Description	Reference(s)
	1990–Present	Flag of the Republic of Yemen	A horizontal triband of red, white and black	

== Presidential flag ==
Flag	Date	Use	Description	Reference(s)
	1990–Present	Presidential Flag of Yemen	A horizontal triband of red, white and black with the national emblem in the canton.	

== Regional flags (proposed, not official) ==
Flag	Date	Use	Description	Reference(s)
	1990–Present	Flag of Aden Region	A horizontal triband of blue, white and blue with a red trapezoid based on the hoist side.	
	1990–Present	Flag of Azal Region	A horizontal bicolor of green and white with the Yemenite tricolor in the white band.	
	1990–Present	Flag of Hadramaut Region	A horizontal triband of green, white and blue with a vertical red stripe on the hoist side and a tree in the center.	
	1990–Present	Flag of Janad Region	A horizontal triband of red, blue and yellow.	
	1990–Present	Flag of Saba Region	A horizontal triband of green (upper), white and green with six golden vertical bars in the center.	
	1990–Present	Flag of Tihama Region	A horizontal triband of light blue, white and green.	

== Military flags ==
Flag	Date	Use	Description	Reference(s)
	1990–Present	Flag of the Yemeni Interior Ministry	A blue field with The Ministry's Emblem in the center.	
	1964–Present	Flag of the Yemeni Republican Guard	A diagonal bicolor of orange and blue with the Republican Guard's emblem in the center.	
	1980–Present	Flag of the Yemeni Special Security Forces	A blue field with The Security Forces' emblem in the center.	
	1990–Present	Flag of the Yemeni Armed Forces	A horizontal triband of red, white and black with the Armed Forces' emblem in the canton corner.	
	1990–Present	Flag of the Yemeni Army	A red field with the national flag in the canton corner, and the Emblem of the Yemeni Armed Forces centered on the fly side.	
	1990–Present	Flag of the Yemeni Navy	A blue field with the national flag in the canton corner, and the emblem of the Yemeni Navy centered on the fly side.	
	1990–Present	Flag of the Yemeni Air Force	A sky blue field with the national flag in the canton corner, and the emblem of the Yemeni Air Force centered on the fly side.	

== Political flags ==
Flag	Date	Use	Description	Reference(s)
	1978–Present	Flag of the Yemeni Socialist Party	A light blue field with a red star in the center.	
	1982–Present	Flag of the General People's Congress	A blue field with a brown horse in the center.	
		Flag of the Yemeni Congregation for Reform (Islah) Party	A dark blue field with a white sun shining in the center.	
	1951–Present	Flag of the Ba'ath Party	A horizontal triband of black, white and green with a red triangle on the hoist side.	
	1994–Present	The Sarkha of the Houthis	A white field with a green border and a green and red Arabic script.	

== Historical flags ==
=== Kingdom of Yemen ===
Flag	Date	Use	Description	Reference(s)
	1918 - 1923	Flag of the Kingdom of Yemen	A simple red field	
	1923 - 1927	Flag of the Kingdom of Yemen	A red field with a white Shahadah	
	1927 - 1970	Flag of the Kingdom of Yemen	A red field with five stars and a sword in the center.	

=== Baidah Sultanate ===
Flag	Date	Use	Description	Reference(s)
	1636 - 1930	Flag of the Baidah Sultanate	A horizontal triband of white, red and black with a crescent moon in the canton.	

=== Sultanate of Lahej ===
Flag	Date	Use	Description	Reference(s)
	1728–1967	Flag of the Sultanate of Lahej	A vertical bicolor of red and white with 2 crossed Jambiyas and a spear on the red stripe.	

=== British Rule ===
Flag	Date	Use	Description	Reference(s)
Flags of The Federation of South Arabia				
	1937 - 1963	Flag of the Aden Colony	A Blue Ensign with the Union Jack at the canton, defaced with the badge of Aden.	
	1962 - 1967	Flag of the Federation of South Arabia	A horizontal triband of black, green and blue, separated by two golden stripes and a crescent moon with star in the center.	
	? - 1967	Flag of the Alawi Sheikhdom	A red field with white text	
	? - 1967	Flag of the Aqrabi Sheikhdom	A red field with white text	
	? - 1967	Flag of the Lower Aulaqi Sultanate		
	1963 - 1967	Flag of the State of Aden	A horizontal triband of blue (upper), white and blue; with a red trapezium based on the hoist side and a green star in the center.	
	1839 - 1967	Flag of the Emirate of Beihan	A horizontal triband of brown, green and yellow with a red triangle on the hoist side, which contains a crescent moon inside.	
	1839 - 1967	Flag of the Emirate of Dhala	A horizontal bicolor of red and green with a black crescent moon and star in the center.	
	1839 - 1967	Flag of the Fadhli Sultanate	A horizontal triband of black, green and blue with a crescent moon with star in the center.	
	1839 - 1967	Flag of Lower Yafa	A horizontal triband of black, white and green	
	1872 - 1967	Flag of the Sultanate of Lahej	A vertical bicolor of red and white with 2 crossed swords and a spear on the red stripe.	
	1839 - 1967	Flag of Wahidi Haban	A horizontal triband of green, yellow and blue with a red vertical stripe on the hoist side, which contains a crescent moon and star inside and 2 crossed swords in the center.	
	1839 - 1967	Flag of Dathina	A horizontal bicolor of blue and green with a crescent moon in the center and 3 stars.	
	1839 - 1967	Flag of Haushabi	A horizontal triband of green, yellow and blue with a red star in the center.	
Flags of The Protectorate of South Arabia				
	1839 - 1967	Flag of Kathiri	A horizontal triband of yellow (upper), green and yellow with a red triangle on the hoist side which contains 3 stars inside.	
	1880 - 1939	Flag of Qu'aiti	A red field with a white stripe on the hoist side.	
	1939 - 1967	Flag of Qu'aiti	A horizontal triband of red, yellow and blue with 2 blue discs and one green disc which contains 1 tower each disc.	
	1839 - 1967	Flag of the Mahra Sultanate	A horizontal triband of green, white and red with a black crescent moon and star in the center.	
	1839 - 1967	Flag of Wahidi Balhaf	A horizontal triband of green, yellow and blue with a red vertical stripe on the hoist side, which contains a crescent moon and star inside.	
	1839 - 1967	Flag of Upper Yafa	A horizontal bicolor of orange and green with a crescent moon and a sword in the center.	

=== Yemen Arab Republic ===
Flag	Date	Use	Description	Reference(s)
	1962 - 1990	Flag of the Yemen Arab Republic	A horizontal tricolour of red, white, and black with a green five-pointed star in the center.	

=== South Yemen ===
Flag	Date	Use	Description	Reference(s)
	1967–1990	Flag of South Yemen	A horizontal tricolour of red, white and black with a sky-blue triangle with a tilted red star (the emblem of the Yemeni Socialist Party) at the hoist.	
	1967–1990	Presidential flag of South Yemen	A horizontal tricolour of red, white and black with a sky-blue triangle with a tilted red star at the hoist and the coat of arms in the canton.	
	1978–1990	Flag of the ruling party		

== See also ==
- Flag of Yemen
- Emblem of Yemen

== Sources ==
- Mumford, Simon, ed. (2021-11-16). Complete Flags of the World: The Ultimate Pocket Guide (7th ed.). Dorling Kindersley. ISBN 978-0-241-52356-8.
- Znamierowski, Alfred (2020-09-20). The World Encyclopedia of Flags: An Illustrated Guide to International Flags, Banners, Standards and Ensigns. Anness. ISBN 978-0-7548-3480-9.
