= List of Emirati flags =

The following is a list of flags, banners and standards used in the United Arab Emirates

== National flag ==
Flag	Date	Use	Description
	1971–present	Flag of the United Arab Emirates	A horizontal tricolour of green, white and black with a vertical 1/4-width red bar at the hoist.

== Presidential flag ==
Flag	Date	Use	Description
	2008–present	Presidential Flag of the United Arab Emirates	A horizontal tricolour of green, white and black with a vertical 1/4-width red bar at the hoist with the emblem in the center.
	1973–2008	Presidential Flag of the United Arab Emirates	A horizontal tricolour of green, white and black with a vertical 1/4-width red bar at the hoist with the emblem in the center.

== Military flags ==
Flag	Date	Use	Description
	1971–present	Civil Ensign	A red field with the national flag on the canton.
	?–present	Flag of The United Arab Emirates Armed Forces	A red field with the national flag on the canton defaced with The Armed Forces Emblem.
	?–present	Flag of The United Arab Emirates Army	A red field with the army's emblem in the center.
	?–present	Flag of The United Arab Emirates Air Force	A blue field with the air force's emblem in the center.
	?–present	Flag of The United Arab Emirates Navy	A white field with the navy's emblem in the center.

== Emirate flags ==
Flag	Date	Use	Description
	1820–present	Flag of Abu Dhabi	A red field with a white rectangle at the canton.
	1820–present	Flag of Ajman	A red field with a white bar at the hoist.
	1820–present	Flag of Dubai	A red field with a white bar at the hoist.
	1952–1961	Flag of Fujairah	A red field with a white Arabic calligraphy written الفجيرة in the center.
	1820–present	Flag of Ras Al Khaimah	A large red rectangle on a white field.
	1820–present	Flag of Sharjah	A large red rectangle on a white field.
	1820–present	Flag of Umm Al Quwain	A red field with a white bar at the hoist and a large white star and crescent in the center.

== Historical flags ==
=== Under Persian Rule ===
Flag	Date	Use	Description
Pre-Islamic Persia
	559–529 BC	Standard of the Achaemenid Empire	Also called Derafsh Sahbaz, it was the Standard of Cyrus the Great, founder of the Achaemenid Empire.
	225–651	Flag of the Sasanian Empire	Called Derafsh Kaviani, It's the mythological and historical flag of Iran until the end of the Sassanid dynasty, which according to Ferdowsi's narration in the Shahnameh, This flag emerged with the uprising of Kaveh the Blacksmith against the tyrannical king Zahak and the beginning of the Fereydon's kingdom and Pishdadian dynasty.
Islamic Persia
	945–1055	Banner of the Buyid dynasty	4 green sulde suspended on a staff.

=== Under Arab Rule ===
Flag	Date	Use	Description
Caliphates
	651–661	Flag of the Rashidun Caliphate	A simple black field.
	750–934	Flag of the Abbasid Caliphate	A simple black field.
	661–750	Flag of The Umayyad Caliphate	A simple white field.
Emirates
	1417–1520	Flag of The Jabrids Emirate	A red field with a white symbol in the center and a white Arabic script upwards.
	1727–1818	Flag of the Emirate of Diriyah	A green field with a white stripe on the fly and an Arabic script written in white in the center.
	1822–1891	Flag of the Emirate of Nejd	A green field with a white stripe on the fly and an Arabic script written in white in the center.

=== Under Portuguese Rule ===
Flag	Date	Use	Description
Kingdom of Portugal
	1508–1521	Flag of The Kingdom of Portugal	White field with the royal coat of arms in the middle.
	1521–1578	Flag of The Kingdom of Portugal	White field with the royal coat of arms in the middle.
	1578–1640	Flag of The Kingdom of Portugal	White field with the royal coat of arms in the middle.
	1616–1640	Flag of The Kingdom of Portugal (Putative)	White field with the royal coat of arms in the middle.
	1640–1650	Flag of The Kingdom of Portugal	White field with the royal coat of arms in the middle.
Iberian Union
	1580–1640	Flag of The Iberian Union	A red saltire resembling two crossed, roughly-pruned (knotted) branches, on a white field.
	1580–1640	Banner of Arms of The Iberian Union	The heraldry of the House of Austria (with the arms of Portugal).
	1580–1640	Royal Flag of The Iberian Union	A red field with the royal arms in the center.

=== Under Omani Rule ===
Flag	Date	Use	Description
	1650–1783	Flag of the Imamate of Oman	A white field with the royal emblem in the canton.
	1696–1783	Flag of the Omani Empire	A white field with red Arabic script above and a red sword pointed to the right.

=== Pirate Coast ===
Flag	Date	Use	Description
	1783–1820	Flag of the Hinawi (the Bani Yas – Abu Dhabi and Dubai) tribal confederation	A simple red field.
	1783–1820	Flag of the Ghafiri (Umm Al Quwain and Ajman) tribal confederation	A simple red field.
	1783–1820	Original flag of Al Qawasim (Sharjah and Ras Al Khaimah)	A horizontal tricolor of green, white and red with a black Arabic calligraphy in the center.

=== Under British Rule ===
Flag	Date	Use	Description
	1820–1971	Flag of the United Kingdom	A superimposition of the flags of England and Scotland with the Saint Patrick's Saltire (representing Ireland).
	1880–1947	Flag of British India	A Red Ensign with the Union Jack at the canton, defaced with the Star of India emblem displayed in the fly.
	1968–1971	Flag of the Trucial States Council	A horizontal tricolour of red, white and red with a green 7-pointed star in the center.

== See also ==
- Flag of the United Arab Emirates
- Emblem of the United Arab Emirates
