= Flag of Somaliland =

Republic of Somaliland
- Use: National flag
- Proportion: 1:2
- Adopted: October 15, 1996; 30 years ago
- Design: A horizontal tricolor of green, white, and red with the Shahada on the green stripe and a black five-pointed star charged on the white stripe.
- Use: Presidential standard
- Proportion: 1:2
- Design: Same as the regular flag, except with a white monochrome version of the emblem of Somaliland in the canton.

The flag of Somaliland (Somali: Calanka Soomaaliland; Arabic: علم صوماليلاند) was adopted on 15 October 1996. It consists of a tricolor of green, white, and red, with a black star located in the center. On the green stripe, there is the Shahada in white calligraphic script.

The Constitution of Somaliland, as approved on 31 May 2001 by referendum, states at Article 7 that "the flag of the Republic of Somaliland shall consist of three horizontal, parallel, and equal sections: the top section, which is colored green and has inscribed in its midst in white in the Arabic language La Ilaha Ill-Allah, Muhammadan Rasulullah (Arabic: لا إله إلاَّ الله محمد رسول الله, 'There is no god except for Allah, and Muhammad is the messenger of Allah'); the middle section is white and has at its center a black star; and the bottom section is colored red."

The flag of Somaliland consists of three horizontal, parallel bands—green, white, and red—each carrying deep symbolic meaning that reflects the identity and aspirations of its people. According to the Constitution of Somaliland, approved by referendum on 31 May 2001, Article 7 specifies that the top green section bears the Islamic declaration of faith (the Shahadah) in Arabic, affirming the central role of Islam in Somaliland’s cultural and religious life. The middle white section, which features a black star at its center, represents peace and purity, as well as unity among the people. The bottom red section symbolizes the struggle and sacrifices made in the pursuit of independence and self-determination. Together, these elements form a flag that not only adheres to constitutional definition but also conveys a powerful message of faith, resilience, unity, and hope for a stable and peaceful future.

== Protocol ==
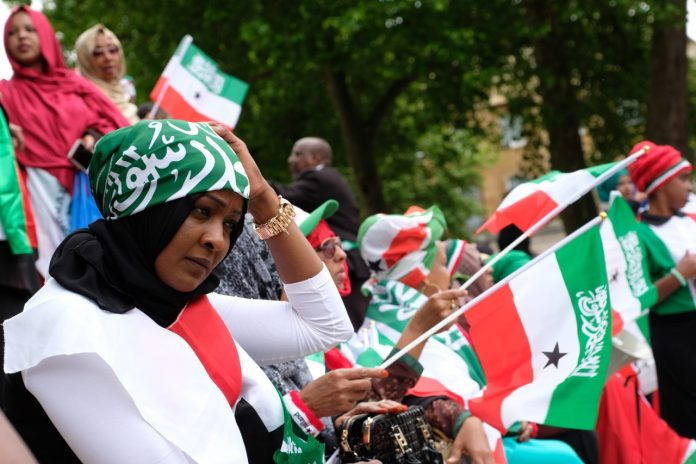
Somalilander women at an independence day celebration wearing the flag of Somaliland

Due to the importance of the Shahada in Islam, regulations have been made on the usage of the flag. It is forbidden for Somalis to fly the flag at half mast because it has the Shahada (which reads in Arabic, "There is no other god except God; Muhammad is the Messenger of God") written on it, and it is seen as desecration. Moreover, if a person is seen lowering the flag to half-mast, they might be charged with flag desecration. Similar rules, for the same reason, also apply to the flags of Afghanistan, Saudi Arabia, and Iraq.

== Alternative flags ==
Some Somaliland flags use unofficial orange instead of the official red

Somaliland flag without the shahada

Although the aforementioned Article 7 clearly states that the bottom of the flag is red, some little versions have been seen with a clear orange color instead. Another variation is the orientation of the star, as many Somaliland flags have the star pointing the opposite direction from other flags.

Most Somaliland flags are of the ratio 1:2. It is based on the official ratio of the Union Flag of the United Kingdom, the former colonial power. Pictures of flags on the internet and elsewhere often erroneously show a shorter flag (of ratio 2:3).

== Historical flags ==
=== British Somaliland ===
==== 1903–1950 ====
When the British annexed and occupied Somaliland in 1903, they established a protectorate and made it part of the British Empire. The British adopted a new flag for the region (officially named British Somaliland). Like many Commonwealth countries, the flag had a defaced Blue Ensign: a blue field with the Union Flag in the upper hoist quarter of the flag. There was an image of a Kudu (an antelope native to the British Somaliland area) on a white disc. The flag was flown on ships owned by residents of British Somaliland or on government buildings in the territory.

==== 1950–1960 ====
In 1950, the protectorate of British Somaliland's badge and flag changed and thus all flags which bore it. The flag still had the Union Flag on the quarter-hoist. The kudu's head and shoulders were retained and taken off to form the most dominant feature on the new arms, although the antelope's face was now looking straight out at the observer. Between its horns, the Royal crown was inserted to symbolize the Royal family and the British Empire in general.

The badge was changed as well; it consisted of an escutcheon divided vertically into green and blue colours, having a chief with a golden Somali shield in front of two spears in saltire, heads downwards, in natural colours. The green portion contained an image of a white minaret. Moreover, on the blue quarter, an Arabian dhow in full sail on waves of the sea, with a golden anchor in the base. The kudu's head was facing forward to the observer instead of facing left on the earlier version. Above, the kudu was the Royal Crown between the horns. Underneath, there was a wreath coloured in green and yellow which formed the crest.

When British Somaliland was granted independence on 26 June 1960 the flag ceased being used.

=== State of Somaliland ===
British Somaliland was granted independence as the State of Somaliland on 26 June 1960. The State of Somaliland adopted a flag similar to that used in the Italian-administered Trust Territory of Somaliland, i.e. a blue flag charged with a white five-pointed star, as its national flag. The State of Somaliland would merge into the newly established Somali Republic on 1 July 1960.

=== Gallery of historical flags ===
The following are the flags historically used in the territory of present-day Somaliland:

Banners of the Adal Sultanate (1415–1577)

Religious flag of the Isaaq Sultanate derived from an Adal Sultanate flag (1700s–1884)

Flag of British Somaliland (1884–1903)

Flag of British Somaliland (1903–1950)

Flag of British Somaliland (1950–1952)

Flag of British Somaliland (1952–1960)

Flag of the State of Somaliland (26 June 1960 – 1 July 1960)

Flag of the Somali Republic (1 July 1960 – 1991)

Flag of the Somali National Movement (1981–1991)

(18 May 1991 – 14 October 1996)

14 October 1996 – present

== See also ==
- Emblem of Somaliland
- List of Somaliland flags
