= Flag of the Russian Empire =

Flag of the Russian Empire could mean either:

- Black-yellow-white flag of the Russian Empire (1858–1896)
- White-blue-red flag of the Russian Empire (1896–1917)
