= Czechoslovak Ocean Shipping =

- Flag of Czechoslovak Ocean Shipping
- Industry: International shipping
- Founded: 1959
- Defunct: 1998
- Fate: Dissolved
- Headquarters: Prague

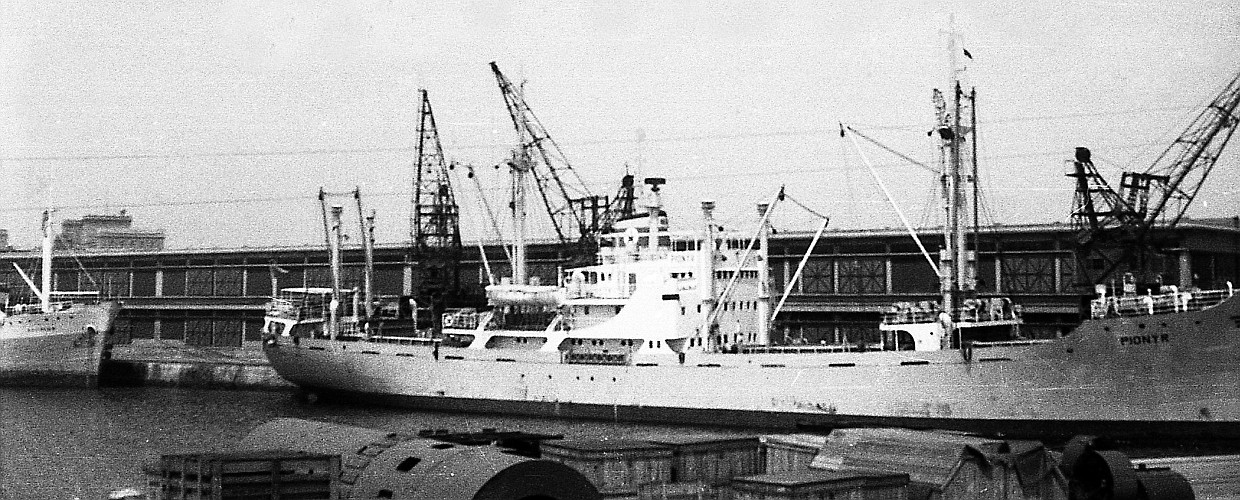
MS Pionýr in harbor of Constanţa, Romania (1961)

Czechoslovak Ocean Shipping (Czech: Československá námořní plavba) was a Czechoslovak shipping company founded in 1959. Privatised in 1992 and renamed Czech Ocean Shipping in 1994, it ceased shipping operations in 1998.

== History ==
=== Background ===
Seagoing ships sailed under the Czechoslovak flag shortly after the founding of Czechoslovakia. The first such ship was the schooner Kehrwieder in 1920. The Treaty of Versailles made it possible to use national flags of landlocked countries on seagoing ships; Czechoslovakia ratified this treaty in 1924. Prague became the port of registry, and through treaties Czechoslovakia leased areas in the ports of Stettin (now Szczecin in Poland) and Hamburg (the area of Moldauhafen) for 99 years.

During the First Czechoslovak Republic, Czechoslovak seagoing ships belonged to various companies, for example, the ship Legie in 1920 was owned by Legiobanka; other ships were owned by the Bata Corporation, or by foreign companies. In the inter-war period 80 future officers graduated from a naval academy in Yugoslavia, so after World War II, Czechoslovakia had a number of experienced sea captains.

=== Creation ===
On 18 September 1953 the joint-stock company for maritime transport Čechofracht was founded. Shortly afterwards, it became a state-owned company. In February 1959, the Ministry of Foreign Trade granted Čechofracht the right to establish an international joint-stock company, responsible for operating, purchasing, selling and renting ships. The new company, Czechoslovak Ocean Shipping, was formally established on 1 April 1959 by registration in the Company Register, and on 4 June 1959 the Minister of Foreign Trade authorized the new company to operate maritime shipping.

Because the People's Republic of China was subjected to an international trade embargo over its involvement in the Korean War, it was unable to operate its own maritime transport. As part of an agreement China participated in the establishment of the Czechoslovak Ocean Shipping company financially and in the construction of a number of ships for its fleet. These ships were then providing transport services for Chinese needs.

=== Continued operation ===
Because Czechoslovakia was a landlocked country, ships were built by shipyards in coastal states — for example, Poland, Yugoslavia, Bulgaria and Japan. All seagoing ships were subjected to approval by foreign classification organizations (e.g. Lloyd's Register), which by their requirements affected the construction of the ships.

During the years of its existence, the company owned 44 seagoing ships, the largest of which was the 13,339 GRT tanker Ostrava, measuring 560 feet 0 inches (170.7 m) long and 71 feet 10 inches (21.9 m) beam, with a maximum speed of 15.5 knots.

The operation of the ships was very profitable. Czechoslovak ships exchanged goods, among others, with China and Cuba, ie with states that at that time were partially blockaded for political reasons. They made it possible to get the products of Czechoslovak industry all over the world and to import scarce raw materials without much need for foreign exchange.

Some ships were built by Czechoslovakia as consideration, such as the ship Kladno built from the proceeds of an anthracite mine in Vietnam, or the modern ship Vítkovice as consideration for an iron ore mine in Ethiopia.

In 1984, Czechoslovakia had 14 seagoing ships: Košice, Vítkovice, Blaník, Sitno, Radhošť, Kriváň, Praha, Mír, Bratislava, Třinec, Orlík, Slapy, Lipno and Ostrava.

=== After 1990 ===
In 1992, Czechoslovak Ocean Shipping was privatized in the first wave of coupon privatization. The owners were FINOP, Čechofracht, about 50 investment privatization funds (the largest of which were PIAS, KIS, YSE and SIS), a restitution fund and about 20,000 holders of investment coupons and employee shares. Czechoslovak Ocean Shipping ordered two Panamax ships (Beskydy and Šumava) from the Daewoo shipyard of South Korea, and invested in ownership interests in several service, trade or shipping subsidiaries, some of which were designed to operate individual ships.

On 15 June 1994, in connection with the Dissolution of Czechoslovakia, the company's articles of association were changed, and the name of the company was changed to Czech Ocean Shipping.

In 1995, Michael D. Dingman and Viktor Kožený became the majority shareholders, and the restructuring and modernization of the fleet continued. Ships were gradually sold, some to the subsidiaries that operated them, some to other buyers (for example, in 1995, three ships were sold to the Slovak company Dunajplavba). The company subsequently went into a deep loss, and by 1998 its remaining ships were sold at very low prices.

In recent years, Czech Ocean Shipping has focused mainly on investment activities and the management and rental of real estate.

Czech and Slovak sailors continue to operate in the field, but mostly under the auspices of other companies. On four of the ships of the German shipping company MST, some crews were composed entirely of Czechs and Slovaks. Ethnically mixed crews were also on the ships of some Italian shipowners — Czech or Slovak representation on about 15 ships (especially in the officer corps), while the subordinate crew often comes from other countries, such as Ukraine. Czech and Slovak officers were also employed by some of the buyers of former Czechoslovak Ocean Shipping ships.

== Fleet ==
Year	Name
1959	Republika I.
1959	Julius Fučík
1959	Lidice
1959	Mír I.
1959	Dukla
1959	Ostrava
1959	Orava I.
1959	Kladno
1960	Orlík I.
1960	Pionýr
1961	Slapy I.
1961	Odra
1961	Labe I.
1963	Jiskra
