= Flag of Bohemia =

Historic flag

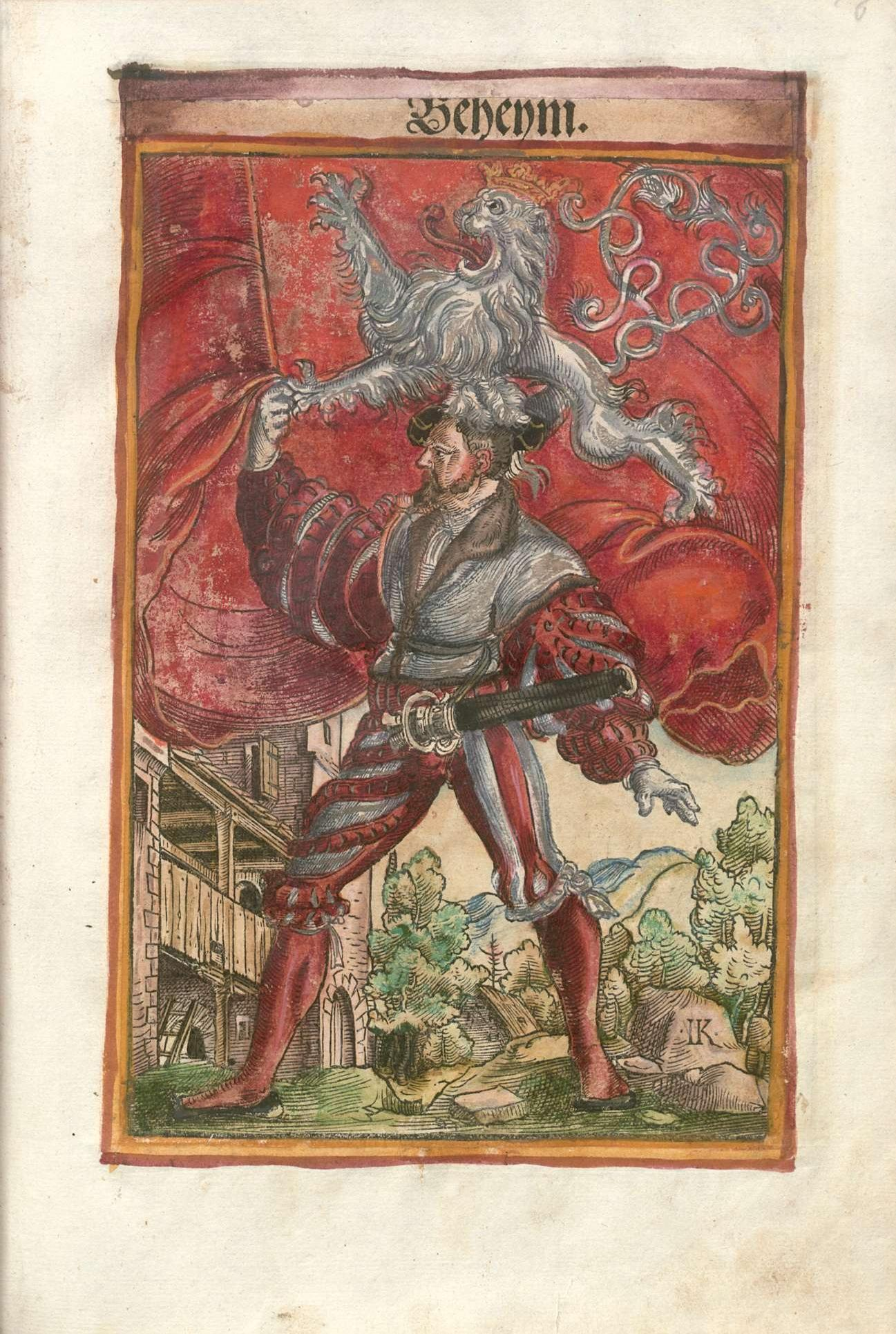
Historical Bohemian flag in the work of Jacob Koebel: Wapen. Des heyligen Römischen Reichs Teutscher nation (1545)

The flag of Bohemia is a historic flag, which now forms part of the design in the modern flag of the Czech Republic. The flag, a horizontal bicolour, was based on the colours of the former monarchs of Bohemia. The heraldic flag of Bohemia (the flag of Bohemia in the form of the flag with coat of arms) is described and drawn for example in the work of Jacob Koebel: Wapen des heyligen römischen Reichs teutscher Nation from 1545. The even older description of this flag (13th century) can be read in the chronicle of Ottokar aus der Gaal (Otacher ouz der Geul, Ottokar von Steiermark) (* about 1265; † between 1318 and 1322): Die Steirische Reimchronik.

Hern Dietrich Spatzmanen
sach man die banier leiten:
in einem rȏten samît breiten
was gewohrt ein lewe wîz.
ouch heten ir baniere flîz,
die von Merhaeren wârn:
ein geschâchzabelten arn
von rȏter und von wîzer varbe
sach man ob in begarbe
waejen von dem winde.

== History and use ==
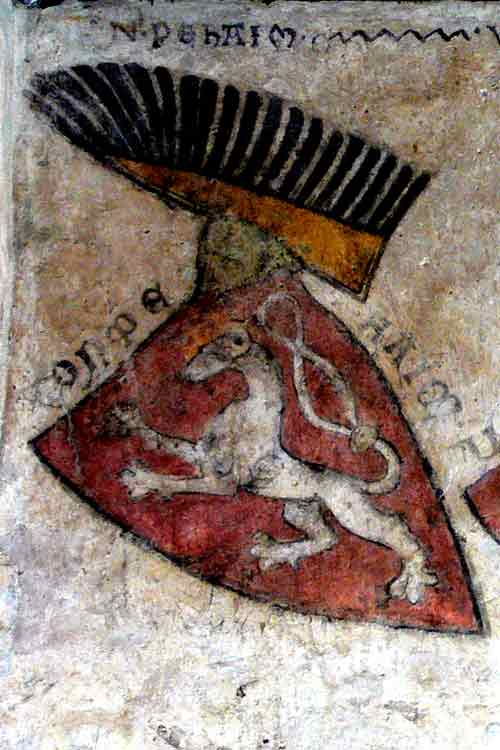
The oldest depiction of coat of arms of Bohemia in Gozzoburg Castle in Krems

"The colors of the flag, white and red, were derived from the coat of arms of the King of Bohemia (silver lion on a red field) which was granted to the king Vladislaus I in the 12th century. This quickly became the coat of arm of the whole kingdom."

The oldest surviving full colour depiction of the arms of Bohemia is represented by the fresco in the hall of the castle of Gozzoburg in Krems an der Donau, that comes from the early 1270s. A further depiction can be found in the manuscript of abbes Kunigunde from the 1310s.

The bicolor white-red banners were therefore carried into battle by the armies of the Bohemian kings and in the 19th century the colors were adopted by the Czech national movement. But when the goals of the movement were fulfilled in 1918 by the restoration of the independent Czech state, the need for the significant symbols, including a flag which was not identical to that of neighbouring Poland, led to the approval of the new flag of Czechoslovakia in 1920. This new flag still included the white and red horizontal stripes from the flag of Bohemia.

In 1990, the Bohemian flag was adopted as the official flag of the Czech Republic, then part of the Czech and Slovak Federative Republic (ČSFR, 1990–1992). The flag was adopted in reaction to the adoption of separate Slovak symbols. However, the Czech flag was used much less than the wider flag of Czechoslovakia, whereas the flag of Slovakia (then without coat of arms and thus identical to flag of the World War II Slovak Republic) was widely used in Slovakia. This difference mirrored prevailing separatist tendencies in the Slovak Republic and federalist tendencies in the Czech Republic. Another problem, again, was the Bohemian flag's similarity to the flag of neighbouring Poland, because the only difference was the proportion 2:3 (Polish flag is 5:8). For these reasons, Czech politicians decided to preserve the flag of Czechoslovakia as the symbol of the state with which most of Czech society was identified.

Since 1993, the flag of Bohemia has had no legal status and is only rarely seen today in the Czech Republic.

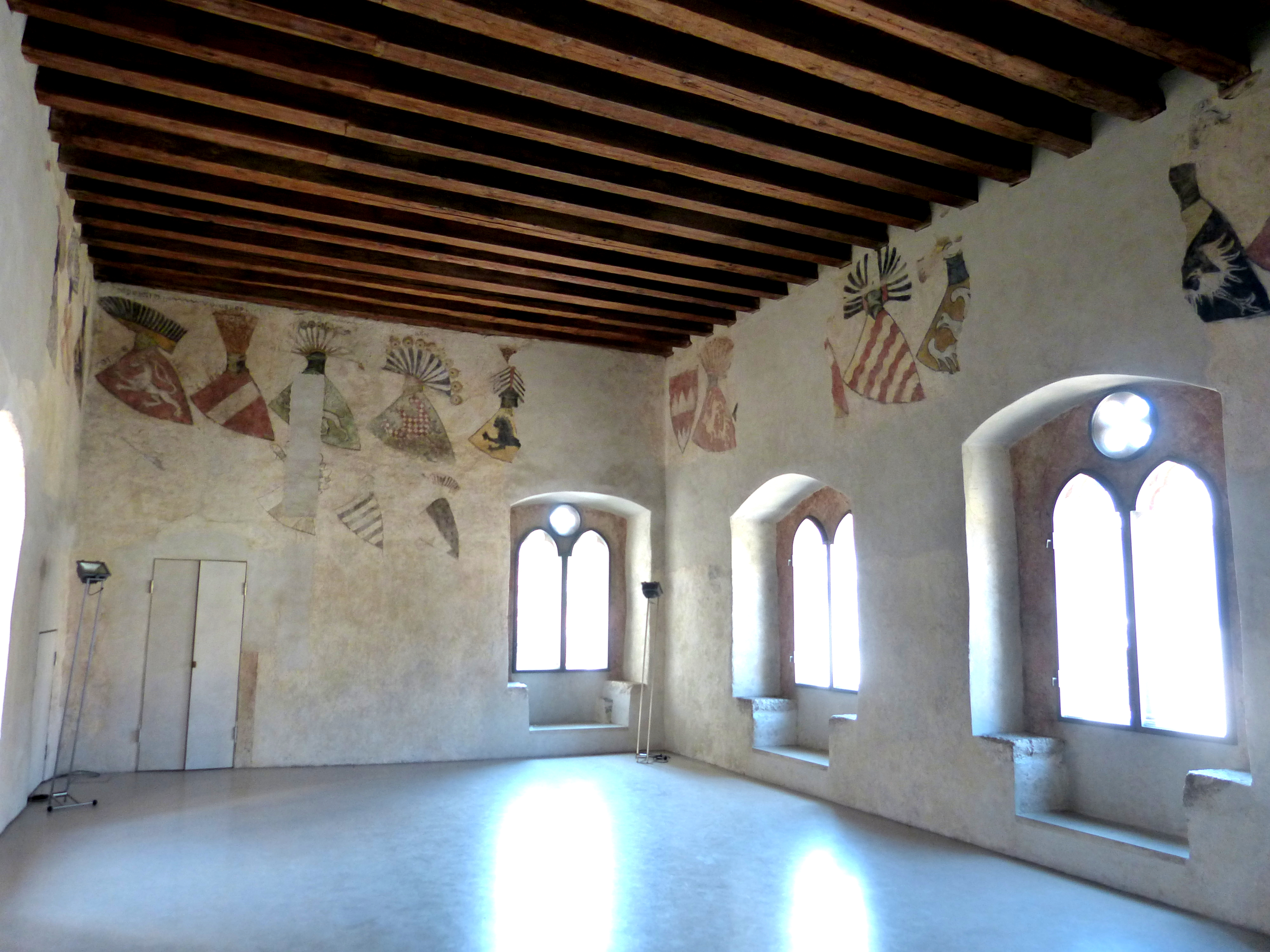
The hall with coats of arms in Gozzoburg Castle in Krems

Banner of arms of Bohemia

Bohemian flag (from about the 19th century)

Arms of the Kingdom of Bohemia by Austrian heraldist Hugo Gerard Ströhl (1851–1919)

Banner of arms of Bohemia (with modern design of the coat of arms of Bohemia)

Flag used by the Bohemian team at the 1912 Olympic Games: the arms of the Kingdom of Bohemia displayed on a white field.

== See also ==
- Flag of Moravia
