= National colours of the Czech Republic =

National colours of the Czech Republic

The national colours of the Czech Republic (Czech: státní barvy České republiky) are one of the national symbols of the Czech Republic, which officially represent the Czech Republic. The colours forming tricolour are in the following order: white, red and blue. The national colours come from the coat of arms of the Czech Republic.

The law explicitly specifies the correct order of colours as white–red–blue (with a white stripe on the top or on the left side) to distinguish Czech national colours from Pan-Slavic colours (blue–white–red) or Russian national colours (white–blue–red). The national colours of the Czech Republic are often confused with those of Russia, even by politicians, which is the subject of heavy criticism by the media.

== History ==
Flag of Bohemia and Czechoslovakia (1918–1920) and Czechia (1990–1992)

Flag of the Protectorate of Bohemia and Moravia (1939–1945)

Traditional colours of Bohemia were white and red. These colours were derived from the coat of arms of Bohemia, but after Czechoslovakia was established, the third Pan-Slavic colour, blue, was added to distinguish the national colours from the Polish ones.

During Nazi Germany occupation of the Czech lands, these colours were used for the flag of the Protectorate.

Although the colours weren't recognized official symbol in the Socialist Constitution from the 1960, the colours still remained in usage, especially during manifestations – such as the Prague Spring or the Velvet Revolution.

The colours are recognized as one of the official symbols of the independent Czech Republic from 1993.

== Usage ==
The national colours are used for indication of the state property and for decoration during state ceremonials. Furthermore, they are used in the medal ribbons, and coffin wreath ribbons. During public holidays some people wear national colours ribbons on commemorative purposes.

== Gallery ==
Flag of the Czech Republic and Czechoslovakia

Coat of arms of Bohemia

Polish flag

== See also ==
- National symbols of the Czech Republic
- Pan-Slavic colors
