= Flying the Moravian flag in individual years =

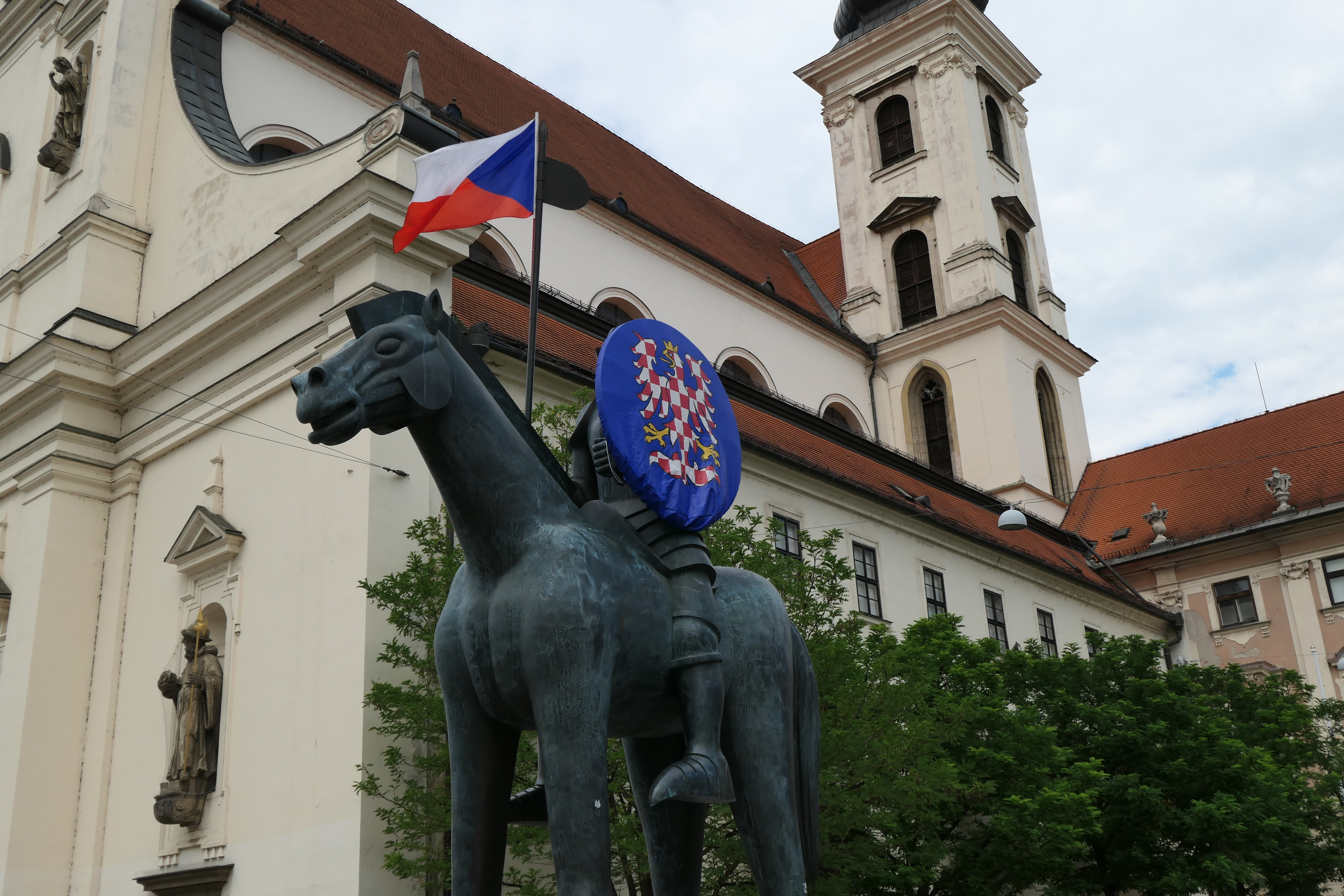
Equestrian statue of Jobst of Moravia on Moravské náměstí Square in Brno on 4 July 2022, with a shield bearing the coat of arms of Moravia and the flag of the Czech Republic attached to a spear.

The Moravian flag was codified in 2002–2003 in the upper hoist field of the flag of the Vysočina Region, the flags of the South Moravian, Olomouc, and Zlín regions, and also in the upper flying field of the flags of the Pardubice and Moravian-Silesian regions: "The flag is blue, with a white and red checkered eagle with a yellow crown and yellow armor in the center of the blue field."

The most appropriate flag of Moravia and banner is its oldest documented form: "a blue field with a white and red checkered eagle". In an expert vexillological opinion on the Moravian flag, experts from the Subcommittee on Heraldry and Vexillology of the Chamber of Deputies of the Parliament of the Czech Republic, Zbyšek Svoboda, Pavel Fojtík, and Petr Exner, and the chairman of the Czech Vexillological Society, Jaroslav Martykán, recommended it on 1 June 2013.

The flying of the Moravian flag is a phenomenon originally sparked by the Moravian National Community's initiative "For the flying of the moravian flag on town halls." The aim of the initiative is to fly the Moravian flag at town halls (and other official buildings) on the Day of Slavic missionaries Cyril and Methodius (July 5) and on other important days, thereby restoring the use of historical symbols of Moravia and promoting Moravian identity in this way: "In our opinion, however, the flag of Moravia should fly alongside the state and municipal flags in celebration of the national holiday of Constantine and Methodius."

Since 2010, over 1,600 municipalities, towns, and market towns in Moravia, Bohemia, and Silesia have joined the initiative, according to an overview compiled by the Moravian National Community.

The Moravian National Community takes a different stance on the "bicolour" flag, with its chairman Jaroslav Krábek saying that it is possible to fly: "On the one hand, the old war standard of the margrave, which is a blue field with the Moravian eagle, but today (people) also know the flag in the colors enacted by the provincial assembly in 1848, which is yellow with red and adorned with an eagle." and other historians. According to Karel Müller, director of the Provincial Archives in Opava (1990–2023), the coat of arms with the eagle on a yellow and red bicolor (from the second half of the 19th century) does not belong: "In no case is it the flag of Moravia as a country. It is the flag of some movement. The historical flag of Moravia was two stripes - yellow and red, as it had been used since the 19th century. (After the establishment of the republic, it no longer had any connection to the coat of arms of Moravia)."

According to Aleš Ulrich, who works for a company selling flags, customers more often than not make the right choice. "They usually buy the blue one."

== Flying in 2013 ==
According to data from the Moravian National Community, more than a third of all towns and municipalities in the historical region of Moravia joined the flag-raising initiative in 2013. This represents a twofold increase in the number of town halls where the flag was to be raised compared to the previous year.

Jaroslav Krábek, chairman of the Moravian National Community, responded to opinions that it would be more appropriate to fly the Moravian flag, which features a white and red checkered eagle with a yellow crown, tongue, and armor on a blue field. He refers to this historical flag as the Margrave's Standard and states: "We have no objection whatsoever to it being flown. It too is a reflection of Moravian history. However, we prefer the gold and red flag with the eagle, which is more popular with the public."

The Moravian National Community association, which initiated the flag flying, emphasized in its statement of 30 June 2013, that the flag displayed is only a civic "symbolic flag." It is a symbolic declaration of allegiance to the history, traditions, and culture of Moravia, not a specific flag of a particular municipality or self-governing territory of the Czech Republic.

The Moravian flag is usually flown on the day before the national holiday.

== Flying between 2014 and 2016 ==
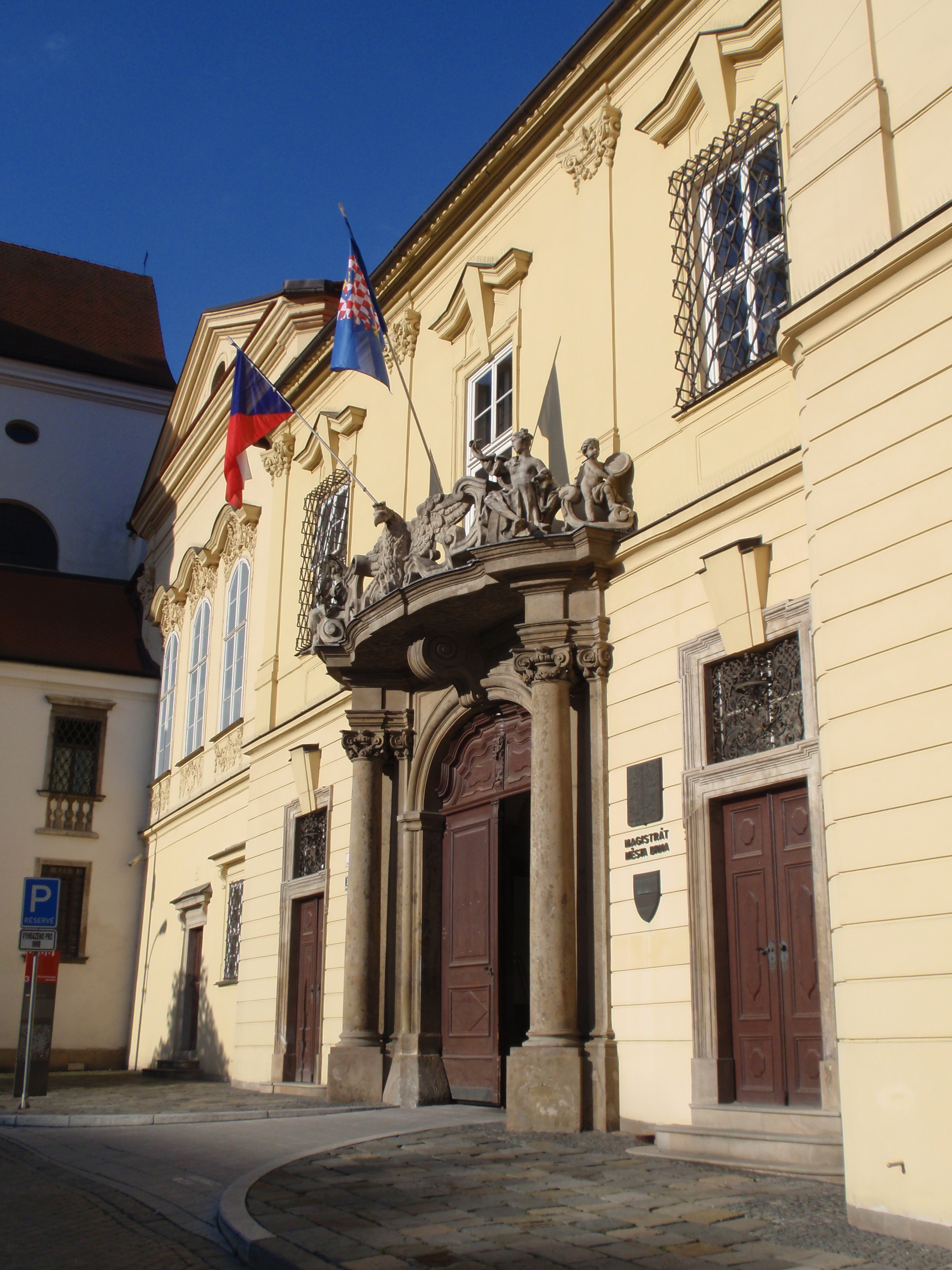
Moravian flag flown by the Brno City Council at the New Town Hall in Brno on 5 July 2016

A year later, the reported number of town halls had already exceeded 1,100.

In newspaper reports on the flying of the Moravian historical flag, the illustration sometimes does not match the description of the flag in the article, the decision of the municipal council, or the flag actually flying. Documents containing municipal council resolutions often only indicate that a decision was made to fly the Moravian flag on the municipal office building. Sometimes the appearance of the flag is explicitly described. The statistical table recording the expected display of flags in 2009–2016, which is created by the Moravian National Community, and the map derived from it, does not distinguish what form of the historical flag of Moravia was or could have been flying. For the purpose of graphic representation, the map uses a reduced symbol of the MNO in the form of a yellow-red bicolour with a yellow-red chequered eagle in a blue field in the centre of the flag.

== Flying in 2017 ==
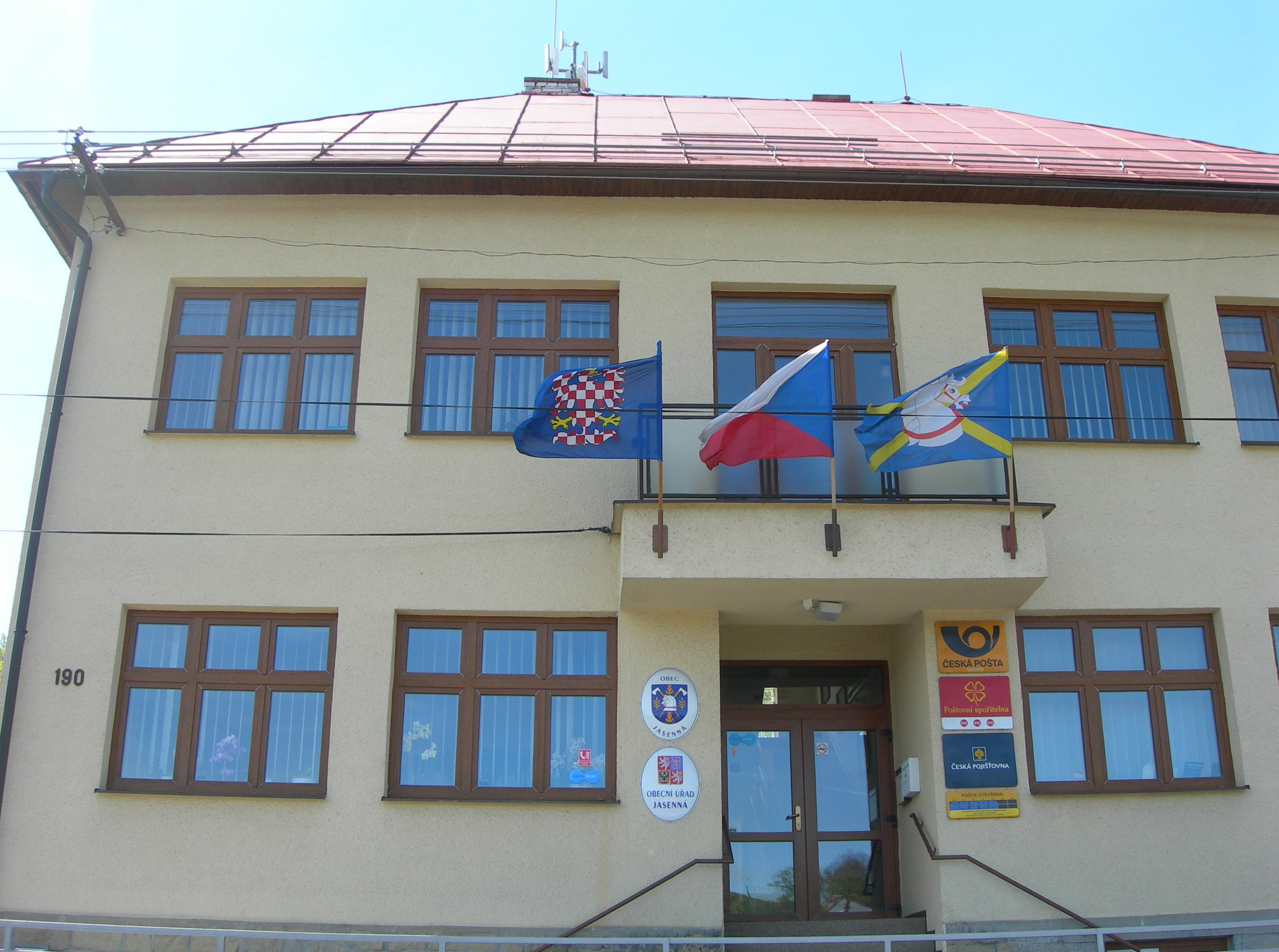
The Moravian flag raised in Jasenná together with the flag of the Czech Republic and the municipal flag of Jasenná on 8 May 2017

The MNC continues to recommend the yellow-red flag with an eagle. When referring to the historical Moravian flag with a white-red checkered yellow-crowned eagle with yellow armor on a blue field, it is called the Margrave's standard. When comparing the two flags, the blue color of the field of this historical flag is referred to in contrast to the red and yellow checkered eagle with a yellow crown and armor and a red tongue located in the center of the flag presented by the MNC instead of the white and red checkered Moravian eagle. While the yellow-red bicolour with the emblem in the centre is referred to by the MNC as the "civil flag", in the second case the words "standard", "Margrave's standard" and "war flag" are used.

== Flying in 2018 ==
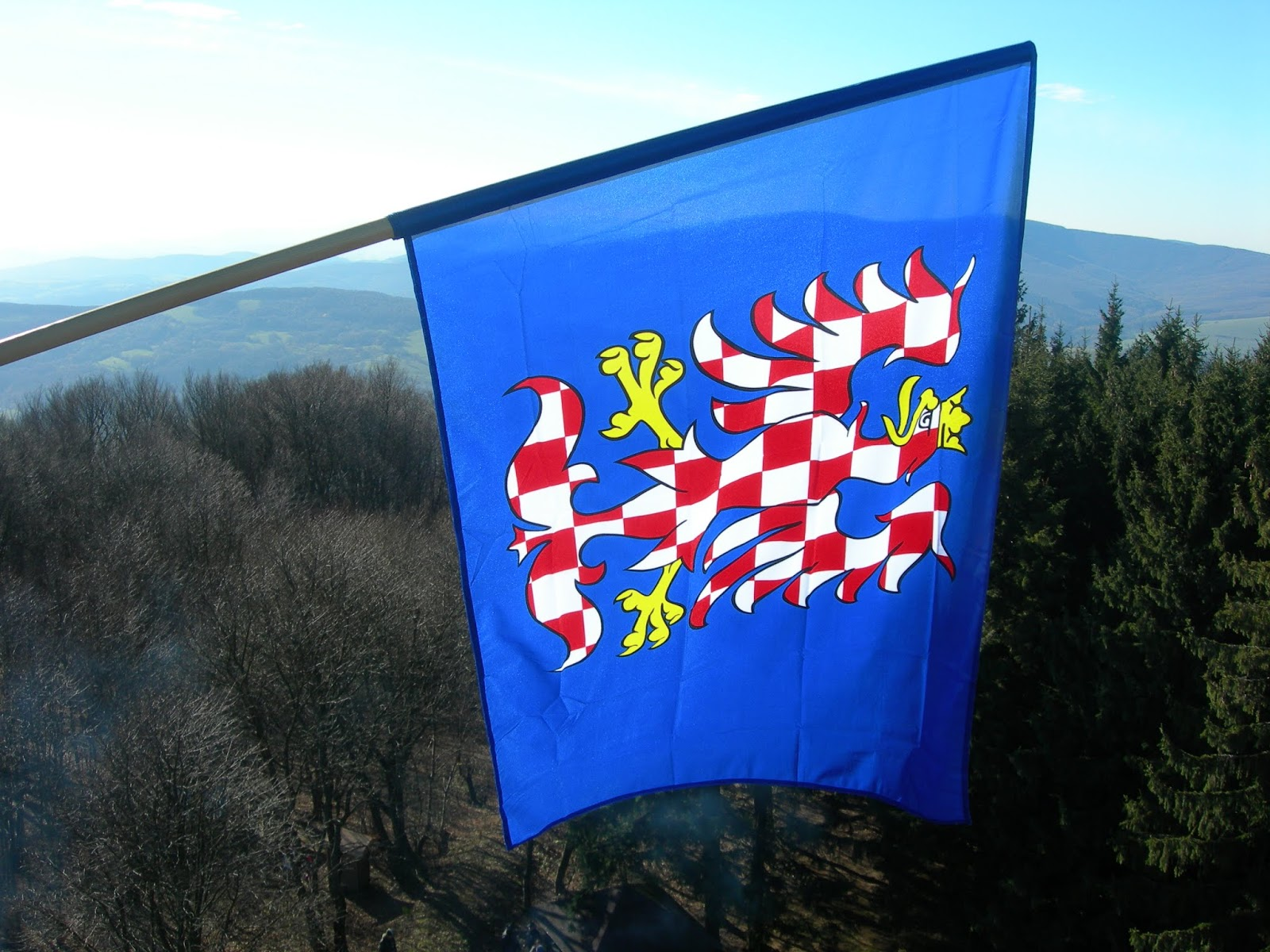
Moravian flag flying on the Velký Lopeník observation tower

Lenka Holaňová, coordinator of the initiative to fly the Moravian flag from the Moravian National Community, said about promoting and keeping track of participating municipalities: "We're reaching out to municipalities or regions that might want to join in flying the flag. We don't care which version of the flag the municipality flies.".

The position of the municipality of Velehrad on flag flying, as communicated by Mayor Aleš Mergental: "We have been participating in this initiative for several years because Velehrad is the successor to the seat of Great Moravia. It is therefore logical that we symbolically fly the Moravian flag. We use the blue version because, according to experts, this is the correct version.".

== Flying in 2020 ==
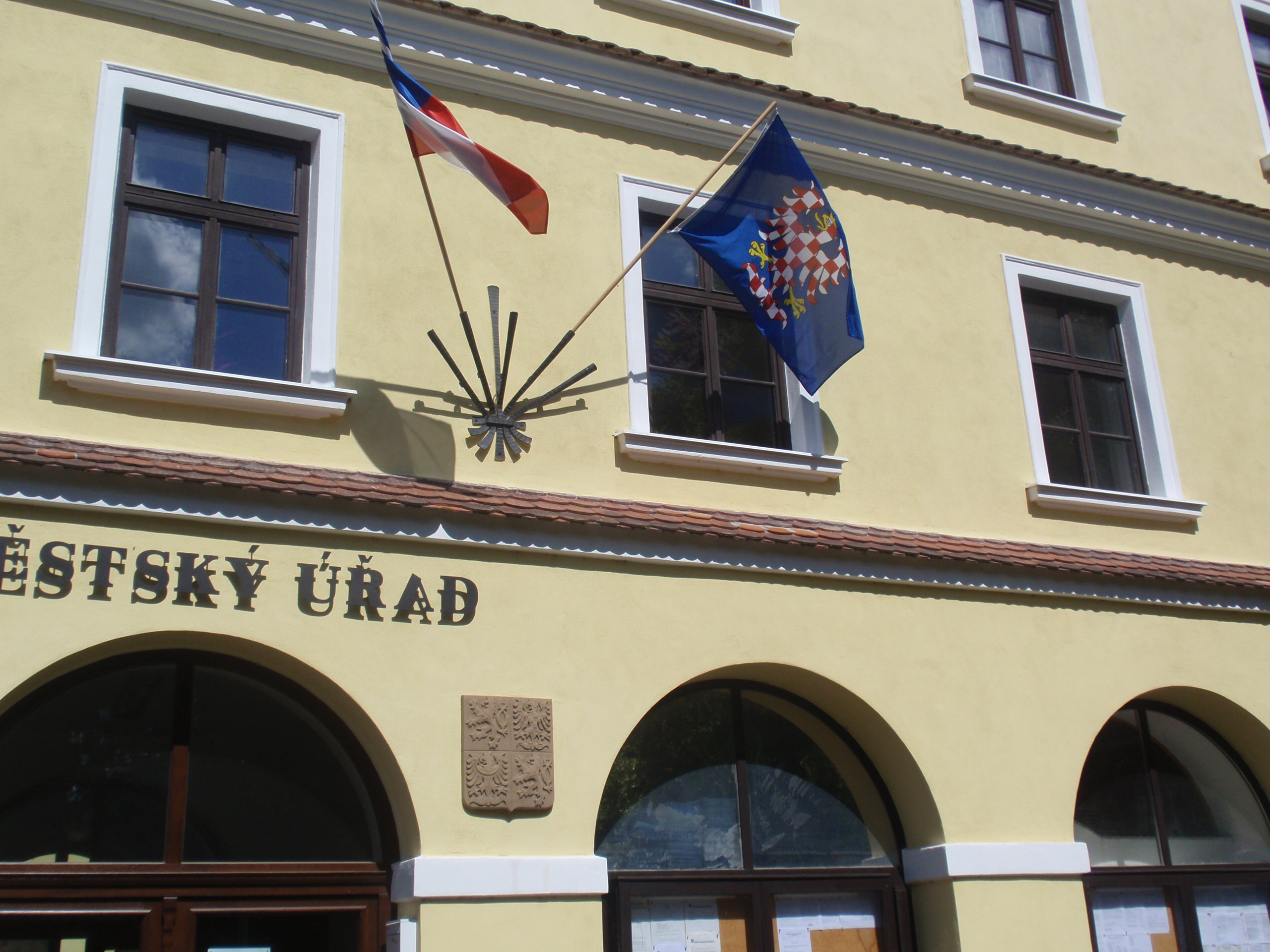
Moravian flag flying on the town hall building in Moravský Krumlov on 4 July 2020

The city of Kroměříž was to participate in the flag initiative for the first time when, on 4 June 2020, the Kroměříž city council discussed a request to fly the moravian flag on the occasion of the national holiday and approved its flying on 5 July 2020. The anticipated event received considerable publicity. Lenka Holaňová, the main organizer of the initiative to fly the moravian flag, named Kroměříž as the largest city that the organizers proudly added to their list in 2020. However, a few days before the actual arrival of the Slavic missionaries Saints Cyril and Methodius in Great Moravia, the decision was revoked by a resolution of the Kroměříž city council on July 2. On July 5, the flags of the Czech Republic and the city of Kroměříž flew at the Kroměříž town hall.

== Flying in 2021 ==
The city of Olomouc was the first to join the initiative to fly the Moravian flag, flying it alongside the flag of the Czech Republic on a flagpole in front of the main entrance to Olomouc City Hall on Horní náměstí (Upper Square) in Olomouc.

=== Blessing of the Moravian flag in Ráječek ===
During a pilgrimage mass held in the municipal chapel of St. Cyril and Methodius in Ráječek, the Moravian flag was blessed by the Zábřeh vicar, Father František Eliáš, on 5 July 2021. The embroidered banner was made for the town of Zábřeh and, together with the flag of the Czech Republic and the flag of the European Union, will add a festive and unique character to the meeting room of the Zábřeh municipal office: "We are patriots in Zábřeh, we have a new hand-embroidered flag of Moravia!"

== Flying in 2023 ==
The mayor of Luhačovice, Marian Ležák, whose citizens wanted to commemorate not only the national and Moravian holiday by flying the flag on the Day of Slavic Missionaries Cyril and Methodius, but also the 1,201st anniversary of the first written mention of the Moravians in 822, said about flying the Moravian flag: "Luhačovice regularly supports this holiday, and I am glad that we are one of the towns that fly the blue Moravian flag."
