= Jasenná =

Jasenná may refer to places in the Czech Republic:

- Jasenná (Náchod District), a municipality and village in the Hradec Králové Region
- Jasenná (Zlín District), a municipality and village in the Zlín Region

== See also ==
- Yasinia, a settlement in Ukraine called Jasenná in Czech
