= Flag of Moravia =

Moravia
- Use: Other
- Design: Historical flag of Moravia (the heraldic flag with Moravian Eagle), recommended by Czech Vexillological Society

Moravia
- Use: Other
- Design: Flag of Moravia as bicolor with gold-red checked eagle (from 2007), by Moravian National Community

An official version of the flag of Moravia, unlike the provincial Moravian coat of arms, does not exist, because such a flag has never been granted to Moravia. However, there are several documented variants of Moravian flags used in the past. The first recorded version dates from the mid-13th century.

== The oldest history ==
There is a description of a Moravian flag in the chronicle of Ottokar aus der Gaal (also known as Otacher ouz der Geul or Ottokar von Steiermark; born about 1265, died between 1318 and 1322): Die Steirische Reimchronik.

Hern Dietrich Spatzmanen
sach man die banier leiten:
in einem rȏten samît breiten
was gewohrt ein lewe wîz.
ouch heten ir baniere flîz,
die von Merhaeren wârn:
ein geschâchzabelten arn
von rȏter und von wîzer varbe
sach man ob in begarbe
waejen von dem winde.

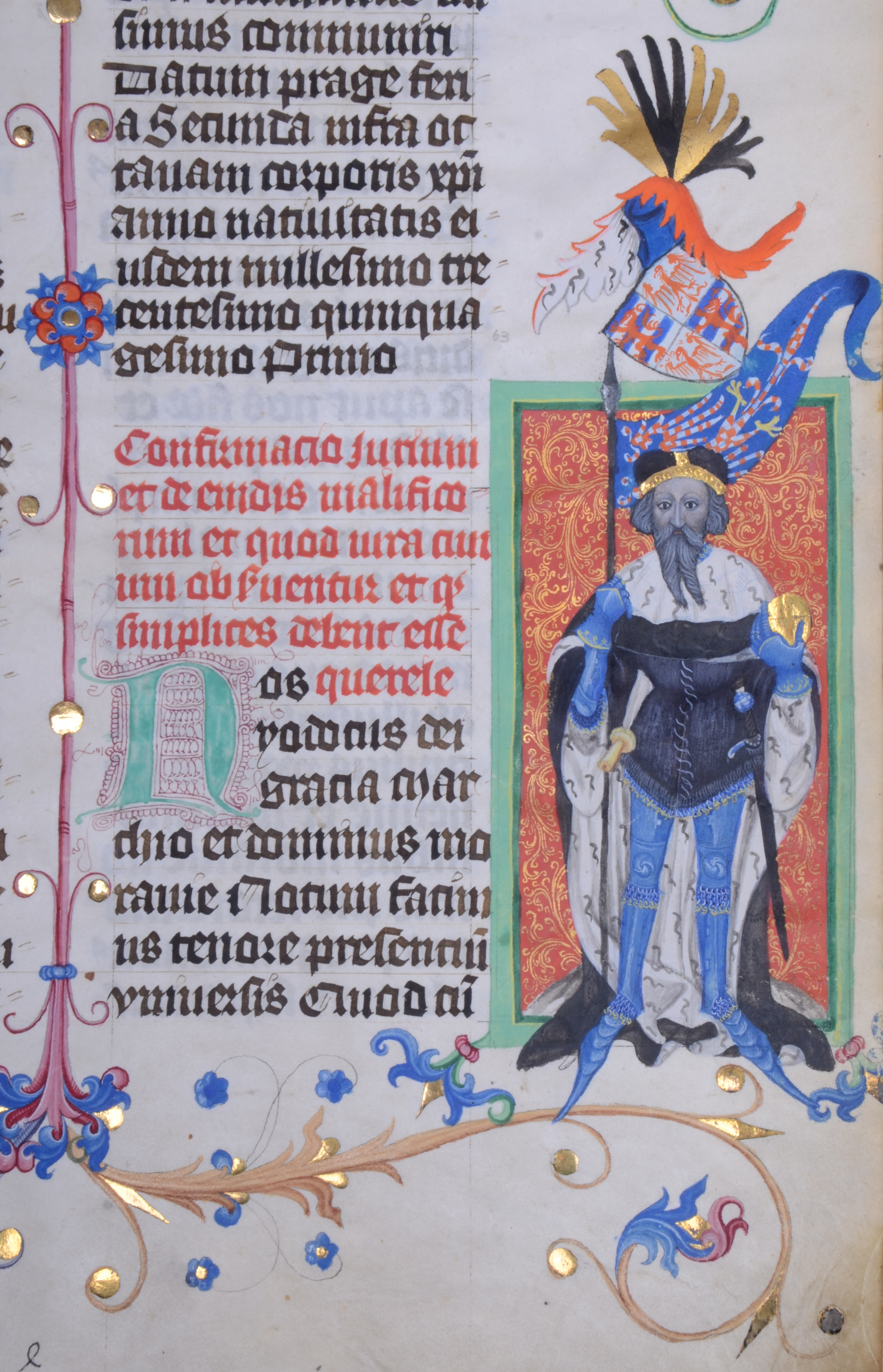
Jobst of Moravia, Gelnhausen Codex, 15th century

The history of the Moravian flag is very varied and begins in the 13th century in the context of the relations between Bohemia and Moravia organized within the construction of a centralized monarchy by the last kings of the Přemyslid dynasty. The colouring of the flag (or banner) was according to vexillological rules derived from the colours of heraldic coats of arms since the Middle Ages.

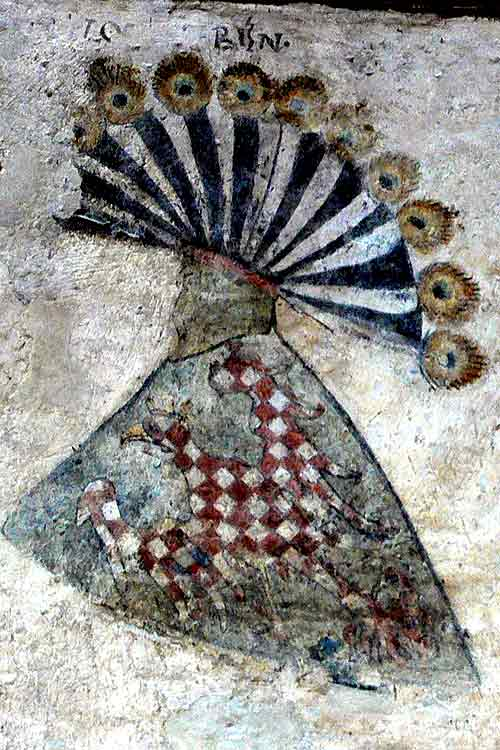
The oldest depiction of coat of arms of Moravia, castle Gozzoburg in Krems

From the reign of Ottokar II of Bohemia, Moravia's coat of arms features a silver-red checquered eagle with a golden crown and claws, which looks to the right and is placed on a blue field.

The oldest surviving full-colour depiction of the coat of arms of Moravia is in a fresco in the hall of Gozzoburg Castle in Krems an der Donau, dating to the early 1270s. The checquered eagle is documented in a depiction from 1286 and later in the late 13th and early 14th century.

The colours of the chequered eagle were derived from the colours of the Bohemian lion (a silver lion on a red shield) and express the connection with the Bohemian king of Moravia and Bohemian monarchy, as, for example, historian Vladimír Růžek recalls. One of the first documented illustrations of the banner of Moravia is the view in the 1407 Gelnhausen Codex, which depicts the Moravian Margrave Jobst of Moravia with a blue banner on which the Moravian white and red eagle is placed with a yellow crown and yellow armor without a shield.

== Modern age ==
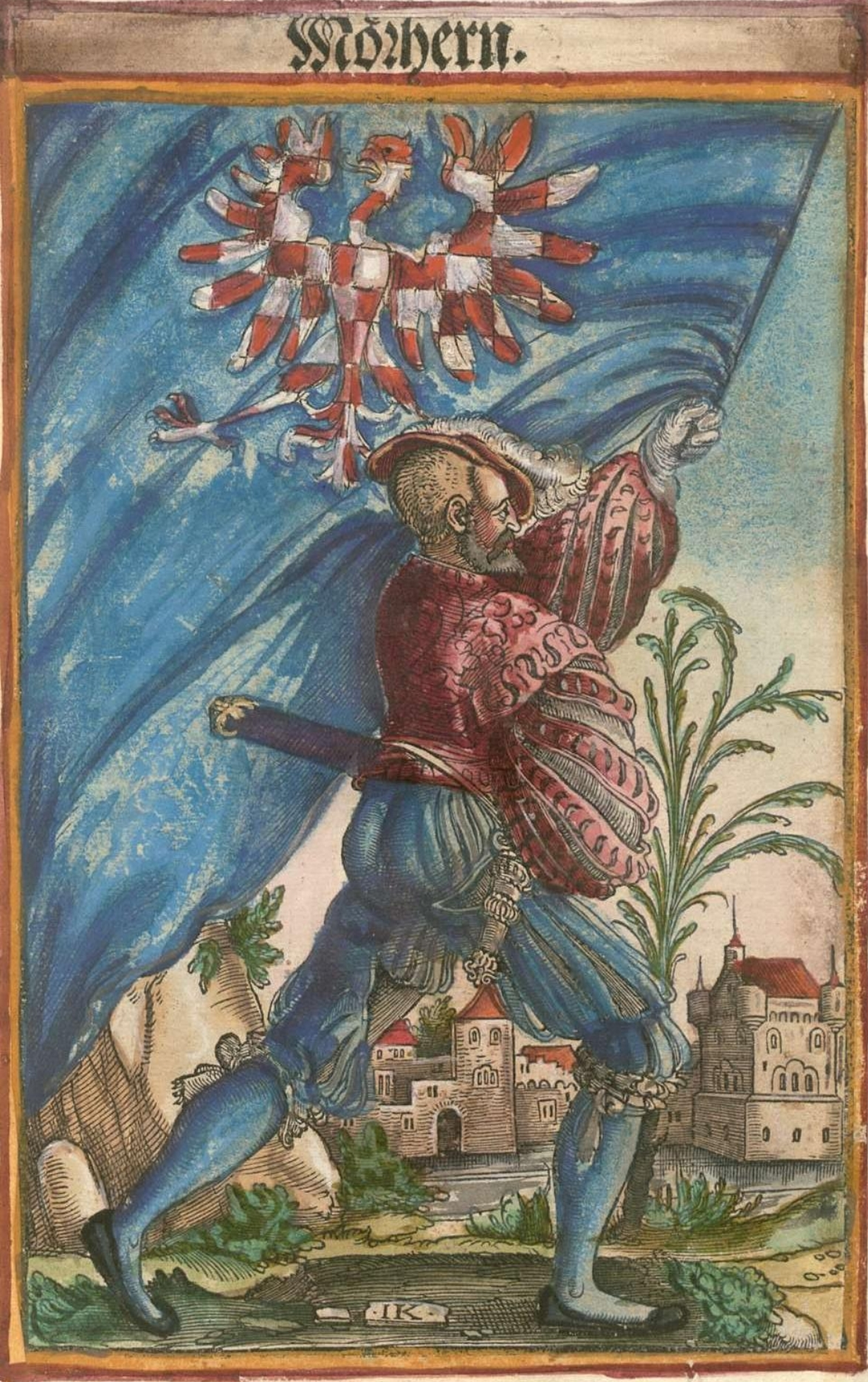
Historical Moravian flag in the work of Jacob Köbel: Wapen des heyligen Römischen Reichs Teutscher nation (1545)

The heraldic flag of Moravia (the flag of Moravia in the form of the flag with coat of arms) is described and drawn for example in the work of Jacob Koebel: Wapen des heyligen römischen Reichs teutscher Nation from 1545.

A report from 1611, attended by the estates (i.e. representatives of the nobility, the clergy and the towns) and the ruler (the Margrave), clearly describes the heraldic standards (blue flags bearing the Moravian eagle) and the so-called livery colours (bicolours) of white and blue (a blue-and-white flag), in accordance with the first silver square in the eagle’s chequered pattern and the colours of the shield (as a logical counterpart to the Bohemian white-and-red colours, referring to the silver lion on a red field): "Za J. M. královskou jízda Markrabství moravského se dvoumi kornéty modrými pospolu, na nichž erb zemský téhož markrabství s osmi trubači: po nich nesen byl praporček obdýlný modrý a bílý. Za ním pak zase rejtaři téhož markrabství pod dvoumi tolikéž kornéty modrými, s erbem jich zemským a šesti trubači.".

Historically, there were several versions of the widely used and documented Moravian flags, which were mainly used during the 19th century in parallel to bicolours and tricolours derived from tinctures of provincial coat of arms. According to some authors, therefore, the Moravian flag consists of three horizontal strips of red, white, and blue. This color combination was the flag of the Moravian patriots in the 19th century. A delegation of the Moravians to the Slavonic Congress in Prague in 1848 allegedly marched under a tricolour with the top horizontal stripe white, the middle red and the bottom blue. White, red and blue colors are referred to as Moravia in the Nový prostonárodní popis Čech, Moravy a Slezska from 1854 and in some textbooks from the 19th century. According to Ivan Štarha, the Moravian colours in 1915 were white, red and blue, and between the years 1915 and 1918 yellow, red and blue.

At the beginning of the 19th century, Moravia was a non-independent region that had been part of the Austrian Empire since 1804, an empire that had been established shortly before the final dissolution of the Holy Roman Empire. It was one of the so-called Crown Lands, governed by a provincial governor. It was bound by regulations issued by the central government in Vienna. There is little evidence from earlier times of the use of the Moravian regional colors. The emperor was the ruler of Moravia, and since the title of margrave was just one of many he held, he did not need a specific visual representation for it. Thus, for almost the entire first half of the 19th century, the provincial colors did not carry the same significance as they did from the middle of the century onward. The powers of the provincial estates’ administrative bodies were limited. They did not have the authority to represent or be represented.

Provincial self-government was granted fairly extensive powers only with the enactment of the December Constitution in 1861, following which individual provincial constitutions were enacted. However, neither these nor any documents of lower legal force specified provincial colors or provincial flags. Although these terms did exist in the 19th century, they were empty—that is, they were not defined legally, either in general or in specific terms. When describing the period before 1918, one cannot therefore state that “the provincial flag of the Margraviate of Moravia was a yellow-and-red horizontal bicolor,” because it was not defined as such in any legal document. Can we simply say that “the provincial self-governing authorities used red and yellow as the provincial colors from 1848 to 1918,” or, if justifiable, “as the provincial flag of Moravia, the provincial self-governing authorities used a red-and-yellow bicolor from 1848 to 1918.”

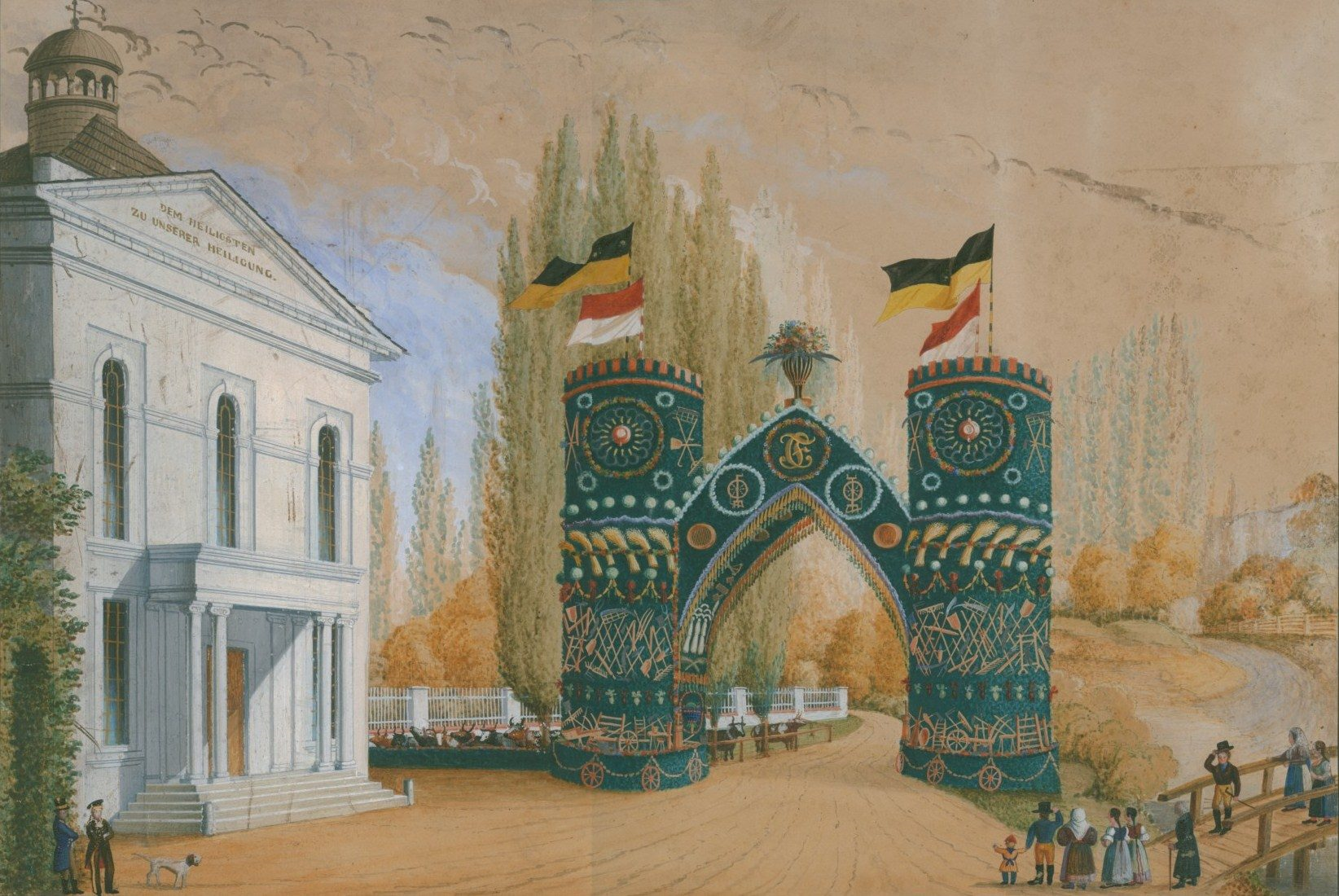
A triumphal arch erected in Kunín in 1845 to mark the visit of Archduke Franz Karl. A contemporary description identifies the black-and-yellow and red-and-white bicolors flying from the towers as the Austrian colors and the Moravian provincial colors, respectively.

The absence of a legal regulation explains why “provincial flags” are depicted in various ways in publications from this period. In most cases, authors derived them based on a few actually known flags and on the heraldic rules governing the respective coats of arms. A particular problem in Moravia in the 19th century was the fact that the Moravian coat of arms existed in two forms. Its historical, officially valid description of the imperial coat of arms—which had been in use for centuries—was a silver-and-red chequered eagle with a golden crown and armor on a blue shield. However, Emperor Frederick III of Habsburg’s charter of December 7, 1462, which authorized the use of a checkered eagle in gold and red—although this variation did not gain widespread acceptance in practice—led to after the charter came to the attention of representatives of the Moravian provincial administration at the turn of the 18th and 19th centuries—particularly from the 1830s and 1840s onward—to increasingly vigorous efforts by the provincial administration to have the charter recognized by the emperor. And even though it was not officially recognized until 1915, a number of statements issued by the Viennese authorities suggested that they did not object to the use of the golden and red checkered eagle.

Throughout the 19th century, the question was whether the valid but officially ineffective letter of arms issued by Frederick III of Habsburg took precedence over the historically used and confirmed coat of arms of Moravia. The question of the provincial colors—to which the question of the design of a (potential) provincial flag was related—was, of course, influenced by differing opinions on the correctness (validity) of the provincial coat of arms.

The provincial flag of the Margraviate of Moravia had not been determined even during the First World War, after the gold-and-red chequered pattern of the eagle had been officially established in the coat of arms of Moravia. In 1917, following a thorough examination of the entire matter, the Imperial-Royal Ministry of the Interior merely ordered that, when depicting the flag, the Moravian provincial colours should continue to be shown in the order of red and yellow; this order corresponded to established custom and did not contradict the description of the Moravian coat of arms dated 10 October 1915.

In Ludvík Ritter’s Pocket Dictionary of Journalism and Conversation (Kapesní slovníček novinářský a konversační), published in 1851, the following is stated regarding the colors of cockades: "A cockade is a rosette or round bow on a hat or coat, by which a certain sentiment, nationality, unity, congregation, etc., is distinguished. When women wear them, they put them in their hair or on their breasts. The cockades of the various political creeds of 1848 are well known, especially those of the Slavic, red-white-blue, then black-red-yellow parties of Germany, and their multiple disputes. The imperial Austrian one, which the army wears in our country, is black and yellow, the Bohemian and Polish white and red, the Moravian or even Bohemian-Moravian, then the South Slavic, like the Slavic one. The Ruthenian is yellow-blue, the Hungarian and the revolutionary Polish red-white-green, the Prussian black-white, etc. In Prague, since 1849, all cockades have been forbidden to private persons without distinction.".

The Czechoslovak Republic restored the white or silver color to the Moravian coat of arms (Act No. 252/1920). Provincial flags are not regulated by subsequent legislation (Act no. 269/1936, Law no. 222/1939, no. 163/1960, and now valid Acts no. 3/1993 Coll., No. 352/2001 Coll.).

Today, a yellow-red bicolour is sometimes used as the flag of Moravia, especially by some Moravian parties, associations and other organizations. The yellow-red bicolour has been used along with other bicolours and tricolours since the second half of 19th century, according to certain authors (Lubomír Emil Havlík, Milan Hlinomaz).

Hereinafter referred to as Morava: k státoprávnímu postavení země v průběhu věků. As stated by Milan Hlinomaz:

Zdá se, že žlutočervený prapor, logicky odvozený od sněmem v roce 1848 přijaté formy šachování moravské orlice, nesl oficiální posvěcení úřady a pro svou podobnost s říšskou vlajkou, i sympatie moravského obyvatelstva německé národnosti.

The historian Ivan Štarha argues that Moravia was never awarded the flag. To today's yellow-red bicolour is sometimes added the provincial coat of arms with a red-gold checquered eagle. The red-gold checquered eagle variant was introduced in 2007, and was recommended by some members and supporters of the Moravian National Community to avoid a possible misidentification with other flags, for example the flag of the capital city Prague, which also consists of yellow and red horizontal stripes. This option is criticized by some Bohemian (Czech) nationalist experts.

Both of these versions, however, have been criticized by certain experts approached by the media (specifically historian Milan Řepa, vexillologist Karel Müller, and heraldist Jiří Louda).

The appearance of the flag has been a subject of discussion for more than 100 years. One variant consists of two bars, a yellow bar in the upper half, and a red bar in the lower half.

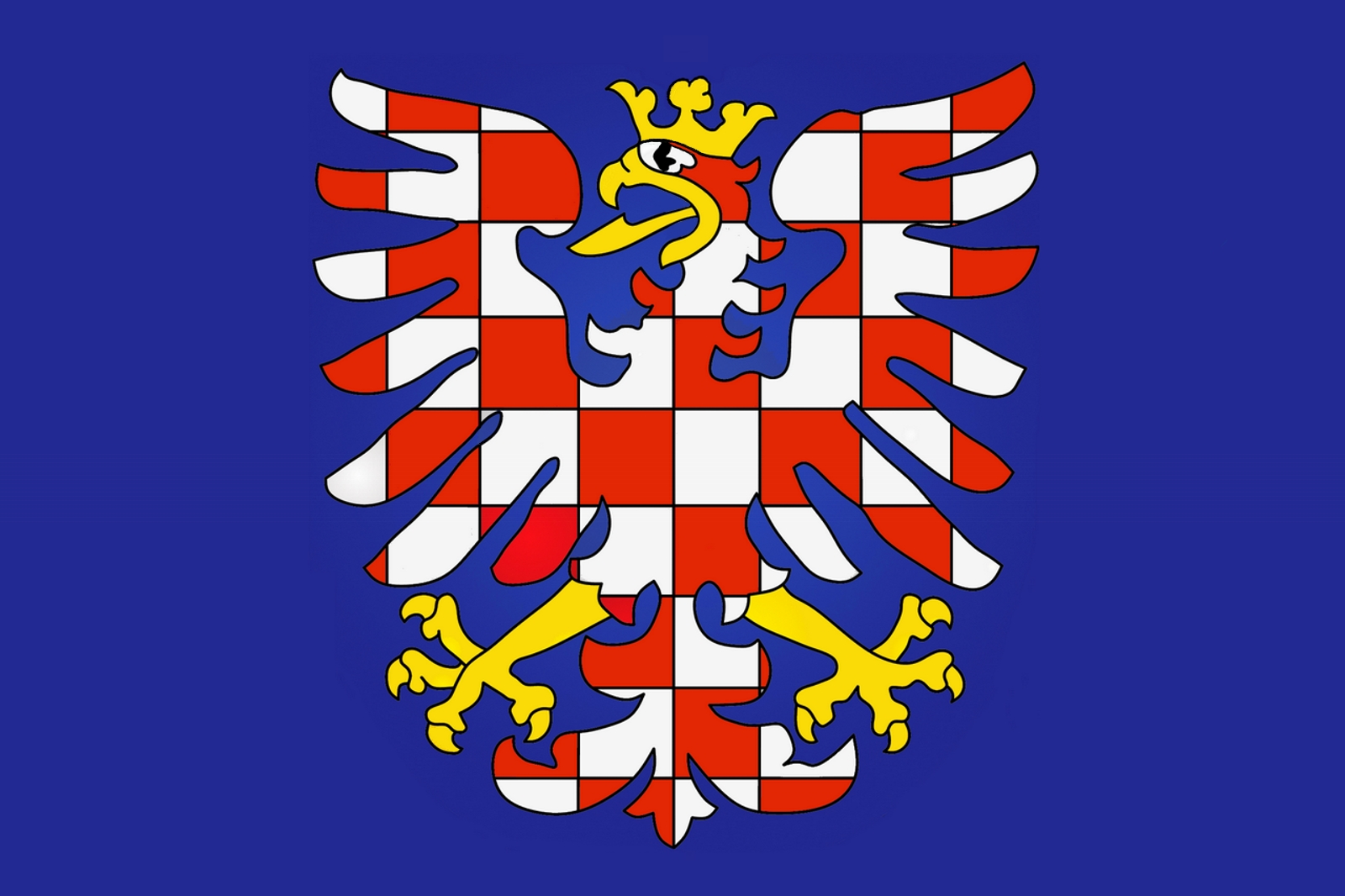
Banner of arms of the Margrave of Moravia, Margraviate of Moravia, Moravia

White-red bicolour used till the beginning of the 20th century

Red-white bicolour used till the beginning of the 20th century

Yellow-red bicolour used simultaneously with other bicolours and tricolours since the second half of 19th century

Red-yellow bicolour: another historical flag of Moravia coming from the second half of the 19th century or the beginning of the 20th century

One version of the flag of Moravia in the form of white-red-blue tricolor, allegedly used by the deputies of Czech-speaking Moravians to the Slavonic Congress in Prague in 1848

Red-white-blue tricolor used in the second half of 19th century and in the beginning of the 20th century

Red-blue-white tricolour used in the 19th century and early 20th century

== The Moravian flag on the regional flags ==
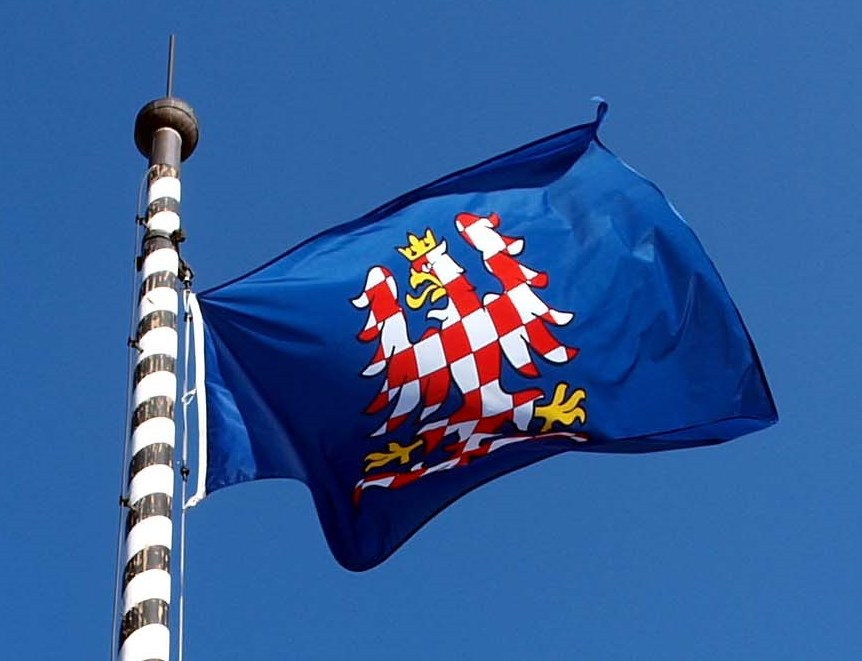
Historical flag of Moravia

Flag of the Pardubice Region

Flag of the Vysočina Region

Flag of the Olomouc Region

Flag of the Moravia-Silesia Region

Flag of the Zlín Region

== Blue flag with the Moravian eagle ==
In the vexillological report on the Moravian flag, which was submitted on 1 June 2013 by the experts of the Sub-Committee on Heraldry and Vexillology of the Chamber of Deputies of the Parliament of the Czech Republic (Sub-committee of the Committee on Science, Education, Culture, Youth and Physical Education) — Zbyšek Svoboda, Pavel Fojtík, Petr Exner and the President of the Czech Vexillological Society, Jaroslav Martykán — the Moravian flag and banner are regarded as the most historically appropriate in their oldest documented form, i.e. a blue field with a white-and-red chequered eagle.

== See also ==
- Flag of Bohemia
- Coat of arms of Silesia
- Flying the Moravian flag in individual years
