= Coins of the Czechoslovak koruna (1945) =

Between 1946 and 1948, 20 and 50 haléřů and 1 and 2 koruny coins were introduced. The lower two denominations were struck in bronze, the higher two in cupro-nickel. The designs of all but the 2 koruny were based on those of the interwar coins but the coins were smaller. In 1950, aluminium 1 korun coins were introduced, followed by aluminium 20 and 50h in 1951. 5 korun coins were minted but not introduced. A monetary reform occurred in 1953.

1946–1953 issues
Value	Technical parameters			Description			Date of		
Value	Diameter	Mass	Composition	Edge	Obverse	Reverse	first minting	issue	withdrawal
20 h	18 mm	2.5 g	Brass; 92% copper 8% zinc	Smooth	Coat of arms, "REPUBLIKA ČESKOSLOVENSKÁ", year of minting	Indication of value, ears of wheat, sickle	1947	29 May 1948	31 May 1953
20 h	16 mm	0.5 g	98% aluminium 2% magnesium	Smooth	Coat of arms, "REPUBLIKA ČESKOSLOVENSKÁ", year of minting	Indication of value, ears of wheat, sickle	1951	22 October 1951	31 May 1953
50 h	20 mm	3 g	Brass; 92% copper 8% zinc	Smooth	Coat of arms, "REPUBLIKA ČESKOSLOVENSKÁ", year of minting	Indication of value, ears of wheat, branches with leaves	1947	25 March 1947	31 May 1953
50 h	18 mm	0.6 g	98% aluminium 2% magnesium	Smooth	Coat of arms, "REPUBLIKA ČESKOSLOVENSKÁ", year of minting	Indication of value, ears of wheat, branches with leaves	1951	1 September 1951	31 May 1953
1 Kčs	21 mm	4.5 g	Cupronickel; 80% copper 20% nickel	Milled	Coat of arms, "REPUBLIKA ČESKOSLOVENSKÁ", year of minting	Indication of value, woman with ears of wheat and sickle	1946	25 April 1946	31 May 1953
1 Kčs	21 mm	1.3 g	98% aluminium 2% magnesium	Milled	Coat of arms, "REPUBLIKA ČESKOSLOVENSKÁ", year of minting	Indication of value, woman with ears of wheat and sickle	1947	17 March 1950	31 May 1953
2 Kčs	23.5 mm	6 g	Cupronickel; 80% copper 20% nickel	Milled	Coat of arms, "REPUBLIKA ČESKOSLOVENSKÁ", year of minting	Indication of value, Juraj Jánošík	1947	27 May 1947	31 May 1953
5 Kčs	23.5 mm	?	98% aluminium 2% magnesium	Milled	Coat of arms, "REPUBLIKA ČESKOSLOVENSKÁ", year of minting	Indication of value, factory	1951	never	—
