= Football records and statistics in Slovakia =

This page details football records in Slovakia.

== Team records ==
=== Most championships won ===
==== Overall ====
- 8, Slovan Bratislava (1993–94, 1994–95, 1995–96, 1998–99, 2008–09, 2010–11, 2012–13, 2013–14)

==== Consecutives ====
- 3, ŠK Slovan Bratislava (1993–94, 1994–95, 1995–96)
- 3, MŠK Žilina (2001–02, 2002–03, 2003–04)

=== Most seasons in Slovak Liga ===
- 19, MŠK Žilina
- 19, FC Spartak Trnava

== Total titles won ==
As of 16 May 2026

Club	Domestic Titles					International Titles					Overall titles
Club	League (Slovakia + Czechoslovakia)	Slovak Cup (1969–present)	Czechoslovak Cup	Slovak Super Cup	Total	Small Club World Cup	UEFA Cup Winners' Cup	Mitropa Cup	Intertoto Cup	Total	Overall titles
Slovan Bratislava	32 (24+8)	17	5	4	58	-	1	-	-	1	59
Spartak Trnava	6 (1+5)	9	4	1	20	1	-	1	-	2	22
Žilina	9 (9+0)	2	-	4	15	-	-	-	-	-	15
Inter Bratislava	3 (2+1)	6	-	1	10	-	-	1	2	3	13
VSS Košice	2 (2+0)	5	1	1	9	-	-	-	-	-	9
Petržalka	2 (2+0)	2	-	1	5	-	-	-	-	-	5
Lokomotíva Košice	-	3	2	-	5	-	-	-	-	-	5
AS Trenčín	2 (2+0)	2	-	-	4	-	-	-	-	-	4
Tatran Prešov	-	1	-	-	1	-	-	1	1	2	3
Ružomberok	1 (1+0)	2	-	-	3	-	-	-	-	-	3
Nitra	-	-	-	-	0	-	-	-	2	2	2
TTS Trenčín	-	1	-	-	1	-	-	-	1	1	2
Dukla Banská Bystrica	-	2	-	-	2	-	-	-	-	-	2
DAC Dunajská Streda	-	1	1	-	2	-	-	-	-	-	2
Senec	-	1	-	1	2	-	-	-	-	-	2
Engerauer	1 (1+0)	-	-	-	1	-	-	-	-	-	1
OAP Bratislava	1 (1+0)	-	-	-	1	-	-	-	-	-	1
Považská Bystrica	1 (1+0)	-	-	-	1	-	-	-	-	-	1
Rusj Užhorod	1 (1+0)	-	-	-	1	-	-	-	-	-	1
Futura Humenné	-	1	-	-	1	-	-	-	-	-	1
Púchov	-	1	-	-	1	-	-	-	-	-	1
ViOn Zlaté Moravce	-	1	-	-	1	-	-	-	-	-	1

== See also ==
- List of football clubs by competitive honours won
