= Coat of arms of Moravia =

Coat of arms with the Moravian eagle

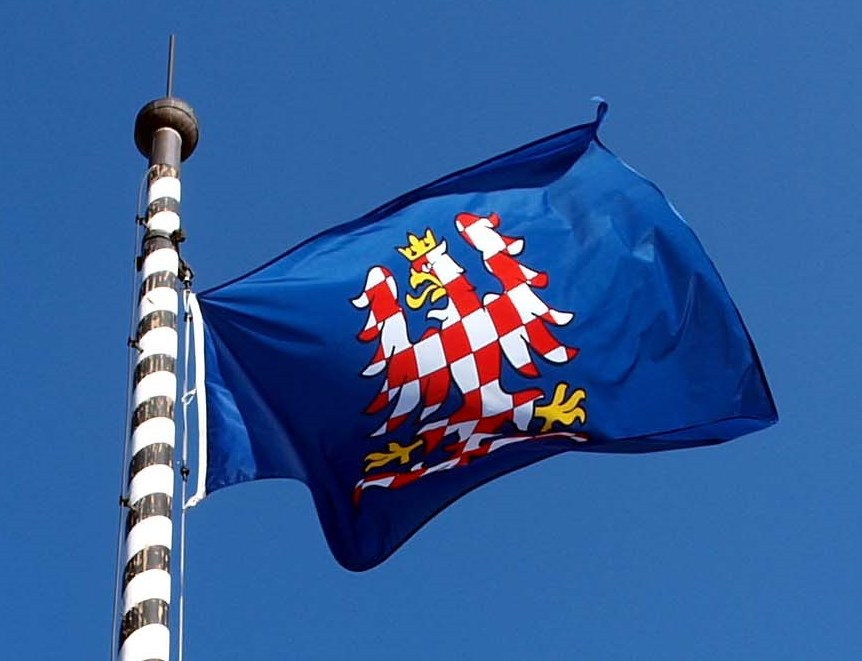
Moravian banner of arms

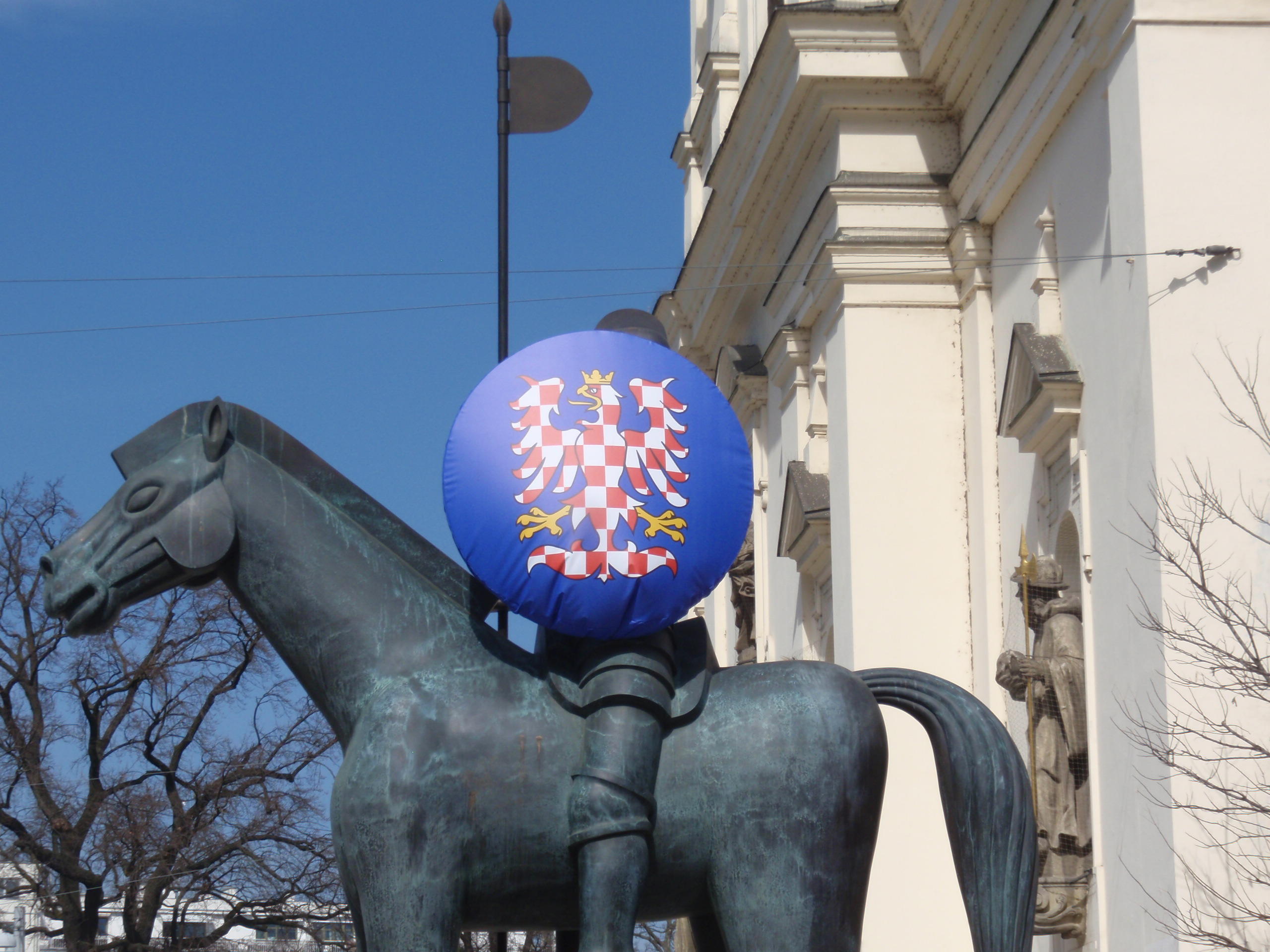
Equestrian statue of Jobst of Moravia on Moravian Square (Moravské náměstí) in Brno. The round shield held by the knight was provided with the Moravian coat of arms on March 26, 2021, to commemorate the 2021 census.

The coat of arms of Moravia has been used for centuries to represent Moravia, a traditional province in the present-day Czech Republic. The coat of arms is also present in a field of the coat of arms of the Czech Republic.

The coat of arms of Moravia is charged with a gold-crowned, white-red-checkered eagle with golden claws, beak, and tongue. The first coat, the seal of the Margraviate of Moravia, is documented only by one worn copy. The gable seal had a design of a lion. The Přemyslid margrave used a seal with a lion in 1239 (as Margrave Vladislav Jindřich had), but the number of tails is unclear; only two are visible on the seal of the margrave (and later king) Ottokar I of Bohemia. The second coat of arms, used from 1233 to 1239, was a typical equestrian one-sided design with the rider bearing an eagle (rather than a lion) on the shield. It is not a Moravian eagle, but a symbol of independence from the Bohemian king in Prague. The seal's equestrian image with an eagle instead of the traditional lion signified the Přemyslid margrave's resistance against Wenceslas I his older brother and king of Bohemia.

In 1758, the citizens of Olomouc were granted the Moravian coat of arms by Maria Theresa in gratitude for their defense against Prussian troops under King Frederick the Great during the Seven Years' War, then with the initials 'F' (for Emperor Francis I), 'M' and 'T' (for Maria Theresa). The coat of arms also appeared on the town seal of Znojmo in 1272, with a 'Z' as its escutcheon. From 1915 to 1918, the Moravian eagle was checkered in red and gold instead of the traditional red and silver.

== Moravian eagle ==
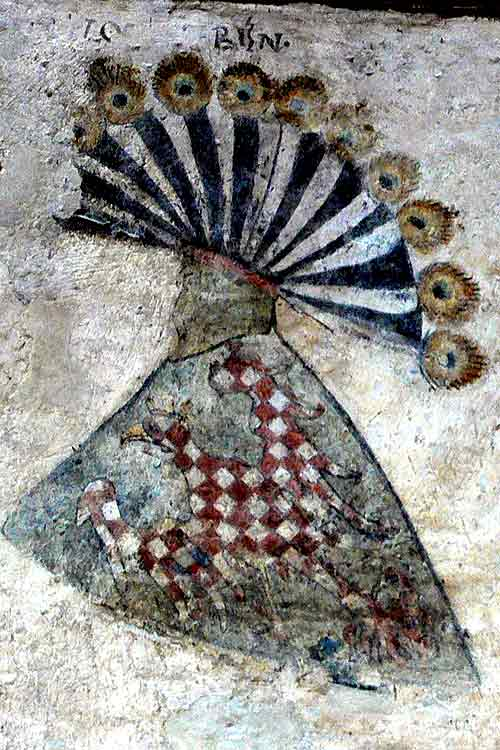
Oldest preserved color representation of the coat of arms of the Moravian margrave

In its current form, the Moravian eagle was created by Ottokar II of Bohemia in the mid-13th century after he became the King of Bohemia. The Moravian margrave began to use the silver-red-checkered Moravian Eagle on a blue field in addition to the Bohemian silver lion on a red field. Since then, the silver-red-checkered eagle with a gold crown and gold beak, tongue and claws on a blue shield has been used on works of art and official documents.

=== Oldest color representation ===
The oldest color representation of the Moravian eagle is in the hall of the town castle (or palace) of Gozzoburg in Krems, Austria; Ottokar II of Bohemia ruled present-day Austria. Since no later than the Luxembourg era, the silver-red checkered eagle was considered the coat of arms of the Moravian region. According to some researchers, these colors derived from the colors of the Bohemian lion (a silver lion on a red shield) and linked Moravia to the king of Bohemia and the Czech monarchy.

=== Other old color representations ===
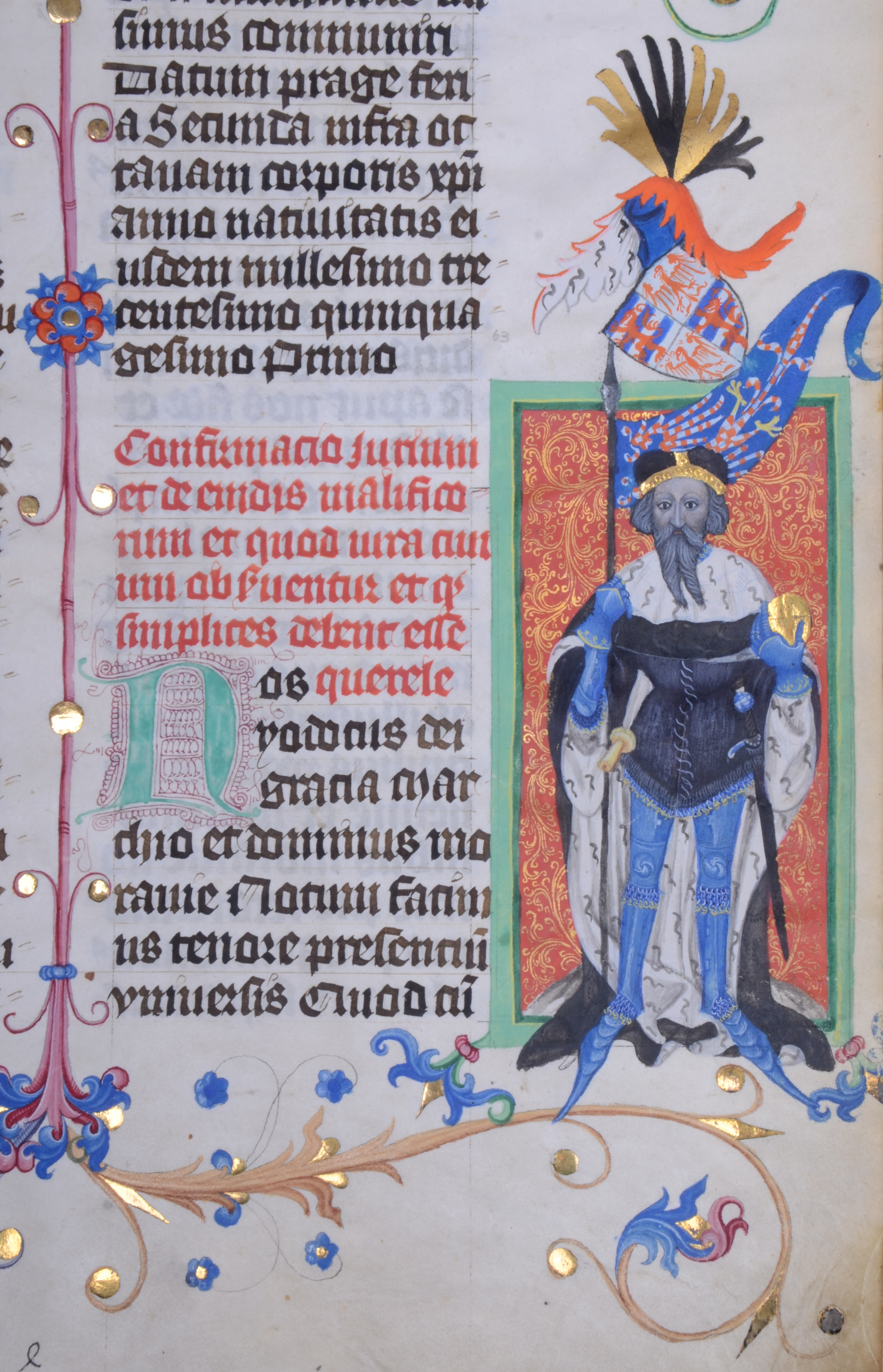
Jobst of Moravia, miniature in the Gelnhausen Codex

Another version of the Moravian coat of arms dates to 1361 in the coats-of-arms gallery of Charles IV at the castle of Lauf, built in 1356 by Emperor Charles IV. near Nuremberg on the Reich Road between Prague and Nuremberg on the ruins of the old Stauf castle. The coats-of-arms hall contains the arms of Moravia and Bohemia, other countries, clergy, nobility, and cities.

=== Origin of the chessboard ===
The Moravian eagle differs from other heraldic eagles in its distinctive chessboard design (aquila scacata). The eagle's chessboard is documented on the oldest known seal of Znojmo, from September 1, 1272, the coat of arms of King Ottokar II of Bohemia (who had been the Moravian margrave since 1247). In accordance with convention, the chessboard is formed with lozenges.

=== Gelnhausen Codex ===
The Gelnhausen Codex, written by Jihlava city scribe Jan de Gelnhausen in the early 15th century, contains many illuminated representations of the Moravian eagle and the Bohemian lion.

=== Oldest written mention ===
The oldest written mention of the Moravian eagle is in the versed chronicle of Ottokar Styria, which describes events in Central Europe from the mid-13th century to the end of the first decade of the 14th century. In the description of the battle of Kressenbrunn on July 12, 1260, in which troops of Ottokar II of Bohemia defeated those of the Hungarian King Bela IV, the ekphrasis of the Bohemian banner ("in einem rȏten samît ... ein lewe wîz"; a white lion on a red field) is followed by that of the Moravian banner ("ein geschâchzabelten arn von rȏter und von wîzer varbe"; a white-and-red chequered eagle).

== The charter of Frederick III. Habsburg ==
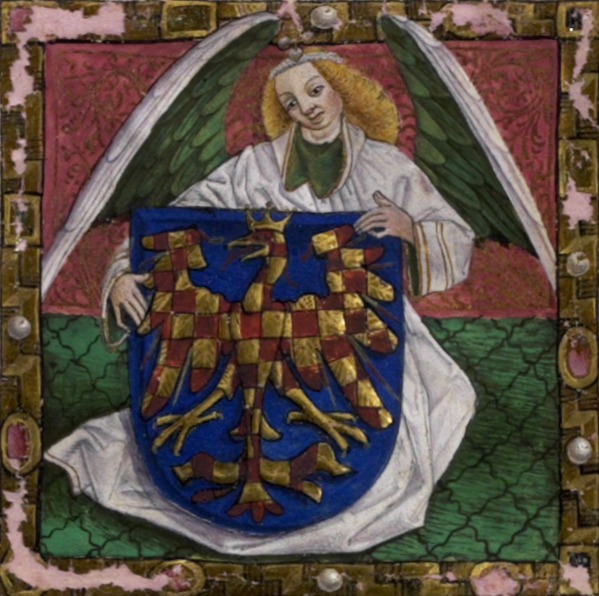
1462 miniature with coat of arms issued by Frederick III

The charter of Frederick III, Holy Roman Emperor, published by him on the initiative governor of Moravia and marshal of the Kingdom of Bohemia Henri de Lipá on December 7, 1462, changed the Moravian eagle's original silver to gold ("color albus in glaucum sive aureum transmutetur"; white color changed to yellow or gold). The privilege illustrates complex international relations during the reign of King George of Poděbrady. Frederick III issued it to Moravia as a Holy Roman Emperor, interfering with the Bohemian crown's internal affairs; Moravia was ruled by the King of Bohemia.

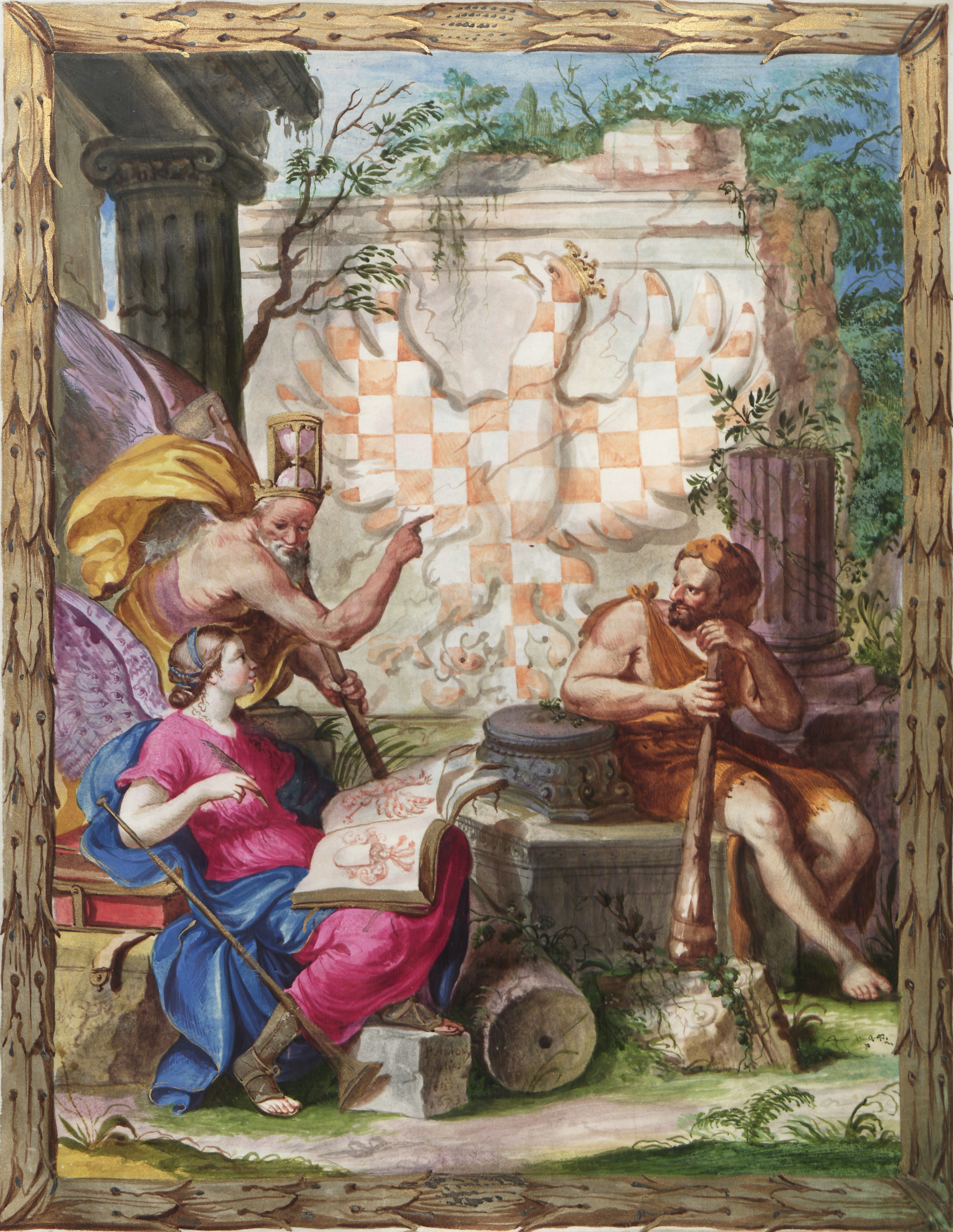
Illustration from Antonín Martin Lublinský 1671 Book of Knights. The Muse of Historiography Kleió for future generations captures the drawing and colors of the Moravian eagle. Chronos on the left, who is the personification of time in pre-Socratic philosophy and later literature, points to a red-and-white checkered eagle, which is its model, as observed by King Marobud on the right.

The change was not confirmed by George of Poděbrady and was never implemented, although the charter met all contemporary legal requirements. In 1628, the charter from 1462 appeared on a list of older privileges formally approved by Ferdinand II. It did not affect the Moravian coat of arms, as evidenced by parliamentary articles published until 1838 and provincial orders of 1545, 1562, 1604, and 1628.

The silver-and-red checkered eagle on a blue shield as the coat of arms of the Margraviate of Moravia was confirmed by imperial decrees during the second half of the 18th century and the first half of the 19th. If the change in color (from silver to gold was understood as a change in the emblem, the imperial decrees would have abolished the charter.

The coat of arms described in Frederick's charter was later misused by authors, politicians and political parties at the end of the 18th century and during the 19th; removing the colors corresponding to the Bohemian lion could disrupt state unity. The situation escalated after 1848.

== 19th century ==
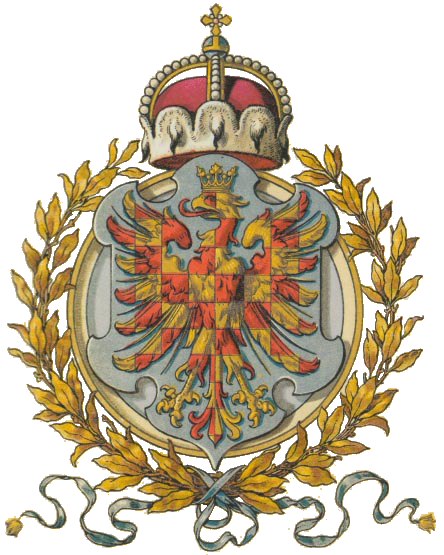
Unofficial coat of arms, painted by Hugo Gerard Ströhl

The two versions of the Moravian coat of arms became a problem during the 19th century. The silver-and-red chessboard eagle with a golden crown and armor on a blue shield was centuries old, and the charter of December 7, 1462, allowed its use by provincial authorities. The Moravian provincial administration gradually became aware of the charter during the 1830s and 1840s, which led to increased efforts to have the coat of arms recognized by the emperor. Although he did not recognize it until 1915, some Vienna authorities implied that the use of the red and gold checkered eagle was permitted.

== 20th century ==
Until 1915, the silver-and-red-checkered eagle was used in the large- and medium-sized coats of arms of Austria-Hungary. In October of that year, the chessboard of the Moravian eagle in the medium-sized coat of arms was officially changed from red-and-silver to red-and-gold.

This was the first time a separate coat of arms was created for Austria. Until then, the coat of arms of Austria-Hungary was used for Austria; in Hungary (the Lands of the Crown of Saint Stephen), the Hungarian coat of arms was used. The coat of arms was used from 1915 to 1918.

=== Czechoslovakia ===
After the creation of Czechoslovakia, the coat of arms of Moravia (which became part of the country's coat of arms) returned to a silver in chessboard. The mandatory use of silver and red was confirmed by the March 30, 1920 Constitutional Law 252/1920 of the Legal Code of the Czechoslovak Republic.

=== Czech Republic ===
The coat of arms of Moravia is part of the coat of arms of the Czech Republic, described in the State Symbols Act of the Czech Republic (Act 3/1993 of the legal code). The coat of arms represents the historical regions of Bohemia, Moravia, and Silesia.

Coat of arms of Czechoslovakia (1920–1939)

Coat of arms of the Czech Republic (1990–1992)

Coat of arms of the Czech Republic since 1992, by Jiří Louda

== 21st century ==
After their creation on Jan 1, 2000, each of the fourteen new regions of the Czech Republic obtained the right to ask Parliament to approve their coat of arms and their flag. The Subcommittee for Heraldry and Vexillology of the Chamber of Deputies recommended that the regions take into account their affiliation with their respective historical regions. The Bohemian lion was recommended for Bohemian regions, the Silesian eagle for the Moravian-Silesian region, and the Moravian eagle for Moravian regions and portions of regions. The Moravian eagle used in these coats of arms is a silver-and-red chequered eagle based on the coats of arms of the Kingdom of Bohemia and the Austro-Hungarian monarchy.

The coat of arms of the South Moravian Region has two eagles. The Moravian eagle is in the first field of the quartered shield, and a gold-and-red chessboard eagle with gold armour is in the fourth field.

=== Regional coats of arms ===
Pardubice Region

Vysočina Region

South Moravian Region

Olomouc Region

Moravian-Silesian Region

Zlín Region

== See also ==
- Flag of Moravia
- Coat of arms of Silesia
- Coat of arms of Czechoslovakia
- Coat of arms of Austria-Hungary
- Czech Wikipedia: Moravská orlice (Moravian eagle)
