= SK Moravská Slavia Brno =

- Full name: Sportovní klub Moravská Slavia-fotbal, z.s.
- Nickname: Morenda
- Founded: 1906
- Ground: Hlavní stadion ul. Vojtova
- Capacity: 3500
- Chairman: Marcel Hejna
- Manager: Libor Danihelka
- League: Regional Championship (South Moravia), 5th level
- 2023–23: 9th

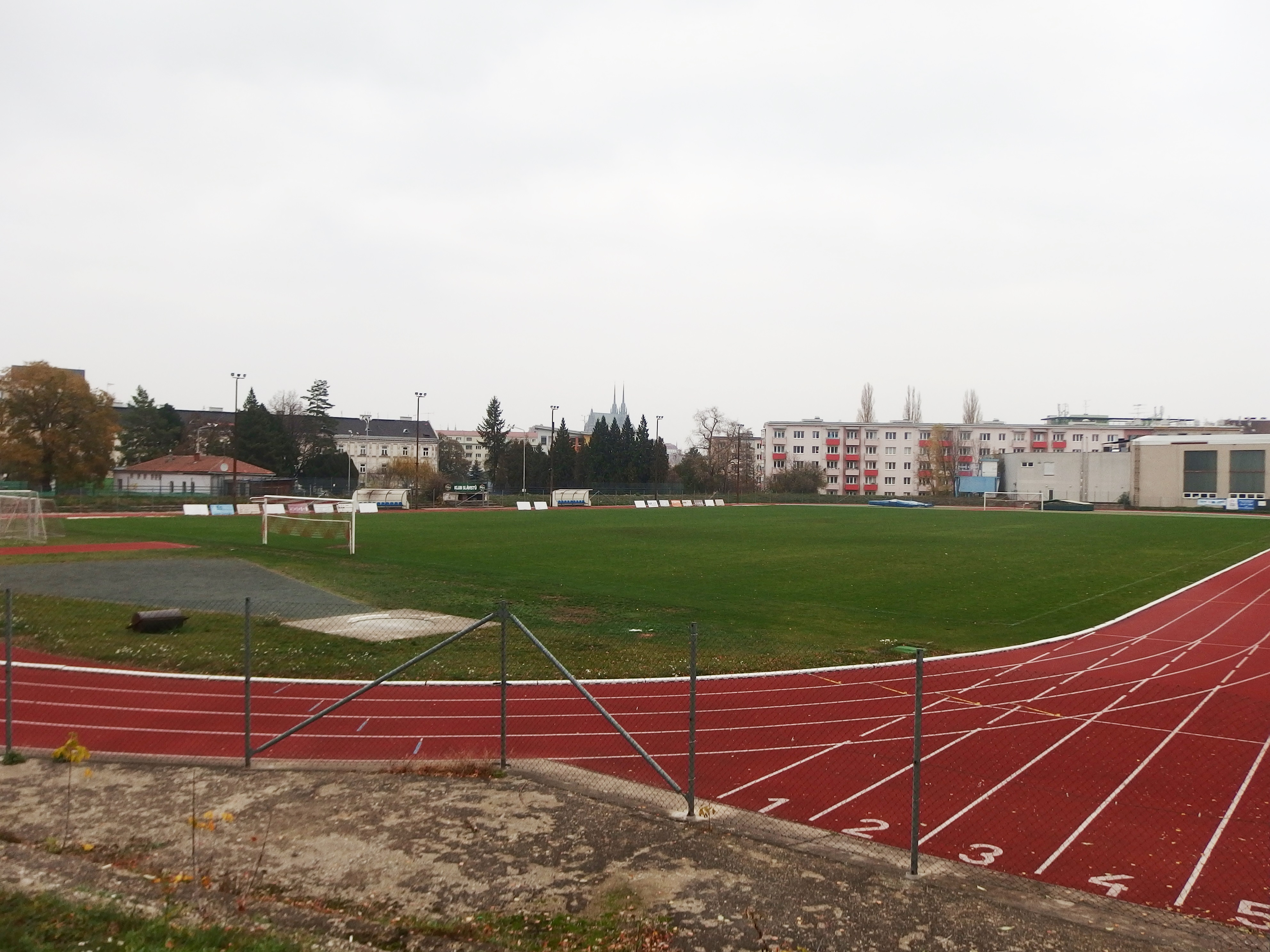
Brno, Vojtova, stadion

SK Moravská Slavia Brno is a football club located in the city of Brno in the South Moravian Region of the Czech Republic. The club currently plays in the South Moravian Regional Championship, the fifth tier of football in the Czech Republic.

The club played in the Czechoslovak First League, the top flight of Czechoslovak football, in the 1935–36 season, as well as the subsequent 1936–37 edition. The club managed just one win from 22 matches in its final season in the Czechoslovak First League. The club merged with Sokol GZ Královo Pole in 1949, ceasing to exist until its revival in 1965.

== Historical names ==
- Moravská Slavia (1906–1948)
- Sokol Moravská Slavia (1948)
- Moravská Slavia Brno (1965–)
