= SC Rusj Užhorod =

- Full name: Sport Klub Rusj Užhorod
- Founded: 15 August 1925; 100 years ago
- Dissolved: 1945; 80 years ago

SC Rusj Užhorod or SC Rusz Ungvár (Cyrillic: Русь Ужгород) is a former Czechoslovak and Hungarian club that was created in 1925–26 out of Magyar AC (1908). Ukrainian club Hoverla Uzhhorod later traced its heritage from this club indicating 1925 on its club's crest as the year of its foundation.

== Brief overview ==
Coat of arms of Carpathian Ruthenia

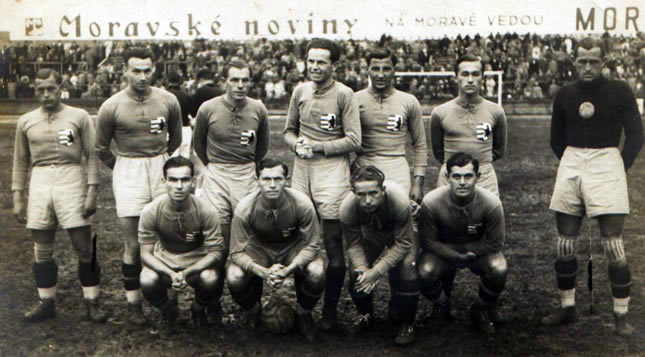
Football team of SC Rus with the Carpathian bear

The club was established on August 15, 1925. The colors of the club were chosen red and green, while the club's crest was the Coat of arms of Carpatho-Ukraine.

Its first game it played on June 4, 1926, against another club from Uzhhorod, ČsŠK Užhorod, and lost it 0:2. On May 31 and June 1, 1927, the club traveled to Lwów, Poland where it played against another local Ukrainian club Ukraina Lwów tying both games 3:3.

From 1929 the club participated in regional championships of Slovakia (1928 to 1934 as Eastern Slovakia and Carpatho-Ruthenia). It became a champion of Slovakia in 1933 and 1936. In 1933 Rusj Uzhorod lost a qualification play-off to DFC Prag (1:3, 1:4) to qualify for the Czechoslovak First League. Becoming the 1936 champion of Slovakia allowed Rus Uzhhorod to enter the 1936–37 Czechoslovak First League for a season. It was eliminated from it for the next season. During the World War II Rusj competed in the second football division of Hungary (Nemzeti Bajnokság II). After the war the club was formally dissolved, while many former players joined the football regional team of Zakarpattia for the Soviet Spartakiad competition.

The regional Zakarpattia team won the Soviet competition and was transformed into Spartak Uzhgorod which included players from all former clubs in the region.

Among the notable club's coaches there was Otto Mazal-Skvajn who during the World War II coached Wisla Krakow (1939–46). Among the notable club's players there was a Czechoslovak goalkeeper of Ukrainian (Ruthenian) origin Alexa Boksay (1911–2007).

== League history ==
=== Czechoslovakia ===
Season	Div.	Pos.	Pl.	W	D	L	GS	GA	P	Domestic Cup	Europe	Notes
1928–29	2nd	1							?			
1929–30	2nd	2							?			
1930–31	2nd	2							?			
1931–32	2nd	2							?			
1932–33	2nd	1							?			lost promotion playoff
1933–34	2nd	2							?			
1934–35	2nd	2							?			lost promotion playoff
1935–36	2nd	1	8	4	2	2	23	13	10			Promoted
1936–37	1st	11	22	3	2	17	24	79	8			Relegated
1937–38	2nd	?							?			
1938–39	games suspended due to military conflict											

=== Kingdom of Hungary ===
Season	Div.	Pos.	Pl.	W	D	L	GS	GA	P	Domestic Cup	Europe	Notes
1939–40	2nd "Highland"	6	30	17	2	11	68	56	36			
1940–41	2nd "Tisa"	9	26	11	4	11	57	53	26			
1941–42	2nd "Rákóczi"	7	26	12	3	11	51	64	27			
1942–43	2nd "Rákóczi"	7	22	8	5	9	38	39	21			
1943–44	2nd "North"	4	26	13	2	11	48	40	28			
1944–45	games suspended due to military conflict											

== Honors ==
Slovak championship (within Czechoslovakia)

- Winner: 1932–33
- Runner-up: 1928–29, 1933–34

East Slovakia and Ruthenia

- Winner: 1928–29, 1932–33, 1933–34

== See also ==
- Football league system in Czechoslovakia
