= 1936–37 Czechoslovak First League =

Czechoslovak First League
- Season: 1936–37
- Dates: 26 August 1936 – 17 May 1937
- Champions: Slavia Prague
- Relegated: SK Rusj Užhorod; SK Moravská Slavia Brno
- Top goalscorer: František Kloz (28 goals)

Statistics of Czechoslovak First League in the 1936–37 season.

== Overview ==
It was contested by 12 teams, and Slavia Prague won the championship. František Kloz was the league's top scorer with 28 goals.

== League standings ==
Pos	Team	Pld	W	D	L	GF	GA	GR	Pts
1	Slavia Prague (C)	22	17	4	1	86	23	3.739	38
2	Sparta Prague	22	14	3	5	74	29	2.552	31
3	SK Prostějov	22	14	1	7	56	37	1.514	29
4	1. ČsŠK Bratislava	22	11	5	6	44	36	1.222	27
5	SK Kladno	22	11	3	8	53	46	1.152	25
6	SK Plzeň	22	10	4	8	56	44	1.273	24
7	SK Židenice	22	11	2	9	41	52	0.788	24
8	SK Náchod	22	8	5	9	48	49	0.980	21
9	Viktoria Žižkov	22	6	8	8	47	40	1.175	20
10	Viktoria Plzeň	22	5	4	13	29	48	0.604	14
11	Rusj Užhorod (R)	22	3	2	17	24	79	0.304	8
12	Moravská Slavia Brno (R)	22	1	1	20	19	94	0.202	3

Source: rsssf.com
(C) Champions; (R) Relegated

== Results ==
Home \ Away	BRA	BRN	UŽH	KLA	NÁC	SKP	PRO	ŽID	SLA	SPA	PLZ	VŽI
1. ČsŠK Bratislava		3–1	6–0	2–1	1–3	2–2	2–0	3–0	1–1	1–3	2–1	2–0
Moravská Slavia Brno	0–3		1–3	0–3	0–5	1–7	2–3	0–1	0–1	2–3	2–4	2–4
Rusj Užhorod	1–3	5–0		1–5	2–2	0–5	2–5	1–1	0–2	1–5	0–2	0–5
SK Kladno	0–2	1–1	5–0		7–3	4–0	5–1	3–2	1–1	1–0	2–1	3–2
SK Náchod	1–1	4–1	3–1	3–2		2–3	3–2	1–2	3–3	0–4	3–0	3–0
SK Plzeň	4–0	6–0	3–1	3–5	5–3		2–4	2–3	1–6	1–2	1–0	1–1
SK Prostějov	4–0	6–1	3–1	3–0	2–0	1–2		3–1	0–5	6–1	2–0	0–4
SK Židenice	2–1	6–0	4–2	4–3	3–1	2–0	0–5		2–4	0–2	2–1	1–1
Slavia Prague	7–1	6–2	10–0	6–0	4–1	2–0	1–2	7–1		2–1	6–2	1–1
Sparta Prague	2–2	12–1	6–0	8–0	4–2	2–2	2–0	6–0	0–2		5–0	2–2
Viktoria Plzeň	2–2	1–2	1–0	2–1	1–1	1–1	2–3	2–3	1–5	3–1		1–1
Viktoria Žižkov	1–4	7–0	2–3	1–1	1–1	2–5	1–1	4–1	3–4	1–3	3–1	

Source: statistiky1ligy.fotbal.cz
Legend: Blue = home team win; Yellow = draw; Red = away team win.
