= Coat of arms of the Czech Republic =

Greater coat of arms of the Czech Republic

Versions
- Presidential version with the motto used on Czech Presidential Standard
- Armiger: Czech Republic
- Adopted: 17 December 1992
- Shield: Quarterly: first and fourth gules, a lion rampant queue fourchée argent armed, langued and crowned Or (Bohemia); second azure, an eagle displayed chequé gules and argent armed, membered langued and crowned Or (Moravia); third Or, an eagle displayed sable armed membered and langued gules crowned of the field and charged on the breast with a crescent terminating in trefoils at each end with issuing from the centrepoint a cross patée argent (Silesia).
- Compartment: The leaves of the linden tree and the red ribbon with the National Motto
- Motto: PRAVDA VÍTĚZÍ "TRUTH PREVAILS"
- Designer: Jiří Louda

Lesser coat of arms of the Czech Republic
- Armiger: Czech Republic
- Adopted: 17 December 1992
- Shield: Gules, a lion rampant queue forchée argent armed, langued and crowned Or (Czech lands)
- Designer: Jiří Louda

The coat of arms of the Czech Republic (Czech: Státní znak České republiky) is divided into two principal variants. The greater coat of arms has quarters representing the Czech lands, the three historical regions which make up the nation. The lesser coat of arms displays a silver double-tailed lion on a red shield. The current coats of arms, which was adopted in 1992, were designed by Czech heraldist Jiří Louda.

== Background ==
Bohemia and whole Czech lands

Moravia

Silesia

The arms of Bohemia show a silver double-tailed lion on a red background. This Bohemian Lion makes up the first and the fourth quarters of the greater coat of arms, so it is repeated in the shield. The Moravian red-and-silver chequered eagle is shown on a blue background. Between 1915 and 1918 the Moravian Eagle was chequered in the red-and-gold colors. The arms of Silesia is a black eagle with the clover stalk (lat. perisonium) in its breast on a golden background, although only a small south-eastern part of the historical region (Czech Silesia) belongs to the Czech Republic (the main part is now in Poland).

The rulers of Bohemia originally identified with a St. Wenceslas flaming eagle. In the 12th century, Emperor Frederick granted new arms to King Vladislaus II consisting of a silver lion on a red field, to symbolise his valor. The lion was at first represented with one tail. Later a second tail was added, for the help provided by the King Přemysl Otakar I fighting the Saxons (A legend from Dalimil's chronicle). During the first half of the 13th century the kings of Bohemia used a coat of arms bearing a black eagle in a silver shield. Red gonfanons had appeared earlier. From 1253 a two-tailed silver lion in a red field had been the coat of arms of the Kingdom of Bohemia. This lion was originally a sign of the Moravian margraves.

The oldest surviving full color depiction of the arms of Bohemia appears in the Passional of Abbes Cunegund from the 1310s. The Moravian Eagle was first documented on the seal of Ottokar's uncle, Margrave Přemysl (d. 1239). The Silesian Eagle stems from the ruling dynasty of the Piasts and was first applied by Duke Henry II the Pious (1238–1241). The shields also appeared on the emblems of the Crown of Bohemia established by Emperor Charles IV.

The greater shield was also used as the badge for the Czech national ice hockey team until 2018. The Czech national football team also featured it in their shirts, until being replaced with a newer, more streamlined badge featuring only the Bohemian lion, since the UEFA Euro 2012.

== Variants ==
=== Greater version ===
The greater coat of arms is blazoned in Czech law as follows:

A shield quartered: first and fourth gules, a lion rampant queue forchée argent armed, langued and crowned Or; second azure, an eagle displayed chequé gules and argent armed, langued and crowned Or; third Or, an eagle displayed sable armed and langued gules crowned of the field and charged on the breast with a crescent terminating in trefoils at each end with issuing from the centrepoint a cross patée argent.

=== Lesser version ===
The lesser coat of arms is blazoned in Czech law:

The lesser national coat of arms is a red shield, in it a silver double-tailed lion rampant with golden crown and golden armament.

== History ==
=== Czech lands ===
Original depictions:

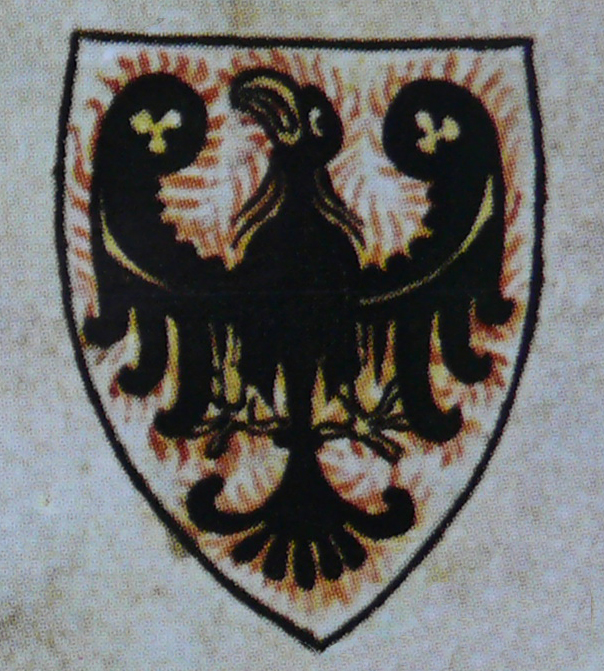
Přemyslid dynasty (Duchy of Bohemia)
Right: The earliest known colored coat of arms of Přemyslids depicted in the Passional of Abbes Kunigunde (1310s)

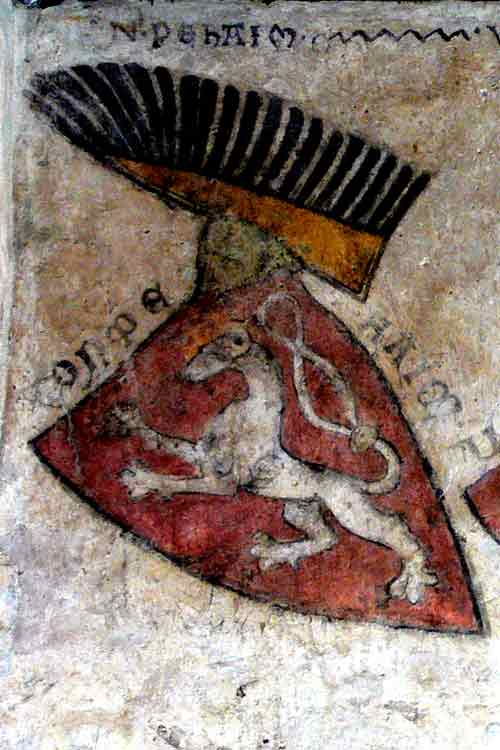
Kingdom of Bohemia (Royal Arms of Bohemia)
Right: The oldest depiction of coat of arms of Bohemia, castle Gozzoburg in Krems, fresco painting from the beginning of 1270s

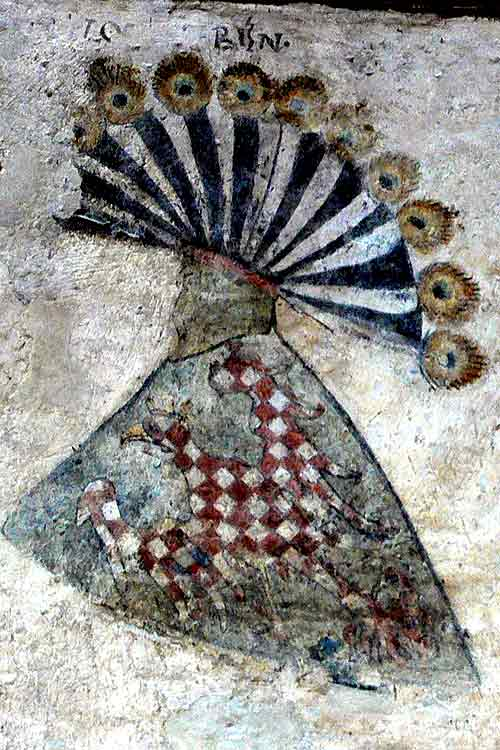
Right: The oldest depiction of coat of arms of Moravia, castle Gozzoburg in Krems, fresco painting from the beginning of 1270s

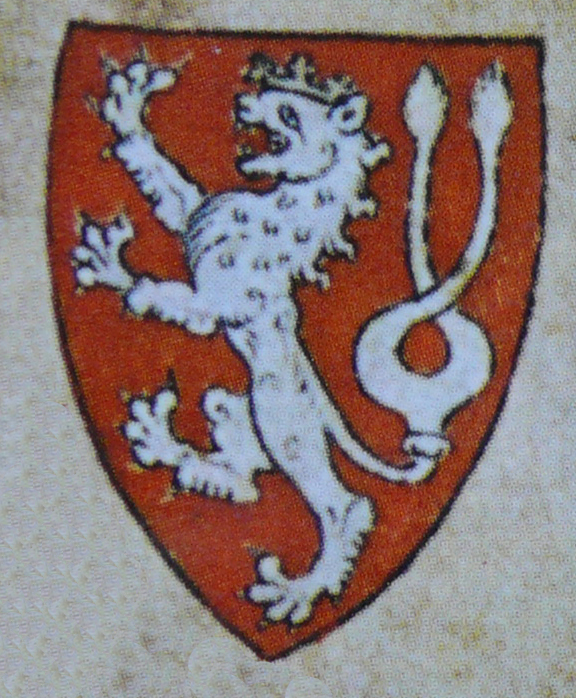
Lesser Royal Arms of Bohemia
Right: Colored coat of arms of Bohemia depicted in the Passional of Abbes Kunigunde (1310s)

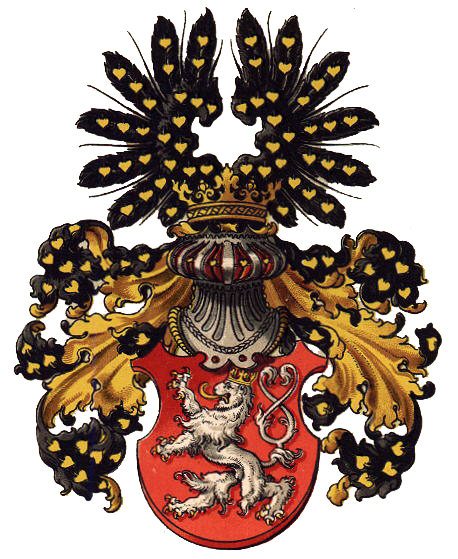
Royal Arms of Bohemia by Austrian heraldist Hugo Gerard Ströhl (1851–1919)

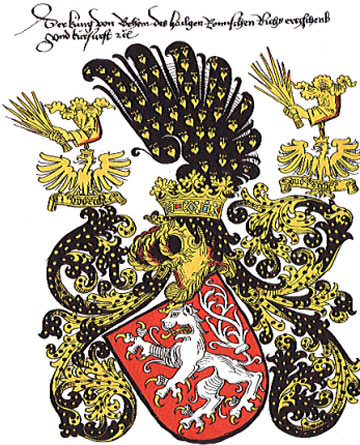
Kingdom of Bohemia
(Royal Arms of Bohemia)
Graphic versions:

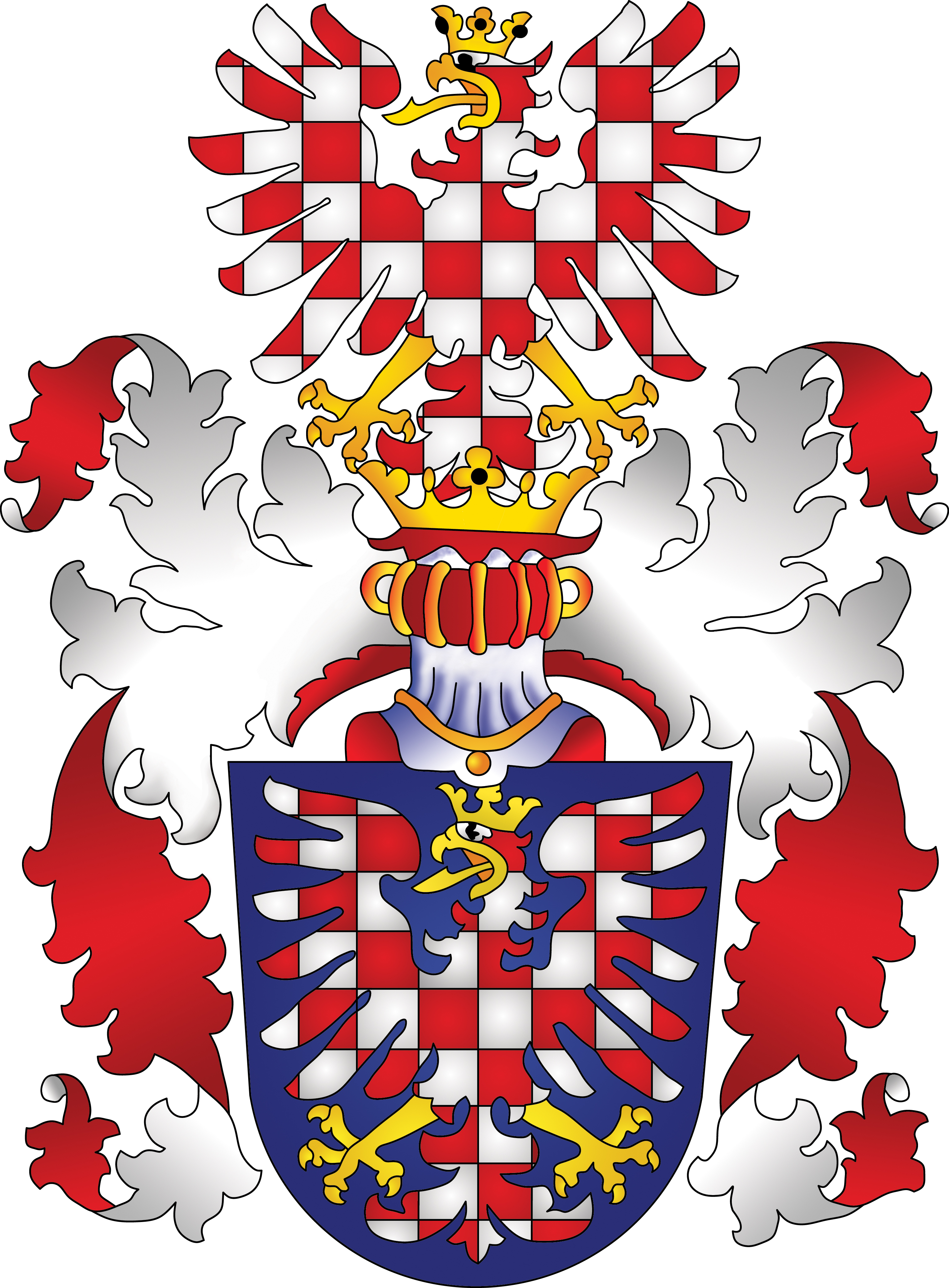
later form

=== Bohemian Crown lands ===
Original depictions:

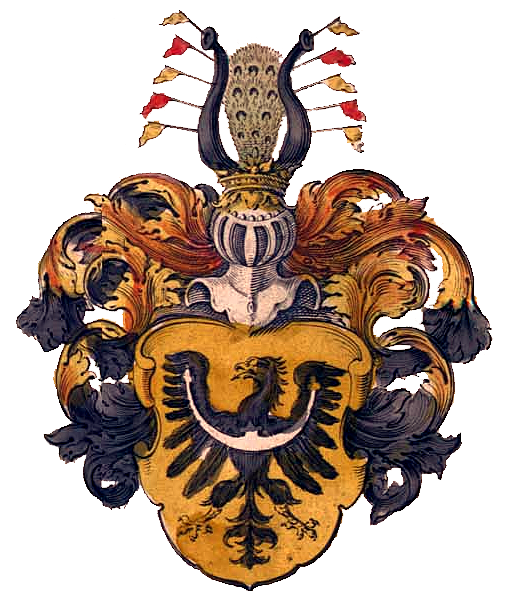
Duchies of Silesia
Graphic versions:

Lands of the Bohemian Crown
(simplified)

Lesser Royal Arms of Bohemia

Royal Arms of Bohemia with crown of Saint Wenceslas

=== Lands of the Bohemian Crown ===
Coat of arms of the Lands of the Bohemian Crown

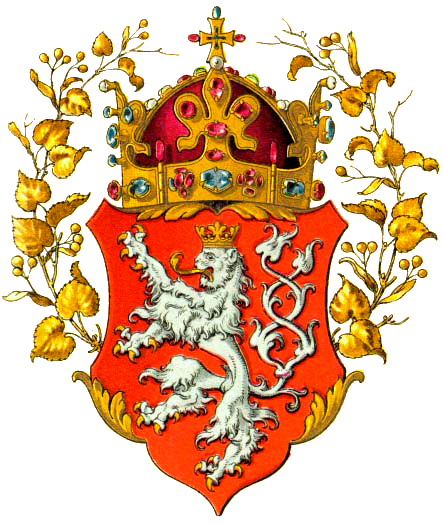
Coat of arms of the Kingdom of Bohemia

=== Czechoslovakia ===
Provisional coat of arms of Czechoslovakia (1919–1920)

Greater coat of arms of Czechoslovakia (1920–1960)

Middle coat of arms of Czechoslovakia (1920–1960)

Lesser coat of arms of Czechoslovakia (1920–1960)

Czechoslovakia (1960–1990)

Czechoslovakia (1990–1992)

=== Protectorate of Bohemia and Moravia ===
Greater coat of arms of the Protectorate of Bohemia and Moravia (1939–1945)

Lesser coat of arms of the Protectorate of Bohemia and Moravia (1939–1945)

=== Czech Republic ===
Greater coat of arms of the Czech Republic (1990–1992)

Lesser coat of arms of the Czech Republic (1990–1992)

== See also ==
- Coat of arms of Silesia
- Coat of arms of Czechoslovakia
- Coat of arms of Moravia
- Armorial of sovereign states
