= Coat of arms of Carpathian Ukraine =

Coat of arms of Carpathian Ruthenia. A derivative is used as the coat of arms of the Zakarpattia Oblast

The coat of arms of Carpatho-Ukraine is the official heraldic coat of arms of Zakarpattia Oblast in Ukraine. The coat of arms was initially adopted on 30 March 1920 along with coat of arms of other lands of Czechoslovakia. The Ukrainian version of the arms was adopted on 18 December 1990 as a revived coat of arms by Hungarian graphic artist Janos Reiti.

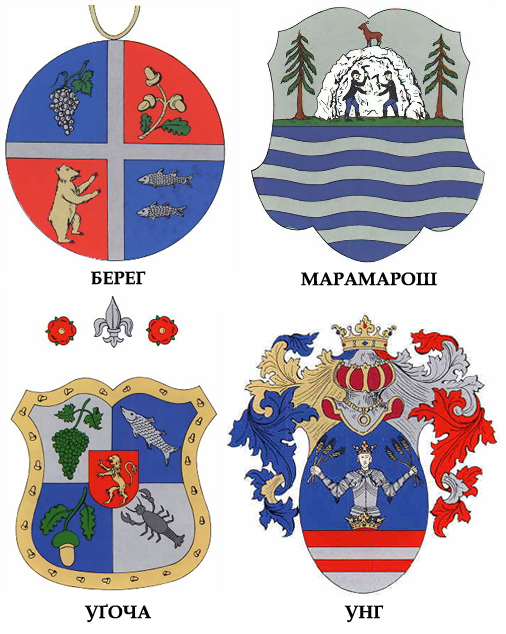
Coat of arms of four counties of Kingdom of Hungary in Carpathian (Bereg, Máramaros, Ugocsa, Ung)

The flag of the Zakarpattia Oblast is a Ukrainian flag defaced with the coat of arms of Carpathian Ukraine.

== History ==
The coat of arms were created after the end of the First World War, when local councils of Eperjes, Ung, Huszt of the region of Carpathian Ruthenia signed memorandum on leaving the First Hungarian Republic following Bolshevik coup-d'état led by Béla Kun and joining the newly created state of Czechoslovakia as an autonomous land. The arms was designed by Gustav Friedrich, a head of heraldic commission of the Czechoslovak government. During negotiations with the central government in Prague as the representatives of Ruthenian political elite were not able to arrive to final conclusion, creation of the coat of arms was directed to specialists in heraldry in Prague. A technical task for development of emblem however anticipated, possibly, to consider wish of local political elite of the land. The Rusyn community firmly was standing on positions that were adopted back at the First Slavic Congress in Prague that took place during the 1848 Spring of Nations about the use of "Pan-Slavic" colors: blue, white, and red, while the supporters of Uniate (Greek Catholic) clergy were standing on position of use blue-yellow colors. Therefore, professor Gustav Friedrich presented a compromised decision. That is, by using the four main colors, to offer an emblem "with an image of a bear which earlier was depicted on coat of arms of Uzhhorod city".

The arms is parted per pale show three gold bars on blue field in its first (dexter) field and a red bear rampant on silver in its second (sinister) field. In 1924 Czech professor Irži Kralj, a specialist of ethnography expressed his opinion that the bear is a symbol for the Carpathian wildlife (fauna). For sometime it was thought that professor Friedrich was mistaken about existence of bear in heraldry of Uzhhorod or its vicinities, yet in 1991 a Polish economist Andrzej Wociał who was interested in history of wars proposed a version that bear may have derived from old heraldry of Peter Petrovics coat of arms who was an overlord of Zemplin and Ung in the 14th century. There also was found an old seal from Ung county (megye) belonging to village of Kostrino which starts with inscriptions "Ung. M." and then another "Kostrina". On the Kostrino village seal is depicted a bear rampant. On the coat of arms of Bereg County is also depicted a bear rampant, but it is a bear rampant to sinister ("facing left").

The arms were also used by the short-lived state of Carpatho-Ukraine in 1939, but with the addition of the Ukrainian trident in the uppermost blue field, used previously by the Ukrainian People's Republic. The idea of adding the seal of St. Volodymyr the Great came from Dr. Stefan Rosocha, a native of Maramoros.

Since the territory is the same for the current Zakarpattia Oblast, the oblast uses the arms as its own.

== Gallery ==
=== Coats of arms ===
In the interwar years, the arms were part of the coat of arms of Czechoslovakia

The coat of arms of Carpatho-Ukraine in 1939

The coat of arms of the Rusyns

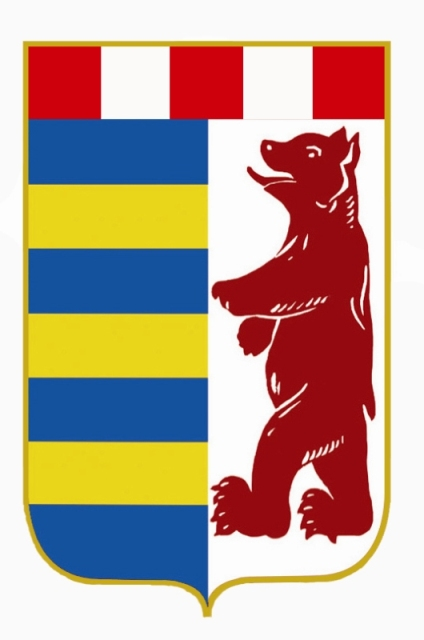
The coat of arms of Rusyns in Croatia

The coat of arms of the Zakarpattia Oblast, adopted in 1990

=== Flags ===
The flag of the Zakarpattia Oblast is a Ukrainian flag defaced with the coat of arms

The flag of "Subcarpathian Ruthenia-Zakarpattia" (Rusyn organization in Ukraine) with the coat of arms
