= Jasenná (Náchod District) =

- Municipality
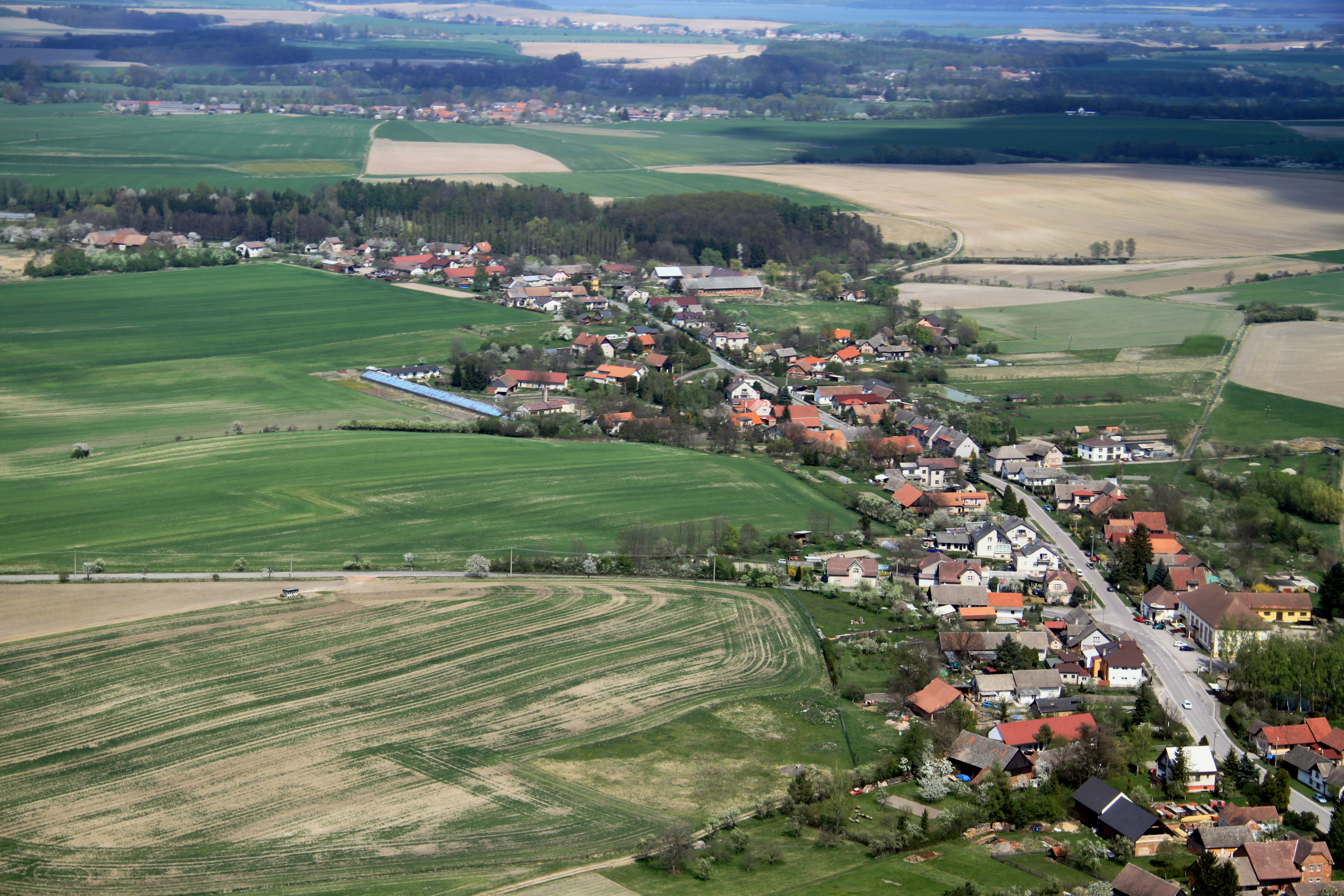
- Aerial view

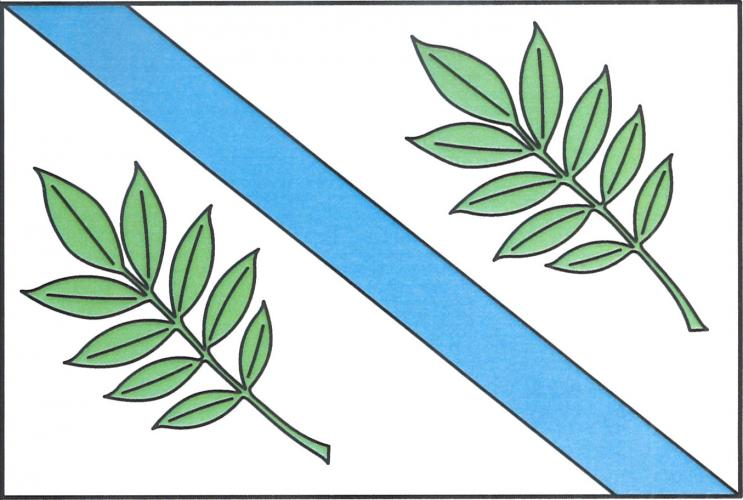
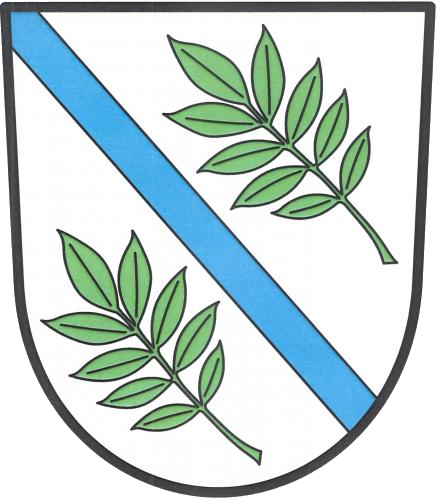
- Flag Coat of arms

- Location in the Czech Republic
- Coordinates: 50°19′6″N 15°59′28″E
- Country: Czech Republic
- Region: Hradec Králové
- District: Náchod
- First mentioned: 1305

Area
  - Total: 12.74 km^{2} (4.92 sq mi)
- Elevation: 270 m (890 ft)

Population (2026-01-01)
  - Total: 722
  - Density: 56.7/km^{2} (147/sq mi)
- Time zone: UTC+1 (CET)
  - Summer (DST): UTC+2 (CEST)
- Postal code: 552 22
- Website: www.obec-jasenna.cz

Jasenná is a municipality and village in Náchod District in the Hradec Králové Region of the Czech Republic. It has about 700 inhabitants.

== Demographics ==
Historical population
| Year | Pop. | ±% |
|---|---|---|
| 1869 | 1,180 | — |
| 1880 | 1,360 | +15.3% |
| 1890 | 1,317 | −3.2% |
| 1900 | 1,257 | −4.6% |
| 1910 | 1,354 | +7.7% |
| 1921 | 1,352 | −0.1% |
| 1930 | 1,193 | −11.8% |
| 1950 | 912 | −23.6% |
| 1961 | 894 | −2.0% |
| 1970 | 809 | −9.5% |
| 1980 | 764 | −5.6% |
| 1991 | 695 | −9.0% |
| 2001 | 696 | +0.1% |
| 2011 | 695 | −0.1% |
| 2021 | 736 | +5.9% |
Source: Censuses
