= Coat of arms of Czechoslovakia =

- Greater coat of arms (1920–1960)

Versions
- Socialist emblem (1960–1990)

- Lesser coat of arms (1920–1960)
- Adopted: 1919; 1920; 1960; 1990

The coat of arms of Czechoslovakia were changed many times during Czechoslovakia’s history, some alongside each other. This reflects the turbulent history of the country and a wish to use appropriate territorial coats of arms.

== In creation of Czechoslovakia ==
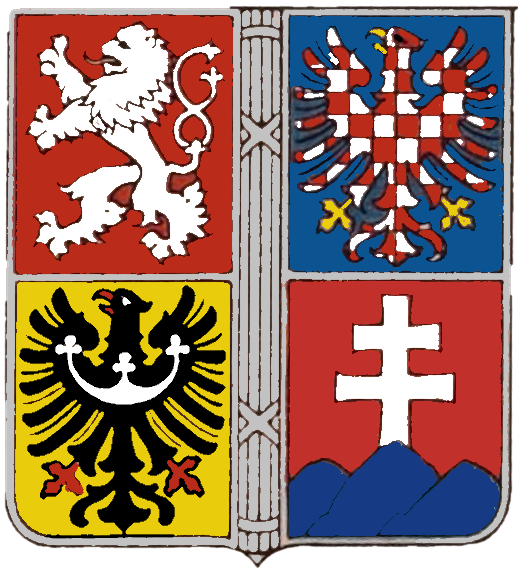
Coat of arms of the Czechoslovak National Council in Paris before creation of Czechoslovakia. (1916–1918).

Motive from emblem of the Czechoslovak Legion was used as unofficial coat of arms of Czechoslovakia in (1918–1920).

Coat of arms of Czechoslovakia (1919–1920).

== First (1918–1938), Second (1938–1939) and Post-War Czechoslovak Republic (1945–1960) ==
Lesser coat of arms of Czechoslovakia (1920–1939) and (1945–1960).	Middle coat of arms of Czechoslovakia (1920–1939) and (1945–1960). (Note: Middle coat of arms were in minimal use since 1945.)	Greater coat of arms of Czechoslovakia (1920–1939) and (1945–1960). (Note: Greater coat of arms were in minimal use since 1945.)

Three variants of the coat of arms of Czechoslovakia were adopted in 1920 along with the Czechoslovak Constitution of 1920. After the creation of the Second Czechoslovak Republic in 1938 all versions legally remained official, although state power and the government chiefly used the middle version, to emphasize the new autonomous federal regime and abandonment of the concept of Czechoslovakism. The middle arms were effectively put out of use when Germany occupied Bohemia and Moravia and an independent Slovakia were established. When Czechoslovakia was re-established in 1945 at the end of the Second World War, all three versions were re-established, but the lesser coat of arms became the primarily used version. The middle version was not used afterwards.

The smaller arms were in essence the arms of Bohemia (Čechy) superimposed with the arms of Slovakia (Slovensko). The Slovak arms should not be seen as a Herzschild but as a shield carried by the Bohemian lion in the larger motif. It is thus not to be seen as an inescutcheon taking up the honorary heart position in the arms. As can be seen in the image, it is also not placed in the visual centre of the arms.

The middle arms on the other hand, had one shield in the heart position, the arms of Bohemia. The main shield also held the arms of Slovakia, Carpathian Ruthenia, Moravia, and Silesia.

The greater arms consisted of the same fields as in the middle arms completed with three more arms: the arms of the region of Těšín Silesia and the historical duchies of Opava and Ratibor. The greater arms also had two lions as supporters and the national motto. In the region of Slovakia the motto was changed to the Slovak version: Pravda víťazí. in all other regions including Bohemia, Moravia-Silesia and Subcarpathian Rus' the Czech version was used.

== Occupied Czechoslovakia (1938–1945) ==
Lesser coat of arms of the Protectorate of Bohemia and Moravia.

Greater coat of arms of the Protectorate of Bohemia and Moravia.

Coat of arms of the Reichsgau Sudetenland.

Coat of arms of the World War II Slovak Republic.

Coat of arms used in Hungarian-annexed territories (Upper Hungary and Subcarpathia).

Poland annexed territories added into Silesian Voivodeship and Kraków Voivodeship (1938–1939)

Czechoslovak government-in-exile (1939–1945)

== Czechoslovak Socialist Republic (1960–1990) ==
Coat of arms of Czechoslovakia (1960–1990)	Coat of arms of Slovakia (1960–1990) (de facto)

Czechoslovakia had a Communist regime from 1948, but this initially retained the smaller coat of arms of 1920 and did not adopt an emblem in the form of so-called "socialist heraldry" so popular in most other countries influenced by the Soviet Union. In 1960 however, the arms were redesigned in the form of a pavise, a form of shield seldom used in heraldry, originally intended to stand on the ground and protect foot soldiers rather than the usual knight's shield. This type of shield was associated with the Hussites in Czech history, whose rebellion was interpreted as proto-communist revolutionary movement by the state-sanctioned Marxist historiography. Above the Bohemian lion, the red star of Communism replaced the crown and the arms of Slovakia, still carried by the lion, was totally remade, removing the cross in favour of the fire of partisans and the trimount was replaced with a naturalistic silhouette of the Kriváň mountain.

== Czech and Slovak Federative Republic (1990–1992) ==
Coat of arms of Czechoslovakia (1990–1992).	Lesser coat of arms of the Czech Republic (1990–1992). Greater coat of arms of the Czech Republic (1990–1992).	Coat of arms of the Slovak Republic (1990–1992).

Following the fall of Communism in 1989, traditional heraldry was reinstated and new national arms were designed, quartering the arms of Bohemia and Slovakia. These arms were valid until Czechoslovakia was dissolved during the new year period of 1992/93.

== Post-Czechoslovak coats of arms ==
Greater coat of arms of the Czech Republic. In the upper dexter and the lower sinister quarters are the lion of Bohemia, in the upper sinister the Moravian chequered eagle, in the lower dexter the black Silesian eagle.

Lesser coat of arms of the Czech Republic include the Bohemian/Czech lion with two tails.

Coat of arms of Slovakia, a double-cross elevated on the middle peak of a dark blue mountain consisting of three peaks.

The Coat of arms of Carpathian Ukraine, a territory of Ukraine (ceded to the Soviet Union from Czechoslovakia after World War II). Adopted on 30 March 1920 by an act of the Czechoslovak parliament, used to this day, now by Zakarpattia Oblast.
