= Moravian National Community =

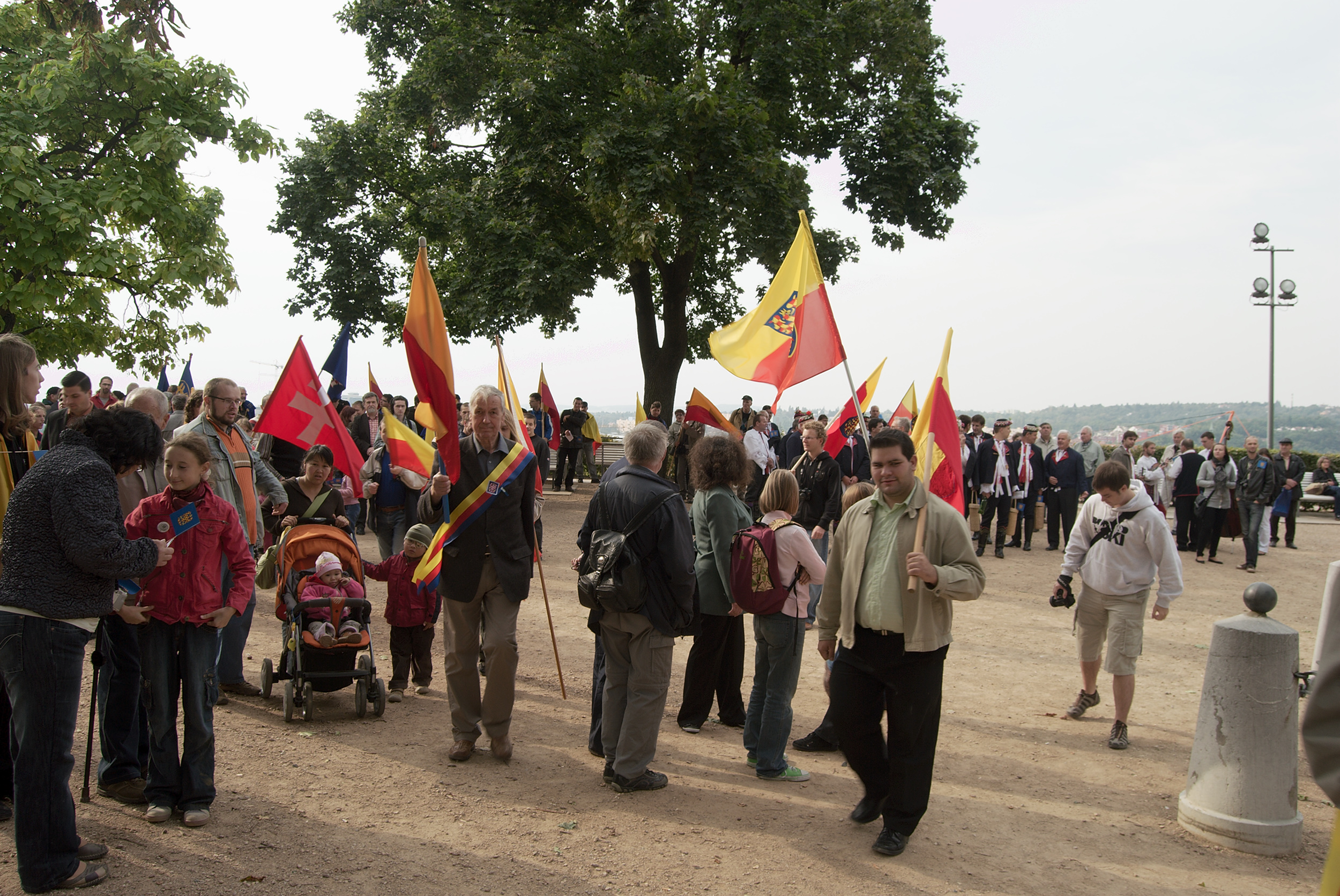
Participants of the Annual March of Moravians, held by the Moravian National Community on 25 September 2010, gathered in Denis Gardens, Brno

The Moravian National Community (Czech: Moravská národní obec) is a non-political civic association focused on Moravian culture, history, traditions and Moravia in general. In practice, however, it also strives to achieve certain political goals, e.g. the restoration of a legislative body for the Moravian territory. The community was founded in October 1990 in Brno as the successor of the former Moravia's Friends' Association (Czech: Klub přátel Moravy), which had existed since 1985. The MNC has achieved that the Moravian flag was flown at some of the municipal buildings as well as at the regional office of the South Moravian Region. It also organizes Moravian patriots' marches or cultural events.
