= Gelnhausen Codex =

15th-century manuscript

- Jihlava, Czech Republic
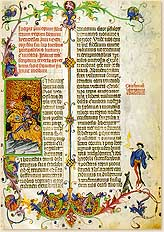
- Date: ca. 1400–1408
- Place of origin: Jihlava, Bohemia
- Language: Latin
- Author: Johannes Von Gelnhausen
- Material: Parchment

The Gelnhausen Codex (Czech Kodex Gelnhausenův) is an early 15th-century manuscript compiled by Johannes of Gelnhausen, city scribe of Iglau (Jihlava). It is preserved in the city archive of Jihlava, Czech Republic. It is an important source of 14th-century Czech history.

== Literature ==
- Michael Simboeck: Der Codex Gelnhausen und seine Miniaturen. Iglau 1903, urn:nbn:de:bvb:824-dtl-0000040342.
- Dietrich W. Poeck: Rituale der Ratswahl. Zeichen und Zeremoniell der Ratssetzung in Europa (12–18 Jahrhundert). (= Städteforschung. Veröffentlichungen des Instituts für vergleichende Städtegeschichte in Münster. Reihe A: Darstellungen; Bd. 60), Böhlau, Köln/Weimar/Wien 2003, ISBN 3-412-18802-6.
- Zum Jubiläum des Codex Gelnhausen 1405–2005. Iglau 2005.
