= Jiří Louda =

Czech heraldist (1920-2015)

Jiří Louda (3 October 1920 – 1 September 2015) was a Czech heraldist and veteran of World War II. Louda was considered among the leading designers of coats of arms in the Czech Republic and the former Czechoslovakia. He designed the current coat of arms of the Czech Republic, adopted in 1992, which incorporates the displays of the three historic Czech lands. Louda also designed the standard (official presidential flag) of President of the Czech Republic, which was adopted in 1993 following the country's independence. Additionally, Louda created the coat of arms of the Olomouc Region, as well as the municipal coats of arms for more than 200 towns and cities throughout the Czech Republic.

Louda was born in Kutná Hora, Czechoslovakia, on 3 October 1920. He fled to the United Kingdom during World War II and the Nazi occupation of Czechoslovakia, where the Czechoslovak government-in-exile was headquartered. He joined the exiled Czechoslovak military during World War II and served as a paratrooper.

He was imprisoned by the Czechoslovak Communist regime during the late 1940s, and released in 1950.

He is best known in the English-speaking world to students of royal and noble genealogies and royal families as co-author with Michael Maclagan (who wrote the text, while Louda compiled and drew the tables) of the best-selling Lines of Succession, first published in 1981, and subsequently reprinted and revised on several occasions.

Jiří Louda died in Olomouc on 1 September 2015, at the age of 94.

== Arms ==
Coat of arms of Jiři Louda
Crest Out of a ducal coronet Or, a sword erect argent hilted Or between two wings Gules Escutcheon Gules a fess between in chief a mullet of six points Argent between two lions passant guardant Or and in base a winged parachute Argent. Pendant from the shield the Czechoslovak War Cross 1939 and the Czech Medal for Military Merit Motto Quo fas et gloria ducunt

== Publications ==
- With Michael Maclagan. Lines of Succession: Heraldry of the Royal Families of Europe. London: Orbis & New York: Clarkson Potter, 1981; revised and updated edition, 1991; adapted small-format edition, 2002. (The 1981 American edition was published as Heraldry of the Royal Families of Europe, but later editions took the European title.)
