= Jasenná (Zlín District) =

- Municipality
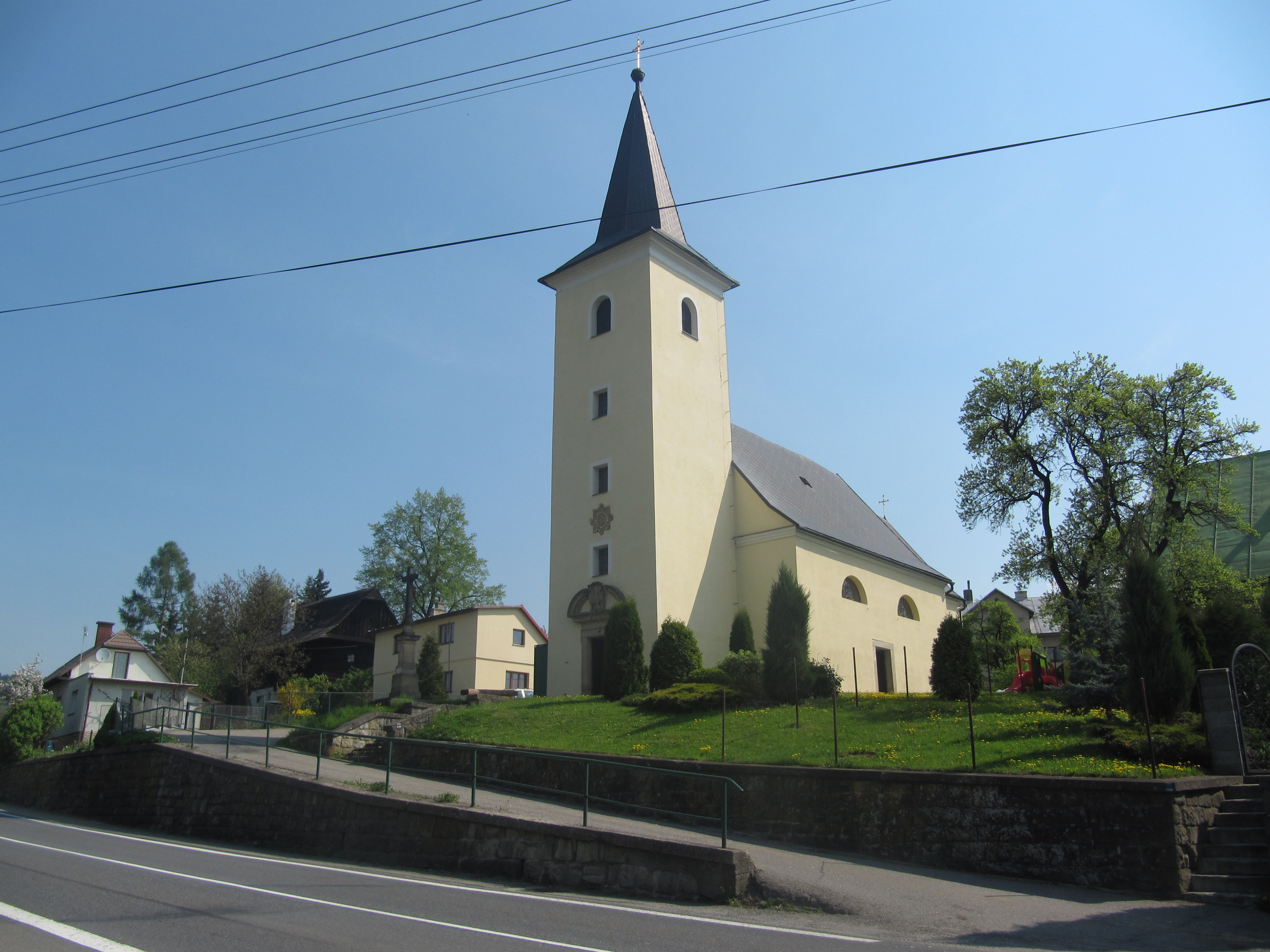
- Church of Saint Mary Magdalene

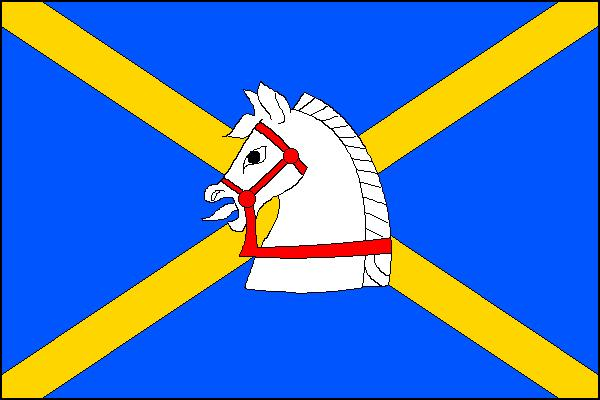
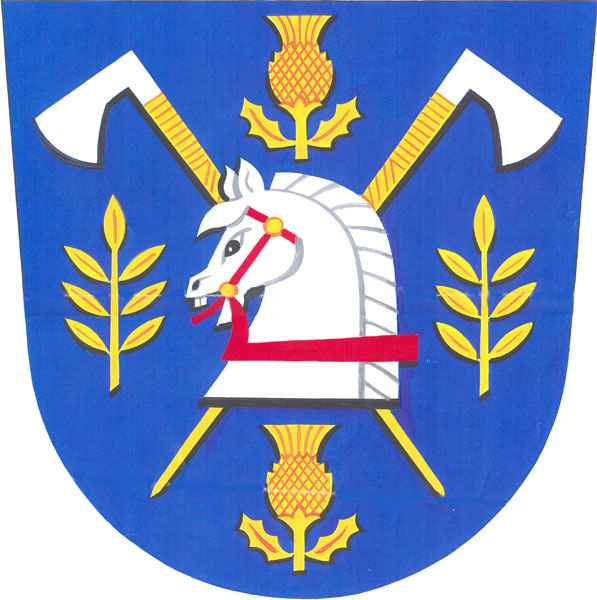
- Flag Coat of arms

- Location in the Czech Republic
- Coordinates: 49°15′12″N 17°53′39″E
- Country: Czech Republic
- Region: Zlín
- District: Zlín
- First mentioned: 1468

Area
  - Total: 12.36 km^{2} (4.77 sq mi)
- Elevation: 365 m (1,198 ft)

Population (2026-01-01)
  - Total: 956
  - Density: 77.3/km^{2} (200/sq mi)
- Time zone: UTC+1 (CET)
  - Summer (DST): UTC+2 (CEST)
- Postal code: 763 12
- Website: www.jasenna.eu

Jasenná is a municipality and village in Zlín District in the Zlín Region of the Czech Republic. It has about 1,000 inhabitants.

Jasenná lies approximately 17 kilometres (11 mi) east of Zlín and 267 km (166 mi) east of Prague.

== Demographics ==
Historical population
Year	Pop.	±%
1869	723	—
1880	790	+9.3%
1890	785	−0.6%
1900	822	+4.7%
1910	843	+2.6%
1921	892	+5.8%
1930	858	−3.8%
1950	858	+0.0%
1961	944	+10.0%
1970	872	−7.6%
1980	867	−0.6%
1991	913	+5.3%
2001	913	+0.0%
2011	916	+0.3%
2021	897	−2.1%
Source: Censuses

== Notable people ==
- Jakub Plšek (born 1993), footballer
