= List of flags of Europe =

A map of Europe with national flags

This is a list of international, national and subnational flags used in Europe.

== Supranational and international flags ==
An incomplete list of flags representing intra-European international and supranational organisations, which omits intercontinental organisations such as the United Nations:

Flag	Date	Use	Description
	1957–1958	Flag of the Benelux	Combines features from the flags of the member countries: Belgium, the Netherlands, and Luxembourg.
	?–2015	Flag of the Central Commission for Navigation on the Rhine	
	2015–present	Flag of the Central Commission for Navigation on the Rhine	
	1990–present	Flag of the Central European Free Trade Agreement (CEFTA)	
	1991–present	Flag of the Commonwealth of Independent States	The flag of the Commonwealth of Independent States is blue with the emblem of the organisation in the centre.
	1955–	Flag of the Council of Europe	A circle of twelve upward-oriented five-pointed golden stars centred on a blue field: represents the continent beyond the organisations as the Flag of Europe.
	1986–present (Note: The European Parliament adopted the Council of Europe's flag in 1983.)	Flag of the European Union (Note: Adopted by the European Communities in 1986, which became the European Union in 1992, continuing its usage.)	A circle of twelve upward-oriented five-pointed golden stars centred on a blue field: represents the continent beyond the organisations as the Flag of Europe.
	1973–1983	Flag of the European Parliament	
	1984–present	Flag of the Nordic Council	White stylised swan in a white circle upon a blue background.
	1953–present	Flag of the North Atlantic Treaty Organization	A dark blue field charged with a white compass rose emblem from which radiate four white lines.
	2006–present	Flag of the European Gendarmerie Force	
	2006–present	Flag of the European Maritime Force	

== Flags of European sovereign states ==
Flag	Date	Use	Description
	1912–1946; 2002–present	Flag of Albania; See also: List of Albanian flags	The flag of Albania, adopted in April 1912, is a red flag with a black double-headed eagle in the centre. It is derived from the seal of Gjergj Kastriot Skanderbeg, a 15th-century Albanian who led a revolt against the Ottoman Empire that resulted in brief independence for Albania from 1443 to 1478.
	1866–present	Flag of Andorra; See also: List of Andorran flags	The flag of Andorra, adopted in 1866, is a tricolour of blue, yellow, and red with the coat of arms of Andorra in the centre. It is based on the flags of France and Catalonia. The coat of arms of Andorra is partially based on the flag of Catalonia (four red ribbons on yellow background).
	1918–1920; 1991–present	Flag of Armenia; See also: List of Armenian flags (Note: Part of the Caucasus region, at the crossroads of Europe and Asia, the boundaries of which may vary based on definition. Physiographically, Armenia may be considered to fall entirely in Western Asia, whereas Georgia and Azerbaijan are at times deemed transcontinental states spanning both Europe and Asia.)	After gaining independence, the First Republic of Armenia adopted the modern Armenian tricolour. The independent Armenian government selected the colours used during the last period of the Rubenid Dynasty: red, blue, and orange. The red emblematizes the Armenian Highland, the Armenian people's continued struggle for survival, maintenance of the Christian faith, and Armenia's independence and freedom. The blue emblematizes the will of the people of Armenia to live beneath peaceful skies. The orange emblematizes the creative talent and hard-working nature of the people of Armenia.
	1918–1938; 1945–present	Flag of Austria; See also: List of Austrian flags	Originally adopted in 1918, it was again officially adopted in 1945, after being banned during World War II. Stripes of red and white have been a collective emblem of Austria for over 800 years, and they were first used on the flag in 1191. According to long-established legend, the red and white flag was designed to resemble the bloodstained white coat worn by the Duke of Austria during a fierce battle.
	1918–1920; 1991–present	Flag of Azerbaijan; See also: List of Azerbaijani flags	Originally adopted in 1918 as a flag of the Democratic Republic of Azerbaijan, it was officially adopted again in 1991, after Azerbaijan gained its independence. The flag of Azerbaijan is the national ensign of Azerbaijan. It consists of three equal horizontal bands coloured blue, red, and green, with a white crescent and an eight-pointed star centred in the red band. The blue band refers to Turkic heritage, the red is for progress and Europeanisation and the green refers to Islam.
	1995; 2012–present	Flag of Belarus; See also: List of Belarusian flags	Belarus's flag was officially adopted on 10 February 2012. The dominant red-green bicolour was used on its flag when it was a republic within the former Soviet Union. The woven fabric ornament at the hoist uses traditional Belarusian red and white colours.
	1830–present	Flag of Belgium; See also: List of Belgian flags	Black, gold and red are symbolic of the country's coat of arms. The three-striped vertical layout was inspired by the French Tricolour. Black and gold were chosen, being the colours of the Duchy of Brabant where the Belgian Revolution started. Red was added as a symbol of the blood spilled during the uprising.
	1998–present	Flag of Bosnia and Herzegovina; See also: List of flags of Bosnia and Herzegovina	The flag of Bosnia and Herzegovina consists of a wide medium blue vertical band on the fly side with a yellow isosceles triangle abutting the band and the top of the flag. The remainder of the flag is medium blue with seven five-pointed white stars and two half stars top and bottom along the hypotenuse of the triangle. The three points of the triangle stand for the three nations of Bosnia: Bosniaks, Croats, and Serbs. It is said to represent the map of Bosnia.
	1878–1947; 1991–present	Flag of Bulgaria; See also: List of Bulgarian flags	The flag of Bulgaria was adopted in 1989 and consists of three horizontal bands of white, green, and red.
Flag of Croatia	1990–present	Flag of Croatia; See also: List of Croatian flags	The flag of Croatia, adopted in December 1990, consists of three equal horizontal stripes of red, white, and blue and the coat of arms of Croatia in the centre.
	1960; 2006–present	Flag of Cyprus; See also: List of Cypriot flags (Note: The island of Cyprus, which includes the Republic of Cyprus, Northern Cyprus and Akrotiri and Dhekelia, is geographically located in Asia, closer to Asian Turkey than to the European mainland. However, the Republic of Cyprus is a member state of the European Union.)	The flag was officially adopted on 16 August 1960. The island is depicted in a copper shade representative of its name: the name Cyprus has roots in the Sumerian word for copper (zubar), from the large deposits of copper found on the island. The crossed green olive branches symbolise the hope for peace between the Turks and the Greeks. It was designed by İsmet Güney, a Turkish Cypriot painter.
	1920–present	Flag of the Czech Republic; See also: List of Czech flags	The first flag of Czechoslovakia was white over red, and those colours are the heraldic colours of Bohemia. The blue triangle was added to the flag to distinguish it from the flag of Poland, and blue is said to represent the State of Moravia.
	1219–present	Flag of Denmark; See also: List of Danish flags	The world's oldest state flag still in use. Legend has it that it appeared as a sign from heaven to King Valdemar II in 1219. Known as the Dannebrog ("Danish Cloth"), this blood-red flag with an off-centred white cross (a "Nordic cross") became a model for other regional flags.
	1918–1940; 1990–present	Flag of Estonia; See also: List of Estonian flags	Officially re-adopted on 8 May 1990. The story of the flag begins on 17 September 1881, when the constituent Assembly of the first Estonian national student Corps "Vironia" (modern Estonian Students Society) in the city of Tartu was also identified in colour; it later became national. The first flag was made in 1884 and this tricolour was accepted in 1918 as the national flag of Estonia. The original flag is still in existence. The first flag of Estonia is kept in Tartu Estonian National Museum. Blue represents loyalty, and the country's beautiful blue skies, seas, and lakes; black is symbolic of past oppression and the fertile soil; and white represents virtue, winter snows, and Estonia's long struggle for freedom and independence.
	1918–present	Flag of Finland; See also: List of Finnish flags	Officially adopted on 29 May 1918. The off-centred blue cross is based on the Nordic cross, widely used on Nordic national flags. The blue colour is symbolic of blue skies, and the thousands of lakes in Finland. The white represents the winter snows.
	1794–1814; 1830–present	Flag of France; See also: List of French flags	Officially adopted on 15 February 1794. The tricolore consists of three vertical bands of equal width, displaying the country's national colours: blue, white, and red. The blue band is positioned nearest the flagstaff, the white in the middle, and the red on the outside. Red, white, and blue have come to represent liberty, equality, and fraternity—the ideals of the French Revolution. Blue and red are also the time-honoured colours of Paris, while white is the colour of the Royal House of Bourbon.
	2004–present	Flag of Georgia; See also: List of Georgian flags	This recently adopted flag is a simple white rectangle, with a central red cross connecting all four sides of the flag; in each of the four corners is a small red cross. The flag is based on a historic five-cross design that dates back to the 14th century.
	1919–1933; 1949–present	Flag of Germany; See also: List of German flags	Officially re-adopted on 23 May 1949, and subsequently used by West Germany while the country was divided into East and West before reunification in 1990. The tricolour flag was designed in 1832, and the black, red, and gold colours were taken from the uniforms of German soldiers during the Napoleonic Wars (Out of the blackness (black) of servitude through bloody (red) battles to the golden (gold) light of freedom.) or taken from the coat of arms of the Holy Roman Empire.
	1822 (civil flag); 1978–present	Flag of Greece; See also: List of Greek flags	The current flag of Greece was adopted as a civil flag and ensign in 1822, and as the national flag in 1978. It features a white cross and a combination of nine (five blue and four white) horizontal stripes. The shade of blue has varied over the years, and darker blue (shown) is now commonly used. The alternating white and blue stripes are said to represent the nine syllables of the phrase "Eleftheria i thanatos" ("Freedom or Death"), a popular motto during the Greek War of Independence. During the Kingdom of Greece, a crown was added in the centre of the cross. Greece's national flag between 1822 and 1970 featured a simple white cross on a blue background. It is not known why this version was adopted, and not a blue cross on a white background as was popular in the War of Independence. During the dictatorship, a navy blue version of the current flag with proportions of 7:12 was used.
	1957–present	Flag of Hungary; See also: List of Hungarian flags	The flag of Hungary was officially adopted in 1957, first appearing in 1848. The dominant crimson red, white, and teal green colours of the tricolour design are taken from the historical Hungarian coat of arms. Crimson red is said to symbolise strength, white faithfulness, and teal green hope.
	1915; 1944–present	Flag of Iceland; See also: List of Icelandic flags	The flag of Iceland was adopted in June 1915 to represent Iceland. In June 1944 it became the flag of the independent republic of Iceland. Like other Scandinavian flags, it is based on the Nordic cross. It is a reverse colour image of the Flag of Norway. The blue represents the sea, the white represents the snow and glaciers, and the red symbolises volcanic lava.
	1922–present	Flag of Ireland; See also: List of Irish flags	Although dating from the 19th century, the tricolour flag of Ireland was not popularised until its use by rebels during the 1916 Easter Rising. It was officially adopted by the revolutionary First Dáil (assembly) of the Irish Republic on 21 January 1919, and used thereafter by the Irish Free State. The current 1937 Constitution of Ireland defines it as the national flag. Modeled after the French tricolour, the colours of the Irish tricolour symbolise two communities. Green represents the Roman Catholic nationalist tradition. Orange represents the Protestant unionist community. White symbolises peace between both.
	1946–2003; 2006–present	Flag of Italy; See also: List of Italian flags	Derived from an original design by Napoleon, it consists of three vertical bands of equal width, displaying the national colours of Italy: green, white, and red. Green stands for hope, white for loyalty, and red represents the blood spread to unify the country.
	1992–present	Flag of Kazakhstan; See also: List of Kazakh flags (Note: Kazakhstan is a transcontinental country located mainly in Central Asia with a small part of its territory located west of the Ural Mountains in Eastern Europe.)	Adopted on 4 June 1992. The flag has a gold sun with 32 rays above a soaring golden steppe eagle, both centred on a teal background; the hoist side displays a national ornamental pattern called "koshkar-muiz" (the horns of the ram) in gold.
	1918–1940; 1990–present	Flag of Latvia; See also: List of Latvian flags	The flag of Latvia was officially re-adopted on 27 February 1990. The design is adopted from a 13th-century chronicle where "red divided by white" is said to be a Latvian flag. To distinguish it from the Austrian flag, the proportions 2:1:2 and the "Latvian red" colour have been adopted.
	1937; 1982–present	Flag of Liechtenstein; See also: List of flags of Liechtenstein	The flag of Liechtenstein consists of two horizontal bands of blue and red with a gold crown in the canton. The crown was added to the flag in 1937 after the country found out at the 1936 Summer Olympics that their flag was identical to the civil flag of Haiti.
	1918–1940; 1989–present	Flag of Lithuania; See also: List of Lithuanian flags	The flag of Lithuania was officially re-adopted on 20 March 1989, before Lithuania gained independence from the Soviet Union in 1990. Yellow is symbolic of the country's wheat fields, green symbolic of the forests, and red symbolises patriotism. Collectively the colours represent hope for the future, freedom from oppression, and the courage of the Lithuanian people.
	1845–present	Flag of Luxembourg; See also: List of flags of Luxembourg	The flag of Luxembourg was officially adopted in 1972, although it had been used since 1848 following Luxembourg's independence from the Netherlands in the late 19th century. The flag uses a combination of red, white, and blue that dates to the 13th century, and the Grand Duke's coat of arms.
	1964–present	Flag of Malta; See also: List of flags of Malta	The flag of Malta was officially adopted on 21 September 1964. The flag uses the traditional red and white colours which pre-date those of the Knights of Malta and which Government emulate the arms of the former Universitas of Mdina. The George Cross (upper hoist), outlined in red, was added to the flag in the 1940s, as King George VI of the United Kingdom presented it to islanders for outstanding gallantry during World War II.
	1990–present	Flag of Moldova; See also: List of Moldovan flags	Moldova's flag was officially adopted on 12 May 1990. Once part of Romania, Moldova's flag reflects that association, as the two countries use almost identical shades of red, yellow, and blue in their national flags. The centred Moldova shield's main feature is a golden eagle holding an Orthodox Christian Cross in its beak. The olive branch is said to symbolise peace.
	1881–present	Flag of Monaco; See also: List of flags of Monaco	The flag of Monaco has two horizontal bands of red and white—these have been the heraldic colours of the House of Grimaldi since at least 1339.
	2004–present	Flag of Montenegro; See also: List of flags of Montenegro	The flag of Montenegro, adopted in July 2004, is a red banner bearing the coat of arms adopted in 1993. The country's coat of arms is derived from those of King Nikola.
	1575 (first used); 1937–present (officially adopted)	Flag of the Netherlands; See also: List of flags of the Netherlands	The flag of the Netherlands was officially adopted on 19 February 1937. At one time this tricolour flag was orange, white, and blue, as those were the livery colours of William of Orange, a Dutch prince. In the 17th century, red replaced the orange as a flag colour, because the orange dye used on the flag was unstable, and turned red after exposure to the sun. It is the oldest tricolour flag still in national use and has influenced both the French (1794) and Russian flag (1693); both of these flags have in turn influenced many other European and African flags.
	1995–present	Flag of North Macedonia; See also: List of flags of North Macedonia	The flag of North Macedonia depicts a rising yellow sun with eight rays extending to the edges of the red field. It represents "the new sun of liberty", evoked in the Macedonian national anthem Denes nad Makedonija (Today Over Macedonia).
	1821–1844; 1898–present	Flag of Norway; See also: List of Norwegian flags	The flag of Norway is red with a blue Nordic cross outlined in white; the vertical part of the cross is shifted to the hoist side in the style of the Dannebrog, the flag of Denmark. It was adopted in 1821. A union mark was added in the canton from 1844 to 1898.
	1919–present	Flag of Poland; See also: List of Polish flags	The flag of Poland was officially adopted on 1 August 1919. Polish flag colours date back to the Piast dynasty and the Polish-Lithuanian Commonwealth period. The colours red and white have long been associated with Poland and its coat of arms, at least since 3 May 1791.
	1911–present	Flag of Portugal; See also: List of Portuguese flags	The flag of Portugal was officially adopted on 30 June 1911. The design is a rectangular bi-colour (2:3 ratio) with a field vertically divided into two stripes of different widths—a green stripe on the hoist, and a larger red stripe on the fly. A small version of the national coat of arms (armillary sphere and Portuguese shield) is superimposed over the boundary between the colours at equal distance from the upper and lower edges. The field colours, especially the green, originally represented a radical republican-inspired change that broke the bond with the former religious monarchical flag. In the ensuing decades, these colours were popularly propagandised as representing the hope of the nation (green) and the blood (red) of those who died defending it, as a means to endow them with a more patriotic and dignified, therefore less political, sentiment.
	1848; 1867–1948; 1989–present	Flag of Romania; See also: List of Romanian flags	The flag of Romania was officially re-adopted in 1989. The first red-yellow-blue flag dates from 1834 but the colours themselves are thought to have had special significance from earlier times. The current layout dates since 1848. A vertical tricolour of bands of blue, yellow, and red of equal width and overall proportions of 2:3.
	1721–1922; 1993–present	Flag of Russia; See also: List of Russian flags (Note: Russia is a transcontinental country that spans both Eastern Europe and Northern Asia.)	The Russian Federation flag was officially adopted on 22 August 1991. The flag was hoisted shortly after the former Soviet Union collapsed. The design was first introduced by Peter the Great in 1721, who had adapted the combination of white, blue, and red from the Dutch national flag in order to visually align Russia with modern maritime powers of Europe.
	2011–present	Flag of San Marino; See also: List of Sammarinese flags	The flag of San Marino comprises equal horizontal bands of white and light blue with the national coat of arms superimposed in the centre.
	1815–1918 (original design); 2011–present (Civil flag since 1835)	Flag of Serbia; See also: List of flags of Serbia	The flag of Serbia consists of three horizontal bands of red, blue, and white, with the coat-of-arms located towards the hoist of centre. By accident or design the colours are that of the Russian flag reversed. A flag with three horizontal bands of red, blue, and white has been used as the national flag of Serbia and Serbs since 1815. Red, blue, and white are considered Pan-Slavic colours, but red and blue also occur on flags attributed to a 13th-century king of Serbia. The superimposed coat of arms of Serbia is a double-headed white eagle and a red shield with a white cross surrounded by four firesteels (ocila), a symbol that draws roots from Saint Sava Serbian Cross and from the ancient past of the Balkan peninsula, as it can be seen on 7000 years old Vinča culture pottery and many other later traditional Balkan cultural remains.
	1992–present	Flag of Slovakia; See also: List of Slovak flags	The flag of Slovakia was officially adopted on 1 September 1992. White, blue, and red are traditional Pan-Slavic colours. The superimposed Slovak arms feature a dominant white cross atop a blue symbolic reference to the European country's mountains.
	1991–present	Flag of Slovenia; See also: List of Slovenian flags	The flag of Slovenia was officially adopted on 24 June 1991. Red, white, and blue are taken from the Carniolan coat of arms. The flag without the coat of arms was in use from 1848 to 1945. The Slovenian coat of arms features three gold stars, symbolizing the Counts of Celje. The mountains shown in white are representative of the Alps, and Mount Triglav, Slovenia's national symbol, in particular; the wavy blue lines across the bottom indicate Slovenia's access to the sea.
	1785 (original design); 1981–present	Flag of Spain; See also: List of Spanish flags (Note: Spain is a transcontinental country located mainly in the Iberian Peninsula in southwestern Europe with a small portion of its territory on and around the coast of North Africa near Morocco.)	The flag of Spain was officially adopted on 19 July 1927 as the merchant naval flag, and on 29 December 1978 as the national flag under the current Spanish Constitution. However the first original reference dates back to 15 May 1785, when Charles III of Spain adopted one of the designs proposed by Antonio Valdés y Bazán, commissioned by the king himself, in order to easily differentiate his ships from those of other European nations, many of which used the royal coat of arms over a white background, i.e. the French Bourbon royal flag. The red and golden-yellow colours were used from that day with mere changes on the coat of arms (with the exception of the Spanish Second Republic) and are the original colours found within the coat of arms of the medieval kingdoms of Castile, Aragon and Navarre, first united by King Ferdinand II of Aragon and Queen Isabella I of Castile.
	(1569–1814); 1906–present	Flag of Sweden; See also: List of Swedish flags	The flag of Sweden was officially adopted on 22 June 1906. The off-centre yellow cross is a Nordic cross. The yellow and blue colours are taken from the national coat of arms. The flag was adopted in 1569. A union mark was added in the canton from 1844 to 1905.
	1889–present	Flag of Switzerland; See also: List of Swiss flags	The flag of Switzerland consists of a red square with a bold, equilateral white Greek cross in the centre. It is one of only two square flags, the other being that of the Vatican City or Holy See. It is based on the flag of the Canton of Schwyz, which dates back to 1474 at least.
	1844; 1936–present	Flag of Turkey; See also: List of Turkish flags (Note: Turkey is a transcontinental country located mainly in Western Asia with a small portion of its territory in Southeastern Europe called East Thrace.)	The flag of Turkey is a red flag with a white crescent moon and a star in its centre. The flag is called Ay Yıldız (literally, moon star) or Albayrak (Red flag). It was adopted in 1844 with the Tanzimat reforms; though the shape, placement and shade of the colour vary. The geometric proportions of the flag were legally standardised with the Turkish Flag Law in 1936.
	1918–1920; 1992–present	Flag of Ukraine; See also: List of Ukrainian flags	Ukraine's flag was adopted on 4 September 1991, shortly after the collapse of the former Soviet Union. This is the country's original flag used by the short-lived Ukrainian People's Republic, but it was banned for many decades under the Soviet regime. The shade of blue is said to be symbolic of the sky, while the yellow represents Ukraine's golden wheat fields.
	1801–present	Flag of the United Kingdom; See also: List of United Kingdom flags	The current flag of the United Kingdom dates from the Act of Union 1800, which merged the Kingdom of Great Britain and the Kingdom of Ireland to form the United Kingdom of Great Britain and Ireland. The "Union Jack" merges the red cross of Saint George (patron saint of England), edged in white, superimposed on the diagonal red cross of Saint Patrick (patron saint of Ireland), which are superimposed on the saltire of Saint Andrew (patron saint of Scotland). The flag of Wales, the other country of the United Kingdom, is not graphically represented.
	1929–2001; 2023–present	Flag of Vatican City or Holy See; See also: List of Vatican flags	The flag of Vatican City or Holy See, adopted in June 1929, consists of two vertical bands of yellow and white with the crossed keys of Saint Peter and the Papal Tiara centred in the white band. It is one of only two square country flags in the world, the other being that of Switzerland.

== Flags of other European sovereign entities ==
Flag	Date	Use	Description
	1130–present	Flag of the Sovereign Military Order of Malta	The flag of the Sovereign Military Order of Malta is a red rectangular flag quartered by a white cross.

== Disputed or partially recognised states ==
Flag	Date	Use	Description
	1992–present	Flag of Abkhazia	The flag of Abkhazia consists of seven green and white stripes with a red upper hoist canton bearing a white open right hand and seven white stars.
	2008–present	Flag of Kosovo; See also: List of flags of Kosovo	The flag of Kosovo has a blue background, charged with a map of Kosovo in gold and six white stars. The stars symbolize Kosovo's six major ethnic groups: Albanians, Serbs, Bosniaks, Turks, Romani (often grouped with the Ashkali and Egyptians), and Gorani.
	1984–present	Flag of Northern Cyprus	The flag of Northern Cyprus is white with a red crescent moon and a star in its centre with a red stripe above and below.
	1990–present	Flag of South Ossetia	The flag of South Ossetia is a tricolour, the top stripe white, the middle stripe red, and the bottom stripe yellow.
	2000–present	Flag of Transnistria	The flag of Transnistria consists of three stripes (red-green-red) and the Soviet hammer and sickle; it is based on the flag of the Moldavian SSR.

== Flags of European dependencies ==
Flag	Date	Use	State (status)	Description
	1954–present	Flag of Åland	Finland (autonomous region)	The flag was officially adopted 3 April 1954. As of 1992, it serves as the civil and state flag and ensign. This traditional Scandinavian cross flag features blue, yellow, and red, all said to be borrowed from the national colours of Sweden and Finland.
	1940–present	Flag of the Faroe Islands	Denmark (autonomous region)	The flag of the Faroe Islands, called Merkið, was first used in 1919, was mandated by the British as the civil and state ensign in 1940, and became the official civil and state flag and ensign on 23 March 1948. The flag uses Norwegian colours, commemorating the Faroes once being part of Norway.
	1502–present	Flag of Gibraltar	UK (overseas territory)	The Gibraltar flag dates from 1502, as it is based on the original arms granted it by Spain. The red and white field is taken from the arms, and it is dominated by a red three-towered fortress, complete with a gold key.
	1989–present	Flag of Greenland	Denmark (autonomous territory)	The flag of Greenland features two equal horizontal bands of white (top) and red (bottom) with a counter-changed red-and-white disk slightly to the hoist side of centre.
	1985–present	Flag of Guernsey	UK (Bailiwick of Guernsey)	The flag of Guernsey, adopted in 1985, consists of the red cross of St. George with an additional gold cross within it. The change was prompted by confusion over Guernsey and England using the same flag. The gold cross represents Duke William of Normandy, who had such a cross on his flag in the Battle of Hastings, given to him by Pope Alexander II.
	1932–present	Flag of the Isle of Man	UK (crown dependency)	The flag of the Isle of Man features a red field with a centred triskelion of three bent legs joined at a central point.
	1980–present	Flag of Jersey	UK (crown dependency)	The flag of Jersey, adopted in June 1979, is white with a diagonal red cross, surmounted by a yellow Plantagenet crown, the badge of Jersey (a red shield holding the three leopards of Normandy in yellow). Prior to this, the flag was a plain red saltire on a white field.
	1960–present	Flag of the Sovereign Base Areas of Akrotiri and Dhekelia	UK (overseas territory)	The Union Flag is used.

== Flags of European cities ==
Flags of capitals and cities with over one million inhabitants:

Flag of Amsterdam, Netherlands

Flag of Baku, Azerbaijan (Note: Continental placement may vary depending on geographic convention being followed.)

Flag of Barcelona, Spain

Flag of Belgrade, Serbia

Flag of Berlin, Germany

Flag of Birmingham, England, United Kingdom

Flag of Bucharest, Romania

Flag of Budapest, Hungary

Flag of Cologne, Germany

Flag of Hamburg, Germany

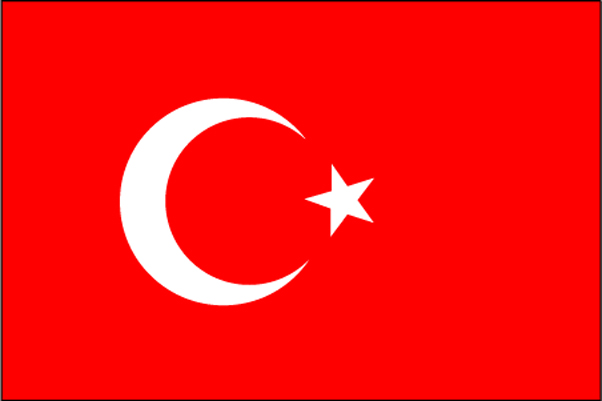
Flag of Istanbul, Turkey

Flag of Kazan, Russia

Flag of Kharkiv, Ukraine

Flag of Krasnodar, Russia

Flag of Kyiv, Ukraine

Flag of the City of London, United Kingdom (Note: Greater London as a whole doesn't have an official flag. The flag of the City of London is displayed here.)

Flag of Madrid, Spain

Flag of Milan, Italy

Flag of Minsk, Belarus

Flag of Moscow, Russia

Flag of Munich, Germany

Flag of Nizhny Novgorod, Russia

Flag of Paris, France

Flag of Perm, Russia

Flag of Prague, Czech Republic

Flag of Rome, Italy

Flag of Rostov-on-Don, Russia

Flag of Saint Petersburg, Russia

Flag of Samara, Russia

Flag of Sarajevo, Bosnia and Herzegovina

Flag of Sofia, Bulgaria

Flag of Tbilisi, Georgia

Flag of Ufa, Russia

Flag of Vienna, Austria

Flag of Volgograd, Russia

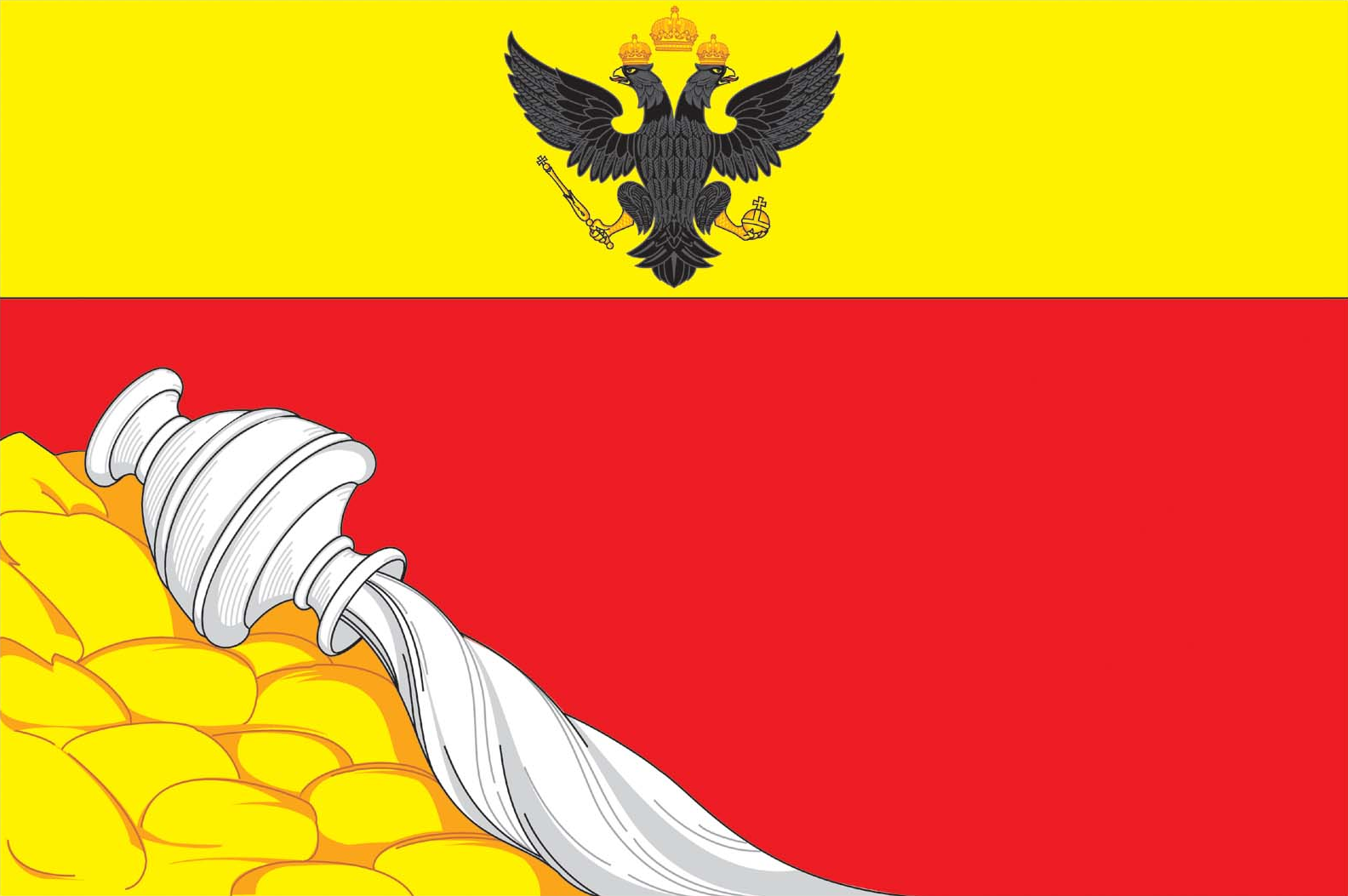
Flag of Voronezh, Russia

Flag of Warsaw, Poland

Flag of Yerevan, Armenia

== Flags of European ethnic groups ==
Flag	Date	Use	Description
Flag of the Crimean Tatars	1917–	Flag of the Crimean Tatars	
Flag of the Forest Finns	2022–	Flag of the Forest Finns	
Flag of the Ingrians	1919–	Flag of the Ingrians	
Flag of the Kven people	2017–	Flag of the Kven people	
Flag of the Livonians	1923–	Flag of the Livonians	
	1971–	Flag of the Romani people	
Flag of the Rusyns	2007–	Flag of the Rusyns	
Sami flag	1986–	Flag of the Sami people	
Flag of the Setos	2003–	Flag of the Setos	
Flag of the Sorbs	1842–	Flag of the Sorbs	
Flag of the Székelys	2004–	Flag of the Székelys	
Flag of the Vepsians	1992–	Flag of the Vepsians	
Flag of the Võros	2013–	Flag of the Võros	
Flag of the Votians	2003–	Flag of the Votians	

== Historical flags ==
Flag	Date	Use as Flag of	Description
Historical British Commonwealth
	1398–1489	Kingdom of Cyprus	The flag was officially adopted on 16 August 1960. The island is depicted in a copper shade representative of its name: the name Cyprus has roots in the Sumerian word for copper (zubar), from the large deposits of copper found on the island. The crossed green olive branches symbolise the hope for peace between the Turks and the Greeks. It was designed by İsmet Güney, a Turkish Cypriot painter.
	1881–1922	British Cyprus	The flag was officially adopted on 16 August 1960. The island is depicted in a copper shade representative of its name: the name Cyprus has roots in the Sumerian word for copper (zubar), from the large deposits of copper found on the island. The crossed green olive branches symbolise the hope for peace between the Turks and the Greeks. It was designed by İsmet Güney, a Turkish Cypriot painter.
	1960–	Cyprus; See also: List of Cypriot flags	The flag was officially adopted on 16 August 1960. The island is depicted in a copper shade representative of its name: the name Cyprus has roots in the Sumerian word for copper (zubar), from the large deposits of copper found on the island. The crossed green olive branches symbolise the hope for peace between the Turks and the Greeks. It was designed by İsmet Güney, a Turkish Cypriot painter.
	1707–1801	Great Britain	The current flag of the United Kingdom dates from the Act of Union 1800, which merged the Kingdom of Great Britain and the Kingdom of Ireland to form the United Kingdom of Great Britain and Ireland. The "Union Jack" merges the red cross of Saint George (patron saint of England), edged in white, superimposed on the diagonal red cross of Saint Patrick (patron saint of Ireland), which are superimposed on the saltire of Saint Andrew (patron saint of Scotland). The flag of Wales, the other country of the United Kingdom, is not graphically represented.
	1801–	United Kingdom; See also: List of United Kingdom flags	
	1815–1864	United States of the Ionian Islands	
	1918–1944	Kingdom of Iceland	The flag of Iceland was adopted in June 1915 to represent Iceland. In June 1944 it became the flag of the independent republic of Iceland. Like other Scandinavian flags, it is based on the Nordic cross. It is a reverse colour image of the Flag of Norway. The blue represents the sea, the white represents the snow and glaciers, and the red symbolises volcanic lava.
	1915; 1944–	Iceland; See also: List of Icelandic flags	The flag of Iceland was adopted in June 1915 to represent Iceland. In June 1944 it became the flag of the independent republic of Iceland. Like other Scandinavian flags, it is based on the Nordic cross. It is a reverse colour image of the Flag of Norway. The blue represents the sea, the white represents the snow and glaciers, and the red symbolises volcanic lava.
	1922–	Ireland; See also: List of Irish flags	Although dating from the 19th century, the tricolour flag of Ireland was not popularised until its use by rebels during the 1916 Easter Rising. It was officially adopted by the revolutionary First Dáil (assembly) of the Irish Republic on 21 January 1919, and used thereafter by the Irish Free State. The current 1937 Constitution of Ireland defines it as the national flag. Modeled after the French tricolour, the colours of the Irish tricolour symbolise two communities. Green represents the Roman Catholic nationalist tradition. Orange represents the Protestant unionist community. White symbolises peace between both.
	1875–1898	Crown Colony of Malta	The flag of Malta was officially adopted on 21 September 1964. The flag uses the traditional red and white colours which pre-date those of the Knights of Malta and which Government emulate the arms of the former Universitas of Mdina. The George Cross (upper hoist), outlined in red, was added to the flag in the 1940s, as King George VI of the United Kingdom presented it to islanders for outstanding gallantry during World War II.
	1898–1923	Crown Colony of Malta	The flag of Malta was officially adopted on 21 September 1964. The flag uses the traditional red and white colours which pre-date those of the Knights of Malta and which Government emulate the arms of the former Universitas of Mdina. The George Cross (upper hoist), outlined in red, was added to the flag in the 1940s, as King George VI of the United Kingdom presented it to islanders for outstanding gallantry during World War II.
	1923–1943	Crown Colony of Malta	The flag of Malta was officially adopted on 21 September 1964. The flag uses the traditional red and white colours which pre-date those of the Knights of Malta and which Government emulate the arms of the former Universitas of Mdina. The George Cross (upper hoist), outlined in red, was added to the flag in the 1940s, as King George VI of the United Kingdom presented it to islanders for outstanding gallantry during World War II.
	1943–1964	Crown Colony of Malta	The flag of Malta was officially adopted on 21 September 1964. The flag uses the traditional red and white colours which pre-date those of the Knights of Malta and which Government emulate the arms of the former Universitas of Mdina. The George Cross (upper hoist), outlined in red, was added to the flag in the 1940s, as King George VI of the United Kingdom presented it to islanders for outstanding gallantry during World War II.
	1964–	Malta; See also: List of flags of Malta	The flag of Malta was officially adopted on 21 September 1964. The flag uses the traditional red and white colours which pre-date those of the Knights of Malta and which Government emulate the arms of the former Universitas of Mdina. The George Cross (upper hoist), outlined in red, was added to the flag in the 1940s, as King George VI of the United Kingdom presented it to islanders for outstanding gallantry during World War II.
Historical German-Roman Empire
	1400–1805	Holy Roman Empire	The tricolour flag was designed in 1832, and the black, red, and gold colours were taken from the uniforms of German soldiers during the Napoleonic Wars (Out of the blackness (black) of servitude through bloody (red) battles to the golden (gold) light of freedom.) or taken from the coat of arms of the Holy Roman Empire.
	1867–1871	North German Confederation	The tricolour flag was designed in 1832, and the black, red, and gold colours were taken from the uniforms of German soldiers during the Napoleonic Wars (Out of the blackness (black) of servitude through bloody (red) battles to the golden (gold) light of freedom.) or taken from the coat of arms of the Holy Roman Empire.
	1871–1918	German Empire	The tricolour flag was designed in 1832, and the black, red, and gold colours were taken from the uniforms of German soldiers during the Napoleonic Wars (Out of the blackness (black) of servitude through bloody (red) battles to the golden (gold) light of freedom.) or taken from the coat of arms of the Holy Roman Empire.
	1918–1933	Weimar Republic	The tricolour flag was designed in 1832, and the black, red, and gold colours were taken from the uniforms of German soldiers during the Napoleonic Wars (Out of the blackness (black) of servitude through bloody (red) battles to the golden (gold) light of freedom.) or taken from the coat of arms of the Holy Roman Empire.
	1933–1935	Nazi Germany	The tricolour flag was designed in 1832, and the black, red, and gold colours were taken from the uniforms of German soldiers during the Napoleonic Wars (Out of the blackness (black) of servitude through bloody (red) battles to the golden (gold) light of freedom.) or taken from the coat of arms of the Holy Roman Empire.
	1935–1945	Nazi Germany	The tricolour flag was designed in 1832, and the black, red, and gold colours were taken from the uniforms of German soldiers during the Napoleonic Wars (Out of the blackness (black) of servitude through bloody (red) battles to the golden (gold) light of freedom.) or taken from the coat of arms of the Holy Roman Empire.
	1949–	Germany; See also: List of German flags	The tricolour flag was designed in 1832, and the black, red, and gold colours were taken from the uniforms of German soldiers during the Napoleonic Wars (Out of the blackness (black) of servitude through bloody (red) battles to the golden (gold) light of freedom.) or taken from the coat of arms of the Holy Roman Empire.
	1949–1959	East Germany	The tricolour flag was designed in 1832, and the black, red, and gold colours were taken from the uniforms of German soldiers during the Napoleonic Wars (Out of the blackness (black) of servitude through bloody (red) battles to the golden (gold) light of freedom.) or taken from the coat of arms of the Holy Roman Empire.
	1959–1990	East Germany	The tricolour flag was designed in 1832, and the black, red, and gold colours were taken from the uniforms of German soldiers during the Napoleonic Wars (Out of the blackness (black) of servitude through bloody (red) battles to the golden (gold) light of freedom.) or taken from the coat of arms of the Holy Roman Empire.
	1804–1867	Austrian Empire	Stripes of red and white have been a collective emblem of Austria for over 800 years, and they were first used on the flag in 1191. According to long-established legend, the red and white flag was designed to resemble the bloodstained white coat worn by the Duke of Austria during a fierce battle.
	1919–1938	Austria; See also: List of Austrian flags	Stripes of red and white have been a collective emblem of Austria for over 800 years, and they were first used on the flag in 1191. According to long-established legend, the red and white flag was designed to resemble the bloodstained white coat worn by the Duke of Austria during a fierce battle.
	1938–1945	Austria within Nazi Germany	Stripes of red and white have been a collective emblem of Austria for over 800 years, and they were first used on the flag in 1191. According to long-established legend, the red and white flag was designed to resemble the bloodstained white coat worn by the Duke of Austria during a fierce battle.
	1945–	Austria; See also: List of Austrian flags	Stripes of red and white have been a collective emblem of Austria for over 800 years, and they were first used on the flag in 1191. According to long-established legend, the red and white flag was designed to resemble the bloodstained white coat worn by the Duke of Austria during a fierce battle.
	1920–	Czech Republic; See also: List of Czech flags	The first flag of Czechoslovakia was white over red, and those colours are the heraldic colours of Bohemia. The blue triangle was added to the flag to distinguish it from the flag of Poland, and blue is said to represent the State of Moravia.
	1920–1939	Free City of Danzig	
	1957–	Hungary; See also: List of Hungarian flags	The flag of Hungary was officially adopted in 1848. The dominant crimson red, white, and teal green colours of the tricolour design are taken from the historical Hungarian coat of arms. Crimson red is said to symbolise strength, white faithfulness, and teal green hope.
	1861–1946	Kingdom of Italy; See also: List of Italian flags	Derived from an original design by Napoleon, it consists of three vertical bands of equal width, displaying the national colours of Italy: green, white, and red. Green stands for hope, white for loyalty, and red represents the blood spread to unify the country.
	1946; 2006–	Italy	Derived from an original design by Napoleon, it consists of three vertical bands of equal width, displaying the national colours of Italy: green, white, and red. Green stands for hope, white for loyalty, and red represents the blood spread to unify the country.
	1719–1852	Liechtenstein; See also: List of Liechtensteinian flags	The flag of Liechtenstein consists of two horizontal bands of blue and red with a gold crown in the canton. The crown was added to the flag in 1937 after the country found out at the 1936 Summer Olympics that their flag was identical to the civil flag of Haiti.
	1852–1921	Liechtenstein; See also: List of Liechtensteinian flags	The flag of Liechtenstein consists of two horizontal bands of blue and red with a gold crown in the canton. The crown was added to the flag in 1937 after the country found out at the 1936 Summer Olympics that their flag was identical to the civil flag of Haiti.
	1921–1937	Liechtenstein; See also: List of Liechtensteinian flags	The flag of Liechtenstein consists of two horizontal bands of blue and red with a gold crown in the canton. The crown was added to the flag in 1937 after the country found out at the 1936 Summer Olympics that their flag was identical to the civil flag of Haiti.
	1937–1982	Liechtenstein; See also: List of Liechtensteinian flags	The flag of Liechtenstein consists of two horizontal bands of blue and red with a gold crown in the canton. The crown was added to the flag in 1937 after the country found out at the 1936 Summer Olympics that their flag was identical to the civil flag of Haiti.
	1982–	Liechtenstein; See also: List of Liechtensteinian flags	The flag of Liechtenstein consists of two horizontal bands of blue and red with a gold crown in the canton. The crown was added to the flag in 1937 after the country found out at the 1936 Summer Olympics that their flag was identical to the civil flag of Haiti.
	1920–1935	Territory of the Saar Basin	
	1947–1956	Saar Protectorate	
	2011–	San Marino; See also: List of Sammarinese flags	The flag of San Marino comprises equal horizontal bands of white and light blue with the national coat of arms superimposed in the centre.
	1889–	Switzerland; See also: List of Swiss flags	The flag of Switzerland consists of a red square with a bold, equilateral white Greek cross in the centre. It is one of only two square flags, the other being that of the Vatican City or Holy See. It is based on the flag of the Canton of Schwyz, which dates back to 1474 at least.
	1929; 2023–	Vatican City/Holy See; See also: List of Vatican flags	The flag of Vatican City or Holy See, adopted in June 1929, consists of two vertical bands of yellow and white with the crossed keys of Saint Peter and the Papal Tiara centred in the white band. It is one of only two square country flags in the world, the other being that of Switzerland.
Historical Latin and Benelux Nations
	1866–	Andorra; See also: List of Andorran flags	The flag of Andorra, adopted in 1866, is a tricolour of blue, yellow, and red with the coat of arms of Andorra in the centre. It is based on the flags of France and Spain. The coat of arms of Andorra is based on the flag of Catalonia (four red ribbons on yellow background).
	1830–	Belgium; See also: List of Belgian flags	Black, gold and red are symbolic of the country's coat of arms. The three-striped vertical layout was inspired by the French Tricolour. Black and gold were chosen, being the colours of the Duchy of Brabant where the Belgian Revolution started. Red was added as a symbol of the blood spilled during the uprising.
	1316–1547	Duchy of Brittany	
	1794–1814; 1830–	France; See also: List of French flags	It was officially adopted on 15 February 1794. The tricolore consists of three vertical bands of equal width, displaying the country's national colours: blue, white, and red. The blue band is positioned nearest the flagstaff, the white in the middle, and the red on the outside. Red, white, and blue have come to represent liberty, equality, and fraternity—the ideals of the French Revolution. Blue and red are also the time-honoured colours of Paris, while white is the colour of the Royal House of Bourbon.
	1845–	Luxembourg; See also: List of flags of Luxembourg	The flag of Luxembourg was officially adopted in 1972, although it had been used since 1848 following Luxembourg's independence from the Netherlands in the late 19th century. The flag uses a combination of red, white, and blue that dates to the 13th century, and the Grand Duke's coat of arms.
	1881–	Monaco; See also: List of flags of Monaco	The flag of Monaco has two horizontal bands of red and white—these have been the heraldic colours of the House of Grimaldi since at least 1339.
	1575 (first used); 1937 (officially adopted)–	Netherlands; See also: List of flags of the Netherlands	The flag of the Netherlands was officially adopted on 19 February 1937. At one time this tricolour flag was orange, white, and blue, as those were the livery colours of William of Orange, a Dutch prince. In the 17th century, red replaced the orange as a flag colour, because the orange dye used on the flag was unstable, and turned red after exposure to the sun. It is the oldest tricolour flag still in national use and has influenced both the French (1794) and Russian flag (1693); both of these flags have in turn influenced many other European and African flags.
	1911–	Portugal; See also: List of Portuguese flags	The flag of Portugal was officially adopted on 30 June 1911. The design is a rectangular bi-colour (2:3 ratio) with a field vertically divided into two stripes of different widths—a green stripe on the hoist, and a larger red stripe on the fly. A small version of the national coat of arms (armillary sphere and Portuguese shield) is superimposed over the boundary between the colours at equal distance from the upper and lower edges. The field colours, especially the green, originally represented a radical republican-inspired change that broke the bond with the former religious monarchical flag. In the ensuing decades, these colours were popularly propagandised as representing the hope of the nation (green) and the blood (red) of those who died defending it, as a means to endow them with a more patriotic and dignified, therefore less political, sentiment.
	1785–1873, 1875–1931	Kingdom of Spain	The flag of Spain was officially adopted on 19 July 1927 as the merchant naval flag, and on 29 December 1978 as the national flag under the current Spanish Constitution. However the first original reference dates back to 15 May 1785, when Charles III of Spain adopted one of the designs proposed by Antonio Valdés y Bazán, commissioned by the king himself, in order to easily differentiate his ships from those of other European nations, many of which used the royal coat of arms over a white background, i.e. the French Bourbon royal flag. The red and golden-yellow colours were used from that day with mere changes on the coat of arms (with the exception of the Spanish Second Republic) and are the original colours found within the coat of arms of the medieval kingdoms of Castile, Aragon and Navarre, first united by King Ferdinand II of Aragon and Queen Isabella I of Castile.
	1873–1874	First Spanish Republic	
	1931–1939	Second Spanish Republic	
	1936–1938	Spanish State	
	1938–1945	Spanish State	
	1945–1977	Spanish State / Kingdom of Spain	
	1977–1981	Kingdom of Spain	
	(1785 original design); 1981–	Spain; See also: List of Spanish flags	
Historical Ottoman Empire
	1912–1946; 2002–	Albania; See also: List of Albanian flags	The flag of Albania, adopted in April 1912, is a red flag with a black double-headed eagle in the centre. It is derived from the seal of Gjergj Kastriot Skanderbeg, a 15th-century Albanian who led a revolt against the Ottoman Empire that resulted in brief independence for Albania from 1443 to 1478.
	1946–1992	People's Socialist Republic of Albania	The flag of Albania, adopted in April 1912, is a red flag with a black double-headed eagle in the centre. It is derived from the seal of Gjergj Kastriot Skanderbeg, a 15th-century Albanian who led a revolt against the Ottoman Empire that resulted in brief independence for Albania from 1443 to 1478.
	1992–	Albania	The flag of Albania, adopted in April 1912, is a red flag with a black double-headed eagle in the centre. It is derived from the seal of Gjergj Kastriot Skanderbeg, a 15th-century Albanian who led a revolt against the Ottoman Empire that resulted in brief independence for Albania from 1443 to 1478.
	1878–1947	Bulgaria; See also: List of Bulgarian flags	The flag of Bulgaria was adopted in 1989 and consists of three horizontal bands of white, green, and red.
	1947–1948	People's Republic of Bulgaria	The flag of Bulgaria was adopted in 1989 and consists of three horizontal bands of white, green, and red.
	1948–1967	People's Republic of Bulgaria	The flag of Bulgaria was adopted in 1989 and consists of three horizontal bands of white, green, and red.
	1967–1971	People's Republic of Bulgaria	The flag of Bulgaria was adopted in 1989 and consists of three horizontal bands of white, green, and red.
	1971–1990	People's Republic of Bulgaria	The flag of Bulgaria was adopted in 1989 and consists of three horizontal bands of white, green, and red.
	1991–	Bulgaria	The flag of Bulgaria was adopted in 1989 and consists of three horizontal bands of white, green, and red.
	1822 (civil flag); 1978–	Greece; See also: List of Greek flags	The current flag of Greece was adopted as a civil flag and ensign in 1822, and as the national flag in 1978. It features a white cross and a combination of nine (five blue and four white) horizontal stripes. The shade of blue has varied over the years, and darker blue (shown) is now commonly used. The alternating white and blue stripes are said to represent the nine syllables of the phrase "Eleftheria i thanatos" ("Freedom or Death"), a popular motto during the Greek War of Independence. During the Kingdom of Greece, a crown was added in the centre of the cross. Greece's national flag between 1822 and 1970 featured a simple white cross on a blue background. It is not known why this version was adopted, and not a blue cross on a white background as was popular in the War of Independence. During the dictatorship, a navy blue version of the current flag with proportions of 7:12 was used.
	1844–1922	Ottoman Empire	The flag of Turkey is a red flag with a white crescent moon and a star in its centre. The flag is called Ay Yıldız (literally, moon star) or Albayrak (Red flag). It was adopted in 1844 with the Tanzimat reforms. Though the shape, placement and shade of the colour vary. The geometric proportions of the flag were legally standardised with the Turkish Flag Law in 1936.
	1844; 1936–	Turkey; See also: List of Turkish flags	The flag of Turkey is a red flag with a white crescent moon and a star in its centre. The flag is called Ay Yıldız (literally, moon star) or Albayrak (Red flag). It was adopted in 1844 with the Tanzimat reforms. Though the shape, placement and shade of the colour vary. The geometric proportions of the flag were legally standardised with the Turkish Flag Law in 1936.
Scandinavian Nations
	1219–	Denmark; See also: List of Danish flags	The world's oldest state flag still in use. Legend has it that it appeared as a sign from heaven to King Valdemar II in 1219. Known as the Dannebrog ("Danish Cloth"), this blood-red flag with an off-centred white cross (a "Nordic cross") became a model for other regional flags.
	1918–	Finland; See also: List of Finnish flags	Officially adopted on 29 May 1918. The off-centred blue cross is based on the Nordic cross, widely used on Nordic national flags. The blue colour is symbolic of blue skies, and the thousands of lakes in Finland. The white represents the winter snows.
	1821–1844; 1898–	Norway; See also: List of Norwegian flags	The flag of Norway is red with a blue Nordic cross outlined in white; the vertical part of the cross is shifted to the hoist side in the style of the Dannebrog, the flag of Denmark. It was adopted in 1821. A union mark was added in the canton from 1844 to 1898.
	(1569–1814); 1906–	Sweden; See also: List of Swedish flags	The flag of Sweden was officially adopted on 22 June 1906. The off-centre yellow cross is a Nordic cross. The yellow and blue colours are taken from the national coat of arms. The flag was adopted in 1569. A union mark was added in the canton from 1844 to 1905.
Historical Soviet, and Communist Republics
	1921–1922	Socialist Soviet Republic of Abkhazia	This recently adopted flag is a simple white rectangle, with a central red cross connecting all four sides of the flag; in each of the four corners is a small red cross. The flag is based on a historic five-cross design that dates back to the 14th century.
	1991–1992	Socialist Soviet Republic of Abkhazia	This recently adopted flag is a simple white rectangle, with a central red cross connecting all four sides of the flag; in each of the four corners is a small red cross. The flag is based on a historic five-cross design that dates back to the 14th century.
	1990–2004	Georgia; See also: List of Georgian flags	This recently adopted flag is a simple white rectangle, with a central red cross connecting all four sides of the flag; in each of the four corners is a small red cross. The flag is based on a historic five-cross design that dates back to the 14th century.
	2004–	Georgia; See also: List of Georgian flags	This recently adopted flag is a simple white rectangle, with a central red cross connecting all four sides of the flag; in each of the four corners is a small red cross. The flag is based on a historic five-cross design that dates back to the 14th century.
	1918–1920	Armenia; See also: List of Armenian flags	After gaining independence, the First Republic of Armenia adopted the modern Armenian tricolour. The independent Armenian government selected the colours used during the last period of the Rubenid Dynasty: red, blue, and orange. The red emblematizes the Armenian Highland, the Armenian people's continued struggle for survival, maintenance of the Christian faith, and Armenia's independence and freedom. The blue emblematizes the will of the people of Armenia to live beneath peaceful skies. The orange emblematizes the creative talent and hard-working nature of the people of Armenia.
	1922	Armenian Soviet Socialist Republic	
	1991–	Armenia	
	1992 – 2023	Artsakh	The flag of Artsakh is based on the Flag of Armenia, and has a white pattern added.
	1918	Democratic Republic of Azerbaijan	Originally adopted in 1918 as a flag of the Democratic Republic of Azerbaijan, it was officially adopted again in 1991, after Azerbaijan gained its independence. The flag of Azerbaijan is the national ensign of Azerbaijan. It consists of three equal horizontal bands coloured blue, red, and green, with a white crescent and an eight-pointed star centred in the red band. The blue band refers to Turkic heritage, the red is for progress and Europeanisation and the green refers to Islam.
	1920	Azerbaijan Soviet Socialist Republic	Originally adopted in 1918 as a flag of the Democratic Republic of Azerbaijan, it was officially adopted again in 1991, after Azerbaijan gained its independence. The flag of Azerbaijan is the national ensign of Azerbaijan. It consists of three equal horizontal bands coloured blue, red, and green, with a white crescent and an eight-pointed star centred in the red band. The blue band refers to Turkic heritage, the red is for progress and Europeanisation and the green refers to Islam.
	1920–1921	Azerbaijan Soviet Socialist Republic	Originally adopted in 1918 as a flag of the Democratic Republic of Azerbaijan, it was officially adopted again in 1991, after Azerbaijan gained its independence. The flag of Azerbaijan is the national ensign of Azerbaijan. It consists of three equal horizontal bands coloured blue, red, and green, with a white crescent and an eight-pointed star centred in the red band. The blue band refers to Turkic heritage, the red is for progress and Europeanisation and the green refers to Islam.
	1921–1922	Azerbaijan Soviet Socialist Republic	Originally adopted in 1918 as a flag of the Democratic Republic of Azerbaijan, it was officially adopted again in 1991, after Azerbaijan gained its independence. The flag of Azerbaijan is the national ensign of Azerbaijan. It consists of three equal horizontal bands coloured blue, red, and green, with a white crescent and an eight-pointed star centred in the red band. The blue band refers to Turkic heritage, the red is for progress and Europeanisation and the green refers to Islam.
	1918–1920; 1991–	Azerbaijan; See also: List of Azerbaijani flags	Originally adopted in 1918 as a flag of the Democratic Republic of Azerbaijan, it was officially adopted again in 1991, after Azerbaijan gained its independence. The flag of Azerbaijan is the national ensign of Azerbaijan. It consists of three equal horizontal bands coloured blue, red, and green, with a white crescent and an eight-pointed star centred in the red band. The blue band refers to Turkic heritage, the red is for progress and Europeanisation and the green refers to Islam.
	1991–1995	Belarus; See also: List of Belarusian flags	Belarus's flag was officially adopted on 10 February 2012. The dominant red-green bicolour was used on its flag when it was a republic within the former Soviet Union. The woven fabric ornament at the hoist uses traditional Belarusian red and white colours.
	1995–2012	Belarus; See also: List of Belarusian flags	Belarus's flag was officially adopted on 10 February 2012. The dominant red-green bicolour was used on its flag when it was a republic within the former Soviet Union. The woven fabric ornament at the hoist uses traditional Belarusian red and white colours.
	1995–	Belarus; See also: List of Belarusian flags	Belarus's flag was officially adopted on 10 February 2012. The dominant red-green bicolour was used on its flag when it was a republic within the former Soviet Union. The woven fabric ornament at the hoist uses traditional Belarusian red and white colours.
	1954–1992	Dagestan Autonomous Soviet Socialist Republic	
	1918–1940; 1990–	Estonia; See also: List of Estonian flags	Officially re-adopted on 8 May 1990. The story of the flag begins on 17 September 1881, when the constituent Assembly of the first Estonian national student Corps "Vironia" (modern Estonian Students Society) in the city of Tartu was also identified in colour; it later became national. The first flag was made in 1884 and this tricolour was accepted in 1918 as the national flag of Estonia. The original flag is still in existence. The first flag of Estonia is kept in Tartu Estonian National Museum. Blue represents loyalty, and the country's beautiful blue skies, seas, and lakes; black is symbolic of past oppression and the fertile soil; and white represents virtue, winter snows, and Estonia's long struggle for freedom and independence.
	1991–1992	Kazakhstan; See also: List of Kazakh flags	Adopted on 4 June 1992. The flag has a gold sun with 32 rays above a soaring golden steppe eagle, both centred on a teal background; the hoist side displays a national ornamental pattern called "koshkar-muiz" (the horns of the ram) in gold.
	1992–	Kazakhstan; See also: List of Kazakh flags	Adopted on 4 June 1992. The flag has a gold sun with 32 rays above a soaring golden steppe eagle, both centred on a teal background; the hoist side displays a national ornamental pattern called "koshkar-muiz" (the horns of the ram) in gold.
	1918–1920	Kuban People's Republic	
	1918–1940; 1990–	Latvia; See also: List of Latvian flags	The flag of Latvia was officially re-adopted on 27 February 1990. The design is adopted from a 13th-century chronicle where "red divided by white" is said to be a Latvian flag. To distinguish it from the Austrian flag, the proportions 2:1:2 and the "Latvian red" colour have been adopted.
	1918–1940; 1989–	Lithuania; See also: List of Lithuanian flags	The flag of Lithuania was officially re-adopted on 20 March 1989, before Lithuania gained independence from the Soviet Union in 1990. Yellow is symbolic of the country's wheat fields, green symbolic of the forests, and red symbolises patriotism. Collectively the colours represent hope for the future, freedom from oppression, and the courage of the Lithuanian people.
	1990–	Moldova; See also: List of Moldovan flags	Moldova's flag was officially adopted on 12 May 1990. Once part of Romania, Moldova's flag reflects that association, as the two countries use almost identical shades of red, yellow, and blue in their national flags. The centred Moldova shield's main feature is a golden eagle holding an Orthodox Christian Cross in its beak. The olive branch is said to symbolise peace.
	1917–1922	Flag of the Mountainous Republic of the Northern Caucasus	
	1815–1918	Congress of Poland	
	1919–	Flag of Poland; See also: List of Polish flags	The colours red and white have long been associated with Poland and its coat of arms, at least since 3 May 1791.
	1867–1948	Romania	The flag of Romania was officially re-adopted in 1989. The first red-yellow-blue flag dates from 1834 but the colours themselves are thought to have had special significance from earlier times. The current layout dates since 1848. A vertical tricolour of bands of blue, yellow, and red of equal width and overall proportions of 2:3.
	1948	Romanian People's Republic	The flag of Romania was officially re-adopted in 1989. The first red-yellow-blue flag dates from 1834 but the colours themselves are thought to have had special significance from earlier times. The current layout dates since 1848. A vertical tricolour of bands of blue, yellow, and red of equal width and overall proportions of 2:3.
	1948–1952	Romanian People's Republic	The flag of Romania was officially re-adopted in 1989. The first red-yellow-blue flag dates from 1834 but the colours themselves are thought to have had special significance from earlier times. The current layout dates since 1848. A vertical tricolour of bands of blue, yellow, and red of equal width and overall proportions of 2:3.
	1952–1965	Romanian People's Republic	The flag of Romania was officially re-adopted in 1989. The first red-yellow-blue flag dates from 1834 but the colours themselves are thought to have had special significance from earlier times. The current layout dates since 1848. A vertical tricolour of bands of blue, yellow, and red of equal width and overall proportions of 2:3.
	1965–1989	Romanian People's Republic	The flag of Romania was officially re-adopted in 1989. The first red-yellow-blue flag dates from 1834 but the colours themselves are thought to have had special significance from earlier times. The current layout dates since 1848. A vertical tricolour of bands of blue, yellow, and red of equal width and overall proportions of 2:3.
	1989–	Romania; See also: List of Romanian flags	The flag of Romania was officially re-adopted in 1989. The first red-yellow-blue flag dates from 1834 but the colours themselves are thought to have had special significance from earlier times. The current layout dates since 1848. A vertical tricolour of bands of blue, yellow, and red of equal width and overall proportions of 2:3.
	1263–1570	Grand Duchy of Moscow	The Russian Federation flag was officially adopted on 22 August 1991. The flag was hoisted shortly after the former Soviet Union collapsed. The white, blue, and red are Pan-Slavic colours.
	1570–1668	Tsardom of Russia	The Russian Federation flag was officially adopted on 22 August 1991. The flag was hoisted shortly after the former Soviet Union collapsed. The white, blue, and red are Pan-Slavic colours.
	1668–1693	Tsardom of Russia	The Russian Federation flag was officially adopted on 22 August 1991. The flag was hoisted shortly after the former Soviet Union collapsed. The white, blue, and red are Pan-Slavic colours.
	1693–1721	Tsardom of Russia	The Russian Federation flag was officially adopted on 22 August 1991. The flag was hoisted shortly after the former Soviet Union collapsed. The white, blue, and red are Pan-Slavic colours.
	1721–1858	Russian Empire	The Russian Federation flag was officially adopted on 22 August 1991. The flag was hoisted shortly after the former Soviet Union collapsed. The white, blue, and red are Pan-Slavic colours.
	1858–1883	Russian Empire	The Russian Federation flag was officially adopted on 22 August 1991. The flag was hoisted shortly after the former Soviet Union collapsed. The white, blue, and red are Pan-Slavic colours.
	1883–1917	Russian Empire	The Russian Federation flag was officially adopted on 22 August 1991. The flag was hoisted shortly after the former Soviet Union collapsed. The white, blue, and red are Pan-Slavic colours.
	1918	Russian Soviet Republic	The Russian Federation flag was officially adopted on 22 August 1991. The flag was hoisted shortly after the former Soviet Union collapsed. The white, blue, and red are Pan-Slavic colours.
	1918–1920	Russian State	The Russian Federation flag was officially adopted on 22 August 1991. The flag was hoisted shortly after the former Soviet Union collapsed. The white, blue, and red are Pan-Slavic colours.
	1920–1922	Russian Socialist Federative Soviet Republic	The Russian Federation flag was officially adopted on 22 August 1991. The flag was hoisted shortly after the former Soviet Union collapsed. The white, blue, and red are Pan-Slavic colours.
	1922–1923	Soviet Union	The Russian Federation flag was officially adopted on 22 August 1991. The flag was hoisted shortly after the former Soviet Union collapsed. The white, blue, and red are Pan-Slavic colours.
	1923–1924	Soviet Union	The Russian Federation flag was officially adopted on 22 August 1991. The flag was hoisted shortly after the former Soviet Union collapsed. The white, blue, and red are Pan-Slavic colours.
	1924–1936	Soviet Union	The Russian Federation flag was officially adopted on 22 August 1991. The flag was hoisted shortly after the former Soviet Union collapsed. The white, blue, and red are Pan-Slavic colours.
	1936–1955	Soviet Union	The Russian Federation flag was officially adopted on 22 August 1991. The flag was hoisted shortly after the former Soviet Union collapsed. The white, blue, and red are Pan-Slavic colours.
	1955–1991	Soviet Union	The Russian Federation flag was officially adopted on 22 August 1991. The flag was hoisted shortly after the former Soviet Union collapsed. The white, blue, and red are Pan-Slavic colours.
	1991–1993	Russia; See also: List of Russian flags	The Russian Federation flag was officially adopted on 22 August 1991. The flag was hoisted shortly after the former Soviet Union collapsed. The white, blue, and red are Pan-Slavic colours.
	1993–	Russia; See also: List of Russian flags	The Russian Federation flag was officially adopted on 22 August 1991. The flag was hoisted shortly after the former Soviet Union collapsed. The white, blue, and red are Pan-Slavic colours.
	1440–1500	Crimean Khanate	Ukraine's flag was adopted on 4 September 1991, shortly after the collapse of the former Soviet Union. This is the country's original flag used by the short-lived Ukrainian People's Republic, but it was banned for many decades under the Soviet regime. The shade of blue is said to be symbolic of the sky, while the yellow represents Ukraine's golden wheat fields.
	1500–1542	Crimean Khanate	Ukraine's flag was adopted on 4 September 1991, shortly after the collapse of the former Soviet Union. This is the country's original flag used by the short-lived Ukrainian People's Republic, but it was banned for many decades under the Soviet regime. The shade of blue is said to be symbolic of the sky, while the yellow represents Ukraine's golden wheat fields.
	1542–1604	Grand Duchy of Lithuania	Ukraine's flag was adopted on 4 September 1991, shortly after the collapse of the former Soviet Union. This is the country's original flag used by the short-lived Ukrainian People's Republic, but it was banned for many decades under the Soviet regime. The shade of blue is said to be symbolic of the sky, while the yellow represents Ukraine's golden wheat fields.
	1605–1795	Polish–Lithuanian Commonwealth	Ukraine's flag was adopted on 4 September 1991, shortly after the collapse of the former Soviet Union. This is the country's original flag used by the short-lived Ukrainian People's Republic, but it was banned for many decades under the Soviet regime. The shade of blue is said to be symbolic of the sky, while the yellow represents Ukraine's golden wheat fields.
	1654–1655	Cossack Hetman	Ukraine's flag was adopted on 4 September 1991, shortly after the collapse of the former Soviet Union. This is the country's original flag used by the short-lived Ukrainian People's Republic, but it was banned for many decades under the Soviet regime. The shade of blue is said to be symbolic of the sky, while the yellow represents Ukraine's golden wheat fields.
	1721–1858	Russian Empire	Ukraine's flag was adopted on 4 September 1991, shortly after the collapse of the former Soviet Union. This is the country's original flag used by the short-lived Ukrainian People's Republic, but it was banned for many decades under the Soviet regime. The shade of blue is said to be symbolic of the sky, while the yellow represents Ukraine's golden wheat fields.
	1858–1883	Russian Empire	Ukraine's flag was adopted on 4 September 1991, shortly after the collapse of the former Soviet Union. This is the country's original flag used by the short-lived Ukrainian People's Republic, but it was banned for many decades under the Soviet regime. The shade of blue is said to be symbolic of the sky, while the yellow represents Ukraine's golden wheat fields.
	1883–1917	Russian Empire	Ukraine's flag was adopted on 4 September 1991, shortly after the collapse of the former Soviet Union. This is the country's original flag used by the short-lived Ukrainian People's Republic, but it was banned for many decades under the Soviet regime. The shade of blue is said to be symbolic of the sky, while the yellow represents Ukraine's golden wheat fields.
	1917–1919	Ukrainian People's Republic	Ukraine's flag was adopted on 4 September 1991, shortly after the collapse of the former Soviet Union. This is the country's original flag used by the short-lived Ukrainian People's Republic, but it was banned for many decades under the Soviet regime. The shade of blue is said to be symbolic of the sky, while the yellow represents Ukraine's golden wheat fields.
	1919–1922	Ukrainian Soviet Socialist Republic	Ukraine's flag was adopted on 4 September 1991, shortly after the collapse of the former Soviet Union. This is the country's original flag used by the short-lived Ukrainian People's Republic, but it was banned for many decades under the Soviet regime. The shade of blue is said to be symbolic of the sky, while the yellow represents Ukraine's golden wheat fields.
	1918–1920; 1992–	Ukraine; See also: List of Ukrainian flags	Ukraine's flag was adopted on 4 September 1991, shortly after the collapse of the former Soviet Union. This is the country's original flag used by the short-lived Ukrainian People's Republic, but it was banned for many decades under the Soviet regime. The shade of blue is said to be symbolic of the sky, while the yellow represents Ukraine's golden wheat fields.
Historical Yugoslavian Republics
	1992–1998	Bosnia and Herzegovina	The flag of Bosnia and Herzegovina consists of a wide medium blue vertical band on the fly side with a yellow isosceles triangle abutting the band and the top of the flag. The remainder of the flag is medium blue with seven five-pointed white stars and two half stars top and bottom along the hypotenuse of the triangle. The three points of the triangle stand for the three nations of Bosnia: Bosniaks, Croats, and Serbs. It is said to represent the map of Bosnia.
	1998–	Bosnia and Herzegovina	The flag of Bosnia and Herzegovina consists of a wide medium blue vertical band on the fly side with a yellow isosceles triangle abutting the band and the top of the flag. The remainder of the flag is medium blue with seven five-pointed white stars and two half stars top and bottom along the hypotenuse of the triangle. The three points of the triangle stand for the three nations of Bosnia: Bosniaks, Croats, and Serbs. It is said to represent the map of Bosnia.
Flag of Croatia	1990–	Croatia; See also: List of Croatian flags	The flag of Croatia, adopted in December 1990, consists of three equal horizontal stripes of red, white, and blue and the coat of arms of Croatia in the centre.
	1835–1882	Principality of Serbia	The flag of Serbia consists of three horizontal bands of red, blue, and white, with the coat-of-arms located towards the hoist of centre. By accident or design the colours are that of the Russian flag reversed. A flag with three horizontal bands of red, blue, and white has been used as the national flag of Serbia and Serbs since 1815. Red, blue, and white are considered Pan-Slavic colours, but red and blue also occur on flags attributed to a 13th-century king of Serbia. The superimposed coat of arms of Serbia is a double-headed white eagle and a red shield with a white cross surrounded by four firesteels (ocila), a symbol that draws roots from Saint Sava Serbian Cross and from the ancient past of the Balkan peninsula, as it can be seen on 7000 years old Vinča culture pottery and many other later traditional Balkan cultural remains. The flag of Montenegro, adopted in July 2004, is a red banner bearing the coat of arms adopted in 1993. The country's coat of arms is derived from those of King Nikola.
	1852–1905	Principality of Montenegro/ Kingdom of Montenegro	
	1882–1918	Kingdom of Serbia	
	1905–1918	Kingdom of Montenegro	
	1918–1941	Yugoslavia	
	1943–1946	Yugoslavia	
	1946–1992	Yugoslavia	
	1992–2006	Serbia and Montenegro	
	2006–	Montenegro; See also: List of flags of Montenegro	
	1835 (civil flag); 2010–	Serbia; See also: List of flags of Serbia	
	1991–1992	Republic of Macedonia	The flag of North Macedonia depicts a rising yellow sun with eight rays extending to the edges of the red field. It represents "the new sun of liberty", evoked in the Macedonian national anthem Denes nad Makedonija (Today Over Macedonia).
	1992–1995	Republic of Macedonia	The flag of North Macedonia depicts a rising yellow sun with eight rays extending to the edges of the red field. It represents "the new sun of liberty", evoked in the Macedonian national anthem Denes nad Makedonija (Today Over Macedonia).
	1995–	North Macedonia; See also: List of flags of North Macedonia	The flag of North Macedonia depicts a rising yellow sun with eight rays extending to the edges of the red field. It represents "the new sun of liberty", evoked in the Macedonian national anthem Denes nad Makedonija (Today Over Macedonia).
	1992–	Slovakia; See also: List of Slovak flags	The flag of Slovakia was officially adopted on 1 September 1992. White, blue, and red are traditional Pan-Slavic colours. The superimposed Slovak arms feature a dominant white cross atop a blue symbolic reference to the European country's mountains.
	1991–	Slovenia; See also: List of Slovenian flags	The flag of Slovenia was officially adopted on 24 June 1991. Red, white, and blue are taken from the Carniolan coat of arms. The flag without the coat of arms was in use from 1848 to 1945. The Slovenian coat of arms features three gold stars, symbolizing the Counts of Celje. The mountains shown in white are representative of the Alps, and Mount Triglav, Slovenia's national symbol, in particular; the wavy blue lines across the bottom indicate Slovenia's access to the sea.

=== Historical supranational and international flags ===
Flag	Date	Use	Description
	1949–1991	Flag of the Council for Mutual Economic Assistance	
	1958–1972	Flag of the European Coal and Steel Community	
	1973–1980	Flag of the European Coal and Steel Community	
	1981–1985	Flag of the European Coal and Steel Community	
	1986–2002	Flag of the European Coal and Steel Community	
	1993–1995	Flag of the Western European Union	
	1995–2011	Flag of the Western European Union	

== See also ==
- Vexillology
- Vexillological symbol
- Glossary of vexillology
- Civil flag
- Ensign (flag)
- Ethnic flag
- Flag families
- Maritime flag
- National flag
- National coat of arms
- National emblem
- National seal
- National symbol
- State flag
- Flag of Europe
- Armorial of Europe

Lists of flags of European countries

- List of Albanian flags
- List of Andorran flags
- List of Armenian flags
- List of Austrian flags
- List of Azerbaijani flags
- List of Belarusian flags
- List of Belgian flags
- List of flags of Bosnia and Herzegovina
- List of Bulgarian flags
- List of Croatian flags
- List of Cypriot flags
- List of Czech flags
- List of Danish flags
- List of Estonian flags
- List of flags of Finland
- List of French flags
  - List of Breton flags
  - List of Corsican flags
- List of flags of Georgia (country)
- List of German flags
- List of Greek flags
- List of Hungarian flags
- List of Icelandic flags
- List of flags of Ireland
- List of Italian flags
- List of Kazakh flags
- List of flags of Kosovo
- List of flags of Latvia
- List of Liechtensteinian flags
- List of flags of Lithuania
- List of flags of Luxembourg
- List of flags of Malta
- List of Moldovan flags
- List of Monégasque flags
- List of flags of Montenegro
- List of flags of the Netherlands
- List of flags of North Macedonia
- List of Norwegian flags
- List of Polish flags
- List of Portuguese flags
- List of Romanian flags
- List of Russian flags
- List of Sammarinese flags
- List of Serbian flags
- List of Slovak flags
- List of Slovenian flags
- List of Spanish flags
- List of flags of Sweden
- List of Swiss flags
- List of Turkish flags
- List of Ukrainian flags
- List of United Kingdom flags
  - List of English flags
    - List of Cornish flags
  - List of Northern Irish flags
  - List of Scottish flags
  - List of Welsh flags
- List of Vatican flags
- Flags of Austria-Hungary
- Flags of the Holy Roman Empire
- List of Soviet flags
- List of Yugoslav flags

Other pages about European flags

- Nordic cross flag
- Pan-Slavic colours
- Flag of the Romani people

Galleries and lists

- Gallery of sovereign state flags
- Gallery of flags of dependent territories
- Lists of flags
- List of flags by design
- List of national flags by design
- List of national flags of sovereign states
- List of Japanese flags
- List of United Kingdom flags
- List of Antarctic flags
- List of flags by color combination
- List of sovereign states by date of current flag adoption
- Gallery pages of flags of country subdivisions
