= List of Moldovan flags =

The following is a list of flags of Moldova.

== National flag and state flag ==
Flag	Date	Use	Description
	2010–present	National flag and ensign	A blue, yellow, and red tricolor, with the national coat of arms in the center bar. Ratio: 1:2.
	2010–present	Reverse flag	The reverse side is a mirror image of the obverse.

== Autonomous regions flags ==
Flag	Date	Use	Description
	1995–present	Flag of Gagauzia	A blue, white, and red horizontal tricolor with stripe proportions of 3:1:1. Three yellow stars (15/100 of flag-width) on the blue stripe, forming an equilateral triangle with the base at hoist. Ratio: 1:2

== Governmental flags ==
Flag	Date	Use	Description
	?–present	Border Guard Service flag	Ratio: 2:3
	1997–present	Customs flag on land	Ratio: 2:3
	1997–present	Customs ensign	
	?–present	Principal State Inspectorate for Technical Supervising of Dangerous Industrial Objects flag	Ratio: 2:3
	?–present	Standard of the president	Ratio: 1:1
	?–present	Standard of the president of the Parliament	Ratio: 1:1
	?–present	Standard of the prime minister	Ratio: 1:1
	?–present	The Moldovan Department of Civil Defence	Ratio: 2:3

== Military flag ==
Flag	Date	Use	Description
	1998–present	Flag of the Armed Forces	A blue cloth, charged with a red cross bordered yellow. On obverse, the emblem of the National Army in the middle. On reverse, instead of the emblem, with golden letters, the motto in Romanian: Pentru Onoare! Pentru Patrie! Pentru Tricolor! ("For Honor! For Country! For the Tricolor!"). Ratio: 2:3

== Historical flags ==
- For flags of Moldova as part of Romania (southern 1856–1878; all 1918–1940 and 1941–1944) see List of Romanian flags.

Flag	Date	Use	Description
	1990–2010	State flag of the Republic of Moldova	Ratio: 1:2.
	1990–2010	Reverse flag	The reverse side did not bear the coat of arms found on the obverse.
	1990	State flag of the Moldavian Soviet Socialist Republic, later known as SSR Moldova	Ratio: 1:2.
	1990	State flag of the Moldavian Soviet Socialist Republic, later known as SSR Moldova	Early prototype
	1952–1990	State flag of the Moldavian Soviet Socialist Republic	Ratio: 1:2.
	1952–1990	Reverse flag	All flags of the constituent republics of the Soviet Union did not bear the hammer and sickle on their reverse side.
	1940–1952	State flag of the Moldavian Soviet Socialist Republic	Ratio: 1:2.
	1938–1940	State flag of the Moldavian Autonomous Soviet Socialist Republic	Ratio: 1:2.
	1937–1938	State flag of the Moldavian Autonomous Soviet Socialist Republic	Ratio: 1:2.
	1925–1932	State flag of the Moldavian Autonomous Soviet Socialist Republic	Ratio: 1:2.
	1917–1918	Military colors of the Moldavian Democratic Republic	Blue, yellow, and red horizontal tricolor, proportions: 1:1:1. White RM initials over the flag. Ratio: 2:3.
	1917–1918	Flag of Sfatul Țării	Blue, yellow, and red horizontal tricolor, proportions: 1:1:1. Coat of arms in the middle of yellow and red stripes and the parliament's name on the blue stripe. Ratio: 2:3.
	1917–1918	State flag of the Moldavian Democratic Republic	Blue, yellow, and red horizontal tricolor, proportions: 1:1:1. Coat of arms in the middle and country's name on the blue stripe. Ratio: 2:3.
	1856–1861	Military colors and naval ensign of the Principality of Moldavia	Ratio: 1:1.
	1834–1861	Civil ensign of the Principality of Moldavia	Ratio: 2:3.
	17th century	Banner of the Moldavian cavalry	
	around 1601	Infantry flag of the Principality of Moldavia	
	around 1500	Military colors (?) of the Principality of Moldavia	
	around 1574	Flag of the Moldavian principality, described by Alexander Guagnini	
	1531	Moldavian banner at the Battle of Obertyn	
	1467	Moldavian flag in the Battle of Baia	
	14th–19th century	State flag of the Principality of Moldavia	Ratio: 2:3.

== Municipal flags ==
Flag	Date	Use	Description
	1998–present	Chișinău	Ratio: 1:2
	?–present	Anenii Noi	
	?–present	Bălți	
	2003–present	Bender	Ratio: 1:2
	?–present	Căușeni	
	2010–present	Cimișlia (flag)	Ratio: 2:3
	?–present	Comrat	
	?–present	Drochia	
	1997–present	Orhei	Ratio: 1:2
	?–present	Rîbnița	
	?–present	Tiraspol	Ratio: 2:3
	?–present	Ungheni	Ratio: 1:2

== Former national flag proposals ==
Flag	Date	Use	Description
	Proposed in 2010	The Communist Party's proposed flag for Moldova.	
	Proposed in 2017	Igor Dodon's proposed flag for Moldova.	

== Transnistria ==
Flag	Date	Use	Description
	1991–present	State flag and ensign, war flag	
	1991–present	Civil flag and ensign, reverse side of state flag/ensign	
	2017–present	Co-official national flag	Flag of Russia

=== Standards ===
Flag	Date	Use	Description
	2000–present	Presidential standard	

=== Historical flags ===
Flag	Date	Use	Description
	1925–1932	Flag of the Moldavian Autonomous Soviet Socialist Republic	Ratio: 1:2.
	1937–1938	Flag of the Moldavian Autonomous Soviet Socialist Republic	Ratio: 1:2.
	1938–1940	Flag of the Moldavian Autonomous Soviet Socialist Republic	Ratio: 1:2.
	1940–1952	Flag of the Moldavian Soviet Socialist Republic	Ratio: 1:2.
	1952–1990	Flag of the Moldavian Soviet Socialist Republic	Ratio: 1:2.
