= List of Cypriot flags =

This is a complete list of the flags used in the island of Cyprus. For the national flags, see flag of Cyprus, and flag of Akrotiri and Dhekelia.

== National flags ==
Flag	Date	Use	Description
	2006–present	National flag of Cyprus	An outline of the island of Cyprus above twin olive branches on a white field.
	1984–present (recognised only by Turkey)	Flag of Northern Cyprus	A red star and crescent – slightly towards the hoist from the centre – between two horizontal red bars on a white field.
	1960–present	Flag of Akrotiri and Dhekelia	The flag of the United Kingdom is used.
	1974–present	Flag of the United Nations Buffer Zone in Cyprus	The flag of the United Nations is used.

== Government flags ==
Flag	Date	Use	Description
	2006–present	Presidential standard of Cyprus	Square version of the national flag.
	1984–present	Presidential standard of Northern Cyprus	A gold, red, and white star located in the upper hoist corner of the Northern Cyprus flag.

== Political flags ==
Flag	Date	Party	Description
	2008–present	ELAM	

== Ethnic group flags ==
Flag	Date	Use	Description
	1950–present	Unifying flag of Cyprus (Enotiki Simaia)	Used by a small number of Greek Cypriots until today. It represents the willing of Greek Cypriots for union with Greece (Enosis).

== Municipality flag ==
Flag	Date	Use	Description
	1960–present	Flag of Nicosia	A white field with the emblem in the center.
	1960–present	Flag of Paphos	A blue field with the emblem in the center.
	1960–present	Flag of Larnaka	A white field with the emblem in the center.
	1960–present	Flag of Limassol	A white field with the emblem in the center.
	1960–present	Flag of Famagusta	A white field with the emblem in the center.
	1960–present	Flag of Kyrenia	A white field with the emblem in the center.

== Military flags ==
Flag	Date	Use	Description
	1964–present	Jack of the Cyprus Navy	A square flag with a white cross on a blue field, with a crossed anchor, trident, and cross in gold superimposed.
	1964–present	Flag of the Cypriot National Guard	A flag with horizontal stripes of blue, red, and light blue, all separated with thin white stripes, with the emblem in the center.

== Historical flags ==
Flag	Date	Use	Description
	1821	Flag of the Greek War of Independence	A flag based on older patterns, this design first appeared in 1769 during the Orlov Revolt. Used, among others, by the Kolokotronis family, this flag was the most widely used throughout Greece and Cyprus during the initial stages of the 1821 War of Independence.
	1978–1984 (used today by the Greek Cypriots)	Flag of Greece	Nine equal horizontal stripes of blue and white, alternating. There is a blue canton in the upper hoist-side corner bearing a white cross.
	1975–1978	Flag of Greece	A white cross on a blue field.
	1974–1975	Flag of Greece under the Colonels' regime.	The sea flag, in ratio 7:12 and in very dark shade of blue (dark "midnight blue"). The old "land" version was restored as national flag in 1975.
	1974–1984 (used today by the Turkish Cypriots)	Flag of Turkey	A red field with a white crescent and a five-pointed star.
	1960–2006	Second flag of Cyprus	An outline of the island of Cyprus above twin olive branches on a white field.
	1960	First flag of Cyprus	An unfilled outline of the island of Cyprus above twin olive branches on a white field.
Flags of EOKA	1955–1959	Flags of the Ethniki Organosis Kyprion Agoniston (National Organisation of Cypriot Fighters), Greek Cypriot organisation that fought for the end of British rule in Cyprus, for the island's self-determination and for eventual union with Greece.	The first consist a white cross on a blue field with Cyprus in the middle. It is used until today in Cyprus by many Greek Cypriots. The second flag of EOKA with blue and white segments sewn together to form a white cross on a blue background. Embroidered red thread Greek script lettering, including 'EOKA' and 'ΕΛΕΥΘΕΡΙΑ Ή ΘΆΝΑΤΟΣ' (Freedom or Death) and 'ΖΗΤΩ Η ΕΛΛΑΣ' (Ηail Greece)
	1922–1960	Second and last flag of British Cyprus	A British Blue Ensign defaced with the two red lions of Cyprus.
	1922–1960	Civil ensign of Cyprus	A British Red Ensign defaced with the two red lions of Cyprus.
	1922–1960	Flag of the governor of Cyprus	
	1881–1922	First flag of British Cyprus	A British Blue Ensign defaced with the emblem of Cyprus.
	1881–1905	Flag of the High Commissioner of Cyprus	
	1878–1960 (used today in Akrotiri and Dhekelia)	Flag of the United Kingdom	A superimposition of the flags of England and Scotland with the Saint Patrick's Saltire (representing Ireland).
	1844–1878	Flag of the Ottoman Empire (Ottoman Cyprus)	A red field with a white crescent and a five-pointed star.
	1793–1844	Flag of the Ottoman Empire (Ottoman Cyprus)	A red field with a white crescent and an eight-pointed star.
	1571–1793	Flag of the Ottoman Empire	A red field with a dark crescent in the center.
	1489–1571	Flag of the Republic of Venice (Venetian Cyprus)	A gold Lion of St. Mark on a field of dark red with a six-tongued fringe at the fly.
	1400–1489	Royal banner of Janus of Cyprus	A quartered flag with the heraldry of Jerusalem, de Lusignan, Armenia, and Cyprus, declaring a claim to reign over the former kingdoms of Cilician Armenia and Jerusalem.
	1350–1400	Royal flag as reported by the Book of All Kingdoms	A horizontally divided banner, one half white with the Jerusalem cross, and one half purple with five golden Fleur-de-lis.
	1198–1219	Flag of the Armenian Kingdom of Cilicia	A red crowned lion on a white field.
	1192	Flag of the Kingdom of Jerusalem	A white field with the Jerusalem cross in the center.
	1192	Battle flag of the Knights Templar	A horizontally divided flag of black and white with a red cross in the center.
	1191–1192	Royal banner of King Richard I	A red field with three gold lions facing left, with a paw raised and their heads turned towards the viewer.
	661–680	Flag of the Umayyad Caliphate	A white field.

== Proposed flags ==
Flag	Date	Use	Description
	1959	Proposed flag of Cyprus	A white field with a letter K in the center.
	1983	Proposed flag of Northern Cyprus	An outline of the island of Cyprus above twin olive branches on a white field with the flag of Turkey placed in the canton (upper hoist).
	2003	Flag of the "United Republic of Cyprus" proposed as part of the Annan Plan	A flag with horizontal stripes of blue, yellow, and red, all separated with thin white stripes.

== Northern Cyprus ==
Flag	Date	Use	Description
	1984–present	Flag of Northern Cyprus	A red star and crescent – slightly towards the hoist from the centre – between two horizontal red bars on a white field.
	1984–present	Flag of the president of the Turkish Republic of Northern Cyprus	
	1983–1984	Reported flag of the Turkish Republic of Northern Cyprus from 1983 to 1984	A white star and crescent – slightly towards the hoist from the centre – between two horizontal white bars on a red field.

== See also ==
- Flag of Cyprus
- Flag of Northern Cyprus
- Flag of Akrotiri and Dhekelia
- Coat of arms of Cyprus
- Flag of Greece
- Flag of Turkey
