= List of Icelandic flags =

The following is a list of Icelandic flags.

== National flag and State flag ==
Flag	Date	Use	Description
	1944–present	Civil flag and ensign	A blue flag with a red Nordic cross, fimbriated white. Used unofficially in 1913–1918, and as a territorial symbol as of 1918 until 1944 when the Republic of Iceland was established. Current color scheme established in 1944. The dimensions of the flag are 7:1:2:1:14 horizontally and 7:1:2:1:7 vertically; ratio: 18:25
	1944–present	State flag and ensign, war flag and naval ensign	A swallowtail flag otherwise similar to the civil flag. Ratio: 9:16

== City flags ==
Flag	Date	Use	Description
	6 June 1957–present	Flag of Reykjavík (capital city of Iceland)	White flag with the coat of arms of Reykjavík in the middle.

== Governmental flags ==
Flag	Date	Use	Description
	1944–present	President's flag	The Icelandic swallowtail flag with the coat of arms in a white square at the junction of the cross. Ratio: 9:16
	1944–present	Customs ensign	The Icelandic swallowtail flag with the a capital "T" in the canton. Ratio: 9:16

== Military flag ==
Flag	Date	Use	Description
	1944–present	The state flag is used as a war flag and naval ensign by the Icelandic Coast Guard, Iceland Air Defence System, and Icelandic Crisis Response Unit.	The Icelandic swallowtail flag.

== Historical flags ==
Flag	Date	Use	Description
	1262–1397	Flag of Norway	Banner of arms with golden lion on red canvas.
	1397–1523	The "Banner of the realms", flag of the Kalmar Union.	A red cross in a yellow field.
	1523–1918	Flag of Denmark	A red field charged with a white Nordic cross that extends to the edges; the vertical part of the cross is shifted to the hoist side.
	July 11th 1809–August 19th 1809	Proposal for what the flag of Iceland might have looked like during the rule of Jørgen Jørgensen	It’s not fully known what Jørgen’s flag really looked like. There are no surviving copies and his original description simply read as: “The Icelandic flag shall be blue, with three white stockfishes on it”. Due to this vague description, there can be multiple different interpretations of what the flag looked like. The example shown here shows three stockfishes in the first quarter on a dark-blue field. The word “stockfishes” in Jørgen’s description could also be interpreted simply as “cods”, so the symbols on his flag might not have been stockfishes
	1857–1869	Standard of the Vestmannaeyjar Battalion (Herfylkingin)	A red saltire cross on a white field. In an old drawing of the Herfylking, the flag is shown with seemingly black text at the top and bottom of the flag, although it’s impossible to make out what the text says
	1918–1944	National flag and civil ensign of Iceland	It is almost identical to the newer Icelandic flag but this has a lighter blue color.
	1918–1944	War flag and naval ensign of Iceland	It is almost identical to the newer Icelandic flag but this has a lighter blue color, just like the normal flag, above.
	1921–1944	Royal standard of the Kingdom of Iceland	Crowned gyrfalcon on a blue field
	1940–1941	Flag of the United Kingdom, also commonly known as the Union Jack.	A superimposition of the flags of England and Scotland with the Saint Patrick's Saltire (representing Ireland).
	1941–1944	Flag of the United States	Thirteen horizontal stripes alternating red and white; in the canton, 48 white stars on blue field.
	1941–1944	Standard of the Regent of Iceland	State flag of Iceland charged with a capital gold R on a rectangular panel

== Unofficial flags ==
Flag	Date	Use	Description
	19th – early 20th century	Flag used by the independence movement	A gyrfalcon on a blue field
		Flag proposal. The flag committee of 1913 presented two proposals, the current flag and this flag.	White with a sky-blue cross with a white and blue stripe on either side.
		Republican flag	Unofficial flag used by the republicans in the early 1900s. This flag was rejected by the flag committee of 1913 as it was considered too similar to the flag of Sweden and the Greek naval ensign.

== Yacht club flags of Iceland ==
Flag	Date	Use	Description
		Brokey Yacht Club	Burgee of Siglingafélag Reykjavíkur, Brokey.

== Political flags ==
Flag	Date	Use	Description
	1934–1944	Nationalist Party	Republican flag defaced with red swastika.
	2012–present	Pirate Party	

== See also ==
- Flag of Iceland
- Coat of arms of Iceland
