= List of Slovenian flags =

The following is a list of flags of Slovenia. For more information about the national flag, see the Flag of Slovenia.

== National flag ==
Flag	Date	Use	Description
	1991–present	Flag of Slovenia	A horizontal tricolor of white, blue, and red; charged with the coat of arms at the hoist side.
	1991–present	Flag of Slovenia (vertical)	

== Government flags ==
Flag	Date	Use	Description
	1991–present	Flag of the President of Slovenia	A white field with a tricolor border in white, blue, and red. The national coat of arms is at the center.
	1991–present	Flag of the President of the National Assembly of Slovenia	A red field with a blue border, with the national coat of arms at the center.
	1991–present	Flag of the Prime Minister of Slovenia	A blue field with a red border, with the national coat of arms at the center.
	1991–present	Flag of the Minister of Defence of Slovenia	A crimson field with an azure border, in the center is the Slovenian Army emblem.
	1991–present	Flag of the Chief of the General Staff of Slovenia	An azure field with a crimson border, the center contains the Slovenian Army emblem.

== Political party flags ==
Flag	Date	Use	Description
	1937–1993	Flag of the League of Communists of Slovenia	
	1989–present	Flag of the Slovenian Democratic Party	A horizontal triband of yellow, white, and yellow charged with the letters “SDS” in blue.
	1993–present	Flag of the Social Democrats of Slovenia	A red field charged with the letters “SD” in white.

== Military flags ==
Flag	Date	Use	Description
	1991–present	Flag of the Slovenian Armed Forces	A horizontal tricolor of white, blue, and red, with the Slovenian Army emblem in the center. Surrounding it in gold (in Slovenian) reads "Republic of Slovenia; Slovene Army".
	1995–1996	Naval jack of Slovenia	A navy blue field with the national coat of arms in the center.
	1996–present	Naval jack of Slovenia	A horizontal tricolor of white, blue, yellow.

== Historical flags ==
Flag	Date	Use	Description
	800–888	Imperial Oriflamme of Charlemagne	A green three-tailed flag with eight golden crosses and six flowers.
	907–962	Flag of the Principality of Hungary	A red swallow-tailed flag.
	962–1401	Banner of the Emperor of the Romans and of the King of Germany	A black eagle on a yellow field
	1077–1420	Flag of the Patriarchate of Aquileia	A golden eagle on a blue field
	1102–1172	Flag of the Kingdom of Hungary	A red flag with a white Latin cross in the center.
	1172–1196	Flag of the Kingdom of Hungary	A red flag with a white patriarchal cross in the center.
	1196–1301	Flag of the Kingdom of Hungary	A red flag with a white patriarchal cross on a green triple mount in the center.
	1196–1301	Flag of the Árpád dynasty	Eight horizontal stripes alternating red and white.
	1301–1382	Flag of the Kingdom of Hungary	Eight horizontal stripes alternating red and white with a yellow fleur-de-lis pattern on a vertical blue stripe at the hoist.
	1387–1437	Flag of the Kingdom of Hungary	A red flag divided into four quarters: eight horizontal stripes alternating white and red in the first and fourth quarters, a white eagle in the second quarter and a white lion in the third quarter.
	1401–1430	Imperial banner of the Holy Roman Emperor and flag of the Holy Roman Empire	An Imperial Eagle displayed with a halo sable armed and langued gules.
	1420–1797	Flag of the Republic of Venice	A gold Lion of St. Mark on a field of dark red with a six-tongued fringe at the fly.
	1430–1804	Imperial banner of the Holy Roman Emperor and flag of the Holy Roman Empire	A black double-headed eagle with haloes on a yellow field.
	1440–1444	Flag of the Kingdom of Hungary	A red flag divided into four quarters: eight horizontal stripes alternating white and red in the first and fourth quarters and a white eagle in the second and third quarters.
	1458–1490	Flag of the Kingdom of Hungary	A red swallow-tailed flag divided into four quarters: eight horizontal stripes alternating white and red in the first and fourth quarters, a white patriarchal cross on a green triple mount in the second quarter, a white lion in the third quarter and the coat of arms of the Hunyadi family in the center.
	1458–1490	Flag of the Kingdom of Hungary	A red swallow-tailed flag divided into four quarters: eight horizontal stripes alternating white and red in the first quarter, a white patriarchal cross on a green triple mount in the second quarter, three crowned golden leopards' heads on a blue field in the third quarter, a white lion in the fourth quarter and the coat of arms of the Hunyadi family in the center.
	1490–1516	Flag of the Kingdom of Hungary	A red swallow-tailed flag divided into four quarters: eight horizontal stripes alternating red and white in the first and fourth quarters and a white patriarchal cross on a green triple mount in the second and third quarters.
	1516–1526	Flag of the Kingdom of Hungary	A red swallow-tailed flag divided into four quarters: eight horizontal stripes alternating red and white in the first quarter, a white patriarchal cross on a green triple mount in the second quarter, three crowned golden leopards' heads on a blue field in the third quarter, a white lion in the fourth quarter and a white eagle on a red escutcheon in the center.
	1754–1815	Flag of the Princely County of Gorizia and Gradisca	A horizontal bicolour of white and red.
	1804–1918	Flag of the Habsburg monarchy and also the flag of the Austrian Empire. Sometimes used as the unofficial national flag of Austria-Hungary.	A horizontal bicolour of black and yellow.
	1809–1813	Flag of the First French Empire	A vertical tricolour of blue, white, and red (proportions 3:2).
	1809–1813	Flag of the Napoleonic Italy	A composition formed by a green rectangle inserted in a white diamond, in turn included in a red box, with an imperial eagle in the center.
	1815–1866	Flag of the German Confederation	A tricolour, made of three equal horizontal bands coloured black (top), red, and gold (bottom).
	1815–1816	Flag of the Kingdom of Lombardy–Venetia	A yellow field bordered with black triangles and with the Austrian Eagle in the center.
	1816–1848	Flag of the Kingdom of Illyria	A horizontal bicolour of white and red with the Austrian eagle in the center.
	1848–1918	Flag of the Duchy of Carniola	A horizontal tricolour of white, blue, and red.
	1849	Flag of the Hungarian State	A horizontal tricolor of red, white, and green with the state coat of arms in the center.
	1849–1918	Flag of the Austrian Littoral	A horizontal tricolour of yellow, red, and blue with the coat of arms in the center.
	1850–1918	Flag of the Imperial Free City of Trieste	A horizontal tricolour of red (top), white, and red with a golden spear in the center.
	1869–1918	Merchant flag of Austria-Hungary	A horizontal triband of red, white, and red / green with the Austrian escutcheon on the hoist side and the crowned small coat of arms of Hungary on the fly side.
	1869–1874	Flag of the Kingdom of Hungary	A horizontal tricolor of red, white, and green with the crowned small coat of arms in the center.
	1874–1896	Flag of the Kingdom of Hungary	A horizontal tricolor of red, white, and green with the crowned small coat of arms in the center.
	1896–1915	Flag of the Kingdom of Hungary	A horizontal tricolor of red, white, and green with the crowned small coat of arms flanked by two angels in the center.
	1896–1915	Civil flag of the Kingdom of Hungary	A horizontal tricolor of red, white, and green with the combined coat of arms of the Lands of the Holy Hungarian Crown in the center.
	1915–1918; 1941–1944	Flag of the Kingdom of Hungary	A horizontal tricolor of red, white, and green with the crowned small coat of arms in the center.
	1915–1918	Civil flag of the Kingdom of Hungary	A horizontal tricolor of red, white, and green with the combined coat of arms of the Lands of the Holy Hungarian Crown in the center.
	1918	Flag of the State of Slovenes, Croats and Serbs	A horizontal tricolour of red, white, and blue.
	1918–1941	Flag of the Kingdom of Yugoslavia	Three equal horizontal bands in the pan-Slavic colors, blue (top), white, and red.
	1941–1943; 1945–1947	Flag of the Kingdom of Italy	An Italian tricolour with Savoy shield and Royal crown in the middle.
	1941–1945	Flag of the Independent State of Croatia	A tricolour of red, white, and blue with the Ustaše symbol in top-left corner (letter "U" surrounded by Croatian interlace) and the Croatian coat of arms (but with the first field white, as opposed to red) in the center. The flag used Ustaše colors, proportions 2:3.
	1941–1945	Flag of Nazi Germany	A red field, with a white disc with a black swastika at a 45-degree angle. Disk and swastika are slightly off-centre.
	1941–1946	Flag of the Slovene Partisans	Three equal horizontal bands, white (top), blue, and red, with a red star in the central white band.
	1943–1945	Flag of the Slovene Home Guard	The flag often featured a standard horizontal tricolor with the emblem or shield placed in the center.
	1945–1946	Flag of the Democratic Federal Yugoslavia	Three equal horizontal bands in the pan-Slavic colors, blue (top), white, and red, with a red star in the central white band.
	1946–1991	Flag of the Socialist Federal Republic of Yugoslavia	Three equal horizontal bands in the pan-Slavic colors, blue (top), white, and red, with a yellow-bordered red star at the flag's center.
	1946–1991	Flag of the Socialist Republic of Slovenia	Three equal horizontal bands, white (top), blue, and red, with a yellow-bordered red star at the flag's center.
	1947–1954	Flag of the Free Territory of Trieste	A red field with a white spear in the center.

== Proposed flags ==
Flag	Date	Use	Description
	1945	Proposed flag of Slovenia presented by Jože Melaher Zmagoslav’s Blue Guard (Slovene Chetniks) as depicted in the periodical Kri in zemlja.	A horizontal tricolor of white, blue, and red, with a canton in the upper hoist corner containing three horizontal stripes (blue, white, and red).
	1990	Flag proposal in 1990 before independence by the Party of Democratic Reform.	A horizontal tricolor of white, blue, and red; charged with a yellow star at the middle.

In 2003, a campaign was started to partially or completely alter the flag in order to enhance Slovenia's international recognition, and especially to differentiate it from those of Russia and Slovakia. An eleven-striped design won the official contest. However, public opinion seems to be strongly against changing the flag at the moment.

== See also ==
- Flag of Slovenia
- Coat of arms of Slovenia
