= List of Belarusian flags =

The following is a list of flags of Belarus.

== National flag ==
Flag	Date	Use	Description
	2012–present	National flag and ensign	An unequal horizontal bicolor of red over green in a 2:1 ratio, with a thicker red ornamental pattern on a white vertical stripe at the hoist.
	2012–present	Vertical display	The obverse side, turned so that the green band is on the left, red on the right, and the thicker ornamental pattern is at the top.

== Presidential flag ==
Flag	Date	Use	Description
	1997–2012	Presidential flag	
	2012–present	Presidential flag	

=== Presidential institutions ===
Flag	Date	Use	Description
		Flag of Academy of Public Administration under the aegis of the President of the Republic of Belarus	
		Flag of National Academy of Sciences of Belarus	
		Flag of State Forensic Examination Committee of the Republic of Belarus	

== Military flags ==
Flag	Date	Use	Description
	2007–present	Flag of the General Staff of the Armed Forces of Belarus	
	1995–2012	Flag of the Armed Forces	
	2012–present	Flag of the Armed Forces	Ornament pattern modified in 2012.
	?–present	Flag of the Presidential Security Service of Belarus	The obverse of the flag bears the coat of arms of Belaurs and the inscription "Служба бяспекі прэзідэнта" (Presidential Security Service).
	?–present	Reverse flag	The reverse of the flag bears the emblem of the Presidential Secret Service of Belarus and the inscription "Абавязак. Гонар. Айчына." (Duty. Honor. Fatherland.).
	March 8, 2005 – present	Flag of the Land Forces	Red, with emblem of the Land Forces in full colors in the center.
Flag VVS i PVO RB	2005–present	Flag of the Air Forces	Air force emblem corresponding to 2/5 of the total flag-width, placed on a blue field with yellow beams.
	2003–present	Flag of DOSAAF	Emblem of the Voluntary Society of Assistance to the Army, the Air Force and the Navy of the Republic of Belarus, centered on a sky-blue background.
		Flag of the Special Forces of Belarus	

== Governmental flags ==
Flag	Date	Use	Description
	2018–present	Ministry of Foreign Affairs	
	2023-present	Ministry of Internal Affairs	
	2018–present	Ministry of Labour and Social Protection	
	2018–present	Ministry of Economy	
	2018–present	Ministry of Agriculture and Food	
	December 9, 1991 – present	Ministry of Emergency Situations	
	2000–2009	Border Guard	Green with a red saltire.
	2000–2009	Chairman of State Committee of the Border Guard	Green with a red saltire with the State coat of arms in the center.
	2000–2009	Chief of Staff of Border Guard	Green with a red saltire with the Border Guard emblem in the center.
	March 5, 2001 – present	State Committee of Aviation	Blue with a triangle, in the center of which the symbol of the SCA is placed.
	1993–2001	Customs	White-red-white flag with a Pahonia with a green border on the fly. Adopted in 1993, likely replaced between 1995–2001
	March 5, 2001 – present	Customs	Green flag with the emblem of the Belarusian customs in the center.
	March 5, 2001 – present	Vitebsk Customs	

== Subdivision flags ==
Flag	Administrative division	Adopted	Description
	Minsk City	2001	Blue with the Minsk Coat of Arms of 1591 in the center.
	Brest Region	2004	Blue with a yellow zoubre (Bison bonasus) on a red stylized tower (coat of arms of the Region of Brest).
	Gomel Region	2005	Green with the coat of arms of the Region of Homyel (Gomel) (only in the centre of an obverse side of the flag).
	Grodno Region	2007	Red with the coat of arms of the Region of Hrodna (only in the centre of an obverse side of the flag).
	Mogilev Region	2005	Red with the coat of arms of the Region of Mogilyov (only in the centre of an obverse side of the flag).
	Minsk Region	2007	Red with the coat of arms of the Region of Minsk (only in the centre of an obverse side of the flag).
	Vitebsk Region	2009	Green with the coat of arms of the Region of Vitsebsk (only in the centre of an obverse side of the flag).

== Political flags ==
Flag	Date	Party	Description
Current
	2007–present	Belaya Rus	
	2005–present	Belarusian Social Democratic Party	
	2004–present	Right Alliance and Belarusian Freedom Party	
	1999–present	Conservative Christian Party – BPF	
	1996–present	Communist Party of Belarus	Flag of the Byelorussian Soviet Socialist Republic (1951–1991).
	1994–present	Liberal Democratic Party of Belarus	
	1994–present	Republican Party	
	1992–present	Belarusian Agrarian Party	
	?–present	National Bolshevik Party of Belarus	
Former
	1995–1999	Belarusian Peasant Party	
	1919–1930s	Belarusian Peasant Party "Green Oak"^{be}	
Other
	2020	A variant of the 1991–1995 flag of Belarus, used by pro-democracy protestors.	A white-red-white flag with the Pahonia coat of arms in the centre.
	2017–present	Flag of Veyshnoria, used as an element of satire.	
	2000s	Pro-Union State flag	

== Minority flags ==
Flag	Date	Use	Description
		Flags of Lipka Tatars	A white-red-white flag with a crescent moon and a five-pointed star.
		Flags of Lipka Tatars	Based on the flag of the Golden Horde.

== Historical flags ==
Flag	Date	Use	Description
	Since 1918 (in exile after 1919)	White-red-white flag of the Belarusian Democratic Republic	A horizontal triband of white (top and bottom) and red.
	1919–1925	Belarusian Democratic Republic (in exile)	White with a red horizontal band of red, the central red stripe being bordered by a thin black stripes. In use besides the regular white-red-white flag. Black stripes are believed to symbolize mourning.
	1919–1920	Socialist Soviet Republic of Lithuania and Belorussia	Plain red flag.
	1919	Flag of The Second Polish Republic	
	1919–1927	Flag of the Socialist Soviet Republic of Byelorussia	
	1927–1937	Flag of the Byelorussian Soviet Socialist Republic	
	1937–1940	Flag of the Byelorussian Soviet Socialist Republic	
	1942–1944	Belarusian Central Council	
	1943–1945	Union of Belarusian Youth	
	1944–1951	Flag of the Byelorussian Soviet Socialist Republic	
	1951–1991	Flag of the Byelorussian Soviet Socialist Republic	An unequal horizontal bicolour of red over green in a 2:1 ratio and a golden hammer, sickle, and bordered star on the canton, with a white ornamental pattern on a red vertical stripe at the hoist.
	1951–1991	Reverse flag	All flags of the constituent republics of the Soviet Union did not bear the hammer and sickle on their reverse side.
	1991–1995	Civil and state flag, civil and state ensign	A horizontal triband of white (top and bottom) and red. Used in opposition to the current government.
	1995–2012	National flag and ensign	An unequal horizontal bicolor of red over green in a 2:1 ratio, with a thinner red ornamental pattern on a white vertical stripe at the hoist.

== See also ==
- Flag of Belarus
- Coat of arms of Belarus
