= Brokey Yacht Club =

Icelandic yacht club

- Burgee
- Founded: 1971
- Location: Reykjavík Iceland
- Commodore: Gunnar Sigurðsson
- Website: http://brokey.is

Brokey Yacht Club, Reykjavík (Siglingafélag Reykjavíkur, Brokey officially in Icelandic) is a yacht club located in Reykjavík, Iceland, focusing on sailing. It has a keelboat marina in Reykjavík Harbour and dinghy facilities in Nauthólsvík. The Brokey marina, situated behind the Harpa concert hall, is a popular stop for sailboats cruising to Iceland and Greenland.

The club was founded by a small group of sailing enthusiasts in 1971. It is now one of the largest yacht clubs in Iceland with over 150 members. Brokey organises several regattas during the summer, including an informal weekly race just outside the harbour every Tuesday.

Brokey Yacht Club is a member of the Icelandic Sailing Association and the Reykjavík Sports Union.

== Links ==
- Official website
