= List of Slovak flags =

This is a list of flags used in Slovakia.

== Current flags ==
=== National flag ===
Flag	From	Use	Description	Ratio
	3 September 1992	National flag	A horizontal tricolor of white, blue, and red; charged with coat of arms at the hoist side.	2:3
	3 September 1992	National flag for vertical display	A vertical tricolor of white, blue, and red; the coat of arms is rotated relative to the flag so that it is still upright, and is shifted towards the top.	2:3

=== Governmental flags ===
Flag	From	Use	Description	Ratio
	1 January 1993	Flag of the President	Coat of arms of Slovakia in banner from, with a narrow white border and a wide border with oblique stripes in white, blue, and red.	1:1

=== Subnational flags ===
==== Regional flags ====
Flag	Adopted	Administrative division
		Bratislava Region
		Trnava Region
		Trenčín Region
		Nitra Region
		Žilina Region
		Banská Bystrica Region
		Prešov Region
		Košice Region

== Historical flags ==
Flag	Date	Use
	1848	Flag from Demands of the Slovak Nation from 11 May 1848.
	1848–1849	Flag used by the Slovak volunteer corps during the Slovak uprising in 1848–1849. Later it became the flag of the Slovak National Council.
	1848	One of the flags, where the double cross was no longer green, but blue three-peaked, first used in 1848 during the autumn campaign.
	1848–1849	Another Slovak flag used during the revolution.
	1868; 1919–1938; 1938–1939; 1939–1945; 1990–1992	The flag with this order of colors was used from 1848/1849 and was officially established in 1868 as the flag of the Slovaks. It was widely used by Slovaks living in the United States and American Slovak associations. In the years 1919–1938 it was the unofficial flag of Slovakia, and in the years 1938–1939 the official flag of the autonomous Slovak Country. In the years 1939–1945 the official flag of the Slovak Republic and in the period 1990–1992 the official flag of the Slovak Republic within the Czech Republic.
		Czecho-Slovak flag from the design of Milan Rastislav Štefánik, which was later used as the flag of the Czechoslovak National Council.
	1918–1920	The flag of the First Czechoslovak Republic in the years 1918–1920, which was based on the national flag of Bohemia. According to the CNR Act 67/1990 Coll. was also the official but practically unused flag of the Czech Republic within the Czechoslovakia from 13 March 1990 to 31 December 1992.
	16 June – 7 July 1919	The flag of the Slovak Soviet Republic, which existed only for a short time (from 16 June to 7 July 1919).
	1920–1992	The flag of Czechoslovakia in the years 1920 to 1992 and also the official flag of Czech Republic from 1 January 1993.
	1939–1945	War flag Slovak Republic (1939–1945).
	1944	The flag of Platoon 535 used during the Warsaw Uprising.
Czechoslovak Legion in Russia Flag	1917–1918	The obverse side of the flag of the Czechoslovak Legion in Russia, with the reverse side being the russian flag.
Czechoslovak Legion in France Flag	1914–1915; 1917–1918	The flag used by the Czechoslovak units in the French Foreign Legion, with the legion being disbanded in 1915 due to heavy casualties and then reestablished again in 1917.
Czechoslovak Legion in Italy Flag	1918	The flag used by the Czechoslovak Legion in Italy.
Banner of the First Assault Battalion of the Czechoslovak Legions	1917–1918	The obverse side of the flag used by the First Assault Battalion of the Czechoslovak Legions in Russia.
Czechoslovak People's Army Flag	1960–1990	The reverse side of the flag of the Czechoslovak People's Army, with the obverse side using various military flags.
Second independent parachute brigade in the USSR	1944	The obverse side of the flag used by the Second independent parachute brigade in the USSR during the Slovak National Uprising with the flag being lost in December 1944 and only a replica existing.
Flag of the 2nd Czechoslovak regiment Tatranský	1917–1920	The flag of the 2nd Czechoslovak regiment Tatranský of the Czechoslovak Legion in Russia. The other side has a bohemian lion on a red background instead.

== Political flags ==
Flag	Date	Party	Description
current
	2021–present	Republic Movement	
	2019–present	For the People	
	2018–present 2015–2018	People's Party Our Slovakia	
	2018–present	Communist Party of Slovakia	
	1990–present	Christian Democratic Movement	
	1990–present	Slovak National Party	
former
	2005–2006	Slovak Togetherness	
Link to file	1990–2004	Party of the Democratic Left	
	1938–1945	German Party	
	1913–1945	Slovak People's Party and Hlinka Guard	
Czechoslovakia
	?–1990	Communist Party of Czechoslovakia	

== Ethnic Group Flags ==
Flag	Date	Use	Description
	?–present	Flag of the Carpathian Germans	

== See also ==
- List of Czech flags
- Flag of Slovakia
- Coat of arms of Slovakia
- National symbols of Slovakia
