= List of Monégasque flags =

The following is a list of flags and banners used in the Principality of Monaco. For more information about the national flag, see Flag of Monaco.

== National flags ==
Flag	Date	Use	Description
	4 April 1881 – present	National flag	A horizontal bicolour of red and white.
	4 April 1881 – present	State flag	A white field with the coat of arms charged at the center.
	17th century – present	Lozenge flag	A white field with red lozenges.

== Royal flags ==
Flag	Date	Use	Description
	1945–present	Princely flag of Monaco	A white field with the coat of arms charged at the center.
	2005–present	Royal standard of Albert II	A white field with the monogram of Albert II in the center.
	1949–2005	Royal standard of Rainier III	A white field with the monogram of Rainier III in the center.

== Municipal flags ==
Flag	Date	Use	Description
		Flag of the Municipality of Monaco	A white field with coat of arms.

== Historical flags ==
Flag	Date	Use	Description
	987–1034	Banner of the Kingdom of France	A simple blue field.
	1034–1215	Banner of the Holy Roman Empire	A black eagle on a yellow field.
	1339–1353	Flag of the Republic of Genoa	A white field with centred red cross, similar to the Flag of England.
	1353–1419	Flag of the Crown of Aragon	Nine alternating horizontal stripes of yellow and red.
	1419–1428; 1688–1793	Flag of Monaco	A white field with red lozenges.
	1428–1447; 1450–1498	Flag of the Duchy of Milan	The Imperial Eagle of the Holy Roman Empire in the first and fourth quarters and the Snake of Milan in the second and third quarters.
	1447–1450	Flag of the Golden Ambrosian Republic	A white field with red centered cross and the emblem of the republic in the center.
	1498–1525	Flag of the Kingdom of France	A blue field with three golden fleur-de-lis.
	1525–1641	Flag of Habsburg Spain	A red saltire resembling two crossed, roughly-pruned (knotted) branches, on a white field.
	1641–1688	Flag of the Kingdom of France	A white field with several fleur-de-lis and the royal coat of arms in the center.
	1793–1814	Flag of the French First Republic and the First French Empire	A vertical tricolour of blue, white, and red (proportions 3:2).
	1814–1881	Flag of Monaco	A white field with the princely arms in the center.
	1815–1816	Flag of the Kingdom of Sardinia	Blue with a canton containing the cross of savoy and two St George's Crosses in the first and fourth quarters (the first with four heads of Moors).
	1816–1848	Flag of the Kingdom of Sardinia	Blue with a combination of the crosses of savoy and St George occupying one quarter of the field and placed in the canton.
	1848–1861	Flag of the Kingdom of Sardinia	An Italian tricolour with House of Savoy shield in the center.
	1881–1942	Flag of Monaco	A horizontal bicolour of red and white.
	1942–1943	Flag of the Kingdom of Italy	An Italian tricolour with Savoy shield and Royal crown in the middle.
	1943–1945	Flag of Nazi Germany	A red field, with a white disc with a black swastika at a 45-degree angle. Disk and swastika are slightly off-centre towards the hoist.

== Yacht clubs ==
Flag	Club
	Yacht Club de Monaco

== See also ==
- Flag of Monaco
- Coat of arms of Monaco
