= List of flags of Luxembourg =

This is a list of flags used in the Grand Duchy of Luxembourg, a country in western Europe. For more information about the national flag, visit the article Flag of Luxembourg.

== National flag ==
Flag	Date	Use	Description
	1993–present	Flag of Luxembourg (Ratio: 3:5)	A horizontal tricolor of red, white, and blue. De facto used from 1848, but it was not officially adopted until 1993.
	1972–1993	Flag of Luxembourg (Ratio: 1:2)	The national flag in 1:2 ratio.

== Ensign ==
Flag	Date	Use	Description
	1972–present	Civil ensign and civil air ensign of Luxembourg	The Roude Liéw, a banner of the coat of arms of Luxembourg. It has ten horizontal white and blue stripes, superimposed by a red lion with yellow claws, teeth, tongue, and crown.

== Standard of the Grand Duke ==
Flag	Date	Use	Description
	2001–present	Standard of the Grand Duke	An orange flag with the middle coat of arms of the Grand Duke.

== Cities ==
Flag	Date	Use	Description
		Flag of Luxembourg City	
		Flag of Betzdorf	
		Flag of Diekirch	

== Historical flags ==
Flag	Date	Use	Description
	800–888	The Imperial Oriflamme of Charlemagne	A three-tailed green flag with eight golden crosses and six flowers.
	1214–1242	Flag of the Duchy of Limburg	A banner of arms of Limburg. It is made of a white field with a green stripe on the hoist and a red lion with yellow claws, teeth, tongue, and crown.
	1242–1443	Flag of the County and Duchy of Luxemburg	A banner of arms of Luxembourg. It is made of ten horizontal white and blue stripes with a red lion with yellow claws, teeth, tongue, and crown.
	1443–1556	Flag of the Duchy of Burgundy under Philip the Good	A banner of the coat of arms of the Duchy of Burgundy under the House of Valois-Burgundy
	1556–1684; 1698–1700	Flag of the Seventeen Provinces, the Southern Netherlands, and the Spanish Netherlands	A red saltire resembling two crossed, roughly-pruned (knotted) branches, on a white field.
	1556–1684; 1698–1700	Civil ensign of the Spanish Netherlands	A horizontal tricolour of red, white, and yellow, with the Cross of Burgundy in the centre.
	1684–1698; 1701–1711	Flag of the Kingdom of France	A white field with several fleur-de-lis.
	1814–1815; 1815–1830	Flag of the Kingdom of France	Royal standard of Louis XVIII and Charles X
	1711–1713	Flag of the Electorate of Bavaria	A quartered banner of arms. The first and fourth quarters have an array of lozenges of blue and white. The second and third quarters are the lion of the Electorate of the Palatinate. Over these in the center, an inescutcheon with a golden orb on a red field.
	1713–1795	Flag of the Archduchy of Austria	Three equal horizontal bands of red (top), white, and red.
	1713–1740	Flag of the Archduchy of Austria	A yellow field with a black double headed eagle with a crown on top and carrying a shield with the red and white triband of Austria on his chest.
	1781–1786	Flag of the Austrian Netherlands	A tricolour, with three equal horizontal bands of red, white, and gold with the arms of Austria.
	1789–1790	Flag of the Brabant Revolution	A tricolour, with three equal horizontal bands of red, black, and yellow.
	1795–1814	Flag of the French First Republic and the First French Empire	A vertical tricolour of blue, white, and red (proportions 3:2).
	1815–1830; 1839–1848	Flag of the United Kingdom of the Netherlands and the Kingdom of the Netherlands	A horizontal triband of red, white, and blue.
	1830–1831	Flag of the Belgian Revolution	A tricolour, with three equal horizontal bands of black, yellow, and red.
	1831–1839	Flag of the Kingdom of Belgium	A vertical tricolour of black, yellow, and red with a 2:3 ratio.
	1848–1940; 1944–1972	Flag of Luxembourg	
	1940–1945	Flag of Nazi Germany used during the occupation of Luxembourg in World War II	A red field, with a white disc with a black swastika at a 45-degree angle. Disc and swastika are shifted towards the hoist.

== Historical royal flags ==
Flag	Date	Use	Description
	1556	Banner of arms of King Charles I	
	1556	Banner of arms of Emperor Charles V	
	1556	Banner of arms of Emperor Charles V	
	1556–1580; 1668–1684; 1698–1700	Royal standard or royal flag of the House of Habsburg.	
	1580–1668	Banner of arms of the House of Austria (with the arms of Portugal).	
	1580–1668	Royal standard or royal flag of the House of Habsburg. (Inescutcheon of Portugal in the royal arms)	
	1668–1684; 1698–1700	Banner of arms of the House of Austria (from 1668)	
	1684–1698; 1701–1711	Royal standard of Louis XIV	
	1804–1814	Imperial standard of Napoléon I	
	1814–1815	Royal standard of Louis XVIII	
	1815–1830; 1839–1848	Royal standard of the Dutch Monarch	
	1815–1835	Standard of Emperor Francis	
	1848–1866	Standard of the Emperor Franz Joseph	
