= List of Swiss flags =

This is a comprehensive list of flags used in Switzerland.

== National flags ==
Flag	Date	Use	Description
	1841–present	National flag of Switzerland	A square flag with a white cross in the centre and background in red.
	1882–present	Civil and state ensign	Red flag with a white cross in the centre and background in red.

== Ethnic group flags ==
Flag	Date	Use	Description
		Flag of the Piedmontese Arpitans	
		Flag of the Yenish people	
		Proposed flag of the Romansh people	

== Military flags ==
=== Rank flags ===
Flag	Date	Use	Description
	1898	Flag of a Swiss Armed Forces general and Chief of the Armed Forces	A white cross on a red background.
	1898	Flag of a Swiss Armed Forces lieutenant general	
		Obsolete flag of a Swiss Armed Forces lieutenant general	
	1898	Flag of a Swiss Armed Forces major general	
		Obsolete flag of a Swiss Armed Forces major general	
	1898	Flag of a Swiss Armed Forces brigadier general	
		Obsolete flag of a Swiss Armed Forces brigadier general	

== Political flags ==
Flag	Date	Use	Description
	1966–1992	Flag of the Autonomous Socialist Party (Ticino)	

== Historical flags ==
=== Switzerland under the Holy Roman Empire ===
Flag	Date	Use	Description
	800–888	Imperial Oriflamme of Charlemagne	A three-tailed green field with eight golden crosses and six flowers.
	800–1300	Banner of the Emperor of the Romans and of the King of Germany	A black Imperial Eagle on a yellow field.
	1100–1300	War flag of the Holy Roman Empire	A non-rectangular flag depicting a white cross on a red field.

=== Historical national flags ===
Flag	Date	Use	Description
	1291–1422	Old flag of Unterwalden	A horizontal bicolor of red and white.
	1291–1422	Old flag of Uri	A yellow field with a black bull, similar to the modern flag.
	1291–1422	Old flag of Lucerne	A horizontal bicolor of white and blue.
	1291–1422	Old flag of Zurich	A diagonal bicolor of white and blue with a large red horizontal stripe.
	1291–1422	Old flag of Glarus	A red field with a monk in the center.
	1291–1422	Old flag of Zug	A horizontal triband of white (top), blue, and white.
	1291–1422	Old flag of Bern	A diagonal triband of red (top), yellow and red with a bear inside the yellow stripe.
	1350–1836	Old flag of Neuchâtel	A yellow field with a red vertical stripe in the center which has three arrowed white stripes.
	1422–1475	First flag of the Old Swiss Confederacy	A red triangular field with a white cross off-centered towards the hoist.
	1475–1798	Second flag of the Old Swiss Confederacy	A square red flag with a white cross in the centre.
	1628–1798	Flag of the Republic of the Seven Tithings	A square vertical bicolor of white and red with seven six-pointed stars.
	1792–1798	Flag of the Republic of Geneva	A square field of two horizontal bands of red and gold with a thin black stripe between them.
	1803–1930	Old flag of Argau	A vertical bicolor of black with three rivers, and blue with three five-pointed stars.
	1814–1822	Flag of the Restored Swiss Confederacy	A square red flag with a white cross in the centre, with the German words "Für Vaterland und Ehre" which means "For Fatherland and Honor" and a sword intertwined by a laurel plant in the center of the cross.
	1836–1848	Old flag of Neuchâtel	A horizontal tricolor of orange, black, and white.

=== Swiss territories under Prussian rule ===
Flag	Date	Use	Description
	1707–1772	Flag of Royal Prussia	
	1707–1750	First flag of the Kingdom in Prussia	
	1750–1801	Second flag of the Kingdom in Prussia and first flag of the Kingdom of Prussia	A black eagle holding a sword and rod on a white field, a crown on top.
	1801–1803	Second flag of the Kingdom of Prussia	
	1803–1805; 1815–1848	Third flag of the Kingdom of Prussia	The same as the previous flag, but the crown in the top of the flag is smaller.

=== Swiss territories under Austrian rule ===
Flag	Date	Use	Description
	1453–1458	Flag of the Archduchy of Austria	Three equal horizontal bands of red (top), white, and red.

=== Swiss territories under French rule ===
Flag	Date	Use	Description
Pre-Napoleonic Era
	1482–1493	Flag of the Kingdom of France	A square blue field with three fleur de lis
	1499–1512	Flag of the Kingdom of France	A rectangular blue field with three fleur de lis
	1604–1790	Flag of the Kingdom of France	A white banner with several fleur de lis and the royal coat of arms in the center.
	1790–1794	Flag of the Kingdom of France and the French First Republic	A vertical tricolour of red, white, and blue.
	1794–1804	Flag of the French First Republic	A vertical tricolour of blue, white, and red.
	1798–1803	Flag of the Helvetic Republic (German)	A green-red-yellow tricolour with the name of the country in German.
	1798–1803	Flag of the Helvetic Republic (French)	A green-red-yellow tricolour with the name of the country in French.
	1802–1804	Flag of the Rhodanic Republic	A square vertical bicolor of white and red with 12 five-pointed stars.
Napoleonic Era
	1804–1814	Flag of the First French Empire	
	1804–1814	Flag of the Napoleonic Valais	

=== Swiss territories under Italian states ===
Flag	Date	Use	Description
	1093–1329	Flag of the commune of Milan	A white field with a red Maltese cross in the center and a three-tongued fringe at the fly.
	1329–1395	Flag of the Lordship of Milan	A white field with a blue snake devouring a child in the center.
	1395–1512	Flag of the Duchy of Milan	A white field with centred red cross, similar to the flag of England.
	1395–1447; 1450–1499	Flag of Milan under the Holy Roman Empire	The Imperial Eagle of the Holy Roman Empire in the first and fourth quarters and the Snake of Milan in the second and third quarters.
	1447–1450	Flag of the Golden Ambrosian Republic	A white field with centred red cross, with the republic's seal.
	1499–1512	Flag of Milan under the Kingdom of France	The French royal flag in the first and fourth quarters and the Snake of Milan in the second and third quarters.
	1416–1536	Flag of the Duchy of Savoy	A red field with centred white cross.

== Yacht club flags ==
Flag	Club
	Burgee of Club Nautico Morcote
	Burgee of Cruising Club der Schweiz
	Société Nautique de Genève
	Cruising Club der Schweiz

== See also ==
- Flag of Switzerland
- Coat of arms of Switzerland
