= List of Bulgarian flags =

The following is a list of flags of Bulgaria.

== National flag ==
Flag	Date	Use	Description
	1878–present	National flag and civil ensign	A horizontal tricolor of white, green and red.
	1879–present	Wartime flag	A horizontal tricolor of red, green and white.
	?–present	Digital flag	A horizontal tricolor of white, green and red. Version with colors meant for digital renderings.
	1990–present	Hanging national flag	Vertical version of the tricolor.

== Government flags ==
=== Standards of Royal Family ===
Flag	Date	Use	Description
	1937–1946	Standard of the Tsar	

== Military flags ==
=== Bulgarian Land Forces ===
Flag	Date	Use	Description
	1971–1990	War flag	A red flag with the Bulgarian coat of arms from the communist time with the motto: "For our socialist motherland".
	1991–present	War flag	A green and red flag with the middle part of the coat of arms.

=== Bulgarian Navy ===
==== Republic of Bulgaria ====
Flag	Date	Use	Description
	1991–2005	Naval ensign	The old naval ensign from 1954–1990 but in place of the red star is the Bulgarian lion used in the old monarchical naval ensigns.
	2005–present	Naval ensign	The old naval ensign from 1991–2005 but the lion is smaller and placed in a red canton.
	1991–present	Naval Jack	A red cross and a green cross in a white background.
		Coast Guard ensign	A green field with the naval ensign from 1991–2005 in the canton.
		Commander of the Navy	A red field with the naval ensign in the canton and three white five-pointed stars in the other three corners.
		Deputy Commander of the Navy	A red field with the naval ensign in the canton and two white five-pointed stars in the top and bottom fly corners.
		Commander of the Naval Base	A red field with the naval ensign in the canton and a white five-pointed star in the bottom fly corner.

==== People's Republic of Bulgaria ====
Flag	Date	Use	Description
	1949–1955	Naval ensign	The old naval ensign flag but in bottom hoist corner a red star in a white background and a modified lion.
	1955–1990	Naval ensign	A mostly white flag with green and red stripes at the bottom and a big red star in the top hoist corner.
	1949–1955	Naval jack	A red square flag with a white outline of a star and the Bulgarian lion in the center.
	1955–1963	Naval jack	The old naval jack from 1949–1955 in 2:3 ratio and without the lion.
	1963–1990	Naval jack	The old naval jack but in 1:2 ratio.
	1908–1944	Minister of War	The Bulgarian flag with the lion on a red background in the top hoist corner and a green saltire on a white background in the bottom hoist corner.

==== Kingdom of Bulgaria ====
Flag	Date	Use	Description
	1879–1944	Naval ensign	The Bulgarian flag with a lion on a red background in the top hoist corner.
	1879–1949	Naval Jack	A square flag with a red and green cross in a white background.
	1878–1944	Minister of War	

== Vexillology Association flags ==
Flag	Date	Use	Description
		Flag of the Bulgarian Heraldry and Vexillology Society	

== Political flags ==
Flag	Date	Party	Description
Current
	2014–present	Bulgarian National Union – New Democracy	
	2014–present	The Bulgarian Revival	The Bulgarian lion on a white background.
	2006–present	Citizens for European Development of Bulgaria	
	2005–present	Attack	
	1991–present	VMRO – Bulgarian National Movement	
	1991–present	VMRO – Bulgarian National Movement	Alternate flag with the coat of arms of the party
	1999–present	Bulgarian National Union	National flag with Tamgha of the Dulo clan.
		Bulgarian Agrarian National Union	
Former
	1944–1990	Dimitrovist Pioneer Organization "Septemberists"	Red flag with the emblem of the organization in the middle
	1944–1947	Bulgarian Fatherland Front	
	1936–1944	Ratniks	
	1932–1944	Union of Bulgarian National Legions	
	1932–1934	Bulgarian National Socialist Workers Party	
	1919–1990	Bulgarian Communist Party	

== Religious flags ==
Flag	Date	Party	Description
	?–present	Flag of Bulgarian General Mufti	

== Ethnic groups flags ==
Flag	Date	Use	Description
		Flag of the Bulgarian Turks	
		Flag of the Pomaks	Flag of former Republic of Tamrash
		Flag of the Sarakatsani	Flag of the Sarakatsani

== Historical flags ==
Flag	Date	Use	Description
	c. 1325	Flag of the Second Bulgarian Empire	Flag according to Angelino Dalorto
	c. 1380	Flag of the Second Bulgarian Empire	Flag according to Guillem Soler
	14th century	Flag of the Tsardom of Vidin	
	1878–1886	Flag of the Republic of Tamrash	
	1903	Flag of the Strandzha Commune	
	1879–1908	Flag of the Principality of Bulgaria	A horizontal tricolor of white-green-red
	1908–1946	Flag of the Kingdom of Bulgaria	A horizontal tricolor of white-green-red
	1946–1947	Flag of the People's Republic of Bulgaria	A horizontal tricolor of white-green-red
	1947–1948	Civil and state flag of the People's Republic of Bulgaria	A horizontal tricolor of white-green-red with the Bulgarian emblem in the top hoist corner
	1948–1968	Civil and state flag of the People's Republic of Bulgaria	A horizontal tricolor of white-green-red with the Bulgarian emblem in the top hoist corner
	1968–1971	Civil and state flag of the People's Republic of Bulgaria	A horizontal tricolor of white-green-red with the Bulgarian emblem in the top hoist corner
	1971–1990	Civil and state flag of the People's Republic of Bulgaria	A horizontal tricolor of white-green-red with the Bulgarian emblem in the top hoist corner

=== Other ===
Flag	Date	Use	Description
	1862–1868	The standard of the Bulgarian Legion	
	1876	Flag used in April Uprising	
red banner, on the far right yellow text reading "Awaken to liberation", in the middle a orange box with a black lion who has a red mane and above him is written in bent text "Macedonia" both quoted texts are in Bulgarian	1876	Flag used in Razlovci uprising	
	1877–1878	The standard of the Bulgarian Volunteer Corps	
	1877–	The standard of the Bulgarian Volunteer Corps	Samara Flag

== See also ==
- Flag of Bulgaria
- Coat of arms of Bulgaria
