= Flag of Akrotiri and Dhekelia =

The Union Flag is used in Akrotiri and Dhekelia for official purposes.

The Sovereign Base Areas of Akrotiri and Dhekelia has no official flag of its own and as a result is represented by the flag of the United Kingdom, the Union Jack. Akrotiri and Dhekelia is a British Overseas Territory on the island of Cyprus that comprises two military bases and their hinterland.

== History ==
The flag of British Cyprus

The Royal Air Force Ensign

The island of Cyprus was a British protectorate 1878–1914, under British military administration 1914–1922, then a Crown Colony 1922–1960. From 1922, the colonial flag of British Cyprus was in use throughout the island, including the areas now comprising Akrotiri and Dhekelia. Upon Cypriot independence in 1960, when the colonial flag ceased to have official usage, the territory of the Sovereign Base Areas was also established. However, no distinctive flag was created for Akrotiri and Dhekelia and no grant of arms by the College of Arms on which to base a Blue Ensign-type flag common to most British Overseas Territories. As a result, the Union Jack became the flag of Akrotiri and Dhekelia by default.

The Union Jack is flown over all official buildings in Akrotiri and Dhekelia as well as at border checkpoints. The Royal Air Force Ensign was sometimes used as a de facto flag locally because the Royal Air Force ran the bases and also because of local sensitivity towards the Union Jack.

Akrotiri and Dhekelia is one of only two British Overseas Territories without an official flag, the other being Saint Helena, Ascension and Tristan da Cunha (where each individual island has its own flag).

== Other flags ==
The Dhekelia Garrison flag

The flag of RAF Akrotiri

A green flag charged with two gold lions is often cited as an unofficial flag of Akrotiri and Dhekelia. This is the flag used by the Dhekelia Garrison, itself derived from the colonial flag of Cyprus. The two lions are from King Richard I of England's coat of arms, because of his conquest and creation of the Kingdom of Cyprus. The gold lions on green are widely used within the territory; they also appear on the coat of arms of the King Richard School and on the flag of the Dhekelia Sailing Club. RAF Akrotiri, a Royal Air Force base on the island, has its own flag. The seal depicts a flamingo (presumably a greater flamingo native to Cyprus) over water, with the Latin motto ACRA SEMPER ACRIA ("The peninsula is always eager").
