= List of Romanian flags =

The following is a list of flags used to represent Romania.

== National flag and state flag ==
Flag	Date	Use	Description
	1867–1947, 1989–present	National flag and ensign	A vertical tricolor of blue, yellow, and red. Current color scheme established in 1989. Ratio: 2:3
	1867–1947, 1989–present	Vertical display	Turned to place the blue band at the top.
	1867–1947, 1989–present	Vertical variant	Current color scheme established in 1995.

== Governmental flags ==
Flag	Date	Use	Description
	1990–present	Presidential flag	Ratio: 1:1 (unclear use status; seen scarcely during Naval Forces day)
	1990–present	Prime ministerial flag	Ratio: 1:1 (no longer seen in actual use)
	1990–present	Member of the Cabinet (early 1990s)	White with the national flag in the canton. The canton relative ratio is 4:5. (no longer seen in actual use)
	1991–present	Minister of Defense	Ratio: 1:1
	1990–present	Pilot ensign	National flag bordered white.

== Military flag ==
Flag	Date	Use	Description
	1992–present	Flag of the Armed Forces	State coat of arms in the center. In the flag's corners are two-branch wreaths.
	?–present	Flag of the Romanian General Staff	A yellow flag with the coat of arms of the Romanian General Staff in the centre with two stars to the left and to the right of the coat of arms. In the flag's corners are emblems of the Land, Naval, and Air Forces, with the combined emblem of all three in the canton.
	?–present	Flag of the Romanian Land Forces	A red flag with the coat of arms of the Romanian Land Forces in the centre with two stars to the left and to the right of the coat of arms and crossed swords in each corner of the flag.
	?–present	Flag of the Romanian Naval Forces	A dark blue flag with the coat of arms of the Romanian Naval Forces in the centre with two stars to the left and to the right of the coat of arms and foul anchors in each corner of the flag.
	?–present	Flag of the Romanian Air Force	A light blue flag with the coat of arms of the Romanian Air Force in the centre with two stars to the left and to the right of the coat of arms and air force elements in each corner of the flag.
		Naval jack	A light blue flag with the national flag in the canton and a vertically set black anchor in the fly
	?–present	Commissioning pennant	Tricolour long pennant of blue-yellow-red
	?–present	Chief of the General Staff	A square national tricolour with four white five-pointed stars one above another in the blue stripe.
	?–present	Chief of Naval Staff	A light blue flag with the national flag in the canton, a diagonally set black-outlined anchor in the fly upper quarter and four yellow five-pointed stars in a horizontal line in the lower half
	?–present	Deputy Chief of Naval Staff	A light blue flag with the national flag in the canton, a diagonally set black-outlined anchor in the fly upper quarter and three yellow five-pointed stars in a horizontal line in the lower half
	?–present	Fleet or Flotilla Commander	A light blue flag with the national flag in the canton, a diagonally set black-outlined anchor in the fly upper quarter and two yellow five-pointed stars in a horizontal line in the lower half
	?–present	Major Naval Unit Commander	A light blue flag with the national flag in the canton, a diagonally set black-outlined anchor in the fly upper quarter and one yellow five-pointed star in the lower half
	?–present	Naval Unit Commander	A triangular light blue pennant with the national tricolour near the hoist in the central part and in the fly a black outlined anchor, set vertically.

== Historical flags ==
Flag	Date	Use	Description
	c. 1593–1611	Flag of the Principality of Wallachia	
	1658–1659	Banner of Mihnea III as Prince of Wallachia	
	1678–1688	Banner of Șerban Cantacuzino as Prince of Wallachia	
	1700s	Naval ensign of the Principality of Wallachia	
	1758–1761	Banner of Scarlat Ghica as Prince of Wallachia	
	1802–1806	Banner of Constantine Ypsilantis as Prince of Wallachia	
	1818–1821	Banner of Alexander Soutzos as Prince of Wallachia	
	1822–1828	Banner of Grigore IV Ghica as Prince of Wallachia	
	1822–1828	Agia flag	
	1831–1849	Flag of the Principality of Wallachia	
	1834	War ensign of the Principality of Wallachia	
	1834	War ensign of the Principality of Wallachia	
	1834	War ensign of the Principality of Wallachia	
	1834–1861	Civil ensign of Wallachia	
	1840	War ensign of the Principality of Wallachia	
	1845	War ensign of the Principality of Wallachia	
	1848	Flag of the Provisional Government of the Principality of Wallachia	
	1849–1862	Flag of the Principality of Wallachia	
	1849	Flag of the 2nd Battalion of the 1st Infantry Regiment of Wallachia	
	1849	Standard of the 2nd Cavalry Division of Wallachia	
	1852	Infantry flag from Prahova County	
	1852	Infantry flag from Vlașca County	
	1859–1862	Civil ensign of the United Principalities of Moldavia and Wallachia	Blue-yellow-red horizontal tricolor with blue above.
	1862–1866	Civil ensign of the United Principalities of Romania	Red-yellow-blue horizontal tricolor with red above.
	1862–1866	Flag of the Prince of the United Principalities of Moldavia and Wallachia	Red-yellow-blue horizontal tricolor with red above. Coats of arms of Wallachia and Moldavia crowned and surrounded by Romanian tricolors.
	1863–1866	Army flag of the United Principalities of Romania and after 1866 Principality of Romania	Red-yellow-blue horizontal tricolor with red above. Flying crowned aquila with the coats of arms of Wallachia and Moldavia over it. The aquila holds the sceptre and the sword. In the corners, the monogram of prince Alexandru Ioan Cuza, surrounded by a laurel wreath. On the red scarf it is written: HONOR ET PATRIA.
	1866–1874	Army flag of the Principality of Romania	Red-yellow-blue horizontal tricolor with company's number in corners and name in the middle.
	1867–1872/3	Army flag of the Principality of Romania/Princely standard, official model. Used as military ensign. Not used as war or state flag.	Blue-yellow-red vertical tricolor with the country's coat of arms in the middle.
	1867–1875	Flag of Focșani civic guard.	Blue-yellow-red vertical tricolor with the city's coat of arms in the middle, and company number in corners.
	1877–1878	Used during the Romanian War of Independence.	Blue-yellow-red vertical tricolor with the medium country's coat of arms in the middle, on a purple background, surrounded by a laurel wreath. In corners, the monogram of king Carol I of Romania, crowned and surrounded by a laurel wreath. Ratio: 1:1.
	1867–1947	Civil ensign of the Principality/Kingdom of Romania	Blue-yellow-red vertical tricolor with blue near the hoist.
	8 January – 28 March 1948	Flag of the People's Republic of Romania (never used)	Provisional coat of arms established in January 1948. This is a reconstituted/theoretical model, as the "tractor" coat of arms was never used.
	1948–1952	Flag of the People's Republic of Romania	The arms had a scroll bearing the letters RPR (no red star).
	1952–1965	Flag of the People's Republic of Romania	The arms had a scroll bearing the letters RPR and were surmounted by a red star.
	1965–1989	Flag of the Socialist Republic of Romania	The arms had a scroll with the word REPUBLICA (left), SOCIALISTĂ (right) and ROMÂNIA (center) and were surmounted by a red star.
	1967–1989	Flag of Chairman of Councils of State and of Ministers of the Socialist Republic of Romania.	Ratio: 1:1
	22 December – 27 December 1989	De facto state flag and civil ensign during the 1989 revolution	The Communist flag with a hole cut out of the middle to remove the coat of arms, as a symbolic protest against the Ceaușescu regime

=== Monarchical flags ===
Flag	Date	Use	Description
	14 April 1867 – 22 March 1872	Royal standard of the Domnitor	Ratio: 2:3
	23 March 1872 – 20 July 1898	Royal standard of the Domnitor	Ratio: 2:3
	21 July 1898 – 23 April 1922	Royal standard of the King	Ratio: 1:1; Ratio between colors: 1:4:1
	24 April 1922 – 30 December 1947	Royal standard of the King	Ratio: 1:1
	24 April 1922 – 30 December 1947	Royal standard of the Queen	Ratio: 1:1
	19 February 1941 – 30 December 1947	Royal standard of the Queen Mother	Ratio: 1:1
	21 July 1898 – 23 April 1922	Royal standard of the Crown Prince	Ratio: 1:1; Ratio between colors: 1:4:1
	24 April 1922 – 30 December 1947	Royal standard of the Crown Prince	Ratio: 1:1
	2007–2017	Royal standard of the Crown Princess (Margareta of Romania)	Ratio: 1:1
	1927–1930	Royal standard of the members of the Regency	Ratio: 1:1
	24 April 1922 – 30 December 1947	Royal standard of a Member of the Royal House	Ratio: 1:1

=== Military flags of the Kingdom of Romania ===
Flag	Date	Use	Description
	1872–1921	Army flag of the Principality of Romania/Princely standard, official model. Several other models were used instead (see above). Used as military ensign. Not used as war or state flag.	Blue-yellow-red vertical tricolor with the country's coat of arms in the middle.
	1882–1897	Army flag of the Kingdom of Romania	Blue-yellow-red vertical tricolor with the country's coat of arms in the middle (slightly modified de facto). In corners, the monogram of king Carol I of Romania, crowned and surrounded by a laurel wreath. Ratio: 1:1.
	1897–1902	Army flag of the Kingdom of Romania	Blue-yellow-red vertical tricolor with the country's coat of arms in the middle (slightly modified de facto). In corners, the monogram of king Carol I of Romania, crowned and surrounded by a laurel wreath.
	1902–1914	Army flag of the Kingdom of Romania	Blue-yellow-red vertical tricolor with the country's coat of arms in the middle (slightly modified de facto), surrounded by a laurel wreath. In corners, the monogram of king Carol I of Romania, crowned and surrounded by a laurel wreath.
	1914–1921	Army flag of the Kingdom of Romania	Blue-yellow-red vertical tricolor with the country's coat of arms in the middle (slightly modified de facto), surrounded by a laurel wreath. In corners, the monogram of king Ferdinand I of Romania, crowned and surrounded by a laurel wreath.
	1921–1927 (1930?)	Army flag of the Kingdom of Romania. First awarded in 1926	Blue-yellow-red vertical tricolor with the country's coat of arms in the middle, surrounded by a laurel wreath. In corners, the monogram of king Ferdinand I of Romania, crowned and surrounded by a laurel wreath.
	1930–1940	Army flag of the Kingdom of Romania	Blue-yellow-red vertical tricolor with the country's coat of arms in the middle, surrounded by a laurel wreath. In corners, the monogram of king Carol II of Romania, crowned and surrounded by a laurel wreath.
	1940–1947 (and 1927–1930?)	Army flag of the Kingdom of Romania	Blue-yellow-red vertical tricolor with the country's coat of arms in the middle, surrounded by a laurel wreath. In corners, the monogram of king Michael I of Romania, crowned and surrounded by a laurel wreath.
	1922–1947	Naval ensign. Not used as war or state flag.	Blue-yellow-red vertical tricolor with the country's middle coat of arms in the center.
	1922–1947	Naval jack	Yellow field with red border and the country's middle coat of arms in the center.

=== Military flags of the Socialist Republic of Romania ===
Flag	Date	Use	Description
	1952–1965	Battle flag of Romania (obverse and reverse)	
	1952–1965	Air Force flag of Romania (obverse and reverse)	

== Subdivision flags ==
Flag	Date	Use	Description
	1990–present	Bucharest (capital city)	
	1990–present	Arad (municipality)	A bright yellow flag with a blue horizontal wavy strip, symbolizing the Mureș river and the city coat of arms centered.
	1990–present	Alba Iulia (municipality)	
	1992–present	Brașov (municipality)	
	1990–present	Carei (municipality)	
	1997–present	Constanța (municipality)	
	1992–present	Oradea (municipality)	
	1998–present	Târgu Mureș (municipality)	
		Sibiu (municipality)	
		Câmpulung (municipality)	
		Bacău (municipality)	

== Political flags ==
Flag	Date	Party	Description
Current
	2014–present	National Liberal Party	
	2014–present	Social Democratic Party	
	2023–present	Alliance for the Union of Romanians	
	2023–present	The New Right	
	2004–present	Democratic Union of Hungarians in Romania	
Former
	2015–2022	United Romania Party	
	1993–2015	Everything For the Country Party	
	1965–1989	Romanian Communist Party	
	1938–1940	National Renaissance Front	
	1944–1953	Ploughmen's Front	
	1932–1934	National Socialist Party	
	1927–1941	Iron Guard	
	1930–1947	National Peasants' Party	
	1922–1946	Democratic Nationalist Party	
	1925–1935	National-Christian Defense League	
	1935–1938	National Christian Party	
	1935–1938	Swastika of Fire	
