= List of flags with reverses that differ from the obverse =

This article contains a list of flags for which the reverse (back) is different from the obverse (front). It includes current as well as historic flags of both nations and national subdivisions such as provinces, states, territories, cities and other administrations (including a few that are not recognized by the United Nations or whose sovereignty is in dispute). When the flag is that of a nation, the Subdivision column is blank ( — ).

The list below does not include flags for which the reverse side is congruent (identical) nor is it a mirror image of the obverse side (horizontally flipped). Flag sides are usually mirror copy to satisfy manufacturing constraints. Identical flags are much less common and contain an element for which a simple mirror image would be problematic, such as text (e.g. The flag of Saudi Arabia includes the Shahada, an Islamic creed; The flag of Iraq includes the Takbir) or a geographic feature (e.g. The flag of the United Nations includes an azimuthal equidistant projection of the earth). Flags having a truly different designs on both their sides (two-sided) differ from the norm. The only UN-recognized nation whose present-day flag officially contains a unique image on each side is Paraguay.

Not all impression of two-sided flags are de facto two-sided because of practical manufacturing constraints or, judging from how often it was disregarded in practice, some formal concern of heraldic nature. As such it may very well be prescribed legally from the very beginning and ever ignored in practice by institutions of every type.

Many of those flags are reconstructions based on various degree of evidence.

== Flags by nation ==
List of two-sided flags
Nation	Subdivision	Dates	Obverse	Reverse	Notes
Argentina	San Juan	2018–present			Flag of San Juan Province, Argentina
Argentina	San Juan	1997–2018			Flag of San Juan Province, Argentina
Austria-Hungary	Common Army	1867–1918			Austro-Hungarian Army
Austria-Hungary	Imperial-Royal Landwehr	1867–1918			Austro-Hungarian Army
Austria-Hungary	Royal Croatian Home Guard	1867–1918			Austro-Hungarian Army
Austria-Hungary	Royal Hungarian Honvéd	1867–1918			Austro-Hungarian Army
Azerbaijan	Internal Troops	2002–present			Flag of Azerbaijan
Bangladesh	—	1971–1972			Flag of Bangladesh
Belarus	Presidential Security Service	1995–present			List of Belarusian flags
Brazil	Paraíba	1965–present			Flag of Paraíba
Brazil	Piauí	1922–present			Flag of Piauí
Brazil	São Paulo	1922–present			Flag of São Paulo
British Empire	Province of New York	1775–1777			George Rex Flag
Bulgaria	Stara Zagora	1996–present			Flag of Stara Zagora
Comoros	—	1996–2001			Flag of the Comoros
East Timor	National Council of Maubere Resistance	1998–2002			Flag of East Timor
El Salvador	—	1877–Nov 2 1898 and Nov 30 1898–1912			Flag of El Salvador
Ethiopian Empire	Imperial Standard	1962–1975			Haile Selassie
Republic of Formosa	—	1895			Flag of the Republic of Formosa
Hungarian People's Republic	Scout Association	1970			Flag of Hungary
Hungary	Csernely	1991–present			Flag of Csernely
Hungary	Dömsöd	?–present			Flag of Dömsöd
Hungary	Dorog	1919–present			Flag of Dorog
Hungary	Kecel	?–present			Flag of Kecel
Iceland	President of Iceland	1944–present			Flag of Iceland
Indonesia	Indonesian National Armed Forces	?–present			Flag of Indonesia
Indonesia	Indonesian Army	?–present			Flag of Indonesia
Indonesia	Indonesian Navy	?–present			Flag of Indonesia
Indonesia	Indonesian Air Force	?–present			Flag of Indonesia
Indonesia	Indonesian National Police	?–present			Flag of Indonesia
Latvia	Prime Minister of Latvia	1995–present			Flag of Latvia
Latvia	Speaker of the Saeima	1995–present			Flag of Latvia
Lithuania	State flag	1918–1940			President used a variant with aspect ratio of 1:1.
Lithuania	Lithuanian Armed Forces	?–2024			List of flags of Lithuania
Lithuania	Lithuanian Armed Forces	2024–present			List of flags of Lithuania
Luxembourg	Army of Luxembourg	1982–present			Flag of Luxembourg On military flag and emblems (I). The Grand Ducal Order. 15 February 1982.
Madagascar	President of Madagascar	1959–1972			Flag of Madagascar
Madagascar	President of Madagascar	1972–1975			Flag of Madagascar
Madagascar	President of Madagascar	1976–1993			Flag of Madagascar
Madagascar	President of Madagascar	1993–1996			Flag of Madagascar
Madagascar	President of Madagascar	1998–2002			Flag of Madagascar
Moldavian Democratic Republic	— and Sfatul Țării	1999–present			Flag of Moldova
Moldavia	Infantry Battalion	1346–1859			Flag and coat of arms of Moldavia We have very little information on ancient Moldavian and Wallachian flags. For Moldavia the most important symbol has always been the wild ox head, which is still to be found on the flag of the new Moldavian republic. In early times the red prevailed on other colours: on standards, the wild ox head appeared on the recto, while the verso represented St. George killing the dragon. It seems that this standard was adopted by Bogdan I and maintained by Stephan the Great and successors. In the following century (XIX) the blue was added. According to an 1813 document, under prince Scarlat Calimachi the princely standard was red, yellow and blue on the recto (without any symbol), while on the verso was St George riding a horse on a blue field. Another document, dated 1814, again reports a red standard. Michael II Sutu (1819–21) had a blue flag with the wild ox head on the recto and red with St George the verso. The two Moldavian flags above from the XV–XVI c. are in Bucharest museum.
Moldavia	Infantry Battalion	1834–1849			
Moldova	—	1990–2010			Flag of Moldova
Moldova	Information and Security Service	1999–present			Flag of Moldova
Moldova	Gagauzia	1995–present			Flag of Gagauzia
Nazi Germany	—	1935–1945			Flag of Nazi Germany
North Korea	Ministry of Defence	2023–present			List of North Korean flags
North Korea	Korean People's Army	1948			List of North Korean flags
North Korea	Korean People's Army	1948–1961	For Guards only up to 1961:	For Guards only up to 1961:	List of North Korean flags
North Korea	Korean People's Army	1961–1992			List of North Korean flags
North Korea	Korean People's Army	1992–1993			List of North Korean flags
North Korea	Korean People's Army Ground Force	2023–present			List of North Korean flags
North Korea	Korean People's Army Air Force	2023–present			List of North Korean flags
North Korea	Korean People's Navy	2023–present			List of North Korean flags
North Korea	Korean People's Army Strategic Rocket Force	2018–2020			List of North Korean flags
North Korea	Korean People's Army Special Operation Force	2018–2020			List of North Korean flags
North Korea	Worker-Peasant Red Guards	2023–present			List of North Korean flags
Paraguay	—	1842–1954			Flag of Paraguay
Paraguay	—	1954–1988			Flag of Paraguay
Paraguay	—	1988–1990			Flag of Paraguay
Paraguay	—	1990			Flag of Paraguay
Paraguay	—	1990–2013			Flag of Paraguay
Paraguay	—	2013–present			Flag of Paraguay
Philippines	—	1898–1901			Flag of the Philippines: Obverse has "Fuerzas Expeditionarias del Norte de Luzon" inscribed; Reverse has the words "Libertad Justicia e Igualdad" inscribed.
Philippines	Loboc	2021–present			Both obverse and reverse sides have a treble clef.
(Thailand) Rattanakosin Kingdom	Siamese Expeditionary Forces	1917–1919			Flag of the Rattanakosin Kingdom
Romania	Romanian Air Force	1992–present			List of Romanian flags
Romania	Romanian General Staff	1992–present			List of Romanian flags
Romania	Romanian Land Forces	1992–present			List of Romanian flags
Romania	Romanian Naval Forces	1992–present			List of Romanian flags
Romania	Battle flag	1950–1952			List of Romanian flags
Romania	Battle flag	1952–1965			List of Romanian flags
Romania	Battle flag	1966–1989			List of Romanian flags
Romania	Romanian Air Force	1950–1952			List of Romanian flags
Romania	Romanian Air Force	1952–1965			List of Romanian flags
Romania	Romanian Patriotic Guards	1977–1989			List of Romanian flags
Romania	Romanian Naval Forces	1950–1951			List of Romanian flags
Romania	Romanian Naval Forces	1952–1965			List of Romanian flags
Russia	Mari El	1992–2006			Flag of Mari El
Russia	Gorodishchensky District	2002–2012			Flag of the Gorodishchensky District
Russia	Russian Armed Forces	2003–present			List of Russian flags
Russia	Russian Ground Forces	2002–present			List of Russian flags
Russia	Russian Aerospace Forces	2002–present			List of Russian flags
Saudi Arabia	Civil ensign	1980–present			Flag of Saudi Arabia
Soviet Union	—	1923–1991			Flag of the Soviet Union
Soviet Union	Armenian SSR	1952–1990			Flag of Armenian SSR
Soviet Union	Azerbaijan SSR	1952–1991			Flag of Azerbaijan SSR
Soviet Union	Byelorussian SSR	1951–1991			Flag of Byelorussian SSR
Soviet Union	Estonian SSR	1953–1990			Flag of Estonian SSR
Soviet Union	Georgian SSR	1951–1990			Flag of Georgian SSR
Soviet Union	Karelo-Finnish SSR	1953–1956			Flag of Karelo-Finnish SSR
Soviet Union	Kazakh SSR	1953–1992			Flag of Kazakh SSR
Soviet Union	Kirghiz SSR	1952–1992			Flag of Kirghiz SSR
Soviet Union	Latvian SSR	1953–1990			Flag of Latvian SSR
Soviet Union	Lithuanian SSR	1953–1988			Flag of Lithuanian SSR
Soviet Union	Moldavian SSR	1952–1990			Flag of Moldavian SSR
Soviet Union	Russian SFSR	1954–1991			Flag of the Russian SFSR
Soviet Union	Tajik SSR	1953–1992			Flag of Tajik SSR
Soviet Union	Turkmen SSR	1953–1992			Flag of Turkmen SSR
Soviet Union	Ukrainian SSR	1949–1991			Flag of Ukrainian SSR
Soviet Union	Uzbek SSR	1952–1991			Flag of Uzbek SSR
Soviet Union	Soviet Army	1946–1992			List of Russian flags
Spain	Almendros	1988–present			List of Spanish flags
Spain	Arapiles	1993–present			List of Spanish flags
Spain	Burgueta	2001–present			List of Spanish flags
Spain	Puebla de Almenara	1988–present			List of Spanish flags
Spain	Villarrubio	1988–present			List of Spanish flags
Transnistria	—	1991–present			Flag of Transnistria
Vietnam	People's Army of Vietnam	1991–present			Flag of Vietnam
Vietnam	Vietnam People's Public Security	1991–present			Flag of Vietnam
United States	Alabama	1861–1865			Flag of Alabama
United States	Massachusetts	1908–1971			Flag of Massachusetts
United States	Minnesota	1893–1957			Flag of Minnesota
United States	Oregon	1925–present			Flag of Oregon
United States	Raleigh, North Carolina	1960–present			Flag of Raleigh, North Carolina
United States	Richmond, Virginia	1914–1933			Flag of Richmond, Virginia
United States	West Virginia	1905–1907			Flag of West Virginia, Carmine red fringe
United States	West Virginia	1907–1929			Flag of West Virginia, Old gold fringe

== See also ==
- Glossary of vexillology
- Vexillology
