= Flag of Raleigh, North Carolina =

City of Raleigh
- Use: Civil flag
- Proportion: 14:23 (official); 2:3 (common usage)
- Adopted: May 31, 1889 (modified April 25, 1960)
- Design: A red-white-red vertical triband with the Seal of Raleigh in the center
- Use: Civil flag
- Proportion: 14:23 (official); 2:3 (common usage)
- Design: A red-white-red vertical triband with a modified version of Walter Raleigh's coat of arms in the center

The flag of Raleigh is the official municipal flag of Raleigh, North Carolina. It is one of the few American city flags to currently feature different designs on the obverse and reverse. Both sides feature a similar red-white-red vertical triband with an emblem in the center. The obverse features the Seal of Raleigh. The reverse has a modified version of the coat of arms of Sir Walter Raleigh.

The initial design of the flag was created in October 1899, though the idea was first proposed in April of that year. It was supposed to be given to the USS Raleigh (C-8); however, the ship was decommissioned before it could receive it. While the ship was commissioned again in the future, it is not known if the flag made it on board. One of the original flags was found in city storage in 1960. After modifications to the design were made, it was readopted as the city flag of Raleigh on April 25 of that year and has remained since.

== Design and symbolism ==
Raleigh's flag is perhaps the only American city flag to have different designs on the front and back. Richmond, Virginia had a two-sided design before the city changed the design in 1993 to its current status.

=== Obverse side ===
The Seal of Raleigh, featured in the center of the obverse side

The red-white-red triband is a reference to the namesake of the city, Walter Raleigh, as red and white were the colors of his arms. The seal depicts a green silhouette of an oak tree, a reference to Raleigh's "City of Oaks" nickname, which it received for the abundance of oak trees throughout the city. Underneath the tree is text reading "ESTABLISHED 1792", the year land in Wake County was purchased for a planned capital. 1792 was also the year the North Carolina General Assembly named the city "Raleigh". Surrounding the tree is a gold ring bordered in green. Within the ring are two pieces of text: "CITY OF RALEIGH" is on top and "NORTH CAROLINA" is on bottom. These phrases are separated by dots on both sides. A green open wreath of oak leaves with gold acorns surrounds this emblem, further referencing the "City of Oaks" nickname. A tied gold ribbon is at the base of the wreath.

=== Reverse side ===
Coat of arms of Walter Raleigh, featured in the center of the reverse side

The back side features the same red-white-red triband. The emblem, however, changes from the Seal of Raleigh to Walter Raleigh's coat of arms, with a few additions. In heraldry terms, Sir Walter's arms would be described as gules, five lozenges in bend, argent. Atop this shield is a black deer upon six connected ellipses alternating between the red and silver used in the shield. The deer is a reference to the name "Raleigh", as the Old English meaning of Raleigh is "meadow of the deer". Below the shield is a red ribbon that reads "Amore et Virtute" (English: "By Love and Valor"), Sir Walter's motto.

== History ==
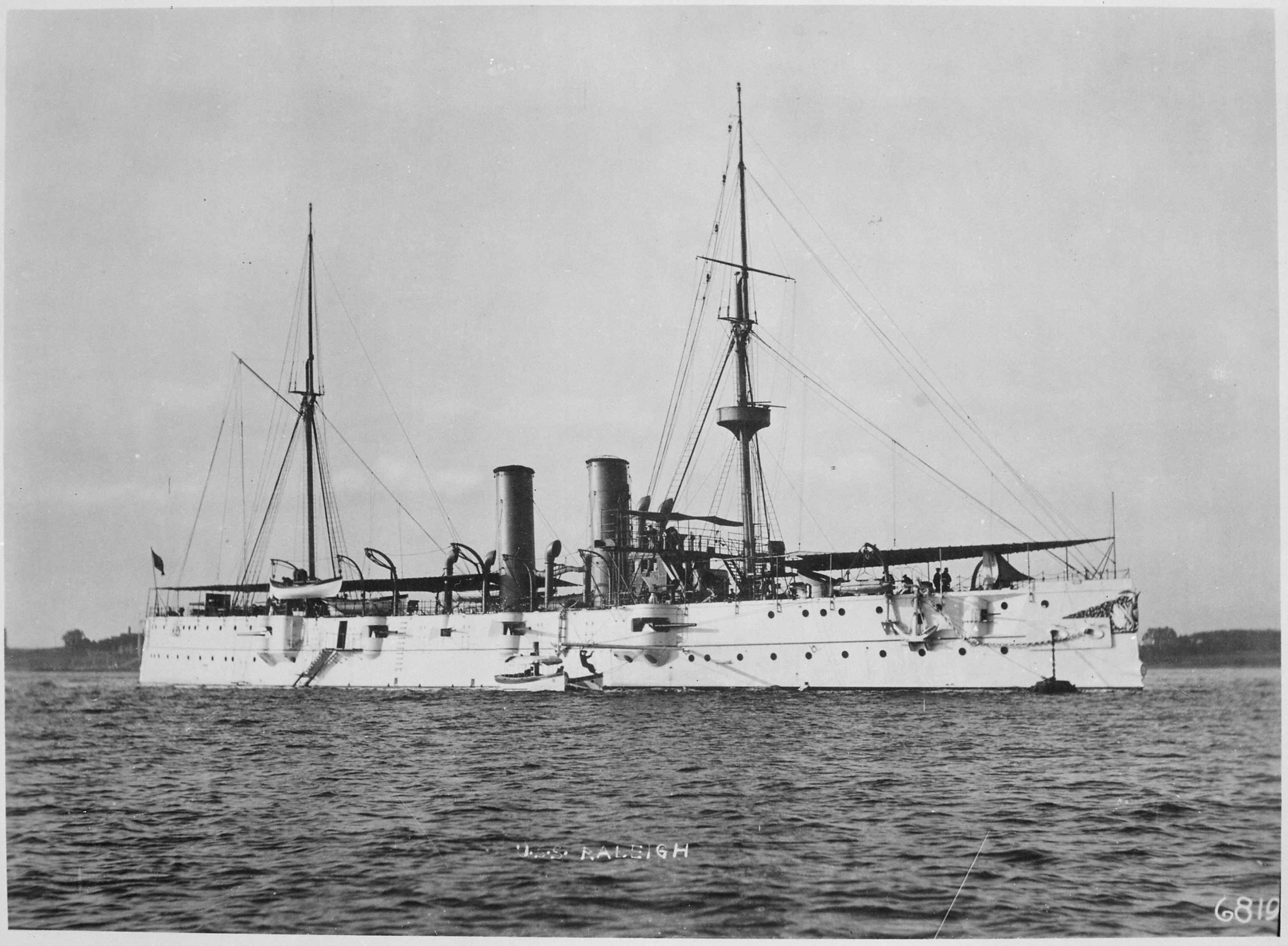
USS Raleigh (C-8), the ship whose performance in the Spanish–American War prompted the idea for a city flag

The idea to create a city flag was first conceived in April 1899. It was decided by the Raleigh Board of Aldermen that a city flag be gifted to the USS Raleigh (C-8), a ship constructed in the Norfolk Naval Shipyard in Portsmouth, Virginia and named after the city. She played an important role during the Spanish–American War. A flag committee was assembled by the board and it soon discussed color choice. During the city's centennial celebration in 1892, red and yellow were the colors most commonly used. The committee decided against using this pair as they were deemed "too Spanish" during a time of war against Spain. Instead, red and white were chosen. Red and white were the colors used for Walter Raleigh's arms and were described as "colors emblematic of Raleigh". In addition, the committee decided that a triband using these colors should be on the flag and also recommended that one side of the flag have an oak tree surrounded by a gold ring with the text "City of Raleigh 1792" and have oak leaves and acorns surrounding the ring.

With these instructions, the committee gave Kate Denson $52 to sew the flag. Denson was not done sewing the flag when the ship made a stop in Wilmington, North Carolina on May 5, 1899. A city spokesman said "a handsome flag of the city colors" would be delivered to the ship at a later date. However, the ship was decommissioned a little over a month later on June 10, in Portsmouth, New Hampshire. Denson finished the flag in October of that year, and it soon flew at the North Carolina State Fair. The flag had dimensions of 43" by 69" and featured gold-colored bullion fringes around it. The flag featured different designs on both sides. On one, a red-white-red vertical triband featuring the recommended oak tree in a gold ring with the leaves and acorns, differing from the committee's suggestion by using the text "City of Raleigh, North Carolina" (not just City of Raleigh) in the top half and "1792" in the bottom half. On the other, the same color triband and Walter Raleigh's coat of arms, along with the text "Presented to the U.S. Cruiser Raleigh, the 'First and Last at Manila'." This was in reference to the ship's claim to firing the first shot at the Battle of Manila Bay and for staying in Manila until the Spanish surrendered. The flag was officially presented to the Board of Aldermen on December 1, 1899. The board was pleased with the finished work and commissioned her to make a second flag.

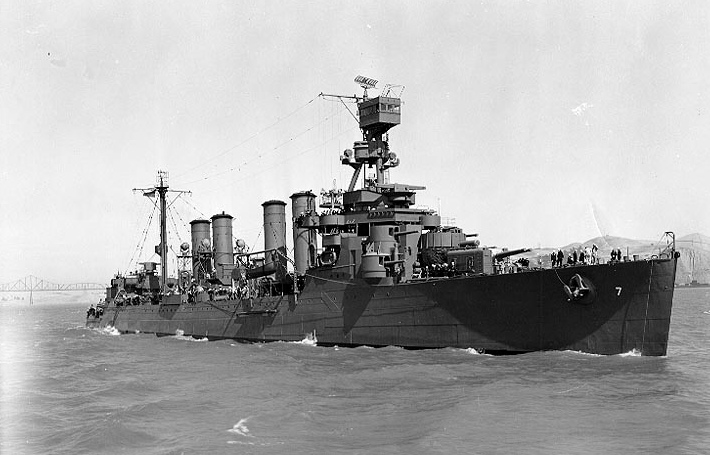
The USS Raleigh (CL-7), which actually had possession of the flag for some time

The USS Raleigh was put back into commission in 1903 until 1907 and was commissioned again in 1911 until 1919. It is unknown if the city flag ever made it on to the ship. What is known is that the next USS Raleigh, the USS Raleigh (CL-7), did have possession of one of the two flags in 1938. The flag was lent to the ship to be copied. Upon returning the flag to the city government, it was reported to be "nearly worn out". This left the city with only one flag. After 1938, no mention or public record was published and the remaining flag was presumably put in storage. The flag was rediscovered in 1960 by the city manager. It was discussed that this flag should be the official flag for Raleigh and later that year, on April 25, the flag was adopted as the official city flag by the city council. The flag adopted in 1960 had a few differences from the 1899 design. It saw the removal of the date within the gold ring and instead put "ESTABLISHED 1792" at the base of the tree within the ring. The reverse saw the simplification of the coat of arms as well as the removal of the Manila Bay reference, although the reference may have been removed with Denson's second flag. An eleven-year restoring process began to recover the flag that was found in storage. The flag spent part or all of this process in New York, where it is likely many people experimented with many different adhesive restoration techniques on the flag. After the flag was restored, it was put on display at the City Hall in 1980. For the flag's 100th birthday in 1999, the flag was given to the City of Raleigh Museum, where it remains today as part of an exhibit on Raleigh's city flag.

The flag ranked 56th out of 150 American city flags in a 2004 North American Vexillological Association survey. This made it the highest-ranked North Carolina city on the list, beating out Charlotte's flag, which placed 66th, and Greensboro's flag, which placed 98th. The flag also received local news coverage when the city council considered redesigning it in 2015. Cultural diplomacy between Raleigh and its sister city Gibraltar have involved flag exchanges involving the flags of the two entities.

=== Proposed new flag ===
Flag designed and promoted by the "New Raleigh Flag" group

Since 2021, a group named "New Raleigh Flag" has been advocating for the adoption of a new city flag, using a specific proposal designed by group members. Despite its current lack of official status, the flag has already gained popularity across the city. It consists of a red field (the primary colour of the present flag) defaced in the centre with a stylized red and silver acorn (evoking the nickname "City of Oaks") decorated with a diagonal pattern of silver lozenges (taken from the arms of Walter Raleigh). In October 2024, the group formally presented the design to the city council, asking them to consider it for official adoption.
