= Death penalty law =

A death penalty law is any law dealing with capital punishment.

== Laws ==
- 1978 California Proposition 7, U.S. state law which increased the use of the death penalty in regards to first and second-degree murder.
- Anti-Homosexuality Act, 2023, Ugandan law proscribing the death penalty for "aggravated homosexuality".
- Death Penalty for Terrorists Law, Israeli law proscribing the death penalty for those convicted of terrorism.
- Rocco Code, an Italian list of crimes punishable by death, in use between 1930 and 1943.
- Treason by Women Act (Ireland) 1796

== See also ==
- Capital punishment by country
