= Emblem of the Lithuanian Soviet Socialist Republic =

- Armiger: Lithuanian Soviet Socialist Republic
- Adopted: 1940
- Crest: Red star
- Supporters: Wheat and Oak
- Motto: „Visų šalių proletarai, vienykitės!“ (Lithuanian) «Пролетарии всех стран, соединяйтесь!» (Russian) ("Workers of the world, unite!")

The Emblem of the Lithuanian Soviet Socialist Republic was adopted in 1940 by the government of the Lithuanian Soviet Socialist Republic. The emblem was designed by Vsevolodas Dobužinskis based on the State Emblem of the Soviet Union. The new coat of arms replaced the traditional coat of arms of Lithuania, known as Vytis, which was restored when Lithuania declared its independence in 1990.

The emblem is an example of so-called "socialist heraldry". It featured symbols of agriculture (oak branches and wheat). The rising sun stood for the future of the Lithuanian nation, the red star as well as the hammer and sickle for the victory of communism and the "world-wide socialist community of states". The banner bore the USSR State motto (Proletarians of all countries, unite!) in both Russian and Lithuanian (Visų šalių proletarai, vienykitės!). The initialism of the Lithuanian SSR is shown only in the Lithuanian language – LTSR, for Lietuvos Tarybų Socialistinė Respublika, or Lithuanian Soviet Socialist Republic. The coat of arms differed little from those of Estonian, Latvian, Moldavian or other soviet socialist republics.

In November 1988, the Supreme Soviet of the Lithuanian SSR replaced the Soviet flag with the tricolor flag of Lithuania and the Soviet anthem with Tautiška giesmė. Lithuania was the first Soviet republic to restore its national symbols. However, the coat of arms were not restored. The traditional coat of arms of Lithuania was recognized as a national symbol, but not elevated to the status of state's coat of arms. That was done only in March 1990, the same day Lithuania declared independence.

== See also ==
- Flag of the Lithuanian Soviet Socialist Republic
- Coat of arms of Lithuania
