= Vsevolodas Dobužinskis =

Lithuanian painter

Vsevolodas Dobužinskis (Russian: Всеволод Мстиславович Добужинский, Vsevolod Mstislavovich Dobuzhinskiy; 31 January 1906, Saint Petersburg – 26 August 1998, New York) was a Lithuanian painter. He was son of Mstislav Dobuzhinsky. He designed several Lithuanian stamps during interbellum period, as well as the coat of arms of the Lithuanian SSR.

== See also ==
- List of Lithuanian painters
