= List of flags of Lithuania =

The following is a list of flags of Lithuania.

== National flag and state flag ==
Flag	Date	Use	Description
	2004–present	National flag and civil ensign	A horizontal tricolor of yellow, green, and red. Current version adopted in 2004. Ratio: 3:5
	2004–present	State flag (historical)	The flag displays the national emblem in a banner form. Adopted in 2004. Ratio: 3:5

== Government flags ==
Flag	Date	Use	Description
	1993–present	Presidential standard	The state emblem charged in the center on a dark red field. Ratio: 5:6
	?–present	Defence Minister	White flag with the national flag in canton and a circular badge showing the stylized Columns of Gediminas on a red field in the center of the fly half. Ratio: 1:2
	1998–present	Police flag	White flag with a blue bend crossing the flag from the upper hoist to the lower fly, the police badge in the middle, and silver laurels near all the sides. Ratio: 1:1
	2005–present	Customs flag	Golden flag with the logo of Customs Department in the middle, surrounding by silver laurels and caduceus. Ratio: 1:1
	1994–present	Border Guard flag	White flag with a green bend crossing the flag from the upper hoist to the lower fly, the insignia of the State Border Guard Service in the middle, and golden laurels near all the sides. Ratio: 1:1
	?–present	Flag of the Dignitary Protection Service	Dark red with the emblem of the Dignitary Protection Service in the middle. Ratio: 3:5

== Military flags ==
Flag	Date	Use	Description
	2026–present	Flag of the Lithuanian Armed Forces	Red flag with the Columns of Gediminas. Ratio: 3:5
	?–2024	Battle flag of the Lithuanian Armed Forces	Dark red flag with a central red disc surrounded by a gold laurel wreath, upon which is Vytis (obverse) or the Columns of Gediminas (reverse). Ratio: 5:6
	2024–present	Battle flag of the Lithuanian Armed Forces	Dark red flag with Vytis (obverse) or Columns of Gediminas (reverse) in the center, and surrounding by the golden frame filling with oak-leaf garland parallel.
	2026–present	Land Force flag	Green flag with emblem of the Lithuanian Land Forces in the middle. Ratio: 3:5
	2005–2026	Land Force flag	Red flag with the Columns of Gediminas. Ratio: 3:5
	2004–present	Flag of Land Forces Command	Dark red flag with Vytis (obverse) or a mace (reverse) in center, an oak-leaf garland parallel to all the sides on the inside, and the Columns of Gediminas in each corner. Ratio: 5:6
	1992–present	Air Force flag	White flag charged with the national flag in the canton and with stylized azure wings and double cross of Jogaila family in the lower fly quarter. The cross of Jogaila family is white bordered with two black bends. Ratio: 1:2
	1927–1940	Naval ensign	Lithuanian tricolor with a red shield containing a Jagiellonian double cross. Ratio: 1:2
	1992–present	Naval ensign	White with a dark blue St. George-style cross throughout and the Lithuanian tricolor in the canton. Ratio: 3:5
	1927–1940	Naval jack	Green-bordered red field with yellow double cross of Jogaila family in the canton.
	1992–2004	Naval jack	White with a circular badge showing the Columns of Gediminas on a red field, with a dark blue anchor behind the badge. Ratio: 1:2
	2004–present	Naval jack	Identical to a historical state flag of Lithuania. Ratio: 3:5
	2020–present	Special Operations Force flag	Green flag with the Jagiellonian double cross.
	1992–present	The flag of Commander-in-Chief of the Armed Forces	White flag with the national tricolour in the canton and three red stars set in a raising diagonal in the fly half. The stars are six-pointed, segmented with black lines, and with white border fimbriated with red.
	1992–present	Chief of Staff's flag	Flag similar to CinC Armed Forces, but with two stars only.
	1992–present	Commander Naval Armed Forces	Flag similar to CinC Armed Forces, but with a single star only.
	?–present	Brigade Commander's flag	Pennant consisting of the national flag at hoist and tapering swallow-tailed white part at fly, containing two red stars (of the same shape as in the previous flags) next to each other. Ratio: 1:5
	?–present	Division Commander	Same as Brigade Commander's flag, but with single star. Ratio: 1:5
	?–present	Group Commander	Same as Brigade Commander's flag, but without the stars. Ratio: 1:5
	?–present	Masthead pennant	Rectangular pennant with swallow-tail, national tricolour at hoist (1:4) and blue fly. Total flag ratio: 1:20
	1991–present	Flag of the Lithuanian National Defence Volunteer Force	Green flag with the emblem of the Lithuanian National Defence Volunteer Force in the center.
	1992–present	Flag of the Mechanized Infantry Brigade: "Iron Wolf"	
	1991–present	Flag of the Lithuanian Military Logistics Command	
	1991–present	Flag of the Military Medical Service	

== Historical flags ==
Flag	Date	Use	Description
	15th century	Royal banner of the Grand Duchy of Lithuania (modern reconstruction)	
	15th century	Royal banner used by the Gediminid Dynasty during the Battle of Grunwald (modern reconstruction)	
	16th century	Supposed appearance of the royal (military) banner of the Grand Duchy of Lithuania	
	17th century	Royal banner of Poland–Lithuania	
	1917	Flag used during the Vilnius Conference	
	1918	Flag of the Kingdom of Lithuania (German client state; modern reconstruction)	
	1918–1940	State flag and civil ensign of Republic of Lithuania	Ratio: 2:3
	1920–1922	Flag of The Republic of Central Lithuania (Polish puppet state)	A red flag with White Eagle and Vytis (Pogonia) in the middle.
	1918–1923	Flag of the Republic of Perloja	
	1988–2004	National flag and civil ensign	Ratio: 1:2

=== Soviet occupation ===
Flag	Date	Use	Description
	1918–1919	Soviet puppet state from 1918 to 1919 (Lithuanian Soviet Socialist Republic and Socialist Soviet Republic of Lithuania and Belorussia)	A plain red flag
	1940–1941	Soviet occupation from 3 July 1940 until 22 June 1941 (Lithuanian Soviet Socialist Republic)	A red flag with LIETUVOS TSR and the hammer and sickle in the canton.
	1940–1941, 1944–1955	Flag of the Soviet Union	A plain red flag with a golden hammer and sickle and a gold-bordered red star in the canton. Modified in 1955.
	1944–1953	Soviet occupation from 1944 (Lithuanian Soviet Socialist Republic)	
	1953–1988	Flag of the Lithuanian Soviet Socialist Republic (obverse and reverse)	A flag based on the Soviet flag, with an additional thin white stripe and thick green stripe in the lower third. It lacked the hammer and sickle on its reverse side, like the other flags of the constituent republics of the Soviet Union.

== Cultural regions ==
Flag	Date	Use	Description
	2006–present	Aukštaitija	
	1994–present	Žemaitija	
	2003–present	Dzūkija	
	2021–present	Suvalkija	
	2024–present	Mažoji Lietuva	

== Administrative divisions ==
=== County flags ===
Each county of Lithuania has adopted a flag, each of them conforming to a pattern: a blue rectangle, with ten instances of the Cross of Vytis appearing in gold, acts as a fringe to the central feature of the flag, which is chosen by the county itself. Most of the central designs were adapted from the counties' coat of arms.

Flag	Date	Use	Description
	2004–present	Alytus County	
	2004–present	Kaunas County	
	2004–present	Klaipėda County	
	2004–present	Marijampolė County	
	2004–present	Panevėžys County	
	2004–present	Šiauliai County	
	2004–present	Tauragė County	
	2004–present	Telšiai County	
	2004–present	Utena County	
	2004–present	Vilnius County	

=== Municipality flags ===
Flag	Date	Use	Description
	?–present	Flag of Vilnius District Municipality	
	?–present	Flag of Kaunas District Municipality	
	?–present	Flag of Klaipėda District Municipality	
	?–present	Flag of Šiauliai District Municipality	
	?–present	Flag of Alytus District Municipality	

=== Cities/towns ===
Flag	Date	Use	Description
	1991–present	Flag of Vilnius	
	1991–present	Flag of Kaunas	
	1992–present	Flag of Klaipėda	
	1991–present	Flag of Šiauliai	
	1991–present	Flag of Panevėžys	
	1991–present	Flag of Alytus	
	1991–present	Flag of Marijampolė	
	?–present	Flag of Mažeikiai	
	?–present	Flag of Jonava	
	?–present	Flag of Utena	
	1991–present	Flag of Kėdainiai	
	?–present	Flag of Telšiai	
	1991–present	Flag of Tauragė	
	1991–present	Flag of Ukmergė	
	1991–present	Flag of Palanga	
	?–present	Flag of Šilutė	
	?–present	Flag of Kretinga	
	1991–present	Flag of Elektrėnai	
	1991–present	Flag of Trakai	
	1991–present	Flag of Kernavė	

== Religious flags ==
Flag	Date	Use	Description
	?–present	Flag of the Lithuanian native faith movement Romuva	

== See also ==
- National symbols of Lithuania
- Flag of Lithuania
- List of city flags in Europe § Lithuania
- Armorial of Lithuania
