= Seal of Charlotte, North Carolina =

Official Seal of the City of Charlotte

Versions
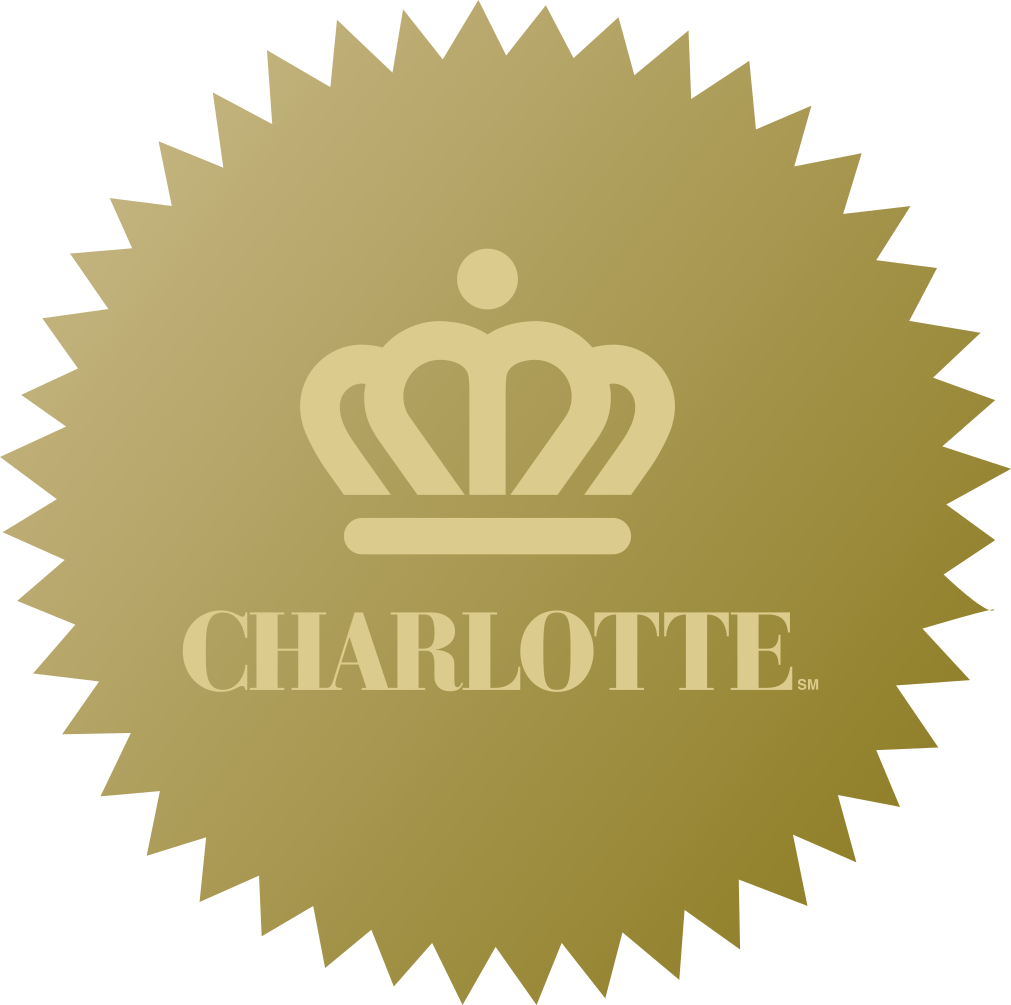
- Seal used between the rescindment of the original seal and the adoption of the current seal

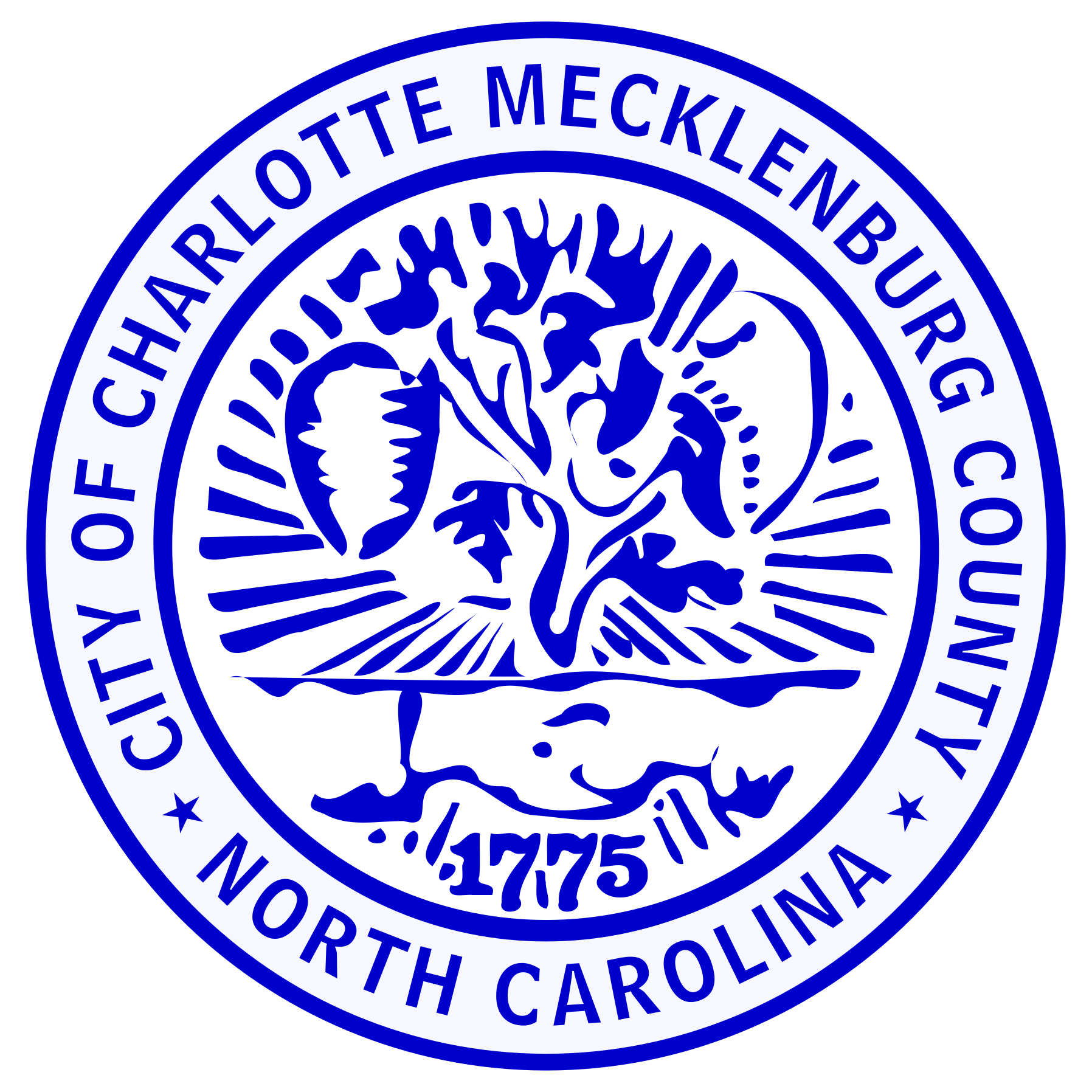
- Seal of 1911–unknown
- Armiger: Charlotte, North Carolina
- Adopted: Unknown
- Other elements: The official logo of the City of Charlotte
- Earlier version(s): 1911, 1929
- Use: On executive documents from the city

The Seal of Charlotte was first established during the tenure of mayor Charles A. Bland, and was designed over a period stretching from 1911 to 1915. It was adopted on the city's first flag in 1929, which still remains in use today. This seal itself was rescinded at an unknown date and replaced with the present one. It is used to authorize executive documents from the city, including, but not limited to, mayoral proclamations and resolutions from the Charlotte City Council.

== Description and meaning ==
=== Original seal ===
Symbolizing growth is a tree in the center, with rays radiating from behind it, symbolizing hope for the future. Hanging on the tree is a hornet's nest, a Revolutionary War-era symbol, symbolizing the role the city played during the time period. This is explained in a pamphlet produced by the city, reading:

... in the American Revolution, her citizens fought so fiercely that a British general compared being in Charlotte to being in a hornet’s nest.

More symbolism related to the era can be found within on seal, with a Liberty Cap present, hanging on the tree besides the nest. Beneath the tree are two hands clasped. The date "1775" is found below the hands, the year the Mecklenburg Declaration of Independence was supposedly adopted, a year before the Continental Congress adopted their declaration.

=== Golden seal ===
The second iteration of the seal was much simpler in design, simply featuring the city's service mark atop a golden seal. On official documents, a green ribbon is typically found below it. The crown references the city's nickname of The Queen City, which references its namesake, Queen Charlotte. It also represents unity of the city's agencies as they work in unison for the good of its residents.

Based on the adoption of the crown logo in 1985 with the current flags, it is possible the golden seal could have been adopted at that time as well, however, this is unknown, and city archives from the era do not depict any seal.

=== Current seal ===
The current seal consists of a white circle with several design elements on top of it. In the center, the city's crown logo can be found, encircled by a golden wreath. Between the two branches reads "NORTH CAROLINA", and below the crown reads "1775", the year of the Mecklenburg Declaration of Independence. These symbols are inside a golden circle, which is surrounded by text reading "CITY OF CHARLOTTE" at the top, and "REGINA CIVITATEM" in Latin, translating to "Queen City" in English, a nickname of Charlotte. There is a final golden circle surrounding the text.

== Use ==
The custodian of the seal is Charlotte's city clerk, who keeps it and all records and official documents bearing the seal. The City Clerk uses the corporate seal of Charlotte to certify that city records are authentic, exact reproductions of the originals.
