= Flag of the Lithuanian Soviet Socialist Republic =

Lithuanian Soviet Socialist Republic
- Use: Civil and state flag, civil and state ensign
- Proportion: 1:2
- Adopted: 15 July 1953
- Relinquished: 18 November 1988
- Design: A red flag with the golden hammer and sickle and a gold-bordered red star in its upper canton with the white thin stripe and green thick band on the bottom.
- Designed by: Antanas Žmuidzinavičius
- Reverse flag
- Use: Civil and state flag, civil and state ensign
- Lietuvos vėliava
- Flag of the Lithuanian SSR (1988–1990) and the Republic of Lithuania (1990–2004)
- Use: National flag and civil ensign
- Proportion: 1:2
- Adopted: 18 November 1988
- Relinquished: 8 July 2004
- Design: A horizontal tricolour of yellow, green and red.
- Designed by: Jonas Basanavičius; Tadas Daugirdas; Antanas Žmuidzinavičius

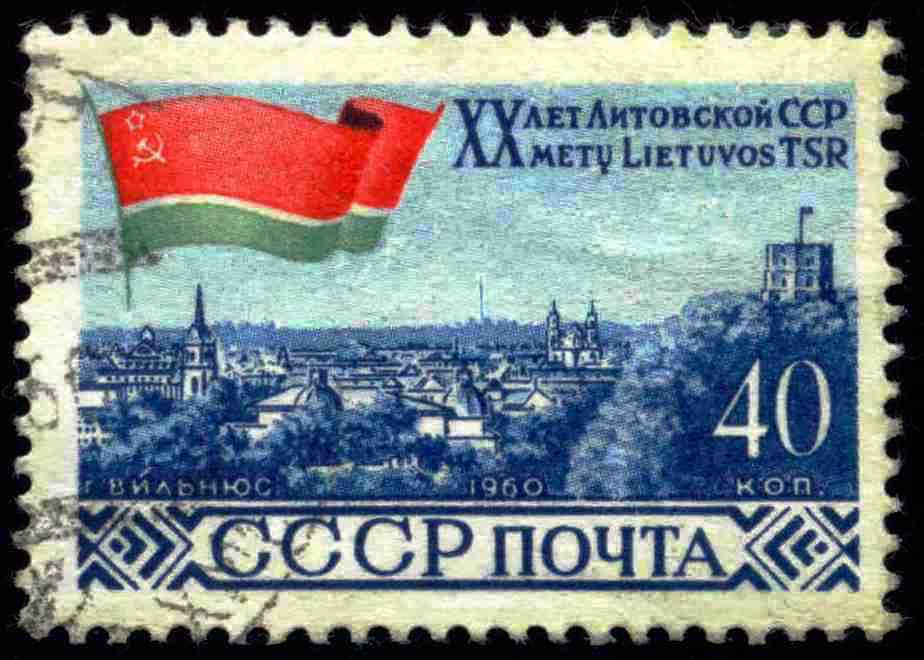
The flag on a 1960 stamp marking the 20th anniversary of the Lithuanian SSR.

The flag of the Lithuanian Soviet Socialist Republic was first adopted by the Lithuanian SSR in 1940, following the Soviet occupation of Lithuania. It was a red flag with the national name and a hammer and sickle in the upper canton. The flag in use from 1953 to 1988 was a red flag with the golden hammer and sickle and a gold-bordered red star in its upper canton with a white thin stripe and green thick band on the bottom.

== History ==
During the Lithuanian–Soviet War, the pro-Soviet forces used a plain red flag that was adopted by the short-lived Lithuanian SSR (1918–1919) and Lithuanian–Belorussia SSR puppet states.

Following the Soviet occupation, the newly established Lithuanian SSR adopted a new national flag on 30 July 1940. The flag was red with the Latin characters LIETUVOS TSR (Lithuanian SSR in the Lithuanian language) in gold sans-serif typeface in the upper canton, and a gold hammer and sickle below the text.

On 15 July 1953, a new flag was adopted. It was modified to meet the new requirements for all flags of the Soviet socialist republics. The top red portion took 2/3 of the width and incorporated the mandatory hammer and sickle and red star. The bottom part could be customized by each republic. Lithuania added a narrow white (1/12 of the width) and a larger green (1/4 of the width) strips. The green and white stripes thus represented the country's wide fields and forests, which serve the country's agricultural and forestry industries.

On 18 November 1988, the tricolour of Lithuania was adopted as the flag of the SSR, even before Lithuania declared independence in March 1990. The Supreme Soviet of the Lithuanian SSR, inspired by pro-independence Sąjūdis, amended the constitution and adopted the tricolour flag of Lithuania that was used during the interwar years.

Flag of the Lithuanian SSR and Lithuanian–Belorussia SSR (1918–1919)

Flag of the Lithuanian SSR (1940–1953)

Flag of the Lithuanian SSR (1953–1988)

Flag of the Lithuanian SSR (1988–1990/1991)

== Legal status ==
Since Lithuania banned Soviet and Nazi symbols in 2008, raising or otherwise using the Lithuanian SSR flag in public is illegal.

== See also ==
- Emblem of the Lithuanian Soviet Socialist Republic
- Flag of Lithuania
