= Flag of Lithuania =

Republic of Lithuania
- Geltona, žalia, raudona
- Use: National flag and civil ensign
- Proportion: 3:5
- Adopted: 25 April 1918 (first adoption); 18 November 1988 (restored in 1:2 ratio); 8 July 2004 (current version)
- Design: A horizontal triband of yellow, green and red
- Designed by: Jonas Basanavičius; Tadas Daugirdas; Antanas Žmuidzinavičius
- State flag of Lithuania
- Use: Naval jack and historical state flag
- Proportion: 3:5
- Adopted: 2004; first documented use in 1410
- Design: A red flag with the Vytis on the center

The national flag of Lithuania (Lithuanian: Lietuvos vėliava) consists of a horizontal tricolour of yellow, green, and red. It was adopted on 25 April 1918 during Lithuania's first period of independence (1918–1940), which ceased with the occupation first by the Soviet Union, and then by Nazi Germany (1941–1944). During the post-World War II Soviet occupation, from 1945 until 1988, the Flag of the Lithuanian SSR consisted first of a generic red Soviet flag with the name of the republic, in 1953 that was changed to the red flag with white and green bands at the bottom.

The flag was then re-adopted on 18 November 1988, about 1.5 years before the re-establishment of Lithuania's independence and almost three years before the collapse of the Soviet Union. The last alteration to the current flag occurred in 2004, when the aspect ratio changed from 1:2 to 3:5.

== History ==
Battle flag with the Vytis, 1410, reconstruction

National flag (1918–1940)

=== Historical state flag ===
The earliest known flags with a Lithuanian identity were recorded in the 15th-century Banderia Prutenorum, written by Jan Długosz. At the Battle of Grunwald in 1410, two distinct flags were present. The majority of the 40 regiments carried a red banner depicting a mounted knight in pursuit. This flag, known as the Vytis, would eventually be used as the Lithuanian war flag, and again in 2004 as the state flag. The remaining regiments carried a red banner displaying the Columns of Gediminas. Those that bore the Vytis were part of the Grand Ducal Lithuanian army, while those who bore the Columns of Gediminas were from Lithuanian nobility. Until the end of the 18th century, when it was annexed by the Russian Empire, the Grand Duchy of Lithuania used the Vytis as its flag.

=== Creation of modern flag ===
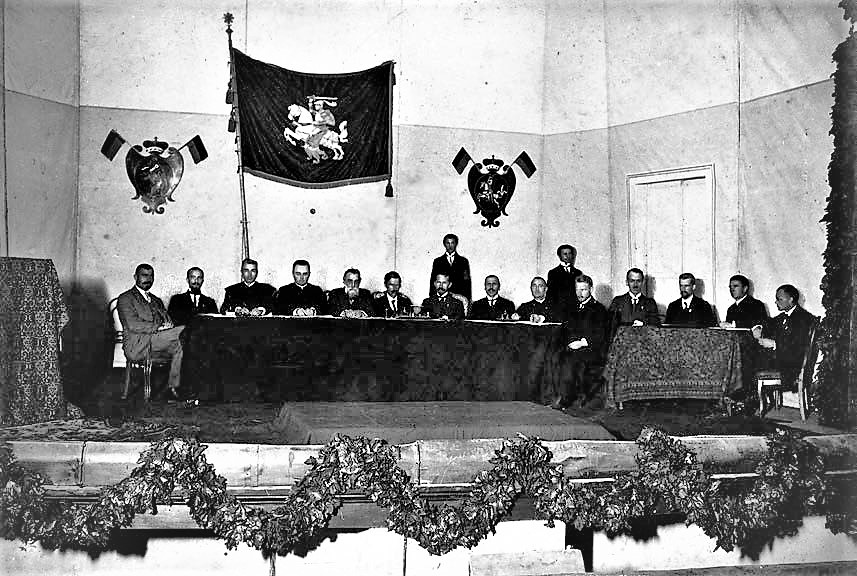
Flag used by participants of the Vilnius Conference in 1917

The birth of the yellow, green, and red tricolour occurred during a drive by other European republics to change their flags. One example that gave life to the idea of the tricolour was the French blue, white, and red flag adopted after the French Revolution. The only tricolour that existed for Lithuania before the yellow, green, and red flag was a green, white, and red flag used to represent Lithuania Minor.

It is not known who originally suggested the yellow, green, and red colours, but the idea is usually attributed to Lithuanian exiles living elsewhere in Europe or in the United States during the 19th century. These three colours were frequently used in folk weavings and traditional dress. At the Great Seimas of Vilnius of 1905, this flag was favoured over the Vytis banner as the flag of the Lithuanian nation. The Vytis, strongly advocated by Jonas Basanavičius, was not chosen for three reasons: the first was that as part of the drive for national identity, the Seimas wished to distance itself somewhat from the flag of the Grand Duchy of Lithuania, which also encompassed now-distinct nations such as Belarus and Ukraine. The second issue was the choice of the colour red by revolutionaries who aligned themselves with Marxist or Communist causes. And finally, the flag with Vytis would be too complicated and could not be easily sewn.

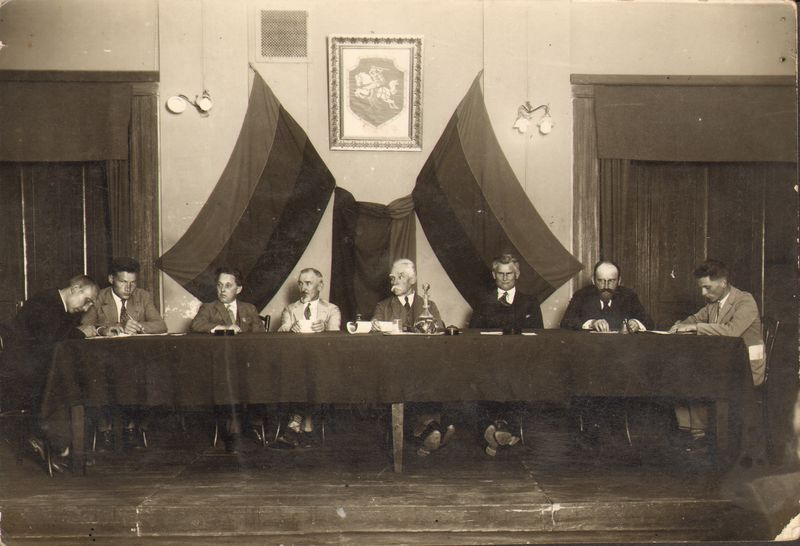
The Lithuanian triband at the Culture Congress in Kaunas, 1927.

Debates about the national flag occurred again in 1917 during the Vilnius Conference. Two colours, green and red, were chosen based on their prevalence in folk art. Artist Antanas Žmuidzinavičius decorated the conference hall with small red and green flags. However, the delegates did not like the design as it was too dark and gloomy. Then Tadas Daugirdas suggested adding a narrow strip of yellow (to symbolise the rising sun) in between the red (clouds lit up by the morning sun) and green (fields and forests). However, the delegates decided that the matter should be settled by a special commission, composed of Basanavičius, Žmuidzinavičius, and Daugirdas. On 19 April 1918, they submitted their final protocol to the Council of Lithuania. The flag was supposed to be a tricolour (yellow at the top, green in the middle, and red at the bottom) with Vytis in the upper left corner or in the middle. The Council accepted the proposal, but the 1922 Constitution of Lithuania did not include any mention of the coat of arms. It adopted the national flag that is used today. Any of the debates failed to produce a historical flag. Discussions of the national flag continued; its opponents considered gold an inappropriate colour, since the combination of yellow, green, and red did not follow the existing rules of heraldry. However, no changes were made during the Interwar period.

=== Soviet occupation ===
During World War II, Lithuania was occupied by the Soviet Union (1940–1941, 1944–1990) and Nazi Germany (1941–1944). The use of the national flag during this period was prohibited and prosecuted. Two flags were used during the period of Soviet occupation (1944–1988): immediately after the war, the flag consisted of a red field, golden hammer and sickle with the Latin characters LIETUVOS TSR (Lithuanian SSR in the Lithuanian language) above them in gold sans-serif lettering. That flag was replaced in 1953 by the last flag used by the Lithuanian Soviet Socialist Republic—a red flag, with the hammer and sickle and star in the hoist. At the bottom of the flag, a white and green horizontal bar was placed. The red portion of the flag took 2/3 of the flag's width, the white 1/12 and the green 1/4. Since Lithuania banned Soviet symbols in 2008, raising or otherwise using the Lithuanian SSR flag in public is illegal.

=== Restoration of modern flag ===
Flag of Lithuania from 1988 to 2004. The flag had a 1:2 ratio at the time.

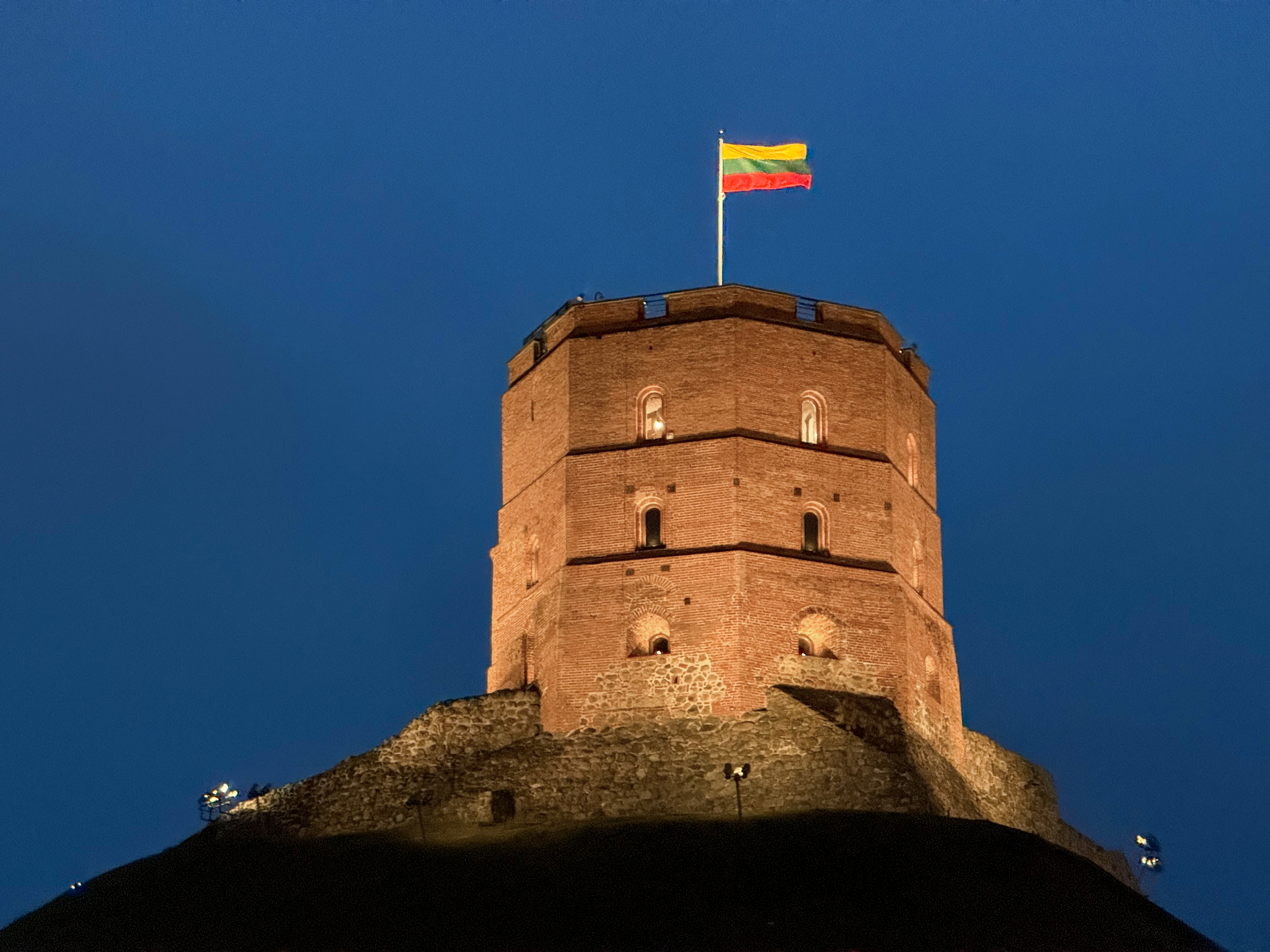
Flag of Lithuania on top of Gediminas Castle

During 1988, when the Lithuanian movement towards independence was gaining strength, the Lithuanian Supreme Soviet again recognised the tricolour as the national flag, by amending article 168 of the Constitution (Fundamental Law) of the Lithuanian SSR. The flag was defined as rectangular tricolour which consists of three equally sized horizontal stripes: the upper is yellow, the middle is green, the lower is red; the flag ratio was to be 1:2 (as that of Soviet flags). This flag was confirmed by the Provisional Constitution of 11 March 1990 No. I-10.

After independence from the Soviet Union, the tricolour flag was written into the new Constitution of Lithuania, which was adopted by a referendum in 1992. This constitution has not specified the flag aspect ratio and therefore it remained 1:2 until 2004, when 1991 law "On the national flag and other flags" was revised by 8 July 2004 law no. IX-2331, making the flag ratio 3:5.

== Design and symbolism ==
Construction sheet of the national flag

Passed on 26 June 1991, the Law of the Republic of Lithuania on the Lithuanian State Flag (Law No. I-1497) governs the design, sizes and use of the state flag. The law was amended on 8 July 2004, (Law No. IX-2331) with the most notable changes including the switching of the national flag ratio from 1:2 to 3:5 and the official adoption of a historical flag as the state (government) flag. The amendment came into force on 1 September 2004, after it was approved by President Valdas Adamkus.

The yellow in the flag is meant to symbolise the sun and prosperity, the green is for the forests, the countryside, liberty, and hope, and the red represents the blood and bravery of those who have died for Lithuania. The proper colours of both the national and state flag are made according to the Pantone Matching System, specifically Pantone textile-paper (TP). The ratio of both the national and state flag must be 3:5, with the standard flag size to be 1.0 by 1.7 metres (3.3 by 5.6 ft). Different sizes of the flag can be created, but they must conform to the colour codes and ratio requirements set in the law. The official Pantone colours have been published since 2004; the list below shows the official colours and their suggested equivalents:

Scheme	Yellow	Green	Red
Pantone	15-0955 TP / 1235 c/u	19-6026 TP / 349 c/u	19-1664 TP / 180 c/u
RGB	253, 185, 19	0, 106, 68	193, 39, 45
Web colours	#FDB913	#006A44	#C1272D
CMYK	0, 30, 100, 0	100, 55, 100, 0	25, 100, 100, 0

== State (historical) flag ==
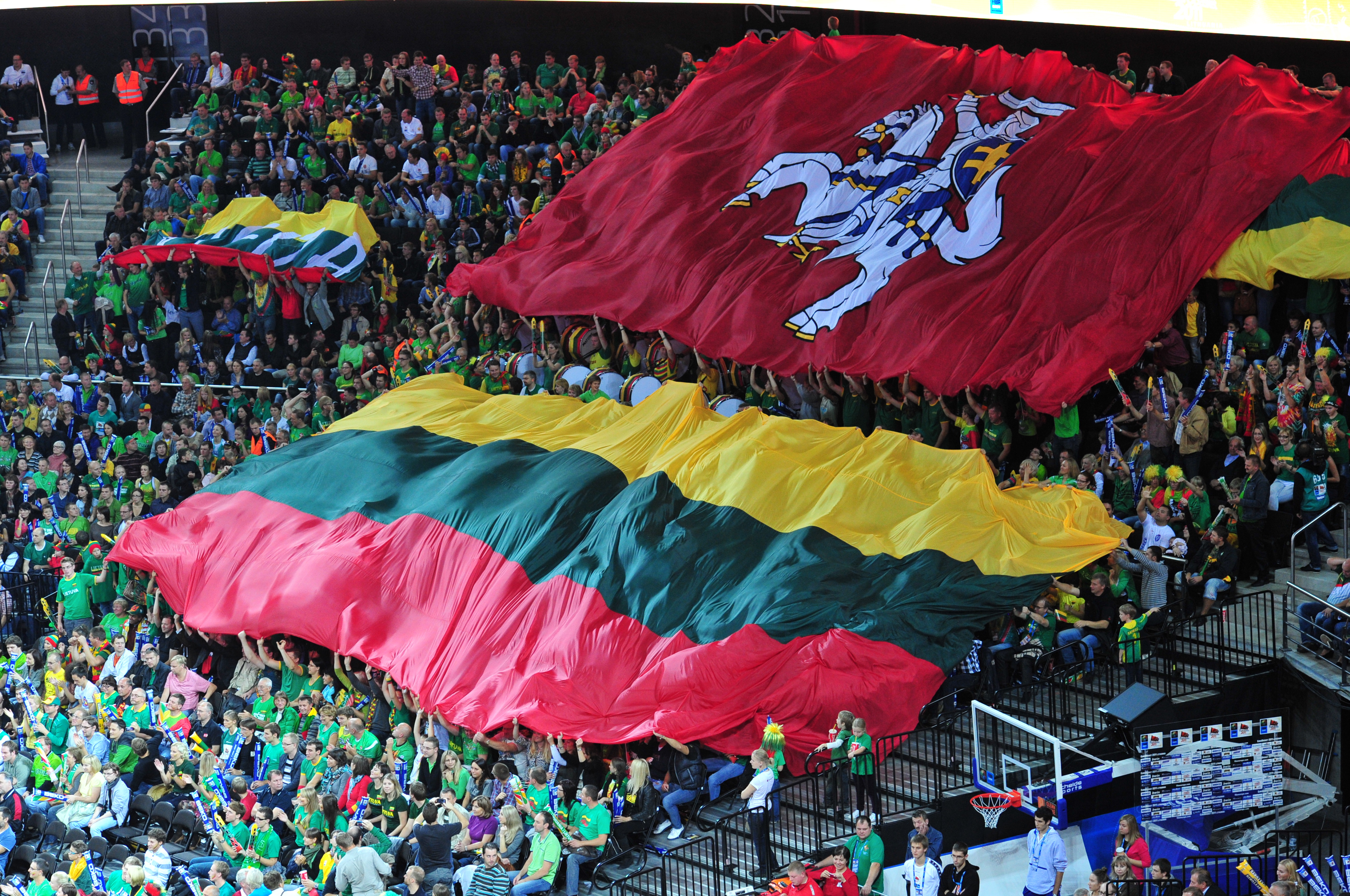
State flag (upper) and the national flag, displayed by the Lithuanian basketball fans in 2011.

In 2004, along with the law authorising the change of the flag ratio, a state flag was adopted. This flag displays the national coat of arms in banner form. The ratio of the flag is the same as that of the national flag, i.e. 3:5. The state flag, called the historical national (armorial) flag in law, was proposed by Česlovas Juršėnas, the vice-speaker of the Seimas, and by Edmundas Rimša, the chairman of the Commission of Heraldry. This flag was also proposed at the same time as the grand coat of arms; both were meant to honour the 750th anniversary of the coronation of Mindaugas in 1253 (anniversary took place in 2003). This was one of the few flags considered to become the national flag during the drive for national independence. Several other countries, including Finland, Spain, Venezuela, Germany and Thailand, have an official national flag for civilian use and a state flag for government use.

In 2008, the project intended to draft state flag was formed by the Commission of Heraldry. It concluded work in 2010. The designer of the State (historic) flag was Arvydas Každailis, who also designed the coat of arms. On 17 June 2010, this state flag proposal was adopted.

Under the National Flag Law, the state flag is permanently hoisted at three locations: the Royal Palace of Lithuania, Trakai Island Castle, and the grounds of the Vytautas the Great War Museum in Kaunas. In addition, the flag is hoisted at the following locations on these days:

- 16 February – next to the House of the Signatories, on Pilies Street in Vilnius
- 11 March – next to Seimas Palace
- 6 July – next to the Presidential Palace, Vilnius
- 15 July – next to the Ministry of Defence
- 25 October – next to the Seimas Palace, the Presidential Palace, and the Gedimino 11 building that houses the Government of Lithuania

== Flag protocol ==
A vertical display of the Lithuanian flag

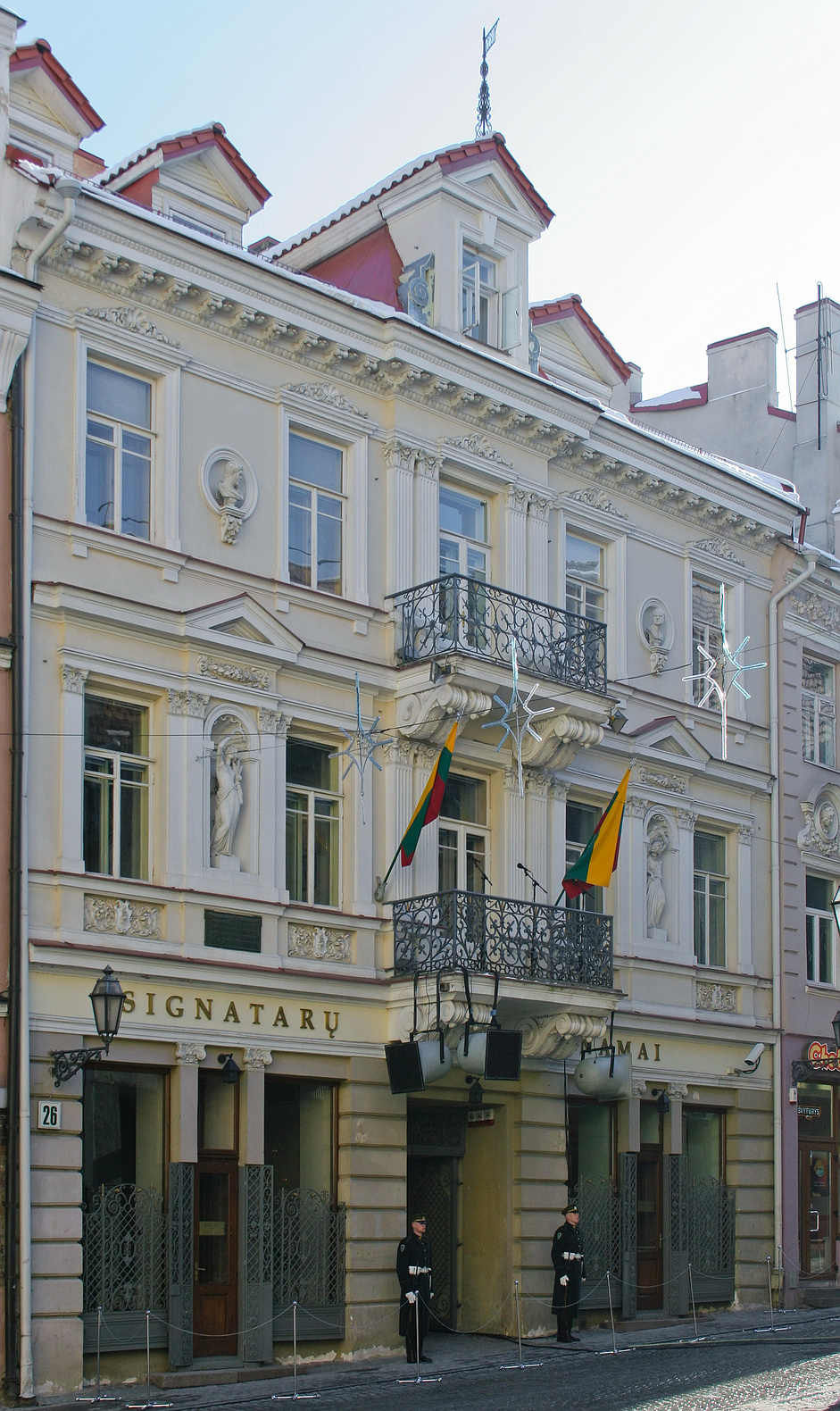
Flags hoisted on the House of the Signatories on 16 February 2007.

The flag can be flown vertically or horizontally from public buildings, private homes, businesses, ships, town squares, or during official ceremonies. If the flag is flown horizontally, the yellow stripe must be at top; when flown vertically, the yellow stripe must be facing Left with the red stripe facing Right. While the flag should be flown from sunrise to sunset, government offices in Lithuania and abroad must fly the flag on a 24-hour basis. The flags must conform to the legal standards, and cannot be soiled or damaged in any way.

For mourning activities, the flag can be flown in either of the following ways. The first method, commonly known as half-staffing, is performed when the flag is hoisted to the top of the flagpole, then lowered to the pole's one-third position. The other method is to attach a black ribbon to a flag that is permanently affixed to a staff. The ribbon itself is ten centimetres wide and it is attached to the mast so that the ends of the ribbon reach the bottom of the flag. During a funeral ceremony, the flag may be used to cover the coffins of government officials, soldiers, signatories of the Act of the Re-Establishment of the State of Lithuania, and persons designated by an act of the President; these flags are later folded and presented to the next of kin before interment.

When flying the Lithuanian flag with other flags, the following is the correct order of precedence: the national flag, the historical (state) flag, flags of foreign states, the flag of Europe, international NGOs, the presidential standard, military and government standards, county flags, city flags and any others. When foreign flags are used alongside the Lithuanian flag, the flags are sorted according to their countries' names in the Lithuanian language. The only exception is when the congress or meeting held in Lithuanian dictates a different language to be used for sorting. The flag of Europe has been hoisted since Lithuania became a member of the European Union. While not mentioned by name in the law, the flag of NATO can be used in Lithuania, since it belongs to that organization as well. It is also common to fly the flags of Estonia and Latvia during certain occasions, mainly the celebration of independence of the three Baltic states. The Law of the Republic of Lithuania on the National Flag and Other Flags governs the rules, use, protocol and manufacturing of the national and other flags used inside the country.

=== National flag days ===
As part of the flag protocol, the daily display of the Lithuanian flag is encouraged, but is strongly encouraged or legally required on the following days:

Date	English name	Remarks
1 January	Flag Day	Commemorating the day when the national flag was first raised on the Gediminas Tower in 1919
13 January	Freedom Fighters Day	In memory of the January Events in 1991
16 February	Day of Re-establishment of the State of Lithuania (from the Russian Empire, 1918)	Hoisted with the Latvian and Estonian flags
24 February	Day of Independence of Estonia	Hoisted with the Latvian and Estonian flags
11 March	Day of Restitution of Independence of Lithuania (from the Soviet Union, 1990)	Hoisted with the Latvian and Estonian flags
29 March	NATO Day	In honour of Lithuania's accession to NATO in 2004; hoisted with the Flag of NATO
1 May	European Union Day	In honour of Lithuania's accession to the European Union in 2004; hoisted with the Flag of Europe
9 May	Europe Day	Commemorates the 1950 establishment of the European Coal and Steel Community by the Schuman Declaration
15 May	Day of Convening of the Constituent Seimas	In honour of the Constituent Assembly of Lithuania
14 June	Day of Mourning and Hope	Marks the date of the first mass deportation of Lithuanians to Siberia in 1941; the flag is marked for mourning
15 June	Day of Occupation and Genocide	Marks the beginning of Soviet occupation of Lithuania in 1940; the flag is marked for mourning
6 July	Statehood Day	Commemorates coronation of the first king, Mindaugas, in 1253
15 July	Day of the Battle of Grünwald	Commemorates the victory of the Kingdom of Poland and the Grand Duchy of Lithuania over the Teutonic Knights in 1410
23 August	Day of Black Ribbon	Marks the signing of the Molotov–Ribbentrop Pact between the Soviet Union and Nazi Germany in 1939; the flag is marked for mourning
31 August	Freedom Day	Marking the final departure of the Red Army from Lithuania in 1993
23 September	Day of Genocide of Lithuanian Jews	Marking the destruction of the Vilnius ghetto by Nazi Germany in 1943
25 October	Constitution Day	Commemorating the adoption of the national constitution in 1992
18 November	Proclamation Day of the Republic of Latvia	Hoisted together with the Latvian and Estonian flags
23 November	Armed Forces Day	Commemorating the establishment of the Lithuanian Armed Forces in 1918

Apart from these days, the flag is flown at election polling sites. The national government, under Article 4, Section 7 of the flag law, is given the authority to call for the display of the national flag and to determine special conditions, such as marking for mourning.

== Other Lithuanian flags ==
Naval ensign (Ratio 3:5)

Military ensign with the Columns of Gediminas

Presidential standard (Ratio 5:6)

A naval ensign has been used by Lithuania starting on 25 May 1992. The ensign has a white background charged with a blue cross, with the national flag in the canton. The width of each cross is 1/10th of the total width of the ensign, with the ratio being 3:5. The naval jack is identical to the historical state flag of Lithuania. A masthead pennant has been adopted by the Lithuanian Navy to use on their ships.

The President of Lithuania was officially given a standard by the Seimas from 26 January 1993, with color shades standardized on 18 February. The standard is the coat of arms of Lithuania that supported by griffon and unicorn charged in the center on a single-color background. Under state law, the background color is stated as purple, but the color used in practice is dark red. The ratio of the standard is 1:1.2.

Each county of Lithuania has adopted a flag, each of them conforming to a pattern: a blue rectangle, with ten instances of the Cross of Vytis (double cross or) appearing in gold, acts as a fringe to the central feature of the flag, which is chosen by the county itself. Most of the central designs were adapted from the counties' coat of arms.

=== Later national flag proposals ===
The main proposal for the Lithuanian state flag change from 1940

Even though all members of the Council of Lithuania agreed with the flag proposal, some were unsatisfied with the adopted national flag claiming it to be very similar to national flags of Colombia and Ethiopia. Serious deliberations on changing the Lithuanian flag began in 1936. One of the greatest supporters for the flag change during the interwar period was a famous artist Mstislav Dobuzhinsky who claimed that the current flag of Lithuania did not meet the standards of heraldry. In 1938, Dobuzhinsky consulted with Lithuanian philosopher Vydūnas who provided him with information on the historical flag of Lithuania Minor. Dobuzhinsky convinced President Antanas Smetona that the flag must be changed. According to journalist and collector Vilius Kavaliauskas, "The explanation was simple: the colors of the flag had to match those of the coat of arms. No green color was present in the coat of arms. What is interesting that Smetona was convinced and, possibly on 8 May 1940, he convened a meeting with the Commission of Heraldry where it was decided to change the Lithuanian flag." Any further considerations regarding the flag change ended with the occupation of Lithuania by the Soviet Union in June 1940.

== See also ==
- List of flags of Lithuania
- Tautiška giesmė
- Coat of arms of Lithuania
