= Borja Toranzo =

Argentine philanthropist and patriot

- Born: October 10, 1759; San Juan, Viceroyalty of Peru
- Died: October 30, 1847 (aged 88); Argentine Confederation
- Known for: Philanthropy
- Spouse: Estanislao de Zavalla y Zavala

Borja Toranzo (10 October 1759 – 30 October 1847) was an Argentine philanthropist and patriot. She was one of the most important collaborators of José de San Martín, General of the Army of the Andes. She is considered one of the most important women in the history of San Juan Province.

== Biography ==
Borja Toranzo was born in San Juan, then part of the Corregimiento de Cuyo in the Spanish Empire, on 10 October 1759 to a family of sound financial and social standing. When the May Revolution took place in 1810, Toranzo joined the independence movement and donated a sum of four pesos fuertes to a fund in the Intendencia de Cuyo to buy arms for the Army of the North on 1 August 1812. During the preparation of the Army of the Andes, a public fundraiser was held to buy equipment and arms for the troops. In June 1815, donated to this cause some of her gems and a monetary sum of 111 pesos 5 reales.

Toranzo married young to army Lieutenant Estanislao de Zavalla y Zavala, who had children from his first marriage. When she was widowed, Toranzo had to care for the stepchildren and three children of her own, Pedro José, Matías, and Juana Agustina Zavalla Toranzo. Pedro José was a deputy of the first provincial legislature and Matías would become a successful business who built a fortune in Buenos Aires via industrialization and the exportation of oils and fats.
