= Bans on communist symbols =

Symbols that are most commonly associated with communism: the hammer and sickle, the red star, and the red flag

Countries where: All communist symbols are banned Certain communist symbols are banned Communist symbols were formerly banned

Communist symbols have been banned, in part or in whole, by a number of the world's countries. As part of a broader process of decommunization, these bans have mostly been proposed or implemented in countries that belonged to the Eastern Bloc during the Cold War, including some post-Soviet states. In some countries, the bans also extend to prohibit the propagation of communism in any form, with varying punishments applied to violators. Though the bans imposed by these countries nominally target the communist ideology, they may be accompanied by popular anti-leftist sentiment and therefore a de facto ban on all leftist philosophies, such as socialism, while not explicitly passing legislation to ban them.

== Summary table ==
Country / Region	Legality of communist symbols	Start date	Exceptions/Notes
Czech Republic	Illegal	1 January 2026	Banned since 2026, exception if not used for promotional purposes
Estonia	Illegal	24 January 2007	Exceptions for symbols not Soviet-related and when not used for propaganda purposes
Georgia	Illegal	2011	Exceptions for symbols not Soviet-related and when not used for propaganda purposes
Germany	Legal	1956	Use is legal unless the symbol is associated with banned organisations (e.g. KPD); general use (e.g. Hammer and Sickle) is not banned if not tied to unconstitutional groups
Hungary	Legal	2000	Ban on totalitarian symbols was annulled in 2013 following a ruling by the European Court of Human Rights that it violated freedom of expression
Indonesia	Illegal	1966	All forms of communist expression have banned since 1966, exceptions for educational purposes
Latvia	Illegal	11 April 2013	Exceptions for symbols not Soviet-related and when not used for propaganda purposes
Lithuania	Illegal	2008	Exception for when not used for propaganda purposes
Moldova	Legal	2012	Overturned as unconstitutional by the Constitutional Court in 2013
Poland	Legal	2009	Ban was found unconstitutional by the Polish Constitutional Tribunal in 2011 on the grounds of free expression
South Korea	Illegal	1 December 1948	Exceptions for educational purposes and for symbols not related to North Korea
Turkey	Legal	1936	Repealed with the Anti-Terror Law of Turkey in 1991
Ukraine	Illegal	9 April 2015	General ban since 2015
United States	Legal	1919	Ban was in effect in some states in 1919–1920

== General bans ==
=== Czech Republic ===
In 1991, in Czechoslovakia, the criminal code was amended with w § 260, which banned propaganda of movements which aimed at suppressing human rights and freedoms. This applied to any ideology, for example Nazi or neo-fascist groups. But the specific mention of communism was not included, so the communist symbols were not outright banned. However, in 2005 there was a petition in the Czech Republic to ban the promotion of communism, and in 2007 there was a proposed amendment to the law to ban communist symbols. Both attempts initially failed, but in July 2025, President Petr Pavel signed a law that would amend section 403 of the criminal code, criminalizing the promotion of communist ideology in the same law as Nazi propaganda, with punishments ranging from 1 to 5 years in prison. It came into force on 1 January 2026, with exceptions for educational, scientific or artistic uses.

=== Indonesia ===
"Communism / Marxism–Leninism" (official terminology) was banned in Indonesia following the aftermath of the 30 September Movement and the subsequent anti-communist massacre, by the adoption of TAP MPRS no. XXV/MPRS/1966 in conjunction with Law no. 27/1999 in 1999 (the corresponding explanatory memorandums of whom explain that "[Communism / Marxism-Leninism includes] the struggle fundaments and tactics taught by ... Stalin, Mao Tse Tung et cetera ..."), which are still in force. The law does not explicitly declare a ban on symbols of communism, but Indonesian police frequently use the law to arrest people displaying them. Some of its violators were people with no knowledge of symbols of communism, in which cases the authorities frequently released them with only minor punishments or small fines. The display of such symbols in an attempt to propagate "Communist / Marxist-Leninist" ideals are considered a high treason, and could be punished by up to 20 years imprisonment.

Other socialist and left-wing symbols, while not officially prohibited by law (as social democracy and democratic socialism itself remains acceptable in the country), are still widely condemned by the Indonesian government and considered as being closely related to communism. Such symbols include the red star, the red flag, socialist heraldry, and anthems or slogans such as The Internationale and "Workers of the world, unite!". Despite this, The Internationale was still used during International Labour Day. It is not known whether the symbols of ruling communist parties in other ASEAN countries, such as Vietnam and Laos, are also outlawed in Indonesia, affecting the bilateral relations between Indonesia and those two countries as well.

In addition, since the New Order regime took power in 1967, the hammer and sickle has been highly stigmatized in the country, similar to the stigma surrounding Nazi symbolism in the Western world and the Imperial Japanese flag in South Korea.

In April 2017, Indonesian police detained a Malaysian tourist at a hotel in Mataram for wearing a T-shirt with an image of the hammer and sickle symbol. The tourist was not aware that communist symbols were banned in Indonesia. The police seized the T-shirt and released the tourist after giving him a warning. In May 2018, a Russian tourist was also detained by police in Bali for displaying a Soviet Victory Banner, which also contains the symbol.

=== Lithuania ===
Lithuania banned communist and Nazi symbols in 2008 under Article 188^{18} of the Code of Administrative Offences with the threat of a fine. Collection, antiquarian trade and educational activities are exempt from the ban. Article 5 of the Law on Meetings prohibits meetings involving Nazi and communist imagery.

=== Ukraine ===
In April 2015, the Verkhovna Rada passed a law banning communist and Nazi symbols, following the Revolution of Dignity and start of the war with Russia in 2014. Earlier, in 2012, the city of Lviv in Western Ukraine banned the public display of all communist symbols, including ones not related to Soviet communism. On 17 December 2015, all communist parties were officially banned in Ukraine. Singing or playing the former anthem of the Soviet Union, any other former anthems of the Soviet republics, or The Internationale is punishable with a sentence of up to five years in prison. In July 2019, the Constitutional Court upheld the law, equating communism to Nazism.

== Bans on certain symbols ==
=== Georgia ===
In Georgia, the use of Soviet-era communist symbols on government buildings is prohibited since 2011, as is their display in public spaces, although this law is rarely enforced by authorities. A ban on communist symbols was first proposed in 2010, but it failed to define the applicable sanctions. In 2014, there was a proposal to amend the ban to introduce clearer parameters.

=== Germany ===
The flag of the German Democratic Republic (East Germany) was outlawed as an unconstitutional and criminal symbol in West Germany and West Berlin, where it was referred to as the Spalterflagge (secessionist flag) until the late 1960s, when the ban was lifted. The flag and emblem of the now defunct Communist Party of Germany (KPD) is still banned in the country under section 86a of the German criminal code, while the hammer and sickle symbol itself is considered a universal symbol and is legally used by the contemporary German Communist Party (DKP) and various other organisations and media.

=== Latvia ===
In Latvia, the perception of the USSR is highly negative due to the Soviet occupation of the Baltic states. In June 2013, the Latvian parliament approved a ban on the display of Soviet and Nazi symbols at all public events. The ban involves flags, anthems, uniforms, and the Soviet hammer and sickle.

=== South Korea ===
It is illegal to display the flag of North Korea or the flag of the Workers' Party of Korea in South Korea. They are deemed unconstitutional symbols, although some exceptions exist, particularly during international sport events.

== Former bans ==
=== Hungary ===
Hungary had a law (Article 269/B of the Criminal Code (2000)) that banned the use of symbols of fascist and communist dictatorships. The same year, the Constitutional Court upheld the law when it was challenged, claiming that the involved restriction of the freedom of expression was justified. In July 2008, the European Court of Human Rights considered the challenge of Attila Vajnai, who was charged with a misdemeanor for use of the red star, and declared the Hungarian law to be in violation of the freedom of expression. The Court recognized the gross violations by the Nazi and communist regimes; however, it noted that modern Hungary is a stable democracy with negligible chance of dictatorship, therefore restrictions on the freedom of expression have no justification in the country in the form of a "clear, pressing and specific social need". Eventually, the law was annulled in 2013 by the Constitutional Court, citing the lack of precise definition and the European Court of Human Rights. In March 2017, Prime Minister Viktor Orbán introduced a draft law that would outlaw merchandise featuring "totalitarian symbols", which includes symbols like the Nazi swastika or the communist five-pointed red star. This included the red star on the logo of the Dutch brewing company Heineken, which the company claimed has no communist origins or political connotations, and which the company will defend like all other trademarks.

=== Moldova ===
In 2009, such a ban was proposed in Moldova by parliamentarian Oleg Serebryan, and the law came into effect in 2012. The Constitutional Court of Moldova found the law unconstitutional and overturned it in 2013.

=== Poland ===
In 2009, Poland amended Article 256 of its penal code, banning the display of "fascist, communist [and] other totalitarian symbols" unless they were being used "as part of artistic, educational, collecting or academic activity." On 19 July 2011, the Constitutional Tribunal of Poland found the amendment to be partially unconstitutional as it limited freedom of expression. In June 2017, Poland updated its "decommunization" legislation to include Soviet propaganda monuments, prompting negative reactions from the Russian government. While the "promotion of communist ideas" remains illegal in Poland, the display of communist symbols is no longer explicitly prohibited.

=== Taiwan (Republic of China) ===
The Kuomintang government in Taiwan outlawed the flag of the People's Republic of China in 1952, pursuant to the Temporary Provisions against the Communist Rebellion in the country's constitution. The temporary provisions were repealed in 1991, but a general ban on communist ideology and symbolism in the National Security Law of the Republic of China, promulgated in 1976, was not annulled until 2011.

In late 2020, a legislator from the Democratic Progressive Party proposed an amendment to the National Security Law which would ban the public display of the flag of the People's Republic of China. However, as of 2026, no such legislation has been passed.

=== Turkey ===
In the early republican years, authorities targeted communist literature and publications under the Treason Law and the 1925 Law on Maintenance of Order. The crackdown was permanently codified with the 1936 incorporation of Articles 141 and 142 to the Turkish Penal Code, adapted from the Italian Rocco Code. Article 142 specifically outlawed propaganda aimed at "establishing the dominance of one social class over others" and under this broad provision, state security apparatuses and courts routinely treated the display of the hammer and sickle, red stars, and revolutionary flags as punishable offenses carrying 5-10 years prison terms, or sometimes the death penalty. This systemic ban was dismantled in April 1991 with the passage of the Anti-Terror Law which formally repealed Articles 141, 142, and 143 of the Penal Code. With the reform, dissemination of communist ideas and the display of classical communist emblems in civil and political parties was officially decriminalized.

=== United States ===
During the Red Scare of 1919–20 in the United States, many states passed laws forbidding the display of red flags, including Minnesota, South Dakota, Oklahoma, and California. In Stromberg v. California, the United States Supreme Court held that such laws were unconstitutional.

However, after the Crucial Communism Teaching Act had passed the U.S. House of Representatives, it is unknown whether the bill will either give way to or be joined by other bills against the ideology of communism, including the re-bans, full or partial, on communist symbols, during the second Trump administration.

== Proposed anti-communist legislation ==
=== Albania ===
Albania's Institute for Communist Crimes (ICC) proposed a ban on communist-era films, sparking hostile reactions from the public.

=== Brazil ===
In 2016, Eduardo Bolsonaro, a federal deputy for São Paulo and the son of then-deputy and future president Jair Bolsonaro, proposed a bill to criminalize the promotion of communism. The draft proposed that offenders be given two to five years in prison and a fine if they manufacture, commercialize, distribute or convey symbols or propaganda that use the hammer or sickle or any other means of dissemination favourable to communism. As of January 2026, the bill is in the Constitution and Justice Commission of the Chamber of Deputies of Brazil.

=== Bulgaria ===
In Bulgaria, lawmakers voted on the first reading of a proposed law on 24 November 2016 to make the public display of communist symbols illegal. The law, known as the "Criminal Nature of the Communist Regime", requires that signs and items created during the communist regime glorifying the former communist party and its leaders be removed from public places. The proposal, however, was never put to a second reading, never signed by the President of Bulgaria nor published in Bulgaria's State Gazette and hence never became law. Both the parliamentary session and convocation in which the law was proposed later ended, thus rendering the proposal dead.

=== Estonia ===
In early 2007, the Riigikogu was proceeding with a draft bill amending the Penal Code to make the public use of Soviet and Nazi symbols punishable if used in a manner disturbing the public peace or inciting hatred. The bill did not come into effect as it passed only the first reading in the Riigikogu. In 2015, Estonia's Justice Ministry drafted a bill that would ban explicitly both Communist and Nazi symbols, however, the law did not pass. Estonia did not ban symbols themselves, but since the early 2000s, laws against promoting totalitarian regimes were established and propaganda of Soviet symbols became in practice restricted.

=== European Union ===
In January 2005, Vytautas Landsbergis, backed by other Members of the European Parliament, such as József Szájer from Hungary, urged a ban on the communist symbols in the European Union, in addition to Nazi symbols.

In February 2005, the European Commission rejected calls for a proposed Europe-wide ban on Nazi symbols to be extended to cover communist symbols as well, on the basis that it was not appropriate to deal with this issue in rules aimed at combatting racism. However, this rejection did not rule out the individual member states having their own laws in this respect.

In December 2010, the European Commission published a report titled "The memory of the crimes committed by totalitarian regimes in Europe" addressed to the European Parliament and the Council of the European Union, in which it mentions the banning of communist symbols by some member states (Czech Republic, Poland, Hungary, and Lithuania) and concludes that "the European Union has a role to play, within the scope of its powers in this area, to contribute to the processes engaged in the Member States to face up to the legacy of totalitarian crimes".

In September 2019, the European Parliament approved a joint motion for a "resolution on the importance of European remembrance for the future of Europe" with 535 votes in favour, 66 against and 52 abstentions. Specifically, in points 17 and 18 of the resolution, "expresses concern about the continued use of symbols belonging to totalitarian systems in the public sphere and for commercial purposes", as well as noting "the continued existence in public spaces in some Member States of monuments and memorials (parks, squares, streets etc.) glorifying totalitarian regimes, which paves the way for the distortion of historical facts about the consequences of the Second World War and for the propagation of the totalitarian political system".

=== Romania ===
Law 51/2026, (article 3. h) on the National Security of Romania considers the following as threats to national security: "the initiation, organisation, perpetration, or the supporting in any way of the totalitarian or extremist actions of a communist, fascist, iron guardist, or of any other origin, of the racial, anti-Semitic, revisionist, separatist actions that can endanger in any way the unity and territorial integrity of Romania, as well as the instigation to deeds that can put in, danger the order of the state governed by the rule of law". However, symbols are not specifically mentioned in the law.

On 22 December 2025, the Save Romania Union (USR) proposed to outlaw communist symbols in public places, with penalties ranging from 3 to 10 years in prison for communist organizations and 3 months to 3 years for communist propaganda.

== See also ==
- Anti-communism
- Bans on Nazi symbols
- Communist chic
- Communist terrorism
- Decommunization
- Denazification
- Hammer and sickle § Legal status
- Mass killings under communist regimes
- Red-tagging in the Philippines
- Red star § Legal status
- Strafgesetzbuch section 86a
- Red Scare
