= State Gazette =

Government gazette of Bulgaria

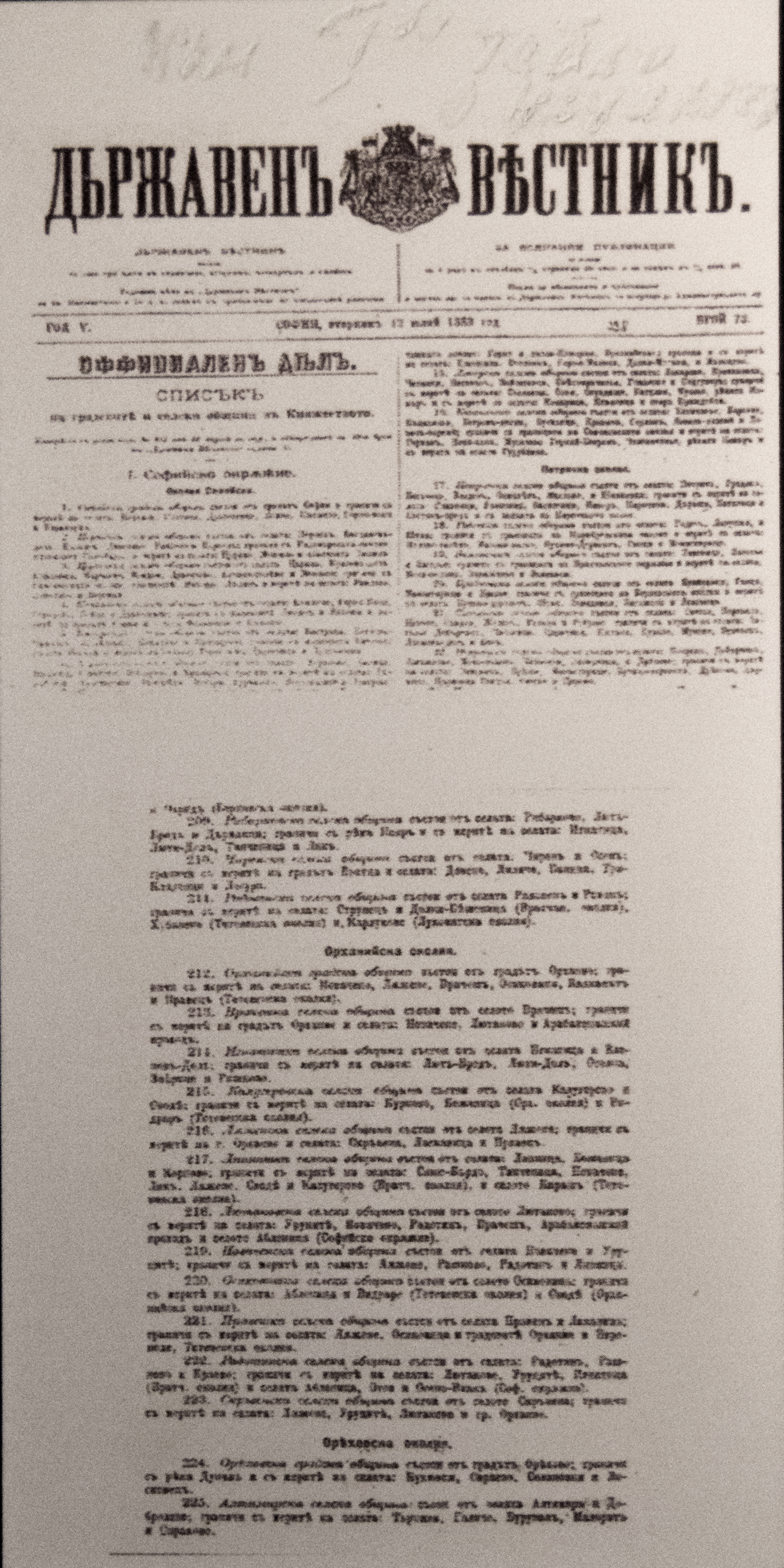
An 1883 issue

The State Gazette (Bulgarian: Държавен Вестник, romanized: Darzhaven Vestnik, abbreviated DV (ДВ) is the gazette of record of Bulgaria and has been in print since 1879.

The State Gazette was founded by state decree of Prince Alexander of Battenberg on 19 July 1879. Its first edition was 28 July 1879. It was first published weekly, and then daily.

The print edition of the gazette is divided into two sections. The "Official section" contains bills promulgated by the National Assembly, decrees by the Council of Ministers, international treaties, and other legal acts. The "Unofficial section" includes administrative deeds (executive decisions) by ministers and heads of national or municipal institutions and agencies, announcements, court summons, etc. The online edition contains all public procurement and concession notices since January 5, 2005.

The publication of the State Gazette is regulated by law and administered by the National Assembly; there are regular editions every Tuesday and Thursday, as well as additional ones as needed. The current circulation is approximately 21,000 copies. Since 2008, the gazette has been available online.
