= Tadeusz Dowgird =

Lithuanian painter, archaeologist and nobleman

Tadas Daugirdas
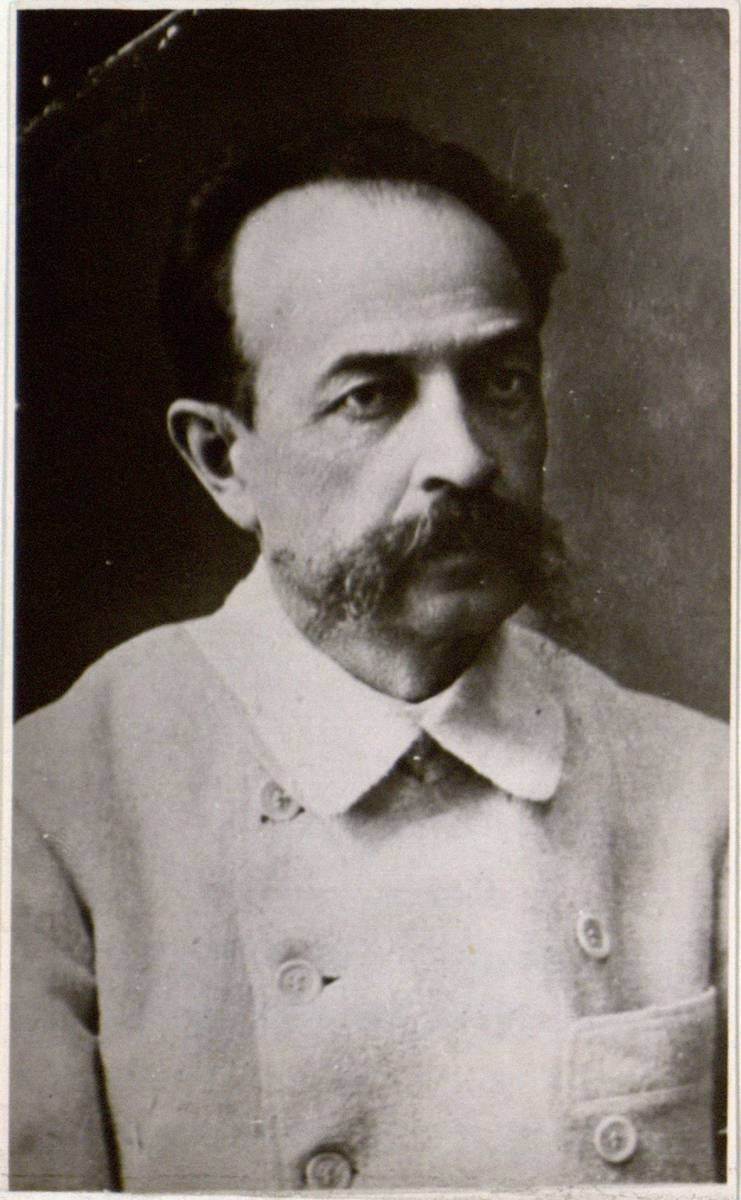
- Tadas Daugirdas in 1905.
- Born: February 27, 1852; Torbino, Novgorod Oblast, Russia
- Died: October 29, 1919 (aged 67); Kaunas, Lithuania
- Resting place: Ariogala, Lithuania
- Education: St. Petersburg, Munich Academy of Fine Arts, Vilnius and Warsaw
- Known for: Painting, Archaeology, Lithuanian ethnography, Kaunas museum founder and curator
- Movement: Realism

Tadas Daugirdas (Polish: Tadeusz Dowgird; February 27, 1852 – October 29, 1919, in Kaunas, Lithuania) was a Lithuanian painter and archaeologist, nobleman of the Łabędź coat of arms.

== Biography ==
His father Michał Mikołaj Dowgird was an engineer building a railway linking Moscow and St Petersburg, married to Maria née Jeleńska. Tadeusz Dowgrid was born in Russia, the family moved to the family house in Plemborg, Samogitia, in 1856.

In 1869, Tadeusz Dowgird took his early studies in Vilnius. For a short while, between 1870 and 1872, he went to live in St. Petersburg, where he continued to study, to later move to Munich for four years (between 1872 and 1876), and deepened his studies at the Academy of Fine Arts therein. In 1882, Dowgird took part in the Courland Literature and Art Society. The year 1905 marked the beginning of his political career, when he joined the Lithuanian Seimas, while being a conservator at the Kaunas City Museum. He became its director in 1909.

In the years of 1910 and 1914, Tadeusz Dowgird was a major player in running the Lithuanian Art Society's exhibitions. During the First World War, he continued to guard the museum in Kaunas, while writing a detailed diary during Germany's occupation of the Baltics. Published articles in Lithuanian newspapers. In 1917, Dowgird participated in the commission that designed the Lithuanian flag, with his plans for the color yellow to join the triband being accepted, together with its red and green color bands. In 1919, in his final year, he became the Chairman of the State Archaeological Commission (VAK). In February of that same year, prototypes created by Tadeusz Dowgird and Kazimieras Šimonis were chosen to be published for the first collection of Lithuanian postage stamps, printed in Berlin.

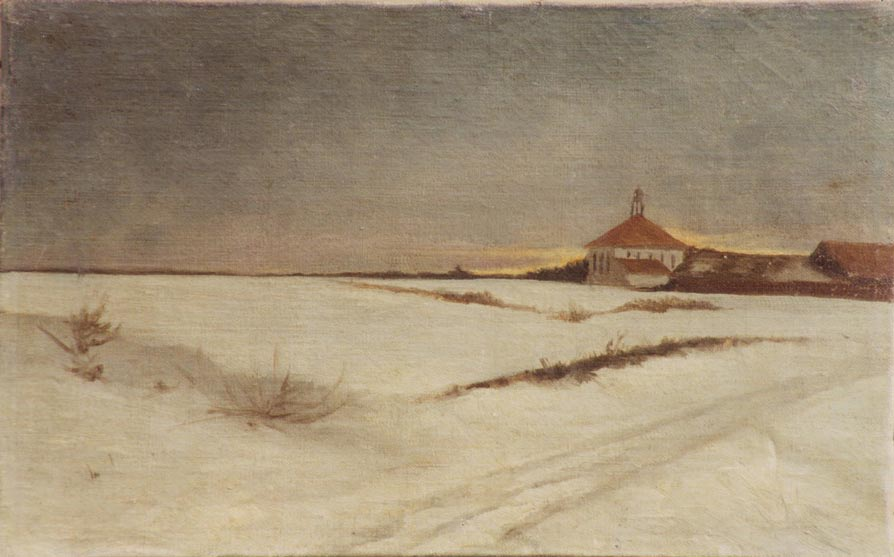
Winter landscape

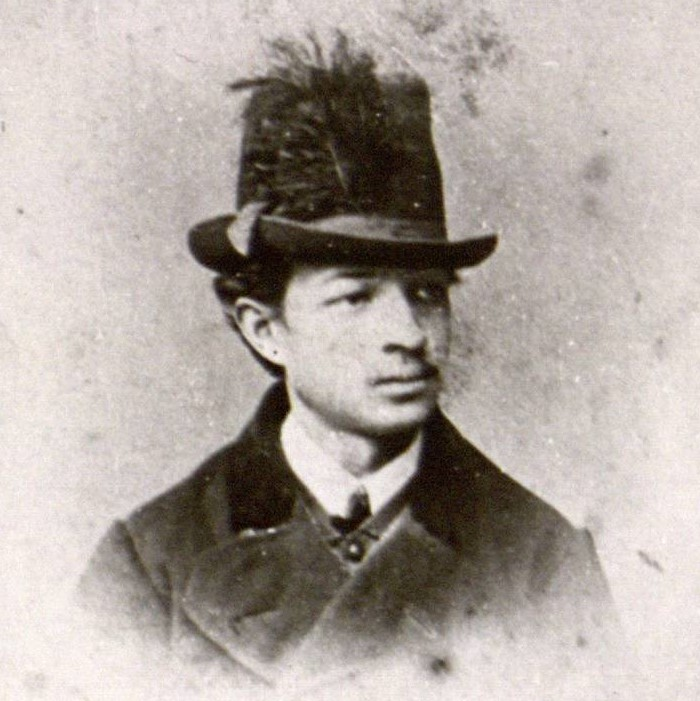
Tadeusz Dowgird in 1890.

== Family ==
Tadeusz Dowgird married Kazimiera Daszkiewicz in 1883, the daughter of Aleksander Daszkiewicz and Kazimiera Helena née Denajkowicz-Ostrogska. They had four sons: Michał, Adam, Tadeusz, and Witold. Witold Dowgird was a distinguished actor and theater director, recognized for his contributions to the development of the Polish theater scene in Lithuania during the interwar period.
