= Flag of Charlotte =

City of Charlotte
- Proportion: 3:5
- Adopted: May 6, 1929; 97 years ago
- Design: A white saltire on a light blue field with the Seal of Charlotte in the center
- Proportion: 3:5
- Adopted: 1985
- Design: A green field with a white crown in the center

The flag of Charlotte, North Carolina, was adopted in 1929 and consists of a white saltire on a blue field, with the city seal in the center. A secondary flag, with a green field and a white crown in the center, was introduced in 1985 and is primarily used at city government buildings. Charlotte is one of the few places to have two official flags with equal status. The government of Mecklenburg County, while having its own flag, has made use of the 1985 flag at official events.

== Design and symbolism ==
=== 1929 flag ===
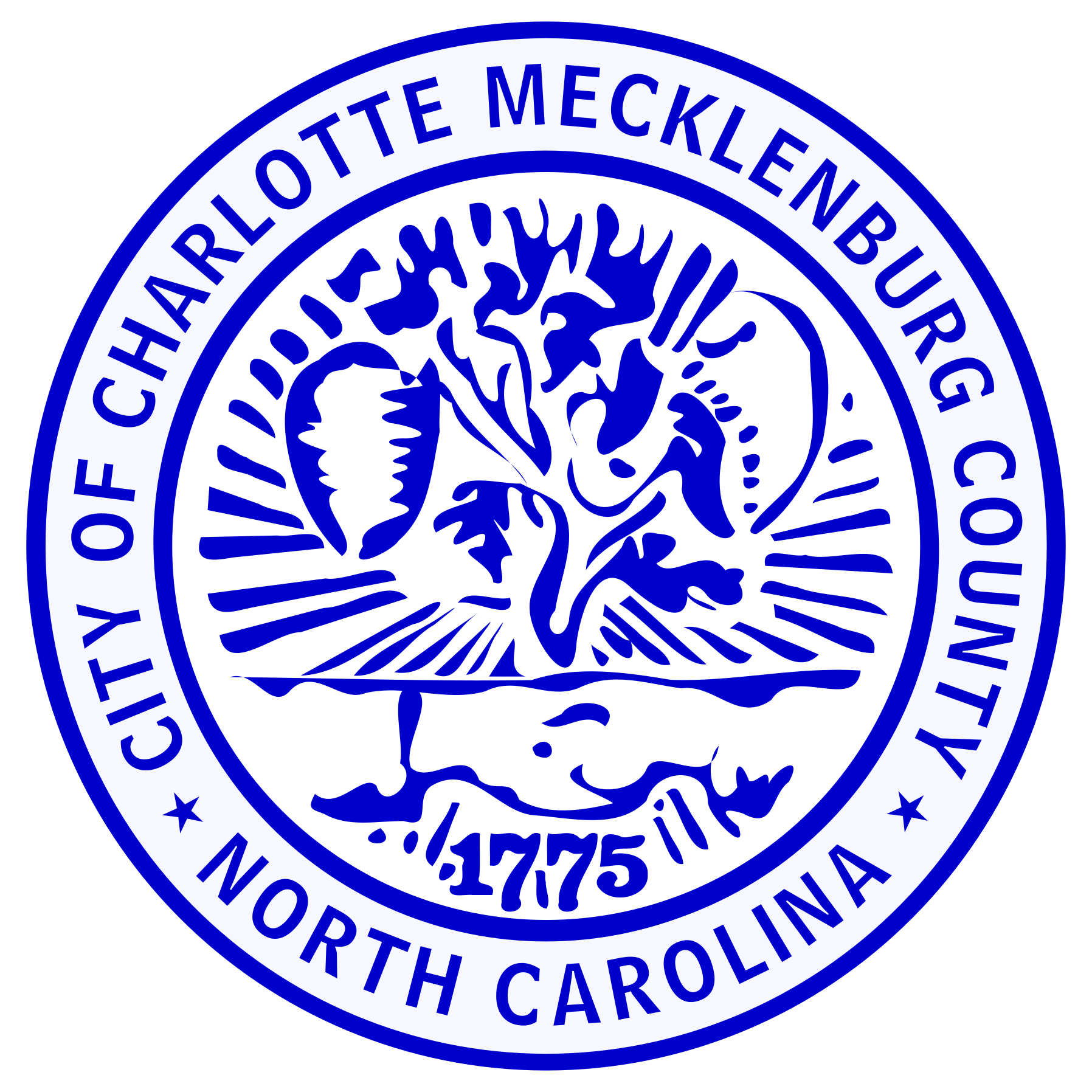
Seal used on the flag. This seal was historically used in the early 20th century and was designed on the orders of mayor Charles A. Bland. It was rescinded at an unknown time and replaced with the current seal.

Blue and white are the official colors of Charlotte, as reflected in the color choice for the field and saltire. The seal depicts a tree in the center, symbolizing growth. The rays radiating from the tree affirm this, representing hope for a bright future. Hanging off the tree is a hornet's nest, a Revolutionary War-era symbol. The symbol was explained in a city pamphlet, which reads:

... in the American Revolution, her citizens fought so fiercely that a British general compared being in Charlotte to being in a hornet's nest.

More revolution symbolism can be found within the seal, with a Liberty Cap present, hanging on the tree. Beneath the tree are two hands clasped. Furthering the revolution symbolism is the date "1775" below the hands, the year the Mecklenburg Declaration of Independence was supposedly adopted, one year before the Continental Congress adopted their declaration. This revolution symbolism is to convey the idea of freedom for Charlotte's citizens. Surrounding the seal is the text "CITY OF CHARLOTTE MECKLENBURG COUNTY" on the top portion, and "NORTH CAROLINA" on the bottom portion. Separating the two portions are two blue five-pointed stars.

=== 1985 flag ===
The green field is used to convey ideals the city focuses on. As a city communications representative put it:

"Green provides an association with the City's environmental assets, reputation for prosperity, and good quality of life, including the City's tree canopy, visitors' ratings for cleanliness, national reputation as a banking/financial center (and) commitment to job creation."

Green has become somewhat of a de facto official color of the city. The city website uses many variants of green, e-mail signatures of city employees are green, city signs often use green, the University of North Carolina at Charlotte's official color is green and the city's streetcars are painted green. Charlotte is also known for its tree canopy, which exhibits brilliant green colors during the spring, summer, and early autumn. The city has one of the highest percentages of its land covered by urban forestry among United States cities. The crown, which occupies about three-fifths of the flag, is an homage to the "Queen City" nickname that Charlotte has. It gained the nickname from the city's namesake, Queen Charlotte, consort of King George III. The crown also represents the unity that all city agencies have as they cooperate for the good of citizens. The crown is the official logo for the city.

Some designs of the 1985 flag include a service mark at the lower right corner of the crown.

== History ==
The official flag was adopted by the city council on May 6, 1929. The designer of the flag is unknown. The governmental flag was adopted in 1985. The designer for this flag is also unknown. The crown symbol is an officially registered trademark of the city. Only government entities or city-owned properties can fly the alternative flag. The official flag ranked 66th in a 2004 North American Vexillological Association survey of 150 American city flags. The flag ranked second out of three North Carolina city flags.
