= Almendros =

- Municipality
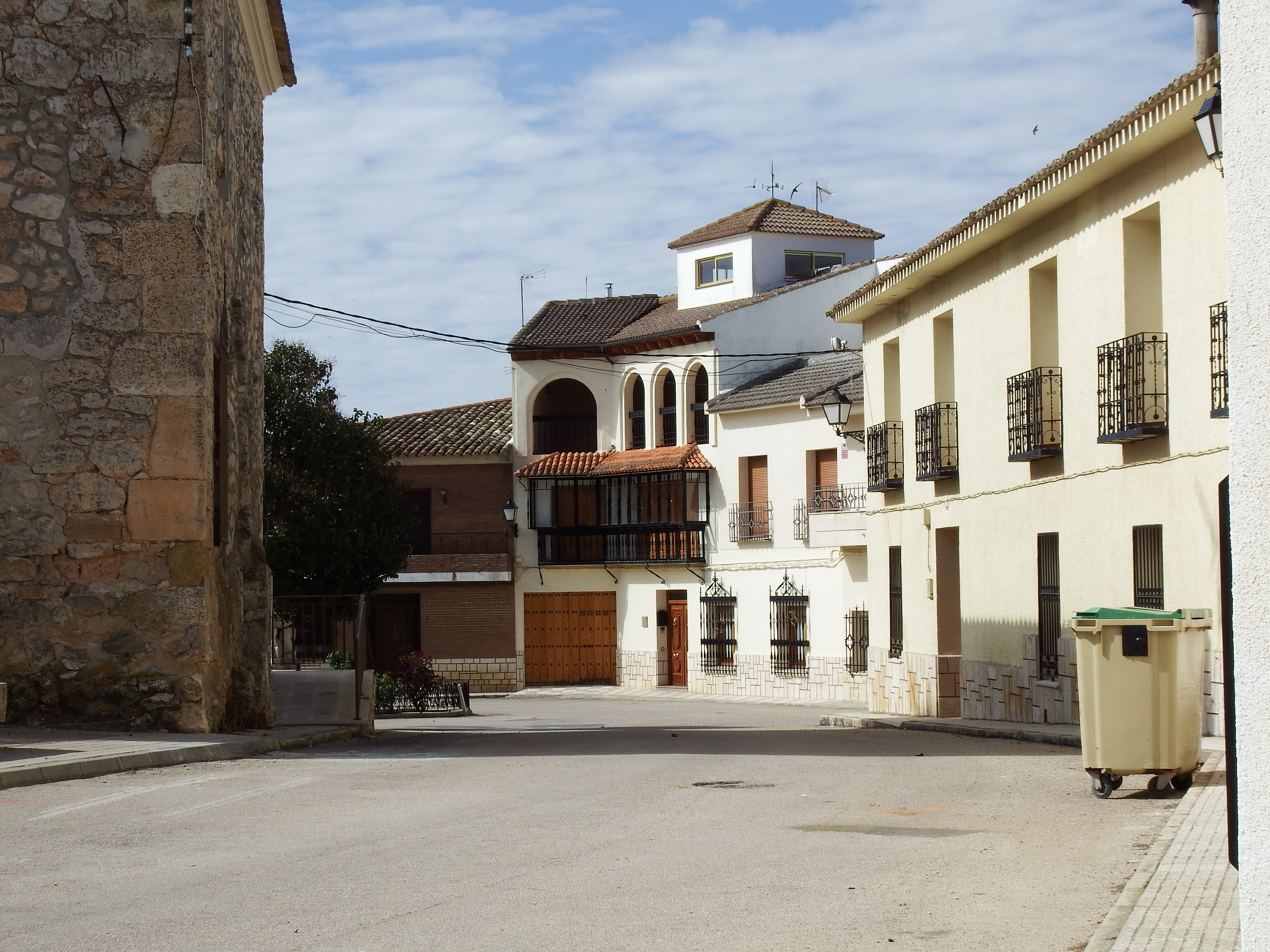

- Flag Coat of arms

- Location within Spain Location within Castilla-La Mancha
- Coordinates: 39°56′N 2°53′W
- Country: Spain
- Autonomous community: Castile-La Mancha
- Province: Cuenca

Population (2025-01-01)
  - Total: 240
- Time zone: UTC+1 (CET)
  - Summer (DST): UTC+2 (CEST)

Almendros is a municipality in Cuenca, Castile-La Mancha, Spain. It had a population of 239 as of 2020.

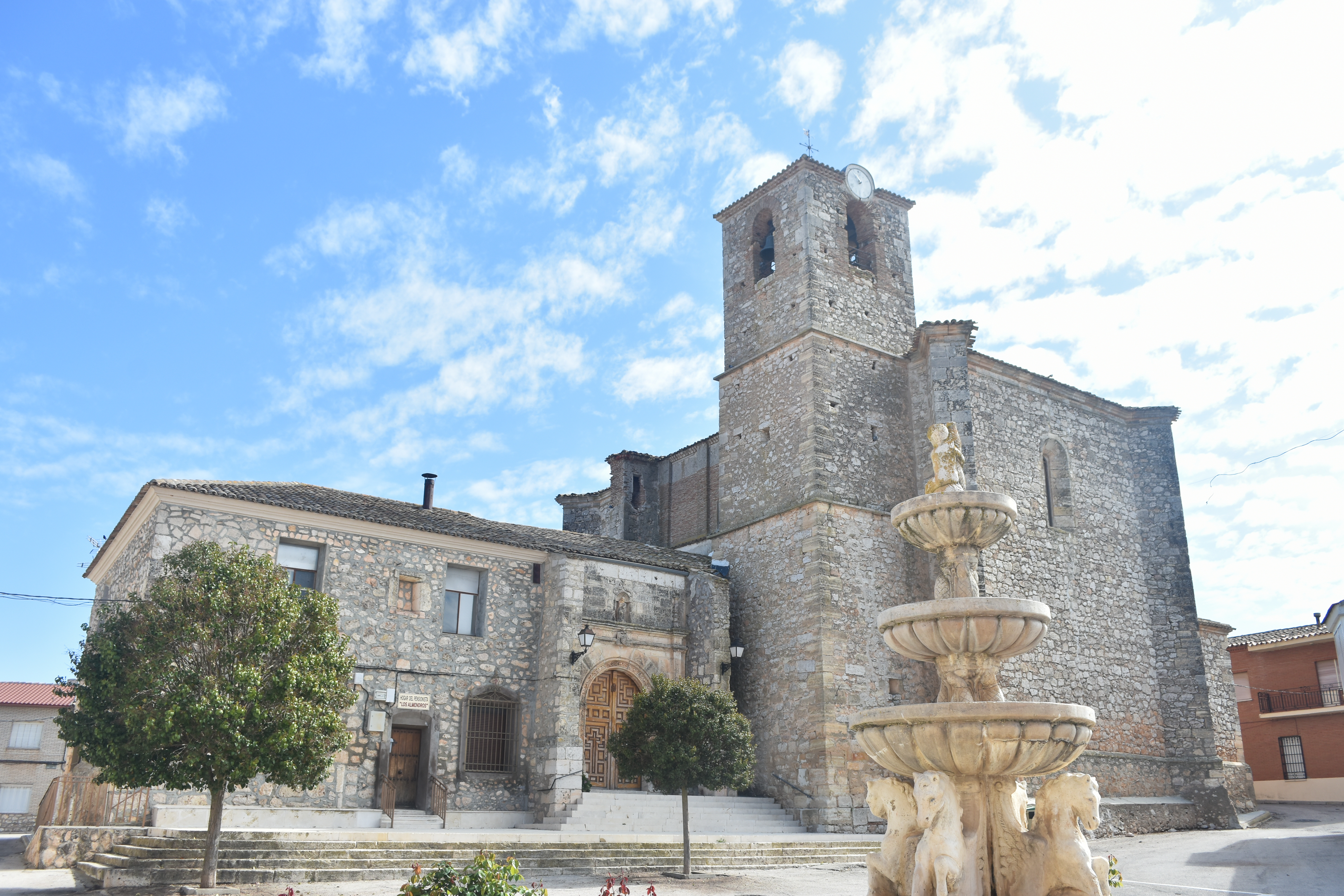
