= Dömsöd =

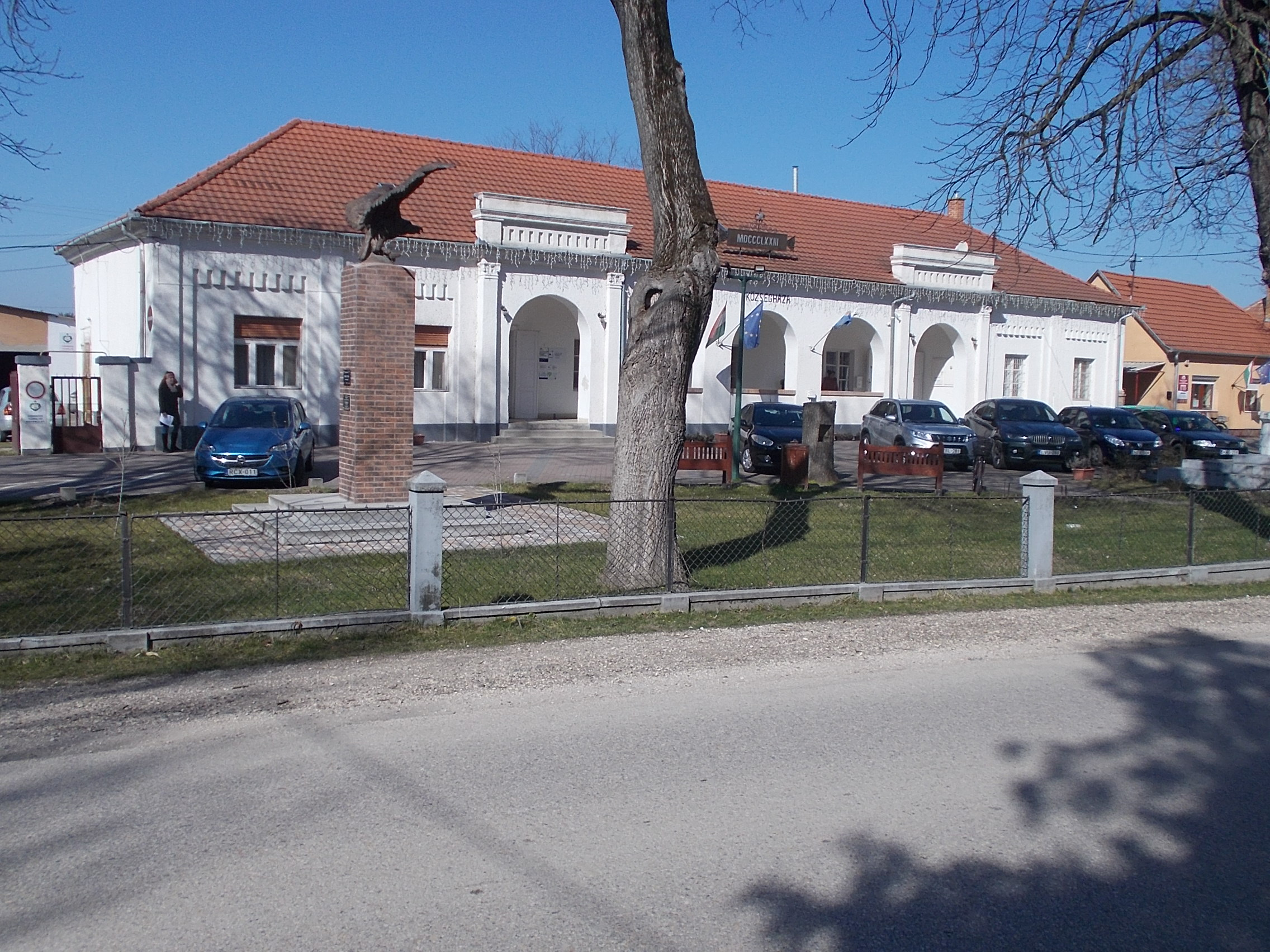
- Village hall

- Coat of arms

- Location of Dömsöd in Hungary
- Coordinates: 47.09442°N 19.00892°E
- Country: Hungary
- Region: Central Hungary
- County: Pest
- Subregion: Ráckevei
- Rank: Town

Area
  - Total: 72.42 km^{2} (27.96 sq mi)

Population (1 January 2008)
  - Total: 5,784
  - Density: 79.87/km^{2} (206.9/sq mi)
- Time zone: UTC+1 (CET)
  - Summer (DST): UTC+2 (CEST)
- Postal code: 2344
- Area code: +36 24
- KSH code: 29647
- Website: www.domsod.hu

Dömsöd is a village in Pest county, Hungary.
