= Rocco Code =

Former Italian list of crimes punishable by death

Rocco code was an Italian list of crimes which were punishable with the death penalty, it was introduced in 1930 and was put in force on July 1, 1931, during the Italian Empire. It also reintroduced capital punishment for more common crimes.

It was used sparsely until the outbreak of war in 1940 and a total of 26 executions were carried out until 1943 compared to Germany's 80,000 legal executions in Nazi Germany.
