= List of national flags by design =

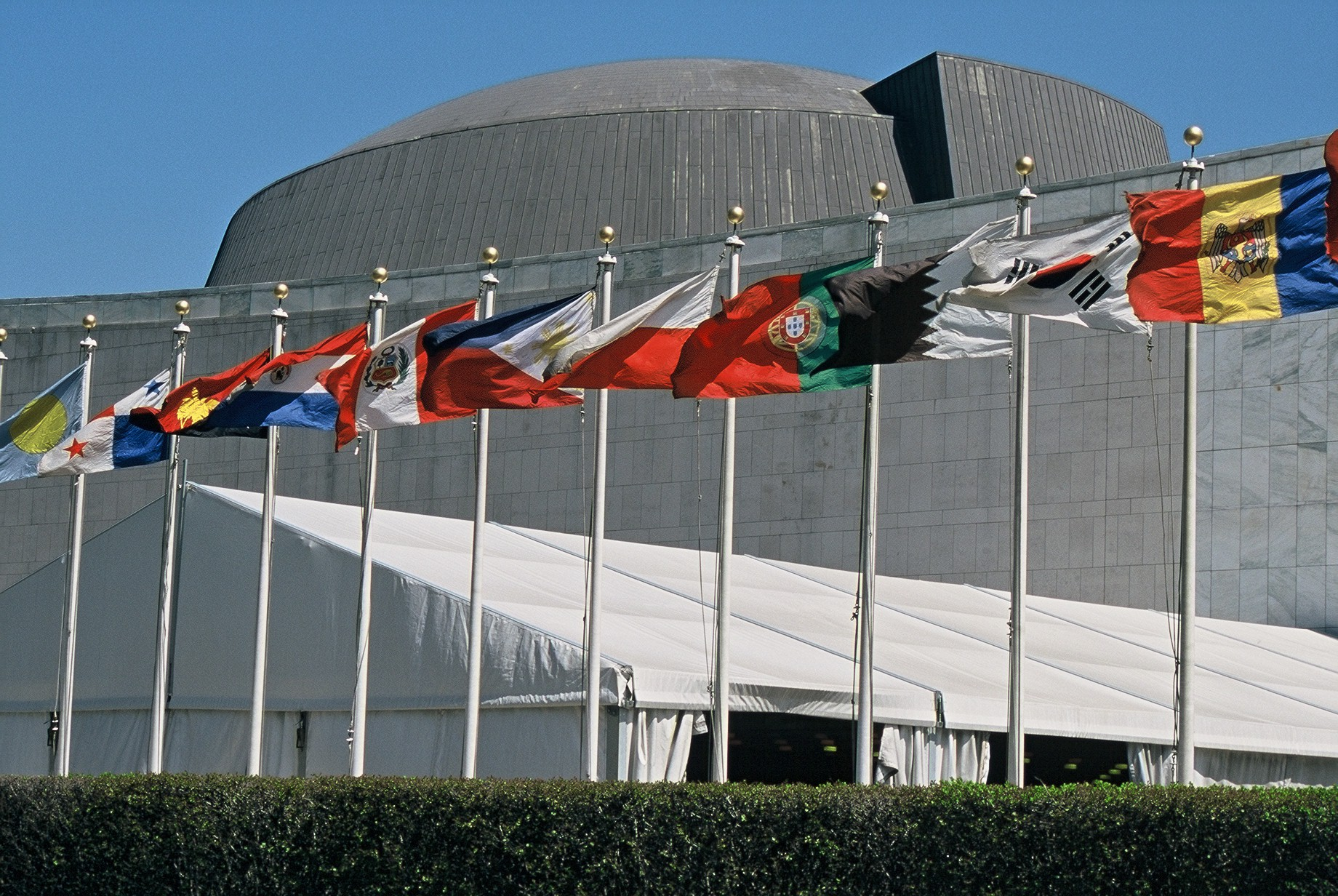
Flags of member nation-states flying outside the Headquarters of the United Nations in New York (2007)

The parts of a flag using the terms of vexillology

A national flag represents and symbolizes a country or nation-state. Flags, and related (royal) standards, ensigns, banners, and pennons (pennants), exist in many shapes and designs, which often connote meaning about the represented nation, though the majority are rectangular or square-shaped.

Flag designs commonly include charges, such as crescent moons, crosses, stars, stripes, and suns. Layout elements include cantons, the flag's aspect ratio, or the use of a non-rectangular shape. Sometimes, national flags are used to represent languages for tourist information and websites.

Many countries with shared history, culture, ethnicity, or religion have similarities in their flags that represent this connection. These flag families in this list within the same category may represent these shared connections; for example, Scandinavian countries use the Nordic cross on their flags. Sometimes, the design similarity may be a coincidence, as is the case with the red-and-white flags of Indonesia, Monaco, and Poland.

Unless stated, all flags shown in this list are the nation's civil flag (the vexillological symbol of identification from FIAV, Fédération internationale des associations vexillologiques), or the national flag of the nation state or sovereign country recognized as such by the United Nations. State flags, (usually those of the government), along with the flags of autonomous countries, regions, and territories of a UN nation state are annotated as such in italics.

Flags that are widely used but without any legal basis (de facto), are marked with the vexillological symbol.

== Shape and aspect ratio ==
Most flags are rectangular. In Nordic nations, some state flags are swallowtail shaped, though the civil flag is oblong. The only nation state whose civil flag is non-rectangular is Nepal.

A majority of national flags have a defined aspect ratio, the most common being 2:3, followed by 1:2, and only a few being 1:1 (square). Some nations' flags have several acceptable ratios or do not define any ratio; for example, the commonest aspect ratio of the United Kingdom's Union Jack is 1:2, followed by 2:3.

The following flags have a distinctive specified shape or aspect ratio
Flag of Belgium
– the aspect ratio is 13:15 ≈ 1:1.1538

Flag of Denmark
– a swallowtail shape particular to Nordic nations
(government/state flag only – civil flag is oblong)

Flag of Iceland
– a swallowtail shape particular to Nordic nations
(government/state flag only – civil flag is oblong)

Flag of Monaco
– the aspect ratio is 4:5 ≡ 1:1.25

Flag of Nepal
– the only non-rectangular national civil flag – being made with 5 sides – and the only one that is taller than wide, with the bordering aspect ratio of ≈ 6:5

Flag of Niger
– the aspect ratio is 6:7 ≈ 1:1.667

Flag of Norway
– a swallowtail shape particular to Nordic nations
(government/state flag only – civil flag is oblong)

Flag of Qatar
– the largest aspect ratio of any national flag – being over 2½ times as long as the height – of 11:28 ≈ 1:2.545

{Flag of El Salvador
– the aspect ratio is 18:29 ≈ 1:1.611
(parade version of the civil flag)

Flag of El Salvador
– the aspect ratio is 189:335 ≈ 1:1.772
(government/state flag – civil flag is without the arms)

Flag of Switzerland
– the aspect ratio is 1:1 – square-shaped

Flag of Togo
– the aspect ratio is of Fibonacci's golden ratio that is approximately 1:1.618 ≈ 13:21

Flag of Vatican City
– the aspect ratio was defined as 1:1 in Article 23 of the 2023 Fundamental Law of Vatican City State – square-shaped – the prior flag of 2001→2023 was, but did not have to be square-shaped.

The Wiphala
– the aspect ratio is 1:1 – square-shaped – with implied 13 diagonals of squares in a rainbow pattern of seven colors in a seven-by-seven square
(alternative recognized flag of Bolivia used since 2009 for the native peoples of South America in Bolivia and surrounding nations)

== Borders ==
Flag of Grenada
– a red border

Flag of Maldives
– a wide red border

Flag of Montenegro
– a golden border

Flag of Nepal
– a thin blue border

Flag of Sri Lanka
– a golden border

Flag of Tibet
— a yellow border on three sides of "the Snow Lion Flag"

== Diagonal divisions and stripes ==
Diagonally divided field
Flag of Bhutan

Flag of China
(1862→1889)

Flag of Christmas Island

Flag of Papua New Guinea

Diagonal stripes
Flag of Bonaire
– single broad off-centre diagonal white stripe
(The Caribbean Netherlands, overseas territory of the Dutch Crown)

Flag of Brunei
– two diagonal white and black stripes

The Wiphala
– implied 13 diagonals of squares in a rainbow pattern of seven colors in a seven-by-seven square
(alternative recognized flag of Bolivia used since 2009 for the native peoples of South America in Bolivia and surrounding nations)

Fimbriated diagonal stripes
Flag of the Democratic Republic of the Congo
– single red diagonal stripe fimbriated in yellow

Flag of Namibia
– single red diagonal stripe fimbriated in white

Flag of Saint Kitts and Nevis
– single black diagonal stripe fimbriated in yellow

Flag of the Solomon Islands
– single thin fimbriated yellow diagonal stripe

Flag of Tanzania
– single black diagonal stripe fimbriated in yellow

Flag of Trinidad and Tobago
– single black diagonal stripe fimbriated in white

Many radiating diagonal stripes
Flag of North Macedonia
(from 1995)

Flag of the Marshall Islands
– two radiating stripes on a navy field
(self-governing island nation-state in free association with the US)

Flag of the Seychelles
– five radiating stripes

Flag of Tibet
– twelve alternating red and navy blue stripes radiating from the central sun on "the Snow Lion Flag"
(1914→1951 and its use is continued by the Tibetan government-in-exile based in Dharamshala, Himachal Pradesh, India)

== Horizontal divisions and stripes ==
=== Horizontal bi-colour divisions and stripes ===
One horizontal bi-colour division – equal
Flag of Angola

Flag of Burkina Faso

Flag of Greenland
(overseas autonomous territory of Denmark)

Flag of Haiti

Flag of Indonesia

Flag of Liechtenstein

Flag of Monaco

Flag of Poland

Flag of Poland
(government/state flag only – civil flag is without the arms)

Flag of Singapore

Flag of San Marino
(just the civil flag is without the arms)

Flag of San Marino
(both the government/state flag and the civil flag)

Flag of Ukraine

Flag of Wales
(constituent semi-autonomous country of the United Kingdom)

One horizontal bi-colour division – unequal
Flag of the Azerbaijan SSR
(1951→1991 – constituent republic of the Soviet Union)

Flag of Gibraltar
(overseas territory of the UK)

Flag of the Ukrainian SSR
(1950→1992 – constituent republic of the Soviet Union)

One horizontal bi-colour division with a band or a pile (triangle) at the hoist
Flag of Belarus

Flag of the Byelorussian SSR
(1951→1991 – constituent republic of the Soviet Union)

Flag of Benin

Flag of the Czech Republic (Czechia)

Flag of Djibouti

Flag of Guinea-Bissau

Flag of Madagascar

Flag of Martinique
(overseas department of France to be concurrently displayed with the Tricoleur français)

Flag of the Philippines

Flag of Sint Maarten
(constituent island nation of the Kingdom of the Netherlands)

Three horizontal bi-colour stripes – equal
Flag of Argentina

Flag of Austria

Flag of Belarus
(1918→1919 and 1991→1995)

Flag of Honduras

Flag of Nicaragua

Flag of El Salvador

Flag of El Salvador
(government/state flag – civil flag is without the arms, but includes the motto)

Three horizontal bi-colour stripes – thin-and-thick
Flag of the Armenian SSR
(1952→1992 – constituent republic of the Soviet Union)

Flag of Belize

Flag of Cambodia

Flag of Curacao
(constituent island country within the Kingdom of the Netherlands)

Flag of French Polynesia
(overseas self-governing collectivity of France to be concurrently displayed with the Tricoleur français)

Flag of the Georgian SSR
(1951→1991 – constituent republic of the Soviet Union)

Flag of the Kazakh SSR
(1953→1992 – constituent republic of the Soviet Union)

Flag of Laos

Flag of Latvia

Flag of Lebanon

Flag of Mauritania

Flag of the Moldavian SSR
(1952→1992 – constituent republic of the Soviet Union)

Flag of Nauru

Flag of Spain

Flag of Transnistria
(unrecognized breakaway state from Moldova under military occupation by Russia)

Three horizontal bi-colour stripes with a band or a pile (triangle) at the hoist
Flag of the Bahamas

Flag of São Tomé and Príncipe

Three horizontal bi-colour stripes – fimbriated thin-and-thick
Flag of Botswana

Flag of the Estonian SSR
– wavy
(1940→1990 – constituent republic of the Soviet Union)

Flag of Eswatini

Flag of the Kirghiz SSR
(1952→1992 – constituent republic of the Soviet Union)

Flag of North Korea

Flag of the Latvian SSR
– wavy
(1953→1990 – constituent republic of the Soviet Union)

Flag of the Lithuanian SSR
(1940→1990 – constituent republic of the Soviet Union)

Flag of Suriname
– white fimbriated lines

Flag of the Uzbek SSR
(1952→1992 – constituent republic of the Soviet Union)

Many horizontal bi-colour stripes – equal – with or without a band, a canton, or a pile (triangle) at the hoist
Flag of Abkhazia
– seven stripes
(unrecognized breakaway state from Georgia under military occupation by Russia)

Flag of Catalonia
– nine stripes
(autonomous community of Spain)

Flag of Cuba
– five stripes

Flag of Greece
– nine stripes

Flag of Liberia
– eleven stripes

Flag of Malaysia
– fourteen stripes

Flag of Puerto Rico
– five stripes
(unincorporated organized US territory)

Flag of Togo
– five stripes

Flag of the United States
– thirteen stripes

Flag of Uruguay
– nine stripes

Flag of Valencia ("Senyera")
– nine stripes
(autonomous community of Spain)

Flag of the Republic of West Papua
– thirteen stripes
(proposed nation state and member of UNPO)

Many horizontal bi-colour stripes – unequal
Flag of Aruba
– five stripes
(a constituent island country within the Kingdom of the Netherlands)

Flag of Northern Cyprus
(autonomous self-governing nation state recognized only by Turkey, not recognized by the UN)

Flag of Israel
– five stripes

Flag of the Turkmen SSR
– five stripes
(1953→1992 – constituent republic of the Soviet Union)

Flag of South Vietnam
– seven stripes
(1949→1975)

=== Horizontal tri-colour stripes ===
Three horizontal tri-colour stripes – equal
Flag of Armenia

Flag of the Republic of Artsakh
(1992→2023 – partially recognized autonomous self-governing Armenian enclave of Nagorno-Karabakh in Azerbaijan, not recognized by the UN)

Flag of Azerbaijan

Flag of Bangsamoro
(autonomous region in the Philippines)

Flag of Bolivia

Flag of Bolivia
(government/state flag only – civil flag is without the arms)

Flag of Bulgaria

Flag of Croatia

Flag of Egypt

Flag of Estonia

Flag of Ethiopia

Flag of Gabon

Flag of Germany

Flag of Germany
(government/state flag only – civil flag is without the coat of arms of Germany)

Flag of the German Democratic Republic
(1959→1990 – charge of the national emblem of East Germany)

Flag of the German Empire
(1867→1918)

Flag of Ghana

Flag of Hungary

Flag of India

Flag of Iran

Flag of Iraq

Flag of Kurdistan
(partially recognized autonomous self-governing nation state of Iraq not recognized by the UN)

Flag of Lithuania

Flag of Luxembourg

Flag of Malawi

Flag of Myanmar

Flag of the Netherlands

Flag of New Caledonia
(overseas self-governing collectivity of France to be concurrently displayed with the Tricoleur français)

Flag of Niger

Flag of South Ossetia
(unrecognized breakaway state from Georgia under military occupation by Russia)

Flag of Paraguay

Prinsenvlag of the Netherlands
(historical outlawed 1795 flag of the Dutch Revolt, first used in the late 16th century during the Eighty Years' War based on the colors of William the Silent)

Flag of Russia

Flag of Sierra Leone

Flag of Serbia

Flag of Serbia
(government/state flag only – civil flag is without the arms)

Flag of Slovakia

Flag of Slovenia

Flag of Somaliland
(partially recognized autonomous self-governing nation state not recognized by the UN)

Flag of Syria

Flag of Venezuela

Flag of Yemen

Flag of the Socialist Federal Republic of Yugoslavia
(1946→1992)

Flag of Zanzibar
(semi-autonomous region in Tanzania)

Three horizontal tri-colour stripes – unequal
Flag of Afghanistan
(1974→1978)

Flag of the Chagos Islands
(territory in negotiated transfer process from the UK to Mauritius)

Flag of Colombia

Flag of Crimea
(unrecognized breakaway state from Ukraine under military occupation by Russia)

Flag of Ecuador

Flag of Gagauzia / Gagauz-Yeri
(an Autonomous Territorial Unit of Moldova)

Flag of Lesotho

Flag of Libya

Flag of the Māori people of Aotearoa (New Zealand)
(The national flag of the Māori people or Tino Rangatiratanga flag of the descendants of precolonial native people of New Zealand. It has no official status, but is used by the government on official occasions.)

Flag of Rwanda

Flag of Tajikistan

Three horizontal tri-colour stripes with a band or a pile (triangle) at the hoist
Flag of Equatorial Guinea

Flag of Jordan

Flag of Kuwait

Flag of Mozambique

Flag of Oman

Flag of Palestine

Flag of the Sahrawi Arab Democratic Republic
(partially recognized autonomous self-governing nation state not recognized by the UN)

Flag of the South African Republic "Vierkleur"
(1852→1902)

Flag of South Sudan

Flag of the United Arab Emirates

Three horizontal tri-colour stripes – fimbriated
Flag of Gambia
– white fimbriated lines

Flag of Kenya
– white fimbriated lines

Flag of Uzbekistan
– red fimbriated lines

Many horizontal tri-colour stripes – equal
Flag of Cape Verde
– five stripes

Flag of Costa Rica
– five stripes

Flag of Thailand
– five stripes

Flag of Uganda
– six stripes

=== Horizontal stripes in many colors ===
Four horizontal stripes in four colours – equal
Flag of the Central African Republic

Flag of the Comoros

Flag of Mauritius

Flag of the Druze people of the Levant / Al-Muwaḥḥidūn
(a major Levantine religious and cultural ethnic group, resident across many nations without their own nation state)

Five horizontal stripes in five colours – equal
Flag of China
(1912→1928)

Flag of Manchukuo
(1932→1945 – Manchurian puppet state controlled by Japan)

== Vertical divisions and stripes ==
=== Vertical bi-colour divisions and stripes ===
One vertical bi-colour division – equal
Flag of Algeria

Flag of Malta

Flag of the Vatican City

One vertical bi-colour division – unequal
Flag of Pakistan

Flag of Portugal

Flag of the Russian SFSR
(1954→1991 – constituent federal republic of the Soviet Union)

One vertical bi-colour division – unequal serrated
Flag of Bahrain

Flag of Qatar

Three vertical bi-colour stripes – equal
Flag of Barbados

Flag of Guatemala

Flag of Guatemala
(government/state flag only – civil flag is without the arms)

Flag of Mongolia

Flag of Nigeria

Flag of Peru

Three vertical bi-colour stripes – unequal
Flag of Canada

Flag of Norfolk Island
(Australian external territory)

=== Vertical tri-colour stripes ===
Flag of Andorra
– unequal stripes with a ratio of 8:9:8

Flag of Belgium

Flag of Cameroon

Flag of Chad

Flag of France

Flag of Guinea

Flag of Ireland

Flag of Italy

Flag of Ivory Coast

Flag of Mali

Flag of Mexico

Flag of Moldova

Flag of Romania

Flag of Saint Vincent and the Grenadines
– unequal stripes with a ratio of 1:2:1

Flag of Senegal

Historical
Flag of the Emirate of Afghanistan
(1929)

Flag of the Kingdom of Afghanistan
(1931→1973)

Flag of Afghanistan
(2013→2021)

Flag of the Republic of Alba
(1796)

Flag of Andorra
(1939→1949)

Flag of the State of Cameroon & the Republic of Cameroon
(1957→1961)

Flag of the Federal Republic of Cameroon
(1961→1975)

Flag of the Kingdom of France & the French First Republic
(1791→1794)

Flag of Free France
(1940→1944)

Flag of the Cisalpine Republic
(1798→1802)

Flag of the Republic of San Marco
(1848→1849)

Flag of the Free Cities of Menton and Roquebrune
(1848→1849)

Flag of the Kingdom of the Two Sicilies
(1860→1861)

Flag of the Kingdom of Italy
(1890→1946)

Flag of the Mali Federation & the Republic of Mali
(1959→1961)

Flag of the Socialist Republic of Romania
(1965→1989)

Flag of Rwanda
(1961)

Flag of Rwanda
(1962→2001)

Flag of Saint Vincent and the Grenadines
(1985)

Flag of the Talysh-Mughan Autonomous Republic
(1993)

== Mobile charge – Circle ==
=== One circle in center ===
Flag of Belize

Flag of Brazil

Flag of Burundi

Flag of Christmas Island
(external territory of Australia)

Flag of Dominica

Flag of Ethiopia

Flag of Grenada

Flag of India

Flag of Japan

Flag of South Korea

Flag of Laos

Flag of North Macedonia

Flag of Niger

Flag of Paraguay

Flag of Tunisia

Flag of Uganda

Flag of Zaire
(1971→1997)

=== One circle off-centre ===
Flag of Bangladesh

Flag of Bonaire
(Caribbean Netherlands, overseas territory of the Dutch Crown)

Flag of the Cocos (Keeling) Islands
(unofficial flag of the external territory of Australia – no image: flag design copyright in question)

Flag of Greenland
(overseas autonomous territory of Denmark)

Flag of Kazakhstan

Flag of North Korea

Flag of Namibia

Flag of New Caledonia
(overseas self-governing collectivity of France to be concurrently displayed with the Tricoleur français)

Flag of Palau
(self-governing island nation-state in free association with the US)

Flag of Portugal
– an armillary sphere plus 25 white "plate" roundel discs in quincunces on five escutcheoned shields

Flag of Rwanda

=== One broken or implied circle ===
Flag of Afghanistan
(2013→2021)
– a wreath emblem

Flag of Cape Verde
– ten golden stars in an off-centre circle

Flag of the Cook Islands
– 15 white stars in an off-centre circle
(self-governing island nation-state in free association with New Zealand)

Flag of Eritrea
– a wreath emblem

Flag of the European Union
– twelve golden stars in a circle
(1985→ – supra-national inter-governmental, political, and economic union)

Flag of French Polynesia
– The Seal of French Polynesia
(overseas self-governing collectivity of France to be concurrently displayed with the Tricoleur français)

Flag of the German Democratic Republic
– wreath of wheat emblem
(1959→1990 – East Germany)

Flag of the Northern Mariana Islands
– a garland of flowers emblem
(unincorporated organized US territory)

== Mobile charge – National coat of arms / badge ==
=== National coat of arms / badge – civil / national flags ===
Flag of Alderney
(Crown dependency of the UK under the self-governing Bailiwick of Guernsey)

Flag of Andorra

Flag of Anguilla
(overseas self-governing territory of the UK)

Flag of Ascension Island
(overseas self-governing territory of the UK)

Flag of the Azores
(Autonomous Region of Portugal)

Flag of Belize

Flag of Bermuda
(overseas self-governing territory of the UK)

Flag of the British Virgin Islands
(overseas self-governing territory of the UK)

Flag of the Cayman Islands
(overseas self-governing territory of the UK)

Flag of Croatia

Flag of Ecuador

Flag of Egypt

Flag of Equatorial Guinea

Flag of the Falkland Islands
(overseas self-governing territory of the UK)

Flag of Fiji

Flag of Haiti

Flag of Herm
(Crown dependency of the UK under the self-governing Bailiwick of Guernsey)

Flag of Jersey
(self-governing Crown dependency of the UK)

Flag of the Isle of Man
(self-governing Crown dependency of the UK)

Flag of Mayotte
(unofficial flag of the overseas department of France)

Flag of Moldova

Flag of Montenegro

Flag of Montserrat
(overseas self-governing territory of the UK)

Flag of Nicaragua

Flag of Paraguay

Flag of the Pitcairn Islands
(overseas self-governing territory of the UK)

Flag of Portugal

Flag of Saint-Barthélemy
(unofficial flag of the overseas self-governing collectivity of France to be concurrently displayed with the Tricoleur français)

Flag of Saint Helena
(overseas self-governing territory of the UK)

Flag of the Collectivity of Saint Martin
(unofficial flag of the overseas self-governing collectivity of France to be concurrently displayed with the Tricoleur français)

Flag of Sint Maarten
(constituent island nation of the Kingdom of the Netherlands)

Flag of Saint Pierre and Miquelon
(unofficial flag of the overseas self-governing collectivity of France to be concurrently displayed with the Tricoleur français)

Flag of San Marino
(this is an alternative version of the civil flag that is also the state flag)

Flag of Slovakia

Flag of Slovenia

Flag of South Georgia and the South Sandwich Islands
(overseas self-governing territory of the UK)

Flag of Spain

Flag of Tristan da Cunha
(overseas self-governing territory of the UK)

Flag of the Turks and Caicos Islands
(overseas self-governing territory of the UK)

Flag of the United States Virgin Islands
(unincorporated organized US territory)

=== National coat of arms / badge – state flags only ===
The following are the government / state flag only – the civil flag is without the coat of arms.

Flag of Austria

Flag of Bolivia

Flag of Costa Rica

Flag of the Dominican Republic

Flag of El Salvador

Flag of Finland

Flag of Germany

Flag of Guatemala

Flag of Hungary
(1920→1946 and 1995→ – unofficial flag)

Standard of the Government of Liechtenstein

Flag of Nigeria

Flag of Palestine

Flag of Peru

Flag of Poland

Flag of Serbia

Flag of Venezuela

== Mobile charge – National emblem / seal ==
Flag of Afghanistan
(1980→1987)

Flag of the Islamic Republic of Afghanistan
(2013→2021; remains largely internationally recognized over Taliban rule)

Flag of Brunei

Flag of Canada
– the red Canadian maple leaf

Flag of Cape Verde
(1975→1992)

Flag of Christmas Island
(external territory of Australia)

Flag of Dominica
– the national bird emblem, the sisserou parrot, Amazona imperialis

Flag of Eritrea
– the emblem of Eritrea

Flag of Ethiopia
– the rayed pentagram emblem of Ethiopia

Flag of French Polynesia
– the French Polynesia seal
(overseas self-governing collectivity of France to be concurrently displayed with the Tricoleur français)

Flag of the German Democratic Republic
– the National emblem of East Germany
(1959→1990)

Flag of Gibraltar (overseas territory of the UK)

Flag of Guam
– the seal of Guam, southernmost of the Mariana Islands
(an organized, unincorporated territory of the United States in Micronesia)

Flag of India
– Hindi: Ashoka Chakra ("Ashoka's Wheel"), an emblem of India depicting the Dharmachakra

Flag of Lesotho
– the mokorotlo emblem of a Basotho straw hat

Flag of the Northern Mariana Islands
(unincorporated organized US territory in Micronesia)

Flag of Mexico
– the national golden eagle emblem of Mexico

Flag of Mongolia
– the Soyombo symbol

Flag of New Caledonia
– a flèche faîtière / carved rooftop finial
(overseas self-governing collectivity of France to be concurrently displayed with the Tricoleur français)

Flag of New Caledonia
– Le Tricoleur français defaced with the emblem of New Caledonia
(unofficial variant flag of the overseas self-governing collectivity of France)

Flag of Syria
– the Syrian golden hawk emblem
(1972→1980)

Flag of Uganda
– the national grey crowned crane symbol of Uganda

Flag of the Vatican City
– the papal emblem of the Holy See

Flag of the Republic of Venice / The Banner of Saint Mark the Evangelist
– The emblem with a main charge of the winged Lion of Saint Mark, symbolizing Mark the Evangelist, the patron saint of Venice
(La Serenissima / Stato da Màr – 697→1797)

Flag of Wallis and Futuna
(overseas self-governing collectivity of France)

Flag of Zimbabwe
– the Zimbabwe Bird emblem

== Ordinary / mobile charge – Cross ==
=== Quadrilateral division ===
Flag of Grenada
– four triangles meeting at center

Flag of Panama
– four rectangles meeting at center

=== Upright centred cross ===
Flag of Brittany / "Kroaz Du"
– The Black Cross / Breton: Kroaz Du / French: La Croix Noire is the old flag of Brittany
(historical country of NW France)

Flag of Cornwall
– the Cross of St Pyran / St Perran
(county of the United Kingdom)

Flag of Dominica
– a gamma cross

Flag of the Dominican Republic
– a cross

Flag of the Dominican Republic
– a cross
(government/state flag only – civil flag is without the arms)

Flag of Georgia
– a Cross of Jerusalem

Flag of Madeira
– the Cross of the Order of Christ
(Autonomous Region of Portugal)

Flag of Switzerland
– a Greek cross

Upright centred cross – Saint George's Cross
Flag of Alderney
(Crown dependency of the UK under the self-governing Bailiwick of Guernsey)

Flag of England
(constituent country of the United Kingdom)

Flag of Guernsey
(self-governing Crown dependency of the UK)

Flag of Herm
(Crown dependency of the UK under the self-governing Bailiwick of Guernsey)

Flag of Northern Ireland
(unofficial flag of Northern Ireland based on the Ulster flag – former flag of UK constituent province – not in current use)

Flag of Sark
(Crown dependency of the UK under the self-governing Bailiwick of Guernsey)

Flag of Ulster
(historical flag from 1264 of the Province of Ulster – former flag of UK constituent province – not in current use)

Flag of the United Kingdom
– the Union Jack of superimposed crosses of SS. Andrew, George, and Patrick

Flag of the Kingdom of Great Britain
– superimposed crosses of SS. Andrew and George
(1606→1801 – unofficial "King's Colour" of the "Banner of the Union of the two Crosses of England and Scotland", with the name "Union Jack" coined in the mid-17th century, until officially adopted with the Act of Union 1707)

=== Upright off-centre cross – Nordic Cross ===
Nordic Cross in two colours
Flag of Denmark

Flag of Denmark
(government/state flag only – civil flag is oblong)

Flag of Finland

Flag of Finland
(government/state flag only – civil flag is without the arms)

Flag of the Kalmar Union
(1397→1523 – The United Kingdom of Denmark, Norway, and Sweden)

Flag of Sweden

State of the Teutonic Order
(1230→1466)

Nordic Cross fimbriated in three colours
Flag of Åland
(autonomous region of Finland)

Flag of the Faroe Islands
(overseas autonomous territory of Denmark)

Flag of Iceland

Flag of Iceland
(government/state flag only – civil flag is oblong)

Flag of Norway

Flag of Norway
(government/state flag only – civil flag is oblong)

=== Diagonal cross / saltire crosses of SS. Andrew and Patrick ===
Flag of the Kingdom of Burgundy
– the raguly Cross of Burgundy
(from the 15th century)

Flag of Burundi

Flag of Ireland
(1783→1922 – Saint Patrick's Saltire flag of Ireland – former flag of constituent country of the UK, not in current use)

Flag of Jamaica

Flag of Jersey
(self-governing Crown dependency of the UK)

Flag of Scotland
(Saint Andrew's Saltire flag of constituent semi-autonomous country of the UK)

Flag of the Seychelles
(1976→1977)

Flag of the United Kingdom

Flag of the Kingdom of Great Britain
– superimposed crosses of SS. Andrew and George
(1606→1801 – unofficial "King's Colour" of the "Banner of the Union of the two Crosses of England and Scotland", with the name "Union Jack" coined in the mid-17th century, until officially adopted with the Act of Union 1707)

=== Upright and diagonal centred crosses ===
Flag of the Basque Country
– the ikurrina of superimposed crosses of Guernica and God
(autonomous community of Spain)

Flag of North Macedonia
– the rays of a Vergina Sun variant

Flag of Spain
– golden chains cross-linked in an orle border of the Kingdom of Navarre

Flag of the United Kingdom
– the Union Jack of superimposed crosses of SS. Andrew, George, and Patrick

Flag of the Kingdom of Great Britain
– superimposed crosses of SS. Andrew and George
(1606→1801 – unofficial "King's Colour" of the "Banner of the Union of the two Crosses of England and Scotland", with the name "Union Jack" coined in the mid-17th century, until officially adopted with the Act of Union 1707)

British ensign-derived flag / The Union Jack in the canton
The civil Red Ensign of the British Merchant Navy

The state Blue Ensign of HM Government

The military White Ensign of the Royal Navy

The military Royal Air Force Ensign
Flag of Australia

Flag of Anguilla
(overseas self-governing territory of the UK)

Flag of Ascension Island
(overseas self-governing territory of the UK)

Flag of Bermuda
(overseas self-governing territory of the UK)

Flag of the British Virgin Islands
(overseas self-governing territory of the UK)

Flag of the Cayman Islands
(overseas self-governing territory of the UK)

Flag of the Cook Islands
(self-governing island nation-state in free association with New Zealand)

Flag of the Falkland Islands
(overseas self-governing territory of the UK)

Flag of Fiji

Flag of Montserrat
(overseas self-governing territory of the UK)

Flag of New Zealand

Flag of Niue
(self-governing island nation-state in free association with New Zealand)

Flag of the Pitcairn Islands
(with Henderson, Ducie, and Oeno Islands – overseas self-governing territory of the UK)

Flag of Ross Dependency of Antarctica
(unofficial flag of the overseas territory of New Zealand)

Flag of South Georgia and the South Sandwich Islands
(overseas territory of the UK)

Flag of Saint Helena
(overseas self-governing territory of the UK)

Flag of Tristan da Cunha
(overseas self-governing territory of the UK)

Flag of the Turks and Caicos Islands
(overseas self-governing territory of the UK)

Flag of Tuvalu

Historical flags
Flag of the East India Company
(1600→1707 – The company refused to use the King's Colours of 1606 until the Act of Union (1707))

Flag of the British East India Company
(1707→1801)

Flag of the British East India Company
(1801→1858)

Flag of Canada
(1868→1921)

Flag of Canada
(1921→1957)

Flag of Canada
(1957→1965)

Flag of the Kingdom of Hawaiʻi
– a 1:2 canton and 9 stripes
(1795→1893 – The Sandwich Islands)

Flag of the Republic of Hawaiʻi
– a 1:2 canton and 8 stripes
(1893→1959 – unincorporated unorganized territory of the US)

Flag of South Africa
(1928→1994)

The Continental Union Flag / The First Flag of the United States
(1776→1777)

Notably, the British Union Jack features in many territorial and sub-national flags usually based on the Red Ensign (e.g. Bermuda), or Blue Ensign (e.g. New South Wales). The White Ensign is used in a few cases with backgrounds of other colors (e.g. the British Antarctic Territory and Niue), or a unique pattern in the field (e.g. the British Indian Ocean Territory and Hawaii). Notably, the Royal Air Force Ensign is used as the basis for the Fiji and Tuvalu flags. Some flags use the Union Jack other than at the canton (e.g. British Columbia). Unofficial flags also use it (e.g. the Ross Dependency of Antarctica).

=== Other crosses in the canton or on the charged coat of arms / emblem ===
Flag of Greece
– a Greek cross in the canton

Flag of Malta
– a George Cross, the highest medal for gallantry and valour awarded in 1942 by the British Crown to the nation's people in its defense and repulsion of the Axis powers during the Siege of Malta (World War II), replacing the Cross of Malta emblem.

Flag of Moldova
– a cross in the beak of the eagle supporter of the coat of arms of Moldova

Flag of Montenegro
– a Greek cross on the crown surmounting the coat of arms of Montenegro and on the regal orb and sceptre from the 15th-century House of Crnojević

Flag of Saint Pierre and Miquelon
– the ikurrina of the Basque Country (autonomous community) in the canton
(unofficial flag of the overseas self-governing collectivity of France to be concurrently displayed with the Tricoleur français)

Flag of San Marino
– a Greek cross on the crown surmounting the arms
(on both government/state flag and civil flag with a second civil flag without the arms)

Flag of Serbia
– a Serbian cross with four Cyrillic letters 'S' on the charged coat of arms

Flag of Slovakia
– a patriarchal cross on the charged coat of arms

Flag of Spain
– crosses on the top of each of the three crowns and in the formation of the linked chains of the fourth quarter within the coat of arms

Flag of Tonga
– a Greek cross in the canton

Flag of the Vatican City
– the insignia of a saltire of the crossed keys of Saint Peter or Keys of Heaven surmounted by the papal tiara

Flag of Wallis and Futuna
– a saltire based on a cross patée
(unofficial flag of the overseas self-governing collectivity of France)

Flag of Wallis and Futuna
– a cross patée
(1910→1985 – unofficial flag of the overseas self-governing collectivity of France)

== Mobile charge – Astronomical ==
=== Sun ===
Flag of Antigua and Barbuda
– a golden rayed rising sun

Flag of Bangladesh
– an off-centre red sun disc

Flag of Bolivia
– a yellow rising sun disc on the coat of arms of Bolivia
(government/state flag only – civil flag is without the arms)

Flag of the Republic of China
– a white rayed sun centred in a navy blue canton
(1928→1949 – flag formerly flown in Mainland China, but currently in use on Taiwan from 1949; partially recognized state unrecognized by the UN)

Flag of Costa Rica
– a golden rayed rising sun on the arms
(government/state flag only – civil flag is without the arms)

Flag of El Salvador – a rayed sun eclipsed by a red Phrygian cap on the arms
(government/state flag only – civil flag is without the arms)

Flag of Greenland
– an off-centre red and white midnight sun on the horizon
(autonomous territory of Denmark)

Flag of Guadeloupe
– a golden rayed sun centred on a black field
(unofficial local flag of the overseas department of France to be concurrently displayed with the Tricoleur français)

Flag of Guadeloupe
– a golden rayed sun centred on a red field
(unofficial local variant flag of the overseas department of France to be concurrently displayed with the Tricoleur français)

Flag of Japan
– a red "rising sun" disc centred on a white field

Flag of Jeju Province
– orange rising sun
(island in the Korean Strait – Special Self-Governing Province of South Korea)

Flag of Kazakhstan
– a yellow rayed sun centred above a steppe eagle on an azure skyfield

Flag of Kiribati
– an Otintaai golden rayed rising sun from the middle of the Pacific Ocean below a golden frigatebird

Flag of Kurdistan
– a central golden rayed Kurdish Sun symbolizing the holiday of Newroz, the Kurdish New Year
(partially recognized autonomous self-governing nation state not recognized by the UN)

Flag of Kyrgyzstan
– a central golden rayed sun stylized as a tündük opening of a yurt

Flag of Malawi
– a red rayed setting sun

Flag of Mongolia
– a sun disc in the golden Soyombo symbol on the hoist

Flag of Namibia
– a golden rayed sun

Flag of Nepal
– a white rayed sun on the hoist

Flag of New Caledonia
– an off-centre yellow sun disc eclipsed by a finial
(overseas self-governing collectivity of France to be concurrently displayed with the Tricoleur français)

Flag of Niger
– a central orange sun disc

Flag of the Philippines
– a golden multi-rayed sun on the hoist

Flag of the Collectivity of Saint Martin
– a sun rising from the island below a flying pelican on the coat of arms of the Collectivity of Saint Martin
(unofficial variant flag of the overseas self-governing collectivity of France to be concurrently displayed with the Tricoleur français)

Flag of Sint Maarten
– a sun rising behind a flying pelican above the coat of arms of Sint Maarten
(constituent island nation of the Kingdom of the Netherlands)

Flag of Tibet
– the central sun rising from a snow-capped peak radiating twelve alternating red and navy blue stripes on "the Snow Lion Flag"
(1914→1951 and its use is continued by the Tibetan government-in-exile based in Dharamshala, Himachal Pradesh, India)

Sun – "Sun of May" / "Sun in splendour" (a rayed sun with a face)
Flag of Argentina

Flag of Ecuador
– within the Zodiacal belt in the coat of arms of Ecuador

Flag of Uruguay

Sun – "Vergina Sun" (an ancient Macedonian stylized rayed sun)
Flag of Macedonia (Greece)
(three administrative regions of Greece)

Flag of North Macedonia
(from 1995)

Flag of the Republic of Macedonia
(1992→1995)

=== Moon ===
Full Moon
Flag of Laos
– a white full moon in the center

Flag of Palau
– an off-centre pale yellow full moon
(self-governing island nation-state in free association with the US)

Flag of Zaire
(1971→1997)
– a yellow full moon in the center

Crescent Moon
Flag of Brunei
– an inscribed red crescent moon facing up

Flag of Iran
– four crescents

Flag of the Maldives
– a white crescent moon facing the fly

Flag of Mayotte
– a white crescent moon facing up
(unofficial flag of the overseas department of France)

Flag of Mongolia
– a golden crescent moon facing up

Crescent Moon and Star
Flag of Algeria
– a five-pointed star with a crescent moon facing the fly

Flag of Azerbaijan
– an eight-pointed star with a crescent moon facing the fly

Flag of Bangsamoro
– a seven-pointed star with a crescent moon facing diagonally
(autonomous region in the Philippines)

Flag of Croatia
– crescent moon facing diagonally with a six-pointed star on the left on the coat of arms of Croatia

Flag of Northern Cyprus
– a five-pointed star with a crescent moon facing the fly
(autonomous self-governing nation state recognized only by Turkey, not recognized by the UN)

Flag of Libya
– a five-pointed star with a crescent moon facing the fly

Flag of Malaysia
– a fourteen-pointed star with a crescent moon facing the fly

Flag of Mauritania
– a five-pointed star with a crescent moon facing up

Flag of Moldova
– an eight-pointed star with a crescent moon facing diagonally

Flag of Nepal
– a multi-pointed star with a crescent moon facing up above a twelve-rayed sun

Flag of Pakistan
– a five-pointed star with a crescent moon facing diagonally

Flag of the Sahrawi Arab Democratic Republic
– a five-pointed star with a crescent moon facing the fly
(partially recognized autonomous self-governing nation state of the Western Sahara not recognized by the UN)

Flag of Tunisia
– a five-pointed star with a crescent moon facing the fly

Flag of Türkiye
– a five-pointed star with a crescent moon facing the fly

Crescent Moon and Stars
Flag of the Cocos (Keeling) Islands
– the Southern Cross constellation with a crescent moon facing the fly
(unofficial flag of the external territory of Australia – no image: flag design copyright in question)

Flag of the Comoros
– a vertical line of four stars with a crescent moon facing the fly

Flag of Karakalpakstan
– a quadrilateral of 5 five-pointed stars with a crescent moon facing the fly
(autonomous republic of Uzbekistan)

Flag of Singapore
– a circle of five stars with a crescent moon facing the fly

Flag of Turkmenistan
– a quincunx of five stars with a crescent moon facing diagonally

Flag of Uzbekistan
– a quadrilateral of twelve stars with a crescent moon facing the fly

=== Star ===
Five-pointed star – one star in centre
Flag of Angola
– a gold star with a gear wheel section and a machete

Flag of Burkina Faso
– a gold star

Flag of Cameroon
– a gold star

Flag of Ethiopia
– a radiating gold pentagram star emblem of Ethiopia

Flag of French Guiana
(overseas department of France to be concurrently displayed with the Tricoleur français)

Flag of Ghana
– a black star

Flag of Morocco
– a green pentagram star

Flag of Myanmar
– a white star

Flag of the Northern Mariana Islands
– a white star
(unincorporated organized US territory)

Flag of Paraguay
– a gold star

Flag of Saba
– a gold star
(a constituent 'public body' island of the Caribbean Netherlands within the Kingdom of the Netherlands)

Flag of Senegal
– a green star

Flag of Somalia
– a white star

Flag of Somaliland
– a black star
(partially recognized autonomous self-governing nation state not recognized by the UN)

Flag of Suriname
– a gold star

Flag of Vietnam
– a gold star

Flag of the Socialist Federal Republic of Yugoslavia
– a red star
(1946→1992)

Five-pointed star – an off-centre star
Flag of Cuba

Flag of the Democratic Republic of the Congo

Flag of Djibouti

Flag of East Timor

Flag of Guinea-Bissau

Flag of North Korea

Flag of Mozambique

Flag of Puerto Rico
(unincorporated organized US territory)

Flag of Sint Eustatius
– a gold star
(a constituent 'public body' island of the Caribbean Netherlands within the Kingdom of the Netherlands)

Flag of South Sudan

Flag of Transnistria
(unrecognized breakaway state from Moldova under military occupation by Russia)

Flag of the West Papuan Republic
(proposed nation state and member of UNPO)

Flag of Zimbabwe

Five-pointed star – a star in a canton
Flag of the Central African Republic

Flag of Chile

Flag of Liberia

Flag of Togo

Five-pointed stars – many equal stars
Flag of Abkhazia
– an arc of seven stars
(unrecognized breakaway state from Georgia under military occupation by Russia)

Flag of the Azores
– an arc of nine stars
(Autonomous Region of Portugal)

Flag of Bolivia
– ten stars
(government/state flag only – civil flag is without the arms)

Flag of Bosnia and Herzegovina
– a diagonal of seven full stars and two half-stars

Flag of Costa Rica
– seven stars
(government/state flag only – civil flag is without the arms)

Flag of the French Southern and Antarctic Lands
– a chevron of five stars around the TAAF monogram
(overseas territory of France)

Flag of Gagauzia
– three stars

Flag of Honduras
– a quincunx of five stars

Flag of Hong Kong
– five stars, one on each petal of the orchid tree flower
(special administrative region of China)

Flag of Kosovo
– an arc of six stars
(partially recognized autonomous self-governing nation state inc. all G7 nations and administered by the UN)

Flag of the Federated States of Micronesia
– a lozenge of four stars
(self-governing island nation-state in free association with the US)

Flag of Panama
– two stars

Flag of the Philippines
– three stars around a sun

Flag of Saint Kitts and Nevis
– two stars

Flag of São Tomé and Príncipe
– two stars

Flag of the Solomon Islands
– a quincunx of five stars

Flag of Syria
– a horizontal line of three stars
(1946→1958 and 2024→)

Flag of Syria
– a horizontal line of two stars
(1958→1961 and 1980→2024)

Flag of Syria
– a horizontal line of three stars
(1963→1972)

Flag of Tajikistan
– an arc of seven stars

Flag of Tuvalu
– a constellation of nine stars

Flag of the United States
– a quadrilateral of 50 stars

Flag of Venezuela – an arc of eight stars

Five-pointed stars – many equal stars in circle pattern
Flag of Cape Verde
– ten stars

Flag of the Cook Islands
– 15 stars
(self-governing island nation-state in free association with New Zealand)

Flag of Dominica
– ten stars

Flag of the European Union
– twelve golden stars in a circle
(1985→ – supra-national inter-governmental, political, and economic union)

Five-pointed stars – many unequal stars
Flag of Brazil
– Southern hemisphere starfield of 27 stars including the Southern Cross constellation

Flag of China
– five stars

Flag of Curaçao
– two stars
(a constituent island country within the Kingdom of the Netherlands)

Flag of Grenada
– seven stars

Flag of Macau
– five stars
(special administrative region of China)

Flag of Niue
– five stars
(self-governing island nation-state in free association with New Zealand)

Six-pointed star – one star
Flag of Bonaire
(a constituent 'public body' island of the Caribbean Netherlands within the Kingdom of the Netherlands)

Flag of Israel

Flag of Northern Ireland
(unofficial flag of Northern Ireland based on the Ulster flag – former flag of UK constituent province – not in current use)

Six-pointed star – many equal stars
Flag of Burundi
– a central triangle of three stars

Flag of Croatia
– two stars on the coat of arms of Croatia

Flag of Equatorial Guinea
– an arc of six stars over the coat of arms of Equatorial Guinea

Flag of the Falkland Islands
– a quincunx of five stars on the topsail of the ship on the coat of arms of the Falkland Islands
(overseas territory of the UK)

Flag of Slovenia
– three stars on the coat of arms of Slovenia

One many-pointed star
Flag of Aruba
– four-pointed fimbriated red star
(constituent island country within the Kingdom of the Netherlands)

Flag of Jordan
– seven-pointed star

Flag of the Marshall Islands
– 24-pointed star
(self-governing island nation-state in free association with the US)

Flag of Nauru
– twelve-pointed star

Stars in the pattern of the Southern Cross constellation
The flag of Australia
– the Southern Cross of a small white five-pointed star with 4 white seven-pointed stars and a separate large seven-pointed star

The flag of Brazil
– the Southern Cross constellation with a starfield of 27 white stars

The flag of Christmas Island
– the Southern Cross of 4 equal white seven-pointed stars and a smaller white five-pointed star
(external territory of Australia)

Flag of the Cocos (Keeling) Islands
– the Southern Cross constellation of 4 equal yellow seven-pointed stars and a smaller yellow five-pointed star with a crescent moon facing the fly
(unofficial flag of the external territory of Australia – no image: flag design copyright in question)

The flag of New Zealand
– the Southern Cross of four unequal fimbriated red 5-pointed stars

The flag of Niue
– a stylised Southern Cross of 4 equal yellow five-pointed stars with a fifth larger yellow five-pointed star for Niue itself in the Pacific
(self-governing island country as a free associated state with New Zealand)

The flag of Papua New Guinea
– the Southern Cross of 5 unequal white five-pointed stars

The flag of Samoa
– the Southern Cross of 5 unequal white five-pointed stars

The flag of Tokelau
– the Southern Cross of 4 unequal white five-pointed stars
(overseas dependent territory of New Zealand)

Stars and stripes – stars and alternating stripes
Flag of Abkhazia
(unrecognized breakaway state from Georgia under military occupation by Russia)

Flag of Cuba

Flag of Honduras

Flag of Liberia

Flag of Malaysia

Flag of Puerto Rico
(unincorporated organized US territory)

Flag of São Tomé and Príncipe

Flag of the United States

Flag of the Republic of West Papua
(proposed nation state and member of UNPO)

Stars and stripes – stars and varying stripes
Flag of Aruba
(constituent island country within the Kingdom of the Netherlands)

Flag of Cape Verde

Flag of Chile

Flag of Croatia

Flag of Djibouti

Flag of Gagauzia / Gagauz-Yeri
(an Autonomous Territorial Unit of Moldova)

Flag of Ghana

Flag of Guinea-Bissau

Flag of Jordan

Flag of North Korea

Flag of Myanmar

Flag of Nauru

Flag of the Philippines

Flag of Slovenia

Flag of Somaliland
(partially recognized autonomous self-governing nation state not recognized by the UN)

Flag of South Sudan

Flag of Suriname

Flag of Syria

Flag of Tajikistan

Flag of Venezuela

Flag of Zimbabwe

== Mobile charge – Living organisms ==
=== Human and body parts ===
Flag of Abkhazia
– a hand in the canton
(an unrecognized breakaway state from Georgia under military occupation by Russia)

Flag of Belize
– two agricultural workers

Flag of the British Virgin Islands
– a Vestal Virgin
(an overseas self-governing territory of the UK)

Flag of Brunei
– two hands

Flag of Corsica
– white flag, charged with a Moor's head in black
(a single territorial collectivity of Metropolitan France)

Flag of Herm
– three Benedictine monks
(a Crown dependency of the UK under the self-governing Bailiwick of Guernsey)

Flag of Malta
– St George fighting a dragon

Flag of the Isle of Man
– three conjoined legs as a triskelion
(a self-governing Crown dependency of the UK)

Flag of Montserrat
– a woman
(an overseas self-governing territory of the UK)

Flag of Sicily
– the winged head of Medusa with three ears of wheat protruding from it on three conjoined legs as a triskelion
(autonomous region with special statute of Italy)

Flag of the Republic of Venice / The Banner of Saint Mark the Evangelist
– an extravagantly decorated orle border with insets of the Madonna and Child with six Christian saints interwoven with numerous cherubs and men
(La Serenissima / Stato da Màr – 697→1797)

Flag of Zaire
– a hand holding a flaming torch
(1971→1997)

=== Animals ===
Birds
Flag of Ascension Island
– three sea gulls on the coat of arms
(an overseas self-governing territory of the UK)

Flag of Bolivia
– an Andean condor
(government/state flag only – civil flag is without the arms)

Flag of Christmas Island
– a flying golden bosun
(external territory of Australia)

Flag of Dominica
– a perching sisserou parrot

Flag of Ecuador
– an Andean condor

Flag of Fiji
– a flying white dove of peace

Flag of Guatemala
– a quetzal
(government/state flag only – civil flag is without the arms)

Flag of Kiribati
– a flying golden frigatebird

Flag of Papua New Guinea
– a displaying golden Raggiana bird-of-paradise

Flag of Saint-Barthélemy – two pelicans
(unofficial flag of the overseas department of France to be concurrently displayed with the Tricoleur français)

Flag of Saint Helena
– Saint Helena plover
(overseas self-governing territory of the UK)

Flag of the Collectivity of Saint Martin
– a flying pelican
(unofficial flag of the overseas self-governing collectivity of France to be concurrently displayed with the Tricoleur français)

Flag of Sint Maarten
– a flying pelican
(constituent island nation of the Kingdom of the Netherlands)

Flag of South Georgia and the South Sandwich Islands
– a macaroni penguin as a supporter of the coat of arms
(an overseas territory of the UK)

Flag of Tristan da Cunha
– four albatrosses on the coat of arms
(an overseas territory of the UK)

Flag of Uganda
– a grey crowned crane

Flag of Zimbabwe
– a Zimbabwe Bird

Eagles and hawks
Flag of Afghanistan – the eagle in the emblem of Afghanistan
(1974→1978)

Flag of Albania
– a displayed black double-headed eagle

Flag of American Samoa
– a bald eagle from the seal of the United States
(unincorporated organized US territory)

Flag of Austria
– a displayed great black hawk / black eagle of the coat of arms of Austria
(government/state flag only – civil flag is without the arms)

Flag of Egypt
– a displayed and lowered Eagle of Saladin

Flag of Germany
– a displayed and lowered great black hawk / black eagle of the coat of arms of Germany
(government/state flag only – civil flag is without the arms)

Flag of Kazakhstan
– a steppe eagle in flight

Flag of Mexico
– a Mexican golden eagle eating a snake in the arms

Flag of Moldova
– a displayed and lowered golden eagle in the coat of arms of Moldova

Flag of Montenegro
– the displayed and expanded double-headed eagle supporter of the coat of arms of Montenegro from the 15th-century House of Crnojević

Flag of Poland
– the displayed and expanded crowned white eagle of the coat of arms of Poland
(government/state flag only – civil flag is without the arms)

Flag of Serbia – a displayed and lowered double-headed eagle of the coat of arms of Serbia

Flag of Syria
– the golden hawk emblem of Syria
(1972→1980)

Flag of the United States Virgin Islands
– a displayed and expanded American eagle
(unincorporated organized US territory)

Flag of Zambia
– a copper orange African fish eagle in flight from the coat of arms of Zambia

Lions
Flag of Alderney
– a rampant yellow lion on the coat of arms
(UK Crown dependency under the Bailiwick of Guernsey)

Flag of Bermuda
– a sejant guardant red lion supporter of the coat of arms of Bermuda
(overseas self-governing territory of the UK)

Flag of Croatia
– three crowned lion heads in the arms

Flag of Fiji
– a passant guardant yellow lion on the coat of arms

Flag of Jersey
– three passant guardant golden lions on the coat of arms
(a self-governing crown dependency of the UK)

Flag of Montenegro
– a passant golden lion on the coat of arms of Montenegro from the 15th-century House of Crnojević

Flag of Paraguay
– a sejant lion on the double-sided seal of Paraguay on the reverse side

Flag of Saint Pierre and Miquelon
– two passant guardant golden lions
(unofficial flag of an overseas self-governing collectivity of France to be concurrently displayed with the Tricoleur français)

Flag of Sark
– two passant guardant golden lions on the coat of arms
(UK Crown dependency under the Bailiwick of Guernsey)

Royal Banner of Scotland
– a rampant red lion within a red double border with a motif of alternating heraldic lilies, fleurs-de-lys
(historically, the royal standard of the Kingdom of Scotland)

Flag of South Georgia and the South Sandwich Islands
– a rampant lion on the coat of arms of South Georgia and the South Sandwich Islands
(overseas territory of the UK)

Flag of Spain
– the rampant pale red lion of the Kingdom of León on the coat of arms

Flag of Sri Lanka
– a passant golden lion holding a sword

Flag of Tibet
– two mythological celestial passant snow lions on "the Snow Lion Flag"
(1914→1951 and its use is continued by the Tibetan government-in-exile based in Dharamshala, Himachal Pradesh, India)

Livestock
Flag of Andorra
– two cattle on the coat of arms

Flag of Bolivia
– a llama on the coat of arms
(government/state flag only – civil flag is without the arms)

Flag of Croatia
– a goat in the coat of arms of Croatia

Flag of the Falkland Islands
– a sheep head on the coat of arms
(overseas self-governing territory of the UK)

Flag of Malta
– St George on a horse, fighting a dragon on the George Cross

Flag of Moldova
– an aurochs head on the coat of arms of Moldova

Flag of Vanuatu
– a tusk of a boar surrounding leaves of namele tree from the emblem of Vanuatu on the hoist

Flag of Venezuela
– a horse on the coat of arms of Venezuela
(government/state flag only – civil flag is without the arms)

Other animals
Flag of Anguilla
– three leaping dolphins
(overseas self-governing territory of the UK)

Flag of Ascension Island
– two turtles as supporters
(overseas self-governing territory of the UK)

Flag of Bhutan
– an Oriental dragon

Flag of Croatia
– a marten in the arms

Flag of Herm
– two dolphins
(UK Crown dependency under the Bailiwick of Guernsey)

Flag of Malta
– St George fighting a dragon on the George Cross

Flag of Mayotte
– two seahorses as supporters of the arms
(unofficial flag of the overseas department of France to be concurrently displayed with the Tricoleur français)

Flag of Mexico
– a snake being eaten by an eagle in the arms

Flag of Peru
– a vicuna
(government/state flag only – civil flag is without the arms)

Flag of South Georgia and the South Sandwich Islands
– a reindeer as the crest and an Antarctic fur seal as a supporter of the arms
(overseas territory of the UK)

Flag of Tristan da Cunha
– two Tristan / St Paul rock lobster supporters of the arms
(overseas territory of the UK)

Flag of the Turks and Caicos Islands
– a Caribbean spiny lobster and a queen conch sea mollusk

Flag of Wales
– a red Welsh Dragon
(a semi-autonomous constituent country of the United Kingdom)

Historical flags
Flag of Canada
– lion, fish
(1868→1921)

Flag of Canada
– lion
(1921→1957)

Flag of Canada
– lion
(1957→1965)

Flag of China
– Qing Dynasty dragon
(1862→1889)

Flag of China
– Qing Dynasty dragon
(1889→1912)

Flag of Iran
– lion and sun in various styles
(1848→1979)

Flag of Iran
– lion and sun in various styles
(1848→1979 – government/state flag)

Flag of Laos
– three elephants
(1947→1975)

Flag of Thailand
– elephant
(1855→1916)

Flag of the Republic of Venice / The Banner of Saint Mark the Evangelist
– The emblem with a main charge of the winged Lion of Saint Mark, symbolizing Mark the Evangelist, the patron saint of Venice, a subsidiary charge of the Dove of Peace in the top border, with subsidiary winged lions on the three of the six fringes and twelve golden horses on six extravagantly decorated orle bordered fringes
(La Serenissima / Stato da Màr – 697→1797)

=== Plants ===
Flag of Bolivia
– palm, laurel and olive branches
(government/state flag only
– civil flag is without the arms)

Flag of Canada
– a red Canadian maple leaf

Flag of Chinese Taipei
– a five-petal plum blossoms in red, white, and blue.
(used in international arenas and sporting events due to its controversial political status)

Flag of the Cocos (Keeling) Islands
– palm tree
(unofficial flag of the external territory of Australia – no image: flag design copyright in question)

Flag of Cyprus
– olive branches

Flag of Grenada
– clove of nutmeg

Flag of Eritrea
– olive branch

Flag of Equatorial Guinea
– silk-cotton tree

Flag of Fiji
– sugarcane, coconut palm, and banana

Flag of Guatemala
– a laurel wreath

Flag of Haiti
– royal palm tree

Flag of Hong Kong
– white Hong Kong orchid flower centred on a red background
(special administrative region in China)

The Royal Standard of the Emperor of Japan
– a golden chrysanthemum flower centred on a deep red background

Flag of Lebanon
– a central green Cedar of Lebanon tree

Flag of Macao
– a white lotus flower
(special administrative region in China)

Flag of Mayotte
– two ylang-ylang flowers
(unofficial local variant flag of the overseas department of France to be concurrently displayed with the Tricoleur français)

Flag of Mexico
– cactus

Flag of Norfolk Island
– a Norfolk Island pine
(Australian external territory)

Flag of the Northern Mariana Islands
– a garland of flowers
(unincorporated organized US territory)

Flag of Peru
– Holm oak, palm branch, laurel, Cinchona officinalis
(government/state flag only – civil flag is without the arms)

Flag of Saint-Martin
– flamboyant and coralita flowers
(unofficial local variant flag of an overseas self-governing collectivity of France to be concurrently displayed with the Tricoleur français)

Flag of San Marino
– a wreath of laurel and oak
(on both the government/state flag and civil flag – a variant civil flag is without the arms)

Flag of Spain
– the pomegranate fruit of the Kingdom of Granada (Crown of Castile) on the coat of arms of Spain

Flag of Sri Lanka
– leaves of bodhi tree

Flag of Vanuatu
– cycad fronds of a namele tree surrounded by a tusk of a boar in the emblem on the hoist

Flag of Venezuela
– wheat, laurel, olive branch, and palm on the arms
(government/state flag only – civil flag is without the arms)

Fleurs-de-lys
Flag of Guadeloupe
– three fleurs-de-lys in the chief
(unofficial local variant flag of the overseas department of France to be concurrently displayed with the Tricoleur français)

Flag of Guadeloupe
– three fleurs-de-lys in the chief
(unofficial local variant flag of the overseas department of France to be concurrently displayed with the Tricoleur français)

Flag of Quebec
– four fleurs-de-lys, one in each quarter
(province of Canada)

Flag of Saint-Barthélemy
– three fleurs-de-lys in the chief on the coats of arms
(unofficial local variant flag of the overseas self-governing collectivity of France to be concurrently displayed with the Tricoleur français)

Flag of Saint-Barthélemy
– three fleurs-de-lys in the chief on the coats of arms
(unofficial local variant flag of an overseas self-governing collectivity of France to be concurrently displayed with the Tricoleur français)

Royal Banner of Scotland
– a red double orle border with a motif of alternating heraldic lilies, fleurs-de-lys, around a red rampant lion
(historically, the royal standard of the Kingdom of Scotland)

Flag of Serbia
– two fleurs-de-lys in the base point on the coats of arms

Flag of Spain
– three fleurs-de-lys of the House of Bourbon-Anjou in the central inescutcheon on the coat of arms of Spain

Historical flags
Flag of Bosnia and Herzegovina
– six fleurs-de-lys on the coats of arms
(1992→1998)

Flag of Canada
– maple leaf, thistle, and fleur-de-lys on the coats of arms
(1868→1921)

Flag of Canada
– maple leaf and fleur-de-lys on the coats of arms
(1921→1957)

Flag of Canada
– maple leaf and fleur-de-lys on the coats of arms
(1957→1965)

Flag of the People's Republic of the Congo
– palm leaf wreath in the canton
(1970→1991)

Flag of the Kingdom of France
– golden fleurs-de-lys on a royal blue field
(12th century flag of the Capetian dynasty)

Flag of the Kingdom of France
– 3 golden fleurs-de-lys on a royal blue field
(14th century flag of the Capetian dynasty)

Flag of the Kingdom of France
3 golden fleurs-de-lys on a royal blue field
(1589→1792 and 1815→1848 – The Royal Banner of France of the House of Bourbon)

Royal Standard of the Kingdom of France
3 golden fleurs-de-lys on a royal blue field on the arms with golden fleurs-de-lys on a white field
(1643→1792)

Flag of the German Democratic Republic
– wreath of wheat on the national emblem of East Germany
(1959→1990 – East Germany)

Flag of Burma
– rice plant in the canton
(1974→2010)

== Mobile charge – Other objects ==
=== Building ===
Flag of Afghanistan
– a mosque in the central national emblem of Afghanistan
(2013→2021)

Flag of Bolivia
– a church (Chapel of the Sacred Heart of Jesus) in the central coat of arms of Bolivia
(government/state flag only – civil flag is without the arms)

Flag of Cambodia
– the Temple of Angkor Wat

Flag of Gibraltar
– the castle
on coat of arms of Gibraltar
(an overseas self-governing territory of the UK)

Flag of Kyrgyzstan
– the roof of the traditional Kyrgyz yurt styled as a sun

Flag of Portugal
– seven castles in the bordure of the escutcheon on the off-centre coat of arms

Flag of San Marino
– three castles on the central coat of arms
(government/state flag only – civil flag is without the arms)

Flag of Sint Maarten
– a courthouse in the coat of arms at the hoist
(constituent island nation of the Kingdom of the Netherlands)

Flag of Spain
– the castle of the Kingdom of Castile on the off-centre coat of arms

Flag of the Republic of Venice / The Banner of Saint Mark the Evangelist
– the emblem of the winged Lion of Saint Mark, the patron saint of Venice, spanning three isles with castles
(La Serenissima / Stato da Màr – 697→1797)

=== Headgear ===
Cap / hat
Flag of Bolivia
– a red Phrygian cap in the central coat of arms of Bolivia
(government/state flag only – civil flag is without the arms)

Flag of El Salvador
– a Phrygian cap in the central coat of arms of El Salvador

Flag of Haiti
– a red Phrygian cap on the top of the central coat of arms of Haiti

Flag of Lesotho
– a mokorotlo

Flag of Nicaragua
– a red Phrygian cap in the central coat of arms of Nicaragua

Flag of Paraguay
– a red Phrygian cap in the central coat of arms of Paraguay on the reverse side

Crown / tiara
Flag of Alderney
– a crowned lion in the central coat of arms of Alderney
(UK Crown dependency under the Bailiwick of Guernsey)

Flag of Andorra
– a bishop's mitre in the central coat of arms of Andorra

Flag of Austria
– a crown on the central coat of arms of Austria
(government/state flag only – civil flag is without the arms)

Flag of the Free City of Danzig
– a crown
(1920→1939)

Flag of Liechtenstein
– the "princely hat" (crown) of the Prince of Liechtenstein

Flag of Montenegro
– a crown on the central coat of arms of Montenegro

Flag of San Marino
– a crown on the central coat of arms
(government/state flag only – civil flag is without the arms)

Flag of Serbia
– a crown on the off-centre coat of arms of Serbia

Flag of Spain
– the Spanish Royal Crown on the off-centre coat of arms

Flag of Tajikistan
– a stylized golden crown

Flag of the Vatican City
– the insignia of a saltire of the crossed keys of Saint Peter or Keys of Heaven surmounted by the papal tiara

Flag of the Republic of Venice / The Banner of Saint Mark the Evangelist
– an extravagantly decorated orle border with the Corno ducale Doge's ducal bejeweled hat crowning each of the seven coat of arms of Venice
(La Serenissima / Stato da Màr – 697→1797)

=== Map ===
Flag of Bangladesh
(1971 – flag of the war of independence)

Flag of Christmas Island
(external territory of Australia)

Flag of Cyprus

Flag of Kosovo
(partially recognized autonomous self-governing nation state inc. all G7 nations and administered by the UN)

Flag of the Collectivity of Saint Martin
– a map outline of the territory in green surrounds the pelican's eye
(unofficial flag of the overseas self-governing collectivity of France to be concurrently displayed with the Tricoleur français)

=== Ships ===
Flag of Ascension Island
– a ship as the crest on the coat of arms
(an overseas self-governing territory of the UK)

Flag of Belize
– a square-rigged clipper under full sail on the coat of arms

Flag of Bermuda
– 1593 shipwreck of the Bonadventura, foundering on North Rock, north of the main islands of Bermuda, on the coat of arms
(an overseas self-governing territory of the UK)

Flag of Costa Rica
(government/state flag only – civil flag is without the arms)

Flag of Ecuador
– the Guayas seagoing paddle steamer on the Guayas River in the Pan-Colombian colors with a Rod of Caduceus mast

Flag of the Falkland Islands
– on the coat of arms
(an overseas self-governing territory of the UK)

Flag of French Polynesia
– a twin-hulled Polynesian canoe / catamaran
(overseas self-governing collectivity of France to be concurrently displayed with the Tricoleur français)

Flag of Saint Helena
– on the coat of arms
(an overseas self-governing territory of the UK)

Flag of Saint Pierre and Miquelon
– a golden square-rigged galley under full sail
(unofficial flag of the overseas self-governing collectivity of France to be concurrently displayed with the Tricoleur français)

Flag of Tokelau
– a Tokelauan oceanic canoe
(dependent territory of New Zealand)

Flag of Tristan da Cunha
– ship as the crest and naval crown on the coat of arms
(an overseas self-governing territory of the UK)

=== Tool, instrument, device, or book ===
Flag of American Samoa
– a fly-whisk
(unincorporated organized US territory)

Flag of Angola – half-gear and a machete

Flag of Austria
– broken chain, hammer, and sickle
(government/state flag only – civil flag is without the arms)

Flag of Belize
– axes and a saw

Flag of the Dominican Republic
– a Bible in the coat of arms of the Dominican Republic

Flag of Ecuador
– a fasces (a bound bundle of wooden sticks around an axe), the ancient symbol representative of a state bound to its leader

Flag of Gibraltar
– a key
(an overseas self-governing territory of the UK)

Flag of India
– Ashoka Chakra or a wheel of Dharma

Flag of Montserrat
– a harp
(an overseas self-governing territory of the UK)

Flag of Mozambique
– a book and a hoe

Flag of New Caledonia
– a flèche faîtière / carved rooftop spire or finial
(an overseas self-governing collectivity of France to be concurrently displayed with the Tricoleur français)

Flag of Portugal
– an armillary sphere

Flag of Rapa Nui
– white flag, charged with a centred red Rei Miru, an ornamental Rapa Nui (Easter Island) wearable wood carving
(special territory of Chile)

Flag of Spain
– golden chains cross-linked in an orle border

Flag of Transnistria
– a crossed hammer and sickle emblem
(an unrecognized breakaway state from Moldova under military occupation by Russia)

Flag of Tibet
– three colored jewels aflame representing the three "supreme gems" / the objects of refuge: Buddha, Dharma, and the Sangha with a blue and orange taijitu symbol on "the Snow Lion Flag"
(1914→1951 and its use is continued by the Tibetan government-in-exile based in Dharamshala, Himachal Pradesh, India)

Flag of the Vatican City
– the insignia of a saltire of the two crossed keys of Saint Peter or Keys of Heaven surmounted by the papal tiara

Historical flags
Flag of Burma
– gear wheel
(1974→2010)

Flag of the People's Republic of the Congo
– a hammer and a hoe
(1970→1991)

Flag of the German Democratic Republic
– a hammer and a compass
(1959→1990 – East Germany)

Flag of Laos
– a parasol and stairs
(1947→1975)

Flag of Sikkim
– a wheel of Dharma
(royal state flag from 1877→1975)

Flag of Sikkim
– a wheel of Dharma
(1967→1975)

Flag of the Republic of Venice / The Banner of Saint Mark the Evangelist
– The emblem of the Lion of Saint Mark, the patron saint of Venice, holding an open book displaying Latin text
(La Serenissima / Stato da Màr – 697→1797)

Flag of Zaire
– torch
(1971→1997)

Historical flags – with a crossed hammer and sickle emblem
Flag of the Soviet Union
(1917→1991)

Flag of the Armenian SSR

Flag of the Azerbaijan SSR

Flag of the Byelorussian SSR

Flag of the Estonian SSR

Flag of the Georgian SSR

Flag of the Kazakh SSR

Flag of the Kirghiz SSR

Flag of the Latvian SSR

Flag of the Lithuanian SSR

Flag of the Moldavian SSR

Flag of the Russian SFSR

Flag of the Tajik SSR

Flag of the Turkmen SSR

Flag of the Ukrainian SSR

Flag of the Uzbek SSR

=== Weaponry ===
Flag of American Samoa
– mace / war club
(unincorporated organized US territory)

Flag of Bangsamoro
– a kris sword
(autonomous region of the Philippines)

Flag of Barbados
– trident-head

Flag of Bolivia
– cannon, rifles with bayonets and an axe

Flag of Eswatini
– two assegai spears and a Nguni shield

Flag of Guatemala
– two crossed sabres and two crossed Remington rifles
(government/state flag only – civil flag is without the arms)

Flag of Haiti
– cannon in the central seal

Flag of Iran
– sword
(1848→1979)

Flag of Iran
– sword
(1848→1979 – government/state flag)

Flag of Kenya
– Maasai spears and shield

Flag of Mozambique
– Avtomat Kalashnikova AK-47 assault rifle with a bayonet

Flag of Oman
– two crossed sheathed swords and Khanjar dagger on a belt

Flag of Saudi Arabia
– a sword

Flag of Sri Lanka – a sword

Flag of Venezuela
– a sword, a sabre, and three lances in the coat of arms in the canton
(government/state flag only – civil flag is without the arms)

Flag of the Republic of Venice / The Banner of Saint Mark the Evangelist
– an extravagantly decorated orle border with many sets of armour, cannon, halberds, spears, and other weaponry
(La Serenissima / Stato da Màr – 697→1797)

=== Other symbols ===
State flag of Peru
– two cornucopia
(government/state flag only – civil flag is without the arms)

Flag of Réunion
– a red volcano with the Sun's rays radiating from the apex
(unofficial flag, "Lö Mahavéli", of the overseas department of France)

Flag of South Korea
– a Taegeuk and four black trigrams

State flag of Venezuela
– a cornucopia in the coat of arms in the canton
(government/state flag only – civil flag is without the arms)

Flag of Zaire
– a hand holding a flaming torch
(1971→1997)

== Mobile charge – Text ==
=== Country name ===
Flag of Bolivia
(government/state flag only – civil flag is without the arms)

Flag of California
(the short-lived and unrecognized nation of the "California Republic", preceding California's admission into the United States)

Flag of Costa Rica
(government/state flag only – civil flag is without the arms)

Flag of Egypt
– Arabic: Jumhūriyyat Miṣr al-ʿArabiyyah
("Arab Republic of Egypt")

Flag of the French Southern and Antarctic Lands
– a monogram of the initial letters, 'TAAF', from Terres Australes et Antarctiques Françaises
(overseas territory of France)

Flag of Guam
(unincorporated organized US territory)

Flag of Jeju Province
– in English and in Korean languages
(island in the Korean Strait – Special Self-Governing Province of South Korea)

Flag of Mayotte
(unofficial flag of the overseas department of France)

Flag of Nicaragua

Flag of Rwanda
– the initial letter 'R' for Rwanda
(1962→2001)

Flag of Venezuela
(government/state flag only – civil flag is without the arms)

=== Motto ===
Flag of Afghanistan
– the Shahada (the Muslim creed of: "There is no god but God; Muhammad is the messenger of God"), written in the Thuluth script
(nation state under a government not recognized by the UN)

Flag of Andorra
– Latin: Virtus unita fortior
("United virtue is stronger")

Flag of Saudi Arabia
– the Shahada (the Muslim creed of: "There is no god but God; Muhammad is the messenger of God"), written in the Thuluth script

Flag of the Emirate of Diriyah
(1744→1818)
Flag of the Emirate of Nejd
(1828→1891)
Flag of the Emirate of Riyadh
(1902→1913)
– (enclaves of Arabia under the Ottoman Empire)

Flag of the Emirate of Nejd and Hasa
(1913→1921 – enclave of Arabia under the Ottoman Empire)

Flag of Belize
– Latin: Sub Umbra Floreo
("Under the shade I flourish")

Flag of Brazil
– Portuguese: Ordem e Progresso
("Order and Progress")

Flag of Equatorial Guinea
– Spanish: Unidad, Paz, Justicia
("Unity, Peace, Justice")

Flag of El Salvador
– Spanish: Dios, Union, Libertad
("God, Union, Liberty")

Flag of Iran
– Arabic: اَللَّٰهُ أَكْبَرُ
Allāhu ʾakbar
lit. '"God is the greatest"'
(The Takbīr written in the Kufic script 11 times in each fimbriated strip)

Flag of Iraq
– Arabic: اَللَّٰهُ أَكْبَرُ
Allāhu ʾakbar
lit. '"God is the greatest"'
(The Takbīr written in the Kufic script)

Flag of San Marino
– Latin: Libertas
("Freedom")

Flag of Somaliland
– the Shahada (the Muslim creed of: "There is no god but God; Muhammad is the messenger of God") written in the Thuluth script
(partially recognized autonomous self-governing nation state not recognized by the UN)

Flag of Spain
– Latin: Plus ultra
("Further beyond")

=== Country name and motto ===
Flag of Afghanistan
(2013→2021)
– in calligraphic text at the top is the Shahada, the Takbir written beneath it, the year of 1398 in the Islamic calendar, with the lowest line of text: "Afghanistan" in the Pashto alphabet

Flag of Brunei
– in the Jawi script, the line of text on the crescent: Sentiasa Membuat Kebajikan Dengan Petunjuk Allah
("Always render service with God's guidance")
with the lower line: Brunei Darussalam

Flag of the Dominican Republic
– Spanish: Dios, Patria, Libertad
("God, Homeland, Freedom") the motto above the coat of arms in the center, the name of the country below

Flag of El Salvador
– the name of the country encircles the coat of arms, with the motto inside,
Spanish: Dios, Unión, Libertad
("God, Unity, Freedom")
(government/state flag – civil flag is without the arms)

Flag of Paraguay
– the name of the country encircles the central seal on the obverse, with the motto circling the seal on the reverse,
Spanish: Republica del Paraguay – Paz y Justicia
("The Republic of Paraguay – Peace and Justice")

=== Other texts ===
Flag of the Dominican Republic
– the Bible is opened to the Gospel of John, chapter 8, verse 32:
Spanish: Y la verdad los hará libres
("And the truth shall set you free")

Flag of Guatemala
– Spanish: Libertad 15 de septiembre de 1821
("Freedom" and the date of independence of the former Federal Republic of Central America from Spain)

Flag of Haiti
– French: L'union fait la force
("Union makes strength", differing from the country's official motto: Liberté, égalité, fraternité)

Flag of Malta
– in the canton, "For Gallantry" inscribed on the George Cross, the highest medal for gallantry and valour awarded in 1942 by the British Crown to the nation's people in its defense and repulsion of the Axis powers during the Siege of Malta (World War II), replacing the Cross of Malta emblem.

Flag of the Republic of Venice / The Banner of Saint Mark the Evangelist
– The emblem of the Lion of Saint Mark, the patron saint of Venice, holding an open book displaying text in Latin: Pax tibi, Marce, evangelista meus. [Hic requiescet corpus tuum.] – "Peace be with thee, Mark, my evangelist. [Here thy body will rest.]"
(La Serenissima / Stato da Màr – 697→1797)

== Ordinary charge – Hoist variants ==
=== Vertical band on hoist ===
Flag of Belarus

Flag of Benin

Flag of Guinea-Bissau

Flag of Kazakhstan

Flag of Madagascar

Flag of Oman

Flag of Pakistan

Flag of the Russian SFSR
(1917→1991 – constituent federal republic of the Soviet Union)

Flag of Saudi Arabia
(1744→1818 and 1822→1913)

Flag of the South African Republic
("Vierkleur" – 1852→1902)

Flag of the Republic of Texas
(1839→1845)

Flag of Turkmenistan

Flag of the United Arab Emirates

Flag of the Republic of West Papua
(proposed nation state and member of UNPO)

=== Canton – upper left quarter ===
Flag of Chile

Flag of the Republic of China
(1928→1949 – use restricted only on Taiwan after 1949)

Flag of Greece

Flag of Liberia

Flag of Malaysia

Flag of Samoa

Flag of Togo

Flag of Tonga

Flag of the United States

Flag of Uruguay

Historical flags
Flag of Georgia
(1918→1921)

Flag of the Georgian SSR
(1951→1990 – constituent federal republic of the Soviet Union)

Flag of Georgia
(1990→2004)

Flag of Burma
(1948→1974)

Flag of Burma
(1974→2010)

=== Triangle(s) on hoist – pile ===
Flag of the Bahamas

Flag of the Comoros

Flag of Cuba

Flag of the Czech Republic / Czechia

Flag of Djibouti

Flag of Druze people / Al-Muwaḥḥidūn of the Levant
(a major Levantine religious and cultural group, resident across many nations without their own nation state)

Flag of East Timor

Flag of Eritrea

Flag of Equatorial Guinea

Flag of Guyana

Flag of Jamaica

Flag of Jordan

Flag of Mozambique

Flag of Martinique
(overseas department of France to be concurrently displayed with the Tricoleur français)

Flag of Palestine

Flag of the Philippines

Flag of Puerto Rico
(unincorporated organized US territory)

Flag of the Sahrawi Arab Democratic Republic
(partially recognized autonomous self-governing nation state of the Western Sahara not recognized by the UN)

Flag of São Tomé and Príncipe

Flag of Sint Maarten
(constituent island nation of the Kingdom of the Netherlands)

Flag of South Sudan

Flag of Sudan

Flag of Zimbabwe

=== Triangle(s) on hoist – pall ===
Flag of South Africa

Flag of Vanuatu

== Mobile charge – Chevrons, triangles, and quadrilaterals in the center ==
Flag of American Samoa
– a red fimbriated white isosceles triangle pointing towards hoist
(unincorporated organized US territory)

Flag of Antigua and Barbuda
– an isosceles triangle pointing downwards

Flag of Bosnia and Herzegovina
– a golden right-angled triangle pointing downwards

Flag of Saba
– a white lozenge
(a constituent 'public body' island of the Caribbean Netherlands within the Kingdom of the Netherlands)

Flag of Sint Eustatius
– a red fimbriated white lozenge
(a constituent 'public body' island of the Caribbean Netherlands within the Kingdom of the Netherlands)

Flag of Saint Lucia
– a golden isosceles triangle overlapping a white fimbriated black isosceles triangle (sharing a base, but twice the height), both pointing upwards

Flag of Saint Vincent and the Grenadines
– three lozenges in a close V-formation (chevron)

== See also ==
- Vexillology
- Glossary of vexillology
- Vexillological symbol
- Civil flag
- Ensign (flag)
- Ethnic flag
- Flag families
- Maritime flag
- National flag
- National coat of arms
- National emblem
- National seal
- National symbol
- State flag
- The United Nations
- Unrepresented Nations and Peoples Organization (UNPO)
- Galleries and lists:
  - Armorial of dependent territories
  - Armorial of sovereign states
  - Flags of Europe
  - Gallery of sovereign state flags
  - Gallery of flags of dependent territories
  - Lists of flags
  - List of flags by design
  - List of national flags of sovereign states
  - List of Japanese flags
  - List of United Kingdom flags
  - List of Antarctic flags
  - List of flags by color combination
  - List of sovereign states by date of current flag adoption
  - List of former sovereign states
  - Gallery pages of flags of country subdivisions
