= List of national symbols of the United Kingdom and Crown Dependencies =

This is a list of national symbols used in the United Kingdom. Each of the countries of the United Kingdom; England, Scotland, Wales and (previously in) Northern Ireland, have their own national symbols, with the United Kingdom as a whole using these symbols or some of its own. The Crown Dependencies of Guernsey, Jersey and the Isle of Man, while all three are not part of the United Kingdom, also have their own symbols.

== United Kingdom ==
Name and flag	National personification	National animal(s)	Coat of arms	Motto	Anthem
United Kingdom; Flag of the United Kingdom (Union Flag)	Britannia (Great Britain only)	None (Note: The coat of arms uses the Lion and the Unicorn. While the Lion of England may be misapplied onto the UK as a whole.)	Royal coat of arms of the United Kingdom (as used in Scotland)	None	"God Save the King" Note: "King" is replaced with "Queen" in the lyrics whenever the monarch is female.

== England, Scotland, Wales and Northern Ireland ==
Name and flag	Patron saint	National flower(s)	National animal(s)	Coat of arms	Motto	Anthem
England; Saint George's Cross	St. George	Tudor Rose	"Lion"	Royal arms of England	Dieu et mon droit (French) "God and my right"	"Jerusalem" (Unofficial but widely regarded) (de facto); See also Proposed national anthems of England.
Scotland; Cross of Saint Andrew	St. Andrew	Thistle	"Unicorn"	Royal arms of Scotland	In my defens God me defend (Scots) "In my defence God me defend"	"Flower of Scotland" (de facto); See also Proposed national anthems of Scotland.
Wales; The Red Dragon	St. David	Leek or Daffodil	"Red Dragon"	Royal Badge of Wales		"Hen Wlad Fy Nhadau" (de facto) (Welsh) "Land of my Fathers"
Northern Ireland; None formerly the Ulster Banner (1953–1973) (Note: There has been no official national flag of Northern Ireland since 1973. However, the shown Ulster banner, official flag of the Government of Northern Ireland between 1953–1973, has since been the de facto flag of Northern Ireland, and continued to be used by international sporting organisations. See Northern Ireland flags issue for more information.)	St. Patrick	Flax Flower or Shamrock	Irish elk (giant deer)	None; Former coat of arms of Northern Ireland:	None Former government motto: Quis separabit? (Latin) "Who will separate us?" (de facto)	"Londonderry Air" (de facto)

== Crown Dependencies ==
=== Channel Islands ===
==== Bailiwick of Jersey ====
Name and flag	Patron saint	Traditional animal nickname	Coat of arms	Anthem
Jersey; Flag of Jersey	St. Helier	Crapauds/Jersey Cow	Coat of arms of Jersey	"Beautiful Jersey"

==== Bailiwick of Guernsey ====
Name and flag	Patron saint	National flower	Traditional animal nickname	Coat of arms	Anthem
Guernsey; Flag of Guernsey	St. Samson of Dol	Guernsey Lily	Les ânes	Coat of arms of Guernsey	"Sarnia Cherie"
Sark; Flag of Sark	St. Magloire	–	Corbins	Coat of arms of Sark	"Sarnia Cherie" (Guernsey)
Alderney; Flag of Alderney	St. Anne	–	Lapins	Coat of arms of Alderney	"Sarnia Cherie" (Guernsey)
Herm; Flag of Herm	St. Tugual	–	–	Coat of arms of Herm	"Sarnia Cherie" (Guernsey)

=== Isle of Man ===
Name and flag	Patron saint	National flower(s)	Coat of arms	Motto	Anthem
Isle of Man; Flag of the Isle of Man	St. Maughold	Cushag (popularly) or Fuchsia	Coat of arms of the Isle of Man	Quocunque Jeceris Stabit (Latin)	"O Land of Our Birth"

== See also ==
- Armorial of the United Kingdom
- Crown Dependencies
  - Channel Islands
  - Isle of Man
- Channel Islands § Culture
- List of British anthems
- List of British flags
- List of national animals § United Kingdom
- National symbols of England
- Symbols of Ireland
- National symbols of Scotland
- National symbols of Wales
- List of national flowers
- Pillar box
- Red telephone box
- Symbols of the British Overseas Territories
- United Kingdom
  - England
  - Northern Ireland
  - Scotland
  - Wales
- United Kingdom § Symbols
