= Gallery of flags of dependent territories =

Gallery of territorial flags

This overview contains the flags of dependent territories and other areas of special sovereignty.

== Australia ==
Flag of Christmas Island

Flag of Cocos (Keeling) Islands

Flag of Norfolk Island

== China ==
Flag of Hong Kong

Flag of Macau

== Denmark ==
Flag of the Faroe Islands

Flag of Greenland

== Finland ==
Flag of Åland

== France ==
=== Overseas departments and regions ===
Flag of French Guiana
(unofficial)

Flag of Guadeloupe
(unofficial)

Flag of Mayotte
(unofficial)

Flag of Martinique

Flag of Réunion
(unofficial)

=== Overseas collectivities ===
Flag of French Polynesia

Flag of Saint Barthélemy
(unofficial)

Flag of Saint Pierre and Miquelon
(unofficial)

Flag of Wallis and Futuna
(unofficial)

==== Sui generis collectivity ====
Flag of New Caledonia
(co-official)

=== Overseas territory ===
Flag of the Administrator of the French Southern and Antarctic Lands

== Netherlands ==
=== Constituent countries ===
Flag of Aruba

Flag of Curaçao

Flag of Sint Maarten

=== Special municipalities ===
Flag of Bonaire

Flag of Sint Eustatius

Flag of Saba

== New Zealand ==
=== Dependent territories ===
Flag of Cook Islands

Flag of Niue

Flag of Tokelau

== United Kingdom ==
=== British Overseas Territories ===
Flag of Anguilla

Flag of Bermuda

Flag of the British Antarctic Territory

Flag of the British Virgin Islands

Flag of the Cayman Islands

Flag of the Falkland Islands

Flag of Gibraltar

Flag of Montserrat

Flag of the Pitcairn Islands

Flag of South Georgia and the South Sandwich Islands

Flag of the Turks and Caicos Islands

==== Saint Helena, Ascension and Tristan da Cunha ====
Flag of Saint Helena

Flag of Ascension Island

Flag of Tristan da Cunha

=== Crown Dependencies ===
Flag of Guernsey

Flag of the Isle of Man

Flag of Jersey

== United States ==
Flag of American Samoa

Flag of Guam

Flag of the Northern Mariana Islands

Flag of Puerto Rico

Flag of the U.S. Virgin Islands

== See also ==
- Armorial of dependent territories
- Armorial of sovereign states
- Flags of micronations
- Gallery of sovereign state flags
- List of country subdivision flags
- List of former sovereign states
- Lists of city flags
