= Crosses and saltires =

A cross and a saltire are vexillological styles which consists of two intersecting stripes. A cross consist of a single horizontal band and a single vertical band that cross at right angles over the flag's background field. A saltire, also known as a diagonal cross and a decussate cross, consist of two intersecting diagonal bands that run from corner to corner across a field.

== Flag formats ==
A 2:3 Cross.

A 2:3 Saltire.

== Current flags and Ensigns using Crosses and Saltires ==
=== Sovereign states ===
The flag of Burundi, a charged saltire divided into four sections

The flag of Dominica, a charged cross

The flag of the Dominican Republic, a charged cross divided into four sections

The Flag of Jamaica, a saltire divided into four sections

=== United Kingdom ===
The Flag of United Kingdom (Union Jack), a cross and a saltire

==== Countries ====
The Flag of England (Saint George's Cross), a simple cross

The Flag of Scotland (Saint Andrew's Cross), a simple saltire

==== Crown Dependencies ====
The Flag of Alderney, a charged cross

The Flag of Jersey, a charged saltire

=== United States ===
Flag of Alabama, a charged saltire

Flag of Florida, a charged saltire

=== Jacks ===
Naval jack of Bulgaria

Naval jack of Estonia

Naval jack of Latvia

Naval jack of Russia

=== Cantons ===
Flag of Australia

Australian White Ensign, which has a canton consisting of the Union Flag.

Royal Australian Air Force Ensign, which has a canton consisting of the Union Flag.

Naval ensign of South Africa, which has a canton with the RSA's national flag in it.

Naval ensign of the United Kingdom, which has a canton consisting of the UK's national flag in it.

Civil ensign of the United Kingdom, which has a canton consisting of the UK's national flag in it.

Blue ensign of the United Kingdom, which has a canton consisting of the UK's national flag in it.

== Historical flags ==
Cross of Burgundy flag was introduced to Spain after the marriage of Joanna of Castile to Philip the Handsome.

Naval jack of Georgia from 2004 to 2009

== See also ==
- Vexillology – the study of flags
