= Flag of Saint Martin =

Flag of Saint Martin may refer to:

- Flag of Sint Maarten, a constituent country of the Netherlands in the Caribbean
- Flag of the Collectivity of Saint Martin, an overseas collectivity of France in the Caribbean
