= List of sovereign states by date of current flag adoption =

This is a list of sovereign states by the date on which they adopted their current national flag.

For most of these states, the date of flag adoption is clear, but for others the exact date of flag adoption is unknown or disputed because of design changes. This list defines the year of flag adoption as the year since when the current flag has been used continuously to represent a nation, autonomous region or occupied state. Only countries which are currently sovereign states are listed, although the flag may have been adopted before the countries gained independence. The listed countries may have undergone fundamental regime changes, great geographical changes or even temporarily lost autonomy, or undergone political unions or secessions. If the flag remained in use during such events, its original adoption date is listed. Changes that do not alter the basic design of the flag, like the changes in ratio or color shade, restyling of emblems or inscriptions or the addition or removal of stars, are listed in the last column. The current flag design often evolved over the years (e.g. the flag of the United States) or can be a re-adoption of an earlier, historic flag (e.g. the flag of Libya). The year the current flag design first came into use is listed in the third column.

== List ==
Country	Adoption of current flag design	First use of current flag design	Last change to current flag design
Denmark	1625	1219	1893 (proportions formalized)
Netherlands	1660	1572	1949 (colours standardized)
United Kingdom	1 January 1801	1 January 1801	1 January 1801 (merged with Kingdom of Great Britain and Ireland following the Acts of Union 1800)
Argentina	27 February 1812	1812	2010 (proportions standardized)
Chile	18 October 1817	1817	1912 (the star was kept completely upright)
Peru	25 February 1825	1822	31 March 1950
Uruguay	18 December 1828	1828	1830 (number of stripes reduced and colour changed)
France	1830	15 February 1794 (naval ensign) (Note: The flag has not been in continuous use.)	1976 (colours standardized); current design reintroduced in 1830; current design becoming the default in 2020
Tunisia	1831	20 October 1827 (naval ensign)	1999 (proportions formalized)
Belgium	23 January 1831	1831	1831
Paraguay	1842	1842	15 July 2013 (coat of arms changed: yellow letters on red background replaced with black letters on colorless background, and the blue circle surrounding the star was removed)
Turkey	1844	1793 (as flag of the Ottoman Empire)	1936 (proportions standardized)
Luxembourg	12 June 1845	12 June 1845	12 June 1845
Liberia	24 August 1847	1847	1847
Bolivia	31 October 1851	1851	2004 (coat of arms modified)
Colombia	26 November 1861	1810 (as flag of Gran Colombia)	1949 (official pattern issued, all flags with arms modified)
San Marino	1862	1797	2011 (proportions standardized)
Dominican Republic	6 November 1863	28 February 1844	1908
Andorra	1866	1866	1993 (coat of arms modified)
Japan	27 February 1868	701	13 August 1999 (exact colours specified, sun disc is perfectly centered, and proportions fixed)
Guatemala	17 August 1871	1868	1997
Tonga	4 November 1875	1674 (as English Red Ensign)	1875
Monaco	4 April 1881	1881	1881
South Korea	27 January 1883	1882 (Designed by King Gojong or Pak Yeong-hyo)	2011 (when the exact color shades were last changed from their previous colors [set in 1997]. In 1948 the South Korean national assembly readopted this as the national flag with a modification of the taegeuk. The trigrams were moved into their current place in 1949. The exact dimensions were specified in 1984.)
Switzerland	12 December 1889	1470	1841
Norway	1899	13 July 1821	1899 (removal of Union mark of Sweden and Norway)
Ecuador	31 October 1900	26 September 1860	2009 (modernized)
Australia	1 January 1901	1901	1958 (dimensions officially gazetted)
New Zealand	24 March 1902	1869	2016 (colour shades standardized)
Cuba	20 May 1902	1868 (naval jack of Cuba)	21 April 1906 (blue colors darkened)
Sweden	22 June 1906	1562 (or earlier)	1906 (removal of Union mark of Sweden and Norway)
Costa Rica	27 November 1906	29 September 1848	1998 (changes to coat of arms)
Nicaragua	5 September 1908	1823 (as provincial flag within United States of Central America)	22 August 1971 (coat of arms modified)
Portugal	30 June 1911	1 December 1910	1 December 1910 (replaced the blue-white flag of Kingdom of Portugal following the 5 October 1910 revolution and the overthrow of the monarchy)
El Salvador	17 May 1912	1822 (as provincial flag within Federal Republic of Central America)	17 May 1912 (colours specified, and replaced with its own coat of arms)
Albania	28 November 1912	1443	22 July 2002 (colours standardized)
Morocco	17 November 1915	1915	1915 (the Seal of Solomon is replaced by a green pentagram)
Thailand	28 September 1917	28 September 1917	30 September 2017 (colours standardized)
Austria	1918	1230	14 May 2018
Finland	28 May 1918	1861	1978 (colors darkened)
Estonia	21 November 1918 (Note: Readopted on 7 August 1990)	21 June 1884	2006 (colors standardized)
Ireland	1919 (Note: First flown during the Irish War of Independence)	1848	1848
Germany	3 July 1919	1848 (by the Frankfurt Parliament)	1999 (when the exact colours were specified) (Note: Flown since 1990 following the German reunification)
Poland	1 August 1919	1831	1921 (colors formalized)
Latvia	15 June 1921 (Note: Readopted on 7 February 1990)	1279	1923 (proportions formalized)
Panama	25 March 1925	20 December 1903 (Note: Following the secession of Panama from Colombia)	2017 (upper left star and lower left quadrant changed to dark blue)
Jordan	16 April 1928	1917	1928 (star introduced)
Republic of China	9 December 1928 (Note: Flown in Mainland China until 1949 and has been flown in Taiwan since 1949 following the Chinese Civil War.)	1921 (by the Guangzhou government)	1921
Vatican City	7 June 1929	1808	7 June 2023 (standardization: ribbons under the Papal got yellow fringes; Papal tiara and keys slightly modified)
Liechtenstein	24 June 1937	1764	24 June 1937 (addition of crown)
Lebanon	7 December 1943	1943	21 September 1990 (tree slightly modified)
Iceland	17 June 1944	1918	17 June 1944 (when the exact colours were changed)
Indonesia	17 August 1945	28 October 1928	1945
Vietnam	2 September 1945	23 November 1940	1955 (star edges made sharper) (Note: Flown since 1976 following the Vietnamese unification)
Italy	18 June 1946 (Note: Coat of arms removed following the dissolution of the Italian kingdom in the institutional referendum)	1796 (with Napoleon I)	14 April 2006 (when exact colours were specified; in 1946 the monarch's banner was removed, and the Italian Republic was proclaimed.)
India	24 July 1947	1923	1947 (Gandhian spinning wheel changed to Ashoka Chakra; colours formalized)
Pakistan	14 August 1947	11 August 1947	1947 (Partition of India)
North Korea	10 July 1948	1948	23 March 2026 (ratio changed)
Israel	28 October 1948	1891	1897
Samoa	24 February 1949	1948	1948
People's Republic of China	1 October 1949	27 September 1949	1 January 2021 (colours standardized)
Madagascar	21 October 1958	1958	1958
Guinea	10 November 1958	1958	1958
Central African Republic	1 December 1958	1958	1958
Brunei	29 September 1959	1906	1959 (crest added)
Chad	6 November 1959	1959	1959
Niger	23 November 1959	1959	1958
Ivory Coast	3 December 1959	1959	1959
Togo	27 April 1960	1960	1960
Somalia	1 July 1960	12 October 1954	1954
United States	July 4, 1960	June 14, 1777	1960 (Hawaii admitted to the Union in 1959 added into the 50th star when it became a state)
Gabon	9 August 1960	1959	1960
Cyprus	16 August 1960	1960	24 April 2006 (modification)
Senegal	20 August 1960	1959	1960
Nigeria	1 October 1960	1959	1959
Mali	1 March 1961	4 April 1959	1961 (removal of central stick figure)
Sierra Leone	27 April 1961	1960	1960
Kuwait	7 September 1961	1961	1961
Algeria	3 July 1962	1934	1963 (crescent and star made bigger)
Jamaica	6 August 1962	1962	1962
Trinidad and Tobago	31 August 1962	1962	1962
Uganda	9 October 1962	1962	1962
Nepal	16 December 1962	1743	1962 (modernized; the faces disappeared from the sun and moon)
Malaysia	16 September 1963	26 May 1950 (as flag of Malaya)	16 September 1963 (14-point star and 14 stripes after Sabah, Sarawak and Singapore joined the federation, remains unchanged in 1965 after Singapore was expelled and the addition of Putrajaya and Labuan in the flag)
Kenya	12 December 1963	12 December 1963	12 December 1963
Tanzania	30 June 1964	30 June 1964	30 June 1964 (merged with Tanganyika and Zanzibar)
Malta	21 September 1964	1943	21 September 1964 (background of George Cross changed to white)
Zambia	24 October 1964	1964	1996 (green field changed to a lighter shade)
Canada	February 15, 1965	1965	1965 (replaced with the Union Jack and Canadian Red Ensign)
Gambia	18 February 1965	1965	1965
Maldives	25 July 1965	1926	1965 (removal of striped hoist after Independence)
Singapore	9 August 1965	3 December 1959	3 December 1959
Ghana	28 February 1966	6 March 1957	28 February 1966 (white stripe changed back to original yellow)
Guyana	26 May 1966	26 May 1966	1966
Botswana	30 September 1966	30 September 1966	1966
Barbados	30 November 1966	30 November 1966	1966
Antigua and Barbuda	27 February 1967	1967	1967
Burundi	28 June 1967	1 July 1962	27 September 1982 (ratio changed from 2:3 to 3:5)
Nauru	31 January 1968	1968	1968
Mauritius	12 March 1968	1968	1968
Mexico	16 September 1968	1821 (First Mexican Empire flag)	1968 (coat of arms modified)
Eswatini	6 October 1968	1968	2011 (feathers changed to gray)
Bhutan	1969	1947	1969 (colour of the lower half changed from red to orange)
Sudan	20 May 1970	20 May 1970	20 May 1970 (replaced the tricolor blue-yellow-green flag)
Fiji	10 October 1970	1877	1970 (emblem on flag changed)
Qatar	9 July 1971	1949	9 July 1971 (proportion modified)
United Arab Emirates	2 December 1971	1971	1971
Bangladesh	17 January 1972	26 March 1971	17 January 1972 (removal of country's map)
Sri Lanka	22 May 1972	1948 (as the flag of Ceylon)	1972 (four leaves of the Bo tree were added to the corners of the flag) (Note: The flag originated as the flag of the Kingdom of Kandy (1592–1815), but was discontinued during British colonial rule, and was readopted in 1948 after Independence with few alterations.)
Saudi Arabia	15 March 1973	1932	26 February 1984 (sword slightly changed)
Bahamas	10 July 1973	10 July 1973	1 March 2006 (colours changed to turquoise)
Guinea-Bissau	24 September 1973	24 September 1973	24 September 1973
Grenada	7 February 1974	7 February 1974	7 February 1974
Cameroon	20 May 1975	26 October 1957	20 May 1975 (a yellow star added in the middle)
São Tomé and Príncipe	12 July 1975	12 July 1975	12 July 1975
Papua New Guinea	16 September 1975	1 July 1971	1 July 1971
Niue	15 October 1975	15 October 1975	15 October 1975
Angola	1 November 1975	1 November 1975	1 November 1975
Suriname	25 November 1975	25 November 1975	25 November 1975
Laos	2 December 1975	12 October 1945 (by the Lao Issara government)	2 December 1975 (communist takeover)
Western Sahara	27 February 1976	27 February 1976	27 February 1976
Djibouti	27 June 1977	27 June 1977	1977
Solomon Islands	18 November 1977	18 November 1977	1977
Federated States of Micronesia	30 November 1978	1965 (as Flag of the TTPI which had 6 stars above)	10 May 1979 (two stars removed due to reorganization of the Territory)
Greece	22 December 1978	1822 (naval ensign)	22 December 1978 (land flag abolished)
Saint Lucia	22 February 1979	1 March 1967	2002
Marshall Islands	May 1, 1979	May 1, 1979	1979
Kiribati	12 July 1979	12 July 1979	1979
Cook Islands	4 August 1979	4 August 1979	1979
Equatorial Guinea	21 August 1979	12 October 1968	21 August 1979 (re-adoption of coat of arms due to the collapse of Francisco Nguema regime)
Zimbabwe	18 April 1980	1980	1980
Iran	29 July 1980	7 October 1907	1980 (national emblem added to center of flag and religious script added due to the Islamic Revolution)
Vanuatu	30 July 1980	18 February 1980	1980
Palau	1 January 1981	1981	1981
Belize	21 September 1981	1981	28 August 2019 (standardized)
Spain	5 October 1981	28 May 1785	1981 (coat of arms replaced)
Mozambique	1 May 1983	25 June 1975	1983 (change of emblem on the left side of flag)
Saint Kitts and Nevis	19 September 1983	19 September 1983	1983
Northern Cyprus	7 March 1984	7 March 1984	7 March 1984
Burkina Faso	4 August 1984	1984	1984 (replaced the black-white-red tricolur of the Republic of Upper Volta flag)
Egypt	4 October 1984	23 July 1952 (As Arab Liberation Flag)	1984
Saint Vincent and the Grenadines	12 October 1985	12 October 1985	1985
Haiti	26 February 1986	17 October 1806	26 February 1986 (readoption of the 1859 flag due to the collapse of Duvalier regime)
Palestine	15 November 1988	28 May 1964	1988
Lithuania	16 November 1988	25 April 1918	8 July 2004 (ratio changed); current design reintroduced in 1988
Romania	27 December 1989 (Note: The communist emblem was removed following the Romanian revolution in 1989 that it was cut out with a hole shortly before the execution of the Ceaușescus)	1834	1995 (colours standardized)
Namibia	21 March 1990	2 February 1990	1990
Yemen	22 May 1990	26 September 1962 (as flag of North Yemen with a green star)	1990 (removal of green star) (Note: Flown since 1990 following the Yemeni unification)
Hungary	19 June 1990	1848 (first adopted in 1681)	19 June 1990 (removing the Kádár-coat of arms)
Croatia	25 July 1990	1848	21 December 1990 (redesign of the coat of arms)
Benin	1 August 1990	16 November 1959 (as flag of Dahomey)	1990 (re-adoption of the pre-communist flag)
Armenia	24 August 1990	1 August 1918	1990 (ratio changed)
Dominica	3 November 1990	3 November 1978	3 November 1990 (yellow side of green stars removed, but old design seldom use today)
Moldova	6 November 1990	27 April 1990	26 November 2010 (emblem copied to reverse side)
Bulgaria	27 November 1990	1879	1991 (removal of the state emblem)
South Ossetia	1990	1990	1990
Azerbaijan	5 February 1991	9 November 1918	22 October 2013 (colour shades standardized)
Republic of the Congo	10 June 1991	15 September 1959	1991 (re-adoption of the pre-communist flag)
Slovenia	25 June 1991	1848	1991 (red star was replaced with coat of arms)
Russia	12 August 1991 (Note: De facto restored use, as pre-Soviet flags began widespread across the Soviet republics during the fall of the Soviet Union throughout 1991.)	1696	11 December 1993 (ratio and colours changed)
Transnistria	2 September 1991 (Note: De facto use)	1952	18 July 2000 (officially reintroduced after continuous popular use since 1991; identical to the former flag of the Moldavian SSR)
Uzbekistan	18 November 1991	1991	18 November 1991
Mongolia	12 January 1992	10 July 1945	2011 (colours standardized)
Ukraine	28 January 1992	1848	22 March 1918 (blue shades darkened)
Turkmenistan	19 February 1992	1992	2001 (ratio changed)
Brazil	11 May 1992	19 November 1889	1992 (addition of four stars after Amapá, Rondônia, Roraima and Tocantins became states)
Kazakhstan	4 June 1992	4 June 1992	1992
Abkhazia	23 July 1992	1992	1992
Slovakia	3 September 1992	1848	1992
Cape Verde	22 September 1992	1973	1992
Tajikistan	24 November 1992	1992	1992 (last post-Soviet independent country to adopt the flag based on the colors of the flag of the Tajik SSR)
Czech Republic	1 January 1993	30 March 1920 (as the flag of Czechoslovakia)	1920
Eritrea	24 May 1993	1993	1995 (ratio changed)
Cambodia	30 June 1993	29 October 1948	1993 (readoption of the 1948 flag)
South Africa	27 April 1994	1994	1994 (replaced the apartheid-era flag)
Oman	25 April 1995	7 December 1970	22 May 2004 (middle band to equal size)
Belarus	7 June 1995 (Note: Based on the colors on the flag of the Byelorussian SSR)	25 December 1951	10 February 2012 (colours standardized)
North Macedonia	5 October 1995	5 October 1995	1995 (replaced the 1992 design with a Vergina Sun against resisting pressure on neighboring Greece)
Seychelles	8 January 1996	1996	1996 (replaced the 1977 flag)
Somaliland	14 October 1996	1996	1996
Ethiopia	31 October 1996	11 October 1897	16 May 2009 (larger central disc)
Tuvalu	11 April 1997	1 October 1978	1997 (restoration of 1978 flag)
Bosnia and Herzegovina	4 February 1998	1998	10 August 2001 (updated minor changes)
Philippines	February 12, 1998	June 12, 1898	February 12, 1998 (present definitive shades of blue and red)
Comoros	23 December 2001	2001	2021 (colours standardized)
Rwanda	31 December 2001	25 October 2001	2001 (replaced the previous red-yellow-green design with an "R" flag that had previously associated with the Rwandan genocide)
Bahrain	14 February 2002	1932	2002 (white points reduced to 5)
East Timor	20 May 2002 (Note: First flown on 28 November 1975, but it was largely invaded by Indonesia)	28 November 1975	1975
Georgia	14 January 2004	1124 (design based on the flag of the Kingdom of Georgia; approx. and disputed)	2018 (standardized)
Montenegro	13 July 2004	2004	2004 (first publication)
Serbia	17 August 2004	1835 (by the Principality of Serbia without coat of arms)	2010 (redesign of the coat of arms, exact colours defined)
Democratic Republic of the Congo	20 February 2006	1 July 1963	2006 (return to 1966 design, colours changed to a lighter shade of blue)
Venezuela	12 March 2006	1810	12 March 2006 (addition of a star and removal of coat of arms)
Lesotho	4 October 2006	4 October 2006	4 October 2006 (replaced the 1987 flag)
Iraq	22 January 2008	31 July 1963	22 January 2008 (removal of stars, slight change to script)
Kosovo	17 February 2008	17 February 2008	17 February 2008
Myanmar	21 October 2010	21 October 2010	21 October 2010 (the yellow-green-red tricolor based on the short-lived Japanese puppet state of Burma)
Libya	17 February 2011	24 December 1951	2011 (readoption of the 1951 flag)
South Sudan	9 July 2011	9 July 2005	25 August 2023 (standardized design promoted by the Media Authority)
Malawi	28 May 2012	6 July 1964	2012 (readoption of the 1964 flag)
Mauritania	25 October 2017	25 October 2017	25 October 2017 (improved of the 1957 flag design with the addition of red bands)
Afghanistan	15 August 2021	28 October 1997	15 August 2021 (readoption of 1997 flag following the fall of Kabul)
Kyrgyzstan	26 December 2023	3 March 1992	22 December 2023 (redesign of sun symbol)
Syria	8 December 2024	14 May 1930	13 March 2025 (adoption of a modified version of the 1930 flag first seen in 2006 following the fall of the Assad regime)
Honduras	27 January 2026	16 February 1866	27 January 2026 (change of colours)

== See also ==
- Vexillology
- Vexillological symbol
- Glossary of vexillology
- Civil flag
- Ensign (flag)
- Flag families
- Maritime flag
- National flag
- National coat of arms
- National emblem
- National seal
- National symbol
- State flag
- Galleries and lists:
  - Flags of Europe
  - Gallery of sovereign state flags
  - Gallery of flags of dependent territories
  - Lists of flags
  - List of flags by design
  - List of national flags by design
  - List of national flags of sovereign states
  - List of Japanese flags
  - List of United Kingdom flags
  - List of Antarctic flags
  - List of flags by color combination
  - Gallery pages of flags of country subdivisions

== Works cited ==
- Elsie, Robert (2010). Historical Dictionary of Albania. Lanham, Maryland: Scarecrow Press. ISBN 978-0-8108-7380-3.
