= Flag of Herm =

Herm
- Proportion: 3:5
- Adopted: c. 1953
- Design: White with a red St George's Cross with a banner of the arms of Herm in the canton; between two dolphins argent a bend or bearing three cowled Benedictine monks sable.
- Designed by: William Crampton
- Former flag of Herm
- Use: Historical
- Adopted: c. 1950
- Relinquished: c. 1953
- Design: A dark blue field with the coat of arms of Guernsey in the hoist and the name "HERM ISLAND" in white beneath it.

The flag of Herm is white with a red St George's Cross with a banner of the arms of Herm in the canton; the arms are azure, between two dolphins argent a bend or bearing three cowled Benedictine monks sable. The ratio of the flag is 3:5. It was designed by the British vexillologist William Crampton. The arms of Herm was adopted in 1953. Around 1951 the island used a blue flag with the coat of arms of Guernsey near the hoist.

== See also ==
- List of flags of the United Kingdom
- Symbols of Normandy
- Flag of Guernsey
