= Flag of the Cocos (Keeling) Islands =

Australian territory flag

Cocos (Keeling) Islands
- Use: Civil and state flag
- Proportion: 1:2
- Adopted: 6 April 2004; 22 years ago
- Design: A green field with a palm tree on a gold disc in the canton, a gold crescent in the centre of the flag and a gold Southern Cross in the fly.
- Designed by: Mohammed Minkom

The flag of the Cocos (Keeling) Islands (Cocos Islands Malay: bendera Pulu Kokos (Keeling)) is the flag representing the Cocos (Keeling) Islands, an external territory of Australia. The flag is a green field with symbols such as a palm tree on a gold disc, which represents the islands' tropical flora; a crescent, which represents the Cocos Malays and Islam; and the Southern Cross, which represent Australia and the Southern Hemisphere. The flag mostly uses the national colours of Australia (green and gold).

The flag was designed during a flag designing competition in 2003. The winning submission was designed by teenager Mohammed Minkom. Minkom's design was formally declared on 6 April 2004 by Evan Williams, then–Administrator of the Australian Indian Ocean Territories. Despite its designation as such, the flag's design is not officially recognised by the Australian Government.

== Design and symbolism ==
The flag consists of a green field with a palm tree on a gold disc in the canton, a gold crescent moon in the centre of the flag and a gold Southern Cross in the fly. The palm tree represents the islands' tropical flora; the colours are Australia's national colours; the crescent represents Islam, the religion of the Cocos Malays who make up a majority of the islands' population; and the Southern Cross is a symbol of Australia and the Southern Hemisphere.

== Status ==
Then-teenage Mohammed Minkom competed in a competition in 2003 to design the official flag of the Cocos (Keeling) Islands. He had won the contest and his design of the flag would be adopted by the territory. Minkom's design of the flag was formally declared on 6 April 2004 by then-Administrator of the Australian Indian Ocean Territories Evan Williams. Although it was adopted and regularly used as such, the flag's design is not officially recognised by the Australian Government, alongside the flag of Christmas Island.

== See also ==
- Flags depicting the Southern Cross
- Gallery of flags with crescents
