= Emblem of the Collectivity of Saint Martin =

Coat of arms representing the French overseas collectivity of Saint Martin

- Armiger: Collectivity of Saint Martin
- Adopted: 2010

Various logos and emblems have been used to represent the Collectivity of Saint Martin. The most recent emblem used by the collectivity were adopted in 2010.

The emblem depicts various symbols of Saint Martin like the pelican, flamboyant and coralita flowers, the Border Obelisk, 'slavery walls' (mur des esclaves, made of dry stone), salt, sea, sunrise, mountains, and seashells.

== Other logos and emblems ==
Former coat of arms

One logo used by the territorial council, contains the name "Saint-Martin", with "Caraïbe Française" and "French Caribbean" written in small text below. A blue ribbon depicts the stylized letter "S", while a green ribbon depicts a stylized "M".

Another logo, used by the tax department, depicts a gray outline of the island of Saint Martin with a bird flapping its wing.

The coat of arms which was used before the new emblem competition in 2010 featured palm leaves in front of a sun to symbolize the tropical climate, a pelican symbolizing the fauna of the island, a hibiscus symbolizing the flora, a ship symbolizing the tourism-related boating and the words "Collectivité de Saint Martin" on the top. The commune that existed until 22 February 2007 used similar arms but with the legend "Ville de Saint Martin".

== See also ==
- Flag of Saint Martin
