= Coat of arms of Guernsey =

Regional coat of arms

- Shield: Gules, 3 lions passant guardant Or, langued and armed Azure.

The coat of arms of Guernsey is the official symbol of the Channel Island of Guernsey. It is very similar to the arms of Normandy, Jersey, and England.

== Seal of Guernsey ==
The Seal of Guernsey closely follows the coat of arms; it originates from 1279 when a single seal was provided by Edward I for joint use in Guernsey and Jersey. The seal comprised 3 Luparts, meaning leopards (or lions). By 1304 separate seals were provided for each Bailiwick.

The shape of the sprig or "rameau" on the top of the seal has changed over the centuries. Bailiff Daniel de L'Isle Brock commissioned a replacement seal in 1832, the lions or leopards becoming a caricature of true heraldic beasts. The head of the beasts took on a shape approximating to that of a shield, the mane was virtually non-existent, the body was somewhat extended, and the legs were so thin they could not carry an animal. Bailiff Sir Edgar McCulloch in 1884 reverted to the traditional heraldic representation.

== See also ==
- Flag of Guernsey
- Coat of arms of Jersey
- States of Guernsey
