= Flag of the Collectivity of Saint Martin =

Collectivity of Saint Martin
- Flag of France; Saint Martin is an overseas collectivity of France
- Tricolore
- Use: National flag, civil and state ensign
- Proportion: 2:3
- Adopted: 15 February 1794

The French tricolore is currently the official national flag used in the Collectivity of Saint Martin. While Saint Martin has never had its own official flag, in 2026 the "My Saint-Martin Flag" competition was launched, with official adoption scheduled for December 2026.

== Other flags ==
Another unofficial flag that was used depicted a modern logotype, containing the name "Saint-Martin", with "Caraïbe Française" and "French Caribbean" written in small text below. Also on the flag was a ribbon depicting the letters "S" (in blue) and "M" (in green) for Saint Martin.

== Flag competition ==
In April 2026, the Collectivity of Saint Martin announced its intention to launch a competition, and in August of the same year, it announced that it had organised several workshops as part of a public consultation. These workshops brought together more than 400 people over several weeks to discuss the symbols and colours that could represent the territory. On 11 August 2026, the Collectivity officially launched a competition to create a flag. This flag will be used during cultural, sporting, and political events, and will also represent the pride of both the youth and the diaspora living outside the territory. The competition is open until the end of September, and a new flag is expected to be officially selected by the Collectivity in November 2026. A dedicated website is set up for the occasion.

Unification flag

== See also ==
- Emblem of the Collectivity of Saint Martin
- Flag of Sint Maarten
- Unification of Saint Martin (and its cultural flag)
