= Flag of Saba (island) =

National flag of Saba

Saba
- Use: National flag
- Proportion: 2:3
- Adopted: 6 December 1985; 40 years ago
- Design: Two equal red triangles at the top and two equal blue triangles at the bottom, with a white diamond with yellow star in the middle.
- Designed by: Edmond Daniel Johnson

The flag of Saba (Dutch: vlag van Saba) was adopted on 6 December 1985 (national day of the island). 130 different designs were presented to the commission. The chosen flag was designed by an 18-year-old Saban named Edmond Daniel Johnson.

Saba accepted Dutch sovereignty after 1816 and used the Dutch flag. However, since some islanders considered Saba a "republic", they added a special symbol – a green cabbage — to emphasize their independence, and this symbol was used probably until about the 1920s.

The flag has two equal red triangles at the top and two equal blue triangles at the bottom, with a white diamond with yellow star in the middle. This colour was chosen to symbolise the island's wealth and hope for a good future. The star represents the island; the colours red, white and blue symbolise the link with the Netherlands. Red also symbolises courage, unity and strength; white peace and blue the sea.
