= Flag of Bonaire =

Regional flag

Bonaire
- Use: National flag
- Proportion: 2∶3
- Adopted: 11 December 1981; 44 years ago
- Design: A large blue triangle and a smaller yellow triangle, separated by a white strip containing a black compass and a red six-pointed star.

The flag of Bonaire, adopted on 11 December 1981, represents the Dutch island in the Caribbean Netherlands. Bonaire commemorates Flag Day on September 6 annually, the traditional date Europeans first arrived on the island. The professional vexillologist Whitney Smith was involved in developing Bonaire's flag.

The flag has a large dark blue band in the lower right corner and a smaller yellow band in the upper left corner. The dark blue and yellow bands represent the sea and sun respectively while the dividing white strip represents the sky. The yellow band was formerly red as a reference to the Dutch flag, but was changed at some point to avoid having two separated sections of red (from the star). The coloured bands are separated by a white strip, inside of which is a black compass and a red six-pointed star.

The black compass represents the population of Bonaire as a seafaring people, and the arrows adjusting it symbolises equality in the four cardinal directions of the compass. The red six-pointed star represents the original six villages of Bonaire: Antriol, Nikiboko, Nort Saliña, Playa, Rincon and Tera Korá.

== See also ==
- Flag of the Netherlands Antilles
