= Flag of Alderney =

Flag of Alderney

Government Ensign of Alderney

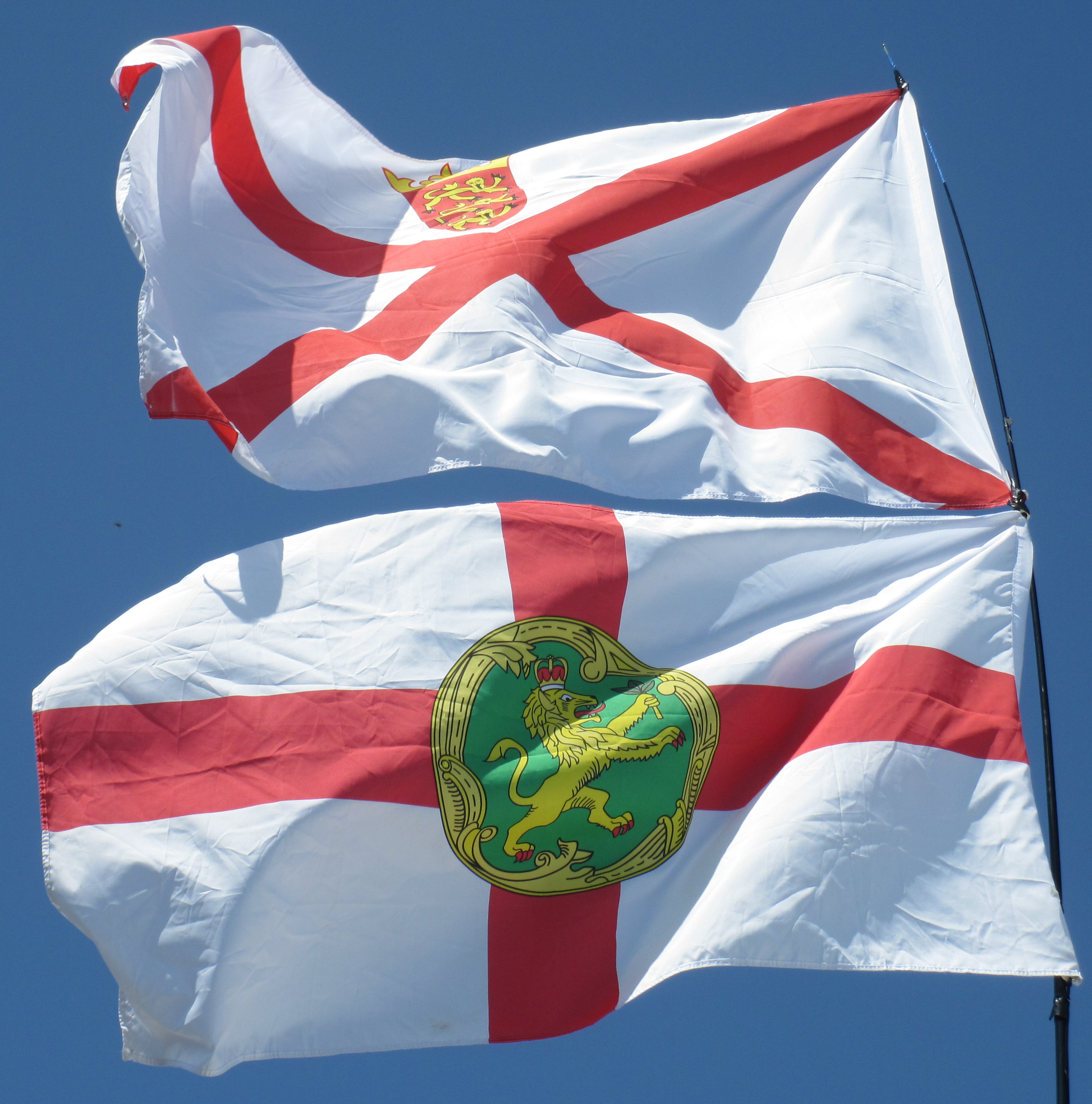
Flag of Jersey and Flag of Alderney

The flag of Alderney, like the flags of other dependencies of Guernsey, uses the St George's Cross. The island's coat of arms, granted on 20 December 1993, appears at its centre. The badge has a lion bearing a sprig of three leaves in his right paw, on a green disc with a golden border.

== See also ==
- Flag of Guernsey
- List of flags of the United Kingdom
