= Flag of Christmas Island =

Australian territorial flag

Christmas Island
- Use: Civil and state flag
- Proportion: 1:2
- Adopted: 26 January 2002; 24 years ago
- Design: Blue and green diagonal bicolour charged with a southern cross of four seven-pointed white stars and one smaller five-pointed white star on the blue half, a golden bosun bird in gold on the green half, and a gold circle in the centre containing the shape of the island in green
- Designed by: Tony Couch

The flag of Christmas Island was adopted on 26 January 2002. It was unofficially adopted in 1986 after being chosen the winner in a competition for a flag for the territory. It was designed by Tony Couch of Sydney, Australia.

== Design ==
The flag of Christmas Island consists of a green and blue background, split from the top left corner to the bottom right. These colours are intended to represent the land and sea respectively. The Southern Cross constellation appears in the bottom left of the flag similar to the flag of Australia. In the top right, the golden bosun bird (Phaethon lepturus fulvus, one of six subspecies of the white-tailed tropicbird) appears. It is considered to be a symbol of the Island. The last motif appears in the centre of the flag on a golden disc is the map of the island in green. The disc itself was originally included to distinguish the green colour of the map, but has become linked to the mining industry.

== History ==
=== Creation ===
In 1986, the Christmas Island Assembly announced a competition to design both a flag and a coat of arms for the territory. There was a prize fund of $100, and some 69 entries were submitted. The winning submission was created by Tony Couch, a resident of Sydney who had previously worked on Christmas Island. The new flag was announced on 14 April 1986, by the Christmas Island Assembly.

=== Implementation ===
The first attempt to make the flag official occurred in 1995 when the Minister of the Islands at the time took the view that implementation could take place on Australia Day 1996 via a formal announcement by the Administrator rather than an amendment to the Christmas Island Act 1958. Although this was agreed, the declaration never took place.

Subsequently, Christmas Island official Gary Dunt revived the issue in 2001. The website of the Shire of Christmas island in 2013 claimed that the administrator of the territory, Bill Taylor, officially declared the flag official on 26 January 2002. Councillor Mariam Kawi accepted the flag as a representative of the Shire of Christmas Island. However, the Australian Government as of 2025 states that the flag is "used in the community but [has] not been formally adopted".
