= Coat of arms of Jersey =

National coat of arms of the Bailiwick of Jersey

- Armiger: Charles III, Duke of Normandy
- Adopted: 1907
- Shield: Gules three lions passant guardant in pale Or armed and langued Azure

The coat of arms of Jersey is the heraldic device consisting of a shield charged with three gold lions on a red field. Utilised unofficially before the 20th century, its status as the coat of arms of the Bailiwick of Jersey was formalized in 1907. The escutcheon is featured on the flag of the dependency.

== History ==
The Channel Islands were part of the Duchy of Normandy until 1204, when the Kingdom of England lost sovereignty over the duchy but retained control of the islands. These were subsequently split into the bailiwicks of Guernsey and Jersey later that century. They have been governed by the English Crown ever since, save for five years during World War II.

The widespread usage of the royal arms of England on the islands led many residents to consider the arms a symbol of Jersey. The claimed usage by the island of the arms was sanctioned by Edward VII in 1907. During the German occupation in the Second World War, the dependency was allowed to print its own postage stamps for the first time given its inability to access supplies from mainland Britain. However, it was barred from utilising the image of the monarch or any reference of Jersey's connection to the United Kingdom. One inhabitant, N. V. L. Rybot, suggested employing the island's coat of arms instead. This design was approved – with the Germans apparently unaware that it was also the royal arms of the monarch – and the stamps were first issued on 1 April 1941.

A Royal Warrant was issued on 10 December 1980, appending the coat of arms to the flag of the dependency and topping it with a Plantagenet crown. This was approved by the States Assembly on 7 April of the following year:

Jersey Flag

The Bailiff informed the House that H. M. Queen had now approved the new design of the Jersey Flag in accordance with the request of the House. The official description of the new flag was as follows –

"Argent a Saltire Gules in the honour point an Escutcheon also Gules thereon three Lions passant guardant Or (being the Royal Arms as used and borne by Our Island of Jersey) ensigned by an Ancient Crown (such as has been attributed unto Our Royal Predecessors being of the House of Plantagenet) of Gold"

The new flag was operative from now but the Bailiff added that it was not an Ensign and should not therefore be worn on the ensign staff of Jersey yachts which would continue to use the Red Ensign or Blue or White in the case of members of certain yacht clubs.

— Minutes of the States Assembly, 7 April 1981

== Design ==
=== Symbolism ===
The colours and objects on the coat of arms carry cultural, political, and regional meanings. The three gold lions (lions passant guardant) are identical to the royal arms of England. Coupled with the dynastic crown on the flag, this represents the loyalty of the people of Jersey to the House of Plantagenet.

=== Uses ===
The shield from the arms features on the flag of Jersey, and on the flag of the dependency's lieutenant governor. It was added to the former in 1980, in order to distinguish the banner from Saint Patrick's Saltire.

== See also ==
- Flag of Jersey
- List of coats of arms of the United Kingdom and dependencies
