= Flag of Guernsey =

British crown dependency flag

Guernsey
- Use: Civil and state flag
- Proportion: 2:3
- Adopted: 30 April 1985
- Design: A red cross of St George, which reflects the island's constitutional relationship with the English Crown, and a gold cross shown on the banner of William the Conqueror which represents the historic connection with the Duchy of Normandy.
- Designed by: Herbert Pitt
- Civil ensign of Guernsey
- Government ensign of Guernsey
- Flag of the governor of Guernsey

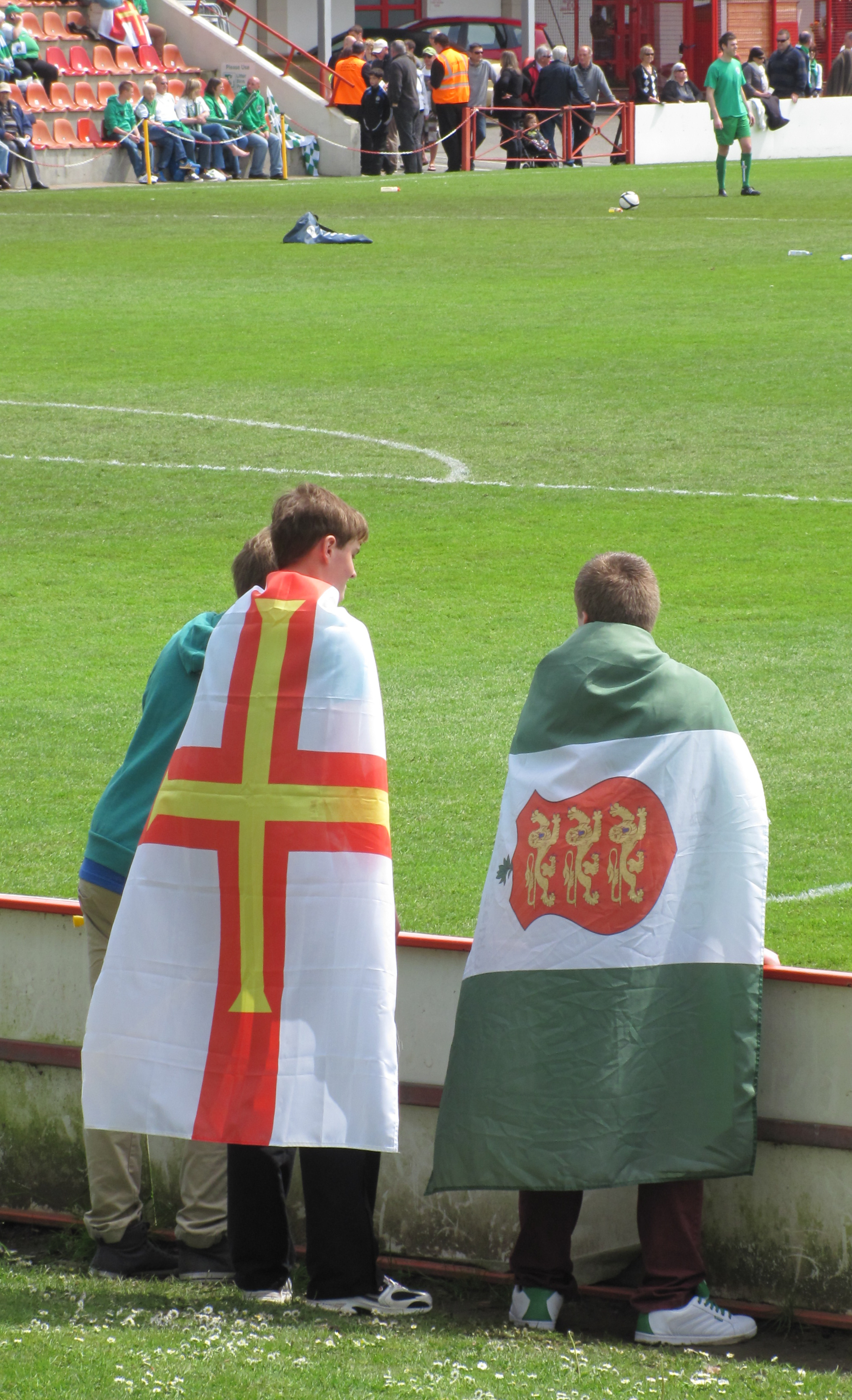
Fans of the Guernsey national football team wearing the official and unofficial flags at a Muratti Vase game

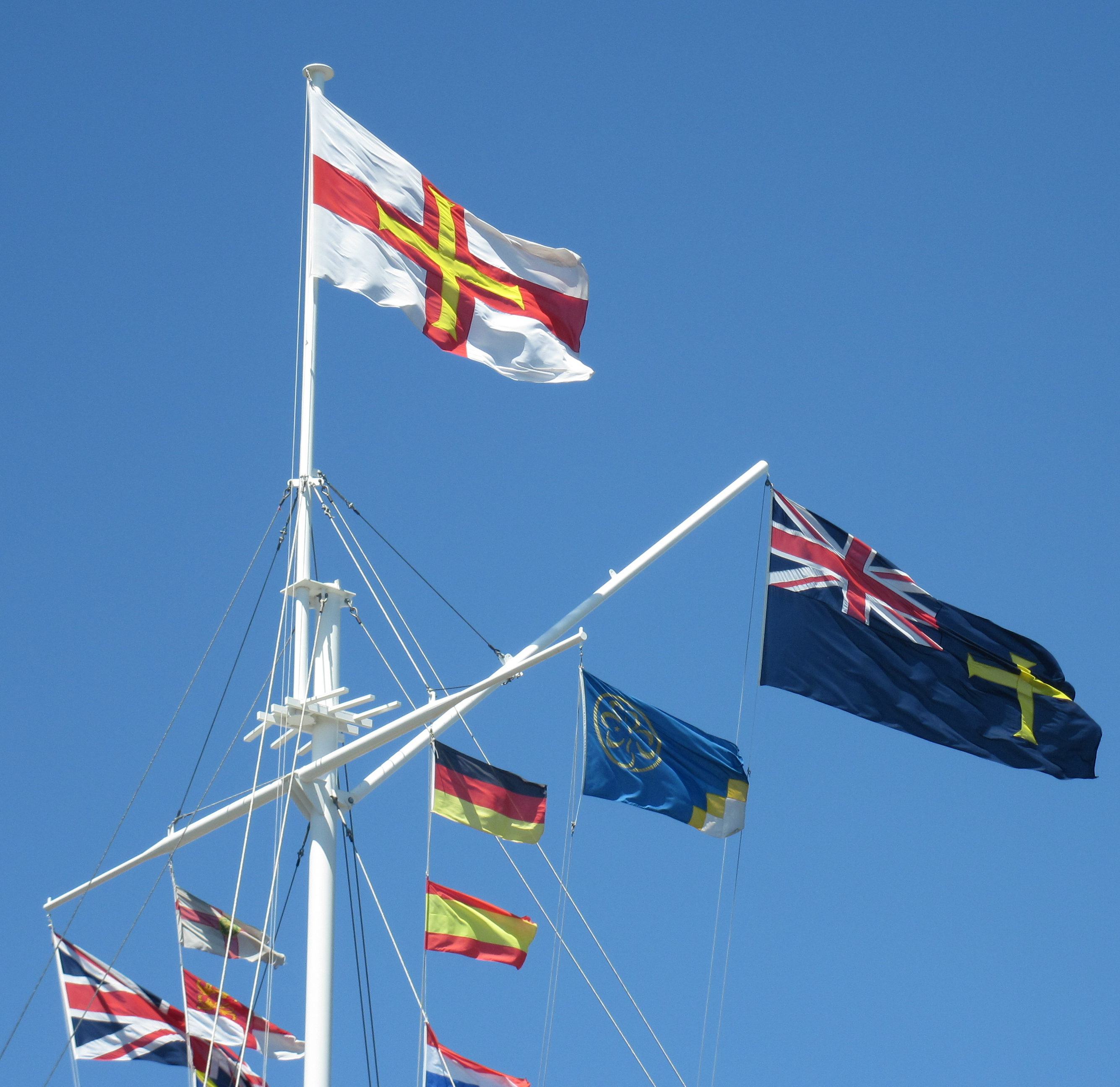
Guernsey flag and state ensign

The flag of Guernsey was adopted in 1985 and consists of the red Saint George's Cross with an additional gold Norman cross within it. The creation was prompted by confusion at international sporting events over competitors from Guernsey and England using the same flag. It was designed by the Guernsey Flag Investigation Committee led by Deputy Bailiff Sir Graham Dorey. The flag was first unveiled on the island on 15 February 1985. The gold cross represents William the Bastard, Duke of Normandy (who became, after the Norman Conquest, William I of England). William purportedly was given such a cross by Pope Alexander II and flew it on his standard in the Battle of Hastings. Since 2000, a Red Ensign with the cross in the fly has been used as the government's civil ensign and as a Blue Ensign.

== History ==
Prior to 1985, Guernsey had no official unique flag and instead used the St George's Cross (the flag of England) as its flag when one was officially required. This came about after King Edward VIII granted consent for Guernsey to use the flag of England in 1936. During the German occupation of the Channel Islands, the residents were prevented from displaying official British symbols, but the flag of England was permitted for civilian use. The Government of Guernsey carried out official studies in 1906 and 1935 to determine any unique and identifiable historical flags that Guernsey could use to represent it. In 1983, the Bailiff of Guernsey argued the need for a new flag for Guernsey because of the confusion caused by using the flag of England. The impetus for the flag's creation was confusion at the 1982 Commonwealth Games, where Guernsey competed under the flag of England – some other nations' competitors erroneously believed England was entering two teams into the Games.

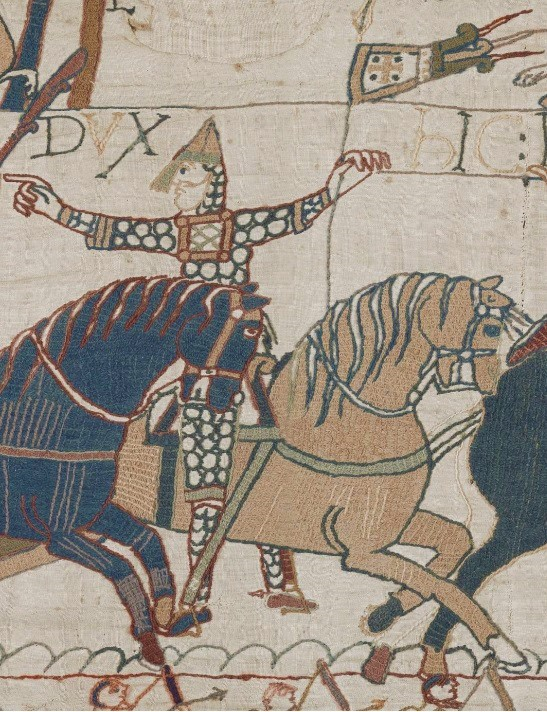
Cross of William the Conqueror on the Bayeux Tapestry, source of inspiration for the flag of Guernsey

Research was carried out by Deputy Bailiff Sir Graham Dorey, of Guernsey's Flag Investigation Committee. The committee considered a number of designs. It was initially considered that the new flag for Guernsey should contain green, but it was ruled that the colour green has no historical basis in Guernsey aside of being used as a sporting colour by the Guernsey national football team in Muratti matches. Consideration was given to using the coat of arms of Guernsey on a St George's Cross but this was rejected on the grounds that the arms would be unidentifiable at a distance. It was also decided that to do so would be to focus on English symbols, not recognising Guernsey's independence or Norman history. The committee eventually settled on including a gold cross on top of the St George's Cross. The gold cross was chosen as it was a symbol of King William the Conqueror, seen on a banner at the Battle of Hastings, as portrayed on the Bayeux Tapestry. That banner was purportedly given to William by Pope Alexander II as a symbol of his blessing for the Norman Conquest of England along with a request for the clergy of the Church of England to give way to William. The new flag's design was to symbolise that the islanders were of Norman descent but loyal to the English (and later British) Crown. In 1985 Queen Elizabeth II, Duke of Normandy, granted a Royal Warrant for the flag to become the official flag of Guernsey. Unveiled on 15 February 1985, the flag was flown for the first time on Liberation Day on 9 May, the 40th anniversary of the Channel Islands' liberation from German occupation during the Second World War.

Thereafter, the Guernsey flag was used in the Grosse Rocque ceremony, replacing the Union Jack, which had traditionally been raised on Grosse Rocque every August bank holiday. The flag would then fly on the rock continuously for a year before being replaced with a new one. The flag of Guernsey is flown from all of the States of Guernsey buildings except on designated flag-flying days, when the Union Jack is used instead. These days mostly relate to birthdays and anniversaries of senior members of the Royal Family as well as Commonwealth Day and Remembrance Sunday. The flag is also flown on the anniversary of the Battle of Hastings on all public buildings.

The flag provided inspiration for the flag of Alderney in 1993. It has also inspired other symbols. In 2011, the Guernsey Ambulance and Rescue Service adopted a new logo comprising the Cross of St George and gold Norman cross, but defaced by the Maltese Cross of the Venerable Order of Saint John based on the Guernsey flag. In November 2012 the Bailiwick of Guernsey's St John Ambulance was elevated to a Commandery within the Order dependent on the Priory of England and the Islands in a church service which included granting a new flag from the British College of Arms including elements of the flag of Guernsey.

The flag is not universally supported. Some Guernsey sports fans complain that the flag lacks Guernsey's sporting colour of green or the crest of Guernsey. In the 2000s, a green and white tribar with the coat of arms of Guernsey in the centre was created by Guernsey sports fans to be used as Guernsey's unofficial sporting flag.

== Guernsey ensign ==
At the same time as the flag of Guernsey was adopted, the Royal Warrant also provided for creation of a Guernsey civil ensign. This was created as a British Red Ensign incorporating the Guernsey gold cross. That was created for Guernsey residents and British subjects as an alternative flag of Guernsey as well as to be used as Guernsey's merchant ensign. In 2000, the States of Guernsey adopted a Blue Ensign version of the Guernsey ensign for maritime usage on government vessels.

== Gallery of historical flags ==
The previous flag of Guernsey was the St George's Cross, which Guernsey was permitted to use in 1936 for its state flag. However, there is evidence to suggest the existence of an even earlier Guernsey flag, used in the mid-19th century. This was a St George's cross on a blue-and-white chequered field, with the Union Flag in canton. Further details of its use and official status remain doubtful, however.

1936–1985 flag

19th century flag

Unofficial sporting flag of Guernsey

== Parish flags ==
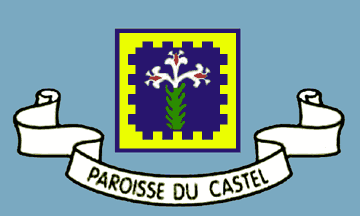
Flag of Castel

Flag of Forest

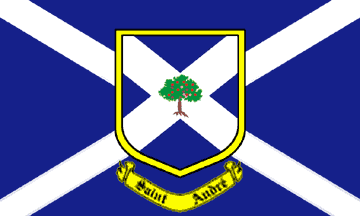
Flag of Saint Andrew

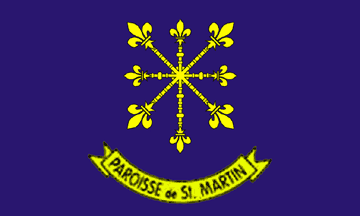
Flag of Saint Martin

Flag of Saint Peter Port

Flag of Saint Pierre du Bois

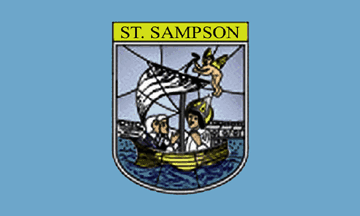
Flag of Saint Sampson

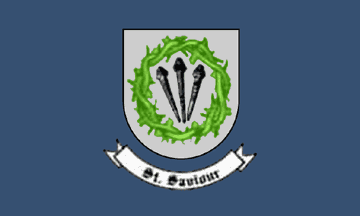
Flag of Saint Saviour

Flag of Torteval

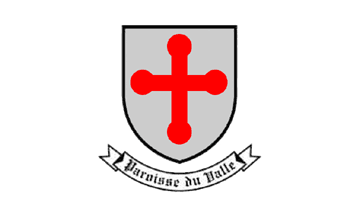
Flag of Vale

== Other flags ==
Flag of Lihou

== See also ==
- Flag of Jersey
- List of flags of the United Kingdom
