= Flag of Jersey =

Bailiwick of Jersey
- Use: Civil and state flag
- Proportion: 3:5
- Adopted: 7 April 1981; 45 years ago
- Design: A red saltire on a white field, surmounted by a yellow Plantagenet crown, and the badge of Jersey.

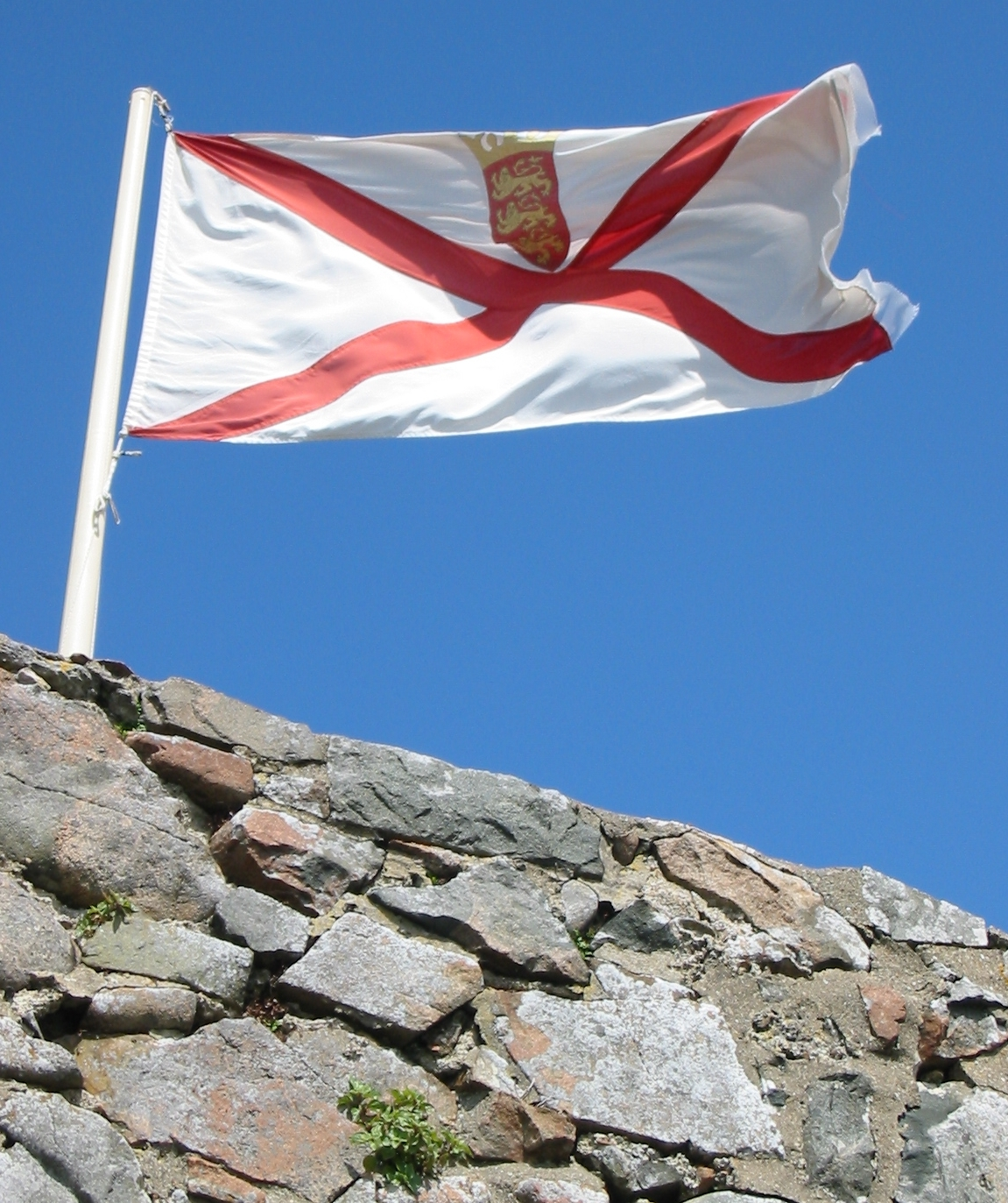
The flag at Elizabeth Castle

Flag of the lieutenant governor of Jersey

The flag of Jersey is composed of a red saltire on a white field. In the upper quadrant the badge of Jersey surmounted by a yellow "Plantagenet crown". The flag was adopted by the States of Jersey on 12 June 1979, proclaimed by Queen Elizabeth II on 10 December 1980 and first officially hoisted on 7 April 1981.

== Status and protocol ==
The Jersey storm flag, designed in 2010, which is intended to be flown from the island's flagpoles when the standard Jersey flag is not being flown. Its design makes it suitable for withstanding stormy weather, effectively enabling it to be flown all year round, except for official flag days when the standard Jersey flag should be raised.

The flag of Jersey has been decreed by the Sovereign for use in the Bailiwick of Jersey as the Island's flag. The Union Flag may also be flown, but precedence should be given to the flag of Jersey. The Bailiff of Jersey requests the flying of the flag of Jersey on government buildings on a list of official flag days when flags are flown from the seat of the judiciary and legislature; individuals are encouraged, but not obliged, to observe official flag days also.

The pre-1981 flag of Jersey continues to be used as part of the re-enactment ceremonies of Liberation Day on 9 May.

== History ==
Flag of Jersey before 1981. Flag ratio: 3:5

The current flag is the first to be adopted officially. Unofficially, a plain red saltire had been used since at least the 1830s. The official flag adds the badge and crown to this.

=== Plain saltire ===
The origins of the association to Jersey of the red saltire are unknown.

A 1906 letter by the Bailiff of Jersey, describing the flag as "the red St Andrew's cross on white ground", states it was used to signal the neutrality of the Channel Islands during wars between England and France. A 1483 papal bull guaranteed the islands' neutrality during the Hundred Years' War. The saltire may have been a variation of the St George's Cross.

Links to the St Patrick's Cross have been proposed. The St Patrick's Cross is commonly identified with the arms of the FitzGeralds, a Cambro-Norman family which became powerful in Ireland, and who also owned land in Jersey. N. V. L. Rybot in 1951 suggested that Jersey's flag originated from a mistake in a 1783 flag book by Carington Bowles, which was copied by later authors. Rybot's theory is that Bowles misinterpreted Ierse (Dutch for "Irish") as meaning "Jersey" in a Dutch flag-book he used as a source. However, French Admiralty charts show that Jersey was using the red saltire before 1783. In his History of Jersey, Balleine suggests that the saltire had in fact referred to Jersey, and that some had interpreted the flag to mean Ireland. At that date, Ireland would have been written Iersche, and the book contains a different entry for Irlandois. The flag was attributed to Iersé in 1757 by French charts.

The use of the red saltire became more common during the German Occupation of World War II, as the local population were not allowed to display the Union Flag in occupied territory. Although the heraldic symbols of Jersey were used by the Island's government during this time, all public buildings and landmarks (such as Fort Regent and Mont Orgueil) flew the Flag of Nazi Germany.

=== Addition of the badge ===
The move to a new flag was begun in 1977 with Queen Elizabeth's Silver Jubilee. It was felt by many in Jersey that the flag was insufficiently distinctive to represent the island, that there was too much confusion with the cross of St. Patrick as an Irish symbol, and that the red saltire had been taken as one of the international maritime signal flags.

Others, though, wanted to keep the traditional red saltire that had been used since time immemorial. A third influential body of opinion campaigned for the adoption of a banner of the three leopards (leopard being the heraldic term for a lion passant guardant), the island's heraldic device. The current flag can, therefore, be seen as a compromise between the various strands of opinion. Although the flag is flown in Jersey, the three leopards are much more widely used as a national symbol by the authorities and civil population alike.

== Ensigns ==
Jersey Red Ensign, Civil Ensign since 2010

Government Blue Ensign since 1907

A civil ensign for use by Jersey registered merchant ships was approved in 2010, after a consultation process. The flag, which is the British Red Ensign with the badge and crown in the fly, was approved by Queen Elizabeth II, and subsequently by the States of Jersey in June 2010.

A government Blue Ensign, with the badge without the crown in the fly, was given a general warrant in 1997, having originally been issued in 1907 specifically for the government-owned tugboat Duke of Normandy.

== Parish flags ==
Flag of Grouville

Flag of Saint Brelade

Flag of Saint Clement

Flag of Saint Helier

Flag of Saint John

Flag of Saint Lawrence

Flag of Saint Martin

Flag of Saint Mary

Flag of Saint Ouen

Flag of Saint Peter

Flag of Saint Saviour

Flag of Trinity

== See also ==
- Flag of Guernsey
- List of flags of the United Kingdom
