= Flag =

Piece of fabric with a distinctive design and colours

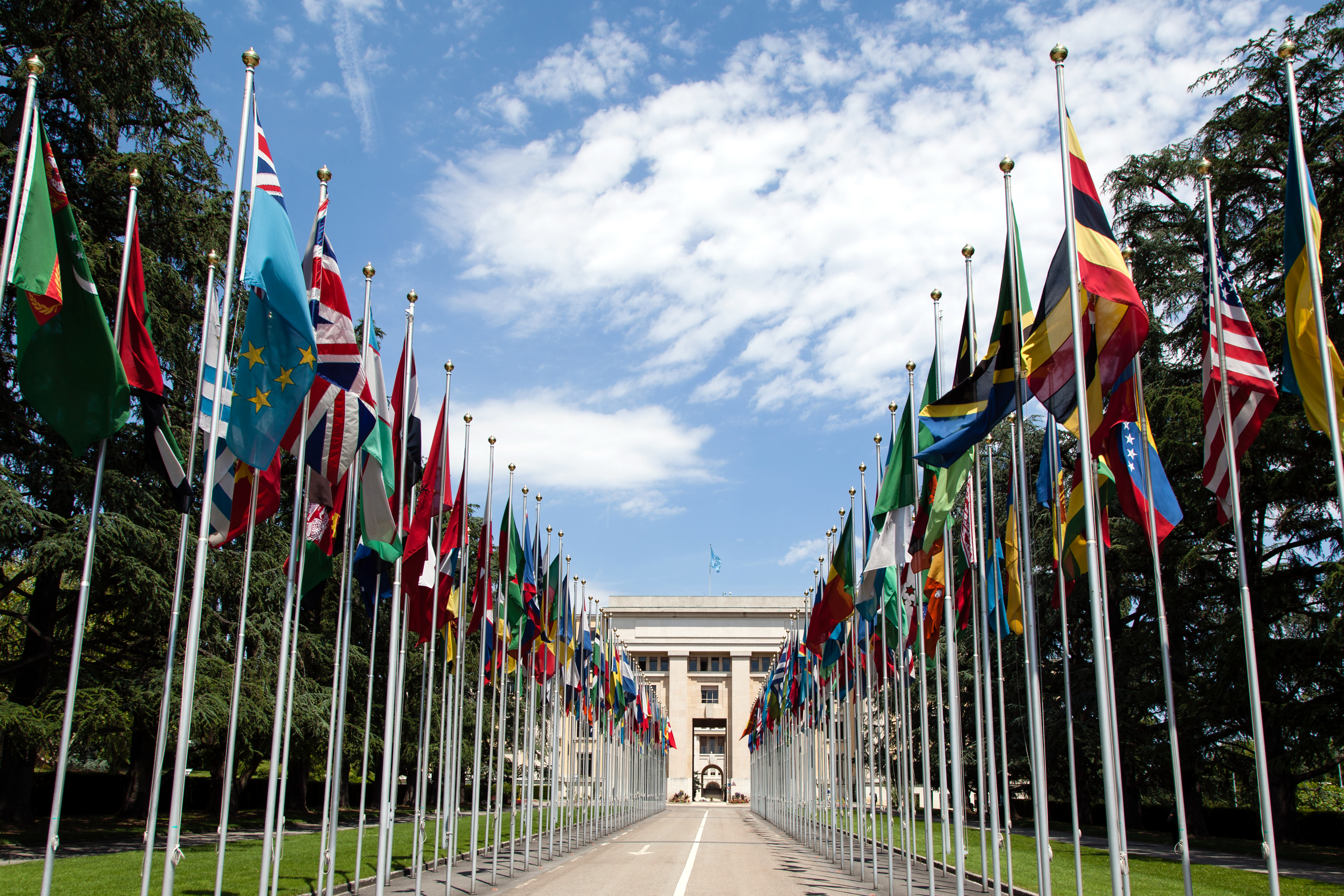
United Nations members' national flags

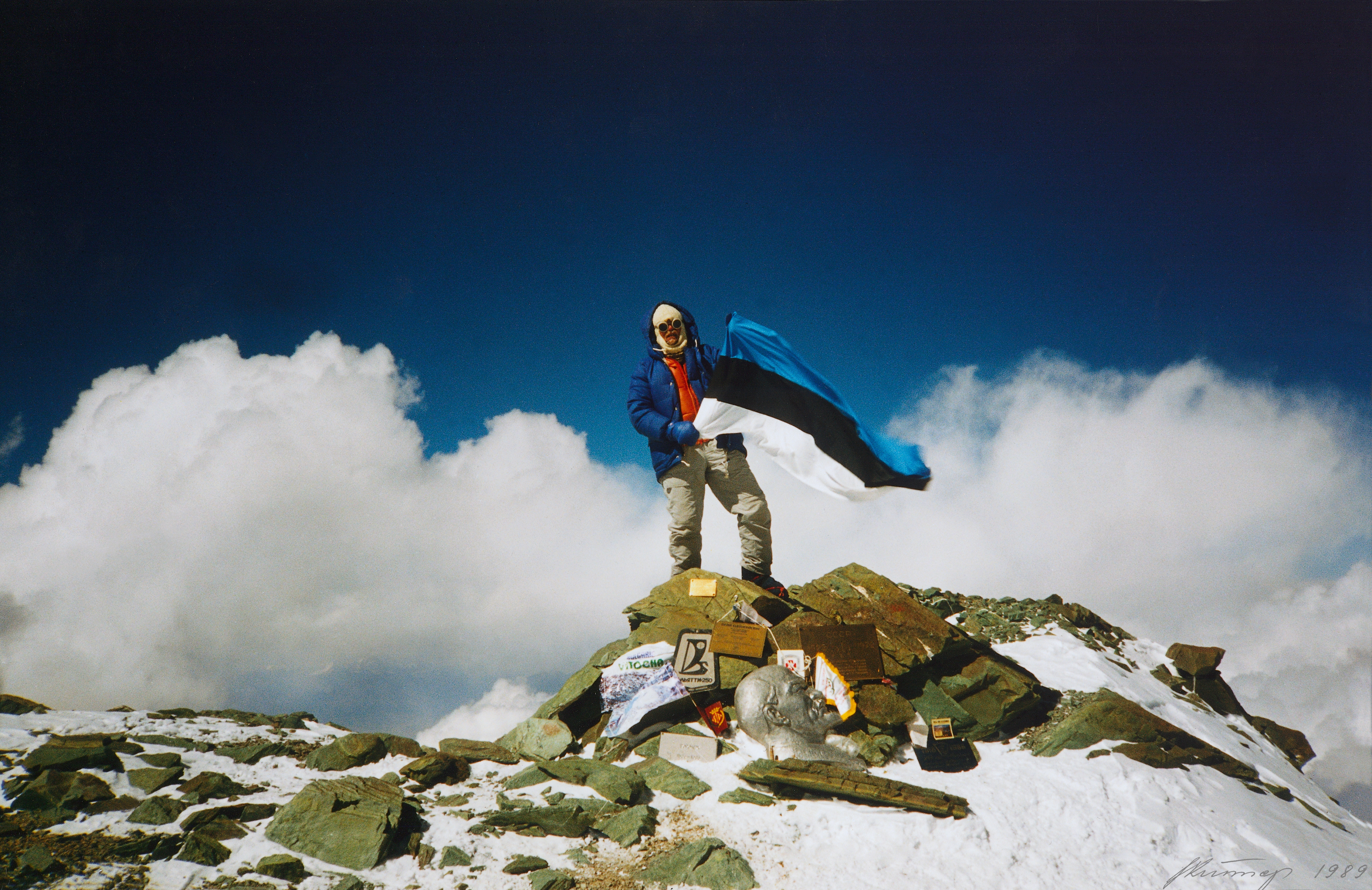
Setting up a flag could also possess the meaning of conquering something. Jaan Künnap with the flag of Estonia at the top of Lenin Peak (7,134 m [23,406 feet]) in 1989.

A flag is a piece of fabric (most often rectangular) with distinctive colours and design, often flown from a pole and used for symbolic, signalling, or decorative purposes. The term flag is also used to refer to the graphic design employed on such pieces of fabric. The study of flags is known as "vexillology" from the Latin vexillum, meaning "flag" or "banner".

The first flags were used to aid military coordination on the battlefield, and flags have since evolved into a common tool for basic signalling and identification, especially in environments where communication is challenging (such as maritime environments where semaphore is used). The national flag is a common patriotic symbol of a country, and many national or other flags may be assigned to flag families based on similarities in their designs that demonstrate a shared history, culture, or influence. Flags are also used in messages, advertising, or for other decorative purposes.

== History ==
Egyptian sign symbolizing dominion over upper and lower Egypt, Egypt, third millennium BC

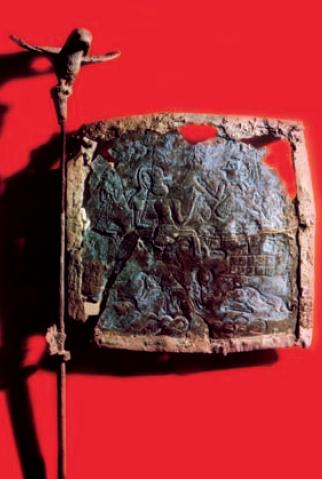
Bronze flag Derafsh Shahdad found in Shahdad in Iran, third millennium BC

The origin of the flag is unknown and it remains unclear when the first flag was raised. Ships with vexilloids were represented on predynastic Egyptian pottery c. 3500 BC. In antiquity, field signs that can be categorised as vexilloid or "flag-like" were used in warfare, originating in ancient Egypt or Assyria. Examples include the Sassanid battle standard Derafsh Kaviani, and the standards of the Roman legions such as the eagle of Augustus Caesar's Xth legion and the dragon standard of the Sarmatians; the latter was allowed to fly freely in the wind, carried by a horseman, but depictions suggest that it bore more similarity to an elongated dragon kite than to a simple flag.

While the origin of the flag remains a mystery, the oldest flag discovered is made of bronze: a Derafsh or 'flag-like' Shahdad, which was found in Shahdad in Iran, and dates back to c. 2400 BC. It features a seated man and a kneeling woman facing each other, with a star in between. This iconography was found in other Iranian Bronze Age pieces of art.

Flags made of cloth were almost certainly the invention of the ancient peoples of the Indian subcontinent or the Zhou dynasty of Ancient China. Chinese flags had iconography such as a red bird, a white tiger, or a blue dragon, and royal flags were to be treated with a level of respect similar to that given to the ruler. Indian flags were often triangular and decorated with attachments such as a yak's tail and the state umbrella. Silk flags either spread to the Near East from China or it was just the silk itself, later fashioned by people who had independently conceptualised a rectangular cloth attached to a pole. They are often mentioned in the early history of Islam and may have been copied from India.

European flags are an independent invention. In the Roman world, the vexillum was a cloth military flag: Schmöger describes it as the only Roman cloth flag, used as a cavalry flag, detachment flag, signal flag, imperial standard, religious flag and provincial symbol, and as "the root of the modern European flag tradition". The Christian Roman labarum, first used by Constantine in the 4th century, was a version of the vexillum; although usually suspended from a horizontal bar, it was also sometimes displayed by fastening one side to the staff.

In medieval Europe, flags developed in connection with warfare, Christianity, heraldry, monarchy, cities, guilds and maritime identification. Heraldic flags included pennons, banners, standards, royal standards, ensigns, military standards and colours; in English heraldic usage, pennons were personal lance flags, banners bore the arms of the owner, and standards displayed livery colours and badges. Modern national flags, in the strict political sense, are associated with early modern and modern state formation, citizenship, revolution and nationalism; Elgenius describes national flags as markers of nation-building in the modern period, especially after the political changes associated with 1789.

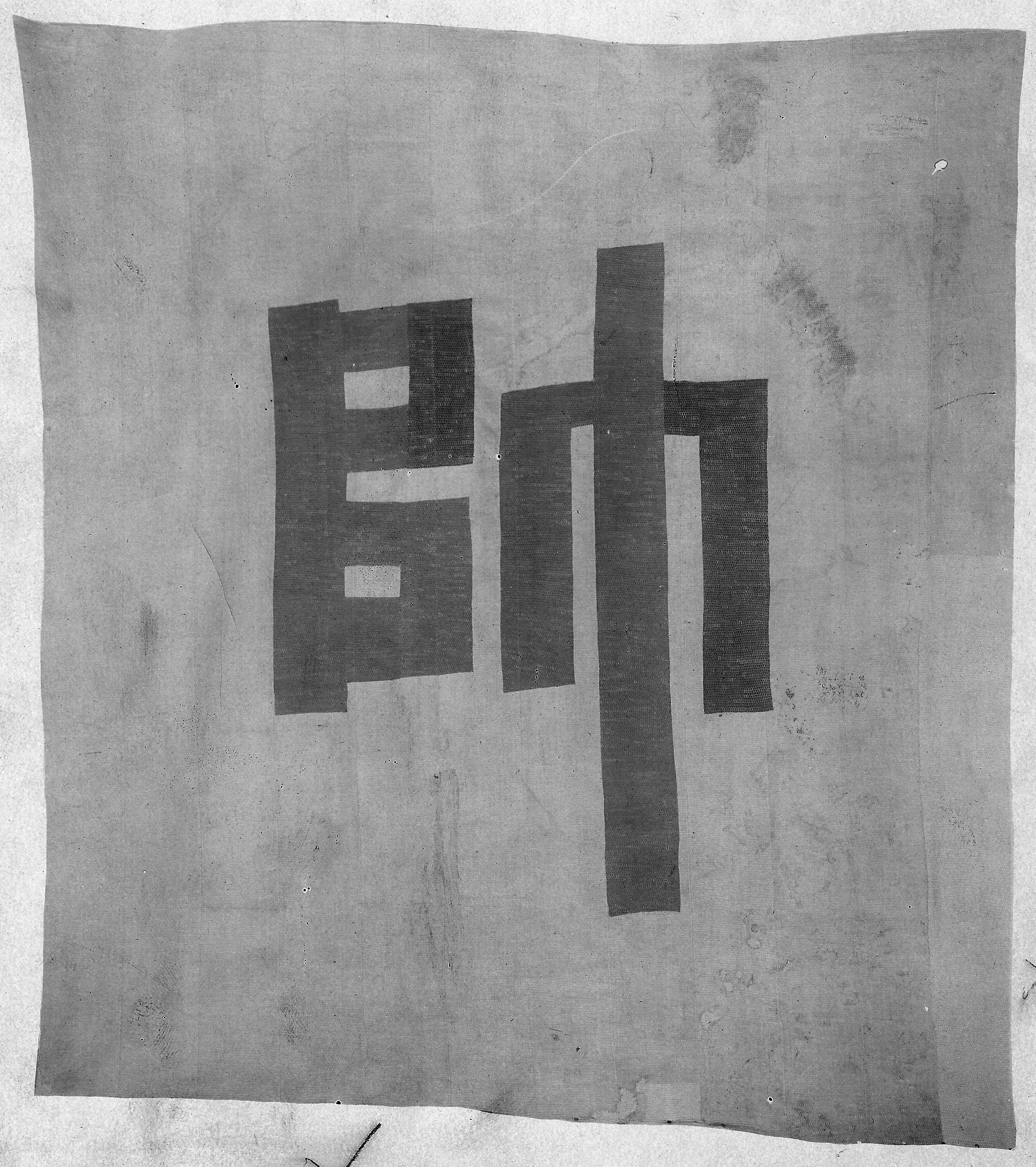
Sujagi of Eo Jae-yeon, captured in 1871

During the peak of the Age of Sail, beginning in the early 17th century, it was customary (and later a legal requirement) for ships to fly flags designating their nationality; these flags eventually evolved into the national flags and maritime flags of today. Flags also became the preferred means of communications at sea, resulting in various systems of flag signals; see, International maritime signal flags.

Use of flags beyond a military or naval context began with the rise of nationalism by the end of the 18th century, although some flags date back earlier. The flags of countries such as Austria, Denmark or Turkey have legendary origins while many others, including those of Poland and Switzerland, grew out of the heraldic emblems of the Middle Ages. The 17th century saw the birth of several national flags through revolutionary struggle. One of these was the flag of the Netherlands, which appeared during the 80-year Dutch rebellion which began in 1568 against Spanish domination.

Political change and social reform, allied with a growing sense of nationhood among ordinary people, led to the creation of new nations and flags all over the world in the 19th and 20th centuries.

== National flags ==
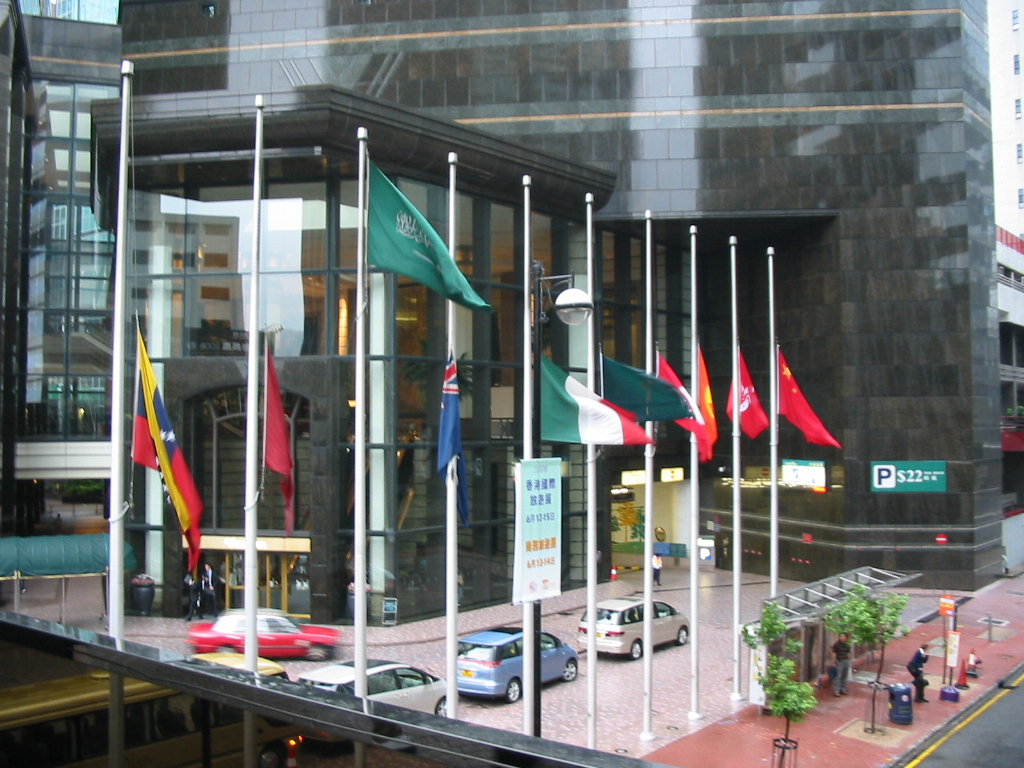
Flags at half-mast outside Central Plaza, Hong Kong, after the 2008 Sichuan earthquake. The Flag of Saudi Arabia is exempted.

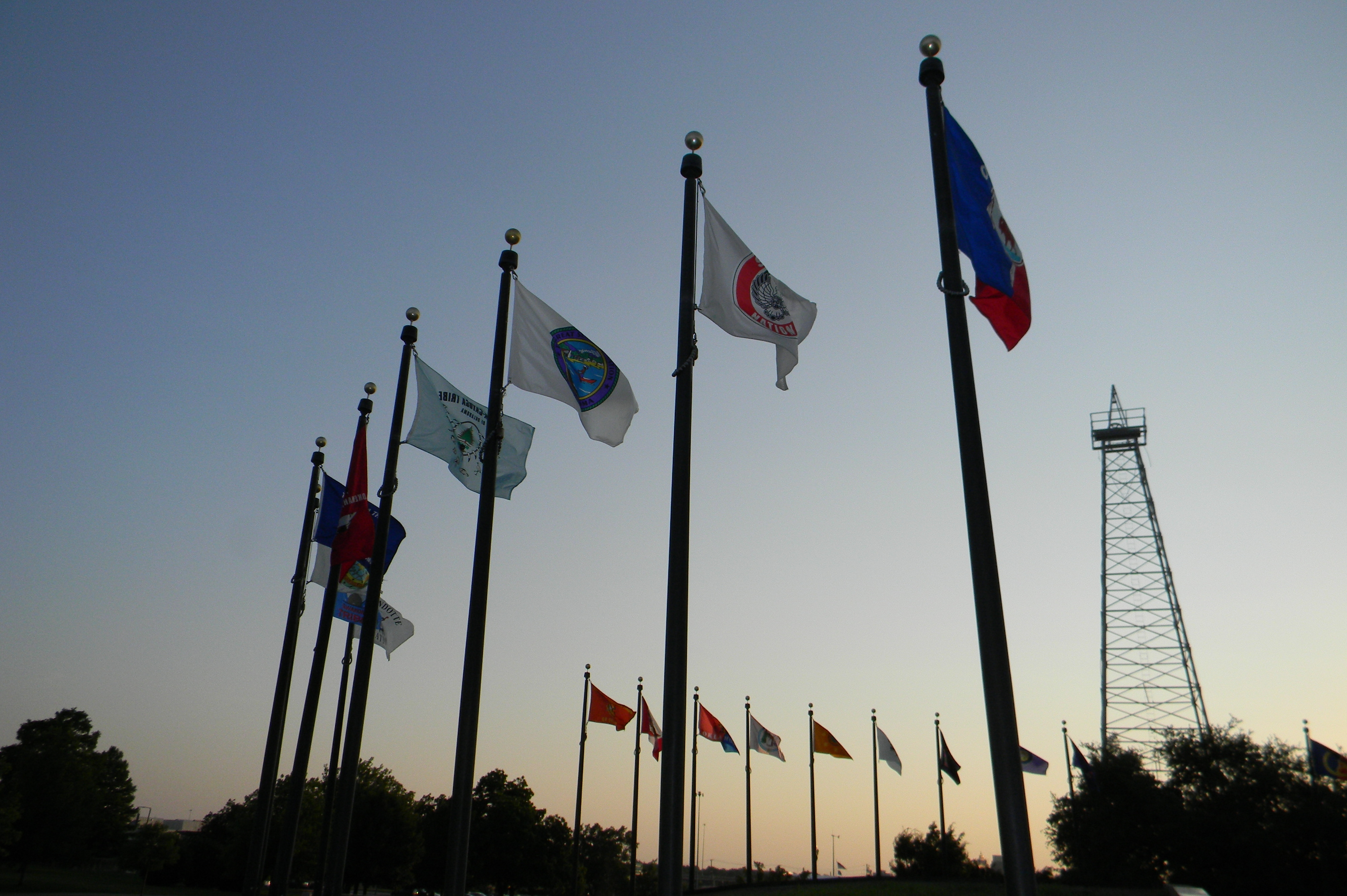
Tribal flags at Meeting Place Monument/Flag Plaza at the Oklahoma State Capitol

One of the most popular uses of a flag is to symbolise a nation or country. Some national flags have been particularly inspirational to other nations, countries, or subnational entities in the design of their own flags. Some prominent examples include:

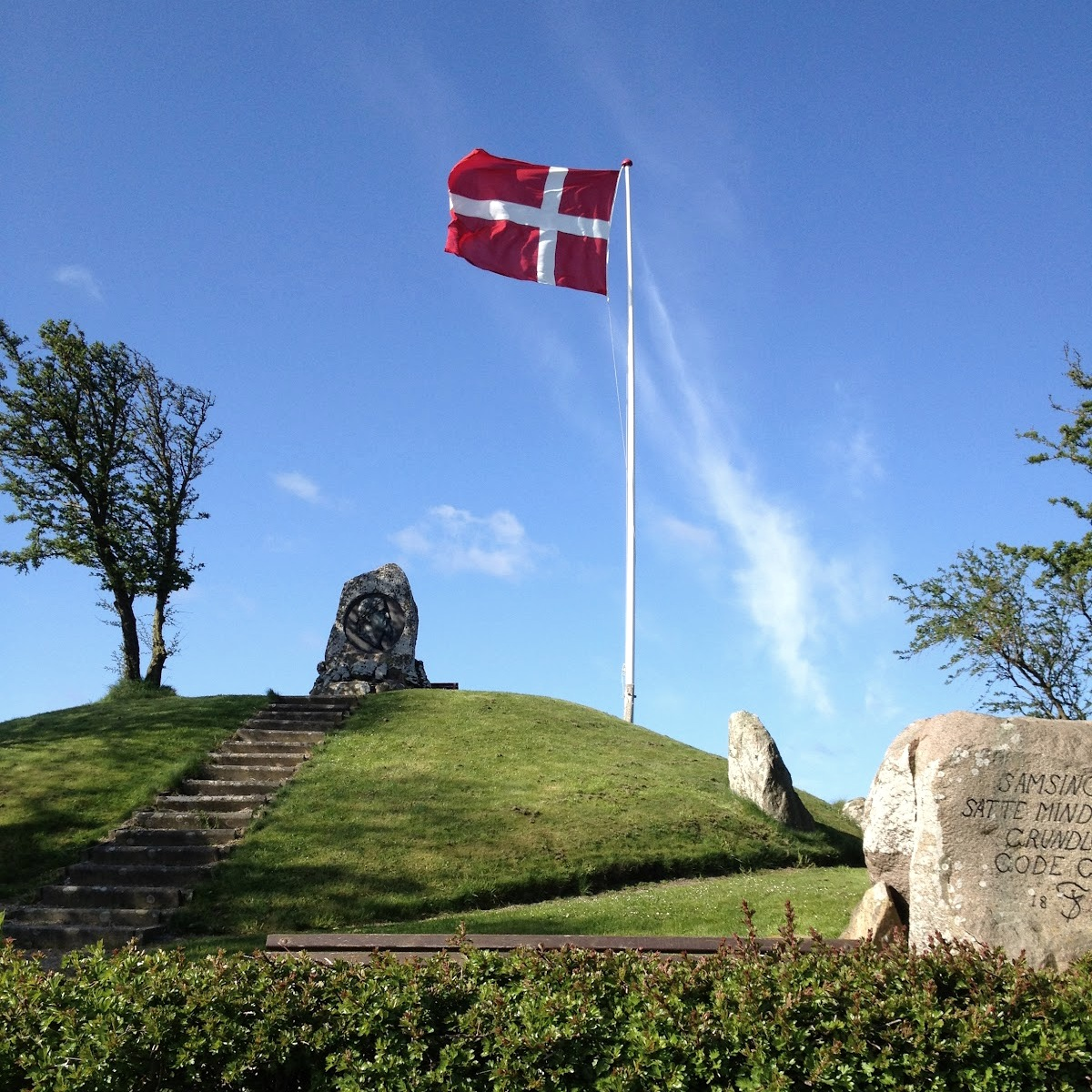
The Danish national flag (Dannebrog) waving in Samsø

- The flag of Denmark, the Dannebrog, is attested in 1478, and is the oldest national flag still in use. It inspired the cross design of the other Nordic countries: Sweden, Norway, Finland, Iceland, and several regional Scandinavian flags, including the Faroe Islands and Åland, as well as flags for the non-Scandinavian Shetland and Orkney.
- The flag of the Netherlands is the oldest tricolour. Its three colours of red, white and blue go back to Charlemagne's time, the ninth century. The coastal region of what today is the Netherlands was then known for its cloth in these colours. Maps from the early 16th century already put flags in these colours next to this region, like Texeira's map of 1520. A century before that, during the 15th century, the three colours were mentioned as the coastal signals for this area, with the three bands straight or diagonal, single or doubled. As state flag it first appeared around 1572 as the Prince's Flag in orange–white–blue. Soon the more famous red–white–blue began appearing, becoming the prevalent version from around 1630. Orange made a comeback during the civil war of the late 18th century, signifying the orangist or pro-stadtholder party. During World War II the pro-Nazi NSB used it. Any symbolism has been added later to the three colours, although the orange comes from the House of Orange-Nassau. This use of orange comes from Nassau, which today uses orange-blue, not from Orange, which today uses red-blue. However, the usual way to show the link with the House of Orange-Nassau is the orange pennant above the red-white-blue. It is said that the Dutch Tricolour has inspired many flags but most notably those of Russia, New York City, and South Africa (the 1928–94 flag as well the current flag). As the probable inspiration for the Russian flag, it is the source too for the pan-Slavic colours red, white and blue, adopted by many Slavic states and peoples as their symbols; examples are Slovakia, Serbia, and Slovenia.
- The national flag of France was designed in 1794. As a forerunner of revolution, France's tricolour flag style has been adopted by other nations. Examples: Italy, Belgium, Ireland, Romania and Mexico.
- The Union Flag (Union Jack) of the United Kingdom is the most commonly used. British colonies typically flew a flag based on one of the ensigns based on this flag, and many former colonies have retained the design to acknowledge their cultural history. Examples: Australia, Fiji, New Zealand, Tuvalu, and also the Canadian provinces of Manitoba, Ontario and British Columbia, and the American state of Hawaii; see commons:Flags based on British ensigns.
- The flag of the United States is nicknamed The Stars and Stripes or Old Glory. Some nations imitated this flag to symbolise their similarity to the United States or the American Revolution. Examples: Liberia, Chile, Taiwan (ROC), and the French region of Brittany.

The Flag of Ethiopia's colours inspired the colours of many African national flags.

- Ethiopia was seen as a model by emerging African states of the 1950s and 1960s, as it was one of the oldest independent states in Africa. Accordingly, its flag became the source of the Pan-African colours, or 'Rasta colours'. Examples: Benin, Togo, Senegal, Ghana, Mali, Guinea.
- The flag of Turkey, which is very similar to the last flag of the old Ottoman Empire, has been an inspiration for the flag designs of many other Muslim nations. During the time of the Ottomans the crescent began to be associated with Islam and this is reflected on the flags of Algeria, Azerbaijan, Comoros, Libya, Mauritania, Pakistan, Tunisia and Maldives.
- The Pan-Arab colours, green, white, red and black, are derived from the flag of the Great Arab Revolt as seen on the flags of Jordan, Libya, Kuwait, Sudan, Syria, the United Arab Emirates, Western Sahara, Egypt, Iraq, Yemen and Palestine.
- The Soviet flag, with its golden symbols of the hammer and sickle on a red field, was an inspiration to flags of other communist states, such as East Germany, China, Vietnam, Angola, Afghanistan (1978–1980) and Mozambique.
- The flag of Venezuela, created by Francisco de Miranda to represent the independence movement in Venezuela that later gave birth to the Gran Colombia, inspired the flags of Colombia, Ecuador, and the Federal Territories in Malaysia, all sharing three bands of yellow, blue and red with the flag of Venezuela.
- The flag of Argentina, created by Manuel Belgrano during the war of independence, was the inspiration for the United Provinces of Central America's flag, which in turn was the origin for the flags of Guatemala, Honduras, El Salvador, and Nicaragua.

National flag designs are often used to signify nationality in other forms, such as flag patches.

=== Civil flags ===
The civil and state flags of Peru share the same red and white bands, but only the state flag (right) is defaced with the national ensign.

A civil flag is a version of the national flag that is flown by civilians on non-government installations or craft. The use of civil flags was more common in the past, in order to denote buildings or ships that were not crewed by the military. In some countries the civil flag is the same as the war flag or state flag, but without the coat of arms, such as in the case of Spain, and in others it is an alteration of the war flag.

=== War flags ===
Standard for the UK's Royal Air Force, the Ensign of the RAF displays the RAF roundel that is also displayed on the fuselage and wings of British warplanes.

Several countries, including the Royal Air Force, British Army and the Royal Navy (White Ensign) of the United Kingdom and the Soviet Union have had unique flags flown by their armed forces separately, rather than the national flag.

Other countries' armed forces (such as those of the United States or Switzerland) use their standard national flag; in addition, the U.S. has alongside flags and seals designed from long tradition for each of its six uniformed military services/military sub-departments in the Department of Defense and the Department of Homeland Security. The Philippines' armed forces may use their standard national flag, but during times of war the flag is turned upside down. Bulgaria's flag is also turned upside down during times of war. These are also considered war flags, though the terminology only applies to the flag's military usage.

Large versions of the war flag flown on the warships of countries' navies are known as battle ensigns. In addition, besides flying the national standard or a military services' emblem flag at a military fort, base, station or post and at sea at the stern (rear) or main top mast of a warship, a Naval Jack flag and other maritime flags, pennants and emblems are flown at the bow (front). In times of war waving a white flag is a banner of truce, talks/negotiations or surrender.

Four distinctive African flags currently in the collection of the National Maritime Museum in Britain were flown in action by Itsekiri ships under the control of Nana Olomu during the conflict in the late 19th century. One is the flag generally known as the Benin Empire flag and one is referred to as Nana Olomu's flag.

=== International flags ===
The Flag of the United Nations, sky blue field with north polar view looking down on a world map in white with two olive branches wreaths curved around. First version presented April–June 1945 to the United Nations Organization (UNO) at the San Francisco Conference, second version adopted by the U.N., December 1946

Among international flags are the United Nations, Europe, Olympic, NATO and Paralympic flags.

== Maritime flags ==
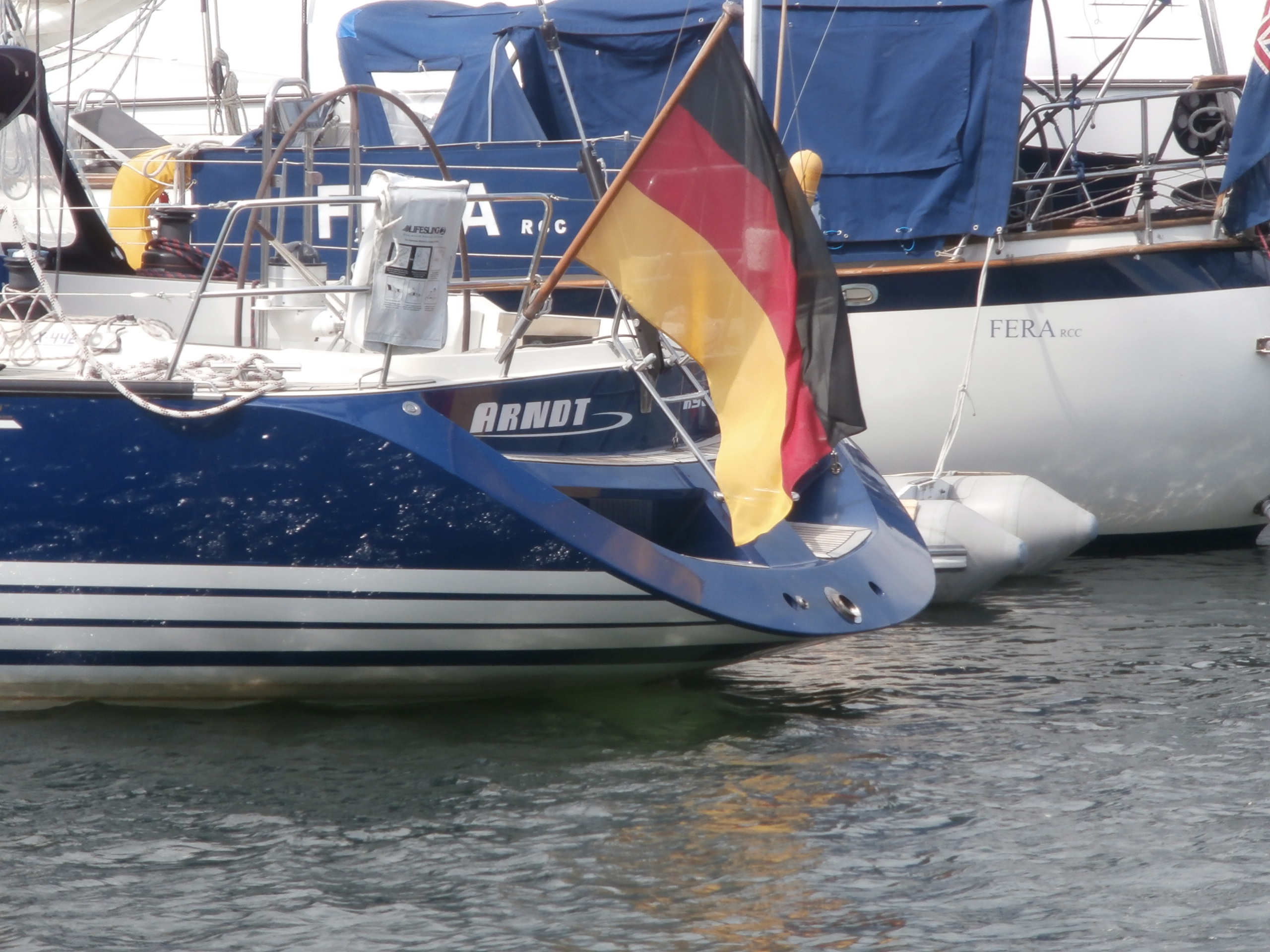
Ensigns are flown on boats to indicate the country of registration of the boat.

Flags are particularly important at sea, where they can mean the difference between life and death, and consequently where the rules and regulations for the flying of flags are strictly enforced. A national flag flown at sea is known as an ensign. A courteous, peaceable merchant ship or yacht customarily flies its ensign (in the usual ensign position), together with the flag of whatever nation it is currently visiting at the mast (known as a courtesy flag). To fly one's ensign alone in foreign waters, a foreign port or in the face of a foreign warship traditionally indicates a willingness to fight, with cannon, for the right to do so. As of 2009, this custom is still taken seriously by many naval and port authorities and is readily enforced in many parts of the world by boarding, confiscation and other civil penalties. In some countries yacht ensigns are different from merchant ensigns in order to signal that the yacht is not carrying cargo that requires a customs declaration. Carrying commercial cargo on a boat with a yacht ensign is deemed to be smuggling in many jurisdictions. Traditionally, a vessel flying under the courtesy flag of a specific nation, regardless of the vessel's country of registry, is considered to be operating under the law of her 'host' nation.

The international maritime signal flag Kilo (letter K)

There is a system of international maritime signal flags for numerals and letters of the alphabet. Each flag or pennant has a specific meaning when flown individually. As well, semaphore flags can be used to communicate on an ad hoc basis from ship to ship over short distances.

Another category of maritime flag flown by some United States government ships is the distinctive mark. Although the United States Coast Guard has its own service ensign, all other U.S. government ships fly the national ensign as their service ensign, following United States Navy practice. To distinguish themselves from ships of the Navy, such ships historically have flown their parent organisation's flag from a forward mast as a distinctive mark. Today, for example, commissioned ships of the National Oceanic and Atmospheric Administration (NOAA) fly the NOAA flag as a distinctive mark.

== Shapes and designs ==
The flag of Nepal, a non-rectangular flag that is a double-pennon

The Ohio flag, a pennon

The flag of Mauritania, a yellow crescent and star on a green field between two red stripes.

Flags are usually rectangular in shape (often in the ratio 2:3, 1:2, or 3:5), but may be of any shape or size that is practical for flying, including square, triangular, or swallow tailed. A more unusual flag shape is that of the flag of Nepal, which is in the shape of two stacked triangles. Other unusually shaped flags include the civil flags of Ohio (a swallowtail); Tampa, Florida; and Pike County, Ohio.

Many flags are dyed through and through to be inexpensive to manufacture, such that the reverse side is the mirror image of the obverse (front) side, generally the side displayed when, from the observer's point of view, the flag flies from pole-side left to right. This presents two possibilities:

1. If the design is symmetrical in an axis parallel to the flag pole, obverse and reverse will be identical despite the mirror-reversal, such as the Indian Flag or Canadian Flag
2. If not, the obverse and reverse will present two variants of the same design, one with the hoist on the left (usually considered the obverse side), the other with the hoist on the right (usually considered the reverse side of the flag). This is very common and usually not disturbing if there is no text in the design.

Some complex flag designs are not intended to be shown on both sides, requiring separate obverse and reverse sides if made correctly. In these cases there is a design element (usually text) which is not symmetric and should be read in the same direction, regardless of whether the hoist is to the viewer's left or right. These cases can be divided into two types:

1. The same (asymmetric) design may be duplicated on both sides. Such flags can be manufactured by creating two identical through and through flags and then sewing them back to back, though this can affect the resulting combination's responsiveness to the wind. Depictions of such flags may be marked with the symbol, indicating the reverse is congruent to (rather than a mirror image of) the obverse.
2. Rarely, the reverse design may differ, in whole or in part, from that of the obverse. Examples of flags whose reverse differs from the obverse include the flag of Paraguay, the flag of Oregon, and the historical flag of the Soviet Union. Depictions of such flags may be marked with the symbol.

The flag of Kiribati, a banner of arms

Common designs on flags include crosses, stripes, and divisions of the surface, or field, into bands or quarters—patterns and principles mainly derived from heraldry. A heraldic coat of arms may also be flown as a banner of arms, as is done on both the state flag of Maryland and the flag of Kiribati.

The de jure flag of Libya under Muammar Gaddafi, which consisted of a rectangular field of green, was for a long period the only national flag using a single colour and no design or insignia. However, other historical states have also used flags without designs or insignia, such as the short-lived Soviet Republic of Hungary and the more recent Sultanate of Muscat and Oman, whose flags were both a plain field of red.

Colours are normally described with common names, such as "red", but may be further specified using colourimetry.

The largest flag flown from a flagpole worldwide, according to Guinness World Records, is the flag of the United Arab Emirates flown in Sharjah. This flag was 2,448.56 m^{2} (26,356.1 sq ft). The largest flag ever made was the flag of Qatar; the flag, which measures at 101,978 m^{2} (1,097,680 sq ft), was completed in December 2013 in Doha.

=== Parts of a flag ===
The general parts of a flag are: canton (the upper inner section of the flag), field or ground (the entire flag except the canton), the hoist (the edge used to attach the flag to the hoist), and the fly (the furthest edge from the hoist end).

=== Vertical flags ===
Vertical flags are sometimes used in lieu of the standard horizontal flag in central and eastern Europe, particularly in the German-speaking countries. This practice came about because the relatively brisk wind needed to display horizontal flags is not common in these countries.

The standard horizontal flag (no. 1 in the preceding illustration) is nonetheless the form most often used even in these countries.

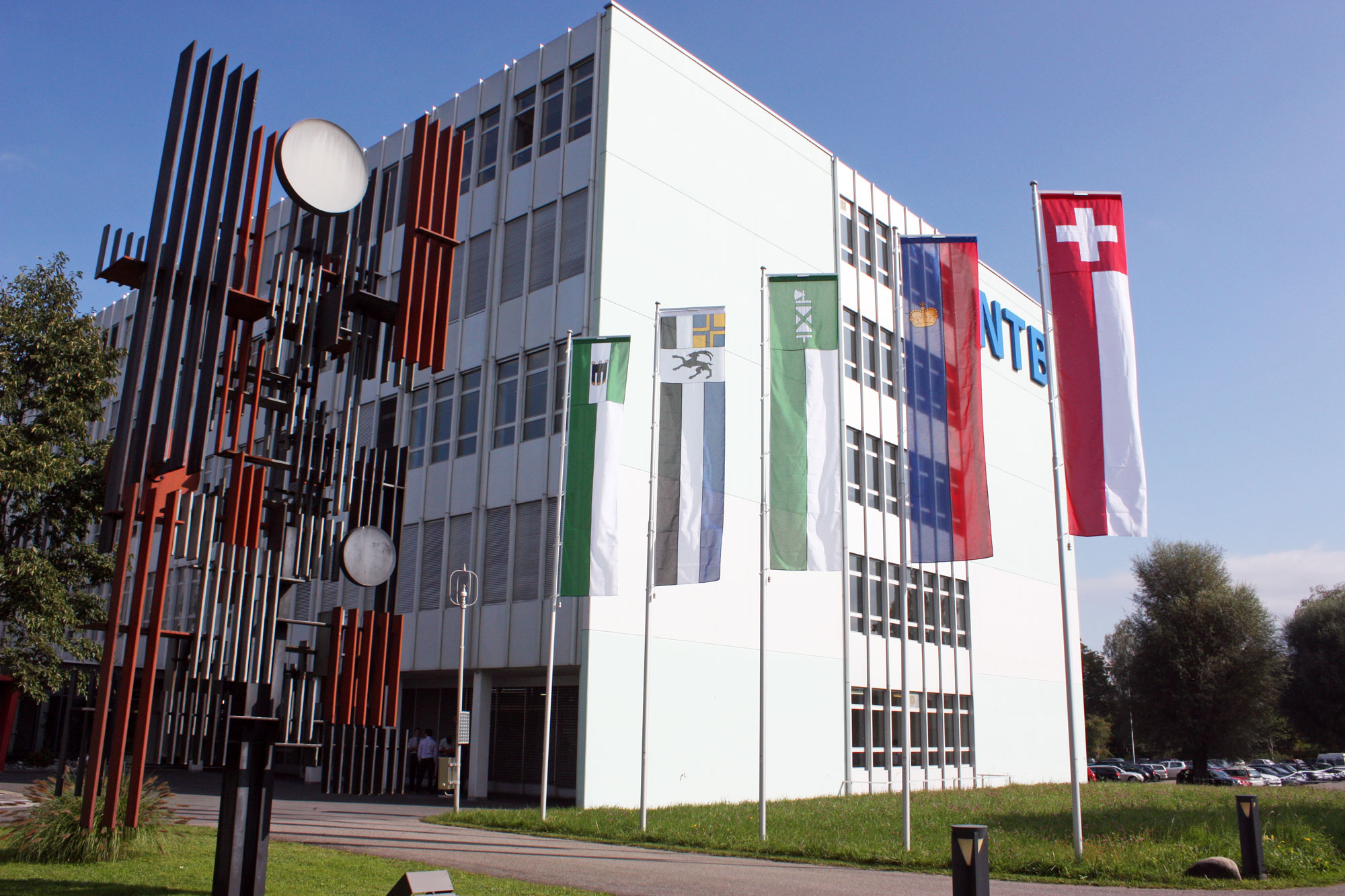
Vertical flags seen in Switzerland

The vertical flag (German: Hochformatflagge or Knatterflagge; no. 2) is a vertical form of the standard flag. The flag's design may remain unchanged (No. 2a) or it may change, e.g. by changing horizontal stripes to vertical ones (no. 2b). If the flag carries an emblem, it may remain centred or may be shifted slightly upwards.

The vertical flag for hoisting from a beam (German: Auslegerflagge or Galgenflagge; no. 3) is additionally attached to a horizontal beam, ensuring that it is fully displayed even if there is no wind.

The vertical flag for hoisting from a horizontal pole (German: Hängeflagge; no. 4) is hoisted from a horizontal pole, normally attached to a building. The topmost stripe on the horizontal version of the flag faces away from the building.

The vertical flag for hoisting from a crossbar or banner (German: Bannerflagge; no. 5) is firmly attached to a horizontal crossbar from which it is hoisted, either by a vertical pole (no. 5a) or a horizontal one (no. 5b). The topmost stripe on the horizontal version of the flag normally faces to the left.

== Religious flags ==
Flags can play many different roles in religion. In Buddhism, prayer flags are used, usually in sets of five differently coloured flags. Several flags and banners including the Black Standard are associated with Islam. Many national flags and other flags include religious symbols such as the cross, the crescent, or a reference to a patron saint. Flags are also adopted by religious groups and flags such as the Jain flag, Nishan Sahib (Sikhism), the Saffron flag (Hindu) and the Christian flag are used to represent a whole religion.

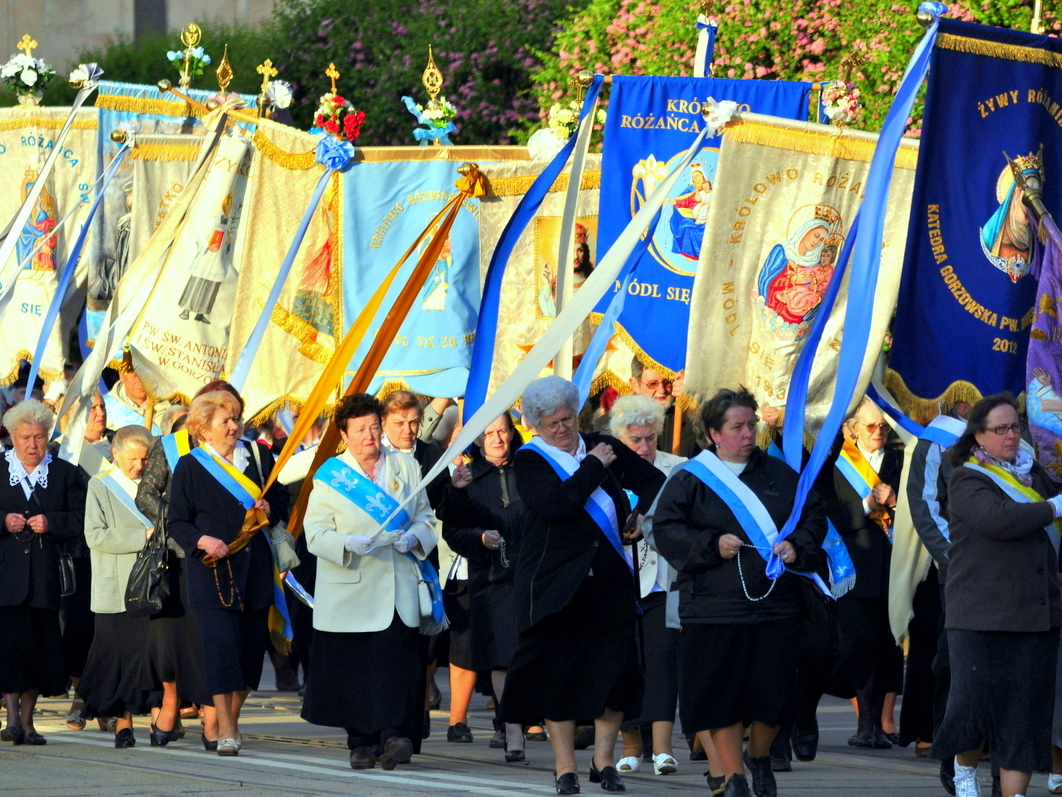
Poland (Gorzów Wlkp.). Religious flags

Christian Flag adopted by several Protestant denominations

Jain flag (on occasion, the bottom black bar is replaced with a dark blue one)

Buddhist flag

Nishan Sahib (the Sikh flag)

== In sports ==
Because of their ease of signalling and identification, flags are often used in sports.

- In association football, linesmen carry small flags along the touch lines. They use the flags to indicate to the referee potential infringements of the laws, or who is entitled to possession of the ball that has gone out of the field of play, or, most famously, raising the flag to indicate an offside offence. Officials called touch judges use flags for similar purposes in both codes of rugby.
- In American and Canadian football, referees use penalty flags to indicate that a foul has been committed in game play. The phrase used for such an indication is flag on the play. The flag itself is a small, weighted handkerchief, tossed on the field at the approximate point of the infraction; the intent is usually to sort out the details after the current play from scrimmage has concluded. In American football, the flag is yellow; in Canadian football the flag is orange, but at the professional level the flag is yellow. In both the Canadian Football League and National Football League, coaches also use red challenge flags to indicate that they wish to contest a ruling on the field.
- In yacht racing, flags are used to communicate information from the race committee boat to the racers. Different flags hoisted from the committee boat may communicate a false start, changes in the course, a cancelled race, or other important information. Racing boats themselves may also use flags to symbolise a protest or distress. The flags are often part of the nautical alphabetic system of International maritime signal flags, in which 26 different flags designate the 26 letters of the Latin alphabet.

Flag flown at a car race

- In auto and motorcycle racing, racing flags are used to communicate with drivers. Most famously, a checkered flag of black and white squares indicates the end of the race, and victory for the leader. A yellow flag is used to indicate caution requiring slow speed and a red flag requires racers to stop immediately. A black flag is used to indicate penalties.

- In addition, fans of almost all sports wave flags in the stands to indicate their support for the participants. Many sports teams have their own flags, and, in individual sports, fans will indicate their support for a player by waving the flag of their home country.
- Capture the flag is a popular children's sport.
- In Gaelic football and Hurling a green flag is used to indicate a goal while a white flag is used to indicate a point
- In Australian rules football, the goal umpire will wave two flags to indicate a goal (worth six points) and a single flag to indicate a behind (worth one point).
- For safety, dive flags indicate the locations of underwater scuba divers or that diving operations are being conducted in the vicinity.
- In water sports such as wakeboarding and Water-Skiing, an orange flag is held in between runs to indicate someone is in the water.
- In golf, the hole is almost always marked with a flag. The flagpole is designed to fit centred within the base of the hole and is removable. Many courses will use colour-coded flags to determine a hole location at the front, middle or rear of the green. However, colour-coded flags are not used in the professional tours. (A rare example of a golf course that does not use flags to mark the hole is the East Course of Merion Golf Club, which instead uses flagpoles topped by wicker baskets.)
- Flag poles with flags of all shapes and sizes are used by marching bands, drum corps, and winter guard teams use flags as a method of visual enhancement in performances.

== Diplomatic and political flags ==
Some countries use diplomatic flags, such as the United Kingdom (see image of the Embassy flag) and the Kingdom of Thailand (see image of the Embassy flag).

The socialist movement uses red flags to represent their cause. The anarchist movement has a variety of different flags, but the primary flag associated with them is the black flag. In the Spanish Civil War, the anarchists used the red and black bisected flag. In the 20th century, the rainbow flag was adopted as a symbol of the LGBT social movements. Its derivatives include the Bisexual pride and Transgender pride flags.

Some of these political flags have become national flags, such as the red flag of the Soviet Union and national socialist banners for Nazi Germany. The present Flag of Portugal is based on what had been the political flag of the Portuguese Republican Party previous to the 5 October 1910 revolution which brought this party to power.

== Personal flags ==
Personal flag of Queen Elizabeth II

Throughout history, monarchs have often had personal flags (including royal standards), representing the royal person, including in personal union of national monarchies.

== Vehicle flags ==
Flags are often representative of an individual's affinity or allegiance to a country, team or business and can be presented in various ways. A popular trend that has surfaced revolves around the idea of the 'mobile' flag in which an individual displays their particular flag of choice on their vehicle. These items are commonly referred to as car flags and are usually manufactured from high strength polyester material and are attached to a vehicle via a polypropylene pole and clip window attachment.

== Swimming flags ==
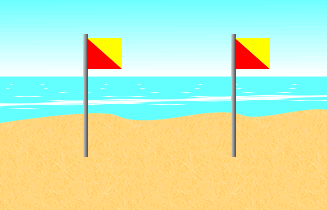
Open swimming area

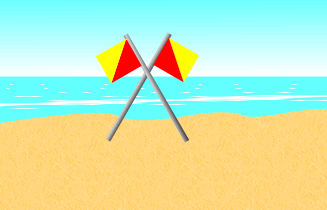
Closed swimming area

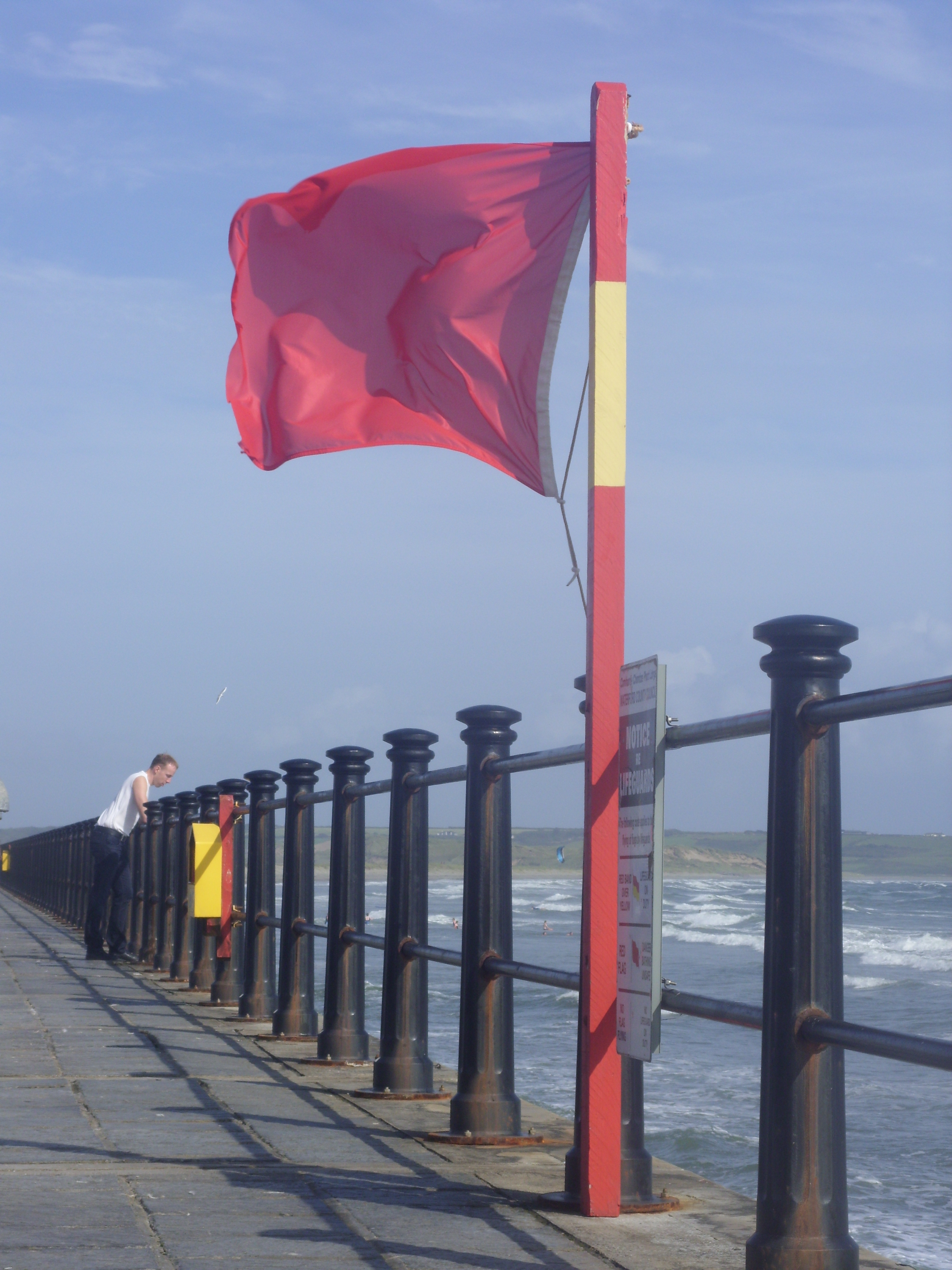
Red flag at a beach in Ireland, indicating that the water is not safe for swimming

In Australia, Canada, New Zealand, the Philippines, Ireland and the United Kingdom, a pair of red-yellow flags is used to mark the limits of the bathing area on a beach, usually guarded by surf lifesavers. If the beach is closed, the poles of the flags are crossed. The flags are coloured with a red triangle and a yellow triangle making a rectangular flag, or a red rectangle over a yellow rectangle. On many Australian beaches there is a slight variation with beach condition signalling. A red flag signifies a closed beach (in the UK also other dangers), yellow signifies strong current or difficult swimming conditions, and green represents a beach safe for general swimming. In Ireland, a red and yellow flag indicates that it is safe to swim; a red flag that it is unsafe; and no flag indicates that there are no lifeguards on duty. Blue flags may also be used away from the yellow-red lifesaver area to designate a zone for surfboarding and other small, non-motorised watercraft.

Reasons for closing the beach include:

- dangerous rip
- hurricane warning
- no lifeguards in attendance
- overpolluted water
- sharks
- tsunami
- waves too strong

A surf flag exists, divided into four quadrants. The top left and bottom right quadrants are black, and the remaining area is white.

Signal flag "India" (a black circle on a yellow square) is frequently used to denote a "blackball" zone where surfboards cannot be used but other water activities are permitted.

The United States uses beach warning flags created by the International Life Saving Federation and endorsed and conditionally approved by the United States Lifesaving Association.

== Railway flags ==
Railways use a number of coloured flags. When used as wayside signals they usually use the following meanings (exact meanings are set by the individual railroad company):

- red = stop
- yellow = proceed with caution
- green or white = proceed.
- a flag of any colour waved vigorously means stop
- a blue flag on the side of a locomotive means that it should not be moved because someone is working on it (or on the train attached to it). A blue flag on a track means that nothing on that track should be moved. The flag can only be removed by the person or group that placed it. In the railway dominated steel industry this principle of "blue flag and tag" was extended to all operations at Bethlehem Steel, Lackawanna, New York. If a man went inside a large machine or worked on an electrical circuit for example, his blue flag and tag was sacrosanct. The "Lock Out/Tag Out" practice is similar and now used in other industries to comply with safety regulations.

At night, the flags are replaced with lanterns showing the same colours.

Flags displayed on the front of a moving locomotive are an acceptable replacement for classification lights and usually have the following meanings (exact meanings are set by the individual railroad company):

- white = extra (not on the timetable)
- green = another section following
- red = last section

Additionally, a railroad brakeman will typically carry a red flag to make their hand signals more visible to the engineer. Railway signals are a development of railway flags.

== Flagpoles ==
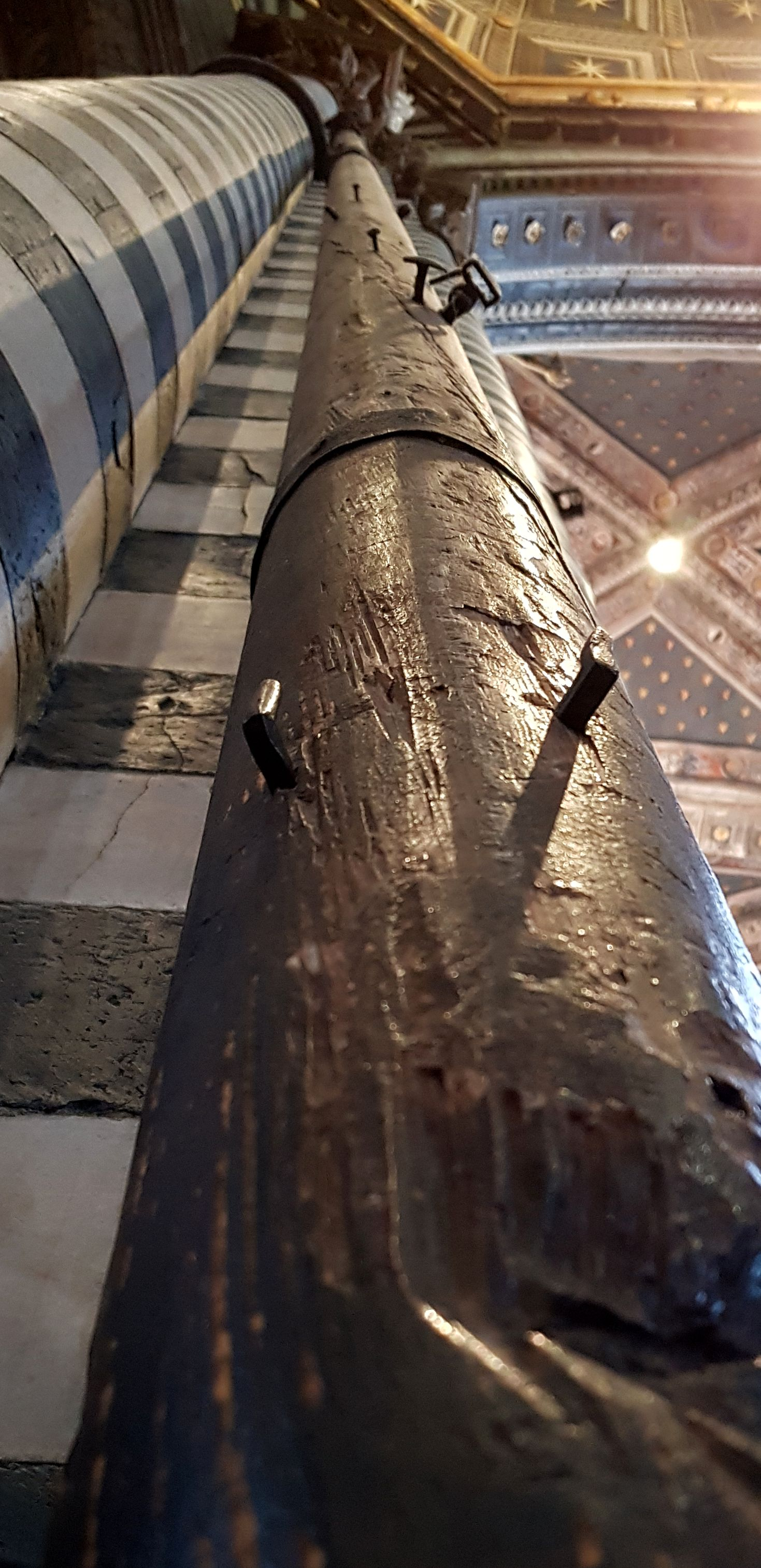
One of the two 60-foot-tall flagpoles in the Siena Cathedral. During the battle of Montaperti (1260), Bocca degli Abati, a Sienese spy, brought Florence's flag down, causing panic among the Florentine soldiers and ultimately their defeat.

A flagpole, flagmast, flagstaff, or staff can be a simple support made of wood or metal. If it is taller than can be easily reached to raise the flag, a cord is used, looping around a pulley at the top of the pole with the ends tied at the bottom. The flag is fixed to one lower end of the cord, and is then raised by pulling on the other end. The cord is then tightened and tied to the pole at the bottom. The pole is usually topped by a flat plate or ball called a "truck" (originally meant to keep a wooden pole from splitting) or a finial in a more complex shape. Very high flagpoles may require more complex support structures than a simple pole, such as a guyed mast.

Dwajasthambam are flagpoles commonly found at the entrances of South Indian Hindu temples.

=== Record heights ===
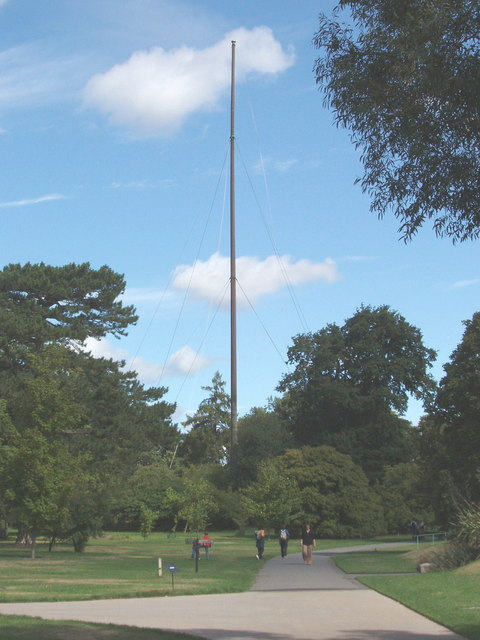
The former flagpole in Kew Gardens, taken shortly before its removal in 2007

Since 26 December 2021, the tallest free-standing flagpole in the world is the Cairo Flagpole, located in the New Administrative Capital under construction in Egypt at a height of 201.952 m (662.57 ft), exceeding the former record holders, the Jeddah Flagpole in Saudi Arabia (height: 171 m; 561 ft), the Dushanbe Flagpole in Tajikistan (height: 165 m; 541 ft) and the National Flagpole in Azerbaijan (height: 162 m; 531 ft). The flagpole in North Korea is the fourth tallest flagpole in the world, however, it is not free-standing. It is a radio tower supported flagpole. Many of these were built by American company Trident Support: the Dushanbe Flagpole, the National Flagpole in Azerbaijan, the Ashgabat flagpole in Turkmenistan at 133 m (436 ft); the Aqaba Flagpole in Jordan at 130 m (430 ft); the Raghadan Flagpole in Jordan at 126.8 m (416 ft); and the Abu Dhabi Flagpole in the United Arab Emirates at 122 m (400 ft).

The current tallest flagpole in India (and the tallest flying the tricolour) is the 110-metre (360 ft) flagpole in Belgaum, Karnataka which was first hoisted on 12 March 2018. The tallest flagpole in the United Kingdom from 1959 until 2013 stood in Kew Gardens. It was made from a Canadian Douglas-fir tree and was 68.5 m (225 ft) in height.

The current tallest flagpole in the United States (and the tallest flying an American flag) is the 400-foot (120 m) pole completed before Memorial Day 2014 and custom-made with an 11-foot (3.4 m) base in concrete by wind turbine manufacturer Broadwind Energy. It is situated on the north side of the Acuity Insurance headquarters campus along Interstate 43 in Sheboygan, Wisconsin, and is visible from Cedar Grove. The pole can fly a 220-pound flag in light wind conditions and a heavier 350-pound flag in higher wind conditions.

=== Design ===
Flagpoles can be designed in one piece with a taper (typically a steel taper or a Greek entasis taper), or be made from multiple pieces to make them able to expand. In the United States, ANSI/NAAMM guide specification FP-1001-97 covers the engineering design of metal flagpoles to ensure safety.

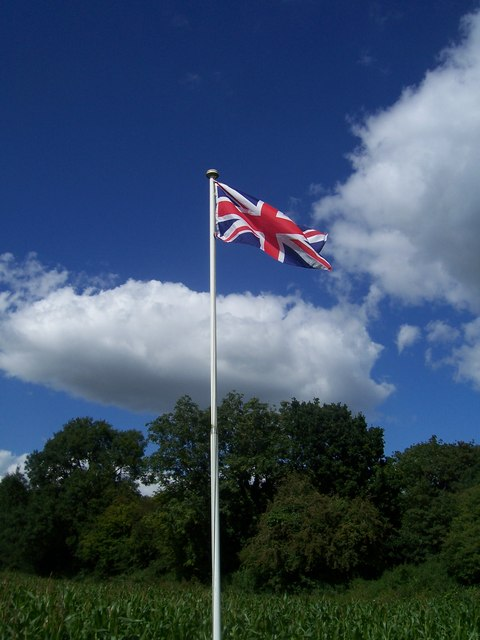
Flagpole of modest size, with simple truck

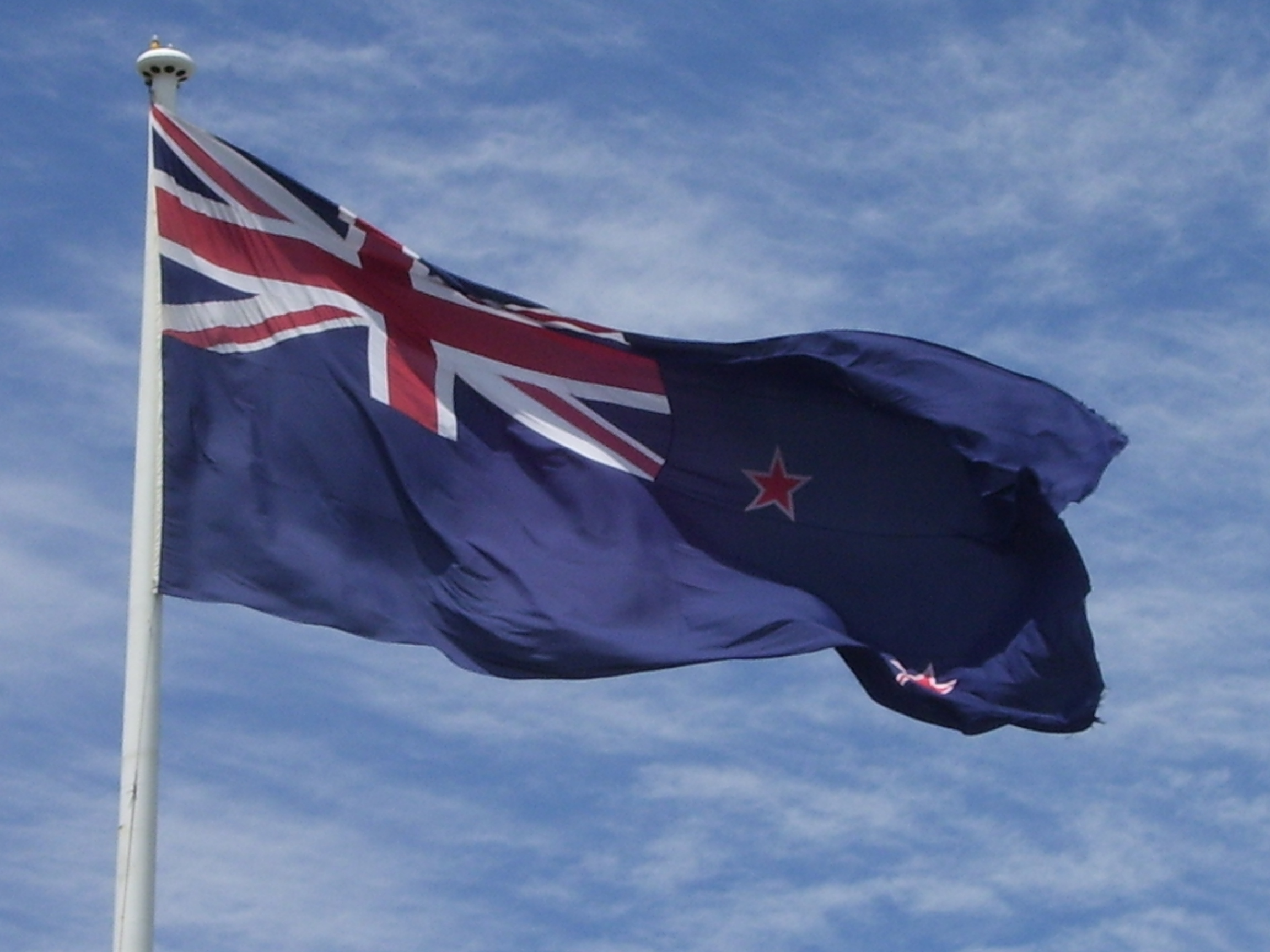
Large flagpole, showing structured truck (New Zealand)

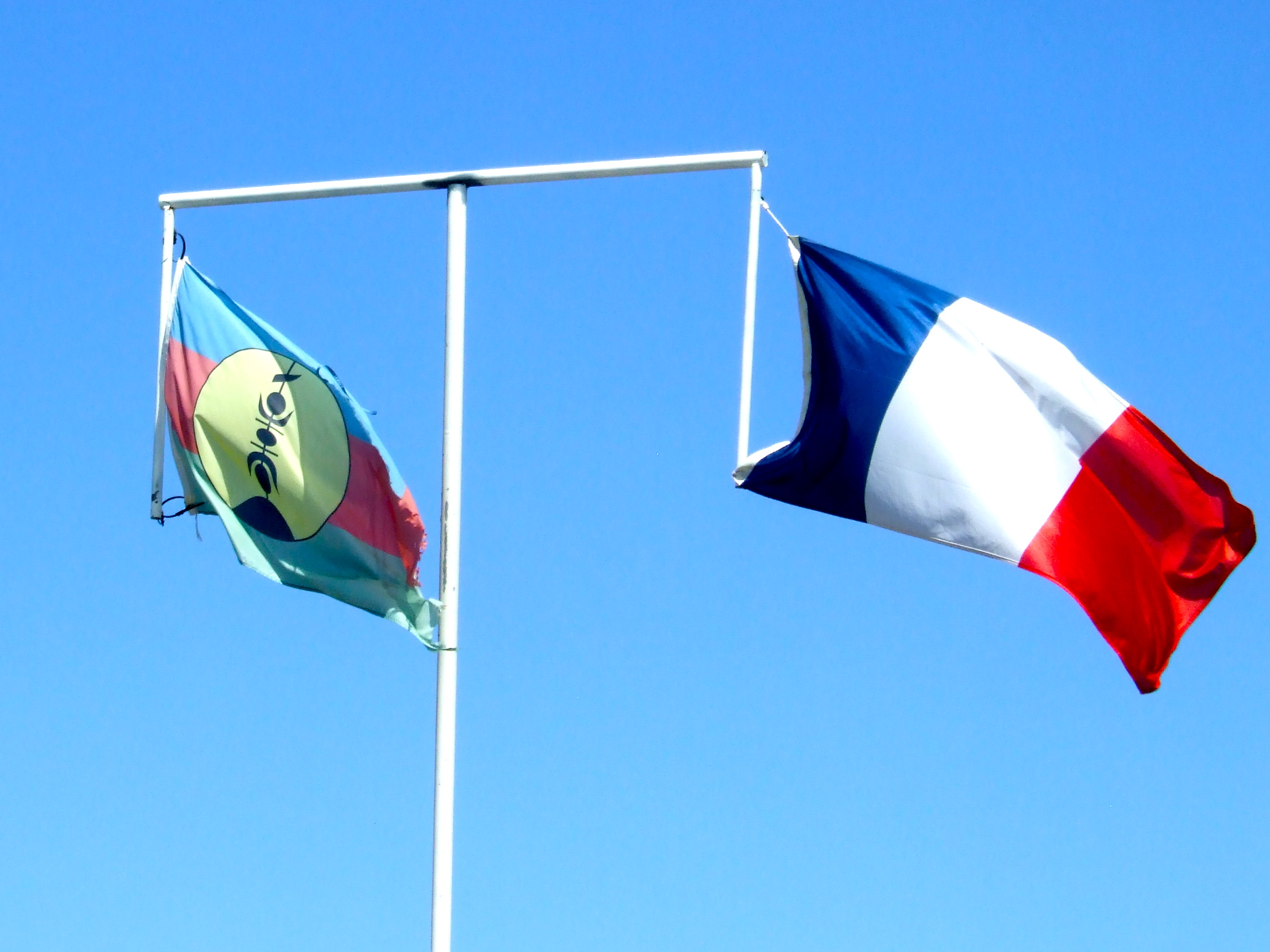
New Caledonia has two flags, flown here in Nouméa, the capital city, on a single flagpole with a crossbar

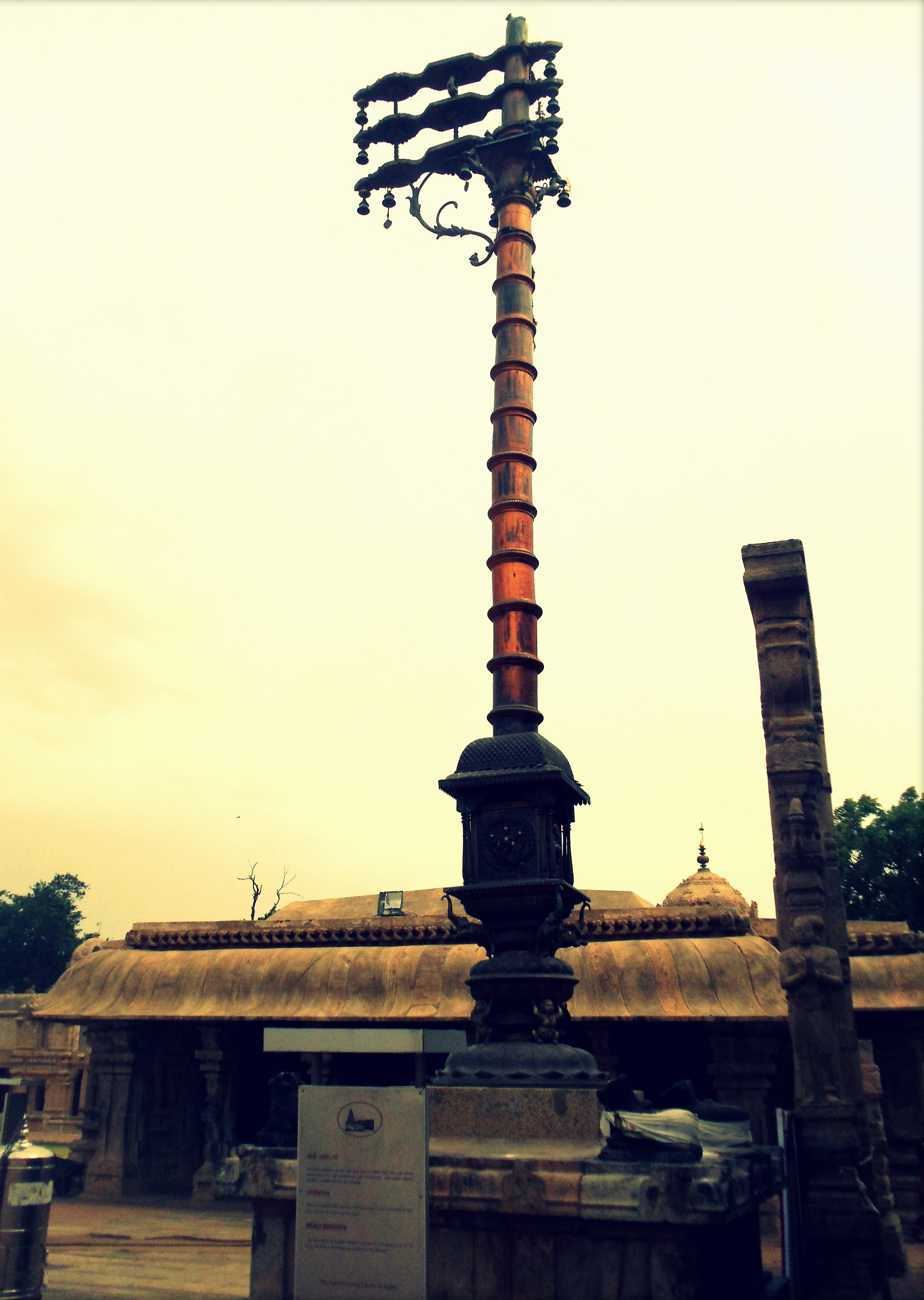
Dwajasthambam (flagpole) at Brihadeeswarar Temple in Thanjavur, Tamil Nadu, India

== Hoisting the flag ==
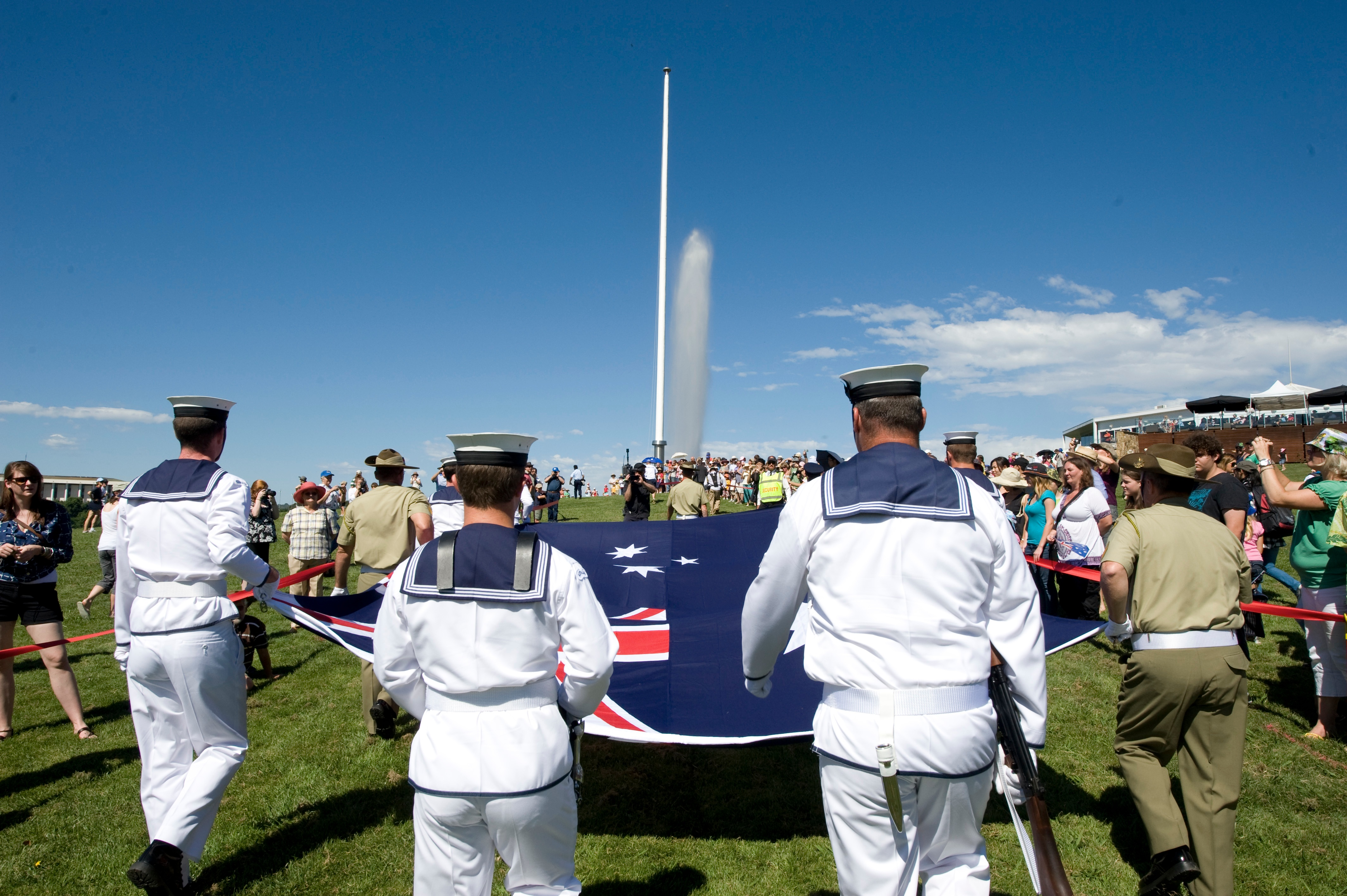
Flag of Australia at a flag-hoisting ceremony on Australian Citizenship Day 2011

Hoisting the flag is the act of raising the flag on the flagpole. Raising or lowering flags, especially national flags, usually involves ceremonies and certain sets of rules, depending on the country, and usually involve the performance of a national anthem.

A flag-raising squad is a group of people, usually troops, cadets, or students, that march in and bring the flags for the flag-hoisting ceremony. Flag-hoisting ceremonies involving flag-raising squads can be simple or elaborate, involving large numbers of squads. Elaborate flag-hoisting ceremonies are usually performed on national holidays.

The cord or rope that ties a flag to its pole is called a halyard. Flags may have a strip of fabric along the hoist side called a heading for the halyard to pass through, or a pair of grommets for the halyard to be threaded through. Flags may also be held in position using Inglefield clips.

== Flags in communication ==
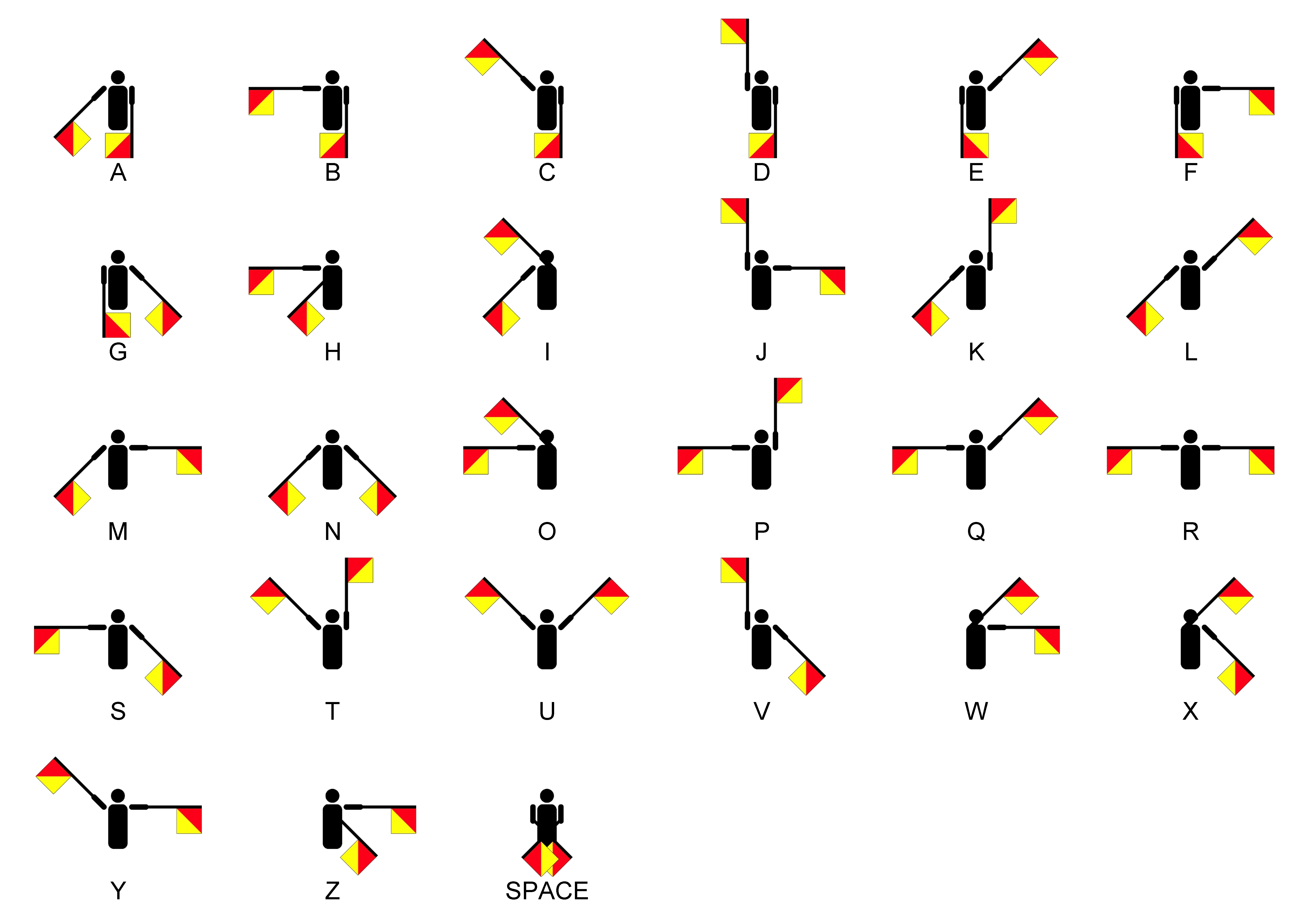
Semaphore signals for the letters of the English alphabet

Semaphore is a form of communication that utilises flags. The signalling is performed by an individual using two flags (or lighted wands), the positions of the flags indicating a symbol. The person who holds the flags is known as the signalman. This form of communication is primarily used by naval signallers. This technique of signalling was adopted in the early 19th century and is still used in various forms today.

The colours of the flags can also be used to communicate. For example; a white flag means, among other things, surrender or peace, a red flag can be used as a warning signal, and a black flag can mean war, or determination to defeat enemies.

Orientation of a flag is also used for communication, though the practice is rarely used given modern communication systems. Raising a flag upside-down was indicative that the raising force controlled that particular area, but that it was in severe distress.

== See also ==
Lists and galleries of flags

- Gallery of sovereign state flags
- List of flag names
- Lists of flags

Notable flag-related topics

- Flag families
- False flag
- Flag Day
- Flag desecration
- Flag protocol
- Flag patch
- Flag semaphore
- Flag throwing
- Glossary of vexillology
- Pledge of Allegiance (United States)
- Standard-bearer (also enumerates various types of standards, both flag types and immobile ensigns)
- Vexillology
- Flags of the World, an Internet-based vexillological association and resource
- Windsock

== General and cited references ==
- Inglefield, Eric (1979 edition). Flags. Ward Lock, London. ISBN 0706356527
