= Lists of flags =

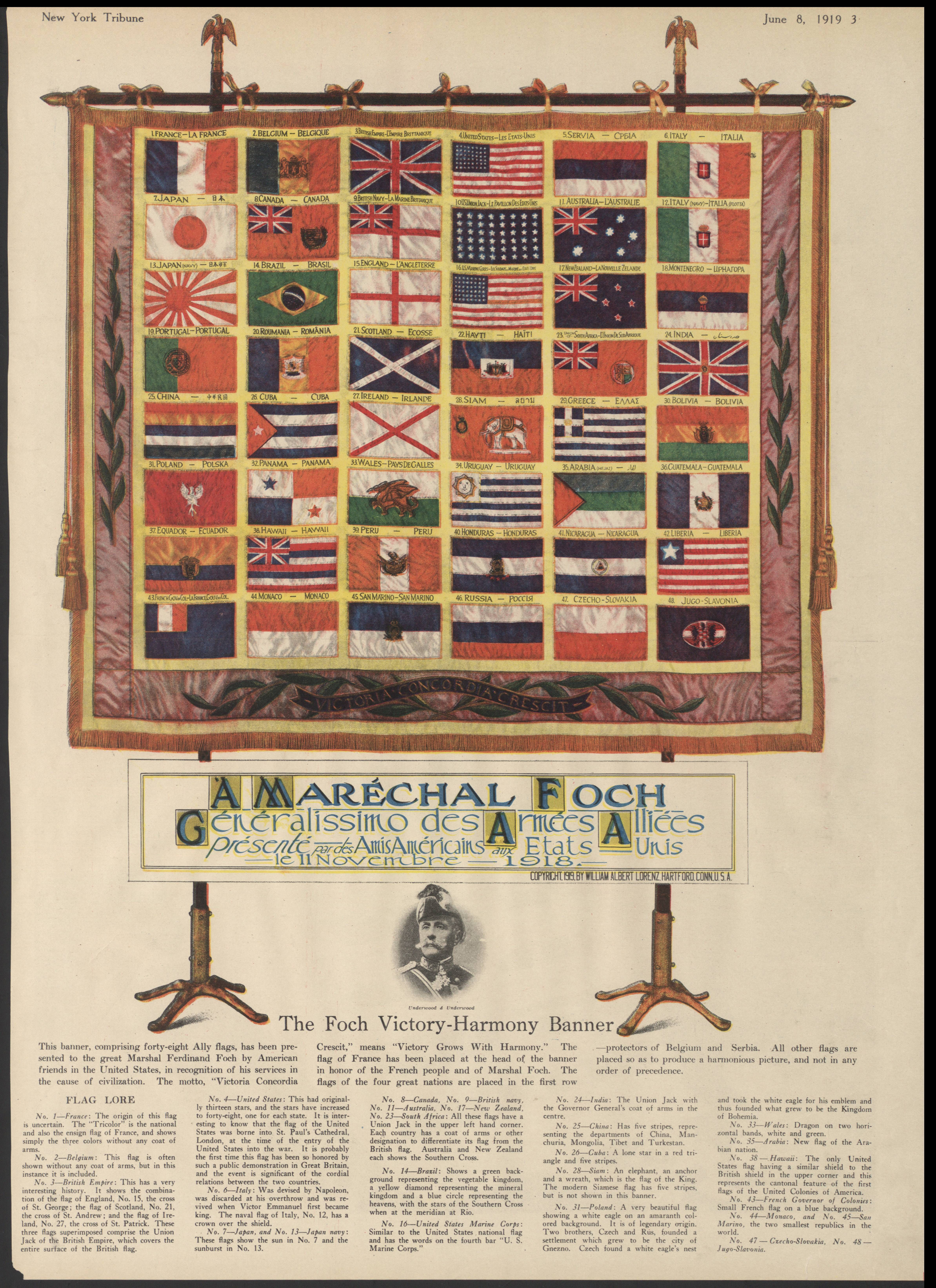
Flags of the Marshal Foch victory-harmony banner June 8, 1919

This is a collection of lists of flags, including the flags of states or territories, groups or movements and individual people. There are also lists of historical flags and military flag galleries. Many of the flag images are on Wikimedia Commons.

== In Wikipedia ==
- List of national flags of sovereign states
- Lists of country subdivision flags
- Lists of city flags
- List of flags by design
- List of national flags by design
- List of flags by color
- List of flags by color combination
- List of flag names
- Gallery of flags of dependent territories
- International maritime signal flags
- Lists of naval flags
- Flags of Asia
- Flags of Europe
- Flags of North America
- Flags of Oceania
- Flags of South America
- Flags of Africa

== In Commons ==
- Category:Flags
- Index of country subdivisions

=== States or territories ===
- Extinct states flags
- Capital city flags

=== Categories about Flags ===
- Flags by content
- Flags by country
- Flag divisions
- Flag elements
- Country subdivision flags
- Historical flags
- State flags
- State flags and ensigns
- Special and fictional flags
- Army and Ground Force flags
- Air Force Ensigns
- Border and Coast Guard Force Ensigns
- Ministry of Defense flags
- Naval Jacks
- Nautical flags
- Police Flags
- Civil air ensigns
- Civil and Merchant Navy Flags
- Pilot boat flags and ensigns
- Yacht flags and ensigns
- Flags of international organizations

=== Groups or movements ===
- Cultural and ethnic flags
- Flags of Native Americans in the United States
- Flags of Aboriginal peoples of Canada
- Flags of French-speaking people of North America
- Religious flags
- International flags
- Sexual identity symbols (including flags)
- Flags of micronations

=== Personal standards ===
- Head of state standards

=== Historical flags ===
- Historical flags
- Flags of Yugoslavia
- Soviet Republic flags
- Historical flags by country
- Historical flags of Europe
- Flags of Austria-Hungary

=== Military flag galleries ===
- Flags of the United States Armed Forces
