= Mirror image =

Reflected duplication of an object

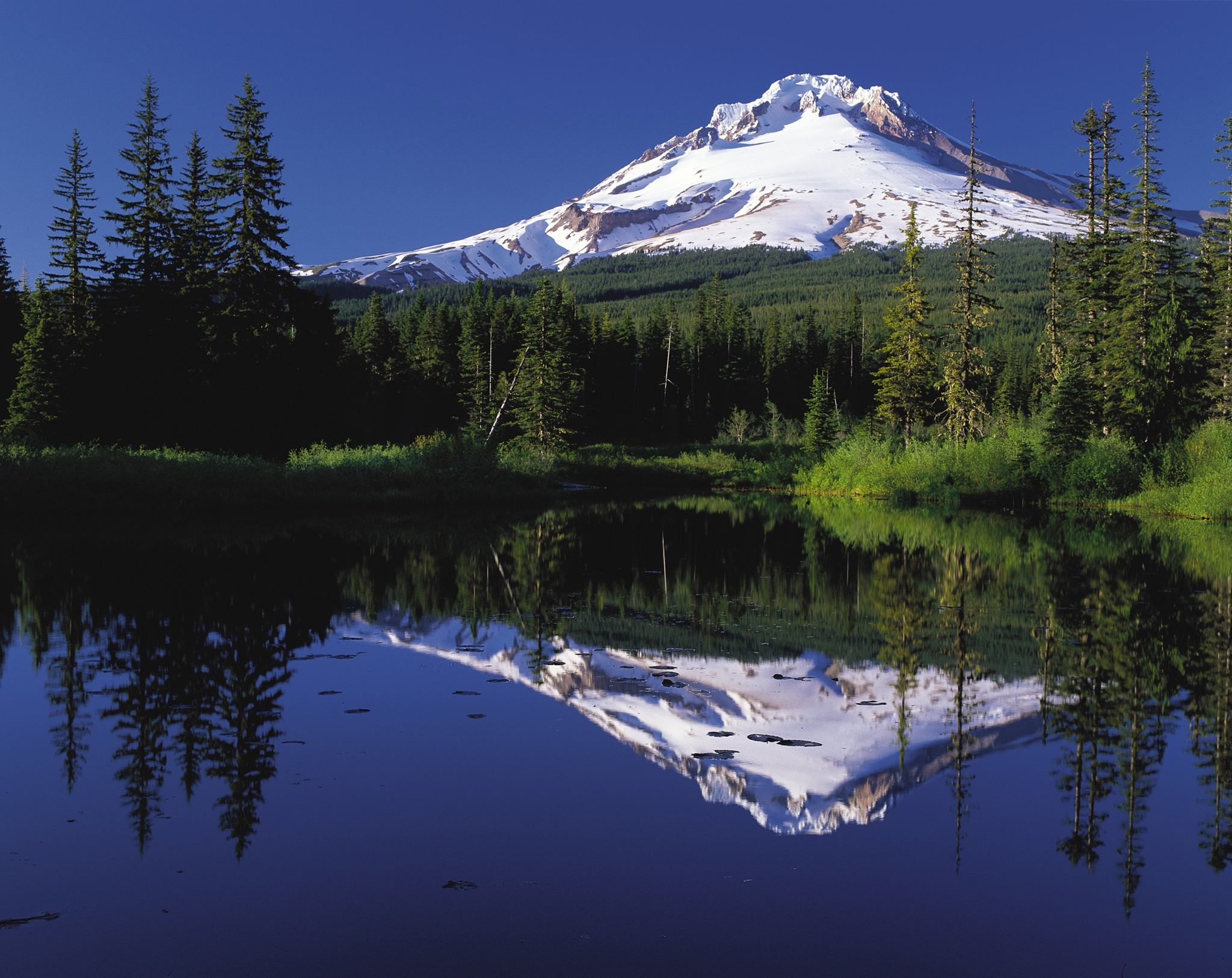
Mount Hood reflected in the waters of Mirror Lake

A mirror image (in a plane mirror) is a reflected duplication of an object that appears almost identical, but is reversed in the direction perpendicular to the mirror surface. As an optical effect, it results from specular reflection off from surfaces of lustrous materials, especially a mirror or water. It is also a concept in geometry and can be used as a conceptualization process for 3D structures.

== In geometry and geometrical optics ==
=== In two dimensions ===
In geometry, the mirror image of an object or two-dimensional figure is the virtual image formed by reflection in a plane mirror; it is of the same size as the original object, yet different, unless the object or figure has reflection symmetry (also known as a P-symmetry).

Two-dimensional mirror images can be seen in the reflections of mirrors or other reflecting surfaces, or on a printed surface seen inside-out. If we first look at an object that is effectively two-dimensional (such as the writing on a card) and then turn the card to face a mirror, the object turns through an angle of 180° and we see a left-right reversal in the mirror. In this example, it is the change in orientation rather than the mirror itself that causes the observed reversal. Another example is when we stand with our backs to the mirror and face an object that is in front of the mirror. Then we compare the object with its reflection by turning ourselves 180°, towards the mirror. Again we perceive a left-right reversal due to a change in our orientation. So, in these examples the mirror does not actually cause the observed reversals.

=== In three dimensions ===
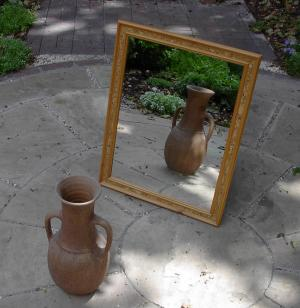
A symmetrical urn and its mirror image

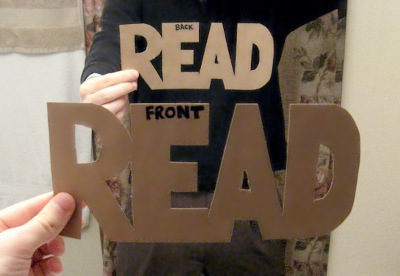
An example of how mirror flips text front to back rather than left to right. This cardboard word is reflected properly without being flipped.

The concept of reflection can be extended to three-dimensional objects, including the inside parts, even if they are not transparent. The term then relates to structural as well as visual aspects. A three-dimensional object is reversed in the direction perpendicular to the mirror surface. In physics, mirror images are investigated in the subject called geometrical optics. More fundamentally in geometry and mathematics they form the principal objects of Coxeter group theory and reflection groups.

In chemistry, two versions (isomers) of a molecule, one a "mirror image" of the other, are called enantiomers if they are not "superposable" (the correct technical term, though the term "superimposable" is also used) on each other. That is an example of chirality. In general, an object and its mirror image are called enantiomorphs.

If a point of an object has coordinates (x, y, z) then the image of this point (as reflected by a mirror in the y, z plane) has coordinates (−x, y, z). Thus reflection is a reversal of the coordinate axis perpendicular (normal) to the mirror's surface. Although a plane mirror reverses an object only in the direction normal to the mirror surface, this turns the entire three-dimensional image seen in the mirror inside-out, so there is a perception of a left-right reversal. Hence, the reversal is somewhat misleadingly called a "lateral inversion". The perception of a left-right reversal is geometrically explained by the fact that a three-dimensional object seen in a mirror is an inside-out version of the actual object, like a glove stripped off the left hand and turned into a right-hand glove, but there is still some confusion about the explanation amongst psychologists. The psychology of the perceived left-right reversal is discussed in "Much ado about mirrors" by Professor Michael Corballis (see "external links", below).

Reflection in a mirror does result in a change in chirality, more specifically from a right-handed to a left-handed coordinate system (or vice versa). If one looks in a mirror two axes (up-down and left-right) coincide with those in the mirror, but the third axis (front-back) is reversed.

If a person stands side-on to a mirror, left and right hands will be reversed directly by the mirror, because the person's left-right axis is then normal to the mirror plane. However, it is important to understand that there are always only two enantiomorphs, the object and its inside-out image. Therefore, no matter how the object is oriented towards the mirror, all the resulting images are fundamentally identical (as Corballis explains in his paper "Much ado about mirrors", mentioned above).

In the picture of the mountain reflected in the lake (photograph top right), the reversal normal to the reflecting surface is obvious. Notice that there is no obvious front-back or left-right of the mountain. In the example of the urn and mirror (photograph to right), the urn is fairly symmetrical front-back (and left-right). Thus, no obvious reversal of any sort can be seen in the mirror image of the urn.

A mirror image appears more obviously three-dimensional if the observer moves, or if the image is viewed using binocular vision. This is because the relative position of objects changes as the observer's perspective changes, or is differently viewed with each eye.

Looking through a mirror from different positions (but necessarily with the point of observation restricted to the halfspace on one side of the mirror) is like looking at the 3D mirror image of space; without further mirrors only the mirror image of the halfspace before the mirror is relevant; if there is another mirror, the mirror image of the other halfspace is too.

==== Effect of mirror on the lighting of the scene ====
A mirror does not just produce an image of what would be there without it; it also changes the light distribution in the halfspace in front of and behind the mirror. A mirror hanging on the wall makes the room brighter because additional light sources appear in the mirror image. However, the appearance of additional light does not violate the conservation of energy principle, because some light no longer reaches behind the mirror, as the mirror simply re-directs the light energy. In terms of the light distribution, the virtual mirror image has the same appearance and the same effect as a real, symmetrically arranged half-space behind a window (instead of the mirror). Shadows may extend from the mirror into the halfspace before it, and vice versa.

== Mirror writing ==
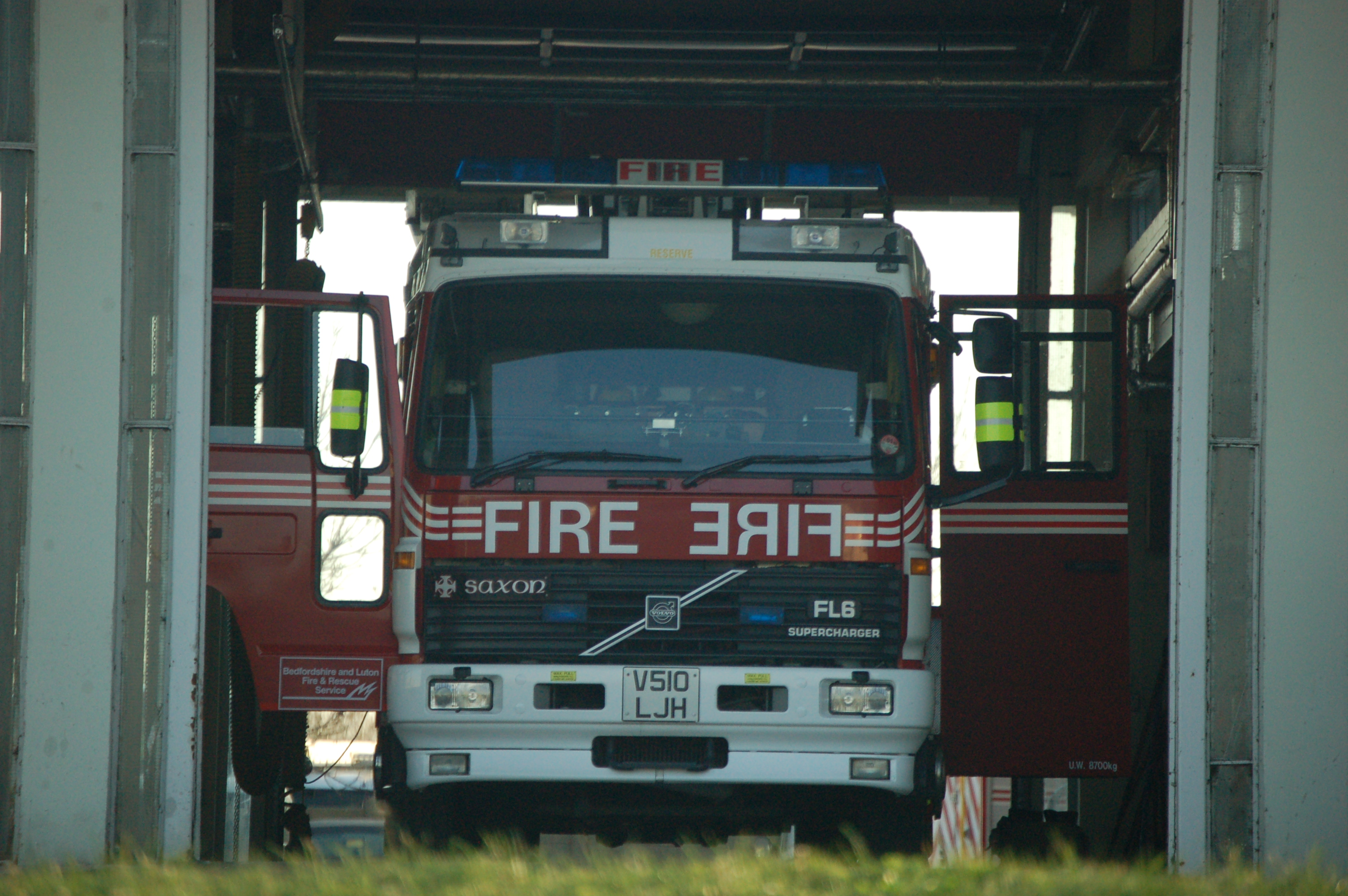
The word "FIRE" and its mirror image are displayed on the front of this fire engine.

In mirror writing a text is deliberately displayed as its mirror image, in order to be read through a mirror. For example, emergency vehicles such as ambulances or fire engines often display a label (e.g. "AMBULANCE") on their front end with the text reversed, so that drivers of vehicles in front of them can read the words right way round in the rear-view mirror. Some movie theaters also use mirror writing in a Rear Window Captioning System used to assist individuals with hearing impairments in watching films.

== Systems of mirrors ==
Comparison of the images of an ordinary mirror (left) and a non-reversing mirror made up of two mirror panes (right)

In the case of two mirrors, in planes at an angle α, looking through both from the sector which is the intersection of the two halfspaces, is like looking at a version of the world rotated by an angle of 2α; the points of observations and directions of looking for which this applies correspond to those for looking through a frame like that of the first mirror, and a frame at the mirror image with respect to the first plane, of the second mirror. If the mirrors have vertical edges then the left edge of the field of view is the plane through the right edge of the first mirror and the edge of the second mirror which is on the right when looked at directly, but on the left in the mirror image.

In the case of two parallel mirrors, looking through both at once is like looking at a version of the world which is translated by twice the distance between the mirrors, in the direction perpendicular to them, away from the observer. Since the plane of the mirror in which one looks directly is beyond that of the other mirror, one always looks at an oblique angle, and the translation just mentioned has not only a component away from the observer, but also one in a perpendicular direction. The translated view can also be described by a translation of the observer in opposite direction. For example, with a vertical periscope, the shift of the world is away from the observer and down, both by the length of the periscope, but it is more practical to consider the equivalent shift of the observer: up, and backward.

It is also possible to create a non-reversing mirror by placing two first surface mirrors at 90º to give an image which is not reversed.

== See also ==
- Anamorphosis
- Aurora § Conjugate auroras
- Chirality, a property of asymmetry important in several branches of science
- Flipped image
- Flopped image
- Handedness
- Infinity mirror
- Kaleidoscope
- Plane mirror
- Relative direction
