= Flopped image =

Horizontally-flipped image

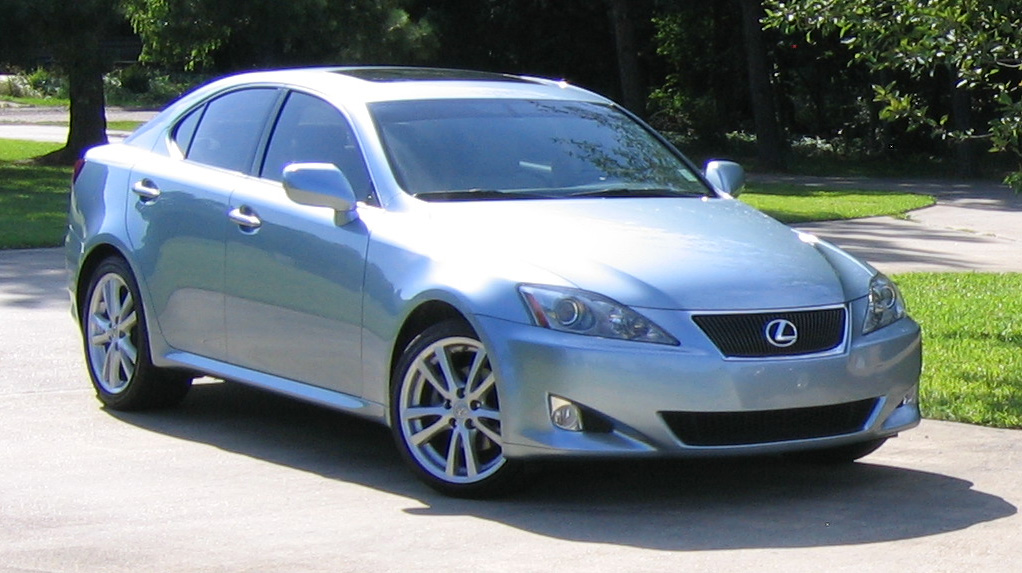
Original image of a left-hand-drive Lexus IS 250

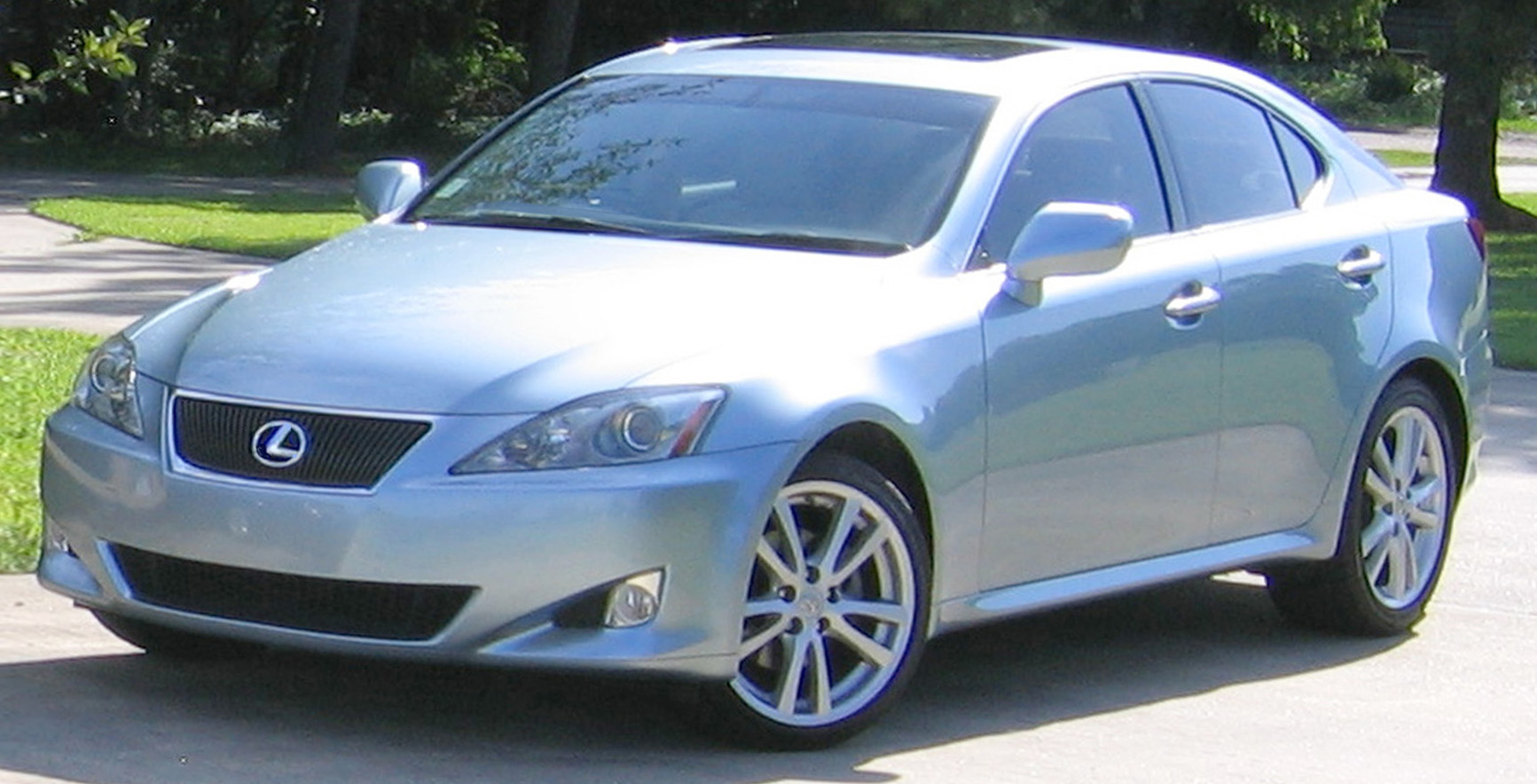
Flopped and cropped image with badge restored

In photography and graphic arts a flopped image is a static or moving image that is generated by a reversal of an original image across a vertical axis, as in a conventional mirror image. This is opposed to a flipped image, which means an image reversed across a horizontal axis. Flopping can be used to improve the subjective aesthetic appeal of the image in question.

== Use in advertising ==
There are two main uses in advertising, one practical, and one subjective. On a practical level, images of cars are often flopped to ensure cars look appropriate for left-hand-drive or right-hand-drive markets. This allows the results of a single production shoot to be used across markets, allowing a cost saving. On a subjective level, the direction in which a person is looking or a car appears to be travelling may be regarded as important. When placing a picture on a page of text, it is usual for depictions of people to face into the text, rather than off the page; thus, when compositing a page, a picture may be flopped so it may be placed either side of a column of text.

== Use in art ==
Cultural considerations come into play — a picture of a person eating with their left hand may be flopped for publication in a Muslim publication, due to the strong taboo against eating with the left hand in Muslim society. Similarly, Vincent van Gogh took the trouble to etch some of his originals in mirror-reversed form so that when printed, people in the image would appear, correctly, as right-handed.

An example of flopping is the use of Joseph Edward Southall's painting Fishermen and Boat as part of the art associated with Kate Bush's album Aerial. The picture is flopped, and the name "AERIAL" added to the boat.

== In moviemaking ==
Flopped images are common movie bloopers, usually called "flipped images" contrary to the technical usage of that term. Flopped images are common because they can be used to correct continuity errors between shots and are hard to see without extensive examination. Examples of these can be found on several movie blooper sites.

In the production of the James Cameron film Titanic, only one side of the ship was built, and the boarding scenes at Southampton Pier which required the other side of the ship were shot flopped. Costumes, signage and hairstyles were all reversed left-to-right on set so that the footage could be mirrored afterwards. Kate Winslet recalls being amused to see "sailors with 'ENIL RATS ETIHW' written across their hats" on set.

== Accidental ==
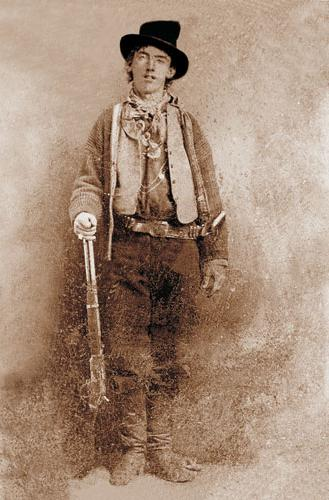
Billy the Kid. (Flopped tintype photo)

One of the most famous flopped images is this picture of Billy the Kid carrying a Model 1873 Winchester rifle and a pistol belt with the pistol on his left. This led people to believe he was left-handed, but it was later revealed to be a flopped image due to the cartridge loading gate on the rifle being on the wrong side.
