= Flipped image =

Vertically mirror-reversed image

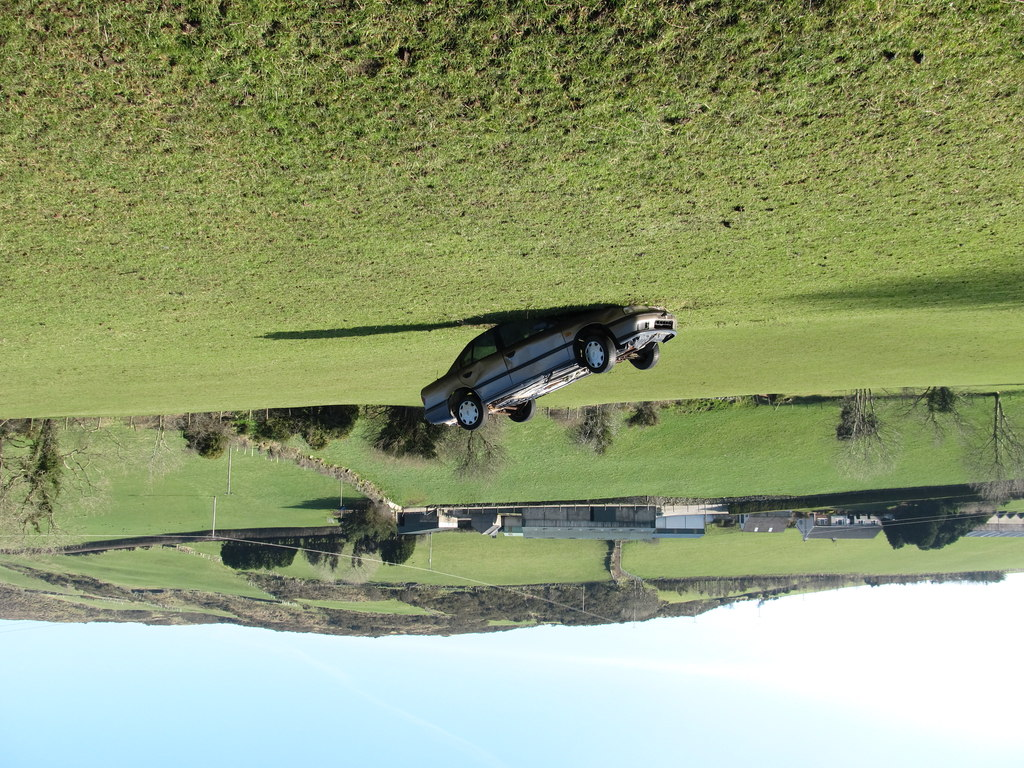
A flipped photograph of an abandoned car in County Down, Northern Ireland

A flipped image is a static or moving image that is generated by a mirror-reversal of an original across a horizontal axis, making the image upside-down. In contrast, a flopped image is mirrored across the vertical axis, as in a conventional mirror image.

== Photography ==
Many large format cameras present the image of the scene being photographed as a flipped image through their viewfinders. Some photographers regard this as a beneficial feature, as the unfamiliarity of the format allows them to compose the elements of the picture properly without being distracted by the actual contents of the scene. The technique is meant to bypass or override the brain's visual processing which normally sees what is expected rather than what is there.

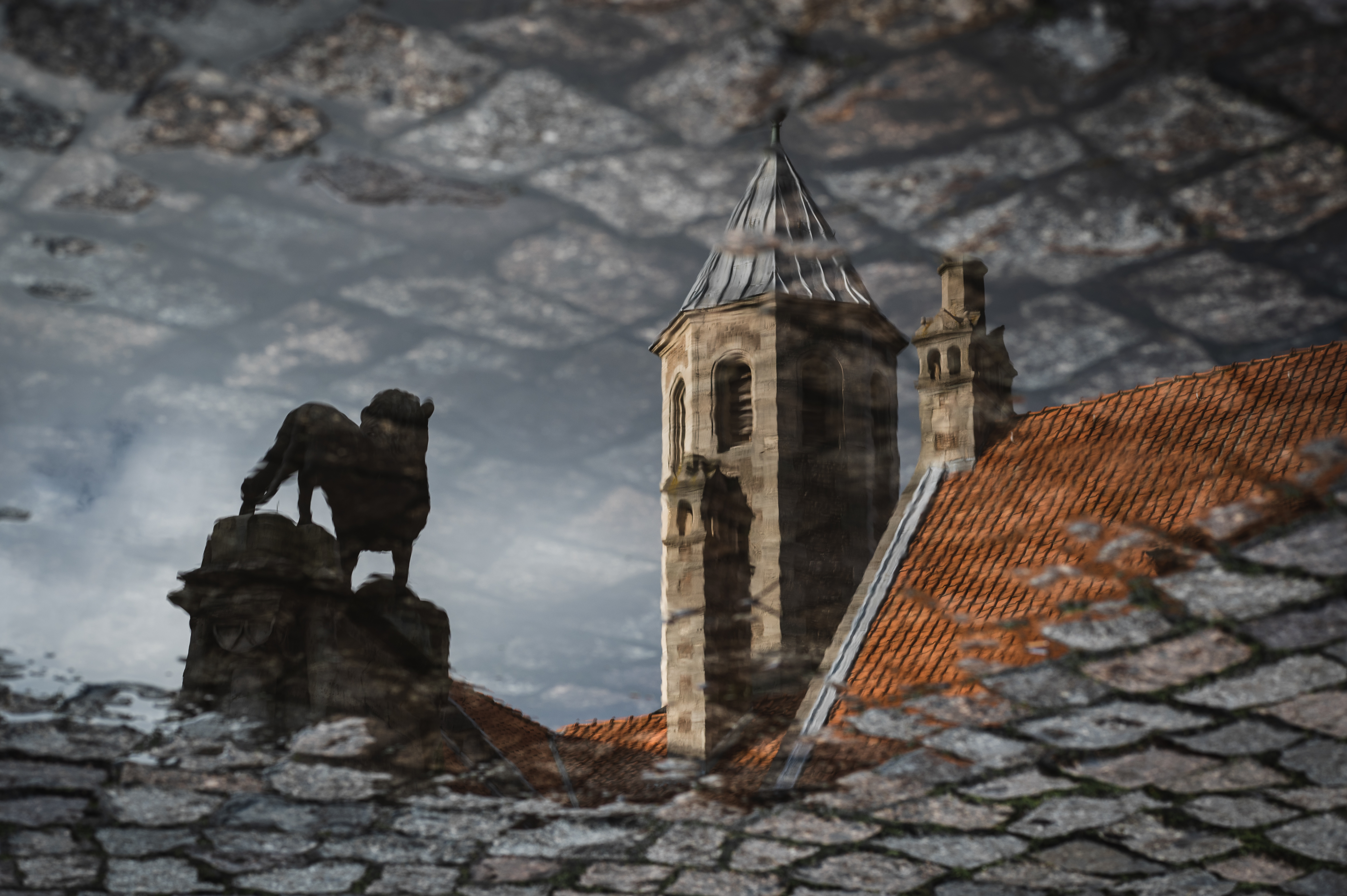
Flipped photograph of Dankwarderode Castle reflected in a puddle of water

Flipping is occasionally used as a trompe-l'œil effect in scenes which incorporate reflections in a body of water. The image is deliberately inverted so that people slowly discern that something is 'not quite right' with the picture, and come to notice that it is upside down.
