= Rear Window Captioning System =

Film captioning system

The Rear Window Captioning System

The Rear Window Captioning System (RWC) is a method for presenting, through captions, a transcript of the audio portion of a film in theatres for deaf and hard-of-hearing people. The system was co-developed by WGBH and Rufus Butler Seder.

On the way into the theatre, viewers pick up a reflective plastic panel mounted on a flexible stalk. The panel sits in a seat cupholder or on the floor adjacent to the seat. A large LED display is mounted on a rear wall that displays caption characters in mirror image. Viewers move the panels into position (usually below the movie screen) so they can read the reflected captions and watch the movie. It is sometimes necessary to sit in a certain area of the theater to obtain the best angle for reflecting the backward text emitted from the back of the theater on the panel while also being able to view the movie at the same time.

Through this method, all screenings of a film can be accessible to caption viewers. Others seated alongside do not watch, or usually even see, the captions.

Rear Window captioning is an alternative to open captioning, in which text is permanently visible. Open captioning has been little-used due to the fear that it was too intrusive and noticeable to hearing viewers. However, no studies have been conducted to elicit hearing people's opinions on how they will adapt to reading captions on screen. Rear Window captioning is a form of closed captioning because the viewer must choose to view the captions.

Illustrated Example of a Rear Window Captioning System

Few movie exhibitors or theater chains choose to provide Rear Window captioning. One of the reasons often stated for not providing Rear Window captioning is the cost of the hardware (as of 2011, approximately US $4,500 per screen for a single installation, less for multiple installations in a multiplex). The cost of captioning a film is on the order of US$4,000 (about $40 per minute).

For blind viewers, audio description (Descriptive Video Service, DVS) can be and usually is transmitted along with captions. Viewers listen to the descriptions via Wireless headsets.

In the Rear Window system, the film print is unaffected. With the transition to Digital Cinema, closed captions are included in many digital cinema packages.

In many movie advertisements by a specific cinema, the "RWC" acronym is often used, much like the CC acronym is used to indicate the availability of closed captions on television shows. Often, "RWC/DVS" notation is used, indicating the availability of both Rear Window Captioning and Descriptive Video Service.
