= Non-reversing mirror =

Mirror that shows a non-reversed image

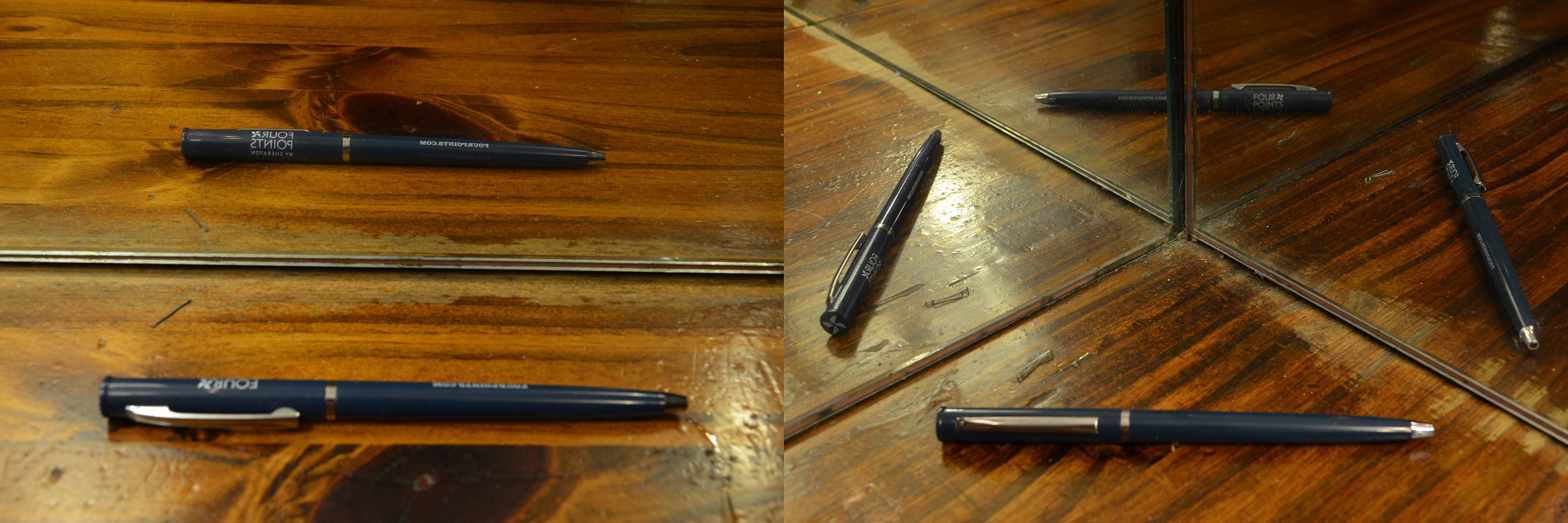
Comparison of reflections of a pen in an ordinary mirror (left) and two perpendicular mirrors forming the first type of non-reversing mirror (right). The latter also illustrates the visible line in the middle if measures are not taken to minimise it.

A non-reversing mirror (sometimes referred to as a flip mirror or a true mirror) is a mirror that presents its subject as it would be seen from the mirror.

== Types ==
Comparison of the images of an ordinary mirror (left) and a non-reversing mirror made up of two mirror panes (right)

A non-reversing mirror can be made by connecting two regular mirrors at their edges at a 90° angle. If the joint is positioned so that it is vertical, an observer sees a non-reversed image when looking into the angle where the two mirrors meet. With this type of non-reversing mirror, the line at the juncture of the two mirrors is usually visible, interrupting the image.

First-surface mirrors set at an angle of 90° can be made with an almost invisible joint. The Museum of Illusions presents a mirror of this kind as an "antigravity mirror". As the mirror assembly rotates once around the line-of-sight axis, the reflected image rotates twice, appearing upside-down when the joint is horizontal.

Another type of non-reversing mirror can be made by making the mirror concave (curved inward like a bowl). At a certain distance from the mirror an inverted non-reversed image appears.

A third type of non-reversing mirror was created by mathematics professor R. Andrew Hicks in 2009. It was created using computer algorithms to generate a "disco ball" like surface. The thousands of tiny mirrors are angled to create a surface that curves and bends in different directions. The curves direct rays from an object across the mirror's face before sending them back to the viewer, flipping the conventional mirror image.

A patent for a non-reversing mirror was issued to John Joseph Hooker in 1887.

== See also ==
- Corner reflector
- Retroreflector
