= First-surface mirror =

Type of mirror

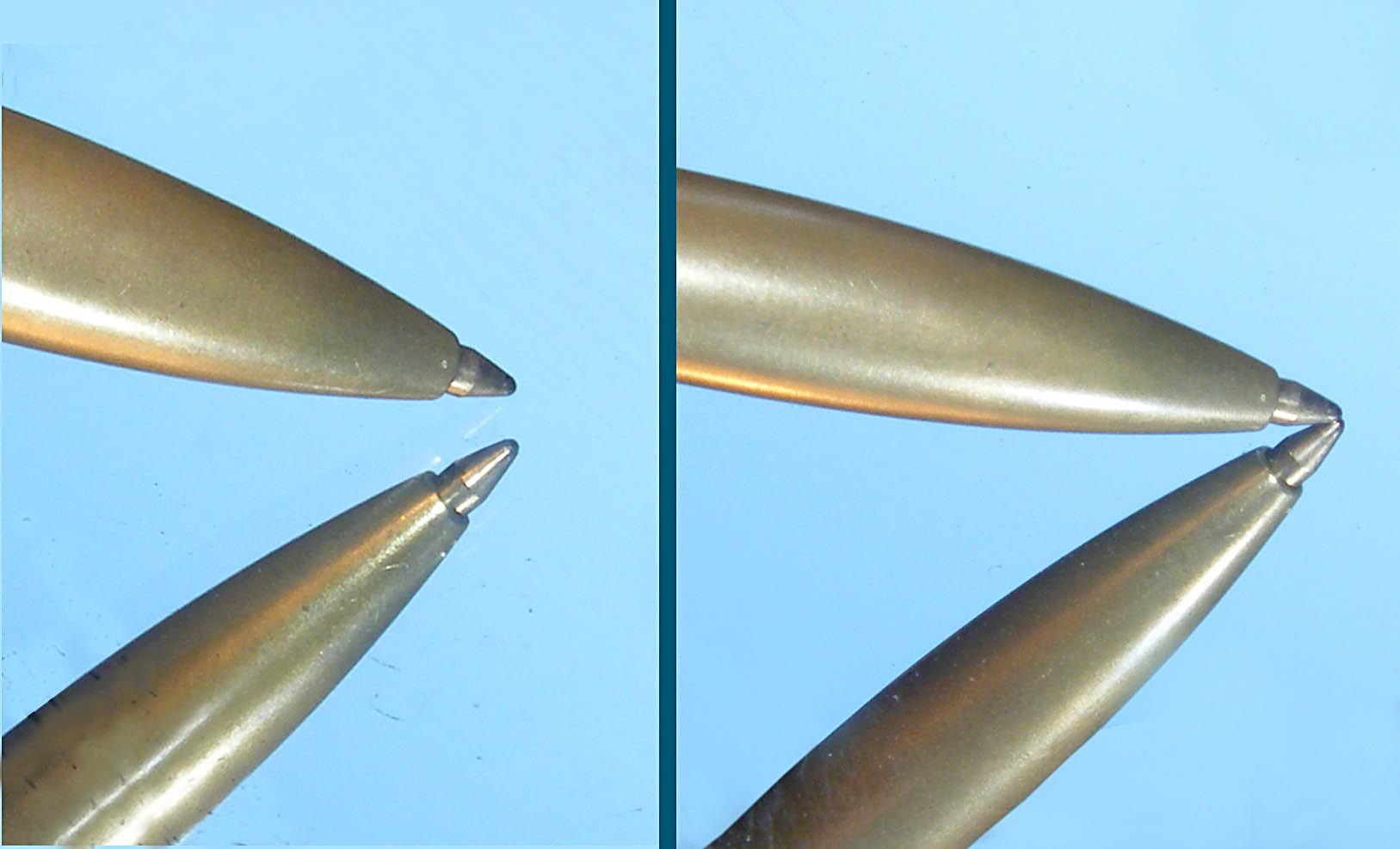
Example of a second-surface mirror (left) and a first-surface mirror (right). In both pictures, the pen is touching the surface of the mirror. "Ghosting" (a faint reflection from the first layer) is visible in the left image (more obvious when this file is displayed at full-size).

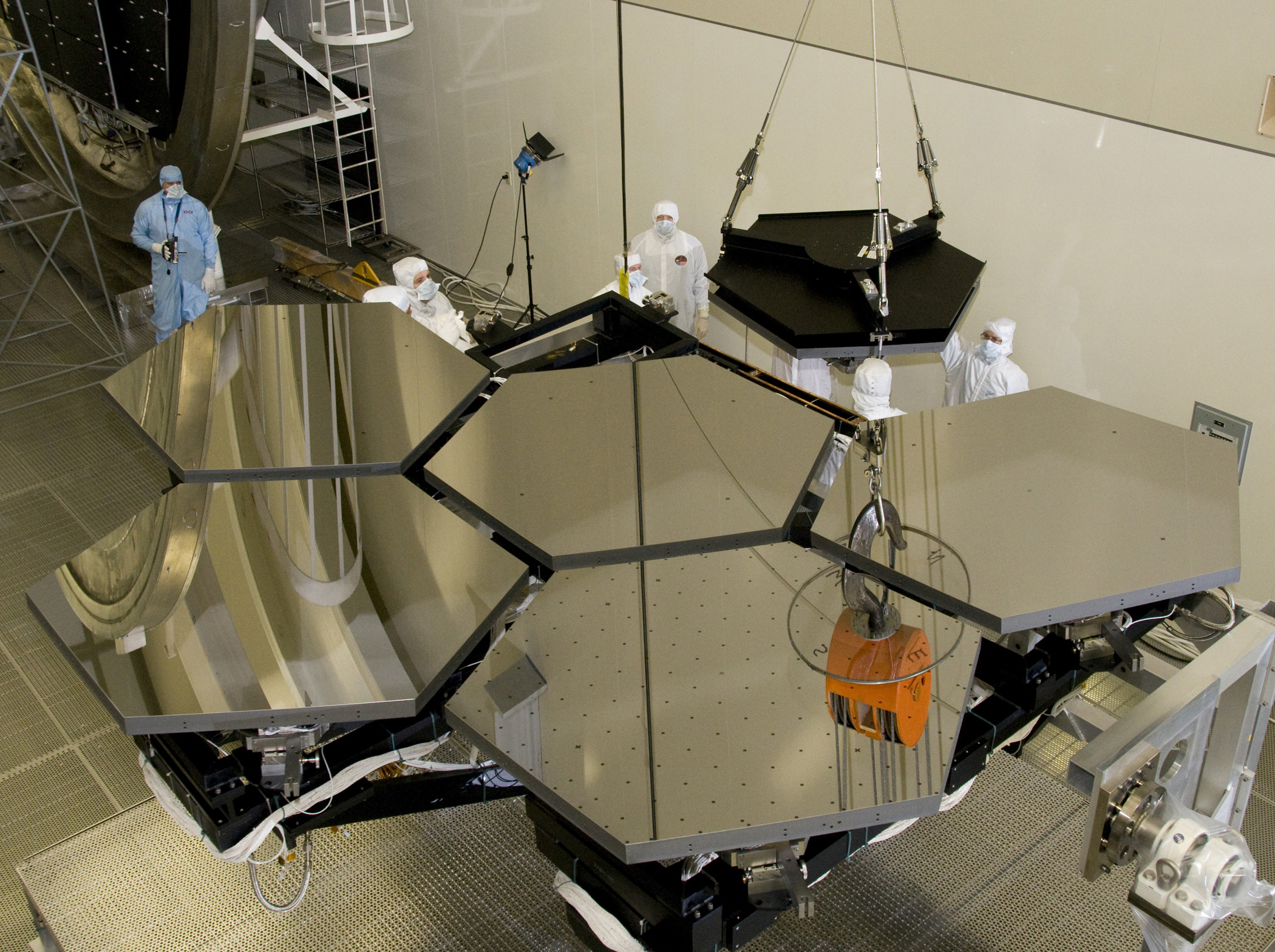
Technicians assemble 6 of the 18 first-surface mirrors used in the James Webb Space Telescope.

A first-surface mirror or front-surface mirror (also commonly abbreviated FS mirror or FSM) is a mirror with the reflective surface being above a backing, as opposed to the conventional, second-surface mirror with the reflective surface behind a transparent substrate such as glass or acrylic.

Historically, the bronze mirror, an FSM type, was standard from ancient times until relatively recent centuries. These were simply highly polished pieces of bronze or other metals, usually small and round, and designed for a person to see their face.

First-surface mirrors are now made for applications requiring a strict reflection without a ghosting effect as seen with a second-surface mirror, where a faint secondary reflection could be observed, coming from the front surface of the glass. This includes most optics applications where light is being manipulated in a specific manner. Reflecting telescopes, rear-projection televisions, periscopes, non-reversing mirrors, high-quality kaleidoscopes, and the animation process.

In cases where the mirror is subjected to extreme cold (as low as 33 K as in the James Webb Space Telescope), a polished pure beryllium mirror is used without a first-surface coating in order to eliminate deformations caused by differing coefficients of thermal expansion.

First-surface mirrors are more sensitive than back-surface mirrors and may be damaged by cleaning as the reflective surface is not protected by glass.

== Silvering ==
The "silvering" on a front-surface mirror is usually aluminium for visible light and gold for infrared radiation.

== See also ==
- Speculum metal
