= List of flag names =

This is a list of flag names and nicknames, including both official designations and widely used informal names. Entries are presented in a sortable table by flag name; where given, the “Meaning and notes” column provides translations, explanations, and other contextual information.

== List ==
Flag name / nickname	Country / territory	Meaning and notes
A Auriverde	Brazil	"The Gold and Green"
Aappalaartoq	Greenland	"The red"
Al-Adaam	Qatar	"Support flag"
Alam Baladii	Kuwait	"My country's flag"
Alay Rengîn	Iraqi Kurdistan	"Colourful flag"
Albayrak	Turkey	"Red Flag"
Alsancak	Turkey	"Holy Red Standard"
Ay Yıldız	Turkey	"Crescent Star"
La Albiceleste or La Celeste y Blanca	Argentina	"The white and light blue one"
A'najmataynee	United Arab Republic and Ba'athist Syria	"The Two Stars"
Bandeira Auriverde	Brazil	"Gold and green flag"
Bandeira das Quinas	Portugal	"Flag of the quinas", the five blue shields of the Portuguese arms
Bandeira Verde-Rubra	Portugal	"Green-Red Flag"
Baner Dewi Sant	Wales (unofficial flag)	"Flag of Saint David"
Baner Peran	Cornwall	"St. Piran's flag"
Bear Flag	California	
Bendera Merah-Putih	Indonesia	"Red-White Flag"
Betsy Ross flag	United States	
Bhagwa	Flag of the Hindus and former flag of the Maratha Empire	"The Saffron Banner"
Biało-Czerwona	Poland	"White-Red"
Bieł-Čyrvona-Bieły	Belarus (formerly)	"White-Red-White"
Bindenschild	Austria	
Black, green and gold	Jamaica	
Blood-Stained Banner	Confederate States	
Bo Najma w Hlal	Libya	"Flag of the Star and the Crescent"
Bonnie Blue flag	Republic of West Florida	official flag of the now-defunct Republic of West Florida, also used in some places as an unofficial banner of the Confederate States.
Bosanski Ljiljan	Bosnia and Herzegovina (formerly)	"Bosnian lily"
Bratach-Croise	Scotland	"Saltire"
The Broken Trident	Barbados	
Bundesflagge	Germany	"Federal Flag", Germany, official designation
Български трикольор/Balgarski Trikolyor	Bulgaria	"Bulgarian Three Colors"
Circle of Stars	European Union and the Council of Europe	
Commonwealth Blue Ensign	Australia	
Cambridge flag	United States (historical)	
Continental colours	United Colonies	
Continental Union	United Colonies	
Cờ đỏ sao vàng	Vietnam	"Red Flag and Yellow Star"
Cờ tổ quốc	Vietnam	"Flag of Fatherland"
Crois Naomh Anndra	Scotland	"St. Andrew's Cross"
Crotz occitana	Occitania	"Occitan cross"
The Cross	Jamaica	
Dannebrog	Denmark	"Danish cloth"
Derti	Kuwait	"My Nation/Land"
Erfalasorput	Greenland	"Our flag"
La Estrella Solitaria	Chile	"The Lone Star"
La Estrella Solitaria	Cuba	"The Lone Star"
Estelada blava	Catalonia (pro-independence)	"Blue-Starred Flag"
Estreleira	Galician nationalism	"Starred Flag"
Eureka Flag	Australia (historical)	
Five Coloured Flag	Jain flag	
Fleurdelisé	Quebec, Canada	"Fleur-de-lis-y"
Galanólefki (Γαλανόλευκη)	Greece	"Blue-and-White"
Gems	Saint Vincent and the Grenadines	
Golden Arrowhead	Guyana	
Gwenn-ha-du	Brittany	"White and black"
Grand Ol' Flag	United States	
Grand Union flag	United States (historical)	
Hinomaru 日の丸	Japan (national flag and naval flag)	"Sun disc"
黃龍旗 (Huánglóngqí)	China (historical)	"Yellow Dragon Flag"
Hvítbláinn	Iceland (historical)	"The White-blue", a flag proposal which was used but never became official
Имперка (Imperka)	Russian Empire (historical flag)	"Imperial flag"
Jackson Flag	Confederate States	
Jalur Gemilang	Malaysia	"Stripes of Glory"
Jefferson Seal Flag	Jefferson (proposed U.S. state)	
	Hawaii (alternative flag)	"True People"
Kaponga (silver fern)	New Zealand (unofficial, widely used)	
Khanjar Oo Sayfain	Oman	"Dagger and two swords"
Khutjvriani Drosha	Georgia	"Five-cross flag"
Красное знамя (Krasnoye znamia)	Soviet Union (historical flag)	"Red Banner"
Kök Bayraq	East Turkestan	"Blue Banner"
Flag of Kenya	Kenya	"Black, white, red, white, green and a shield with two arrows"
Lal-Sobuj, Lal-Sobuj er Nishan	Bangladesh	"Red & green"
Leòmhann na h-Alba (Lion Rampant)	Scotland (royal banner)	"Lion Rampant"
Lone Star Flag	Texas	
Lion Flag	Sri Lanka	
Maple Leaf or l'Unifolié	Canada	
Merkið	Faroe Islands	"The Banner"
Merah-Putih	Indonesia	"Red and White"
Monoestrellada	Puerto Rico	"Monostarred"
Native America's flag	Oklahoma	
Nishan Sahib	x	"respected ensign"
Old Glory	United States	
Pabellón Nacional	Uruguay	"National Pavilionflag"
Pahāḍa	Nepal	"Mountain"
Parcham-e Serang	Iran	"The Three-Coloured Flag"
Parchem e Sitāra o Hilāl	Pakistan	"Flag of the Star and the Crescent"
Prinsenvlag	Netherlands (historical)	"Prince's flag"
Piros-fehér-zöld	Hungary	"Red-White-Green"
Pambansang Watawat	Philippines	"National Flag"
青天、白日、滿地紅 (Qīng Tiān, Bái Rì, Mǎn Dì Hóng ["Blue Sky, White Sun, Red Field"])	Taiwan	
The Rainbow Flag, Unity Flag, or Interim Flag	South Africa	all unofficial
Rainbow flag	x	there are several independent rainbow flags in use today, the most widely known worldwide is the pride flag representing gay pride, while the peace flag is especially popular in Italy and the cooperative flag symbolizes the international co-operative movement.
Red, White and Blue	United States	
Ramhongsaek Konghwagukgi	North Korea	"Indigo and Red Flag of the Republic"
Red Ensign or Red Duster	United Kingdom (civil ensign)	the civil ensign of the United Kingdom
Reial senyera	Valencian Community	"Royal flag"
Reichs- und Nationalflagge	Germany (historical)	"Reich and National Flag"
Российский триколор (Rosiiski Trikolor)	Russia	"Russian Three Colours"
Rojigualda	Spain	"Red-weld"
Rot-Weiss-Rot	Austria	"Red-white-red"
De Roude Léiw	Luxembourg (civil ensign)	"Red Lion"
Rout-Wäiss-Blo	Luxembourg	"Red-White-Blue"
Ручнік (Ručnik)	Belarus	
Rødt, hvitt og blått (Red, white and blue)	Norway	
Sabz Hilāli Parchem	Pakistan	"Green Flag with Crescent"
Saint Andrew's Cross or The Saltire	Scotland	
Saint George's Cross	England	
San Paul's Flag	Devon	
Sam Si	Laos	"Tricolor"
Sarkanbaltsarkanais karogs	Latvia	"Red-white-red flag"
Sang Saka Merah Putih	Indonesia	"The Red White Heritage"
Ѕвездата од Кутлеш	Republic of North Macedonia (formerly Republic of Macedonia) (historical flag)	"Sun of Kutleš'
Schwarz-Rot-Gold	Germany	"Black-red-gold"
Schwarz-Weiß-Rot	German Empire	"Black-white-red"
Senyera	Catalonia	
Shir-o-Khorshid	Iran (historical flag)	'The lion and the sun"
Shqiponja Dykrenare	Albania	"The two-headed eagle"
Sinimustvalge	Estonia	"Blue-black-white"
Siniristilippu	Finland	"Blue Cross Flag"
Sinha Flag	Sri Lanka	"Lion Flag"
Snow lion flag	Tibet	
Southern Cross	Confederate States (other meanings)	
Southern Cross Flag	Australia	
Southern Cross Flag	New Zealand	
Stainless Banner	Confederate States	
Stars and Bars	Confederate States	
Stars and Stripes	United States	
Star-Spangled Banner, (Note: Originally referred to the version of the U.S. flag in use from 1795 to 1818; now often used to refer to all U.S. flags.)	United States	
Sun-Sea-Sand Banner	Trinidad and Tobago	
Taegeukgi	South Korea	
Taliban Flag	Afghanistan	White flag used by the Taliban-led Islamic Emirate of Afghanistan, bearing the shahada.
Tatlong Bituin at Isang Araw	Philippines	"Three Stars and a Sun"
Al Tawheed/Shahada	Saudi Arabia	
Te Kara	New Zealand (formerly)	Flag of the United Tribes of New Zealand
Tino Rangatiratanga	New Zealand (national Māori flag)	"Absolute Sovereignty"
Tiranga	India	"The Tricolour"
Tjúgufáni	Iceland	
Trairong	Thailand	"Tricolour"
Tree Cassyn Vannin	Isle of Man	"Three Legs of Mann"
La Tricolor	Bolivia	"The Tricolor"
El Tricolor Nacional	Colombia	"The National Tricolor"
La Tricolor	Costa Rica	
Trobojnica	Croatia	"The Tricolor"
La Tricolor	Ecuador	
Tricolor Nacional	Venezuela	"National Tricolour"
La Tricolor	Spain (historical)	
Drapeau Tricolore	France	"Tricolour Flag"
Il Tricolore	Italy	
Tricolorul	Romania	"the Tricolour"
Триколор (Trikolor)	Russia	
Тробојка / Trobojka	Serbia	
Trídhathach na hÉireann	Ireland	"Irish tricolour"
Trinacria	Sicily	
Trispalvė	Lithuania	"Tricolor"
True South	Antarctica	
Üçrəngli Bayraq	Azerbaijan	"Tricolour Flag"
Unifolié	Canada	"The [one] with a single Leaf"
L'Union Fait La Force	Haiti	"Unity makes strength" (motto on the flag)
Union Jack or Union Flag, (Note: Called the "Royal Union Flag" in Canada, a former colony of the United Kingdom.)	United Kingdom	
Union Jack	United States (maritime jack)	
Wiphala	Bolivia (co-official flag)	a flag representing the native peoples of the Andes and the co-official flag of Bolivia
五色旗 (Wǔsèqí)	Republic of China (historical)	"Five-Colored Flag"
五星红旗 (Wǔ Xīng Hóng Qí)	People's Republic of China	"Five-Starred Red Flag"
Y Ddraig Goch	Wales	"The Red Dragon"
Եռագույն (Yerakooyn)	Armenia	"Tricolour"
жовто-блакитний (прапор) (Zhovto-blakytnyy [prapor])	Ukraine	"Yellow-blue [flag]"
