= Malawi at the 2025 World Aquatics Championships =

- Flag of Malawi
- World Aquatics code: MAW
- National federation: Malawi Aquatic Union

in Singapore
- Competitors: 3 in 1 sport
- Medals: Gold 0 Silver 0 Bronze 0 Total 0

World Aquatics Championships appearances
- 1973; 1975; 1978; 1982; 1986; 1991; 1994; 1998; 2001; 2003; 2005; 2007; 2009; 2011; 2013; 2015; 2017; 2019; 2022; 2023; 2024; 2025

Malawi will compete at the 2025 World Aquatics Championships in Singapore from July 11 to August 3, 2025.

== Swimming ==
Malawian swimmers have achieved qualifying standards in the following events.

Men

Athlete	Event	Heat		Semifinal		Final	
Athlete	Event	Time	Rank	Time	Rank	Time	Rank
Asher Banda	50 m freestyle	25.92	94	Did not advance			
Asher Banda	50 m butterfly	28.71	91	Did not advance			
Luka Smit	100 m freestyle	54.16	81	Did not advance			
Luka Smit	50 m breaststroke	29.98	56	Did not advance			

Women

Athlete	Event	Heat		Semifinal		Final	
Athlete	Event	Time	Rank	Time	Rank	Time	Rank
Tayamika Chang'anamuno	100 m freestyle	1:11.09	80	Did not advance			
Tayamika Chang'anamuno	50 m butterfly	DNS					
