= Regional indicator symbol =

Set of alphabetic symbols that allow for special handling

The regional indicator symbols are a set of 26 alphabetic Unicode characters (A–Z) intended to be used to encode ISO 3166-1 alpha-2 two-letter country codes in a way that allows optional special treatment.

These were defined by October 2010 as part of the Unicode 6.0 support for emoji, as an alternative to encoding separate characters for each country flag. Although they can be displayed as Roman letters, it is intended that implementations may choose to display them in other ways, such as by using national flags. The Unicode FAQ indicates that this mechanism should be used and that symbols for national flags will not be directly encoded. This allows the Unicode consortium to avoid any issues surrounding which countries to include (and, de facto, recognize), instead leaving it entirely to the system implementation as to which flags to include (see: partially recognized state).

They are encoded in the range U+1F1E6 🇦 REGIONAL INDICATOR SYMBOL LETTER A to U+1F1FF 🇿 REGIONAL INDICATOR SYMBOL LETTER Z within the Enclosed Alphanumeric Supplement block in the Supplementary Multilingual Plane.

== Emoji flag sequences ==
A pair of regional indicator symbols is referred to as an emoji flag sequence (although it represents a specific region, not a specific flag for that region).

Out of the 676 possible pairs of regional indicator symbols (26 × 26), only 270 are considered valid Unicode region codes. These are a subset of the region sequences in the Common Locale Data Repository (CLDR):

- All 256 regular region sequences in the CLDR
  - 249 officially assigned ISO 3166-1 alpha-2 codes
  - 6 exceptional reservations (Ascension Island, Clipperton Island, Diego Garcia, Ceuta and Melilla, Canary Islands, and Tristan da Cunha)
  - 1 user-assigned temporary country code (Kosovo)
- Two of the 35 macroregion sequences in the CLDR (EU and UN)
- All 12 deprecated region sequences in the CLDR (strongly discouraged—intended for backward compatibility only)

List of current emoji flag sequences
| flag | code | region | possible rendering | alternate possible rendering |
|---|---|---|---|---|
| 🇦🇨 | AC | Ascension Island | | |
| 🇦🇩 | AD | Andorra | | |
| 🇦🇪 | AE | United Arab Emirates | | |
| 🇦🇫 | AF | Afghanistan | | |
| 🇦🇬 | AG | Antigua & Barbuda | | |
| 🇦🇮 | AI | Anguilla | | |
| 🇦🇱 | AL | Albania | | |
| 🇦🇲 | AM | Armenia | | |
| 🇦🇴 | AO | Angola | | |
| 🇦🇶 | AQ | Antarctica | | |
| 🇦🇷 | AR | Argentina | | |
| 🇦🇸 | AS | American Samoa | | |
| 🇦🇹 | AT | Austria | | |
| 🇦🇺 | AU | Australia | | |
| 🇦🇼 | AW | Aruba | | |
| 🇦🇽 | AX | Åland Islands | | |
| 🇦🇿 | AZ | Azerbaijan | | |
| 🇧🇦 | BA | Bosnia & Herzegovina | | |
| 🇧🇧 | BB | Barbados | | |
| 🇧🇩 | BD | Bangladesh | | |
| 🇧🇪 | BE | Belgium | | |
| 🇧🇫 | BF | Burkina Faso | | |
| 🇧🇬 | BG | Bulgaria | | |
| 🇧🇭 | BH | Bahrain | | |
| 🇧🇮 | BI | Burundi | | |
| 🇧🇯 | BJ | Benin | | |
| 🇧🇱 | BL | St. Barthélemy | | |
| 🇧🇲 | BM | Bermuda | | |
| 🇧🇳 | BN | Brunei | | |
| 🇧🇴 | BO | Bolivia | | |
| 🇧🇶 | BQ | Caribbean Netherlands | | |
| 🇧🇷 | BR | Brazil | | |
| 🇧🇸 | BS | Bahamas | | |
| 🇧🇹 | BT | Bhutan | | |
| 🇧🇻 | BV | Bouvet Island | | |
| 🇧🇼 | BW | Botswana | | |
| 🇧🇾 | BY | Belarus | | |
| 🇧🇿 | BZ | Belize | | |
| 🇨🇦 | CA | Canada | | |
| 🇨🇨 | CC | Cocos (Keeling) Islands | | |
| 🇨🇩 | CD | Congo-Kinshasa | | |
| 🇨🇫 | CF | Central African Republic | | |
| 🇨🇬 | CG | Congo-Brazzaville | | |
| 🇨🇭 | CH | Switzerland | | |
| 🇨🇮 | CI | Côte d'Ivoire | | |
| 🇨🇰 | CK | Cook Islands | | |
| 🇨🇱 | CL | Chile | | |
| 🇨🇲 | CM | Cameroon | | |
| 🇨🇳 | CN | China | | |
| 🇨🇴 | CO | Colombia | | |
| 🇨🇵 | CP | Clipperton Island | | |
| 🇨🇶 | CQ | Sark | | |
| 🇨🇷 | CR | Costa Rica | | |
| 🇨🇺 | CU | Cuba | | |
| 🇨🇻 | CV | Cape Verde | | |
| 🇨🇼 | CW | Curaçao | | |
| 🇨🇽 | CX | Christmas Island | | |
| 🇨🇾 | CY | Cyprus | | |
| 🇨🇿 | CZ | Czechia | | |
| 🇩🇪 | DE | Germany | | |
| 🇩🇬 | DG | Diego Garcia | | |
| 🇩🇯 | DJ | Djibouti | | |
| 🇩🇰 | DK | Denmark | | |
| 🇩🇲 | DM | Dominica | | |
| 🇩🇴 | DO | Dominican Republic | | |
| 🇩🇿 | DZ | Algeria | | |
| 🇪🇦 | EA | Ceuta & Melilla | | |
| 🇪🇨 | EC | Ecuador | | |
| 🇪🇪 | EE | Estonia | | |
| 🇪🇬 | EG | Egypt | | |
| 🇪🇭 | EH | Western Sahara | | |
| 🇪🇷 | ER | Eritrea | | |
| 🇪🇸 | ES | Spain | | |
| 🇪🇹 | ET | Ethiopia | | |
| 🇪🇺 | EU | European Union | | |
| 🇫🇮 | FI | Finland | | |
| 🇫🇯 | FJ | Fiji | | |
| 🇫🇰 | FK | Falkland Islands | | |
| 🇫🇲 | FM | Micronesia | | |
| 🇫🇴 | FO | Faroe Islands | | |
| 🇫🇷 | FR | France | | |
| 🇬🇦 | GA | Gabon | | |
| 🇬🇧 | GB | United Kingdom | | |
| 🇬🇩 | GD | Grenada | | |
| 🇬🇪 | GE | Georgia | | |
| 🇬🇫 | GF | French Guiana | | |
| 🇬🇬 | GG | Guernsey | | |
| 🇬🇭 | GH | Ghana | | |
| 🇬🇮 | GI | Gibraltar | | |
| 🇬🇱 | GL | Greenland | | |
| 🇬🇲 | GM | Gambia | | |
| 🇬🇳 | GN | Guinea | | |
| 🇬🇵 | GP | Guadeloupe | | |
| 🇬🇶 | GQ | Equatorial Guinea | | |
| 🇬🇷 | GR | Greece | | |
| 🇬🇸 | GS | South Georgia & South Sandwich Islands | | |
| 🇬🇹 | GT | Guatemala | | |
| 🇬🇺 | GU | Guam | | |
| 🇬🇼 | GW | Guinea-Bissau | | |
| 🇬🇾 | GY | Guyana | | |
| 🇭🇰 | HK | Hong Kong SAR China | | |
| 🇭🇲 | HM | Heard Island & McDonald Islands | | |
| 🇭🇳 | HN | Honduras | | |
| 🇭🇷 | HR | Croatia | | |
| 🇭🇹 | HT | Haiti | | |
| 🇭🇺 | HU | Hungary | | |
| 🇮🇨 | IC | Canary Islands | | |
| 🇮🇩 | ID | Indonesia | | |
| 🇮🇪 | IE | Ireland | | |
| 🇮🇱 | IL | Israel | | |
| 🇮🇲 | IM | Isle of Man | | |
| 🇮🇳 | IN | India | | |
| 🇮🇴 | IO | British Indian Ocean Territory | | |
| 🇮🇶 | IQ | Iraq | | |
| 🇮🇷 | IR | Iran | | |
| 🇮🇸 | IS | Iceland | | |
| 🇮🇹 | IT | Italy | | |
| 🇯🇪 | JE | Jersey | | |
| 🇯🇲 | JM | Jamaica | | |
| 🇯🇴 | JO | Jordan | | |
| 🇯🇵 | JP | Japan | | |
| 🇰🇪 | KE | Kenya | | |
| 🇰🇬 | KG | Kyrgyzstan | | |
| 🇰🇭 | KH | Cambodia | | |
| 🇰🇮 | KI | Kiribati | | |
| 🇰🇲 | KM | Comoros | | |
| 🇰🇳 | KN | St. Kitts & Nevis | | |
| 🇰🇵 | KP | North Korea | | |
| 🇰🇷 | KR | South Korea | | |
| 🇰🇼 | KW | Kuwait | | |
| 🇰🇾 | KY | Cayman Islands | | |
| 🇰🇿 | KZ | Kazakhstan | | |
| 🇱🇦 | LA | Laos | | |
| 🇱🇧 | LB | Lebanon | | |
| 🇱🇨 | LC | St. Lucia | | |
| 🇱🇮 | LI | Liechtenstein | | |
| 🇱🇰 | LK | Sri Lanka | | |
| 🇱🇷 | LR | Liberia | | |
| 🇱🇸 | LS | Lesotho | | |
| 🇱🇹 | LT | Lithuania | | |
| 🇱🇺 | LU | Luxembourg | | |
| 🇱🇻 | LV | Latvia | | |
| 🇱🇾 | LY | Libya | | |
| 🇲🇦 | MA | Morocco | | |
| 🇲🇨 | MC | Monaco | | |
| 🇲🇩 | MD | Moldova | | |
| 🇲🇪 | ME | Montenegro | | |
| 🇲🇫 | MF | St. Martin | | |
| 🇲🇬 | MG | Madagascar | | |
| 🇲🇭 | MH | Marshall Islands | | |
| 🇲🇰 | MK | North Macedonia | | |
| 🇲🇱 | ML | Mali | | |
| 🇲🇲 | MM | Myanmar (Burma) | | |
| 🇲🇳 | MN | Mongolia | | |
| 🇲🇴 | MO | Macao SAR China | | |
| 🇲🇵 | MP | Northern Mariana Islands | | |
| 🇲🇶 | MQ | Martinique | | |
| 🇲🇷 | MR | Mauritania | | |
| 🇲🇸 | MS | Montserrat | | |
| 🇲🇹 | MT | Malta | | |
| 🇲🇺 | MU | Mauritius | | |
| 🇲🇻 | MV | Maldives | | |
| 🇲🇼 | MW | Malawi | | |
| 🇲🇽 | MX | Mexico | | |
| 🇲🇾 | MY | Malaysia | | |
| 🇲🇿 | MZ | Mozambique | | |
| 🇳🇦 | NA | Namibia | | |
| 🇳🇨 | NC | New Caledonia | | |
| 🇳🇪 | NE | Niger | | |
| 🇳🇫 | NF | Norfolk Island | | |
| 🇳🇬 | NG | Nigeria | | |
| 🇳🇮 | NI | Nicaragua | | |
| 🇳🇱 | NL | Netherlands | | |
| 🇳🇴 | NO | Norway | | |
| 🇳🇵 | NP | Nepal | | |
| 🇳🇷 | NR | Nauru | | |
| 🇳🇺 | NU | Niue | | |
| 🇳🇿 | NZ | New Zealand | | |
| 🇴🇲 | OM | Oman | | |
| 🇵🇦 | PA | Panama | | |
| 🇵🇪 | PE | Peru | | |
| 🇵🇫 | PF | French Polynesia | | |
| 🇵🇬 | PG | Papua New Guinea | | |
| 🇵🇭 | PH | Philippines | | |
| 🇵🇰 | PK | Pakistan | | |
| 🇵🇱 | PL | Poland | | |
| 🇵🇲 | PM | St. Pierre & Miquelon | | |
| 🇵🇳 | PN | Pitcairn Islands | | |
| 🇵🇷 | PR | Puerto Rico | | |
| 🇵🇸 | PS | Palestinian Territories | | |
| 🇵🇹 | PT | Portugal | | |
| 🇵🇼 | PW | Palau | | |
| 🇵🇾 | PY | Paraguay | | |
| 🇶🇦 | QA | Qatar | | |
| 🇷🇪 | RE | Réunion | | |
| 🇷🇴 | RO | Romania | | |
| 🇷🇸 | RS | Serbia | | |
| 🇷🇺 | RU | Russia | | |
| 🇷🇼 | RW | Rwanda | | |
| 🇸🇦 | SA | Saudi Arabia | | |
| 🇸🇧 | SB | Solomon Islands | | |
| 🇸🇨 | SC | Seychelles | | |
| 🇸🇩 | SD | Sudan | | |
| 🇸🇪 | SE | Sweden | | |
| 🇸🇬 | SG | Singapore | | |
| 🇸🇭 | SH | St. Helena, Ascension & Tristan da Cunha | | |
| 🇸🇮 | SI | Slovenia | | |
| 🇸🇯 | SJ | Svalbard & Jan Mayen | | |
| 🇸🇰 | SK | Slovakia | | |
| 🇸🇱 | SL | Sierra Leone | | |
| 🇸🇲 | SM | San Marino | | |
| 🇸🇳 | SN | Senegal | | |
| 🇸🇴 | SO | Somalia | | |
| 🇸🇷 | SR | Suriname | | |
| 🇸🇸 | SS | South Sudan | | |
| 🇸🇹 | ST | São Tomé & Príncipe | | |
| 🇸🇻 | SV | El Salvador | | |
| 🇸🇽 | SX | Sint Maarten | | |
| 🇸🇾 | SY | Syria | | |
| 🇸🇿 | SZ | Eswatini | | |
| 🇹🇦 | TA | Tristan da Cunha | | |
| 🇹🇨 | TC | Turks & Caicos Islands | | |
| 🇹🇩 | TD | Chad | | |
| 🇹🇫 | TF | French Southern and Antarctic Lands | | |
| 🇹🇬 | TG | Togo | | |
| 🇹🇭 | TH | Thailand | | |
| 🇹🇯 | TJ | Tajikistan | | |
| 🇹🇰 | TK | Tokelau | | |
| 🇹🇱 | TL | Timor-Leste | | |
| 🇹🇲 | TM | Turkmenistan | | |
| 🇹🇳 | TN | Tunisia | | |
| 🇹🇴 | TO | Tonga | | |
| 🇹🇷 | TR | Türkiye | | |
| 🇹🇹 | TT | Trinidad & Tobago | | |
| 🇹🇻 | TV | Tuvalu | | |
| 🇹🇼 | TW | Taiwan | | |
| 🇹🇿 | TZ | Tanzania | | |
| 🇺🇦 | UA | Ukraine | | |
| 🇺🇬 | UG | Uganda | | |
| 🇺🇲 | UM | U.S. Outlying Islands | | |
| 🇺🇳 | UN | United Nations | | |
| 🇺🇸 | US | United States | | |
| 🇺🇾 | UY | Uruguay | | |
| 🇺🇿 | UZ | Uzbekistan | | |
| 🇻🇦 | VA | Vatican City | | |
| 🇻🇨 | VC | St. Vincent & Grenadines | | |
| 🇻🇪 | VE | Venezuela | | |
| 🇻🇬 | VG | British Virgin Islands | | |
| 🇻🇮 | VI | U.S. Virgin Islands | | |
| 🇻🇳 | VN | Vietnam | | |
| 🇻🇺 | VU | Vanuatu | | |
| 🇼🇫 | WF | Wallis & Futuna | Wallis and Futuna | |
| 🇼🇸 | WS | Samoa | | |
| 🇽🇰 | XK | Kosovo | | |
| 🇾🇪 | YE | Yemen | | |
| 🇾🇹 | YT | Mayotte | | |
| 🇿🇦 | ZA | South Africa | | |
| 🇿🇲 | ZM | Zambia | | |
| 🇿🇼 | ZW | Zimbabwe | | |

Some providers may internally have assigned specific codes to deprecated sequences or to unofficial ones, just like WhatsApp did by putting the Texas flag as XT (🇽🇹).

List of deprecated sequences
| deprecated | | | replacement | | | |
| flag | code | region | flag | code | region | possible rendering |
|---|---|---|---|---|---|---|
| 🇦🇳 | AN | Netherlands Antilles | 🇨🇼 | CW | Curaçao | |
| 🇦🇳 | AN | Netherlands Antilles | 🇸🇽 | SX | Sint Maarten | |
| 🇦🇳 | AN | Netherlands Antilles | 🇧🇶 | BQ | Caribbean Netherlands | |
| 🇧🇺 | BU | Burma | 🇲🇲 | MM | Myanmar (Burma) | |
| 🇨🇸 | CS | Serbia and Montenegro | 🇷🇸 | RS | Serbia | |
| 🇨🇸 | CS | Serbia and Montenegro | 🇲🇪 | ME | Montenegro | |
| 🇩🇩 | DD | German Democratic Republic | 🇩🇪 | DE | Germany | |
| 🇫🇽 | FX | Metropolitan France | 🇫🇷 | FR | France | |
| 🇳🇹 | NT | Neutral Zone | 🇸🇦 | SA | Saudi Arabia | |
| 🇳🇹 | NT | Neutral Zone | 🇮🇶 | IQ | Iraq | |
| 🇶🇺 | QU | European Union | 🇪🇺 | EU | European Union | |
| 🇸🇺 | SU | Union of Soviet Socialist Republics | 🇷🇺 | RU | Russia | |
| 🇸🇺 | SU | Union of Soviet Socialist Republics | 🇦🇲 | AM | Armenia | |
| 🇸🇺 | SU | Union of Soviet Socialist Republics | 🇦🇿 | AZ | Azerbaijan | |
| 🇸🇺 | SU | Union of Soviet Socialist Republics | 🇧🇾 | BY | Belarus | |
| 🇸🇺 | SU | Union of Soviet Socialist Republics | 🇪🇪 | EE | Estonia | |
| 🇸🇺 | SU | Union of Soviet Socialist Republics | 🇬🇪 | GE | Georgia | |
| 🇸🇺 | SU | Union of Soviet Socialist Republics | 🇰🇿 | KZ | Kazakhstan | |
| 🇸🇺 | SU | Union of Soviet Socialist Republics | 🇰🇬 | KG | Kyrgyzstan | |
| 🇸🇺 | SU | Union of Soviet Socialist Republics | 🇱🇻 | LV | Latvia | |
| 🇸🇺 | SU | Union of Soviet Socialist Republics | 🇱🇹 | LT | Lithuania | |
| 🇸🇺 | SU | Union of Soviet Socialist Republics | 🇲🇩 | MD | Moldova | |
| 🇸🇺 | SU | Union of Soviet Socialist Republics | 🇹🇯 | TJ | Tajikistan | |
| 🇸🇺 | SU | Union of Soviet Socialist Republics | 🇹🇲 | TM | Turkmenistan | |
| 🇸🇺 | SU | Union of Soviet Socialist Republics | 🇺🇦 | UA | Ukraine | |
| 🇸🇺 | SU | Union of Soviet Socialist Republics | 🇺🇿 | UZ | Uzbekistan | |
| 🇹🇵 | TP | East Timor | 🇹🇱 | TL | Timor-Leste | |
| 🇾🇩 | YD | Democratic Yemen | 🇾🇪 | YE | Yemen | |
| 🇾🇺 | YU | Yugoslavia | 🇷🇸 | RS | Serbia | |
| 🇾🇺 | YU | Yugoslavia | 🇲🇪 | ME | Montenegro | |
| 🇿🇷 | ZR | Zaire | 🇨🇩 | CD | Congo-Kinshasa | |

A separate mechanism (emoji tag sequences) is used for regional flags, such as England 🏴󠁧󠁢󠁥󠁮󠁧󠁿, Scotland 🏴󠁧󠁢󠁳󠁣󠁴󠁿, Wales 🏴󠁧󠁢󠁷󠁬󠁳󠁿, Texas 🏴󠁵󠁳󠁴󠁸󠁿 or California 🏴󠁵󠁳󠁣󠁡󠁿. It uses U+1F3F4 🏴 WAVING BLACK FLAG and formatting tag characters instead of regional indicator symbols. It is based on ISO 3166-2 regions with hyphen removed and lowercase, e.g. GB-ENG → gbeng, terminating with U+E007F CANCEL TAG. Flag of England is therefore represented by a sequence U+1F3F4, U+E0067, U+E0062, U+E0065, U+E006E, U+E0067, U+E007F. In the tenth revision the Unicode consortium was considering U+1F3F3 🏳 WAVING WHITE FLAG instead, but from eleventh onwards it is black. Some vendors choose to include custom zero-width joiner sequences that only show up on their platform, such as WhatsApp and their Refugee Nation Flag 🏳️‍🟧‍⬛️‍🟧.

== Unicode block ==
Regional indicator symbols subset of Enclosed Alphanumeric Supplement^{[1]} Official Unicode Consortium code chart (PDF)
| | 0 | 1 | 2 | 3 | 4 | 5 | 6 | 7 | 8 | 9 | A | B | C | D | E | F |
| ... | (U+1F100–U+1F1E5 omitted) | | | | | | | | | | | | | | | |
| U+1F1Ex | | | | | | | 🇦 | 🇧 | 🇨 | 🇩 | 🇪 | 🇫 | 🇬 | 🇭 | 🇮 | 🇯 |
| U+1F1Fx | 🇰 | 🇱 | 🇲 | 🇳 | 🇴 | 🇵 | 🇶 | 🇷 | 🇸 | 🇹 | 🇺 | 🇻 | 🇼 | 🇽 | 🇾 | 🇿 |
Notes 1.As of Unicode version 18.0

== Background ==
In 2007 a draft proposal was presented to the Unicode Technical Committee to encode emoji symbols, specifically those in widespread use on mobile phones by Japanese telecommunications companies DoCoMo, KDDI, and SoftBank. The proposed symbols included ten national flags: Japan (🇯🇵), the United States (🇺🇸), China (🇨🇳), Germany (🇩🇪), Spain (🇪🇸), France (🇫🇷), the UK (🇬🇧), Italy (🇮🇹), South Korea (🇰🇷) and Russia (🇷🇺). Encoding these flags but not other countries' flags was considered, by some, as prejudicial. One rejected solution was to encode the ten flags but call them "EMOJI COMPATIBILITY SYMBOL-n" and represent them visually in the Standard as "EC n" instead of showing the flags they represent. Another rejected solution would have allocated 676 codepoints (26×26) for each possible two letter combination of A–Z. They would represent political entities based on ISO 3166 such as "JP" for Japan, "US" for the United States and "EU" for the European Union or Internet ccTLDs (country code top-level domains).

The accepted solution was to add 26 characters for letters used for the representation of regional indicators, which used in pairs would represent the ten national flags and possible future extensions. Per the Unicode Standard "the main purpose of such [regional indicator symbol] pairs is to provide unambiguous roundtrip mappings to certain characters used in the emoji core sets" specifically the ten national flags 🇯🇵, 🇺🇸, 🇨🇳, 🇩🇪, 🇪🇸, 🇫🇷, 🇬🇧, 🇮🇹, 🇰🇷 and 🇷🇺.

== See also ==
- Flag icons for languages
