= Flag of Guadeloupe =

Flags of the French overseas region of Guadeloupe

Guadeloupe
- Unofficial flag of Guadeloupe
- Use: Civil flag
- Flag of the Guadeloupe Region
- Use: State flag

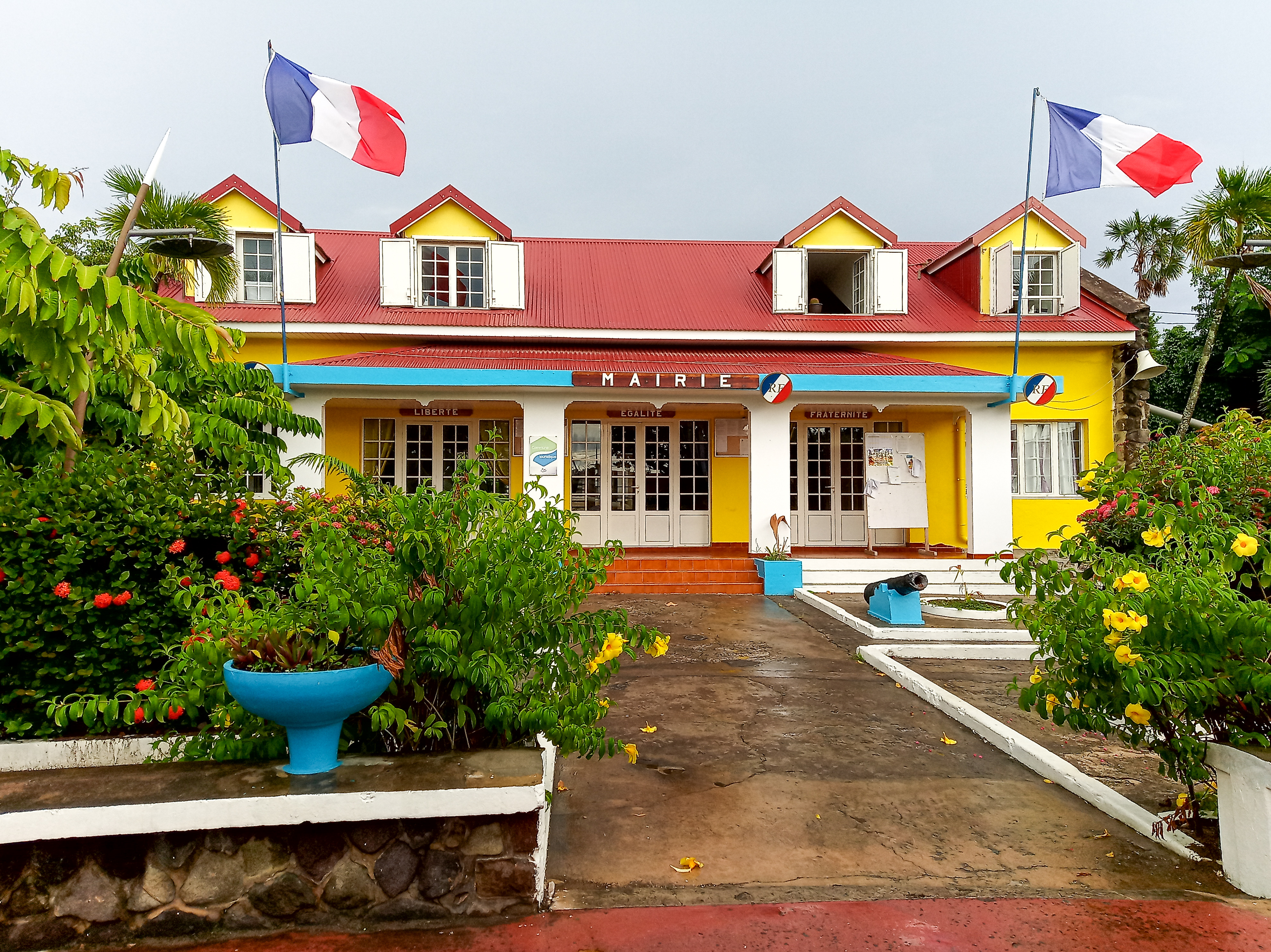
Tricolours at the mairie of Terre-de-Haut

Guadeloupe, an overseas region and department of France located in the Caribbean, has no flag with official status other than the French national flag.

== Other flags ==
The French tricolore is the official national flag used in Guadeloupe.

In addition to the French flag, an inscribed regional logo on a white field is often used as regional flag, similar to the practice in Mayotte and Réunion. The logo of Guadeloupe shows a stylized Sun and bird on a green and light blue square with the subscript REGION GUADELOUPE underlined in yellow.

A locally used unofficial flag, based on the coat of arms of Guadeloupe's capital Basse-Terre has a black or red field with a 30-rayed yellow sun and a green sugarcane, and a blue stripe with three yellow fleurs-de-lis on the top. The flag appeared on a 10 euro collector coin minted by Monnaie de Paris in 2010. as well as some fabric badges.

The independentist People's Union for the Liberation of Guadeloupe has proposed a national flag. It bears great resemblance to the national flag of Suriname, with a wider red stripe and the star shifted towards the hoist.

== Gallery ==
Locally used, unofficial flag.

Red variant of the locally used, unofficial flag.

Flag proposed by the UPLG since 1978, the most popular in the archipelago.

Flag proposed by the GONG between 1963 and 1977.

== See also ==
- Coat of arms of Guadeloupe
- Flags of the regions of France
- List of political parties in Guadeloupe
