= List of Malawian records in swimming =

The Malawian records in swimming are the fastest ever performances of swimmers from Malawi, which are recognised and ratified by the Malawi Aquatic Union.

All records were set in finals unless noted otherwise.

== Long Course (50 m) ==
=== Men ===
Event	Time		Name	Club	Date	Meet	Location	Ref
50m freestyle	24.00	h	Filipe Gomes	Malawi	30 July 2021	Olympic Games	Tokyo, Japan	
100m freestyle	53.49		Filipe Gomes	-		-		
200m freestyle	1:58.91		Filipe Gomes	-		-		
400m freestyle	4:20.99		Filipe Gomes	-		-		
800m freestyle	9:16.41		Filipe Gomes	Malawi	16 February 2019	CANA Zone IV Championships	Windhoek, South Africa	
1500 m freestyle								
50 m backstroke								
100 m backstroke								
200 m backstroke								
50m breaststroke	30.48	h	Filipe Gomes	Malawi	11 September 2018	African Championships	Algiers, Algeria	
100m breaststroke	1:07.37	h	Filipe Gomes	Malawi	23 July 2017	World Championships	Budapest, Hungary	
200m breaststroke	2:28.94	h	Filipe Gomes	Malawi	27 July 2017	World Championships	Budapest, Hungary	
50m butterfly	26.29		Filipe Gomes	Malawi	17 February 2019	CANA Zone IV Championships	Windhoek, South Africa	
100 m butterfly								
200 m butterfly								
200m individual medley	2:17.92		Filipe Gomes	-		-		
400 m individual medley								
4×100 m freestyle relay								
4×200 m freestyle relay								
4×100 m medley relay								

Legend: # – Record awaiting ratification by Malawi Aquatic Union; WR – World record; AF – African record;
Records not set in finals: h – heat; sf – semifinal; r – relay 1st leg; rh – relay heat 1st leg; b – B final; † – en route to final mark; tt – time trial

=== Women ===
Event	Time		Name	Club	Date	Meet	Location	Ref
50 m freestyle	27.73	h	Joyce Tafatatha	Malawi	21 August 2014	Youth Olympic Games	Nanjing, China	
100 m freestyle	1:04.70		Ammara Pinto					
200 m freestyle	2:26.50		Ammara Pinto	-		-		
400 m freestyle								
800 m freestyle	11:19.30		Ammara Pinto	-		-		
1500 m freestyle								
50 m backstroke	31.59	h	Joyce Tafatatha	Malawi	20 August 2014	Youth Olympic Games	Nanjing, China	
100 m backstroke	1:16.68	h	Ammara Pinto	Malawi	22 July 2019	World Championships	Gwangju, South Korea	
200 m backstroke								
50 m breaststroke	42.56		Tayamika Chang'anamuno	-		-		
100 m breaststroke								
200 m breaststroke								
50 m butterfly	29.59	h	Joyce Tafatatha	Malawi	26 July 2014	Commonwealth Games	Glasgow, United Kingdom	
100 m butterfly								
200 m butterfly								
200 m individual medley	3:05.76		Ammara Pinto	Malawi	19 February 2019	CANA Zone IV Championships	Windhoek, South Africa	
400 m individual medley								
4×100 m freestyle relay								
4×200 m freestyle relay								
4×100 m medley relay								

Legend: # – Record awaiting ratification by Malawi Aquatic Union; WR – World record; AF – African record;
Records not set in finals: h – heat; sf – semifinal; r – relay 1st leg; rh – relay heat 1st leg; b – B final; † – en route to final mark; tt – time trial

=== Mixed relay ===
Event	Time	Name	Club	Date	Meet	Location	Ref
4×100 m freestyle relay							
4×100 m medley relay	5:17.26		Malawi	18 February 2019	CANA Zone IV Championships	Windhoek, South Africa	

Legend: # – Record awaiting ratification by Malawi Aquatic Union; WR – World record; AF – African record;
Records not set in finals: h – heat

== Short Course (25 m) ==
=== Men ===
Event	Time		Name	Club	Date	Meet	Location	Ref
50m freestyle	26.22	h	Michael Swift	Malawi	8 December 2016	World Championships	Windsor, Canada	
100m freestyle	59.15	h	Michael Swift	Malawi	10 December 2016	World Championships	Windsor, Canada	
200 m freestyle								
400 m freestyle								
800 m freestyle								
1500 m freestyle								
50 m backstroke								
100 m backstroke								
200 m backstroke								
50m breaststroke	30.04	h, †	Filipe Gomes	Malawi	11 December 2018	World Championships	Hangzhou, China	
100m breaststroke	1:04.18	h	Filipe Gomes	Malawi	11 December 2018	World Championships	Hangzhou, China	
200m breaststroke	2:19.33	h	Filipe Gomes	Malawi	13 December 2018	World Championships	Hangzhou, China	
50m butterfly	29.02	h	Michael Swift	Malawi	9 December 2016	World Championships	Windsor, Canada	
100 m butterfly								
200 m butterfly								
200 m individual medley								
400 m individual medley								
4×100 m freestyle relay								
4×200 m freestyle relay								
4×100 m medley relay								

Legend: # – Record awaiting ratification by Malawi Aquatic Union; WR – World record; AF – African record;
Records not set in finals: h – heat; sf – semifinal; r – relay 1st leg; rh – relay heat 1st leg; b – B final; † – en route to final mark; tt – time trial

=== Women ===
Event	Time		Name	Club	Date	Meet	Location	Ref
50m freestyle	27.37	h	Joyce Tafatatha	Malawi	6 December 2014	World Championships	Doha, Qatar	
100m freestyle	1:03.60	h	Ammara Pinto	Malawi	17 December 2021	World Championships	Abu Dhabi, United Arab Emirates	
200 m freestyle								
400 m freestyle								
800 m freestyle								
1500 m freestyle								
50m backstroke	29.82	h	Joyce Tafatatha	Malawi	6 December 2014	World Championships	Doha, Qatar	
100m backstroke	1:15.35	h	Ammara Pinto	Malawi	6 December 2016	World Championships	Windsor, Canada	
200 m backstroke								
50m breaststroke	44.13	h	Tayamika Chang'Anamuno	Malawi	6 December 2016	World Championships	Windsor, Canada	
100 m breaststroke								
200 m breaststroke								
50m butterfly	29.09	h	Joyce Tafatatha	Malawi	4 December 2014	World Championships	Doha, Qatar	
100 m butterfly								
200 m butterfly								
100m individual medley	1:20.65	h	Ammara Pinto	Malawi	8 December 2016	World Championships	Windsor, Canada	
200 m individual medley								
400 m individual medley								
4×100 m freestyle relay								
4×200 m freestyle relay								
4×100 m medley relay								

Legend: # – Record awaiting ratification by Malawi Aquatic Union; WR – World record; AF – African record;
Records not set in finals: h – heat; sf – semifinal; r – relay 1st leg; rh – relay heat 1st leg; b – B final; † – en route to final mark; tt – time trial
