= Malawi at the 2023 World Aquatics Championships =

- Flag of Malawi
- FINA code: MAW
- National federation: Malawi Aquatic Union

in Fukuoka, Japan
- Competitors: 4 in 1 sport
- Medals: Gold 0 Silver 0 Bronze 0 Total 0

World Aquatics Championships appearances
- 1973; 1975; 1978; 1982; 1986; 1991; 1994; 1998; 2001; 2003; 2005; 2007; 2009; 2011; 2013; 2015; 2017; 2019; 2022; 2023; 2024

Malawi competed at the 2023 World Aquatics Championships in Fukuoka, Japan from 14 to 30 July.

== Swimming ==
Malawi entered 4 swimmers.

Men

Athlete	Event	Heat		Semifinal		Final	
Athlete	Event	Time	Rank	Time	Rank	Time	Rank
Filipe Gomes	100 metre freestyle	54.05	90	Did not advance			
Filipe Gomes	200 metre individual medley	Did not start					
Muhammad Ali Moosa	50 metre freestyle	28.20	109	Did not advance			
Muhammad Ali Moosa	50 metre butterfly	31.57	87	Did not advance			

Women

Athlete	Event	Heat		Semifinal		Final	
Athlete	Event	Time	Rank	Time	Rank	Time	Rank
Tayamika Chang'Anamuno	100 metre freestyle	1:06.58	68	Did not advance			
Tayamika Chang'Anamuno	50 metre backstroke	36.03	60	Did not advance			
Ammara Pinto	50 metre freestyle	31.17	89	Did not advance			
Ammara Pinto	100 metre backstroke	1:22.06	61	Did not advance			

Mixed

Athlete	Event	Heat		Final	
Athlete	Event	Time	Rank	Time	Rank
Filipe Gomes; Ammara Pinto; Tayamika Chang'Anamuno; Muhammad Ali Moosa	4 × 100 m freestyle relay	4:14.43	41	Did not advance	
Ammara Pinto; Filipe Gomes; Muhammad Ali Moosa; Tayamika Chang'Anamuno	4 × 100 m medley relay	Disqualified		Did not advance	
