= Malawi at the 2015 World Aquatics Championships =

- Flag of Malawi
- World Aquatics code: MAW
- National federation: Malawi Aquatic Union

in Kazan, Russia
- Competitors: 3 in 1 sport
- Medals: Gold 0 Silver 0 Bronze 0 Total 0

World Aquatics Championships appearances
- 1973; 1975; 1978; 1982; 1986; 1991; 1994; 1998; 2001; 2003; 2005; 2007; 2009; 2011; 2013; 2015; 2017; 2019; 2022; 2023; 2024; 2025

Malawi competed at the 2015 World Aquatics Championships in Kazan, Russia from 24 July to 9 August 2015.

== Swimming ==
Malawian swimmers have achieved qualifying standards in the following events (up to a maximum of 2 swimmers in each event at the A-standard entry time, and 1 at the B-standard):

Men

Athlete	Event	Heat		Semifinal		Final	
Athlete	Event	Time	Rank	Time	Rank	Time	Rank
Brave Lifa	50 m freestyle	29.07	109	did not advance			
Brave Lifa	50 m butterfly	30.92	73	did not advance			

Women

Athlete	Event	Heat		Semifinal		Final	
Athlete	Event	Time	Rank	Time	Rank	Time	Rank
Tayamika Chang'anamuno	50 m backstroke	38.81	51	did not advance			
Tayamika Chang'anamuno	50 m breaststroke	47.00	69	did not advance			
Zahra Pinto	50 m freestyle	30.20	91	did not advance			
Zahra Pinto	100 m freestyle	1:07.32	87	did not advance			
