= Malawi at the 2024 World Aquatics Championships =

- Flag of Malawi
- FINA code: MAW
- National federation: Malawi Aquatic Union

in Doha, Qatar
- Competitors: 4 in 1 sport
- Medals: Gold 0 Silver 0 Bronze 0 Total 0

World Aquatics Championships appearances
- 1973; 1975; 1978; 1982; 1986; 1991; 1994; 1998; 2001; 2003; 2005; 2007; 2009; 2011; 2013; 2015; 2017; 2019; 2022; 2023; 2024

Malawi will compete at the 2024 World Aquatics Championships in Doha, Qatar from 2 to 18 February.

== Swimming ==
Malawian swimmers have achieved qualifying standards in the following events.

Men

| Athlete | Event | Heat | | Semifinal | | Final | |
| Athlete | Event | Time | Rank | Time | Rank | Time | Rank |
|---|---|---|---|---|---|---|---|
| Filipe Gomes | 50 m freestyle | 24.34 | 70 | Did not advance | | | |
| Filipe Gomes | 200 m individual medley | 2:12.53 | 35 | Did not advance | | | |
| Asher Banda | 100 m freestyle | 1:00.03 | 96 | Did not advance | | | |
| Asher Banda | 50 m butterfly | 29.51 | 59 | Did not advance | | | |

Women

| Athlete | Event | Heat | | Semifinal | | Final | |
| Athlete | Event | Time | Rank | Time | Rank | Time | Rank |
|---|---|---|---|---|---|---|---|
| Jessica Makwenda | 50 m freestyle | 31.07 | 91 | Did not advance | | | |
| Jessica Makwenda | 50 m butterfly | 35.65 | 53 | Did not advance | | | |
| Tayamika Chang'anamuno | 100 m freestyle | 1:07.53 | 76 | Did not advance | | | |
| Tayamika Chang'anamuno | 50 m backstroke | 36.40 | 52 | Did not advance | | | |
