= Malawi at the 2017 World Aquatics Championships =

- Flag of Malawi
- FINA code: MAW
- National federation: Malawi Aquatic Union

in Budapest, Hungary
- Competitors: 3 in 1 sport
- Medals: Gold 0 Silver 0 Bronze 0 Total 0

World Aquatics Championships appearances
- 1973; 1975; 1978; 1982; 1986; 1991; 1994; 1998; 2001; 2003; 2005; 2007; 2009; 2011; 2013; 2015; 2017; 2019; 2022; 2023; 2024

Malawi competed at the 2017 World Aquatics Championships in Budapest, Hungary from 14 July to 30 July.

== Swimming ==
Malawi has received a Universality invitation from FINA to send three swimmers (one man and two women) to the World Championships.

Athlete	Event	Heat		Semifinal		Final	
Athlete	Event	Time	Rank	Time	Rank	Time	Rank
Felipe Gomes	Men's 100 m breaststroke	1:07.37	64	did not advance			
Felipe Gomes	Men's 200 m breaststroke	2:28.94	39	did not advance			
Tayamika Chang'anamuno	Women's 100 m freestyle	1:10.84	75	did not advance			
Tayamika Chang'anamuno	Women's 50 m backstroke	37.87	62	did not advance			
Ammara Pinto	Women's 50 m freestyle	30.59	74	did not advance			
Ammara Pinto	Women's 100 m backstroke	1:07.49	48	did not advance			
