= Saint Andrews International High School =

- Blantyre, Southern Region, Private Bag 212; Malawi

Information
- Type: Private school
- Motto: Doctrina Habet Onus (With Education Comes Responsibility)
- Founded: 1938
- School district: Blantyre
- Chairperson: Mr Peter Nkosi
- Principal: Mrs Sarah Samanyika
- Faculty: 5
- Age: 11+
- Student to teacher ratio: 8:1
- Houses: Chiradzulu, Michiru, Ndirande, Soche
- Sports: Rugby; Football; Cricket; Athletics; Hockey; Netball; Basketball; Swimming
- Nickname: SAIntS
- Yearbook: Fisherman
- Affiliation: AIMS, COBIS
- Website: Saints Webpage

The St. Andrew's International School in Blantyre, Malawi was founded in 1938 by the (Presbyterian) Church of Scotland Mission. The high school in its present form was established in 1958. SAIntS is a British International School offering (i) GCSE, A Level and BTEC qualifications.

== History ==
It was founded as part of a series of mission schools in Limbe, Blantyre and Zomba in Nyasaland (Malawi) in the 1920s just after the First World War.

== Three distinct schools ==
The school split into three parts creating a kindergarten, primary school and a new high school in three locations in 1957. The high school opened on 28 January 1957.

== Saint Andrews High School ==
The high school came to be known as Saint Andrews High School (SAHS) in 1958. In 1965, a year after Malawian Independence, the school changed its name to "St. Andrew's Secondary School" (SASS).

== Saint Andrew's International High School (SAIntS) ==
Saints is a school located in the Nyambadwe suburb of Blantyre, Malawi, and in 2011 it had 520 students from more than 30 nationalities as part of its day and boarding school.

== Cricket ground ==
Saint Andrews International High School
Ground information
- Location: Blantyre, Malawi
- Country: Malawi

International information
- Only men's T20I: 10 November 2019: Malawi v Mozambique
- First women's T20I: 6 November 2019: Malawi v Mozambique
- Last women's T20I: 10 November 2019: Malawi v Mozambique
- As of 10 November 2019; Source: Cricinfo

In November 2019, it was named as one of the venues to host 2019 T20 Kwacha Cup, a Twenty20 International (T20I) cricket tournament.

== Academics ==
Students study a British style curriculum including GCSE/IGCSE, BTECs and A levels.

== Houses and clubs ==
The school consists of various houses and clubs; such as Chiradzulu, Michiru, Ndirande and Soche, named after the mountains surrounding Blantyre.

== Boarding ==
Approximately 105 students were boarders in 2011. There are separate boys' and girls' hostels and a team of boarding supervisors.

== Accomplishments ==
- In 2003, the school was noted in the African Almanac as one of the top 100 schools in Africa.
- Its swimming program trained Malawian Olympic swimmer, Joyce Tafatatha

== Alumni ==
Saints has an active alumni chapter in Malawi, Australia, and South Africa. A publication by former students of the federation era (federation of Rhodesia and Nyasaland), The Federal Saints Journal, is distributed to Saints alumni in over 40 countries world wide.

=== Notable alumni ===
- Tapps Bandawe, music producer
- Lillian Koreia Mpatsa
- Billy Abner Mayaya -Theologist, civil rights activist
- Yvonne Mhango - Economist
- Austin Muluzi - Minister of Economic Development
- Kimba Mutanda - Rapper
- Vanessa Nsona - Fashion Designer, entrepreneur
- Joyce Tafatatha - Malawian Olympic Swimmer
- Chapanga (Peter) Wilson - Poet
- Ammara Pinto - Olympic swimmer
- Eve Jardine-Young - Principal Cheltenham Ladies' College

== Notable educators ==
- Aaron Sangala, Music and French Teacher
