= Flag and coat of arms of Mayotte =

French overseas region/department flag and coat of arms

Department of Mayotte
- Flag of France
- Tricolore
- Use: National flag, civil and state ensign
- Proportion: 2:3
- Adopted: 15 February 1794
- Unofficial flag of Mayotte
- Use: Unofficial flag
- Design: The coat of arms with a red text that says Mayotte on a white field
- Use: Banner used by the Departmental Council of Mayotte.

Mayotte, an overseas region of France, has no official flag of its own, but the flag of France serves as its national flag. The coat of arms of Mayotte is well defined and was adopted by the predecessor entity of the Department of Mayotte in 1982.

== Flag ==
Mayotte is an overseas region and department of France. Therefore, the flag of France is its national flag. However, it has no flag of its own.

A banner is flown by the departmental council, consisting of the department's coat of arms on a white field with the words "DÉPARTEMENT DE MAYOTTE".

== Coat of arms ==
Coat of arms of Mayotte

Versions
- Logo used by the Departmental Council of Mayotte.

- Escutcheon
- Armiger: Emmanuel Macron, President of the French Republic
- Adopted: 23 July 1982
- Shield: Per fess azure a crescent argent and gules two ylang-ylang flowers or; within a bordure engrelled argent
- Supporters: Two seahorses
- Motto: Ra Hachiri (We are vigilant)
- Other elements: Top: Département; Bottom: de Mayotte

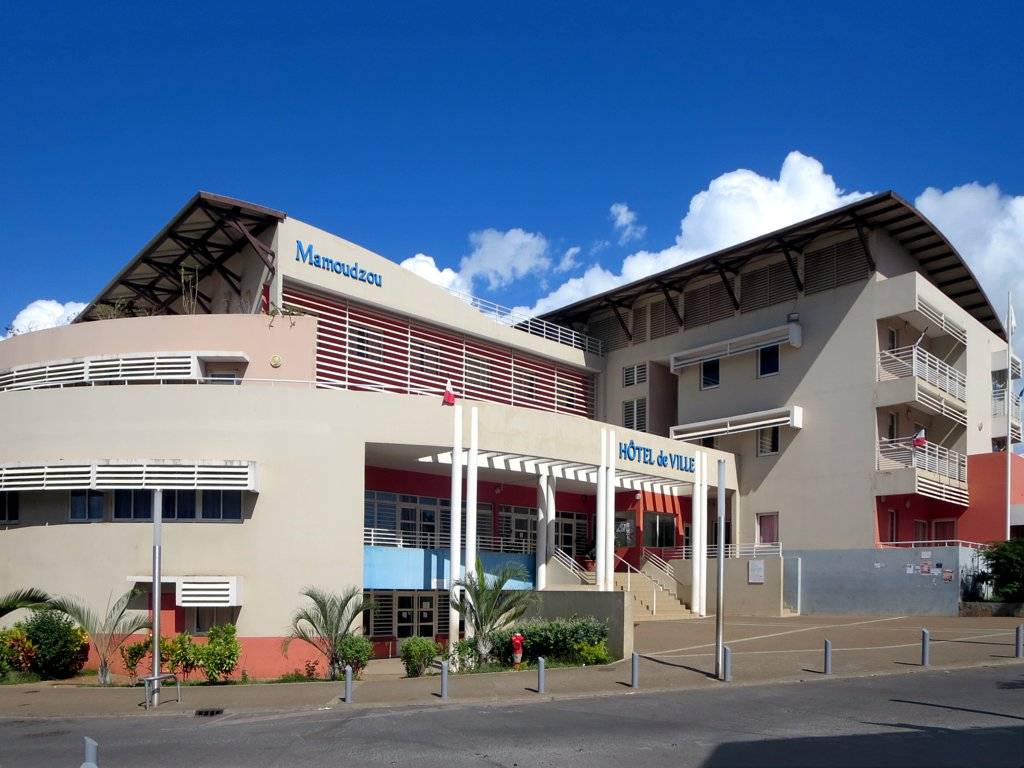
French tricolour over the Mamoudzou City Hall

The coat of arms of Mayotte were created by Reunion Archives former director Michel Chabin and drawn by Pascale Santerre. The proposal was adopted by the former General Council of Mayotte on 23 July 1982 and assumed by the new department in 2011.

The blue and the red come from the flag of France, with the addition of a yellow shade for the two ylang-ylang flowers. The department's graphic charter gives the following color codes for the coat of arms:

Colour scheme	Red	Blue	Yellow
CMYK	0 ◦ 95 ◦ 94 ◦ 0	85 ◦ 71 ◦ 0 ◦ 0	9 ◦ 0 ◦ 91 ◦ 0
Pantone	485 C	2945 C	3945 C
RGB	228 ◦ 35 ◦ 34	56 ◦ 84 ◦ 157	245 ◦ 230 ◦ 10
Web colors	E42322	38549D	F5E60A

The escutcheon, supported by two seahorses, reads as follows: Per fess azure a crescent argent and gules two ylang-ylang flowers or; within a bordure engrelled argent. The coat of arms also displays Mayotte motto, Ra Hachiri, translated from Shimaore as "We are vigilant". Finally, the whole is enframed at the top by Département and at the bottom by de Mayotte, with de written vertically. The font used is Barmeno Bold.

In addition to the main version, colored, there are also two others: one in shades of grey and the other in black and white, to be used if technical constraints arose. The graphical charter imposes a 100% black and 100% white shades for the latter and the following color codes for the former:

Colour scheme	Red	Blue	Yellow
CMYK	0 ◦ 0 ◦ 0 ◦ 60	0 ◦ 0 ◦ 0 ◦ 80	0 ◦ 0 ◦ 0 ◦ 20
Pantone	877 C	425 C	Cool Gray 2 C
RGB	135 ◦ 136 ◦ 13	88 ◦ 88 ◦ 90	217 ◦ 218 ◦ 219
Web colors	87888A	58585A	D9DADB

== Seal ==
The Departmental Council of Mayotte uses a seal based on the Great Seal of France.

Seal of the Departmental Council of Mayotte

== See also ==
- Flag of Réunion
- Coat of arms of Réunion
