= Coat of arms of Guadeloupe =

- Unofficial coat of arms

Guadeloupe, a région and overseas département of France in the Caribbean, does not have an official coat of arms, however an unofficial coat of arms and a government logo are sometimes used in a similar capacity.

== Unofficial coat of arms ==
Guadeloupe has an unofficial coat of arms based on the coat of arms of its capital Basse-Terre. The arms have a black field with a 30-rayed yellow sun and a green sugarcane, and a blue stripe with three yellow fleurs-de-lis on the top.

== Logo ==
Logo used by the Regional Council of Guadeloupe

The regional government uses a logo showing a stylized sun and bird on a green and blue square, with REGION GUADELOUPE underlined in yellow inscribed beneath it. The device is central to the flag used by the government of the région.

== See also ==
- Flag of Guadeloupe
