= Billy Abner Mayaya =

Malawian artist and activist

- Born: August 24, 1964 (age 61)
- Citizenship: Malawian
- Occupation: Human rights activist
- Political party: Democratic Progressive Party

Billy Abner Mayaya (born August 24, 1964) is a Malawian human rights activist, artist, poet and theologian.

Mayaya is particularly noted for his role as the Chairperson of the National Right to Food Network, a loose coalition of about 25 Non-Governmental Organisation (NGOs) working in the area of Civil and Political Rights. The coalition is designed to promote Economic, Social and Cultural Rights with a specific focus on the Human right to food in Malawi. Of particular significance has been the development of a draft Right to Food Bill, with advocacy focused on targeting the Malawi National Assembly, the Ministry of Agriculture, the Malawi Law Commission and the Malawi Human Rights Commission.

== Early life and education ==
Billy Mayaya was born to Abner Lemon Mayaya (August 15, 1932) a former career diplomat and Mirriam Chiwambo (died November 2007 aged 74 years). His father worked for more than 32 years for the government of Dr Hastings Kamuzu Banda. Because of his father's diplomat job, Mayaya attended the Sandford English Community School in Addis Ababa, Langley High School in Langley Oaks, Virginia, and Saint Andrews International High School in Blantyre, Malawi. He enrolled for undergraduate studies at the TransAfrica Theological College in Kitwe, Zambia, a Bachelor of Arts from the University of Malawi Chancellor College, received a Master of Science in Strategic Management from the University of Derby, as well as a Master of Business Administration from the University of Malawi, the Polytechnic. He is currently enrolled as a PhD Student at the Mzuzu University in Northern Malawi.

== Controversy ==
He began work as a teacher in Malawian private secondary schools teaching English, French and History. He came to prominence when he was recruited as a Programme Facilitator for Church and Society, the Human Rights and Advocacy department of the Church of Central African Presbyterian, the second largest denomination in Malawi after the Catholic Church. In 2002, together with a colleague Robson Chitengo, he called for the impeachment of the then State President of Malawi, Bakili Muluzi after rumors that he was planning for an unconstitutional third term.

In 2004, after the election of Muluzi's handpicked successor, Bingu wa Mutharika, a press statement was released by Church and Society signed by Mayaya and Chitengo calling for the impeachment of the newly elected President after it emerged unofficially that Mutharika was planning to dump the party that endorsed as its candidate and form his own party, the Democratic Progressive Party with backing from Taiwan. Church officials were displeased with the press release and publicly disassociated themselves from it. Mayaya and Chitengo were summoned to a disciplinary hearing with threats that their jobs were on the line. Mayaya publicly apologiz

ed for the blunder, whereas Chitengo resigned with intentions to run as a Parliamentary candidate in by-elections.

In 2011, he was the official spokesperson of the July 20 Demonstrations against the government of former President Bingu wa Mutharika. The same year, he organized a demonstration against the presence of Sudanese dictator Omar al Bashir during the COMESA summit. He was subsequently arrested and charged with sedition together with lawyer Habiba Osman, Ben Chiza Mkandawire, Brian Nyasulu and Comfort Chitseko. They spent six days in custody. The case was eventually discharged in 2011. Through their lawyers, Wapona Kita and Ralph Kasambara the group sued government for compensation. The government compensated the group in 2014 Organising Demonstrations As an activist, he is renowned for organizing demonstrations. In 2014, he led a protest against Xenophobic attacks on Malawians in South Africa. A petition was delivered to the South African High Commissioner in Lilongwe. In the same year he organized another protest against the sale of the Malawi Savings Bank. In 2016 together with the Member of Parliament Bon Kalindo he organized "Naked" protests against the ritual murders of People with Albinism.
