= Refugee Nation =

Proposal for a nation to resettle refugees

Logo of Refugee Nation

The Refugee Nation is a 2015 proposal to create a new sovereign state to voluntarily resettle the world's refugee population to solve refugee crises. According to United Nations estimates, there were about 82 million refugees and internally displaced people in the world at the time of the proposal.

== Proposal ==
Refugee Nation was launched in June 2015 by Jason Buzi and received extensive media coverage in July 2015, beginning with an article in The Washington Post.

In his proposal, Buzi offers a number of alternatives for creating a nation of refugees. These include:

1. Buying uninhabited islands from a country such as the Philippines or Indonesia.
2. A country with a lot of habitable but unused land giving away or selling this land for the purpose of establishing a refugee nation. One example given is Finland.
3. A small island nation which is sparsely populated agreeing to become a refugee nation. Current citizens would receive significant financial benefits.
4. New islands to be created in international waters as a homeland for refugees.

== Funding ==
Funding for Refugee Nation is proposed to be by governments, NGOs, the United Nations or private donations. Jason Buzi, a successful Bay Area real estate investor, had previously earned positive press as the benefactor behind 2014's Hidden Cash multi-city project. With Refugee Nation, Buzi has drafted the initial proposal, established an online presence (www.refugeenation.org), and gained exposure for his plan through a PR agency.

In October 2015, Refugee Nation launched a crowdfunding campaign with the aim of raising billions of dollars to buy land or islands as a permanent home for the world's refugees.

== Symbols proposed for the nation ==
Syrian refugee Yara Said designed a red-orange flag, resembling the life vests of Mediterranean refugees; fellow Syrian refugee Moutaz Arian created an anthem. Although neither of those could be allowed by the International Olympic Committee for the use by the Refugee Olympic Team at the 2016 Summer Olympics, some of the supporters used the flag unofficially.

Yara Said described the flag as "if you’ve worn a lifejacket as a refugee, you will feel something when you see this flag...It’s a powerful memory."

In June 2021, an emoji of the flag was made available on WhatsApp for Android and iOS.

Yara Said's refugee flag design

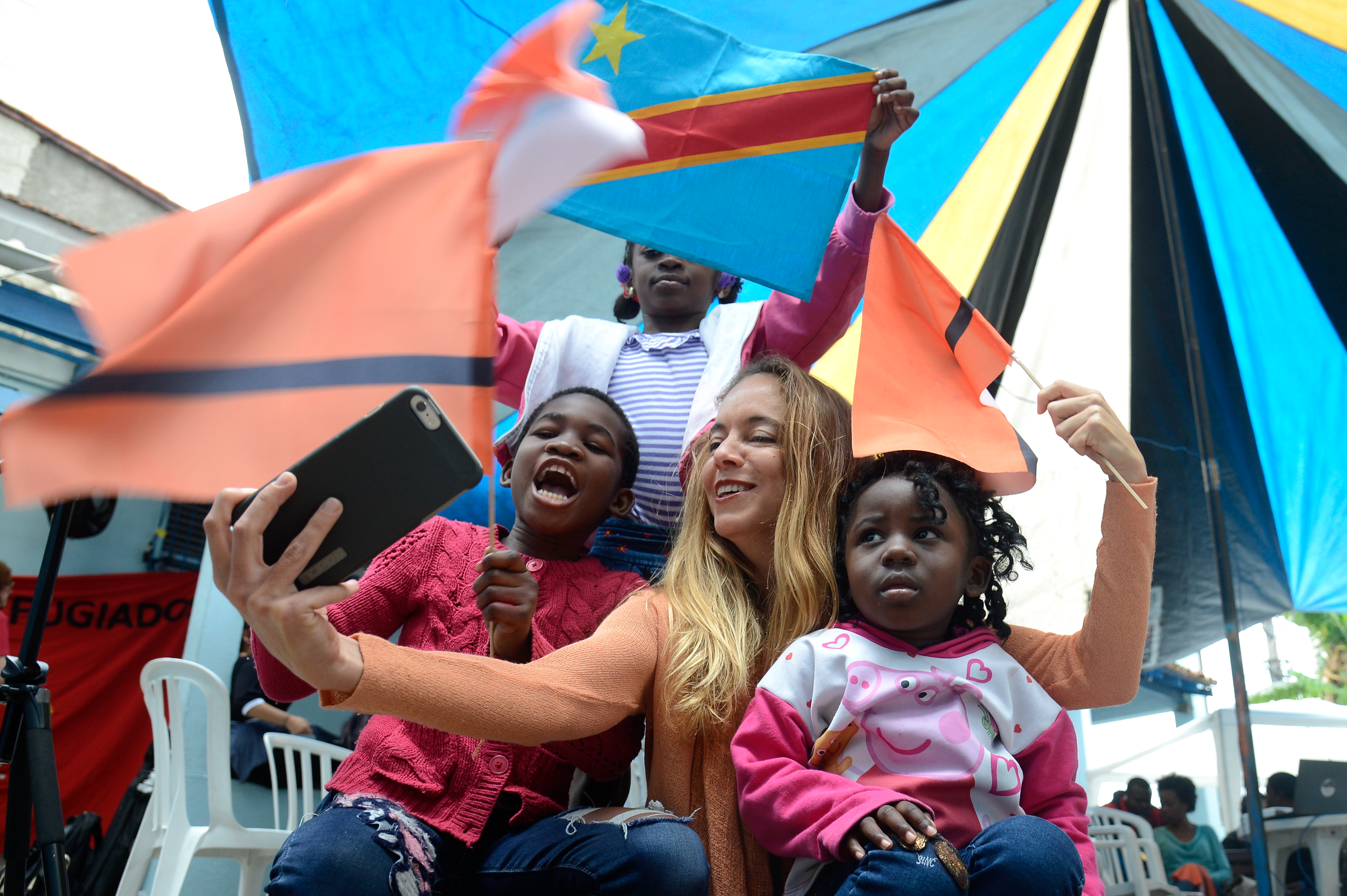
Unofficial use of the Refugee Nation flag at the 2016 Summer Olympics

== Other related proposals ==
Less than two months after the proposal received wide media coverage, Naguib Sawiris, an Egyptian billionaire, offered to buy a Mediterranean island to house refugees fleeing the Syrian conflict.

== See also ==
- Refugee Olympic Team
- Refugee Paralympic Team
