= Malawi at the 2019 World Aquatics Championships =

- Flag of Malawi
- FINA code: MAW
- National federation: Malawi Aquatic Union

in Gwangju, South Korea
- Competitors: 4 in 1 sport
- Medals: Gold 0 Silver 0 Bronze 0 Total 0

World Aquatics Championships appearances
- 1973; 1975; 1978; 1982; 1986; 1991; 1994; 1998; 2001; 2003; 2005; 2007; 2009; 2011; 2013; 2015; 2017; 2019; 2022; 2023; 2024

Malawi competed at the 2019 World Aquatics Championships in Gwangju, South Korea from 12 to 28 July.

== Swimming ==
Malawi entered four swimmers.

Men

Athlete	Event	Heat		Semifinal		Final	
Athlete	Event	Time	Rank	Time	Rank	Time	Rank
Filipe Gomes	50 m freestyle	24.16	=76	did not advance			
Filipe Gomes	100 m breaststroke	1:07.51	77	did not advance			
Michael Swift	100 m freestyle	1:02.55	115	did not advance			
Michael Swift	50 m butterfly	29.60	85	did not advance			

Women

Athlete	Event	Heat		Semifinal		Final	
Athlete	Event	Time	Rank	Time	Rank	Time	Rank
Tayarnika Chang'Anamuno	100 m freestyle	1:13.46	89	did not advance			
Tayarnika Chang'Anamuno	50 m backstroke	38.49	47	did not advance			
Ammara Pinto	50 m freestyle	29.98	=81	did not advance			
Ammara Pinto	100 m backstroke	1:16.68	61	did not advance			
