= Malawi at the 2022 World Aquatics Championships =

- Flag of Malawi
- FINA code: MAW
- National federation: Malawi Aquatic Union

in Budapest, Hungary
- Competitors: 3 in 1 sport
- Medals: Gold 0 Silver 0 Bronze 0 Total 0

World Aquatics Championships appearances
- 1973; 1975; 1978; 1982; 1986; 1991; 1994; 1998; 2001; 2003; 2005; 2007; 2009; 2011; 2013; 2015; 2017; 2019; 2022; 2023; 2024

Malawi competed at the 2022 World Aquatics Championships in Budapest, Hungary from 18 June to 3 July.

== Swimming ==
Malawian swimmers have achieved qualifying standards in the following events.

Athlete	Event	Heat		Semifinal		Final	
Athlete	Event	Time	Rank	Time	Rank	Time	Rank
Asher Banda	Men's 50 m freestyle	28.30	88	did not advance			
Asher Banda	Men's 100 m freestyle	1:03.72	96	did not advance			
Filipe Gomes	Men's 50 m breaststroke	DSQ		did not advance			
Filipe Gomes	Men's 100 m breaststroke	1:06.57	56	did not advance			
Tayarnika Chang'Anamuno	Women's 50 m freestyle	30.81	72	did not advance			
Tayarnika Chang'Anamuno	Women's 100 m freestyle	1:14.96	61	did not advance			
