= Yvonne Mhango =

Malawian economist

- Born: 1980 (age 45–46); Malawi
- Education: University of Cape Town (Bachelor of Business Science) (Master of Business Science)
- Occupation: Economist
- Years active: 2005 — present
- Known for: Economic analysis and forecasting
- Title: Sub-Saharan Africa Economist; Renaissance Capital

Yvonne Mhango is a Malawian economist. She is the economist for Sub-Saharan Africa at Renaissance Capital.

== Background and education ==
She attended Saint Andrews International High School in Blantyre, Malawi, where she studied Mathematics, Geography and Economics at A-Level, from 1996 until 1998. She was then admitted to the University of Cape Town in 1999, graduating with a Bachelor of Business Science in 2002. From 2003 until 2004, she studied at the same university, graduating with a Master of Business Science.

== Career ==
From 2005 until 2008, Mhango was an economist at Standard Bank of South Africa. In June 2008, she became the head of economic research for Africa at Standard Bank, serving in that capacity until November 2010. Since November 2010, she has been the economist for sub-Saharan Africa at Renaissance Capital.

In June 2016, following the Central Bank of Nigeria's decision to allow the niara to freely float against other currencies, Mhango said that floating the naira freely would "release a pressure valve for the economy", which would in turn "see the economy beginning to thaw and green shoots emerge possibly as soon as a year from now". Mhango, with others had correctly predicted such a devaluation in the naira, following the flotation of the Kazakhstan currency in August 2015.

In October 2016, Mhango and other economists at Renaissance Capital said that the Kenya Shilling was about 20 percent overvalued and that this was hurting Kenya's exports to other countries in the region.

== Other achievements ==
Yvonne Mhango is a co-author of the book The Fastest Billion, about Africa's economic revolution.

== See also ==
- List of banks in South Africa
