= Lillian Koreia =

Malawian fashion designer

- Born: Lillian Koreia Mpasta; Malawi
- Occupation: Fashion Designer

Lillian Koreia (born Lillian Koreia Mpasfa) is a Malawian fashion designer and entrepreneur best known as the creator of fashion brand Miizu, which was founded in 2013 and launched in Blantyre in 2014. She mixes local and international fabrics to create everyday wear for Malawian women. The fashion brand, Miizu means “roots” which is indicative of the designs which are rooted in the experiences of Malawian everyday living. She focuses on striking styles that have a diverse utility. It focuses on off the rack ready-to-wear fashion. Miizu opened its first store in 2014 in Blantyre and is looking to expand to other parts of the country. She represented Malawi at Africa Fashion Week, London in 2015.

== Background ==
She went to Saint Andrews International High School and then to college in London at University of Brighton, where she studied Business Studies & Law. She then did her master's degree in entrepreneurial management at European Business School. She is the daughter of business entrepreneur, Jimmy Koreia Mpatsa.

== Fashion shows ==
- African Fashion Week London 2015 – “Broken Pieces Collection”
- Malawi at 50 Fashion Show, Washington DC 2015
