= Ammara Pinto =

Malawian swimmer (born 1997)

Personal information
- Born: September 14, 1997 (age 28) Blantyre, Malawi

Sport
- Sport: Swimming

Ammara Pinto (born 14 September 1997) is a Malawian swimmer. She has represented Malawi at the 2016 Summer Olympics and the World Aquatics Championships.

== Early life ==
Pinto was born on 14 September 1997 in Blantyre. Her sister Zahra Pinto is also an Olympic swimmer and represented Malawi at the 2008 Summer Olympics. She attended Saint Andrews International High School, which was also the alma mater of swimmer Joyce Tafatatha.

== Swimming career ==
=== Olympics ===
Pinto competed at the 2016 Summer Olympics in the women's 50 metre freestyle event. Her time of 30.32 seconds in the heats did not qualify her for the semifinals.

=== World Aquatics Championships ===
Pinto represented Malawi at the 2017 World Aquatics Championships in Budapest, Hungary. She placed 73rd in the 50 metre freestyle event with a time of 30.59 seconds and placed last in the 100 metre backstroke event with a time of 1:20.95. Her coach attributed her last-place finish to stress caused by the high level of competition.

In 2019, she represented Malawi at the 2019 World Aquatics Championships held in Gwangju, South Korea. She competed in the women's 50 metre freestyle and women's 100 metre backstroke events. She placed 81st in the former event with a time of 29.98 seconds and 61st in the latter with a time of 1:16.68.
