= List of countries by past GDP growth =

This is a list of countries by past GDP growth. The list is split into the following decades: 1980s, 1990s, and 2000s. Each decade lists 20 countries with the largest share of contribution to global economic growth in GDP, both nominal and PPP.

== 1980s ==
In the 1980s, the European Economic Community and the United States lead expansion. At exchange rates, the global economic output expanded by US$11.5 trillion from 1980 to 1990. The five largest contributors to global output contraction are Argentina, Saudi Arabia, Nigeria, the Democratic Republic of the Congo, and Venezuela. At purchasing power parity, the global economic output expanded by US$13.7 trillion from 1980 to 1990. The following two tables are lists of the 20 largest contributors to global economic growth from 1980 to 1990 by International Monetary Fund.

List of the 20 countries with the largest share of contribution to global economic growth in GDP (1980s)

Country	Contribution (nominal)
European Union	29.7%
United States	27.1%
Japan	6.3%
West Germany	5.8%
Italy	5.8%
France	5.0%
United Kingdom	4.2%
Canada	2.8%
Brazil	2.7%
Spain	2.6%
South Korea	1.9%
Australia	1.4%
India	1.3%
Switzerland	1.1%
Netherlands	1.1%
Taiwan	1.1%
Sweden	1.0%
Turkey	0.9%
China	0.8%
Finland	0.8%
Austria	0.7%
Remaining Countries	14.0%

Country	Contribution (PPP)
European Union	24.8%
United States	22.7%
Japan	9.9%
China	5.8%
West Germany	5.4%
India	4.6%
France	3.9%
Italy	3.8%
United Kingdom	3.3%
Brazil	3.0%
Mexico	2.3%
Indonesia	2.3%
Spain	2.2%
Canada	2.0%
South Korea	1.8%
Turkey	1.6%
Iran	1.4%
Australia	1.2%
Thailand	1.2%
Netherlands	1.1%
Taiwan	1.0%
Remaining Countries	19.6%

== 1990s ==
In the 1990s, the United States dominates expansion. At exchange rates, the global economic output expanded by US$10.4 trillion from 1990 to 2000. At purchasing power parity, the global economic output expanded by US$22.0 trillion from 1990 to 2000.

List of the 20 countries with the largest share of contribution to global economic growth in GDP (1990s)

Country	Contribution (nominal)
United States	41.6%
Japan	15.7%
European Union	14.6%
China	7.6%
United Kingdom	4.6%
Mexico	3.7%
Germany	3.3%
South Korea	2.7%
Brazil	1.7%
Argentina	1.6%
Taiwan	1.6%
India	1.4%
Canada	1.4%
Poland	1.1%
Netherlands	0.9%
France	0.9%
British Hong Kong	0.9%
Saudi Arabia	0.8%
Australia	0.7%
Israel	0.7%
Venezuela	0.7%
Remaining Countries	6.3%

Country	Contribution (PPP)
United States	19.5%
European Union	19.1%
China	11.4%
India	5.1%
Japan	4.0%
Germany	3.4%
United Kingdom	2.6%
France	2.6%
Brazil	2.5%
Mexico	2.3%
Italy	2.2%
South Korea	2.0%
Indonesia	1.9%
Spain	1.7%
Canada	1.6%
Turkey	1.3%
Iran	1.2%
Taiwan	1.2%
Saudi Arabia	1.0%
Australia	1.0%
Netherlands	1.0%
Remaining Countries	30.5%

== 2000s ==
In the 2000s, there is a rise of developing and emerging economies. At exchange rates, the global economic output expanded by US$32.0 trillion from 2000 to 2010. At purchasing power parity, the global economic output expanded by US$39.1 trillion from 2000 to 2010. IMF's economic outlook for 2010 noted that banks faced a "wall" of maturing debt, which presents important risks for the normalization of credit conditions. There has been little progress in lengthening the maturity of their funding and, as a result, over $4 trillion in debt is due to be refinanced in the next 2 years.`

While there have been some encouraging signs of economic recovery, especially in the United States, the global economic growth seems to be losing momentum. According to the IMF's World Economic Outlook report published in April 2012, "global growth is projected to drop from about 4 percent in 2011 to about 3½ percent in 2012 because of weak activity during the second half of 2011 and the first half of 2012." The following two tables are lists of the 20 largest contributors to global economic growth from 2000 to 2010 by International Monetary Fund.

List of the 20 countries with the largest share of contribution to global economic growth in GDP (2000s)

Country	Contribution (nominal)
European Union	25.0%
China	14.9%
United States	14.6%
Brazil	4.8%
Germany	4.6%
France	4.0%
Russia	4.0%
India	3.8%
Italy	3.1%
Canada	2.7%
United Kingdom	2.7%
Australia	2.7%
Spain	2.6%
Japan	2.4%
Indonesia	1.8%
South Korea	1.7%
Turkey	1.5%
Netherlands	1.3%
Mexico	1.1%
Iran	1.1%
Saudi Arabia	1.1%
Remaining Countries	23.6%

Country	Contribution (PPP)
China	21.7%
European Union	13.1%
United States	12.0%
India	8.4%
Russia	3.8%
Brazil	3.1%
Japan	2.8%
Indonesia	2.7%
Germany	2.2%
United Kingdom	1.8%
South Korea	1.8%
France	1.7%
Iran	1.7%
Saudi Arabia	1.6%
Mexico	1.5%
Turkey	1.4%
Spain	1.3%
Nigeria	1.3%
Italy	1.1%
Canada	1.1%
Taiwan	1.1%
Remaining Countries	26.1%

== Other ==
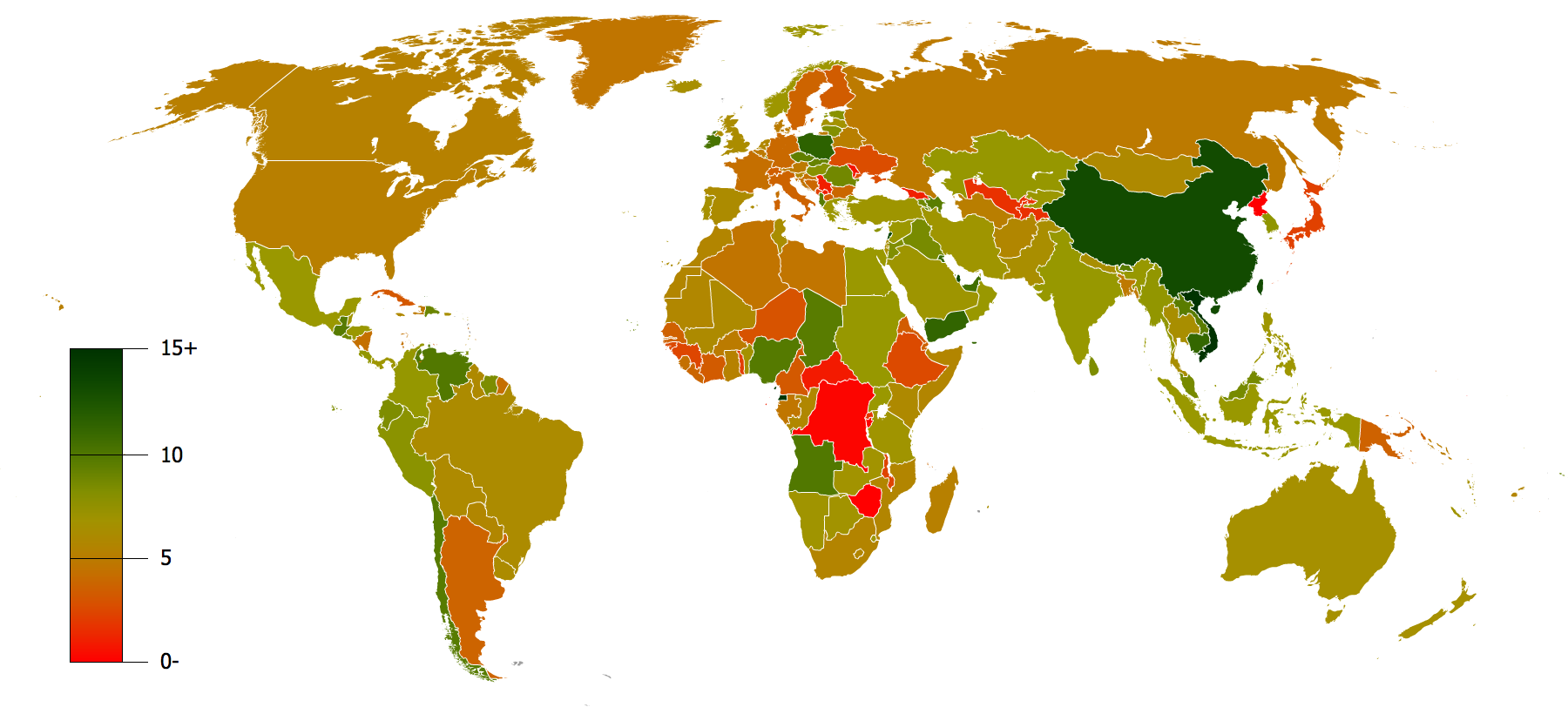
GDP growth (annualized)

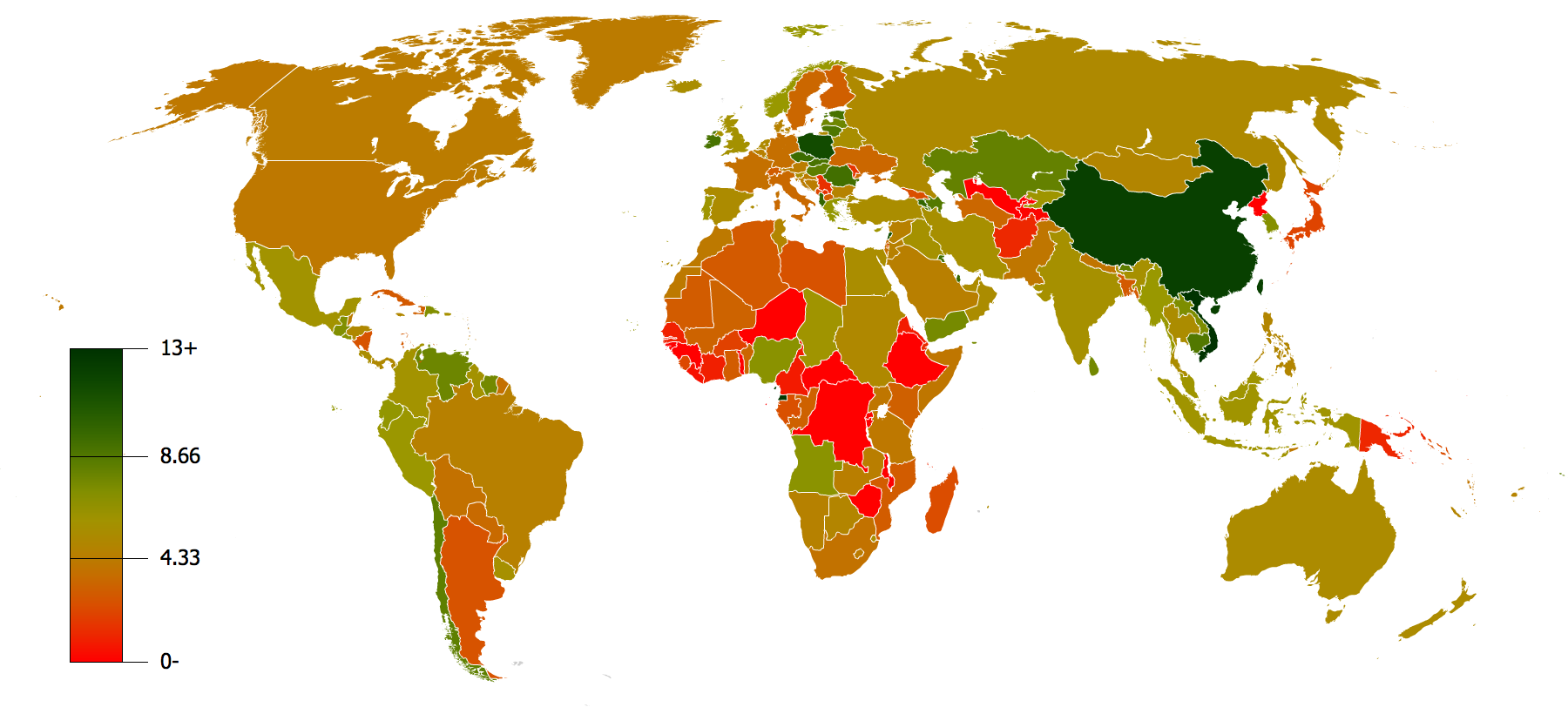
GDP per capita growth (annualized)

The two maps and the table below are for the years 1990–2015, and are based on the data obtained from the United Nations Statistics Division. 1990 was chosen as a starting year as several new states appeared at that time.

GDP per capita annualized growth rates 1990–2015
Country / territory	GDP (billions USD)		Annual GDP growth	Population (millions)		Annual GDP per capita growth
Country / territory	1990	2015	Annual GDP growth	1990	2015	Annual GDP per capita growth
Equatorial Guinea	0.13	13.18	20.2%	0.34	1.18	14.3%
China	398.62	11,226.19	14.3%	1,128.67	1,397.03	13.3%
Vietnam	6.47	191.29	14.5%	66.17	93.57	12.9%
Nicaragua	0.52	12.61	13.6%	4.14	6.08	11.9%
Timor-Leste	0.15	3.10	13.0%	0.74	1.24	10.7%
Cambodia	0.90	18.08	12.8%	9.70	15.52	10.7%
Lebanon	2.80	49.91	12.2%	2.97	5.85	9.2%
Maldives	0.23	4.00	12.1%	0.22	0.42	9.1%
Myanmar	5.18	59.49	10.3%	40.15	52.40	9.1%
Turkmenistan	3.07	35.80	10.3%	3.67	5.57	8.5%
Poland	62.08	477.35	8.5%	38.11	38.27	8.5%
Sri Lanka	9.47	80.41	8.9%	17.11	20.71	8.1%
Suriname	0.54	4.83	9.2%	0.40	0.55	7.8%
Costa Rica	5.72	55.41	9.5%	3.08	4.81	7.6%
Tanzania	3.43	45.63	10.9%	24.81	53.88	7.5%
Dominican Republic	8.00	68.90	9.0%	7.29	10.53	7.4%
Armenia	2.16	10.55	6.6%	3.54	2.92	7.4%
Panama	5.63	54.32	9.5%	2.41	3.97	7.3%
Azerbaijan	6.51	50.84	8.6%	7.21	9.62	7.3%
Haiti	0.99	8.67	9.1%	7.11	10.71	7.3%
Kazakhstan	29.66	184.39	7.6%	16.53	17.75	7.3%
Albania	2.22	11.39	6.8%	3.29	2.92	7.3%
Chile	33.00	243.96	8.3%	13.18	17.76	7.0%
Romania	38.76	177.90	6.3%	23.21	19.88	6.9%
Iraq	17.17	177.72	9.8%	18.51	36.12	6.9%
Lithuania	9.92	41.53	5.9%	3.70	2.93	6.9%
Ecuador	12.24	99.29	8.7%	10.27	16.14	6.8%
Slovakia	16.57	87.55	6.9%	5.26	5.44	6.7%
Laos	1.74	14.36	8.8%	4.08	6.66	6.7%
Bhutan	0.28	2.03	8.2%	0.55	0.79	6.6%
Guatemala	7.11	63.77	9.2%	8.91	16.25	6.6%
Czech Republic	37.04	186.83	6.7%	10.30	10.60	6.6%
Paraguay	4.90	36.16	8.3%	4.25	6.64	6.4%
Estonia	5.68	22.58	5.7%	1.57	1.32	6.4%
Uruguay	10.27	53.28	6.8%	3.11	3.43	6.4%
Peru	28.32	191.60	7.9%	21.76	31.38	6.4%
Guyana	0.65	3.20	6.6%	0.73	0.77	6.3%
Ireland	48.18	290.83	7.5%	3.51	4.70	6.2%
Kyrgyzstan	1.11	6.68	7.4%	4.39	5.87	6.2%
Indonesia	138.26	860.74	7.6%	183.59	258.16	6.1%
Singapore	38.90	304.09	8.6%	3.02	5.54	6.0%
Bolivia	4.87	33.24	8.0%	6.67	10.72	6.0%
Trinidad and Tobago	5.16	24.26	6.4%	1.22	1.36	5.9%
India	326.61	2,102.39	7.7%	860.20	1,309.05	5.9%
South Korea	279.35	1,382.76	6.6%	42.87	50.59	5.9%
Qatar	7.36	161.74	13.2%	0.47	2.48	5.8%
Nigeria	62.17	493.84	8.6%	94.45	181.18	5.8%
Bangladesh	35.38	208.32	7.3%	113.05	161.20	5.8%
Latvia	8.86	26.99	4.6%	2.66	1.99	5.8%
Liberia	0.38	3.16	8.8%	2.14	4.50	5.6%
El Salvador	4.82	23.17	6.5%	5.11	6.31	5.6%
Samoa	0.18	0.80	6.2%	0.16	0.19	5.5%
Eritrea	0.76	4.44	7.3%	3.16	4.85	5.5%
Malaysia	46.58	301.79	7.8%	18.10	30.72	5.5%
Colombia	55.88	293.49	6.9%	34.87	48.23	5.5%
Hungary	34.36	122.82	5.2%	10.36	9.78	5.5%
Saint Kitts and Nevis	0.20	0.94	6.3%	0.04	0.05	5.4%
Nepal	3.89	21.41	7.1%	19.11	28.66	5.3%
Mauritius	2.71	11.69	6.0%	1.06	1.26	5.3%
Philippines	49.10	292.77	7.4%	61.23	101.72	5.2%
Thailand	88.47	401.37	6.2%	54.29	68.66	5.2%
Malta	2.55	10.57	5.9%	0.36	0.43	5.1%
Kuwait	18.29	114.61	7.6%	2.14	3.94	5.0%
Belarus	18.83	56.33	4.5%	10.26	9.49	4.8%
Jordan	4.16	37.57	9.2%	3.25	9.16	4.8%
Angola	13.74	116.19	8.9%	10.53	27.86	4.8%
Venezuela	48.39	242.60	6.7%	19.73	31.16	4.7%
Hong Kong	76.93	309.36	5.7%	5.70	7.25	4.7%
Cape Verde	0.34	1.60	6.4%	0.36	0.53	4.7%
Argentina	153.21	642.46	5.9%	32.58	43.42	4.7%
Grenada	0.28	1.00	5.2%	0.10	0.11	4.7%
Bulgaria	19.77	50.20	3.8%	8.82	7.18	4.7%
Pakistan	52.43	270.56	6.8%	112.99	189.38	4.6%
Luxembourg	12.68	57.81	6.3%	0.38	0.57	4.6%
Turkey	207.38	859.45	5.9%	57.34	78.27	4.5%
Uzbekistan	14.71	66.49	6.2%	20.52	30.98	4.5%
Seychelles	0.37	1.38	5.4%	0.07	0.09	4.5%
Solomon Islands	0.21	1.16	7.1%	0.31	0.59	4.4%
Israel	58.08	299.09	6.8%	4.51	8.06	4.3%
Brazil	455.17	1,800.02	5.7%	149.52	205.96	4.3%
Saudi Arabia	117.47	654.27	7.1%	16.26	31.56	4.3%
Palau	0.08	0.29	5.5%	0.01	0.02	4.3%
New Zealand	45.77	175.77	5.5%	3.41	4.61	4.3%
Mongolia	3.13	11.75	5.4%	2.22	2.98	4.2%
Honduras	4.17	20.98	6.7%	4.89	8.96	4.1%
Taiwan	166.85	525.60	4.7%	20.31	23.49	4.1%
Australia	323.43	1,232.91	5.5%	16.87	23.80	4.1%
Mexico	290.40	1,170.57	5.7%	84.00	125.89	4.0%
Fiji	1.34	4.34	4.8%	0.72	0.89	4.0%
Norway	119.79	386.66	4.8%	4.24	5.20	3.9%
Vanuatu	0.17	0.77	6.3%	0.15	0.26	3.9%
Ethiopia	12.60	64.68	6.8%	51.15	99.87	3.9%
Zambia	4.09	21.24	6.8%	8.12	16.10	3.9%
Kenya	12.18	64.24	6.9%	23.45	47.24	3.9%
Dominica	0.20	0.54	4.0%	0.07	0.07	3.9%
Chad	1.83	10.95	7.4%	6.11	14.01	3.9%
Lesotho	0.67	2.35	5.2%	1.60	2.17	3.9%
Oman	11.69	68.92	7.4%	1.84	4.20	3.9%
Kiribati	0.04	0.17	5.6%	0.07	0.11	3.8%
Bosnia and Herzegovina	7.75	16.21	3.0%	4.31	3.54	3.8%
Sierra Leone	0.95	4.25	6.2%	4.09	7.24	3.8%
Jamaica	4.66	14.15	4.5%	2.37	2.87	3.7%
Russia	569.71	1,368.40	3.6%	148.61	143.89	3.7%
United States	5,963.13	18,219.30	4.6%	256.10	319.93	3.6%
Namibia	2.84	11.78	5.9%	1.42	2.43	3.6%
Morocco	30.18	101.18	5.0%	25.03	34.80	3.6%
Portugal	79.45	199.52	3.8%	9.98	10.42	3.6%
Saint Lucia	0.52	1.62	4.7%	0.14	0.18	3.6%
Tonga	0.15	0.41	4.1%	0.09	0.11	3.5%
Botswana	3.80	14.45	5.5%	1.37	2.21	3.5%
Tunisia	13.47	43.15	4.8%	8.22	11.27	3.5%
Djibouti	0.46	1.73	5.5%	0.56	0.93	3.3%
Georgia	8.53	14.00	2.0%	5.46	3.95	3.3%
Barbados	2.02	4.73	3.4%	0.27	0.28	3.3%
Bahrain	4.97	31.13	7.6%	0.49	1.37	3.3%
Slovenia	17.85	43.09	3.6%	1.93	2.07	3.3%
Belize	0.41	1.78	6.0%	0.19	0.36	3.3%
Papua New Guinea	4.84	20.64	6.0%	4.13	7.92	3.2%
San Marino	0.56	1.52	4.1%	0.02	0.03	3.2%
Switzerland	258.02	679.72	4.0%	6.83	8.32	3.1%
Croatia	24.78	49.52	2.8%	4.52	4.24	3.1%
United Kingdom	1,191.02	2,897.06	3.6%	57.24	65.40	3.1%
Netherlands	320.84	765.65	3.5%	14.95	16.94	3.0%
Rwanda	2.49	8.29	4.9%	7.29	11.63	3.0%
Ghana	9.99	36.89	5.4%	15.58	27.58	3.0%
Syria	12.30	37.50	4.6%	12.72	18.74	3.0%
Moldova	3.97	7.61	2.6%	4.39	4.07	3.0%
Iceland	6.48	17.34	4.0%	0.25	0.33	2.9%
Germany	1,592.59	3,383.09	3.1%	79.43	81.71	2.9%
Austria	166.87	382.26	3.4%	7.73	8.68	2.9%
Egypt	96.09	332.08	5.1%	55.14	93.78	2.9%
Brunei	3.91	12.93	4.9%	0.26	0.42	2.9%
Canada	593.94	1,559.62	3.9%	27.70	35.95	2.9%
Belgium	201.22	455.27	3.3%	9.93	11.29	2.8%
Denmark	138.25	301.30	3.2%	5.14	5.69	2.7%
Benin	2.11	8.30	5.6%	5.18	10.58	2.6%
Spain	533.92	1,198.39	3.3%	38.85	46.40	2.6%
Guinea-Bissau	0.32	1.05	4.8%	1.02	1.77	2.5%
Mauritania	1.21	4.83	5.7%	1.95	4.18	2.5%
Antigua and Barbuda	0.46	1.37	4.5%	0.06	0.10	2.5%
South Africa	115.53	317.70	4.1%	36.58	55.29	2.4%
Uganda	5.74	23.50	5.8%	17.84	40.14	2.4%
Greece	97.96	195.64	2.8%	10.16	11.22	2.4%
Mali	3.22	13.11	5.8%	7.67	17.47	2.3%
Montenegro	2.15	4.06	2.6%	0.59	0.63	2.3%
Mozambique	4.13	14.80	5.2%	13.54	28.01	2.2%
France	1,272.43	2,439.44	2.6%	58.21	64.46	2.2%
Sweden	255.94	498.12	2.7%	8.56	9.76	2.2%
Algeria	61.89	165.98	4.0%	25.28	39.87	2.1%
Tajikistan	2.87	7.86	4.1%	5.30	8.55	2.1%
Ivory Coast	10.80	33.13	4.6%	12.78	23.11	2.1%
Yemen	12.64	45.59	5.3%	12.31	26.92	2.0%
Burkina Faso	3.10	10.43	5.0%	8.87	18.11	2.0%
Cyprus	6.00	19.69	4.9%	0.58	1.16	2.0%
Comoros	0.25	0.59	3.5%	0.53	0.78	1.9%
Madagascar	3.08	9.74	4.7%	12.03	24.23	1.8%
São Tomé and Príncipe	0.12	0.32	3.9%	0.12	0.20	1.7%
Italy	1,170.29	1,833.79	1.8%	56.72	59.50	1.6%
Finland	141.80	232.58	2.0%	4.99	5.48	1.6%
United Arab Emirates	49.09	358.14	8.3%	1.87	9.15	1.6%
Burundi	1.13	3.01	4.0%	5.69	10.20	1.6%
Republic of the Congo	2.80	8.55	4.6%	2.42	5.00	1.6%
Senegal	7.24	17.78	3.7%	7.90	14.98	1.0%
Cameroon	13.55	30.93	3.4%	12.24	22.83	0.8%
Zimbabwe	8.78	16.07	2.4%	10.49	15.78	0.8%
Guinea	3.71	8.79	3.5%	6.03	12.09	0.7%
Ukraine	90.21	90.94	0.0%	51.54	44.66	0.6%
Malawi	3.00	6.40	3.1%	9.45	17.57	0.6%
Niger	2.48	7.22	4.4%	7.82	19.90	0.5%
Togo	2.06	4.18	2.9%	3.96	7.42	0.3%
Gabon	6.34	14.39	3.3%	0.92	1.93	0.3%
Serbia	33.86	37.16	0.4%	7.90	8.85	–0.1%
Gambia	0.75	1.37	2.4%	0.96	1.98	–0.5%
Iran	575.27	375.40	–1.7%	56.67	79.36	–3.0%
DR Congo	41.45	38.40	–0.3%	37.94	76.20	–3.0%
North Macedonia	4.27	10.07	3.5%			
Libya	30.64	17.19	–2.3%	4.36	6.24	–3.7%
Cuba	30.90			10.60	11.46	
Liechtenstein	1.42			0.03	0.04	
