= Vanessa Nsona =

Malawian fashion designer and entrepreneur

- Born: Vanessa Nsona; Malawi
- Occupation: Fashion Designer

Vanessa Nsona is a Malawian business entrepreneur and fashion designer. She is the creator of Dorovee, which is Malawi's first eco-friendly fashion accessory company. She was selected as a Mandela Washington Fellow under the Young African Leadership Initiative in Washington D.C..

As an established designer in Malawi, she mentors and trains fashion designers both in and out of the country. She has co-hosted workshops in Malawi. In Zimbabwe, she held a workshop on 'Building a Sustainable Fashion Brand' together with Zedlabel at the US embassy.

== Background ==
She holds a diploma in Business Management from University of Malawi. In 2014 Nsona was a Mandela Washington Fellow, for young African leaders, at Dartmouth College studying business. She represented Malawi at the African Youth World Heritage forum in Cape Town, South Africa.She is a member of Soroptmist International of Blantyre (SIB) which helps disadvantaged women and children. She also launched Project Luso, which creates and promotes Malawian fashion designs to help disadvantaged women and mentors talent in the fashion industry together with non-profit Samaritan Trust.

== Career ==
Nsona launched the Dorovee fashion accessory brand in 2012 which includes sandals, necklaces and other jewellery using Malawian fabric and materials. Her designs have appeared in Malawi fashion shows, including Malawi Fashion Week 2014 and at the Malawi at 50 celebrations in Washington DC. More recently, Nsona collaborated with Matamba Film Labs for Women in Zimbabwe to develop a stop motion film about the life of a young African girl.

== Media appearances ==
- Interviewee, "Executing a Business Idea", Player FM, Premier Multimedia Consultants, episode 003 & 004, 2016
- Judge, Zedlabel Fashion Challenge, fashion feature TV show, Zimbabwe, 2015
- Interviewee, "Interview with Vanessa Nsona", United Nations Foundation, 2014
