= Coat of arms of Réunion =

Versions
- Escutcheon
- Adopted: 1925

The coat of arms of Réunion represents the island and overseas departement of Réunion. This coat of arms was created by Émile Merwart in 1925 on the occasion of a colonial exhibition that was to be held in Petite-Île.

== Elements ==
- The upper left field of the shield shows mountains, one of them an erupting volcano, with the Roman numeral 'MMM' (3000), indicating the approximate height of the Piton des Neiges, which is 3069 meters.
- The upper right field portrays the ship Saint-Alexis, which arrived at the island in 1638.
- The three lilies (a symbol of the Bourbon dynasty) allude to the historical name of Réunion, Île de Bourbon, a possession of the French monarchy.
- The bees on the lower right field symbolize the historical period of the island under the domination of the First French Empire. Bees are symbols used by Napoleon Bonaparte.
- The shield in the centre represents the French tricolour with the initials RF in the middle, for République Française (French Republic).

== Logo ==
The Regional Council of Réunion uses a logo depicting a stylized representation of the island with the text "Region Reunion". Variants also exist which add the words "Valorisons nos atouts" (Let's value our strengths) in French and five coloured squares to represent equality and diversity.

== See also ==
- Flag of Réunion
