= Hidden Cash =

Multi-City project

Hidden Cash was a 2014 multi-city project founded by Jason Buzi and Yan Budman using the Twitter account of the same name.

On May 22, 2014, Hidden Cash began hiding money in San Francisco, California and tweeting out clues using the handle. Followers were encouraged to tweet a photo of themselves with the money they find, and Hidden Cash retweeted them. Within a week, the group expanded to Los Angeles, and the account gained national and international media attention, and hundreds of thousands of followers.

Over the course of about 10 weeks, Hidden Cash did money drops in California cities including San Francisco, Oakland, San Jose, Sacramento, Fresno, Los Angeles, Pasadena, Burbank, Bakersfield, Riverside, and San Diego; Las Vegas, NV; Chicago, IL; Houston, TX; New York City, and Mexico City. In Europe, Hidden Cash did events in London, Madrid, and Berlin.

Events typically consisted of the group hiding envelopes filled with money, most often between $50 and $100 in each, in various parks. In beaches in Southern California, from Los Angeles to San Diego, the group would hide money in Angry Birds toys or Pez dispensers. Pez dispensers were also used for the group's final drops at Coney Island and Brighton Beach in Brooklyn, New York.

The number of participants in every scavenger hunt type event typically ranged from 200 to over 3000. A July event at a city park in Whittier, CA resulted in $5000 worth of property damage, which the group reimbursed the city for. The group also sponsored free ice cream on July 4 at Ben and Jerry's in San Francisco, New York City, and Washington, DC. On Monday, August 4, the group bought $1000 worth of groceries for shoppers in the Bronx, NY. Hidden Cash encourages its followers to "pay it forward".

Dozens of copycat accounts have sprung up around the world, most using "Hidden Cash" as part of their name, and many doing similar events in their local area.

On August 12, 2014, Hidden Cash creators Jason Buzi and Yan Budman announced that they were discontinuing the current phase of cash drops effective immediately. Buzi stressed that although the current iteration of Hidden Cash had ended, he remained hopeful that the next phase of "fun and giving" could soon be underway. At the time of the announcement, the original Twitter account @hiddencash had 720,000 followers.

By mid-2015, Buzi clarified that Hidden Cash was not active.

As of April 2020, the Hidden Cash Twitter account had begun giving money to followers via guessing contests.

As of 2024, the Hidden Cash Twitter account had been suspended.
