= Flag icons for languages =

Using national flags as icons for languages

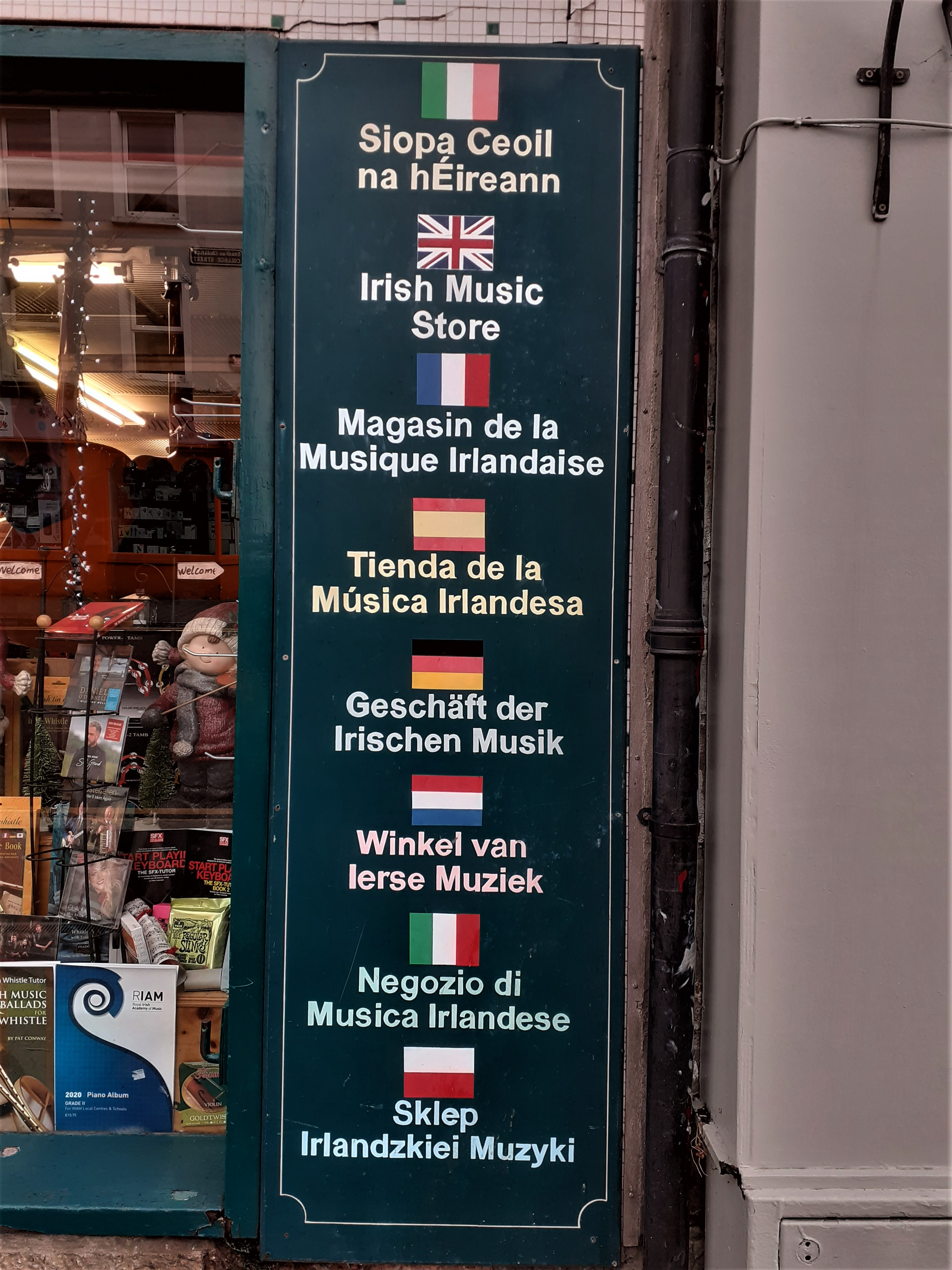
Sign in Killarney, Ireland using flag icons to represent Irish (Ireland), English (UK), French (France), Spanish (Spain), German (Germany), Dutch (Netherlands), Italian (Italy) and Polish (Poland)

The use of flag icons, particularly national flags, for languages is a common practice. Such icons have long been used on tourist attraction signage, and elsewhere in the tourism space, but have found wider use in website localization where UX limitations have become apparent.

The usage remains widespread despite problems, such as being potentially insulting, since countries and languages don't have a one-to-one correspondence. The World Wide Web Consortium suggests not using such practice, and recommends using texts instead.

== Types of flags icons ==
=== National flags ===
National flags are the most commonly used flag icons for representing languages. They are generally chosen because they either represent the language's origin (e.g. the flag of Spain used over the flag of Mexico) or the highest number of native speakers (e.g. the flag of the United States over the Flag of England or United Kingdom).

The flag of Spain is often used to represent Spanish, despite having fewer native speakers than Mexico

The flag of United States is often used to represent English, despite not being its origin (i.e. the United Kingdom)

=== Mixed national flags ===
A diagonally divided flag between two or more nation states is sometimes used when more than one country is a major user of a language. Examples of this are the flags of the United Kingdom and the United States to indicate the English language; the flags of China and Taiwan to represent Mandarin; the flags of France, Belgium, and Canada to represent the French language; the flags of Spain and Mexico to represent the Spanish language; the flags of Portugal and Brazil to represent the Portuguese language; and the flags of Germany, Austria, and Switzerland to represent the German language.

A mixed national flag of the US and the UK, representing English

A mixed national flag of France, Canada and Belgium, representing French

A mixed national flag of Spain and Mexico, representing Spanish

A mixed national flag of Portugal and Brazil, representing Portuguese

A mixed national flag of Germany, Austria and Switzerland, representing German

A mixed national flag of the Netherlands, the Belgian region of Flanders and Suriname, representing Dutch

A mixed national flag of Italy and San Marino, representing Italian

A mixed national flag of the Spanish region of Catalonia and Andorra, representing Catalan

A mixed national flag of Russia and Belarus, representing Russian

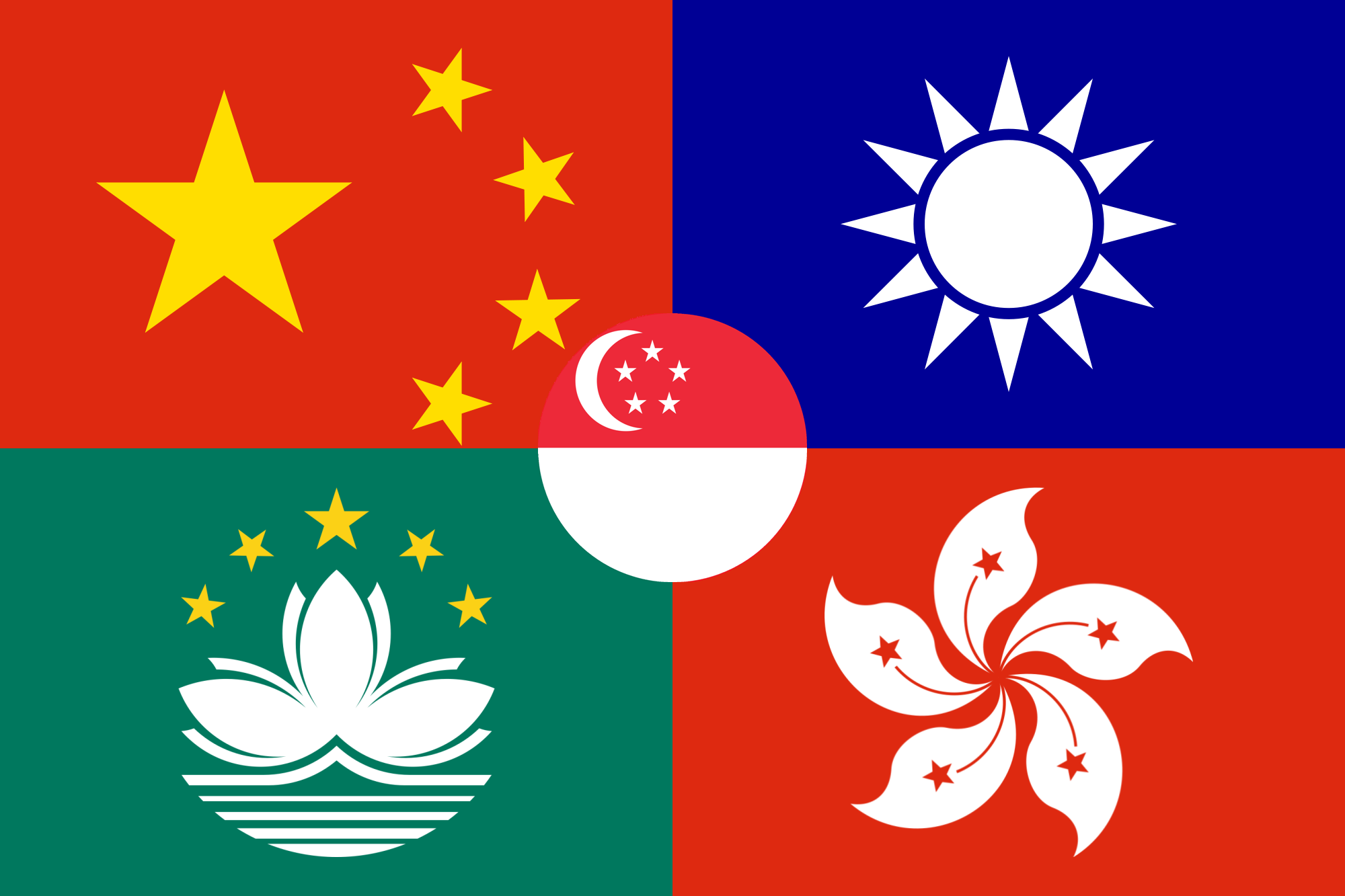
A mixed national flag of China, Taiwan, Hong Kong, Macau and Singapore, representing Chinese

=== Linguistic flags ===
Some international linguistic communities, particularly those of international auxiliary languages, have flags which encompass all the speakers of a language while avoiding the symbolism of national flags, though they are not as widely recognized.

The flag of the Arab League, representing Arabic

The Verda Stelo flag, representing Esperanto

The flag of the International Organisation of La Francophonie, representing French

The flag of the Hispanic people, representing Spanish

The flag of Ido

The flag of Interslavic

The flag of Novial

The flag of the Community of Portuguese Language Countries, representing Portuguese

The komets alef flag as used by Duolingo, representing Yiddish

== Writing systems ==
National flags can also be used to distinguish between different written standards for a single language. For example, the flag of Taiwan is often used for Traditional Chinese and the flag of the People's Republic of China for Simplified Chinese.

Flag of Taiwan, representing Traditional Chinese

Flag of China, representing Simplified Chinese

== Political motivations ==
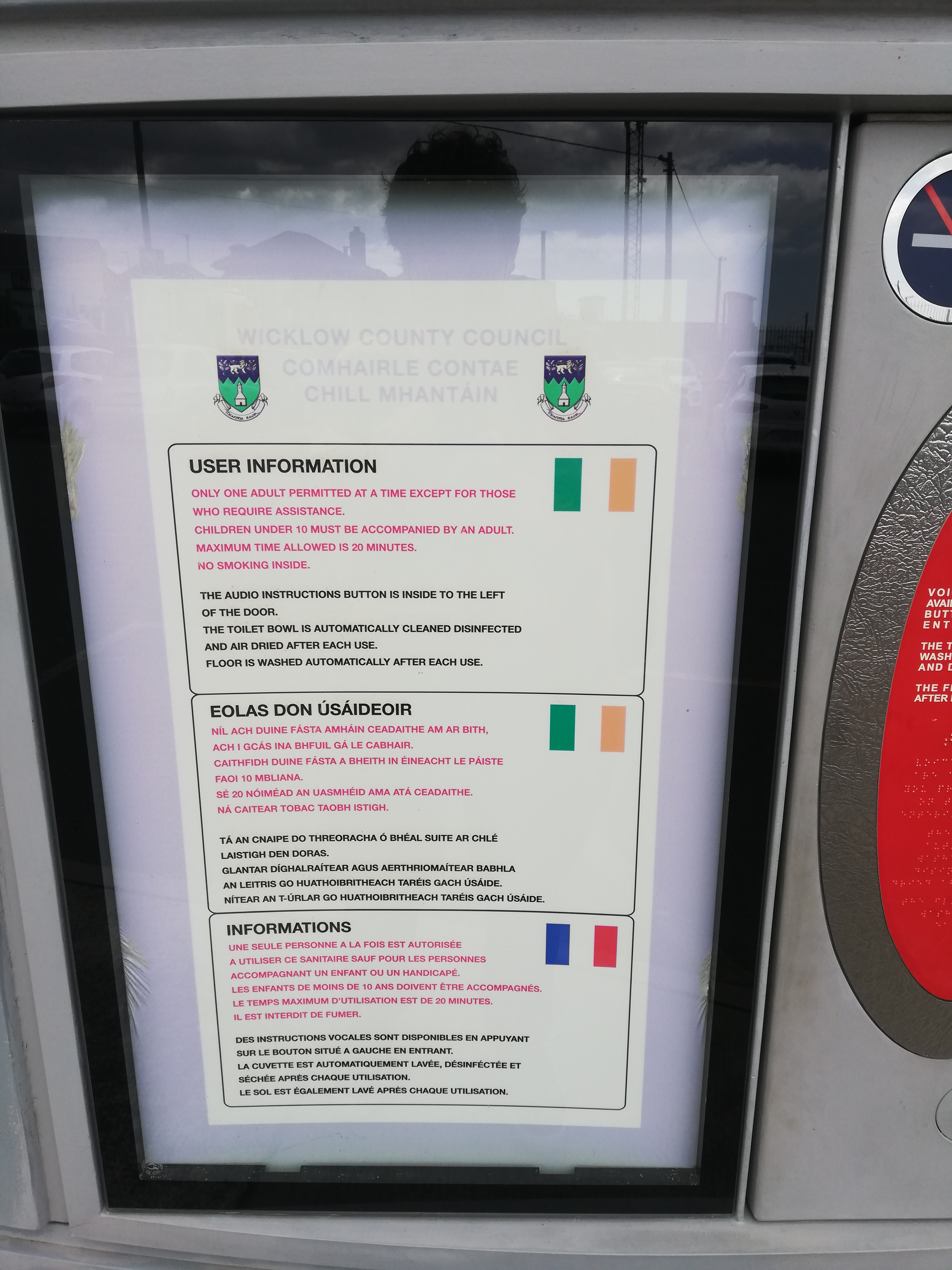
Sign in the Republic of Ireland using the Irish flag for both English and Irish

Some Euronet ATMs (automated teller machines) display the Irish flag as a symbol for the English language (usually UK flag or English flag). This was speculated to be a response to Brexit, with the Republic of Ireland as one of the only two remaining European Union member nations (along with Malta) with English among their official languages. The Irish flag is more commonly used to signify the Irish language.

== Gallery ==
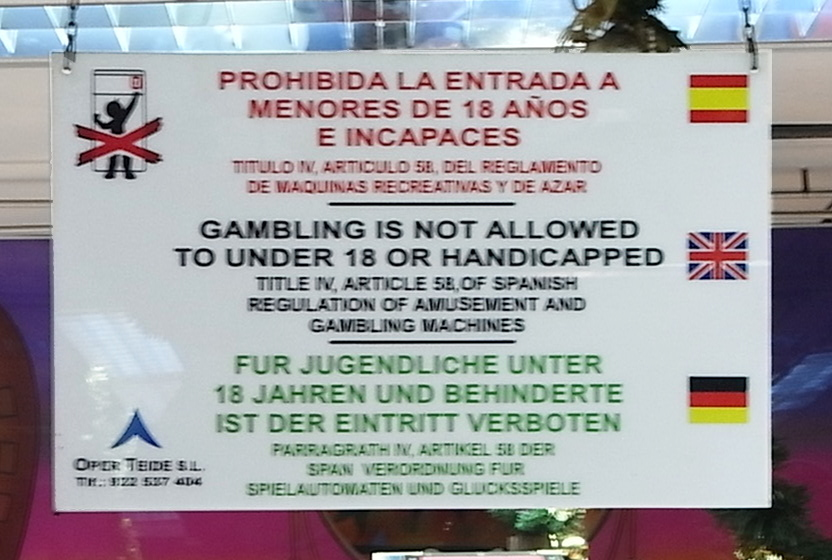
Sign in Tenerife, Spain uses for the Spanish text, (United Kingdom) for the English text and (Germany) for the German text.

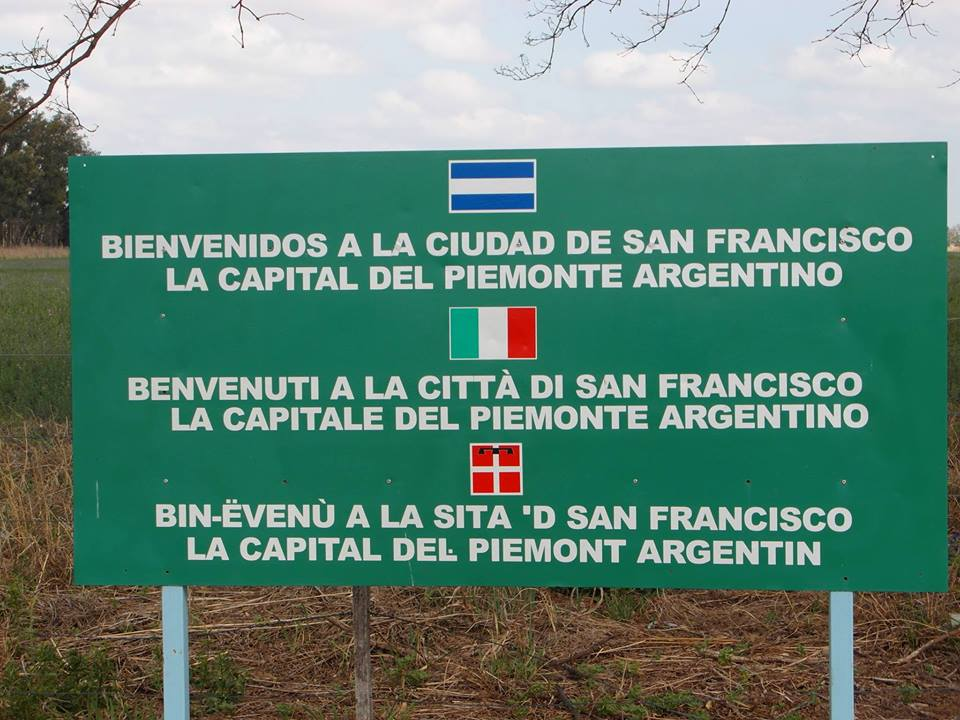
Sign in San Francisco, Córdoba, Argentina; unusually, the Spanish language is indicated by an Argentine flag, while below it is Italian and Piedmontese text with the flags of Italy and Piedmont.

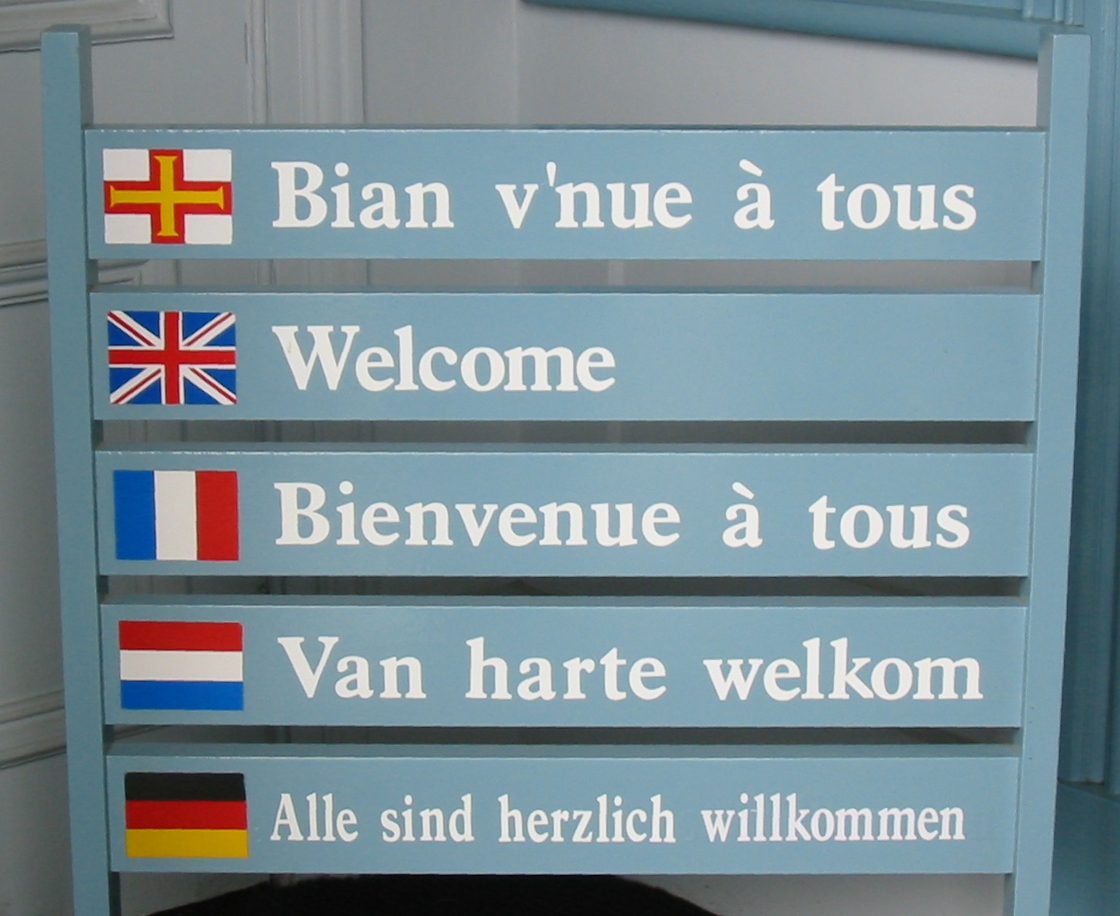
Sign in Guernsey using the Flag of Guernsey to symbolise Guernésiais.
