= Groupe d'organisation nationale de la Guadeloupe =

Guadeloupe political group

Flag

Groupe d'organisation nationale de la Guadeloupe (also known as GONG) was a political group that campaigned for Guadeloupe, an overseas region of France in the Caribbean, to have complete independence from France. Founded in Paris in 1963, by mostly male students, GONG would become one of the most significant anti-colonial groups in the territory and its diaspora. Guadeloupe remains an overseas department of France.
