= People's Union for the Liberation of Guadeloupe =

People's Union for the Liberation of Guadeloupe Union populaire pour la libération de la Guadeloupe
- General Secretary: Gaston Samut
- Founded: 1978
- Headquarters: Guadeloupe
- Ideology: Guadeloupean independence
- Political position: Far-left
- International affiliation: Baku Initiative Group

Party flag

The People's Union for the Liberation of Guadeloupe (French: Union populaire pour la libération de la Guadeloupe, UPLG) (Guadeloupean Creole: Inion popilè pou libérasyon a di la Gwadloup) is a far-left political party in the French overseas department of Guadeloupe. The UPLG advocates for the independence of Guadeloupe from France.
