= Joyce Tafatatha =

Malawian swimmer

Personal information
- Born: April 18, 1998 (age 28)

Sport
- Sport: Swimming

Joyce Feith Tafatatha (born April 18, 1998) is a Malawian athlete who specializes in swimming. She participated in the London 2012 Olympics for Malawi in the women's 50 m freestyle swimming event. She currently holds a number of swimming records in Malawi. She recently moved to the Netherlands to further her swimming career after a brilliant showing at the 2012 London Summer Olympics, in which she swam a Personal Best time of 27.74.

== Personal life ==
She began competing competitively when she was a student at Saint Andrew's International High School in Blantyre. She swam for Liyani Swimming Club based at the Saint Andrew's International High School, she competed at a national and international level for Malawi, she holds many Malawi national records. She stunned all when she broke 6 national records in the Malawi National Swimming Championships at Bishop Mackenzie International School in March 2012.

She later moved to the Netherlands to advance her swimming career.

== Events ==
=== Cana Zone IV Swimming ===
She won four medals at the Cana Swimming Games including two gold medals and a silver medal at the Cana Zone IV Swimming Championships - Mozambique.

=== 2012 Olympics ===
She was 14 when she competed in the 2012 Summer Olympics, making her and Aurelie Fanchette the two youngest competitors at the Games.
