= Flag of Réunion =

Réunion
- Flag of France
- Tricolore
- Use: National flag, civil and state ensign
- Proportion: 2:3
- Adopted: 15 February 1794
- Design: A vertical tricolour of blue, white, and red.
- Lo Mavéli
- Unofficial flag of Réunion
- Use: Unofficial flag
- Adopted: 2003
- Flag of the Regional Council of Réunion

The flag of Réunion is the flag of the department of Réunion. The region uses the flag of France, the national flag of the country. Although the decentralization of France installed a number of flags of the metropolitan regions, Réunion does not have a separate official flag. However, the Regional Council of Réunion does have a flag.

== Other flags ==
=== Lö Mahavéli ===
The flag was designed in 1974 by Guy Pignolet with help of Jean Finck and Didier Finck. The Vexillological Association of Réunion selected the flag in 2003 and further promoted its use online. It depicts the volcano of la Fournaise, bedecked by gold sunbeams.

It does not have official recognition, but since 2014 several city councils have displayed the flag outside public buildings such as the town halls of Saint-Denis and Saint-Philippe. The flag is included in many versions of emoji.

=== Independentist flag ===
An additional flag was created by Réunion independentists and nationalists in 1986. Green symbolizes the marronage, yellow symbolizes the working class and red symbolizes the period of slavery and indentured labour imposed by the French, struck by a yellow star with five points.

Flag used by Réunion nationalists

Lö Mahavéli

Proposed flag of Réunion by the Mouvman Lantant Koudmin

Flag of the Regional Council of Réunion

Former flag of the Regional Council of Réunion

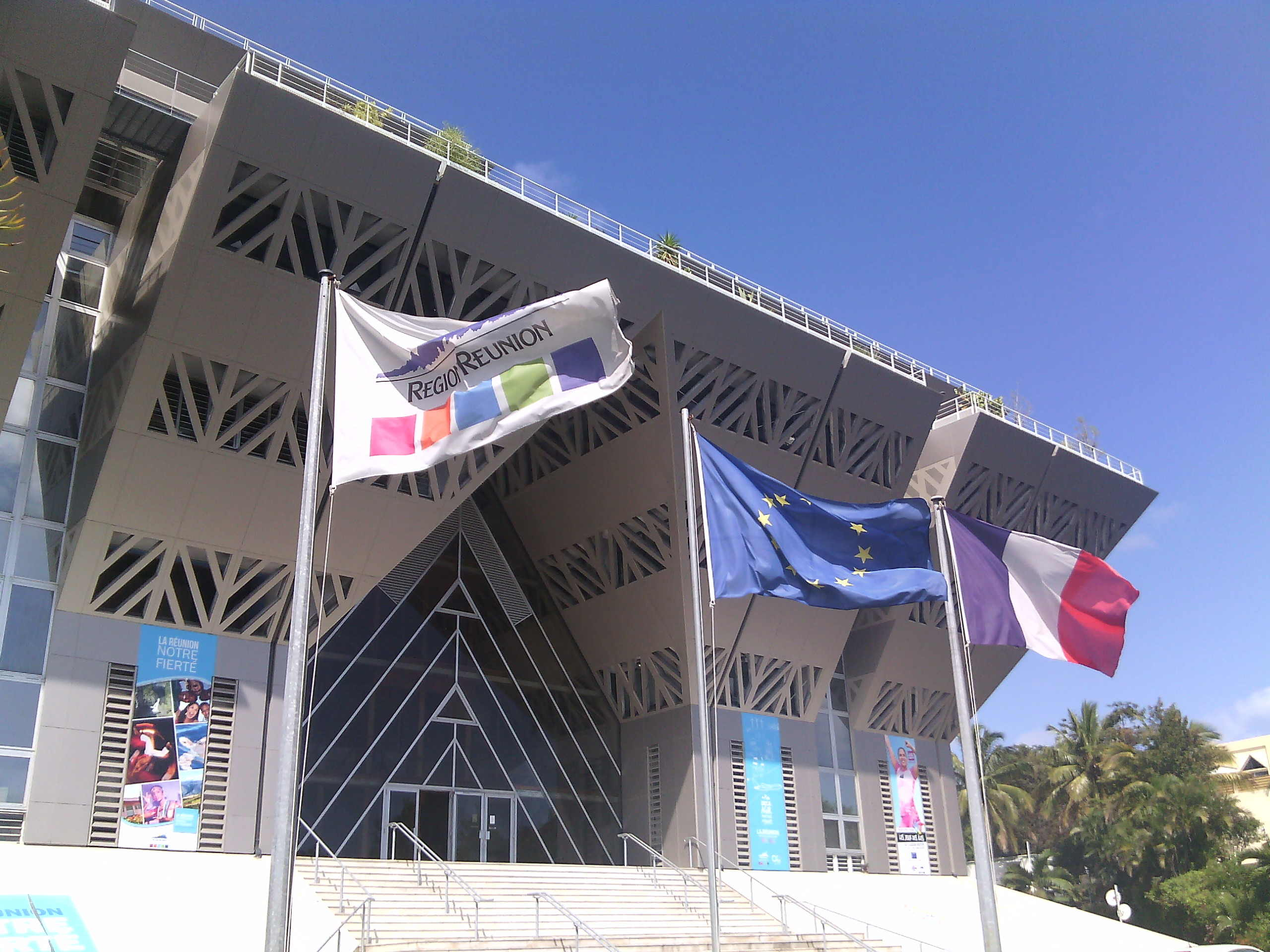
Flag of Réunion regional council, the EU and France

Proposed flag of Réunion by the Association for the Réunion Flag

== See also ==
- Coat of arms of Réunion
