= Tayamika Chang'anamuno =

Malawian national swimmer (born 2000)

Personal information
- National team: Malawi
- Born: 1 July 2000 (age 26)

Sport
- Sport: Swimming
- Strokes: Freestyle

Tayamika Chang'anamuno (born 1 July 2000) is a Malawian swimmer.

== Early life ==
Born in Lilongwe in July 2000, in 2023 she earned a four-year scholarship via the Stipendium Hungaricum Scholarship Programme at Eötvös Loránd University in Budapest.

== Career ==
Competing at the World Aquatics Championships in Budapest in 2022, she set a new personal best time for the 50 metres freestyle. Initially selected for the 2022 Commonwealth Games in Birmingham, England she was dropped from the team because the Malawian Association could only afford to take two competitors.

She competed at the delayed 2023 African Games in Accra, Ghana in March 2024.

She was selected to represent Malawi at the 2024 Paris Olympics in the 50 metres freestyle.
