= Flag of Malawi =

Republic of Malawi
- Use: National flag, civil and state ensign
- Proportion: 2:3
- Adopted: 6 July 1964; 28 May 2012 (re-adopted)
- Relinquished: 29 July 2010
- Design: A horizontal triband of black, red and green; charged with a red rising sun with 31 rays centred on the black stripe

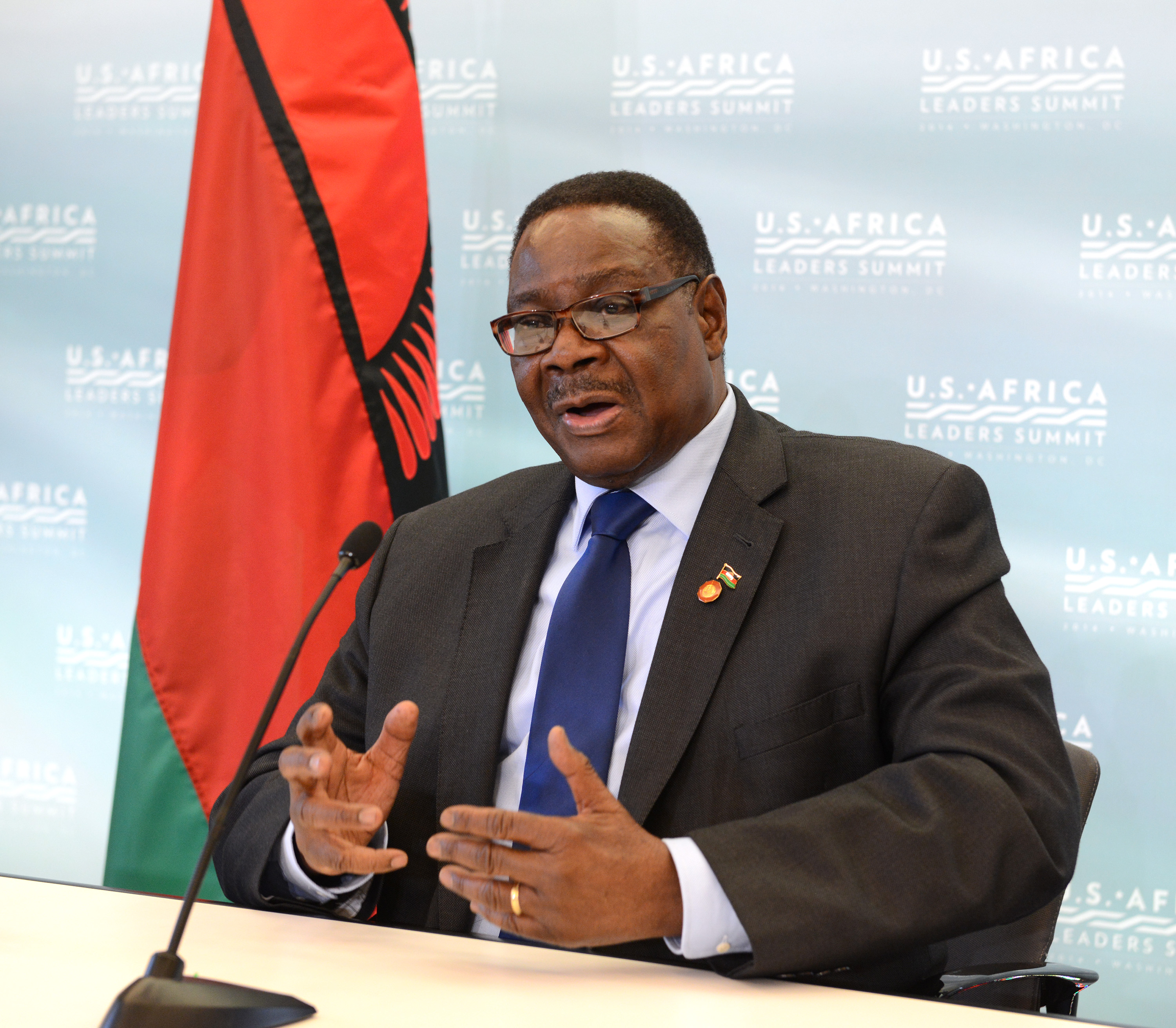
President Peter Mutharika with the flag

The national flag of Malawi (Chichewa: mbendera ya Malaŵi; Chitumbuka: mbendela ya Malaŵi) was officially adopted on 6 July 1964 when the colony of Nyasaland became independent from British rule and renamed itself Malawi.

== Design ==
The first flag of independent Malawi was adopted on 6 July 1964. A rising sun against a black field is also present in the coat of arms of Malawi and in the flag it officially represents the dawn of hope and freedom for the continent of Africa (when the flag was created, more countries in Africa were gaining independence from European rule). The black represents the indigenous people of the continent, the red symbolises the blood of their struggle, and the green represents nature. The flag resembles the Pan-African flag designed by the Universal Negro Improvement Association, which was founded and led by Jamaican pan-Africanist leader Marcus Garvey, with the red and black bands reversed and a red sun at the top.

It also resembles the flag of the now-defunct Republic of Biafra and the national flag of Afghanistan used from 1974 to 1992.

== 2010–2012 ==
National flag from 2010–2012, nicknamed "Bingu's flag"

A new flag of Malawi was adopted on 29 July 2010, as proposed by the Democratic Progressive Party–led government. The stripes were altered from the previous flag to match the original Pan-African Flag layout, with the red stripe at the top, the black stripe in middle, and the green stripe at the bottom. The rising sun at the flag's top was replaced with a full, centred white sun with 45 rays representing the "economic progress" Malawi has made since becoming independent (it was actually one of the most unsuccessful in the world after 1990). The opposition United Democratic Front announced that it would challenge the legitimacy of flag change in court. The flag was endorsed by the President of Malawi, Bingu wa Mutharika, who approved the flag change on 29 July 2010. There was much public outcry about whether there was a need to change the flag, but the process continued despite being unwelcome to much of the public. The flag was pejoratively nicknamed "Bingu's flag" by the majority of the nation who saw it as an illegitimate flag. Many objected to the new flag, perceiving its adoption as undemocratic.

On 28 May 2012, under new president Joyce Banda, Parliament voted to revert to the independence flag.

== Flag colours ==
The colours of the flag are defined using British standard colour shades; these are the same colours as used on the Kenyan flag and later on the South Sudanese flag:

Colors scheme	Black	Red	Green
HEX	#000000	#C7361E	#008C51
RGB	0, 0, 0	199, 54, 30	0, 140, 81
CMYK	0, 0, 0, 100	0, 72, 85, 23	100, 0, 42, 45
British Standard	00-E-53 (Black)	2660-0005 (Poppy Red)	2660-0010 (Paris/Vir. Green)

== Other flags ==
Flag of the president of Malawi

Flag of the governor-general of Malawi (1964–1966)

Flag of the governor of Nyasaland (1914–1925)

Flag of the governor of Nyasaland (1925–1964)

Flag of the governor-general of the Federation of Rhodesia and Nyasaland (1953–1963)

== Historical flags ==
Flag	Date	Use	Description
	1893–1914	British Central Africa Protectorate	
	1914–1919	Nyasaland	
	1919–1925	Nyasaland	
	1925–1964	Nyasaland	
	1953–1963	Federation of Rhodesia and Nyasaland	
	1964–2010, 2012–present	Republic of Malawi	A horizontal triband of black, red and green; charged with a red rising sun with 31 rays centred on the black stripe.
	2010–2012	Republic of Malawi	A horizontal triband of red, black and green; charged with a white rising sun with 45 rays centred on the black stripe.
