= Flag of Antarctica =

Throughout history, various flag designs have been proposed to represent the uninhabited territory of Antarctica in a manner similar to national flags representing countries. Because Antarctica is governed as a condominium, there is no institution that can adopt an official flag, so all flags are used unofficially.

This should be distinguished from flags flown in Antarctica in general, which includes those used by national missions and outposts in Antarctica.

== Flag designs ==
Since the 1970s, there have been many designs proposed as a flag for Antarctica.

=== White flag (1929) ===
Original flag flown by the Discovery, stored at the Royal Museums Greenwich.

In 1929, members of the British Australian and New Zealand Antarctic Research Expedition on RRS Discovery used white cotton sheeting to improvise a courtesy ensign for Antarctica, which had (and currently has) no official flag. The banner is now in the National Maritime Museum in London. The white flag was used to represent Antarctica on at least two occasions on the voyage to Antarctica. On 1 August 1929, The Times noted that "the ship was flying the Union Jack at her forepeak, the white Antarctic flag at the foremast, and the Australian flag at the stern."

=== Whitney Smith's proposal (1978) ===
Whitney Smith proposal

Vexillologist Whitney Smith presented an orange flag with a white emblem in the hoist at the 1978 annual meeting of the North American Vexillological Association (NAVA). The letter A stands for Antarctica, the semi-sphere represents the area below the Antarctic Circle, and the hands represent human protection of the environment. For high visibility, he chose international orange, a color commonly used in the aerospace industry to set objects apart from their surroundings. The bright orange color was also chosen due to its rarity among national flags, as no nation with an active research base on the continent uses the color orange in their flag. The design elements are positioned on the hoist side of the flag so that it would remain visible even if the flag were damaged by the harsh Antarctic winds.

=== Graham Bartram's proposal (1996) ===
Graham Bartram's original proposal

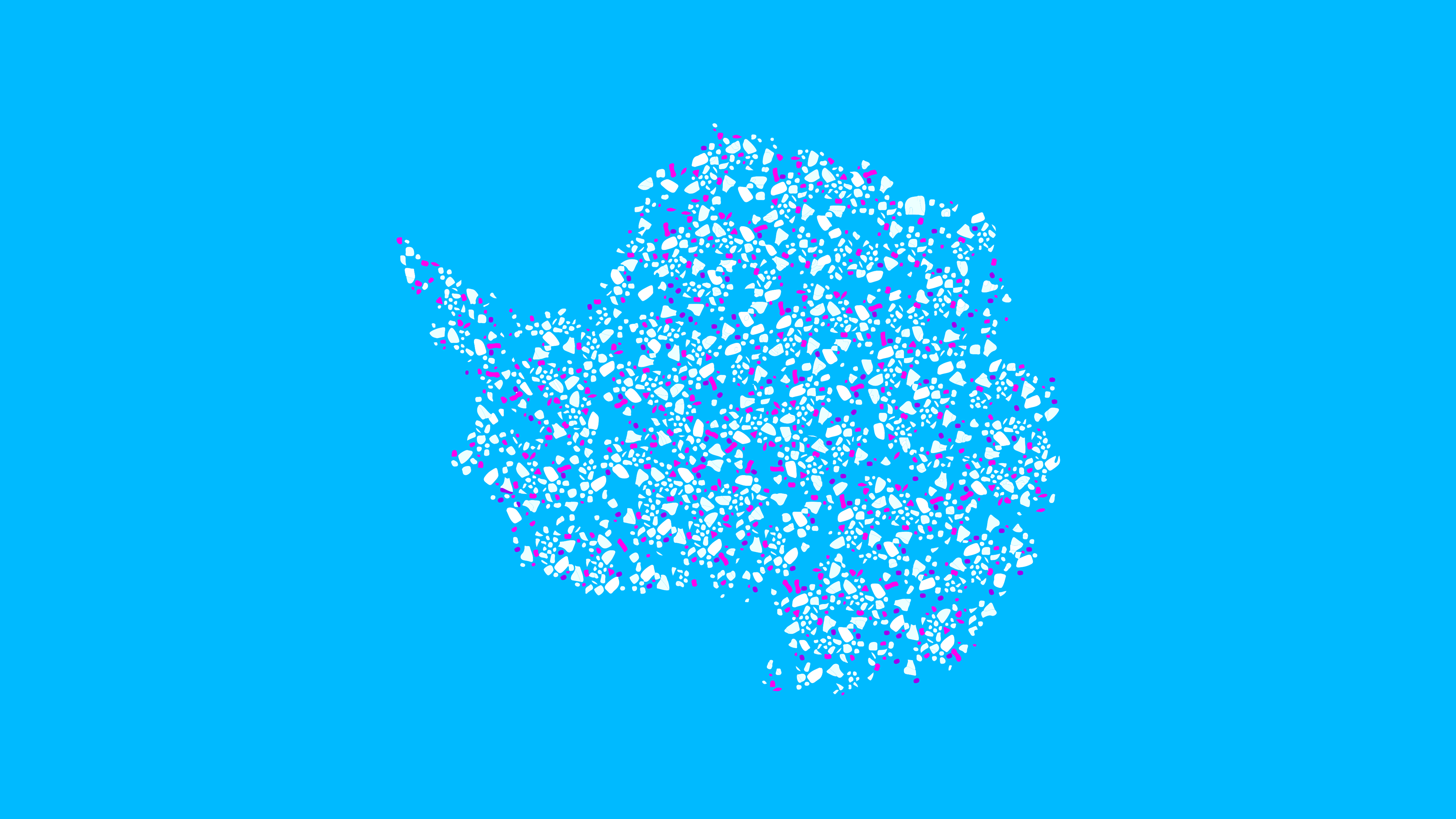
Graham Bartram's 2024 redesign

Graham Bartram, the chief vexillologist of a British organization, the Flag Institute, designed another proposal in 1996 for a 3D Atlas program developed by The MultiMedia Corporation and published by Electronic Arts. Using the flag of the United Nations as his model, he chose a plain white map of the continent on a blue background to symbolize neutrality. The flag was inspired by the emblem of the Antarctic Treaty System.

Vexillologist Ted Kaye had Bartram's design printed and took them with him on an Antarctic cruise. At Kaye's request, it flew at the Brazilian base Comandante Ferraz and the British museum at Port Lockroy. Since 2015, Bartram's design has been used on most supported platforms as the "Flag of Antarctica" emoji implemented using the regional indicator symbol sequence AQ.

In a 2024 update to his design, Bartram introduced modifications to the flag which replaced the solid white with multicolored dots, resembling pieces of plastic. The redesign was aimed at raising awareness about the presence of microplastics in Antarctica, drawing global attention to the impact on wildlife and ecosystems and advocating for international efforts to tackle this issue.

=== True South proposal (2018) ===
True South proposal

The True South proposal was designed by Evan Townsend in 2018. The flag has the following meaning:

Horizontal stripes of navy and white represent the long days and nights at Antarctica's extreme latitude. In the center, a lone white peak erupts from a field of snow and ice, echoing those of the bergs, mountains, and pressure ridges that define the Antarctic horizon. The long shadow it casts forms the unmistakable shape of a compass arrow pointed south, an homage to the continent's legacy of exploration. Together, the two center shapes create a diamond, symbolizing the hope that Antarctica will continue to be a center of peace, discovery, and cooperation for generations to come.

The flag is named after geographic South, or "true South", which differs from magnetic south.

The flag has quickly gained popularity since its introduction. It has been adopted by a few National Antarctic Programs, Antarctic nonprofits, and expedition teams; flown at several research stations across Antarctica; and was used in the 2022 marker for the geographic South Pole. The flag was also used as the flag of Antarctica by the CIA World Factbook.

== Emblem of the Antarctic Treaty ==
Emblem of the Antarctic Treaty

The emblem of the Antarctic Treaty System is occasionally used, both for its use by its members since the first consultative meeting in 1961 and for having inspired other similar flags. While the origin of this design can be traced to the first redaction of the treaty in 1959, the consultative members of the Antarctic Treaty System have officially adopted it as emblem only in 2002.

The emblem is used in the form of a flag, among other forms, along with being used on all official documents, and officially this emblem represents the Antarctic Treaty System and not the continent itself. A commemorative stamp was also issued by the US Post Office in 1971.

== See also ==
- List of Antarctic flags
  - Flag of the Antarctic Treaty
  - Flag of the British Antarctic Territory
  - Flag of the French Southern and Antarctic Lands
  - Flag of Magallanes y la Antártica Chilena Region
  - Flag of the province of Tierra del Fuego, Antarctica, and South Atlantic Islands
- List of flags by design
- List of national flags by design
- Gallery of sovereign state flags
- Gallery of flags of dependent territories
