= National LGBT Museum =

Proposed American museum

The National LGBT Museum is a proposed museum of LGBT history and culture in the United States.

The museum was proposed by Tim Gold, a former employee of the National Postal Museum and Smithsonian Institution, and his husband Mitchell Gold, a furniture manufacturer. The Golds founded the Velvet Foundation in 2007 to fund and create the new museum.

Although originally proposed as a museum in Washington, D.C., in 2015 the board of directors decided to seek a location for the museum in New York City. The initial funding goal for the museum is between $50 million and $100 million. The status of the museum is currently uncertain; the official Twitter account of the National LGBT Museum has tweeted once since 2016.
