= Antarctic Treaty issue =

Postage stamp

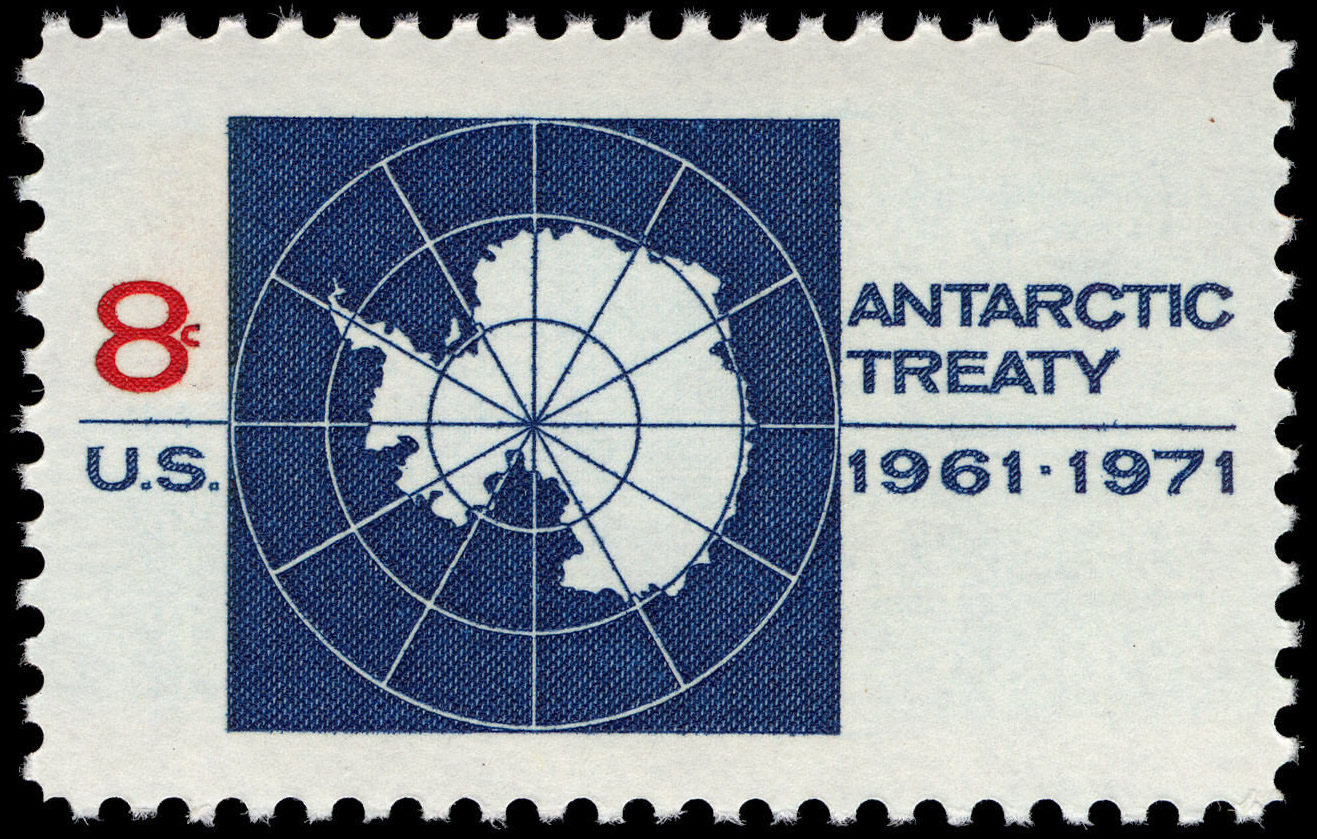
- Country of production: United States
- Designer: Howard Koslow
- Commemorates: Antarctic Treaty
- Depicts: Map of Antarctica
- Face value: US¢8

The Antarctic Treaty issue is a postage stamp that was issued by the United States Post Office Department on June 23, 1971. Designed by Howard Koslow, it commemorates the tenth anniversary of the Antarctic Treaty, and is notable as Koslow's first postage stamp design.

The stamp has a face value of eight cents. One-hundred thirty million were issued.

== Background ==
The Antarctic Treaty was signed on December 1, 1959 by the United States and eleven other nations involved in scientific research on the continent of Antarctica during the preceding biennium; seven of these nations – Argentina, Australia, Chile, France, New Zealand, Norway and the United Kingdom – had competing territorial claims to Antarctica. From November 18 to November 19, 1968, the fifth consultative meeting of the state parties to the treaty was held in Paris. During it, the issue of decennial commemorative stamps by the state parties who had signed the Antarctic Treaty was recommended.

== Release ==
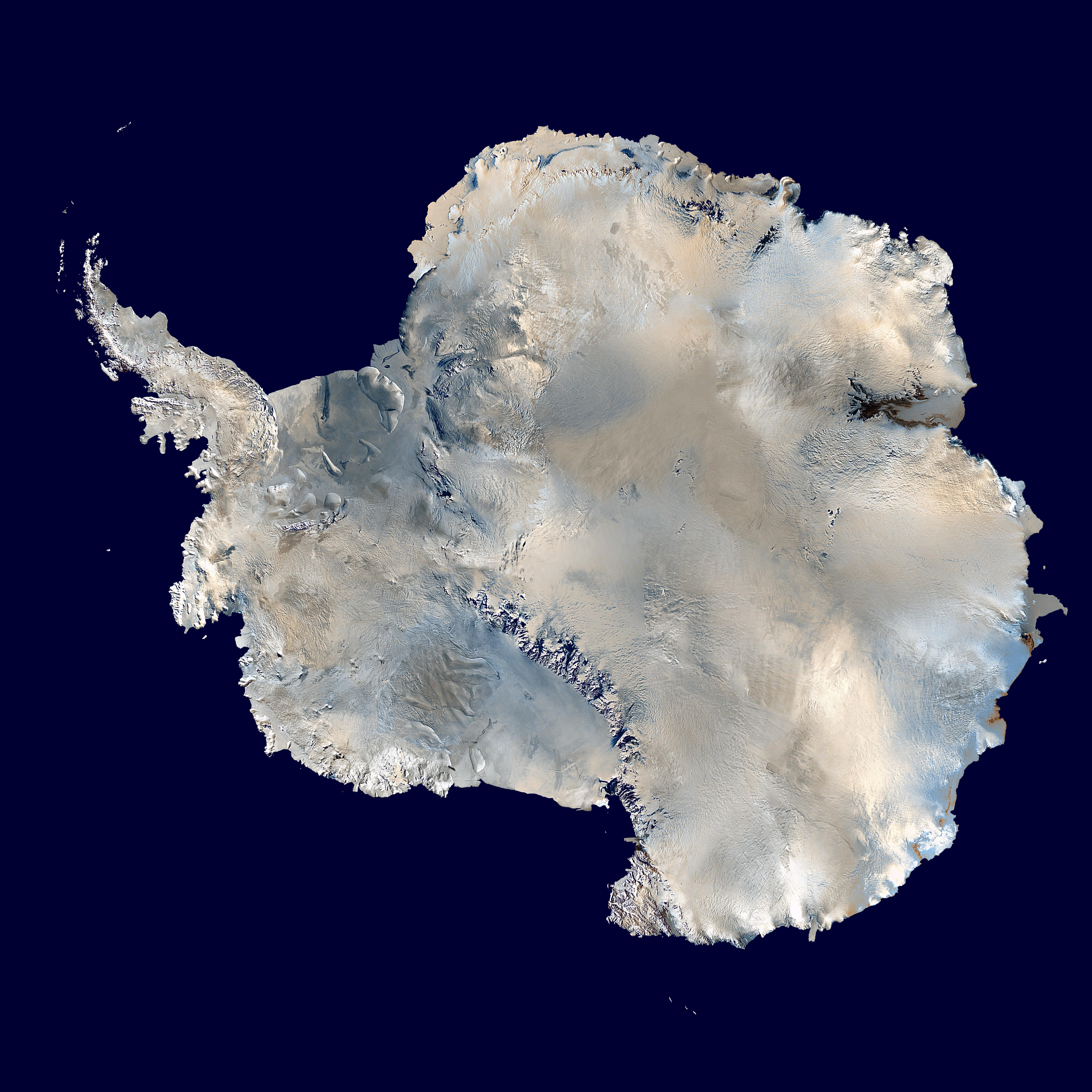
The Antarctic Treaty issue commemorates the Antarctic Treaty which provided a framework governing access to Antarctica (pictured).

The public announcement of the Antarctic Treaty issue release was made in May 1971 and it was officially released on June 23, 1971, the tenth (decennial) anniversary on which the Antarctic Treaty became effective.

The official release was accompanied by a first day ceremony in Washington, D.C. attended by United States Secretary of State William P. Rogers, United States Postmaster General Winton M. Blount, and the ambassadors to the United States of the state parties to the Antarctic Treaty. During the ceremony, Blount presented an album of the stamps to Soviet ambassador Anatoly Dobrynin.

One-hundred thirty million Antarctic Treaty issue stamps were printed.

=== Proofs ===
Specimens of the stamp, as well as its plate proofs, are held by the National Philatelic Collection, housed in the National Postal Museum. In 2013, the United States Postal Service (USPS) auctioned on eBay a proof of the Antarctic Treaty issue that contained the handwritten approval of Postmaster General Blount. The proof was one of two such proofs of the Antarctic Treaty issue held in the Postmaster General's Philatelic Collection. It sold for $1,099.99.

== Design ==
The stamp was designed by the acclaimed American postage stamp illustrator Howard Koslow, and was notable as his first postage stamp design. It features a map of Antarctica in white, set on a field of blue, which was adapted from the logo design used on documents of the treaty's consultative meetings. Earlier, in 1965, the Special Committee on Antarctic Research of the International Council of Scientific Unions had called for stamps commemorating the decennial of the treaty to prominently feature the map of Antarctica. Due to competing territorial claims in Antarctica, the simplicity of a map-centered design was considered a matter of political importance.

The stamp has an eight cents face value.

== Related stamps ==
In addition to the United States, other state parties to the Antarctic Treaty also issued commemorative stamps on its ten-year anniversary.

In 1991, on the thirtieth anniversary of the Antarctic Treaty, the United States issued another stamp commemorating the Antarctic Treaty. Howard Koslow returned to design the fifty-cent, airmail, stamp which depicted USCGC Glacier near Ross Island.

== Emblem of the Antarctic Treaty ==
Emblem of the Antarctic Treaty

After the design found on the stamp was employed as an emblem of the Antarctic Treaty System informally since the first consultative meeting in 1961, with similar designs found even in the first redaction of the treaty from 1959, the members of the Antarctic Treaty System have adopted it officially in 2002. The emblem is used in the form of a flag, among other forms, and it has inspired subsequent designs. Officially this emblem represents the Antarctic Treaty System and not the continent itself.

== See also ==
- List of the Antarctic flags
- Postage stamps and postal history of the United States
