= Postal Square Building =

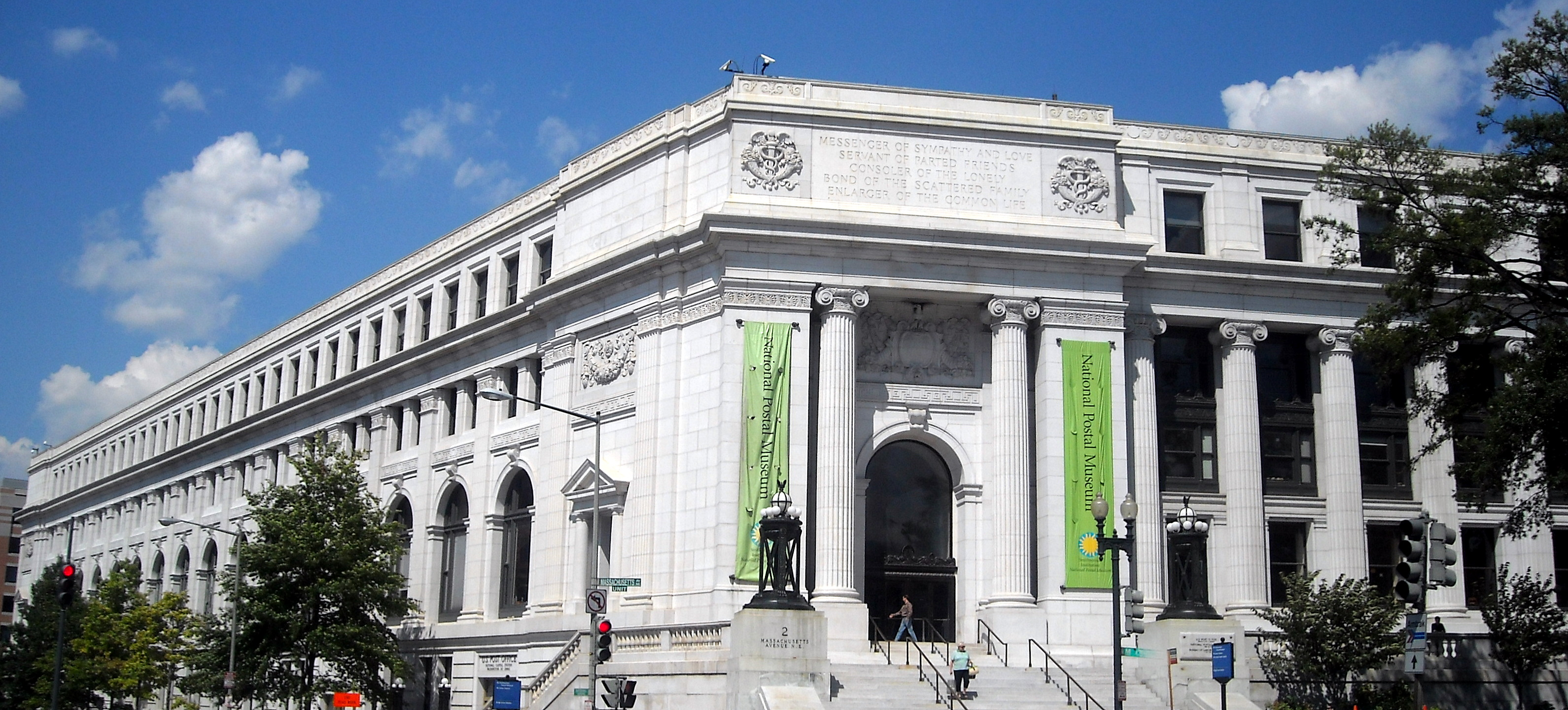
- Postal Square Building in 2008
- Former names: City Post Office

General information
- Architectural style: Beaux-Arts
- Location: 2 Massachusetts Avenue, NE; Washington, D.C., U.S.
- Coordinates: 38°53′52.8″N 77°0′29.9″W
- Current tenants: Bureau of Labor Statistics, National Postal Museum
- Construction started: 1911
- Completed: 1914
- Renovated: 1929–1935

Design and construction
- Architect: Daniel Burnham

The Postal Square Building, formerly the City Post Office, served as the main post office for the city of Washington, D.C., from the building's completion in 1914 to 1986. It now houses the National Postal Museum and offices of the United States Senate. Architect Daniel Burnham designed the building in the Beaux-Arts style—the same style Burnham used for neighboring Washington Union Station.

Construction for the Postal Square Building began in 1911 on a lot near the Capitol. Planning began with a 1901 proposal by the Senate Parks Commission. The commission called for three buildings to mark the northern end of the Capitol complex. While the first two buildings in the plan, Union Station and the Postal Square Building, were completed early in the 20th century, the 1901 plan would not be fully implemented until the completion of the Thurgood Marshall Federal Judiciary Building in 1992.

A major renovation from 1929 to 1935 expanded the building for increased mail processing and service capacity. By the 1950s, renovations had removed many of the Beaux-Arts features of the building. The main hall and lobby area only showed traces of their former grandiose design with modernist elements replacing the Beaux-Arts style.

The building received another major renovation in the early 1990s, during which the original appearance of the lobby and main hall area was restored. The National Postal Museum moved into the building in 1993 following the renovations. The Bureau of Labor Statistics and the Capitol City Brewing Company also moved into the building during the 1990s. Capitol City Brewing Company closed in 2011 to make room for an expansion of the National Postal Museum. The Bureau of Labor Statistics moved its headquarters to the Suitland Federal Center in Suitland, Maryland, in 2024.

== Gallery ==
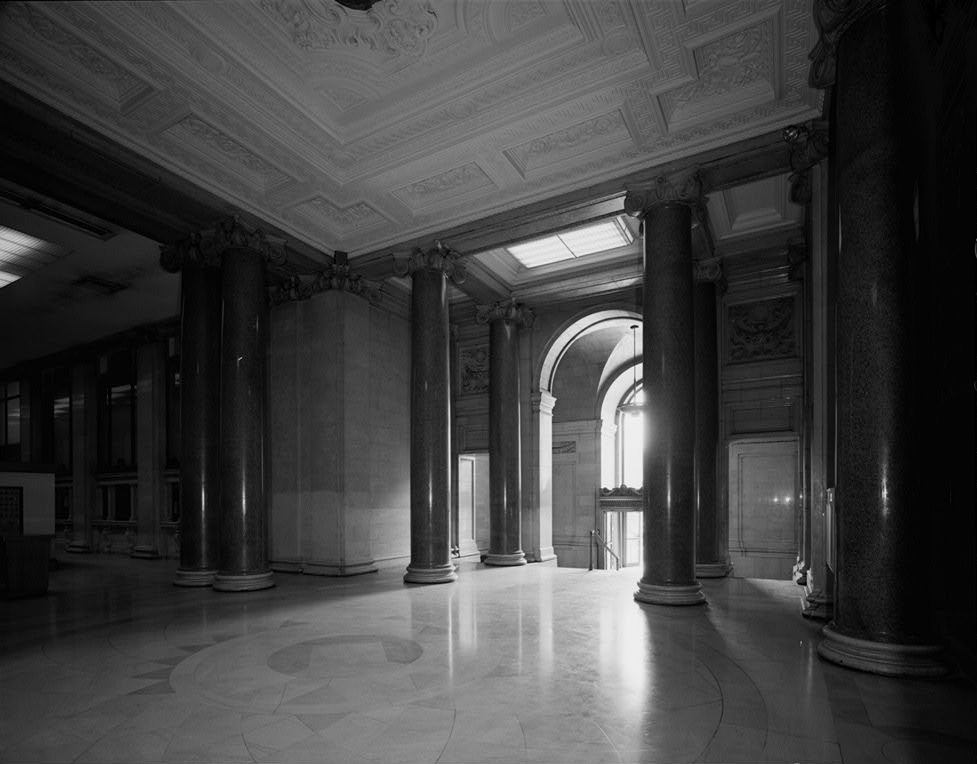
Southwest entrance lobby in 1989 showing some elements of the original design such as the columns and modified coffering

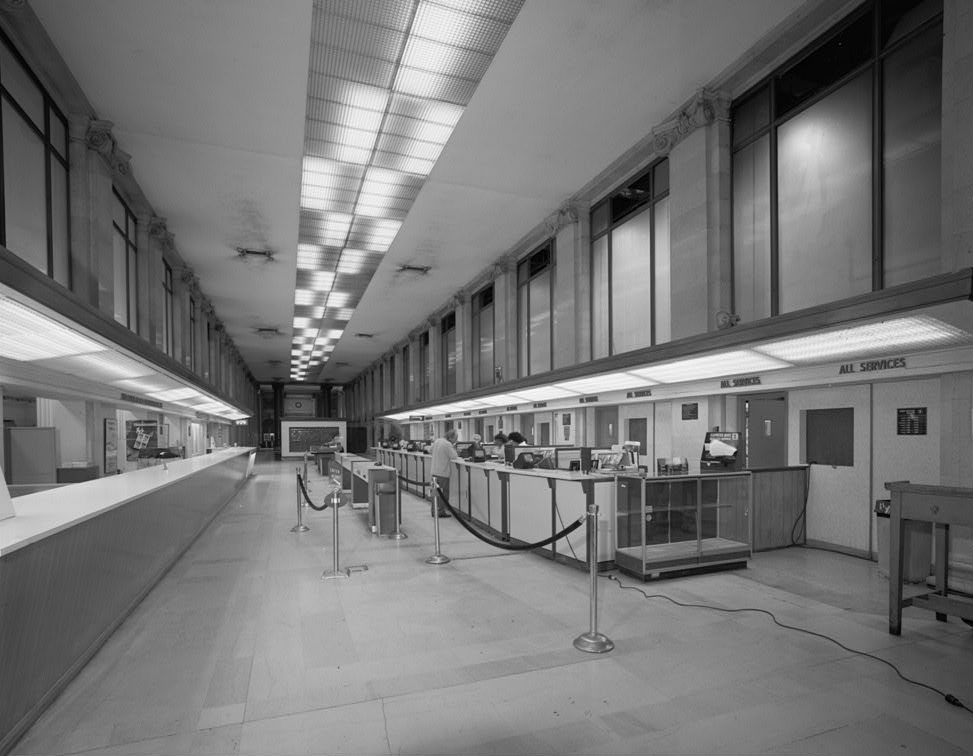
The main hall and lobby area before the restoration; The ceiling has been lowered, and the hall narrowed.

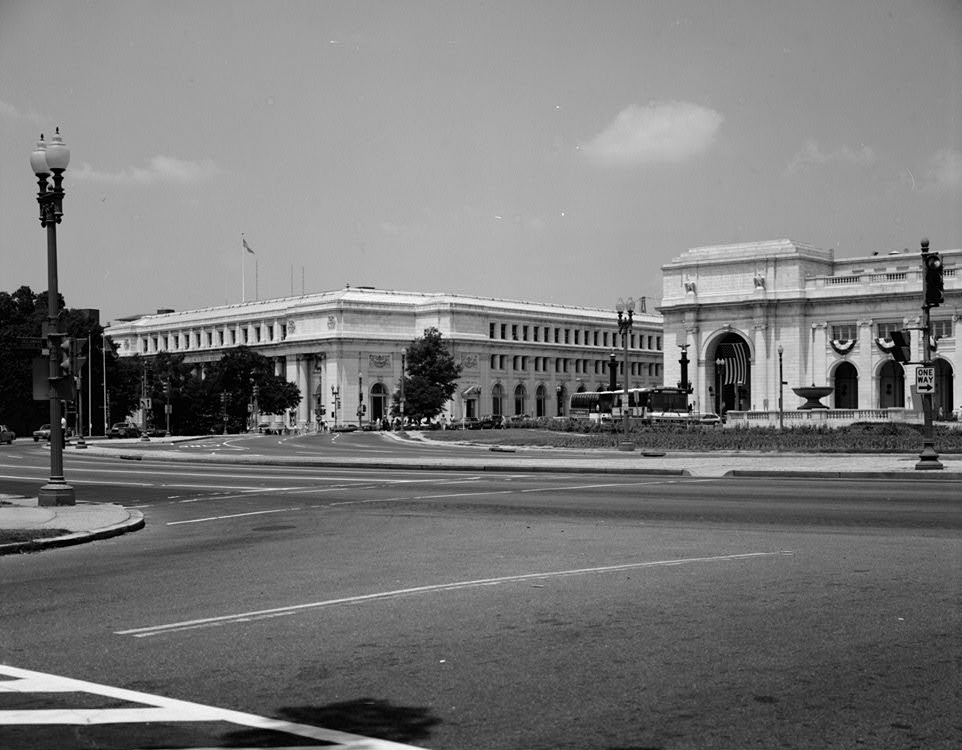
Postal Square Building (left) from Columbus Circle with Union Station to the right

== See also ==
- List of United States post offices
