= Howard Koslow =

American illustrator (1924–2016)

Howard Koslow (September 21, 1924 – January 25, 2016) was an American illustrator.

Koslow was awarded an Art League scholarship to Pratt Institute in New York City. He graduated in 1944 and went on to apprentice with French poster artist Jean Carlu at the latter's New York City studio. Koslow went on to study painting at the Cranbrook Academy of Art in Bloomfield Hills, Michigan, and graphics at the School of Visual Arts.

Some of Koslow's works are at the United States Air Force Academy and The Pentagon. Several of his paintings which were commissioned by NASA are on exhibition at the National Air and Space Museum, Washington, D.C., and the NASA Art Gallery, Kennedy Space Center. He is responsible for the design of the Antarctic Treaty issue.

== Sources ==
- Howard Koslow profile provided by Wind River Studios
