= Plastic pollution in Antarctica =

Plastic pollution in Antarctica is referring to all forms of plastic debris that are found in the Antarctic continent, islands, and the Southern Ocean. Despite being the most remote continent and having no native human population, Antarctica is not immune from the introduction of plastic pollution to its ecosystem. The first recorded presence of plastics in Antarctica in the scientific literature dates back to 1982, with the reporting of Fur Seals in South Georgia Island being found with ropes made of synthetic fibers tied around their necks.

== Extent ==
Plastic items account for most litter found in Antarctica. Surface waters in the Southern Ocean have been found to have a concentration of plastics that is similar to that found in oceans at lower latitudes. Lacerda et al. found in their 2019 study that surface waters in the Antarctic peninsula had an average of 1,794 plastic items per square kilometer. Aside from seawater, the presence of plastics has also been recorded in the Antarctic snow, glacier ice, sea ice, intertidal sediments, and deep sea sediments, as well as in marine and terrestrial organisms in the lowest trophic level all the way to apex predators. Studies have found an increasing presence of plastic debris in the region throughout the years, suggesting that the issue is worsening as time goes on and that the extent of plastic pollution to this day remains mostly underestimated. Fragmentation of plastics into microplastics (1mm to 5mm in size) and nanoplastics (<1 mm in size) is common. The smaller the fragment the more it becomes mobile and easily assimilated by organisms. Microplastics and nanoplastics may also be transported to the Southern Ocean from lower latitudes.

== Sources ==
Some studies estimate that about half of plastic pollution in the continent originates from anthropogenic activities within Antarctica and the other half are sourced ex-situ, while others suggest that the Southern Ocean is a net importer of plastic pollution due to transport from global sources by ocean currents and winds. Many studies agree with the latter, with measurements of microplastic concentrations being orders of magnitude higher than would be expected from local sources of plastic such as tourism, fishing and research. This highlights how plastic concentrations and fluxes into Antarctica are poorly understood. Due to its remoteness, difficult environmental conditions, and sometimes lack of robust analytical methods, research on the extent of plastic pollution in Antarctica is sparse, making it underestimated and misunderstood. Additionally, most studies have been conducted in the Antarctic peninsula, where there is the highest concentration of research stations and potentially the highest point of introduction of local plastic pollution sources.

=== Local sources ===
==== Tourism ====
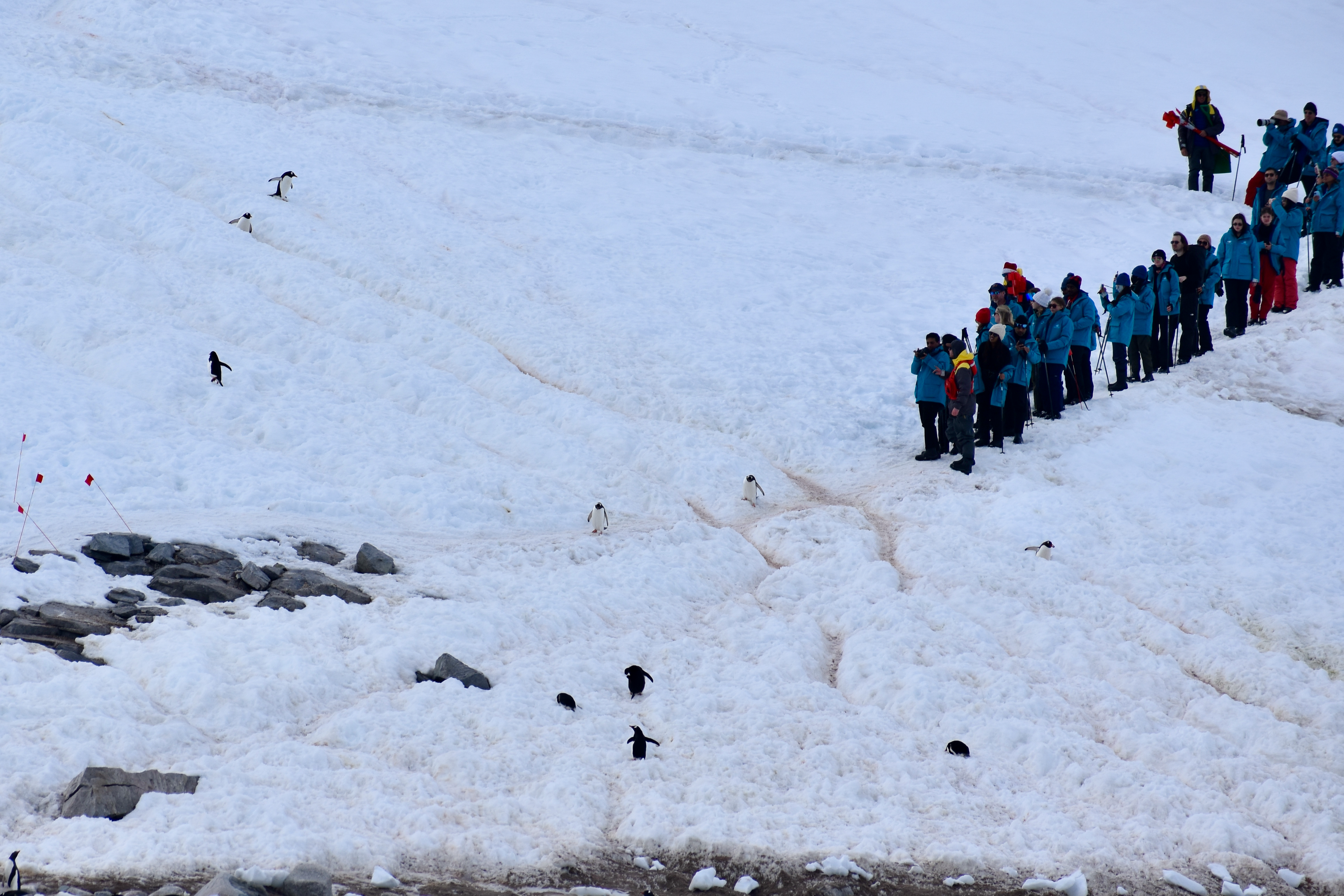
Tourists observing penguins in Antarctica

Antarctica has diverse sources of plastic pollution. One of the main in-situ sources of plastic pollution in Antarctica is touristic activities, which have expanded in Antarctica since the 1960s, with the International Association of Antarctica Tour Operators (IAATO) recording 36,769 cruise-only visitors, 80,434 landed visits, and 938 deep field visitors during the 2024-2025 tourist season. There is concern about wastewater being released from cruise ships and its potential discharge of microbeads and microplastics directly into the ocean, the release of microplastics from pharmaceuticals and personal care products (PPCPs) and synthetic textiles, as well as the mismanagement of waste from tourists.

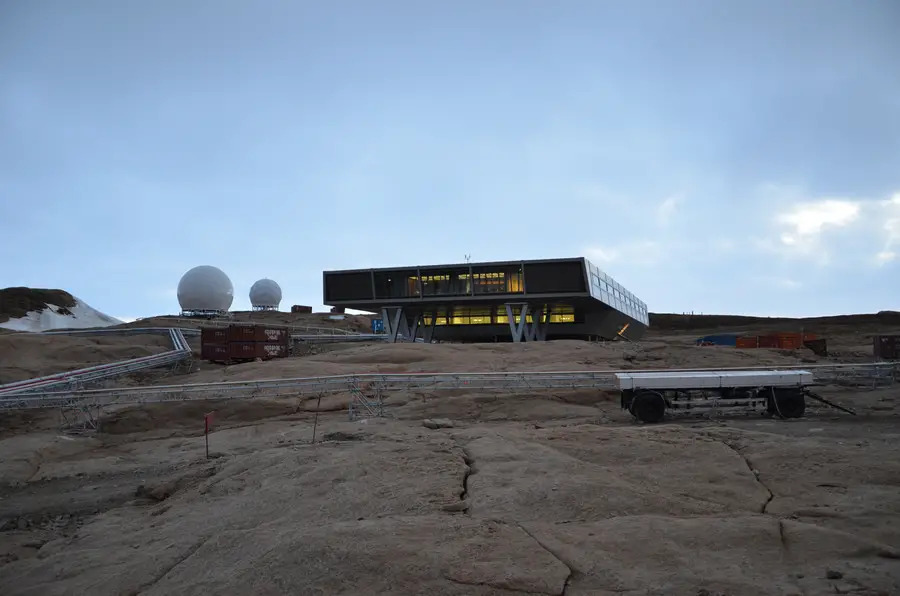
Bharati permanent Antarctic research station, commissioned by India

==== Scientific research ====
Plastics can also originate from the several research stations that are present across the continent. Scientific research activities generate a lot of plastic waste, namely insulation panels, surface sealants and coatings, electrical potting compounds, plastic bags and bottle caps. These contain polyurethane and polystyrene, which are among the plastic compounds most frequently found in the Antarctic peninsula. The presence of microplastics and microbeads in wastewater is an ongoing issue for research stations in Antarctica. A study performed in 2009 found that among the then 71 stations found in Antarctica, more than half did not have any wastewater treatment system whatsoever, facilitating the introduction of microplastics into the local environment. Data on the volume of wastewater being released into the Southern Ocean is unavailable, making it difficult to quantify the extent of the problem.

==== Fishing ====
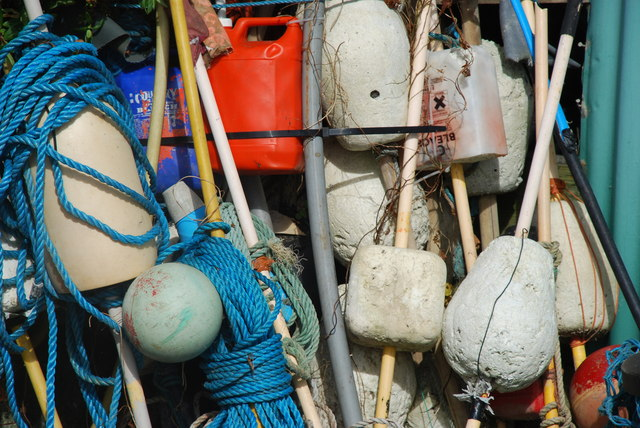
Fishing gear

Fishing began in the Southern Ocean in the 1960s. The fishing industry is estimated to contribute to between 33% and 50% of litter at South Georgia and South Orkney Islands. During a marine debris monitoring activity in the Barton Peninsula of King George Island, ropes, polystyrene, and cargo debris – all materials commonly used during fishing activities accounted for 9.30%, 10.71% and 7.14% of total marine debris surveyed, respectively. Another survey found that fishing gear (nets, floats, ropes, etc.) represented 22% of discarded plastic items in Macquarie and Heard islands. Wastewater can also be released from fishing vessels, contributing to microplastic pollution in the same way as tourism and research activities.

=== Global sources ===
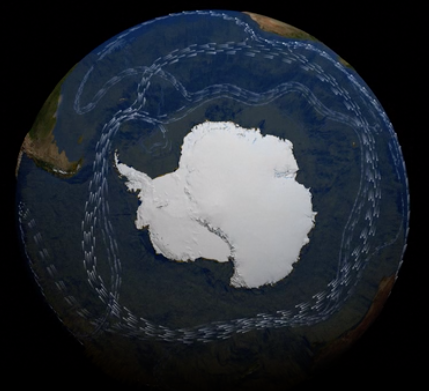
Antarctic Circumpolar Current

Many plastics that enter the oceans float because they are less dense than seawater. As a result, mismanaged plastic waste from lower latitudes can make its way to Antarctica via atmospheric transport and make Antarctica into a sink for plastic pollution. Other plastics sink in the ocean column because they are denser than seawater, and can find themselves in Antarctica through oceanic circulation systems. While it was previously believed that Antarctic waters were isolated by the Antarcitc Circumpolar Current (ACC), it was actually found that the upwelling of the ACC can bring plastic debris from lower latitudes and from the deep ocean to Antarctica. Other currents such as the westerly coastal current, the Weddell Sea circulation and the Ross Sea circulation are all stipulated to potentially be a source of influx of plastic into Antarctica's high latitudes.

== Types of plastic ==
The most common types of plastic debris found in Antarctica polyurethane, polyamide, polyethylene, polypropylene, polyethylene-terephthalate, acrylic and polystyrene. These are polymers frequently used in the production of common objects, clothing, and fishing gear. Resin-based particles such as paint fragments are common yet often overlooked emerging contaminants with similar effects as microplastics. They were found to be 30 times more abundant than other plastics in one survey. The composition of plastics found in organisms is similar to that found in organisms at lower latitudes.

== Impacts ==
Antarctic species are particularly vulnerable to changes in their environment such as the introduction of plastics because many of them evolved slow physiological processes allowing for better nutrient absorption and energy storage in the face of extreme weather conditions and limited food sources. As a result, they may retain plastic particles inside their tissues and organs for longer.

Plastics are also known to be potential vectors of toxic chemicals, pathogens, and even invasive species, which could disturb Antarctica's ecosystem in various ways.

=== Antarctic Fauna ===
The concentration of microplastics in Antarctic animals varies significantly by species. White-blooded species are more adapted to cold environments and thus have a lower metabolic rate and tend to hold on to microplastics for longer periods. Once microplastics are ingested, they can impact organismal health in several ways by causing namely endocrine disruption, and behavioural changes. A study by Cole et al. (2015) identified that when adding microplastics to the diet of Calanus helgolandicus, a filter feeding crustacean, individuals displayed changes in feeding behaviour sand lower reproductive success.

Species have different feeding behaviours and interact with their habitat in unique ways, influencing how they will respond to the presence of plastics in their environment. For example, piscivorous fish have a predatory behaviour which could lead to them mistake plastic fragments with their natural prey. Green and white plastic fragments could also be mistaken for algae by fish that consume algae as part of their diet. Birds and mammals can also ingest larger plastic fragments, mistaking it for food. Many seabirds are surface seizers, making them susceptible to this behaviour. Plastic ingestion can cause internal abrasion, block the digestive system, and starvation by reducing the feeding stimulus. Regurgitated plastics can also be fed to chicks. In a study conducted in 2003/2004, there were reports of 630 fishing hooks being regurgitated by the wandering albatross, a species considered threatened by the IUCN.

Plastics can enter the food chain through benthic organisms consuming plastics in the deep-sea sediments. Plastic fragments persist for longer in the benthic zone due to the lack of solar radiation to assist in the degradation process. The deposition of plastic fragments at the bottom of the water column can impact sediment composition, and alter the critical ecosystem services that they provide. However, little is known about how plastics can impact benthic organisms.

Species that are at higher trophic levels can be exposed to much greater concentrations of microplastics through bioaccumulation and biomagnification. For example, high microplastic concentrations were reported in the gastrointestinal tract of Gentoo penguins. This is likely because they feed primarily on Antarctic krill, a species that has been reported to ingest large amounts of microplastics due to its filter feeding behaviour.

Entanglement and smothering with larger plastic fragments is common in birds and mammals. There were over one thousand reports of fur seals being entangled with collars made with plastic debris (rubber rings, fishing knots, etc.) between 1989 and 2008 at Bird Island, most of them being juvenile males. Cosequences of entanglement include injuries, open wounds, infections, severing, strangluation, and drowining, which can all lead to death of the individual. Entanglement can also restrict mobility, which may prevent animals from escaping predators or catching prey.

=== Antarctic flora and funga ===
Little research is dedicated to evaluating the impacts of plastics on plants and fungi that are native to Antarctica. Some Antarctic fungi and plants have been observed to grow and form colonies within plastic debris but its consequences for their growth and development has not been investigated. Halogenated flame retardants were measured in mosses and lichens from the South Shetland Islands even in very remote locations, indicating that these species are exposed to plastic-related contaminants.

== Combination with other environmental stressors ==
Most species in Antarctica are endemic and have evolved unique traits to adapt to the region's extreme conditions. Antarctic species benefitted until recently from a very stable environment relatively free from anthropogenic disturbance. As a result, they are particularly susceptible to suffering from any changes in environmental conditions. Plastic pollution can impart a lot of stress to species already affected by decreases in sea ice formations, climate change, ocean acidification, invasive species introduction and other anthropogenic disturbances. For example, a laboratory experiment found that the embryonic development of Antarctic krill was unimpacted by exposure to either nanoplastics or ocean acidification, but that it was severely impacted when both conditions were reunited. Climate change and resulting melting sea ice can expose plastic that was otherwise trapped in the ice, which can lead to zooplankton mistaking small plastic fragments for sea-ice algae.

== State of the science ==
Macroplastic pollution in Antarctica has been recorded in the scientific literature through sea and land surveys. Scientists have recently been investigating microplastic pollution in Antarctica but data is very scarce. There is no standardized method to measure microplastics in organisms which leads to differing results even across studies sampling individuals in the same region. However, microplastic research is a rapidly growing field of research with increasingly more studies being conducted in more parts of the continent and surrounding islands, exploring new research methods in different mediums.

While there are a growing number of studies exploring the effects of microplastic ingestion on humans, there are comparatively less studies on how they affect other organisms, particularly in Antarctica.

== Regulatory context ==
Human activities in Antarctica are restricted by the 1959 Antarctic Treaty which notably prohibited military activities in the Treaty Area but did not include specific environmental provisions until it was supplemented by the Madrid Protocol in 1991, also known as the Protocol on Environmental Protection to the Antarctic Treaty. The Madrid Protocol includes proivisions such as the obligation to conduct an environmental impact assessment for activities conducted within the Treaty Area and forbids ships from discharging sewage in the vicinity of the continent. Increasing attention has been given to the issue of plastic pollution in the region since 2017 and led to the adoption of Resolution 5 in 2019 named "Reducing Plastic Pollution in Antarctica and the Southern Ocean". This resolution encourages governments to forbid the import of personal care products containing microplastics to Antarctica and to improve monitoring and research on plastic pollution in the area. However, the Treaty Area is limited in its geographical coverage, and can thus not address plastic sources originating from outside the region.

== Outlook ==
Without immediate and concerted action, plastic pollution in Antarctica is expected to get worse since global plastic production is expected to triple by 2060, with most of this rise comprising single use plastic items.

Establishing protocols for the measurement of plastic concentration in different mediums is critical for ensuring robust data is being collected to be able to fully assess the extent of plastic pollution in Antarctica. Tackling plastic pollution in Antarctica demands the creation of policies regulating plastic waste and the collaboration from governments, companies and non-governmental organizations to ensure the Antarctic ecosystem is not further fragilized by this stressor.
