= List of Antarctic flags =

Flag of the international Antarctic Treaty System since 1961 and ratified in 2002

This list includes flags that either have been in use or are currently used in Antarctica. As a condominium with no single governing body, the continent of Antarctica does not have an official flag of its own. However, several designs have been created for the purpose of representing the continent.

== Antarctic flag proposals ==
Flag	Date	Use	Description
	1929	RRS Discovery crew	Plain white flag
	1978	Whitney Smith's proposal.	An orange field bearing an emblem consisting of a pair of hands holding a segment of a disk representing Earth with the letter "A" representing Antarctica.
	1995	Joanne Cooper and Stefan Tucker's proposal.	An orange field bearing an outline of Antarctica, a compass pointing south at the bottom hoist, and the outline of a penguin in the fly.
	1996	Graham Bartram's proposal.	A white outline of Antarctica on a UN-blue background.
	1999	Dave Hamilton's proposal.	The pale blue strip represents pack ice, the dark blue stripe represents the night sky and the yellow stripe is a representation of the aurora australis. The famous stellar constellation the Southern Cross is shown in the dark blue stripe in the fly corner.
	2007/2008	Olivier Leroi's proposal.	The flag is vertically divided in four stripes — black, off-white, orange, and gray — reproducing the proportions of the colors on the "livery" (feathers) of an emperor penguin, selected as Antarctica's emblematic animal.
	2018	Evan Townsend's proposal (True South flag)	According to the flag's promoters, it signifies: "Horizontal stripes of navy and white represent the long days and nights at Antarctica's extreme latitude. In the center, a lone white peak erupts from a field of snow and ice, echoing those of the bergs, mountains, and pressure ridges that define the Antarctic horizon. The long shadow it casts forms the unmistakable shape of a compass arrow pointed south, an homage to the continent's legacy of exploration. Together, the two center shapes create a diamond, symbolizing the hope that Antarctica will continue to be a center of peace, discovery, and cooperation for generations to come."
	2024	Graham Bartram's 2024 redesign.	An Antarctic shape made of colorful microplastic-like spots on a blue background.

== Flags of international Antarctic organizations ==
Flag	Date	Use	Description
	1961, formalized in 2002	Flag of the Antarctic Treaty System	Logo of the organization in 2:3 proportions. A white outline of Antarctica over a dark blue field with lines representing longitude and latitude counterchanged on top.
	2013–present	Flag of the Scientific Committee on Antarctic Research	Logo of the organization in 2:3 proportions. A white outline of Antarctica on a blue field defaced with the acronym of the organization, surrounded by the text "The International Council for Science" and "Scientific Committee for Antarctic Research" arranged in a circle within a white circular line.

== Flags of Antarctic territorial claims ==
Flag	Date	Use	Description
Claims using a special flag
	1963–present	British Antarctic Territory	A UK White Ensign less the cross of St. George defaced with the coat of arms of the British Antarctic Territory.
	1963–present	British Antarctic Territory	A UK Blue Ensign defaced with the coat of arms of the British Antarctic Territory.
Claims using the flag of a larger administrative unit
	1999–present	Argentine Antarctica, in Tierra del Fuego Province.	The blue symbolizes the sky and sea surrounding the province, while the Southern Cross reflects the night sky and the albatross itself is a local bird that represents freedom through flight.
	1997–present	Chilean Antarctic Territory, in Magallanes Region.	The blue color represents the night sky, while the golden peaks symbolize the steppe region, white indicates the snow that often falls in winter, and the Southern Cross symbolizes the position of the area.
	2007–present	Adélie Land, in French Southern and Antarctic Territories.	The flag consists of a blue field with the French flag with white fimbriation on the canton. The charge consists of five stars (for the five regions of the French Southern and Antarctic Territories) and the letters "TAAF" (from the French name of the territory, Terres australes et antarctiques françaises) forming a monogram in the shape of anchor.
Proposals
	1995	Ross Dependency	The New Zealand flag is the basis for his design, though with an 'Ice Blue' background representing the Ross Sea, and the white horizontal bar at the bottom of the flag representing the Ross Ice Shelf.

== Antarctic expedition flags ==
Flag	Date	Use	Description
	1902–1904	Scottish National Antarctic Expedition	Scottish saltire with the letters "S-N-A-E" as an acronym for "Scottish National Antarctic Expedition".
	1910–1912	Imperial Japanese Antarctic Expedition	
	1933–1939	Byrd's Second Antarctic Expedition	
	1946–1948	Ronne Antarctic Research Expedition	
	1947–present	French Antarctic Expedition, also used in the Arctic.	
	1979–1982	"Transglobe" Expedition	UK flag defaced with a globe and an arrow circumnavigate it from North to South.

=== Sledge flags ===
To make it easier to recognize the participants of the expedition, flags were placed on the sleighs. British expeditions used distinctly complex, embroidered designs for this purpose.

==== Southern Cross Expedition (1898–1900) ====
William Colbeck

==== Discovery Expedition (1901–1904) ====
Robert Falcon Scott ("Ready Aye Ready")

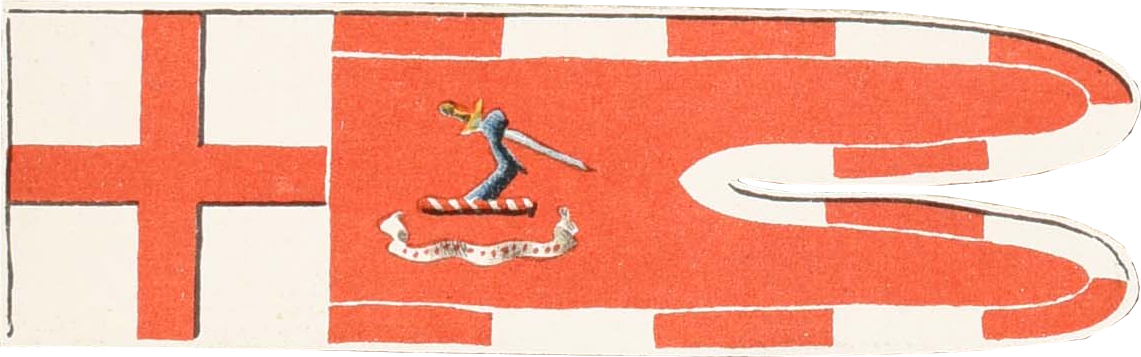
Albert Borlase Armitage ("Semper Paratus")

Michael Barne ("Nec temere, nec timide")

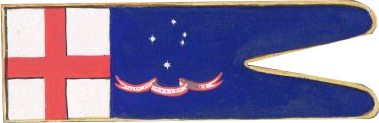
Louis Charles Bernacchi ("Rapua, Rapua Ka Kitea")

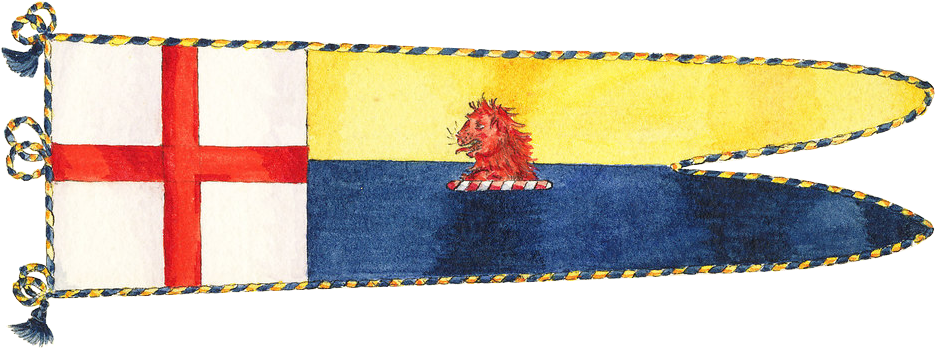
William Colbeck

Tom Crean

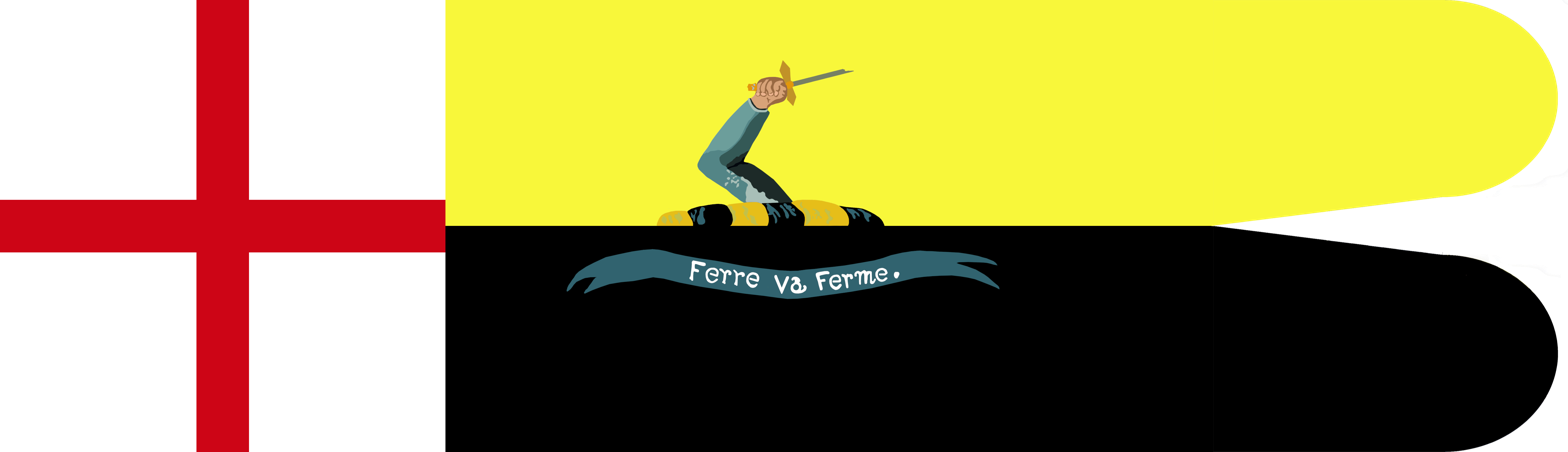
Hartley Travers Ferrar ("Ferre Va Ferme")

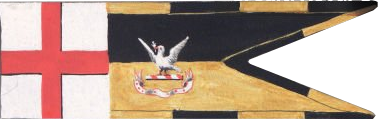
Thomas Vere Hodgson ("Dread God")

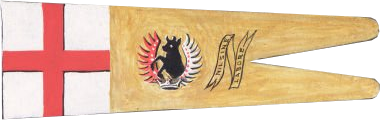
Reginald Koettlitz ("Nil Sine Labore")

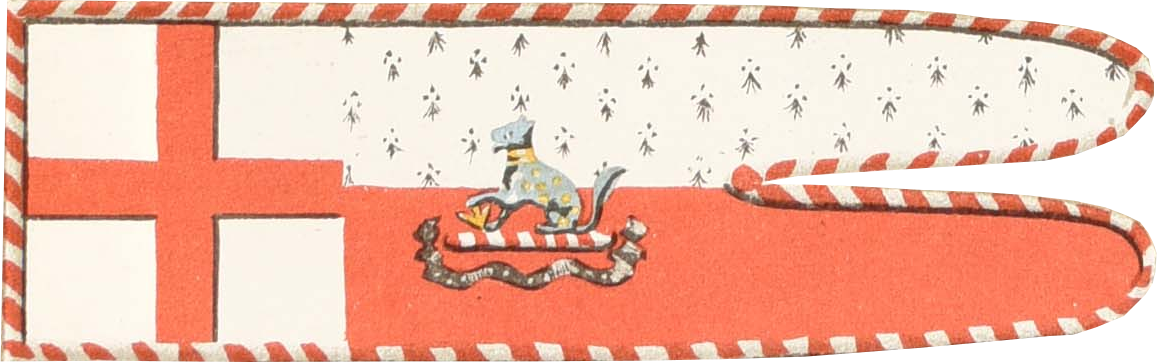
Charles Royds ("Semper Paratus")

Ernest Henry Shackleton ("Fortitudine Vincimus")

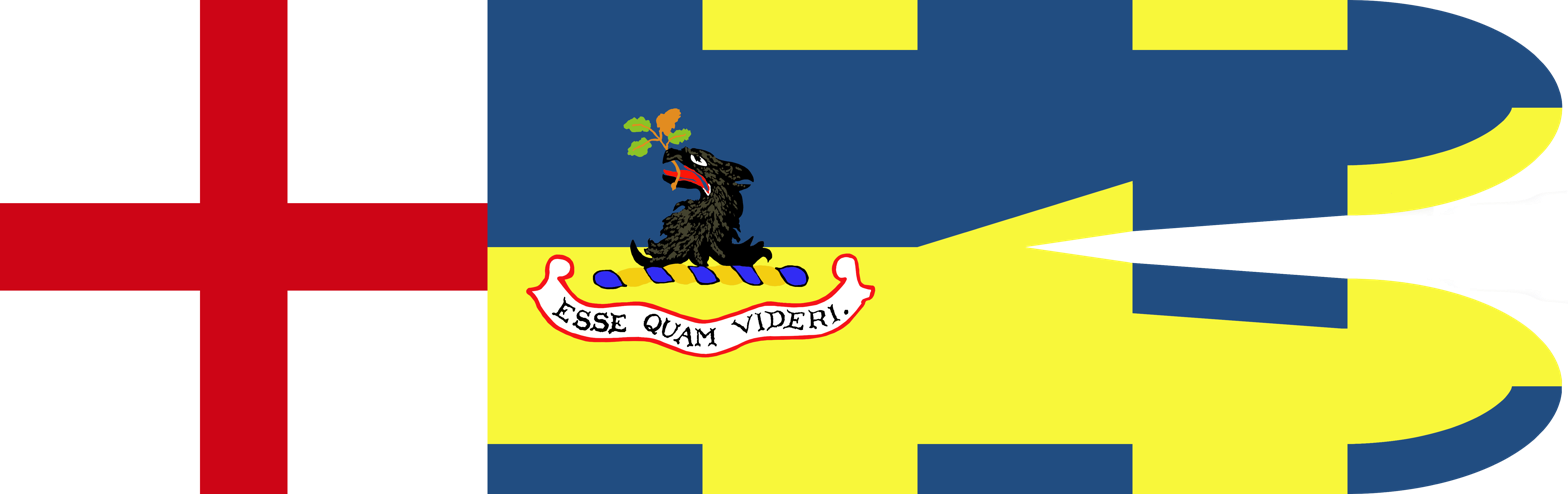
Reginald William Skelton ("Esse Quam Videri")

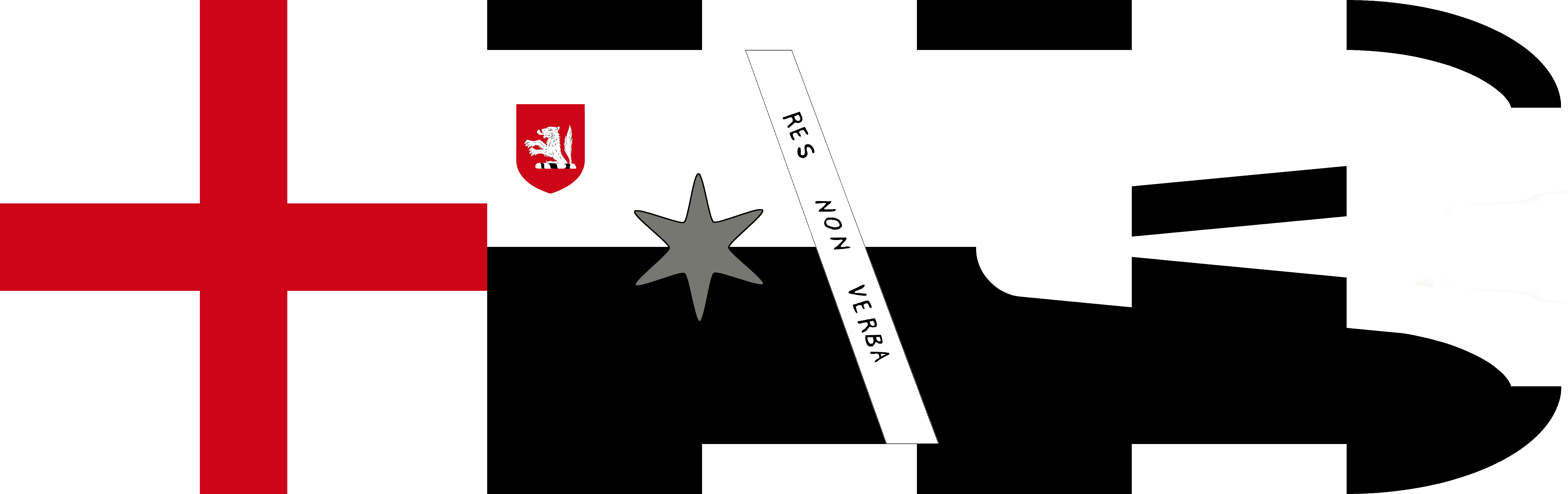
Edward Adrian Wilson ("Res Non Verba")

==== Nimrod Expedition (1907–1909) ====
Ernest Henry Shackleton ("Fortitudine Vincimus")

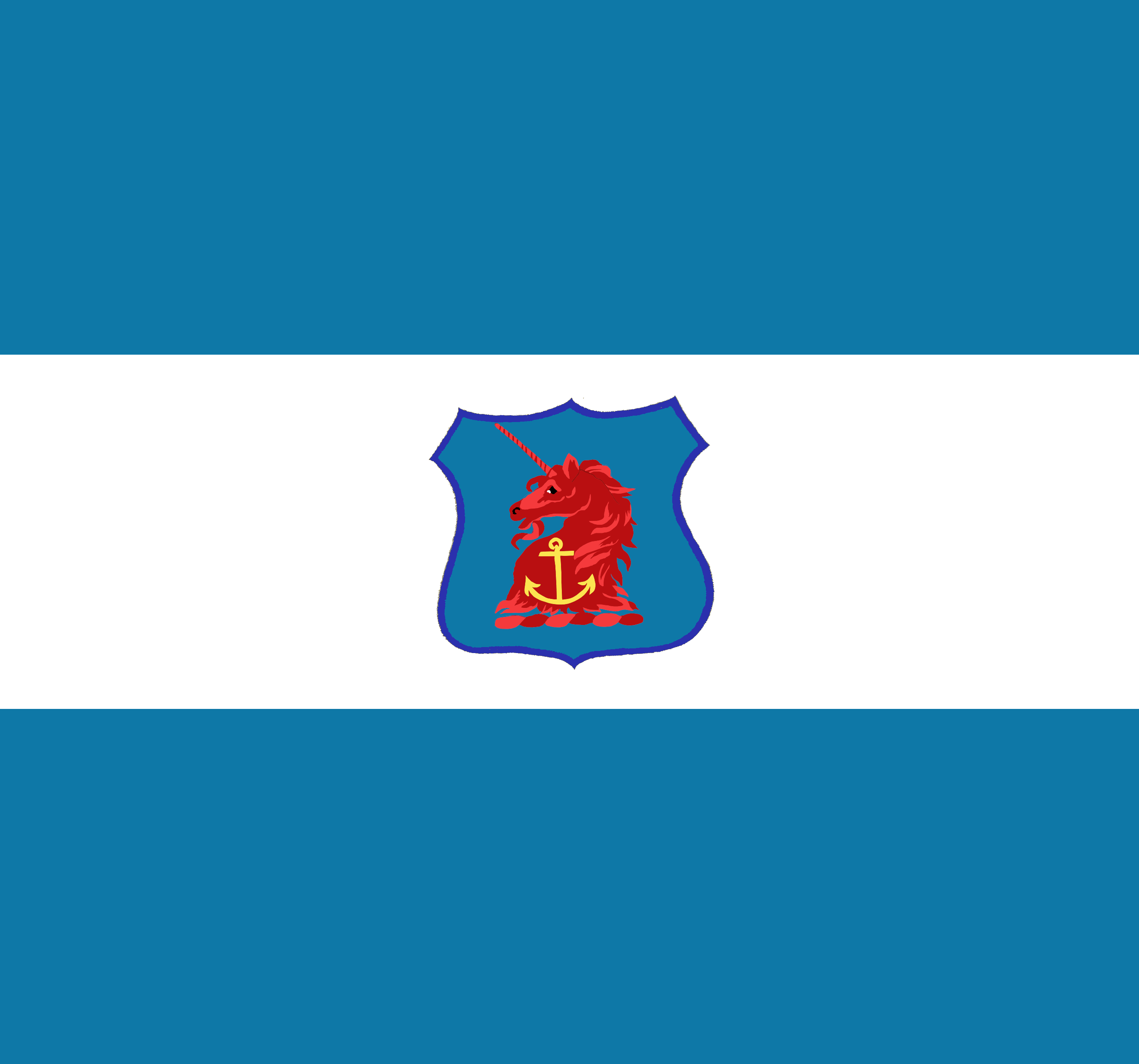
Eric Marshall

==== Terra Nova Expedition (1910–1913) ====
Robert Falcon Scott
("Ready Aye Ready")

Robert Falcon Scott
("Stretched wings towards the South")

Edward Leicester Atkinson
("In Pectore Robur")

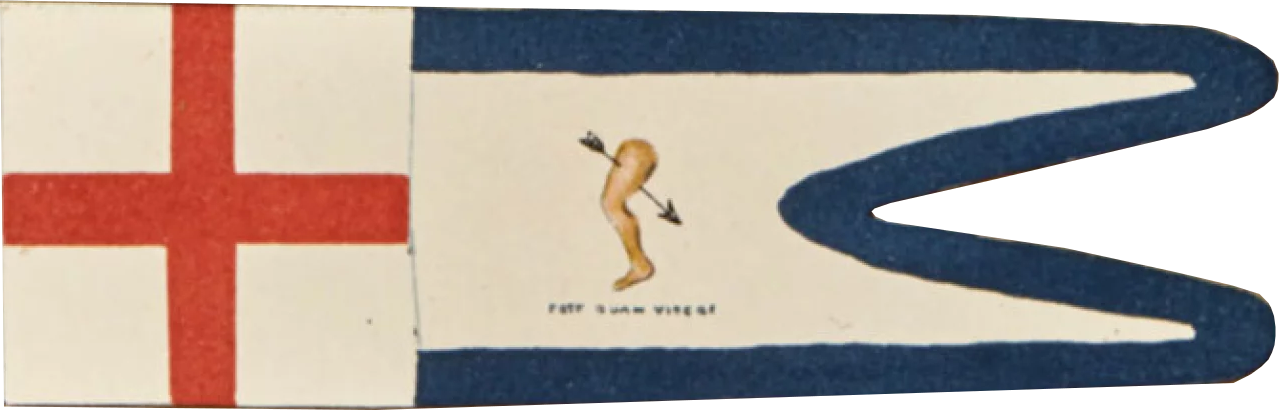
Henry Robertson Bowers
("Esse Quam Videri")

Victor Campbell

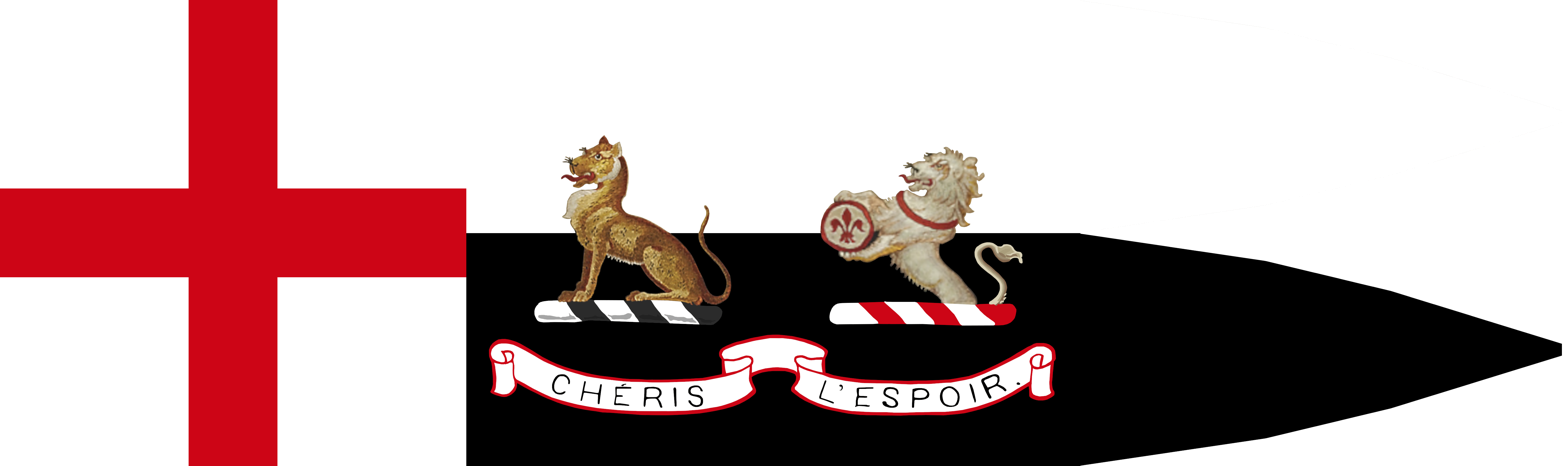
Apsley Cherry-Garrard
("Cheris L'espoir.")

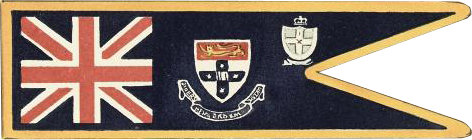
Frank Debenham
("Sidere Mens Eadem Mutato")

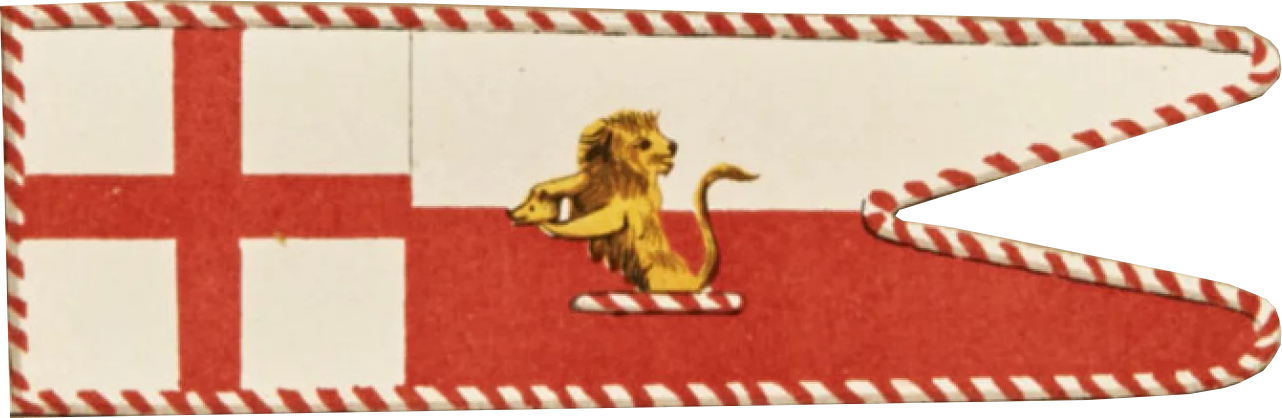
Edward Evans
("Perseverando")

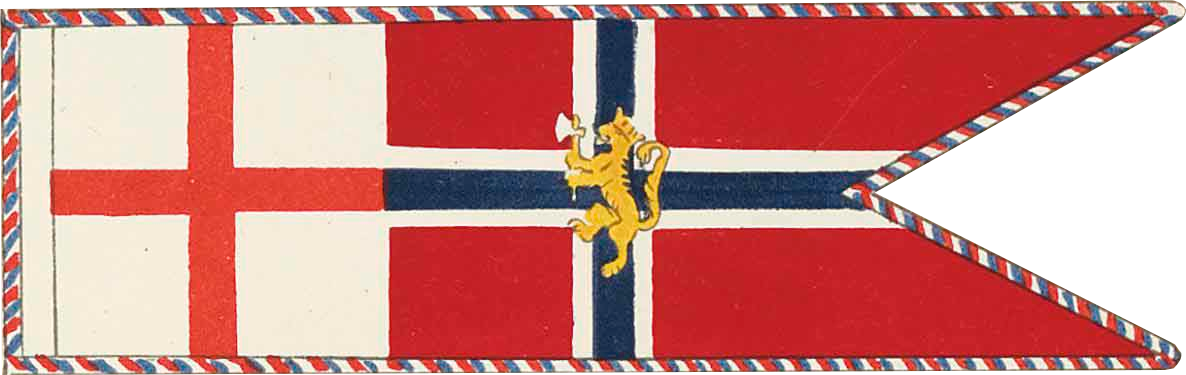
Tryggve Gran
("Norønafolket Det Vil Fare")

Patrick Keohane
("Erin go braugh")

Cecil Meares
("Omnia Providentiae Committe")

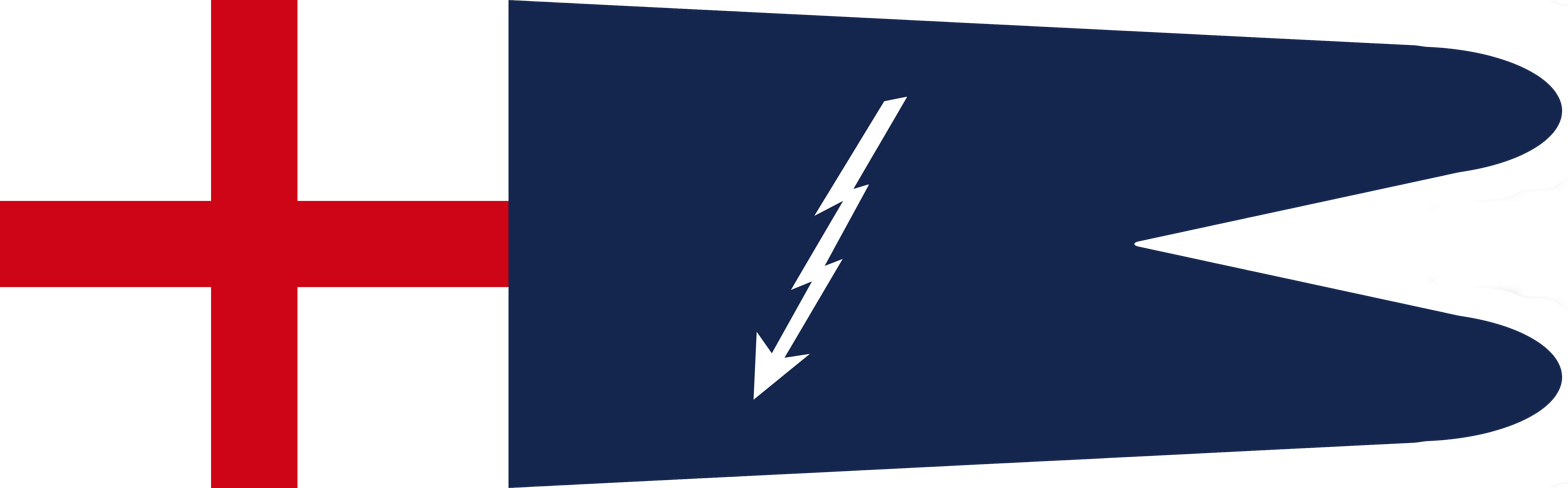
George Clarke Simpson
("Arduus Ad Solem")

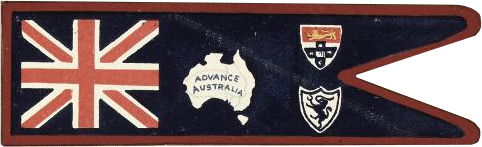
Thomas Griffith Taylor
("Expergiscimini")

Edward Adrian Wilson
("Res Non Verba")

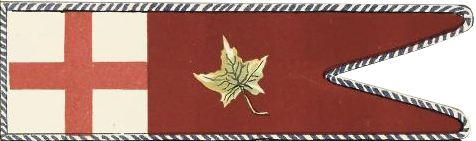
Charles Seymour Wright
("Labor Ipse Voluptas")

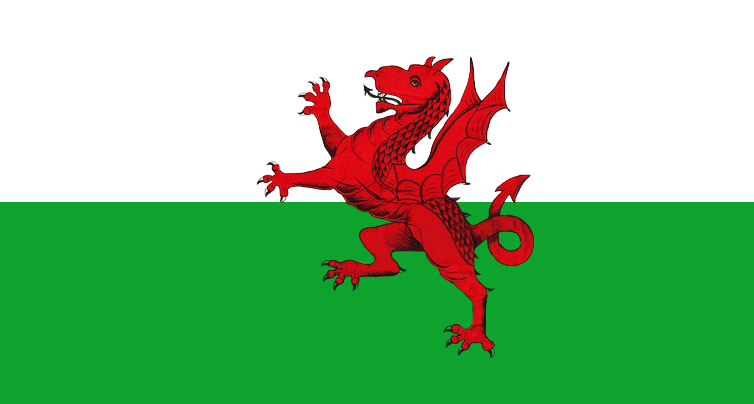
Flag of Wales taken to Antarctica

Flag of New Zealand taken to Antarctica

Flag of Gonville and Caius College, Cambridge taken to Antarctica

Flag of 4th Cardiff scout troop taken to Antarctica

==== Imperial Trans-Antarctic Expedition (1914–1917) ====
James Wordie
("Nil Indigne")

==== John Lachlan Cope's Expedition to Graham Land (1920–1922) ====
Thomas Wyatt Bagshawe

==== British Graham Land Expedition (1934–1937) ====
Brian Birley Roberts

== Antarctic base flags ==
Flag	Base	Country	Description
	Amundsen–Scott South Pole	United States	White variant of the flag of the USAP: plain white field charged with the logo of the United States Antarctic Program.
	McMurdo Station	United States	Light blue variant of the flag of the USAP: light blue field charged with the logo of the United States Antarctic Program.
	Palmer Station	United States	Blue variant of the flag of the USAP: plain blue field charged with the logo of the United States Antarctic Program.
	Captain Arturo Prat	Chile	Plain white field charged with the coat of arms of the base.
	Artigas	Uruguay	Plain light blue field charged with the logo of the base.
	Gabriel de Castilla	Spain	The flag of Spain with the emblem of the base in the center.

== Other flags ==
Flag	Date	Use	Description
	1897–1899	Historical burgee of the Royal Yacht Club of Belgium in Antwerp, which was used as a masthead pennant by the RV Belgica during the Belgian Antarctic Expedition of 1897–1899.	A white swallowtail pennant defaced with the intertwined initials "YC" in black and gold, and two red triangles placed along the hoist.
	1910–1912	Name pennant of the Fram during Roald Amundsen's Antarctic expedition. When Amundsen and four of his men conquered the South Pole in December 1911, they erected a tent from which this flag was hoisted underneath the Norwegian flag itself.	A white pennant surrounded by a blue border along the top and bottom and defaced with the name "FRAM." in blue letters.
Link to file	1949–present	Pennant of the Australian National Antarctic Research Expeditions	
	1979	50th anniversary commemorative flag of Byrd's historic flight over the South Pole.	
	2000–present	Burgee of the Ross Island Yacht Club Antarctica (RIYCA)	White represents the ice and purity. Blue represents the sky and valor. The silhouette depicts Shackleton's efforts on the waters around Ross Island. The Antarctic Skua, inspires freedom found in the south and a free meal wherever it may be found. The bloodshot red bowsprit reflects the directional desires on earth and on the wheel of life.
	2004–present	Antarctic Vexillological Association	Blue represents the 24-hour day of the summer season, black represents the 24-hour night of the winter season, and white represents the ice and snow of the Antarctic continent. The diamond in the middle if divided across the equator represents the "A" of Antarctica and "V" of vexillology. The diamond also represents the four compass points representing the compass points leading away from the geographic South Pole.
	2020	200th anniversary commemorative flag of Russia in Antarctica	
	?–present	Antarctic flag used by Quark Expeditions	
	2025	Flandrensis	The flag of Flandrensis features blue, yellow, and black horizontal stripes, with five white stars. Blue represents the surrounding sea and sky. The two large white stars represent Siple and Carney Islands, and the three smaller ones represent Cherry, Maher, and Pranke Islands. Yellow and black reflect the Flandrensian coat of arms. Its current national flag was adopted in 2025, replacing the original 2008 design.

== See also ==
- Vexillology
- Vexillological symbol
- Glossary of vexillology
- Civil flag
- Ensign (flag)
- Flag families
- Maritime flag
- National flag
- National coat of arms
- National emblem
- National seal
- National symbol
- State flag
- Galleries and lists:
  - Flags of Europe
  - Gallery of sovereign state flags
  - Gallery of flags of dependent territories
  - Lists of flags
  - List of flags by design
  - List of national flags by design
  - List of national flags of sovereign states
  - List of Japanese flags
  - List of United Kingdom flags
  - List of flags by color combination
  - List of sovereign states by date of current flag adoption
  - Gallery pages of flags of country subdivisions
