= National Philatelic Collection (United States) =

Collection of philatelic objects owned by the United States Government

- 38.8981°N 77.0208°W
- Location: National Postal Museum, Washington, D.C., United States
- Type: Philatelic collection
- Scope: National
- Established: 1886
- Branch of: Smithsonian Institution
- Branches: 1 (within the National Postal Museum)

Collection
- Items collected: Postage stamps, revenue stamps, and related items
- Size: nearly six million

Access and use
- Access requirements: A portion is on public display within the National Postal Museum. Access to the full collection may be restricted and require special arrangements.

Other information
- Curator: (Position held by a staff member of the National Postal Museum)
- Employees: (Part of the National Postal Museum staff)
- Parent organization: Smithsonian Institution
- Public transit access: Smithsonian (Metro station)
- Website: postalmuseum.si.edu

The National Philatelic Collection is a collection of nearly six million postage stamps, revenue stamps, and related items, owned by the United States Government and managed by the Smithsonian Institution. It is housed within the National Postal Museum and a portion of the collection is on display in the museum's National Stamp Salon. The National Philatelic Collection is among the world's largest and most valuable stamp collections and, along with the Postmaster General's Philatelic Collection, is one of two stamp collections owned by the United States.

== History ==
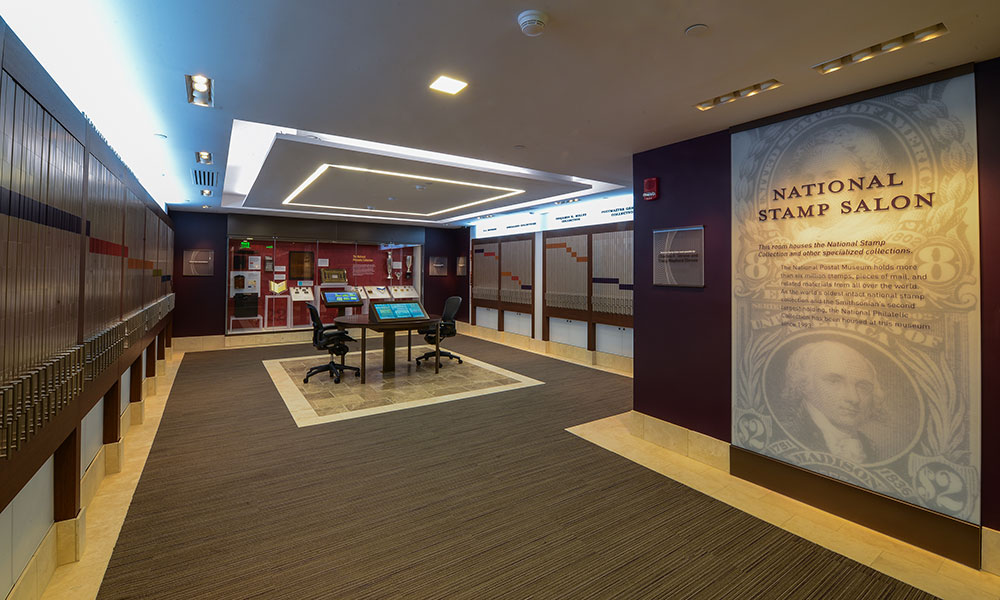
A portion of the National Philatelic Collection is on public display in the National Stamp Salon.

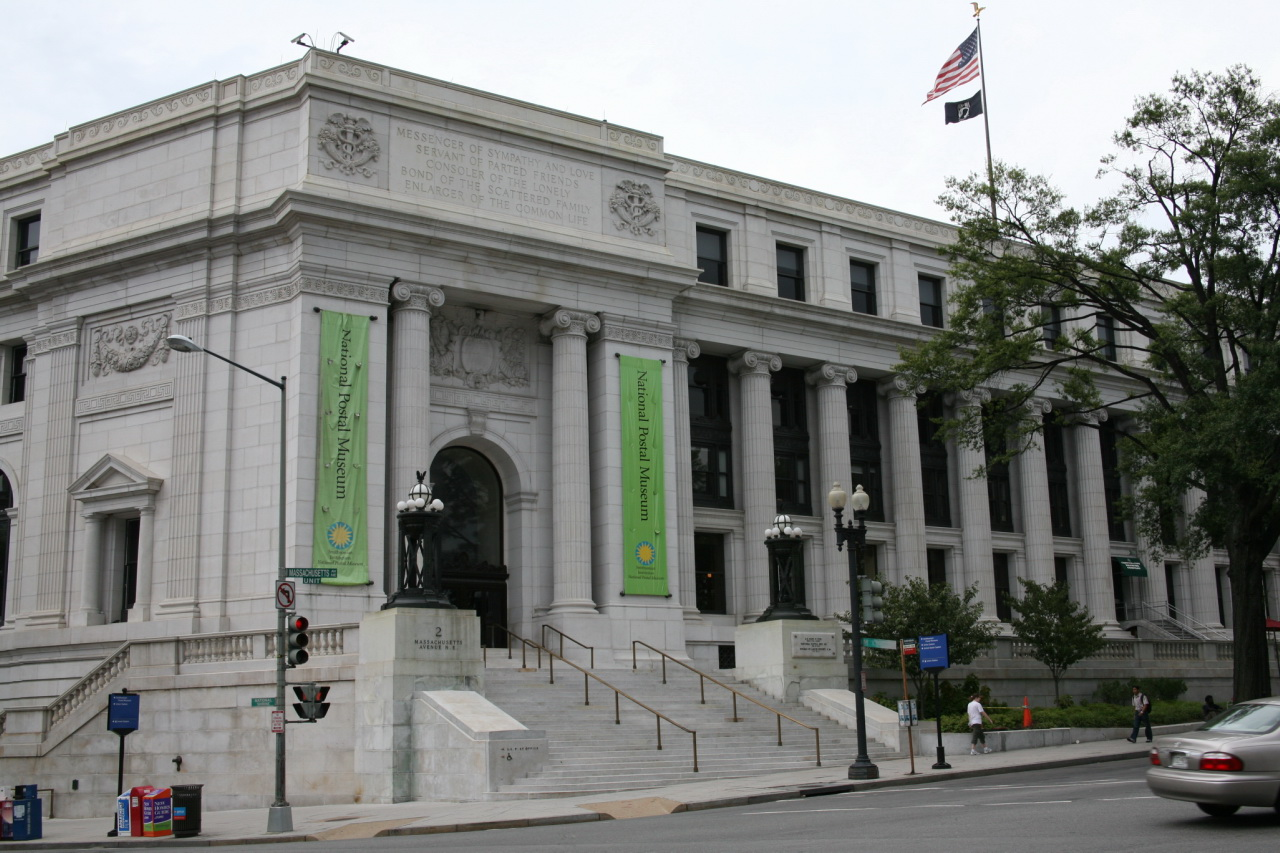
The National Philatelic Collection is housed at the National Postal Museum (pictured).

Established in 1886, the first piece in the National Philatelic Collection was a sheet of Confederate States stamps. The collection was subsequently expanded through the transfer of stamps from the United States Post Office Department and United States Postal Service, gifts from foreign governments, bequests from private stamp collectors, and the direct purchase of rare stamps. The National Philatelic Collection contains nearly six million items and approximately 4,000 specimens from the collection are on public display in the National Stamp Salon of the National Postal Museum. It is among the largest and most valuable stamp collections in the world and – according to the Smithsonian Institution – is the "largest continuously intact museum collection" on Earth. It is also the second largest collection of artifacts held by the Smithsonian Institution, after that of the National Museum of Natural History.

A large number of the specimens in the National Philatelic Collection have great value and, in 1986, the curators of the collection refused to participate in Ameripex 86 – an exhibition in Rosemont, Illinois, described by Linn's Stamp News as "one of the greatest international stamp exhibitions ever held" – after show organizers refused their requirements that stamps from the collection be housed under bulletproof glass and assigned a dedicated force of guards. In 2005, the United States purchased the boyhood stamp album of John Lennon to add to the National Philatelic Collection.

=== Management ===
There have been eleven curators of the National Philatelic Collection. The first curator, at the time officially titled "government philatelist", was Joseph Britton Leavy who was retained in 1913 to help organize the collection which had rapidly expanded due to a large donation from the Post Office the preceding year. As of 2018, the curator is Daniel Piazza.

== Related collections ==
The United States owns another stamp collection – the Postmaster General's Philatelic Collection, composed of United States stamps and stamp proofs – which was established in the 1860s and is managed by the United States Postal Service for archival and recordkeeping purposes.

== See also ==
- Royal Philatelic Collection
