= National Postal Museum =

Primary postal museum in the United States

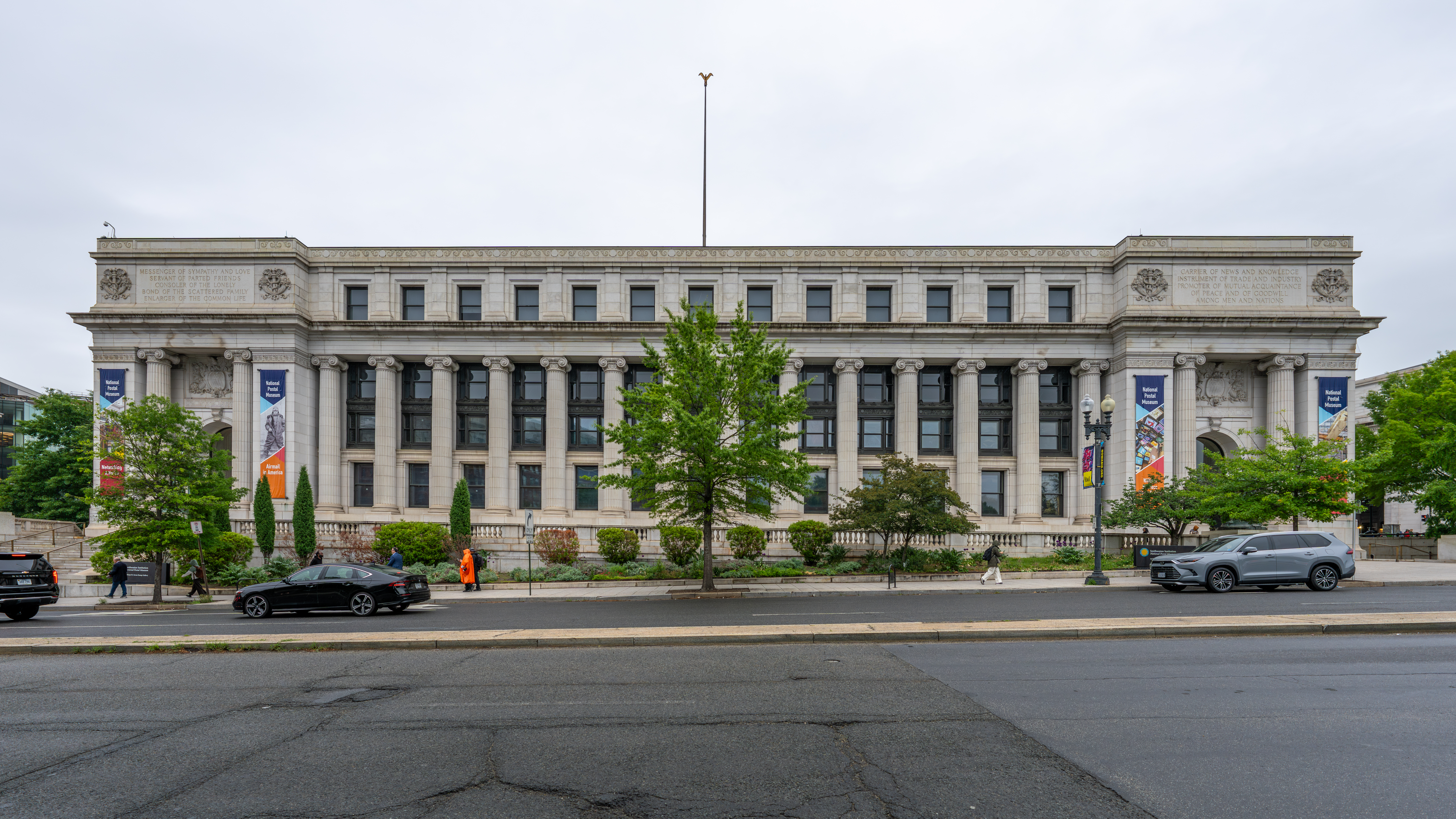
- National Postal Museum in 2026

- Location of the National Postal Museum in Washington, D.C. National Postal Museum (the United States)
- Established: July 30, 1993
- Location: Postal Square Building; Washington, D.C., U.S.
- Coordinates: 38°53′53″N 77°00′30″W
- Director: Elliot Gruber
- Public transit access: at Union Station; Amtrak/MARC/VRE at Washington Union Station
- Website: postalmuseum.si.edu

The National Postal Museum, located in Washington, D.C., is the primary postal museum in the United States. It covers large portions of the postal history of the United States and other countries. It was established through joint agreement between the United States Postal Service and the Smithsonian Institution and opened in 1993.

== Premises ==
The museum is located in the building that served as the main post office of Washington, D.C. for decades, from its construction in 1914 until 1986. The building was designed by the Graham and Burnham architectural firm, which was led by Ernest Graham following the death of Daniel Burnham in 1912. The headquarters of the United States Department of Labor's Bureau of Labor Statistics was once based in this building, in 2024 the BLS vacated the top floors. There is also space for a data center for the United States Senate. It is located across the street from Washington Union Station.

== Displays ==
The museum's atrium features vehicles used to deliver mail throughout the history of the USPS, including planes, trains and automobiles. Historical exhibits guide visitors through the postal service's inception and expansion, as well as its role in significant national events such as World War II. "Systems at Work" explores historic and current technologies involved in mail processing and delivery, such as message boxes, ZIP codes, optical scanners and conveyor systems.

The museum holds the National Philatelic Collection. The museum has a gift shop and a United States Postal Service philatelic sales window. Admission is free.

In 2005, the museum acquired the childhood stamp collection of the late singer/songwriter John Lennon. From June 2015 until December 2019, the museum displayed the 1856 British Guiana 1c magenta, the world's most valuable stamp, which sold for nearly $10 million.

In September 2009, the museum received an $8 million gift from investment firm founder William H. Gross to help finance an expansion project. The William H. Gross Stamp Gallery of the museum is named in his honor.

== Events ==
Since 2002, the museum has presented the Smithsonian Philatelic Achievement Award every two years.

== Gallery ==
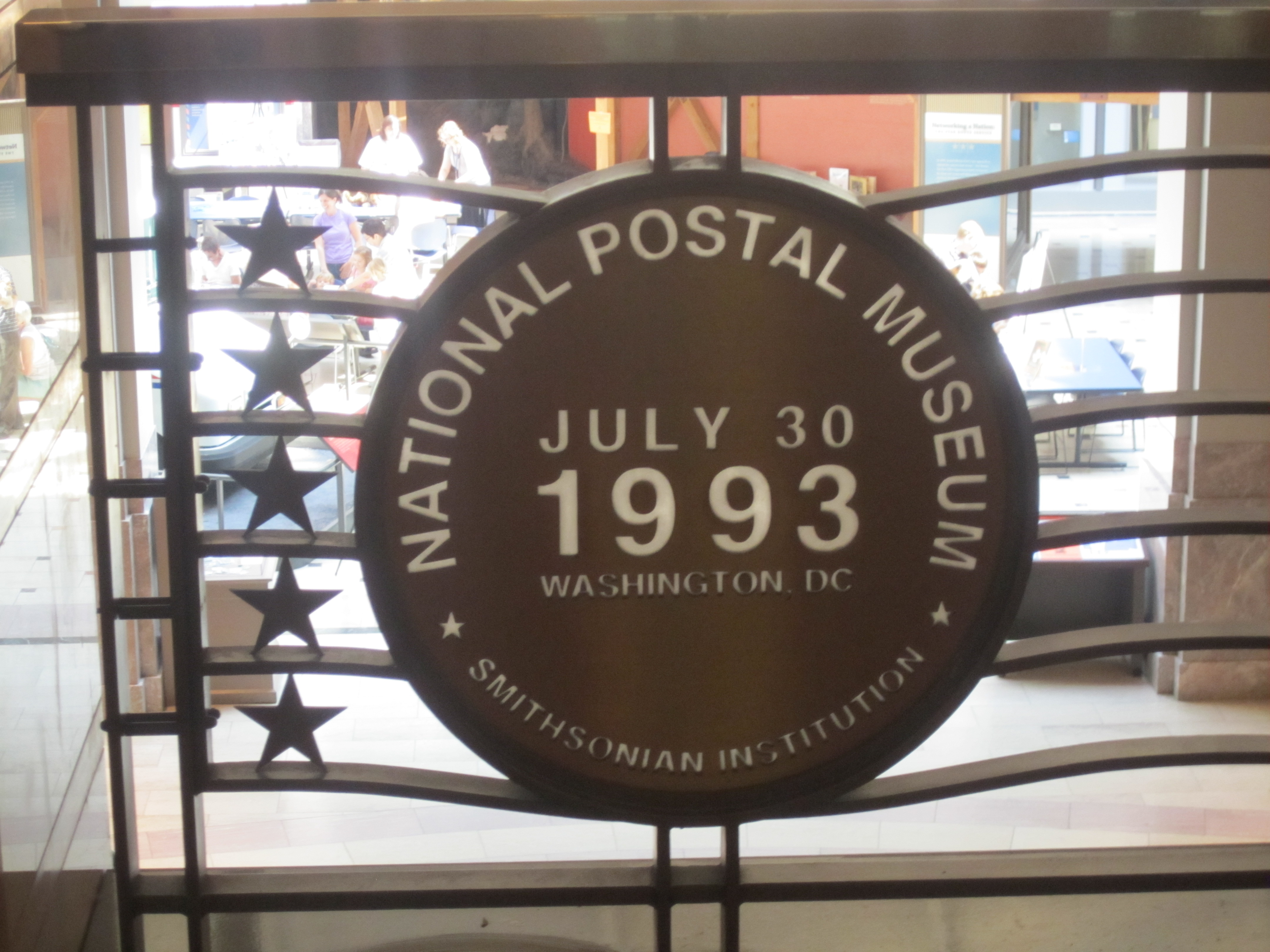
Opening sign for dedication of the National Postal Museum

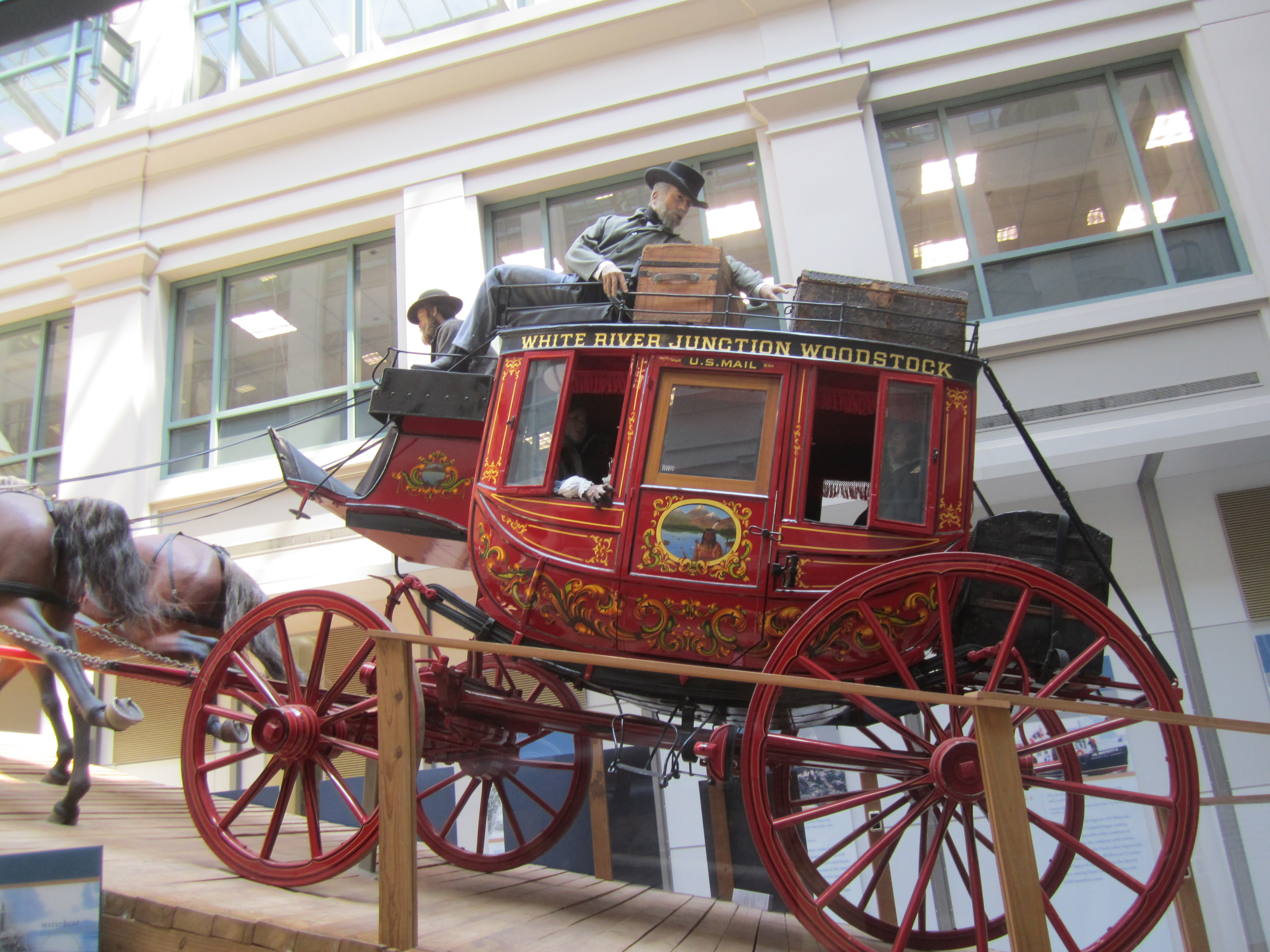
Mail-carrying stagecoach at National Postal Museum

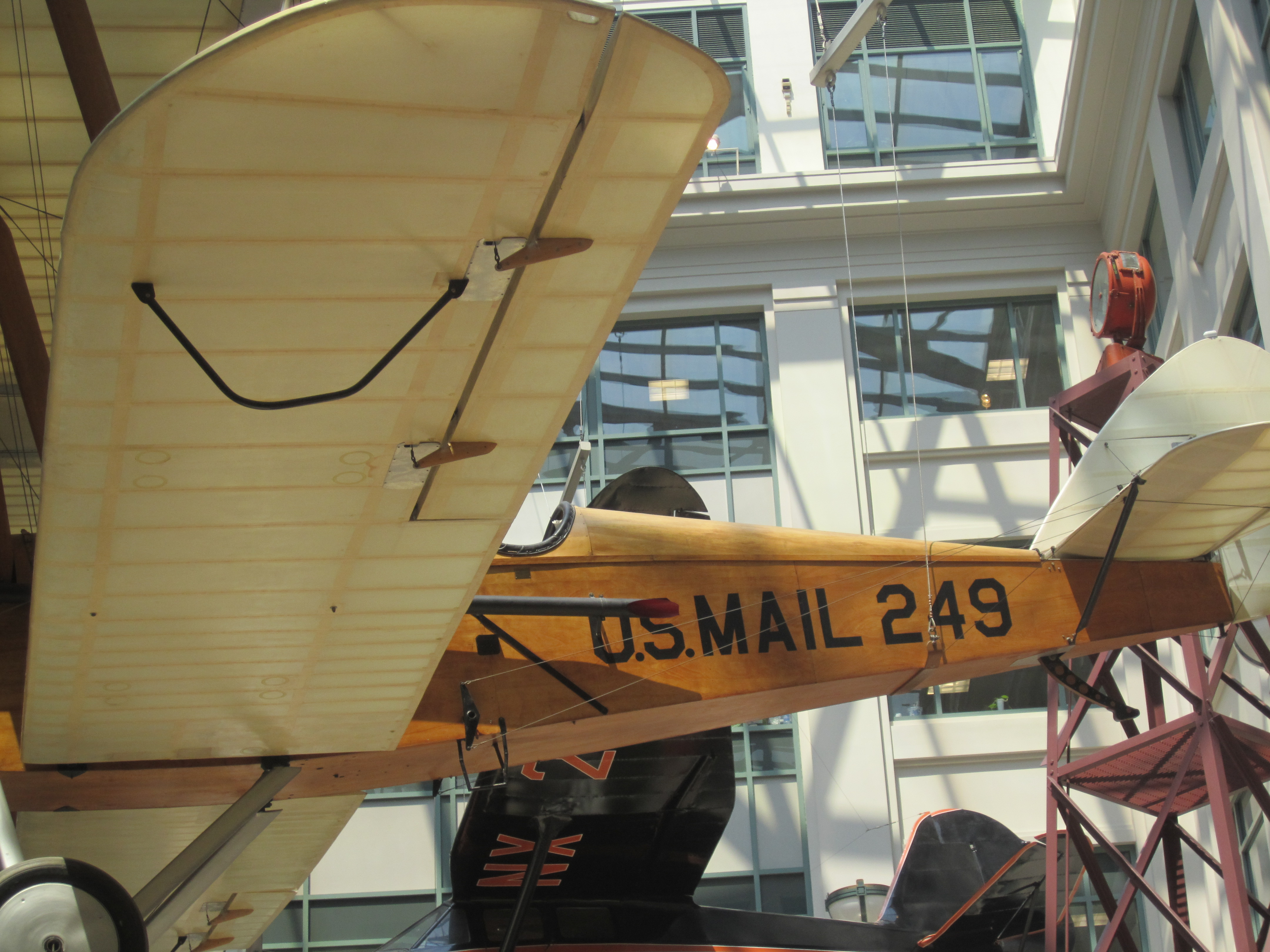
Air-mail plane anchored from the ceiling at the National Postal Museum

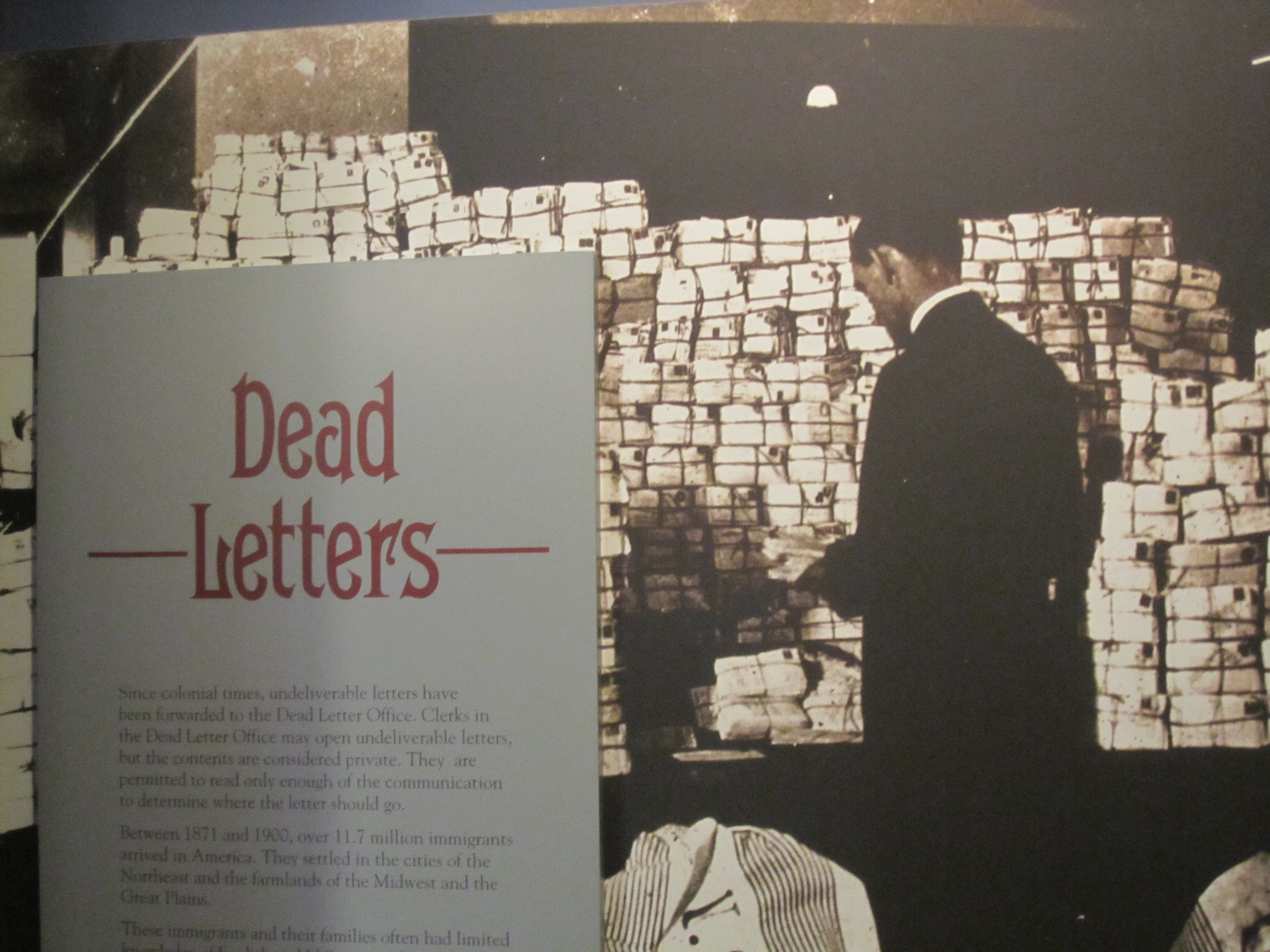
Dead letters exhibit at Postal Museum

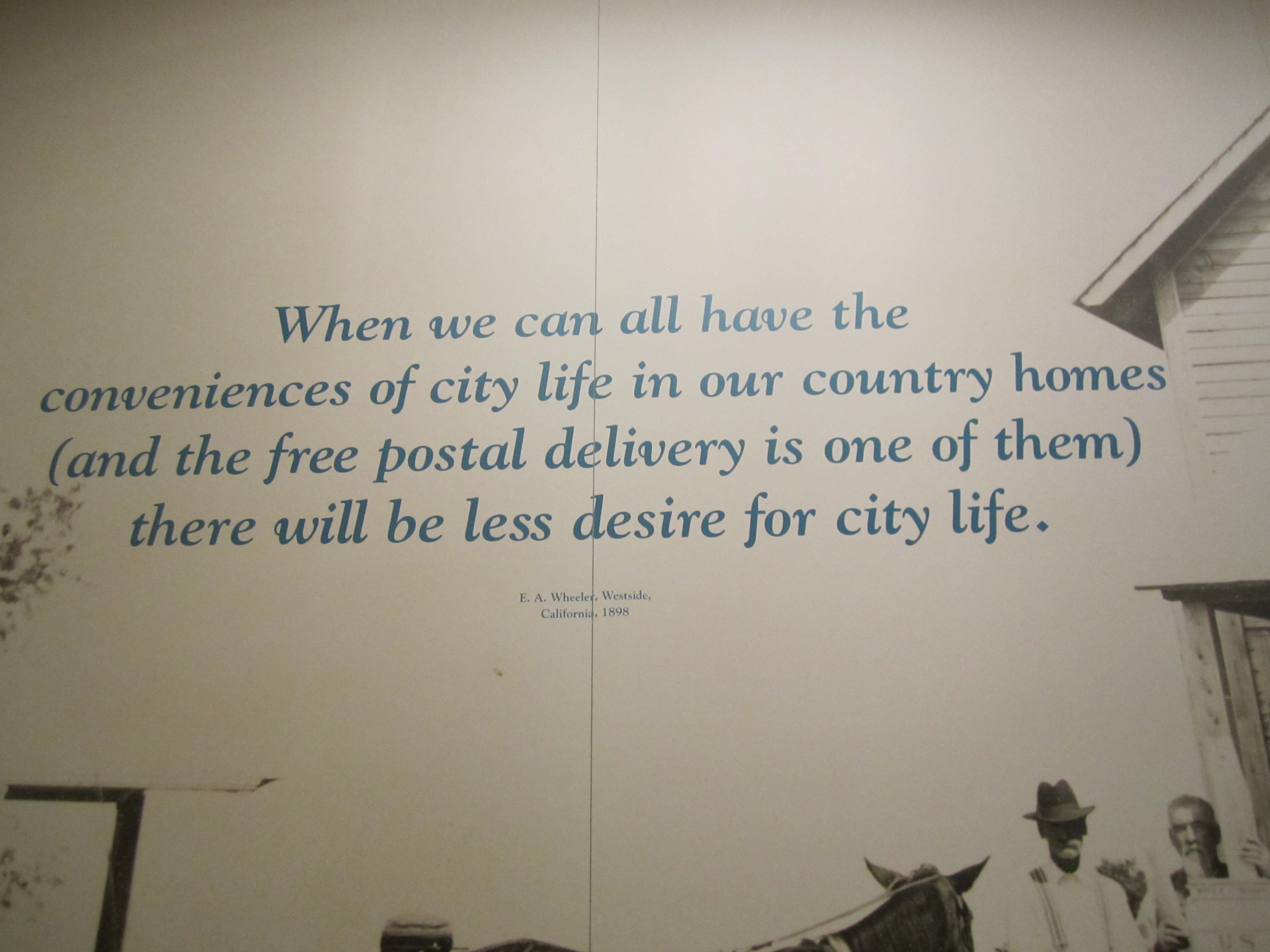
Museum poster extolling value of postal delivery

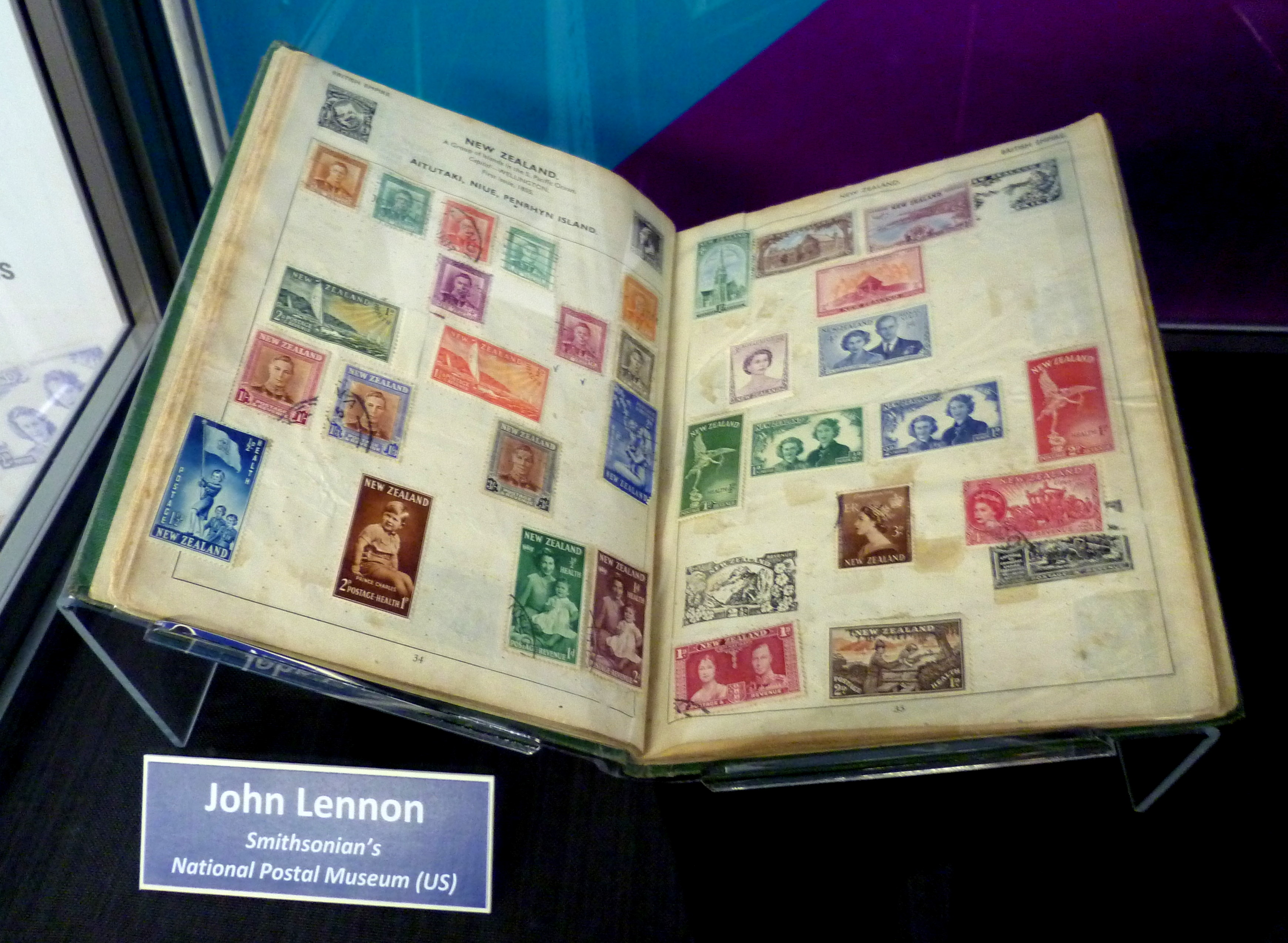
John Lennon's childhood stamp collection

== See also ==
- List of philatelic libraries
- Owney (dog)
- Postal museum
