= Flags of Asia =

A map of Asia with national flags, excluding dependent territories and partially recognized states (Taiwan not shown)

This is a list of international, national and subnational flags used in Asia.

== Supranational and international flags ==
An incomplete list of flags representing intra-Asian international and supranational organisations, which omits intercontinental organisations such as the United Nations:

Flag	Date	Use	Description
	1945–present	Flag of the Arab League	On a green background, two olive branches and 22 chain-links encircling a crescent and the name of the organisation (written in Arabic). The Arab League is an organization made up of countries in the Arab world in Northern Africa and Southwest Asia. Most, though not all of these countries use Arabic as their official language. The purpose is to find ways for the countries to have unity and to work together to solve their problems.
	1997–present	Flag of the Association of Southeast Asian Nations	A blue background with the emblem of the organisation in the center. In August 1967, Malaysia, Thailand, Indonesia, Singapore, and the Philippines formed the ASEAN. At that time, communism was growing in Vietnam, and these five countries were also facing problems inside their own countries. Nowadays ASEAN consists of ten countries, the aforementioned and Brunei, Cambodia, Laos, Vietnam and Myanmar.
	1991–present	Flag of the Commonwealth of Independent States	A blue background with the emblem of the organisation in the centre.
	1981–present	Flag of the Cooperation Council for the Arab States of the Gulf	Originally (and still colloquially) known as the Gulf Cooperation Council, it is a regional, intergovernmental political and economic union that consists of six Arabian peninsula countries.
	2011–present	Flag of the Organisation of Islamic Cooperation	A white background with a green crescent and globe, with the Kaaba at the center of the globe. The OIC has over 55 member states. The organisation tries to be the voice of the Muslim world. They try to safeguard the interests and the progress and well-being of Muslims.
	1960–present	Flag of the Organization of the Petroleum Exporting Countries	A blue background with the acronym 'OPEC' in stylized white lettering. OPEC was established in September 1960 in Baghdad, Iraq. Since 1965, the headquarters of OPEC has been in Vienna, Austria.
	2024–present	Flag of the Organization of Turkic States	The flag combines the symbols of the original four members: the light blue color of the flag of Kazakhstan, the sun of the flag of Kyrgyzstan, the star of the flag of Azerbaijan and the crescent of the flag of Turkey.

== Flags of Asian sovereign states ==
Flag	Date	Use	Description	Ref.
	1997–2001; 2021–present	Flag of Afghanistan; See also: List of Afghan flags	The flag of the Islamic Emirate of Afghanistan has the Shahada in black on a white background.	
	1918–1920; 1991–present	Flag of Armenia; See also: List of Armenian flags	After gaining independence, the First Republic of Armenia adopted the modern Armenian tricolor. The independent Armenian government selected the colours used during the last period of Rubenid Dynasty – red, blue, and yellow. The red emblematizes the Armenian Highland, the Armenian people's continued struggle for survival, maintenance of the Christian faith, Armenia's independence and freedom. The blue emblematizes the will of the people of Armenia to live beneath peaceful skies. The orange emblematizes the creative talent and hard-working nature of the people of Armenia.	
	1918–1920; 1991–present	Flag of Azerbaijan; See also: List of Azerbaijani flags	Originally adopted in 1918 as the flag of the Democratic Republic of Azerbaijan, it was officially adopted again in 1991, after Azerbaijan gained its independence from the Soviet Union. It consists of three equal horizontal bands colored blue, red, and green, with a white crescent and an eight-pointed star centered in the red band. The blue band refers to Turkic heritage, the red is for progress and the green refers to Islam.	
	2002–present	Flag of Bahrain; See also: List of Bahraini flags	Red with a white band at the hoist. The division between the two colors is a zigzag with five white points.	
	1972–present	Flag of Bangladesh; See also: List of Bangladeshi flags	A green field with a red disc slightly off-center towards the hoist.	
	1969–present	Flag of Bhutan; See also: List of Bhutanese flags	A diagonally-divided field with the upper hoist yellow and the lower fly orange. Along the diagonal line and facing away from the hoist is a white dragon, the Druk (Thunder Dragon), holding jewels in its claws.	
	1959–present	Flag of Brunei; See also: List of Bruneian flags	A yellow field divided by diagonal white and black stripes crossing from near the top of the hoist edge to near the bottom of the fly edge; superimposed over it is Brunei's crest, featuring a crescent facing upwards surrounded by hands and a parasol, all in red.	
	1948–1970 1993–present	Flag of Cambodia; See also: List of Cambodian flags	A horizontal triband of blue, red (double width), and blue, with a white depiction of Angkor Wat in the center of the red band.	
	1949–present	Flag of China; See also: List of Chinese flags	A red field with five gold stars in the canton; one large star is surrounded by four smaller stars surrounded in a semicircle and set off towards the fly.	
	1960; 2006–present	Flag of Cyprus; See also: List of Cypriot flags	The island is depicted in a copper shade representative of its name; the name Cyprus has roots in the Sumerian word for copper (zubar) from the large deposits of copper found on the island. The crossed green olive branches symbolise the hope for peace between the Turks and the Greeks. It was designed by İsmet Güney, a Turkish Cypriot painter.	
	1984–present	Flag of Egypt; See also: List of Egyptian flags	A horizontal tricolor of red, white, and black, with the eagle of Saladin in the center of the white band.	
	2004–present	Flag of Georgia; See also: List of flags of Georgia	A white field with a central red cross connecting all four sides of the flag; in each of the four corners is a small red cross. The flag is based on a historic five-cross design that dates back to the 14th century.	
	1947–present	Flag of India; See also: List of Indian flags	A horizontal tricolour of saffron, white, and green; in the centre of the white band is a 24-spoke wheel (the Ashoka Chakra) coloured in navy blue.	
	1945–present	Flag of Indonesia; See also: List of Indonesian flags	A bicolour; red on the top, white on the bottom.	
	1980–present	Flag of Iran; See also: List of Iranian flags	A horizontal tricolor of green, white, and red; the country's national emblem ("Allah") in red is centered on the white band; and the takbir (as written in the Kufic script) is written eleven times on each band in white.	
	2008–present	Flag of Iraq	A horizontal tricolor of red, white, and black; in the center of the white stripe is the takbir written in green Kufic script.	
	1948–present	Flag of Israel; See also: List of flags of Israel	A blue star of David, surrounded by two blue horizontal stripes, all over a white field.	
	1870; 1999–present	Flag of Japan; See also: List of Japanese flags	Adopted as a civil ensign on February 27, 1870. Officially adopted as a national flag on August 13, 1999. The flag consists of a white background with a red circle representing the sun.	
	1928–present	Flag of Jordan	A horizontal tricolor of black, white, and green, with a red triangle based on the hoist side containing a white seven-pointed star. The colors used are the pan-Arab colors.	
	1992–present	Flag of Kazakhstan; See also: List of Kazakh flags	A gold sun with 32 rays above a soaring golden steppe eagle, both centered on a sky blue background; the hoist side displays a national ornamental pattern called "koshkar-muiz" (the horns of the ram) in gold.	
	1961–present	Flag of Kuwait; See also: List of Kuwaiti flags	A horizontal tricolour of green, white, and red; with a black trapezoid based on the hoist side. Uses the pan-Arab colors.	
	2023–present	Flag of Kyrgyzstan; See also: List of Kyrgyz flags	A red field with a yellow sun with forty rays representing the number of tribes united by Manas (a Kyrgyz national hero). The sun is crossed by two sets of four lines, representing the roof of a traditional Kyrgyz yurt. The current design with straight sun rays was adopted in 2023 to reduce its resemblance to a sunflower.	
	1945–1946; 1975–present	Flag of Laos; See also: List of flags of Laos	A horizontal triband of red, blue (double width), and red. It has a white circle in the center symbolizing the full moon over the Mekong River.	
	1943–present	Flag of Lebanon; See also: List of Lebanese flags	A horizontal triband of red, white (double width), and red; charged with a green cedar tree.	
	1950; 1963–present	Flag of Malaysia; See also: List of Malaysian flags	Fourteen horizontal stripes alternating between red and white, representing the equalness of the Malaysia's thirteen member states and the federal territories; in a blue canton, a yellow crescent representing Islam and a fourteen-pointed star representing unity among their member states.	
	1965–present	Flag of Maldives; See also: List of Maldivian flags	A green field with a thick red border and a white crescent in the center.	
	1945–1992; 2011–present	Flag of Mongolia; See also: List of Mongolian flags	A vertical triband of red, blue, and red with a Soyombo symbol in the stripe at the hoist. The current flag was adopted in 1992 with the communist star above the Soyombo being removed. The colors were standardized in 2011.	
	2010–present	Flag of Myanmar; See also: List of Burmese flags	A horizontal tricolour of saffron, green, and red, with a large white star in the middle.	
	1962–present	Flag of Nepal; See also: List of flags of Nepal	The flag's overall shape is a double pennon; i.e., two juxtaposed triangular figures creating an irregular pentagon. The design consists of a red field surrounded by a blue border, with a white emblem of the crescent moon with eight rays visible out of sixteen in the upper part, and a white emblem of a twelve-rayed sun in the lower part.	
	1948–1992; 2026–present	Flag of North Korea; See also: List of North Korean flags	A horizontal triband of blue, red (nearly quadruple width), and blue, with white fimbriation between the bands. The red band is charged near the hoist with a five-pointed red star inside a white disc.	
	1995–present	Flag of Oman; See also: List of Omani flags	Two horizontal stripes of upper white and lower green, separated by a red stripe which joins a thicker vertical red stripe at the hoist that contains the national emblem of Oman.	
	1947–present	Flag of Pakistan; See also: List of Pakistani flags	A white star and crescent on a dark green field, with a vertical white stripe at the hoist.	
	1964–present	Flag of Palestine; See also: List of Palestinian flags	A horizontal tricolor of black, white, and green, with a red triangle based at the hoist.	
	1898–1901; 1998–present	Flag of the Philippines; See also: List of Philippine flags	Horizontal bands of blue and red with a white triangle based at the hoist. The triangle contains three yellow stars – representing three main islands of the Philippines: Luzon, Panay and Mindanao – and a yellow sun with eight primary rays representing the eight provinces that rebelled against the Spanish during the 1896 revolution: Manila, Cavite, Bulacan, Pampanga, Nueva Ecija, Bataan, Laguna, and Batangas. Also, a unique feature in the flag is when you flip it, it will change to its war flag.	
	1971–present	Flag of Qatar; See also: List of Qatari flags	Maroon with a white band at the hoist. The division between the two colors is a zigzag with nine white points.	
	1721–1922; 1993–present	Flag of Russia; See also: List of Russian flags	The flag was hoisted shortly after the former Soviet Union collapsed. The white, blue, and red horizontal stripes are Pan-Slavic colours. The colors were adjusted in 1993.	
	1973–present	Flag of Saudi Arabia; See also: List of Saudi Arabian flags	The Shahada and an Arab sword, coloured white, on a green background.	
	1959–present	Flag of Singapore; See also: List of Singaporean flags	A horizontal bicolour of red and white; charged in white in the canton with a crescent facing the fly and a pentagon of five stars representing the nation's ideals.	
	1883–1919; 2011–present	Flag of South Korea; See also: List of South Korean flags	A white field with a centered red and blue taegeuk surrounded by four trigrams.	
	1972–present	Flag of Sri Lanka; See also: List of Sri Lankan flags	Two fields separated by a golden border: the smaller hoist-side field has only two vertical halves of green and orange and the larger fly-side field is dark red with a golden lion holding a kastane sword in its right forepaw in the center and a bo tree (bodhi tree) leaf on each of the four corners, and the golden border around the entire flag extends in between the two separate fields.	
	2024–present	Flag of Syria; See also: List of Syrian flags	A horizontal tricolor of green, white, and black with three red stars along the middle stripe. The flag was previously used by opponents of the Bashar al-Assad regime and was adopted as the national flag in a de facto capacity following Assad's overthrow in 2024. It was later made the official national flag with the adoption of the country's interim constitution on March 13, 2025.	
	1992–present	Flag of Tajikistan; See also: List of Tajik flags	An unequal horizontal tricolor of red, white, and green in a 2:3:2 ratio, with a yellow crown surmounted by an arc of seven stars at the centre.	
	1917–present	Flag of Thailand; See also: List of Thai flags	Five horizontal stripes of red, white, blue, white, and red, the middle stripe twice as wide as the others.	
	1975; 2002–present	Flag of Timor-Leste; See also: List of East Timorese flags	Adopted in May 2002 (originally in November 1975 as East Timor), the flag consists of a red field; at the hoist is a white five-pointed star inside a black isosceles triangle superimposed on a larger yellow triangle that points toward the center.	
	1844; 1936–present	Flag of Turkey; See also: List of Turkish flags	A red background with a white crescent moon and star in its centre. The flag is called Ay Yıldız (literally, "moon star") or Albayrak ("red flag"). It was adopted in 1844 with the Tanzimat reforms; though the shape, placement, and shade of the colour vary. The geometric proportions of the flag were legally standardised with the Turkish Flag Law in 1936.	
	2001–present	Flag of Turkmenistan; See also: List of Turkmen flags	A green field with a vertical red stripe near the hoist side containing five carpet guls stacked above two crossed olive branches; a white waxing crescent moon and five white five-pointed stars appear in the upper field, to the fly side of the red stripe.	
	1971–present	Flag of the United Arab Emirates	A horizontal tricolour of green, white, and black with a vertical quarter width red bar at the hoist.	
	1991–present	Flag of Uzbekistan; See also: List of Uzbek flags	A horizontal tricolor of azure, white, and green, separated by two narrow red stripes. A white crescent and twelve white five-pointed stars in three rows are situated on the hoist side of the upper azure stripe.	
	1945–1955; 1976–present	Flag of Vietnam; See also: List of flags of Vietnam	A large yellow star on a red background.	
	1990–present	Flag of Yemen	A horizontal tricolour of red, white, and black.	

== Disputed or partially recognised states ==
Flag	Date	Use	State (status)	Description
	1992–present	Flag of Abkhazia	Recognized by 188 out of 193 UN member states as part of Georgia	Seven green and white stripes with a red upper hoist canton bearing a white open right hand and seven white stars.
	1984–present	Flag of Northern Cyprus	Recognized by all UN member states except Turkey as part of Cyprus	Adopted following the Turkish invasion and the occupation of the northern part of the island in 1974.
	1990–present	Flag of South Ossetia	Recognized by 188 out of 193 UN member states as part of Georgia	A tricolour of white (top), red (middle), and yellow (bottom).
	1945–present	Flag of Taiwan; See also: List of Taiwanese flags	Recognized by 142 out of 193 UN member states as part of China.	Although the flag of the Republic of China was adopted in 1928 in mainland China, this flag was flown from 25 October 1945 in Taiwan after the Surrender of Japan. It consists of a red flag with a blue canton containing a twelve-ray white sun.
	1916–present	Flag of Tibet	Recognized by all UN member states as part of China	

== Flags of Asian dependencies ==
Flag	Date	Use	State (status)	Description
Flag of Akrotiri and Dhekelia	1960–present	Flag of Akrotiri and Dhekelia	UK (overseas territory)	The Union Flag is used.
	1990–present	Flag of the British Indian Ocean Territory	UK (overseas territory)	
	2002–present	Flag of Christmas Island	Australia (external territory)	
Link to flag	2004–present	Flag of the Cocos (Keeling) Islands	Australia (external territory)	

== Flags of Asian cities ==
Flags of cities with over one million inhabitants.

Flag of Abu Dhabi, United Arab Emirates

Flag of Almaty, Kazakhstan

Flag of Astana, Kazakhstan

Flag of Baku, Azerbaijan

Flag of Bandung, Indonesia

Flag of Bangkok, Thailand

Flag of Busan, South Korea

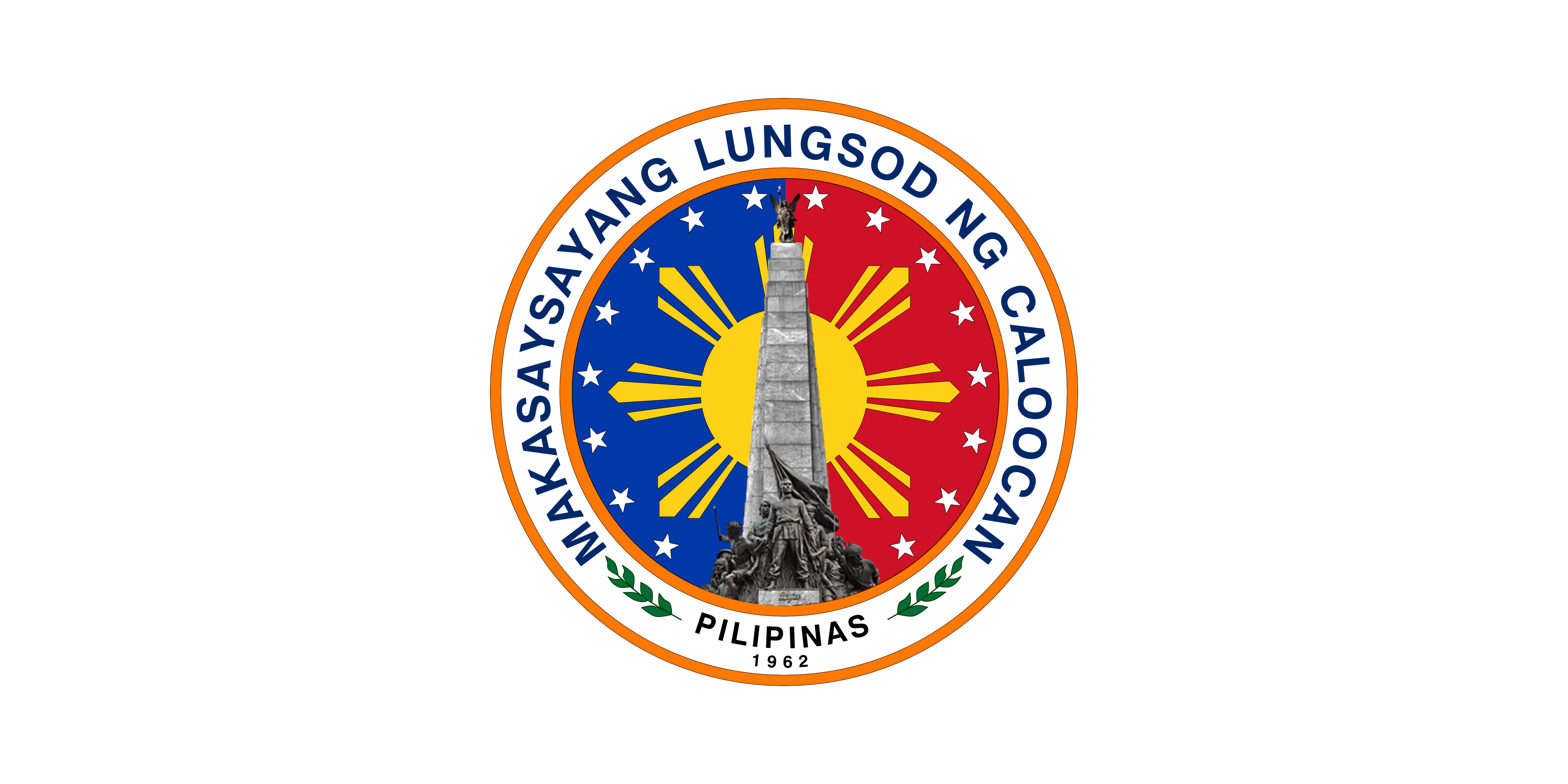
Flag of Caloocan, Philippines

Flag of Chelyabinsk, Russia

Flag of Daegu, South Korea

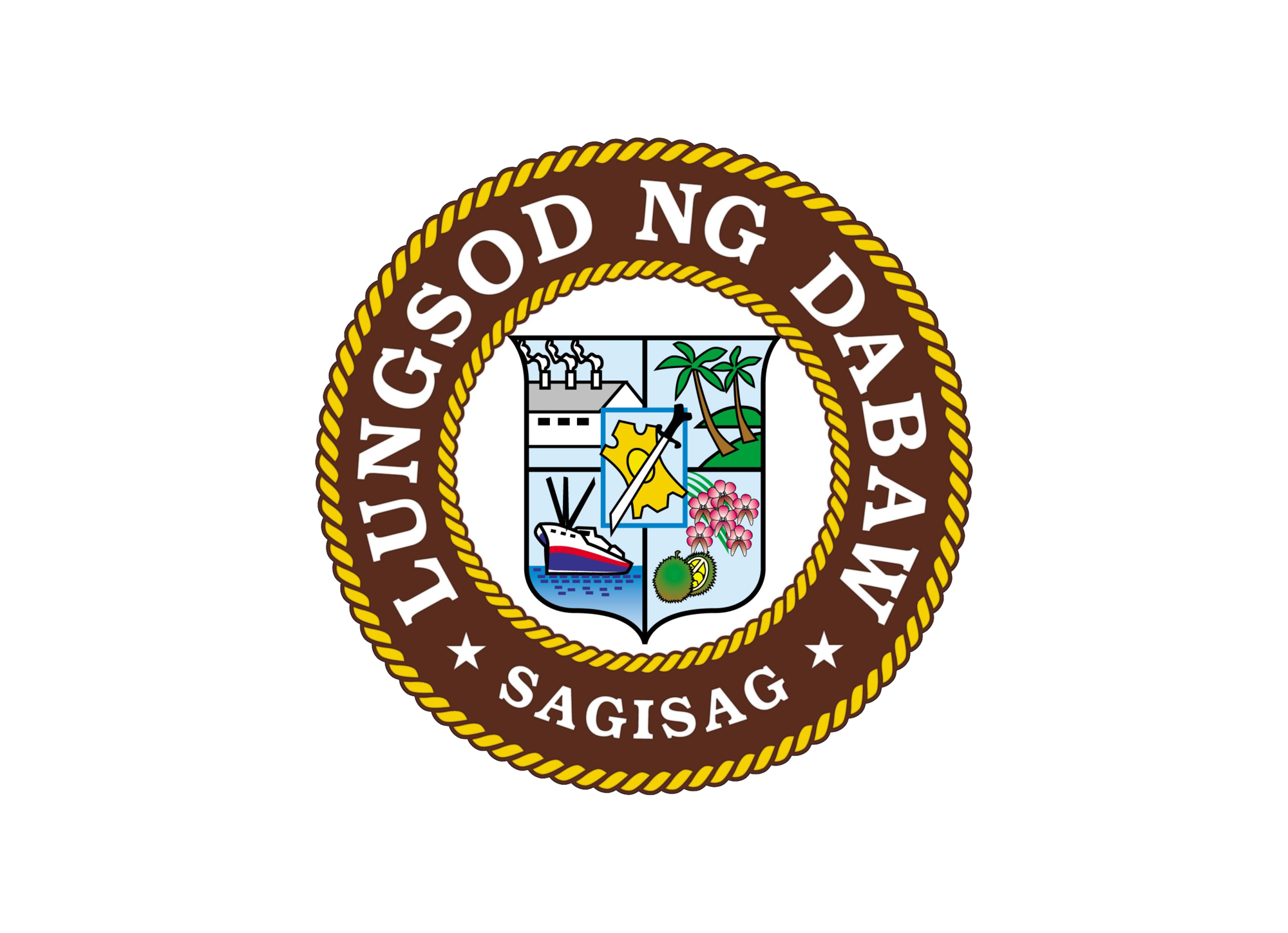
Flag of Davao City, Philippines

Flag of Delhi, India

Flag of Dubai, United Arab Emirates

Flag of Fukuoka, Japan

Flag of Hong Kong, China

Flag of Incheon, South Korea

Flag of Jakarta, Indonesia

Flag of Kaohsiung, Taiwan

Flag of Kawasaki, Japan

Flag of Kobe, Japan

Flag of Krasnoyarsk, Russia

Flag of Kuala Lumpur, Malaysia

Flag of Kyoto, Japan

Flag of Macau, China

Flag of Manila, Philippines

Flag of Nagoya, Japan

Flag of New Taipei City, Taiwan

Flag of Novosibirsk, Russia

Flag of Omsk, Russia

Flag of Ulaanbaatar, Mongolia

Flag of Osaka, Japan

Flag of Quezon City, Philippines

Flag of Sapporo, Japan

Flag of Seoul, South Korea

Flag of Singapore

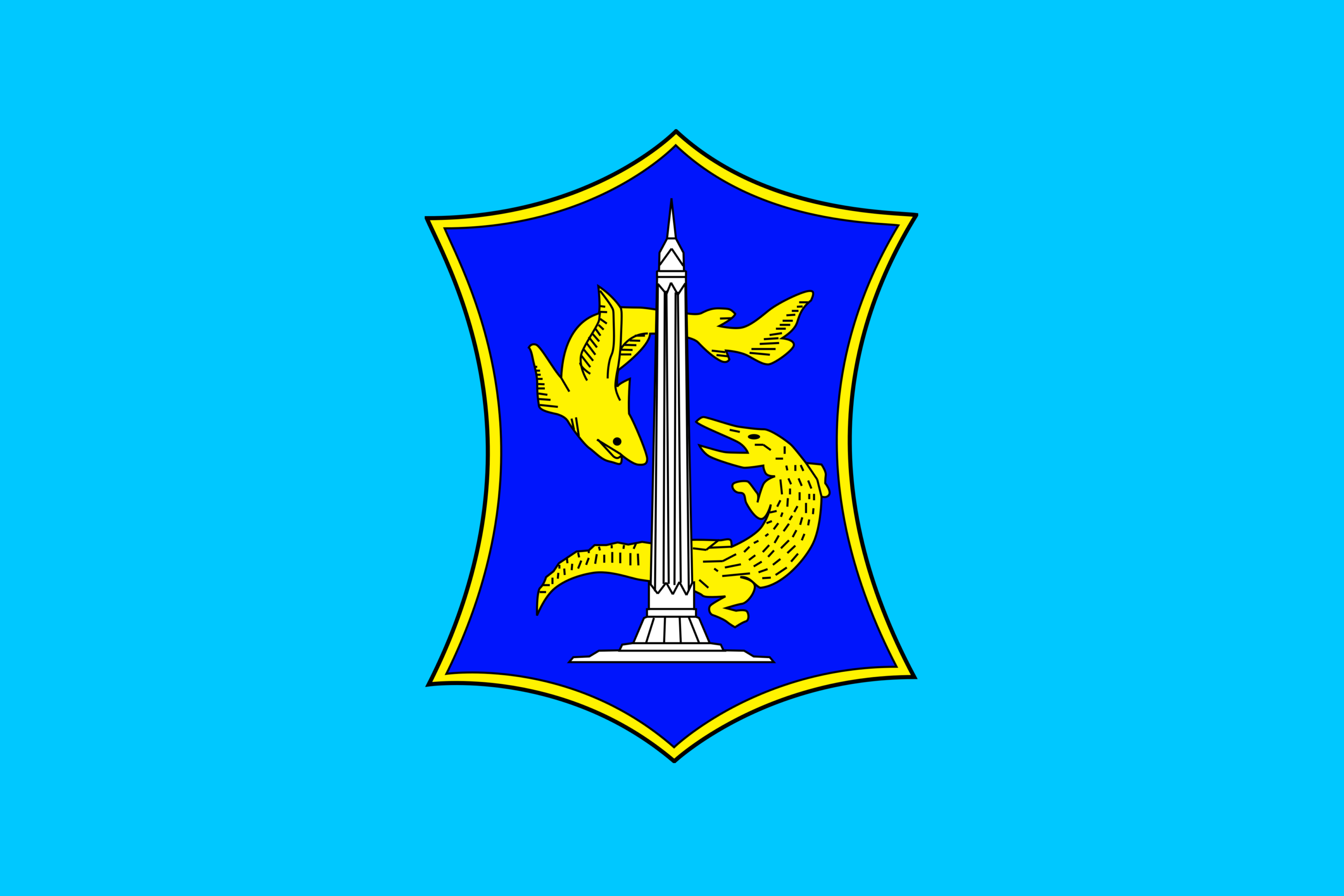
Flag of Surabaya, Indonesia

Flag of Taichung, Taiwan

Flag of Tainan, Taiwan

Flag of Taipei, Taiwan

Flag of Taoyuan, Taiwan

Flag of Tbilisi, Georgia

Flag of Tokyo, Japan

Flag of Yangon, Myanmar

Flag of Yekaterinburg, Russia

Flag of Yerevan, Armenia

Flag of Yokohama, Japan

Flag of Amman, Jordan

Flag of Kuwait City, Kuwait

Flag of Tehran, Iran

== Historical flags ==
Flag	Date	Use	Description
	1937–1963	Flag of Aden Colony	
	2013–2021	Flag of Afghanistan	Still sees some use internationally.
	1959–1962; 1962–1967	Flag of the Federation of Arab Emirates of the South and the Federation of South Arabia	
	1922	Flag of the Armenian Soviet Socialist Republic	
	1992–2023	Flag of Artsakh	Based on the flag of Armenia, with a blocky white chevron added to the fly.
	1918	Flag of the Democratic Republic of Azerbaijan	
	1920	Flag of the Azerbaijan Soviet Socialist Republic	
	1920–1921	Flag of the Azerbaijan Soviet Socialist Republic	
	1921–1922	Flag of the Azerbaijan Soviet Socialist Republic	
	1971–1972	Flag of Bangladesh	Used during the liberation war.
	1368–1906	Flag of the Bruneian Empire	
	1906–1959	Flag of Brunei	
	1795–1920	Flag of the Emirate of Bukhara	
	1875–1948	Flag of British Ceylon	
	1948–1951	Flag of the Dominion of Ceylon	
	1951–1972	Flag of the Dominion of Ceylon	
	1912–1928	Flag of the Republic of China	
	1928–1949	Flag of the Republic of China	Used on the mainland Chinese territory until 1949. It had the same flag as Taiwan.
	1398–1489	Flag of the Kingdom of Cyprus	
	1881–1922	Flag of Cyprus	
	1922–1960	Flag of Cyprus	
	1960	Flag of Cyprus	
	1960–2006	Flag of Cyprus	
	1975	Flag of the Democratic Republic of East Timor (1975)	
	1999–2002	Flag of United Nations Administered East Timor	
	1933–1934	Flag of the First East Turkestan Republic	
	1944–1949	Flag of the Second East Turkestan Republic	
	1920–1922	Flag of the Far Eastern Republic	
	1895	Flag of the Republic of Formosa	
	1990–2004	Flag of Georgia	
	1938–1939	Flag of Hatay State	
	1871–1876	Flag of British Hong Kong	
	1876–1955	Flag of British Hong Kong	
	1955–1959	Flag of British Hong Kong	
	1959–1997	Flag of British Hong Kong	
	1906–1980	Flag of Iran (Persia)	
	1980–1980	Flag of Iran	With the first IRI emblem.
	1980–1980	Flag of Iran	With the current IRI emblem and the first Takbir design.
	1924–1959	Flag of Iraq	
	1959–1963	Flag of Iraq	
	1963–2008	Flag of Iraq	
	1991–2004	Flag of Iraq	
	2004–2008	Flag of Iraq	
	1978–1993	Flag of Kampuchea	
	1991–1992	Flag of the Kazakh Soviet Socialist Republic	
	1917–1920	Flag of the Khanate of Khiva	
	1918–1920	Flag of the Kuban People's Republic	
	1922–1924	Flag of the Kingdom of Kurdistan	
	1927–1931	Flag of the Kurdish Republic of Ararat	
	1914–1921	Flag of Kuwait	
	1921–1940	Flag of Kuwait	
	1940–1961	Flag of Kuwait	
	1991–1992	Flag of Kyrgyzstan	
	1992–2023	Flag of Kyrgyzstan	
	1947–1975	Flag of the Kingdom of Laos	
	1946–1948	Flag of the Malayan Union	
	1948–1963	Flag of the Federation of Malaya	
	1911–1920, 1921–1924	Flag of the Bogd Khanate of Mongolia	
	1924–1940	Flag of the Mongolian People's Republic	
	1924–1940	Flag of the Mongolian People's Republic (alternative)	
	1940–1945	Flag of the Mongolian People's Republic	
	1945–1992	Flag of the Mongolian People's Republic	
	1974–2010	Flag of Myanmar	
	1961–1962	Flag of Netherlands New Guinea	
	1962–1963	Flag of United Nations Administered West New Guinea	
	1844–1922	Flag of the Ottoman Empire	
	1897–1898	Flag of the Biak na Bato	
	1898	Flag of the Biak na Bato	
	1943–1945	Flag of the Philippines	
	1946–1985, 1986–1998	Flag of the Philippines	
	1985–1986	Flag of the Philippines	
	1862–1889	Flag of the Qing dynasty	
	1889–1912	Flag of the Qing dynasty	
	1858–1883	Flag of the Russian Empire	
	1918	Flag of the Russian Soviet Republic	
	1918–1922	Flag of the Russian Socialist Federative Soviet Republic	
	1991–1993	Flag of Russia	
	1932–1934	Flag of Saudi Arabia	
	1934–1938	Flag of Saudi Arabia	
	1938–1973	Flag of Saudi Arabia	
	1877–1914, 1962–1967	Flag of the Kingdom of Sikkim	
	1914–1962	Flag of Kingdom of Sikkim	
	1967–1975	Flag of the Kingdom of Sikkim	
	1962–1967	Flag of the Federation of South Arabia	
	1922–1923	Flag of the Soviet Union	
	1923–1924	Flag of the Soviet Union	
	1924–1936	Flag of the Soviet Union	
	1936–1955	Flag of the Soviet Union	
	1955–1991	Flag of the Soviet Union	
	1843–1855	Flag of Siam	
	1920	Flag of the Arab Kingdom of Syria	
	1920	Flag of the Mandate of Syria	
	1922–1930	Flag of the Syrian Federation / the State of Syria	
	1930–1958, 1961–1963	Flag of the First Syrian Republic / the Second Syrian Republic	
	1963–1972	Flag of the Syrian Arab Republic	
	1972–1980	Flag of the Syrian Arab Republic	
	1980–2024	Flag of the Syrian Arab Republic	
	1991–1992	Flag of the Republic of Tajikistan	
	1916–1951	Flag of Tibet	
	1991–1992	Flag of Turkmenistan	
	1992–1997	Flag of Turkmenistan	
	1997–2001	Flag of Turkmenistan	
	1918–1921	Flag of Uryankhay Krai	
	1945–1955	Flag of North Vietnam	
	1955–1976	Flag of North Vietnam	
	1949–1975	Flag of South Vietnam	
	1960–1976	Flag of South Vietnam	
	1918–1923	Flag of North Yemen	
	1923–1927	Flag of North Yemen	
	1927–1962	Flag of North Yemen	
	1962–1990	Flag of North Yemen	
	1967–1990	Flag of South Yemen	

== Notes ==
Part of Transcaucasian Region, at the crossroads of Asia and Europe. Physiographically, Armenia falls entirely in Western Asia, while Georgia and Azerbaijan are mostly in Western Asia with small portions north of the Caucasus Mountains divide in Europe.
The island of Cyprus, which comprises the Republic of Cyprus, Northern Cyprus and Akrotiri and Dhekelia, is geographically located in Asia, closer to Asian Turkey than to the European mainland. However, the Republic of Cyprus is a member state of the European Union.
Turkey is a transcontinental country in the Middle East and Southeast Europe. Turkey has a biggest part of its territory (95%) in Western Asia called Anatolia.
Kazakhstan is a transcontinental country. Kazakhstan has a small part of its territories located west of the Urals in Eastern Europe.
The Republic of China (ROC) was the recognized legitimate government of China between 1912 and 1949. After its defeat in the Chinese Civil War, the Republic of China retreated to the island of Taiwan where it continues to govern today. In 1949, the People’s Republic of China (PRC) was established in mainland China. Since 1949, both the ROC and PRC officially claim to be the sole legitimate government of the entirety of China (including Taiwan). The flag of the ROC was thus the legitimate flag of China since its adoption in 1928 to 1949, whereas after 1949 its status has been linked to the political status of Taiwan.
Egypt is mostly situated within Africa, however the Sinai Peninsula lies in Asia.

== See also ==
- Flags of Africa
- List of Antarctic flags
- Flags of Europe
- Flags of Oceania
- Flags of North America
- Flags of South America

Lists of flags of Asian countries

- List of Afghan flags
- List of Armenian flags
- List of Azerbaijani flags
- List of Bangladeshi flags
- List of Bhutanese flags
- List of Bruneian flags
- List of Cambodian flags
- List of Chinese flags
- List of Cypriot flags
- List of East Timorese flags
- List of Egyptian flags
- List of flags of Georgia (country)
- List of Indian flags
- List of flags of Indonesia
- List of Iranian flags
- List of flags of Iraq
- List of flags of Israel
- List of Japanese flags
- List of Kazakh flags
- List of North Korean flags
- List of South Korean flags
- List of Kuwaiti flags
- List of Kyrgyz flags
- List of flags of Laos
- List of Malaysian flags
- List of Maldivian flags
- List of Mongolian flags
- List of Burmese flags
- List of flags of Nepal
- List of Omani flags
- List of Pakistani flags
- List of Palestinian flags
- List of flags of the Philippines
- List of Qatari flags
- List of Russian flags
- List of Saudi Arabian flags
- List of Singaporean flags
- List of Sri Lankan flags
- List of Taiwanese flags
- List of Thai flags
- List of Turkish flags
- List of Turkmen flags
- List of Uzbek flags
- List of flags of Vietnam
