= Oman at the 2025 World Aquatics Championships =

- Flag of Oman
- World Aquatics code: OMA
- National federation: Oman Aquatics Federation

in Singapore
- Competitors: 2 in 1 sport
- Medals: Gold 0 Silver 0 Bronze 0 Total 0

World Aquatics Championships appearances
- 2009; 2011; 2013–2015; 2017; 2019; 2022; 2023; 2024; 2025

Oman is competing at the 2025 World Aquatics Championships in Singapore from 11 July to 3 August 2025.

== Competitors ==
The following is the list of competitors in the Championships.

Sport	Men	Women	Total
Swimming	2	0	2
Total	2	0	2

== Swimming ==
Men

Athlete	Event	Heat		Semifinal		Final	
Athlete	Event	Time	Rank	Time	Rank	Time	Rank
Ali Al-Hasani	100 m freestyle	55.08	86	Did not advance			
Ali Al-Hasani	200 m freestyle	2:01.31	56	Did not advance			
Mohamed Al-Waheib	100 m backstroke	1:05.92	58	Did not advance			
Mohamed Al-Waheib	50 m butterfly	26.76	83	Did not advance			
