= Oman at the 2022 World Aquatics Championships =

- Flag of Oman
- FINA code: OMA
- National federation: Oman Swimming Association

in Budapest, Hungary
- Competitors: 1 in 1 sport
- Medals: Gold 0 Silver 0 Bronze 0 Total 0

World Aquatics Championships appearances
- 2009; 2011; 2013–2015; 2017; 2019; 2022; 2023; 2024

Oman competed at the 2022 World Aquatics Championships in Budapest, Hungary from 18 June to 3 July.

== Swimming ==
Omani swimmers have achieved qualifying standards in the following events:

Athlete	Event	Heat		Semifinal		Final	
Athlete	Event	Time	Rank	Time	Rank	Time	Rank
Nasser Saif Nasser Al Kindi	Men's 100 m backstroke	1:06.02	48	did not advance			
