= Oman at the 2024 World Aquatics Championships =

- Flag of Oman
- FINA code: OMA
- National federation: Oman Aquatics Federation

in Doha, Qatar
- Competitors: 2 in 1 sport
- Medals: Gold 0 Silver 0 Bronze 0 Total 0

World Aquatics Championships appearances
- 2009; 2011; 2013–2015; 2017; 2019; 2022; 2023; 2024

Oman competed at the 2024 World Aquatics Championships in Doha, Qatar from 2 to 18 February.

== Competitors ==
The following is the list of competitors in the Championships.

Sport	Men	Women	Total
Swimming	2	0	2
Total	2	0	2

== Swimming ==
Oman entered 2 swimmers.

Men

Athlete	Event	Heat		Semifinal		Final	
Athlete	Event	Time	Rank	Time	Rank	Time	Rank
Issa Al-Adawi	50 metre freestyle	24.60	73	Did not advance			
Issa Al-Adawi	100 metre freestyle	53.29	78	Did not advance			
Abdul Al-Kulaibi	100 metre butterfly	1:02.36	83	Did not advance			
