= Oman at the 2019 World Aquatics Championships =

- Flag of Oman
- FINA code: OMA
- National federation: Oman Swimming Association

in Gwangju, South Korea
- Medals: Gold 0 Silver 0 Bronze 0 Total 0

World Aquatics Championships appearances
- 2009; 2011; 2013–2015; 2017; 2019; 2022; 2023; 2024

Oman competed at the 2019 World Aquatics Championships in Gwangju, South Korea from 12 to 28 July.

== Swimming ==
Oman entered one swimmer.

Men

Athlete	Event	Heat		Semifinal		Final	
Athlete	Event	Time	Rank	Time	Rank	Time	Rank
Issa Al-Adawi	50 m freestyle	24.65	85	did not advance			
Issa Al-Adawi	100 m freestyle	53.81	88	did not advance			
