= Oman at the 2023 World Aquatics Championships =

- Flag of Oman
- FINA code: OMA
- National federation: Oman Aquatics Federation

in Fukuoka, Japan
- Competitors: 2 in 1 sport
- Medals: Gold 0 Silver 0 Bronze 0 Total 0

World Aquatics Championships appearances
- 2009; 2011; 2013–2015; 2017; 2019; 2022; 2023; 2024

Oman is set to compete at the 2023 World Aquatics Championships in Fukuoka, Japan from 14 to 30 July.

== Swimming ==
Oman entered 2 swimmers.

Men

Athlete	Event	Heat		Semifinal		Final	
Athlete	Event	Time	Rank	Time	Rank	Time	Rank
Issa Al-Adawi	100 metre freestyle	53.67	85	Did not advance			
Issa Al-Adawi	200 metre freestyle	2:00.09	68	Did not advance			
Abdul Al-Kulaibi	100 metre butterfly	1:01.18 NR	68	Did not advance			
Abdul Al-Kulaibi	200 metre individual medley	2:20.01	46	Did not advance			
