= List of Turkmen flags =

This is a list of flags in Turkmenistan.

== National flag and state flag ==
Flag	Date	Use	Description
	2001–present	National flag	A green field with a vertical red stripe near the hoist side, containing five carpet guls stacked above two crossed olive branches; a white waxing crescent moon and five white five-pointed stars appear in the upper field, to the fly side of the red stripe.

== Governmental flags ==
Flag	Date	Use	Description
	2007–present	Presidential standard	

== Military flags ==
Flag	Date	Use	Description
	1991–	Flag of the Ground Forces	
	1991–	Flag of the Air Forces	
	1991–	Flag of the Naval Forces	

== Historical flags ==
1925	Proposed flag of the Turkmen Soviet Socialist Republic	
1926–1937	1st Flag of the Turkmen Soviet Socialist Republic	
1937–1940	2nd Flag of the Turkmen Soviet Socialist Republic	
1940–1953	3rd Flag of the Turkmen Soviet Socialist Republic	
1953–1974	4th Flag of the Turkmen Soviet Socialist Republic	
1974–1992	5th and final Flag of the Turkmen Soviet Socialist Republic, first flag of the independent Turkmenistan	
1992–1997	National flag	A larger green field similar to the current design (without the olive branches).
1997–2001	National flag	A larger green field similar to the current design.

== See also ==
- Flag of Turkmenistan
- Emblem of Turkmenistan
