= List of Omani flags =

The following is a list of flags used in Oman.

== National flag ==
Flag	Date	Use	Description
	2004–present	National flag, civil ensign, state ensign	A horizontal tricolor of white, red, and green; with a vertical red stripe at the hoist, charged with the national emblem of Oman in the canton. (Proportion of 4:7).

== Royal flag ==
Flag	Date	Use	Description
	1749–present	Royal flag of Oman	A red field with a green and a red border and the royal emblem of the sultan in the center.

== Political flags ==
Flag	Date	Use	Description
	1965–1968	Flag of the Dhofar Liberation Front	A horizontal tricolour of red, white, and black.
	1965–1968	Flag of the Dhofar Liberation Front	A horizontal tricolour of red, white, and black with black Arabic text in the white stripe.

== Military flags ==
Flag	Date	Use	Description
	1970–present	Flag of the Royal Navy of Oman	A blue field with the national flag in the canton and defaced with the royal navy's emblem.
	1907–present	Flag of the Royal Army of Oman	A red field with the national flag in the canton and defaced with the royal army's emblem.
	1959–present	Flag of the Royal Air Force of Oman	A light blue field with the national flag in the canton and defaced with the royal air force's emblem.

== Historical flags ==
Flag	Date	Use	Description
	225–632	Standard of the Sasanian Empire	
	661–750	Flag of the Umayyad Caliphate	A simple white field.
	750–934	Flag of the Abbasid Caliphate	A simple black field.
	1508–1521	Flag of the Kingdom of Portugal	A white field with the Portuguese coat of arms in the center.
	1521–1578	Flag of the Kingdom of Portugal	A white field with the Portuguese coat of arms in the center.
	1578–1640	Flag of the Kingdom of Portugal	A white field with the Portuguese coat of arms in the center.
	1616–1640	Flag of the Kingdom of Portugal (putative flag)	A white field with the Portuguese coat of arms in the center.
	1640–1650	Flag of the Kingdom of Portugal	A white field with the Portuguese coat of arms in the center.
	1696–1970	Flag of the Sultanate of Muscat and Oman	A simple red field.
	1868–1971	Flag of the Imamate of Muscat and Oman	A simple white field.
	1954–1959	Flag of the Imamate of Oman	A white field with red Arabic script and a red sword pointed to the right below.
	1970–1985	Flag of Oman	A horizontal tricolor of white, red, and green; with a vertical red stripe at the hoist, charged with the National Emblem of Oman, the red stripe is smaller than the other ones.
	1985–1995	Flag of Oman	A horizontal tricolor of white, red, and green; with a vertical red stripe at the hoist, charged with the national emblem of Oman (Proportion of 3:2).

== See also ==
- Flag of Oman
- National emblem of Oman
