= Flag of Turkmenistan =

Turkmenistan
- Türkmenistanyň baýdagy (Turkmen)
- Use: National flag
- Proportion: 2:3
- Adopted: 19 February 1992; 34 years ago (original version); 24 January 2001; 25 years ago (current version)
- Design: A green field with a vertical red stripe near the hoist side, containing five carpet guls stacked above two crossed olive branches; a white waxing crescent moon and five white five-pointed stars appear in the upper field, to the fly side of the red stripe
- Use: Presidential standard
- Proportion: 2:3
- Adopted: 27 September 1992 (original version); 14 February 2007 (current version)

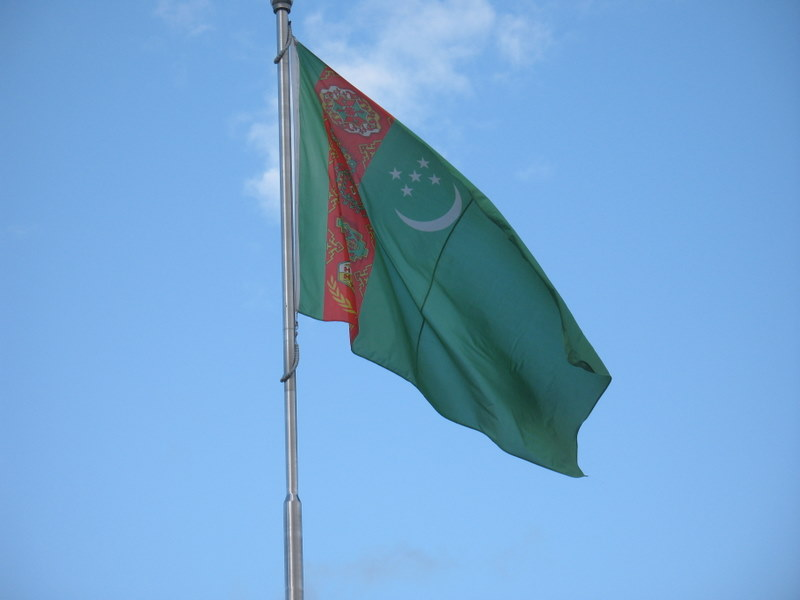
Flying flag of Turkmenistan

The national flag of Turkmenistan (Turkmen: Türkmenistanyň baýdagy) features a white crescent and five stars representing the five regions of the country and the Five Pillars of Islam. Placed upon a green field is a symbolic representation of the country's famous carpet industry. It was introduced as the flag of Turkmenistan on 27 September 1992 to replace the Soviet-era flag. The modified version with a 2:3 ratio was adopted on 24 January 2001. State Flag and Constitution Day is celebrated on 18 May.

== Design ==
=== Description ===
The flag features a green field with a vertical red stripe on the hoist side, containing five carpet guls (designs used in producing rugs) stacked above two crossed olive branches similar to those on the flag of the United Nations. A white crescent moon and five white five-pointed stars appear as a charge on the fly side of the red stripe.

=== Colors ===
Color scheme	Green	Red	Yellow	Black
Pantone	348 C	1795 C	123 C	Black C
RGB	0–133–58	210–38–48	255–199–44	56–55–57
CMYK	100-0-56-48	0-82-77-18	0-22-83-0	2-4-0-78
Web colors	00853A	D22630	FFC72C	383739

=== Symbolism ===
While no official explanation has been given for the symbolism of the flag's colors or white symbols, there are several leading theories. Some such as the Russian Centre of Vexillology and Heraldry claim that the green field stands for life, land, grass, prosperity, and peace, while the crescent moon symbolizes the clear sky above Turkmenistan's people. They claim the stars represent the five provinces (welaýatlar) of Turkmenistan: Ahal, Balkan, Daşoguz, Lebap and Mary. Soon after the flag was adopted, multiple newspapers gave their own explanations of the flag's symbolism, claiming that the color green was chosen to resemble banners historically used by the Turkmen people, and the color white was chosen to represent the brightness of life. They also reported that the five points on the stars represented the five states of matter, solid, liquid, gas, plasma, and crystal, while the number of stars represented the five main preconditions of life, light, sound, taste, smell, and feeling. The newspapers stated that stars and crescent moon together symbolized the belief in a bright future.

The five traditional carpet guls represent the five major tribes of Turkmenistan, and form motifs in the country's state emblem and flag. The Turkmen tribes in traditional order (as well as top to bottom) are the Teke, Yomut, Saryk, Chowdur, and Ersari.

Teke

Yomut

Saryk

Chowdur

Ersari

== History ==
=== Turkmen Soviet Socialist Republic ===
On October 6, 1926, the Constitution of the Turkmen SSR was adopted, instating the first flag of the Turkmen Soviet Socialist Republic. The flag was a red field, with a gold-bordered red star and golden hammer and sickle in its canton. On March 2, 1937, a new constitution was adopted, changing the flag to a red banner with the gold letters "T.S.S.R." in its canton. On July 19, 1940, the Latin letters in the canton were changed to Cyrillic letters, to match the Republic's new alphabet. The letters in the canton were now "T.C.C.P.". On August 1, 1953, a decree from the Presidium of the Supreme Soviet of the Turkmen SSR changed the flag to a red field with two horizontal blue bars in its middle, and a golden hammer and sickle and gold-bordered red star in its canton. The state constitution was amended to address this change. On September 23, 1974, the Presidium again modified the flag, moving the star and hammer and sickle to border the hoist. No modifications would be made to the flag's design until Turkmenistan gained independence.

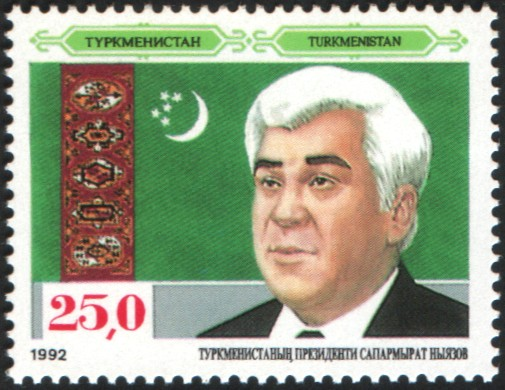
The flag on a Turkmenistan postage stamp, 1992.

=== Modern flag ===
After independence in 1991, the government of Turkmenistan decided to change its national symbols, including the flag. In early February 1992 an exhibition was held at the hall of the Union of Artists in Ashgabat, which displayed proposed flags and coats of arms from across the country. That same month, members of the 13th meeting of the Supreme Soviet were tasked with choosing a flag from the proposed designs. On February 19, 1992, the new flag was signed into law. On March 21, 1992, the Turkmen New Year, president Saparmurat Niyazov raised the flag for the first time.

On January 29, 1997, amendments were made to the Law of Turkmenistan On the State Flag of Turkmenistan. An olive branch, a common symbol of the United Nations, was added to the national flag following the United Nations' proclamation of Turkmenistan's permanent neutrality on December 12, 1995. This was done to commemorate the principles of neutrality in the national symbols of Turkmenistan. The positioning of the crescent and stars was also changed, with the crescent positioned roughly to its current position but with the stars in a much more uneven position.

In 24 January 2001, the flag's proportion was changed from 1:2 to 2:3 and the green field was made lighter.

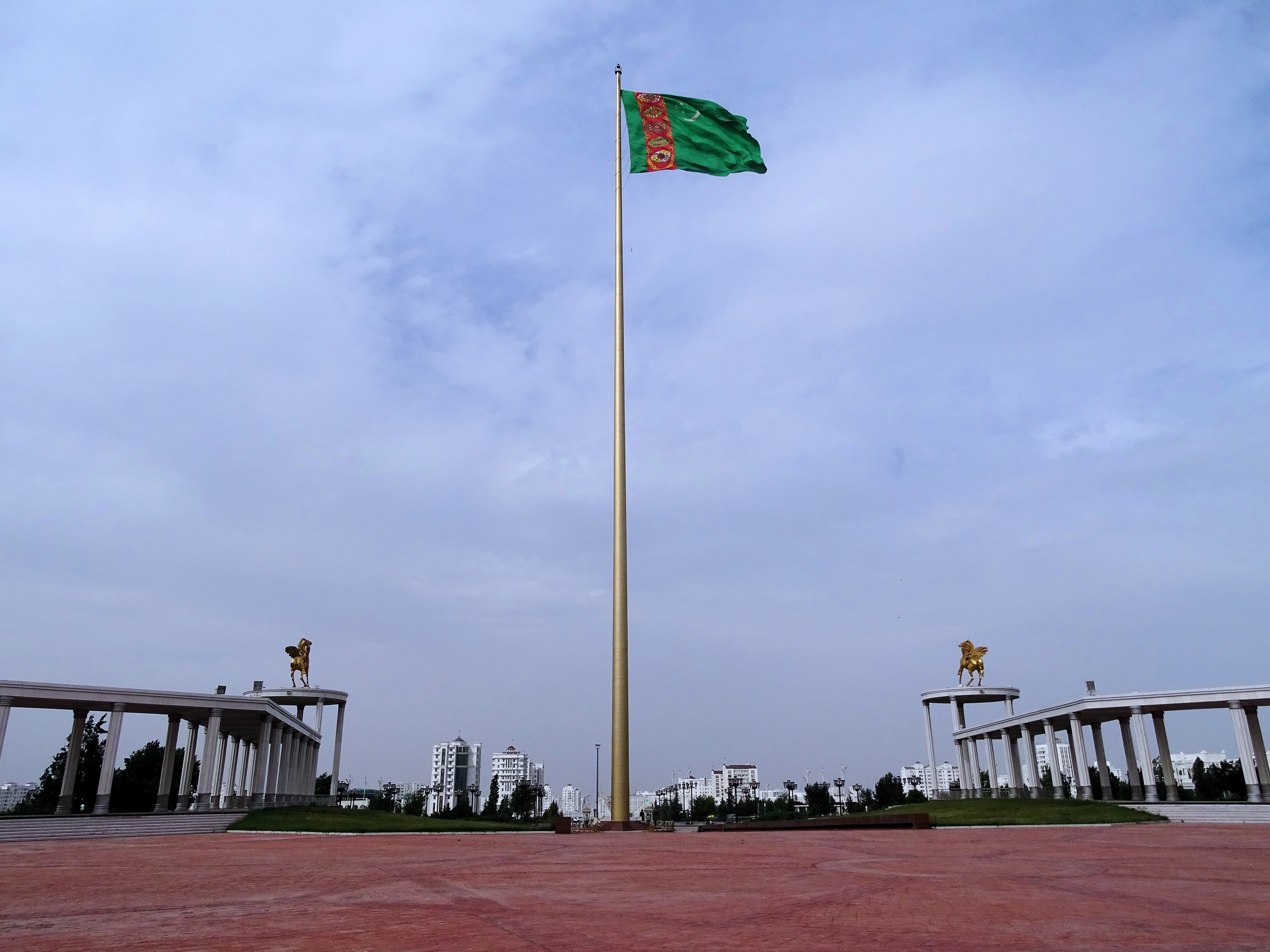
Ashgabat Flagpole

In 2008, a giant flagpole standing 133 meters (436 ft) tall and flying the Turkmen flag was installed in front of The State Museum of the State Cultural Center of Turkmenistan in Ashgabat. The flag measures 52.5 by 35 meters (172 by 115 ft) and weighs 420 kilograms (930 lb). The flagpole was entered into the Guinness World Records. An honorary guard is stationed at its base.

Flag	Date	Use	Description
	1926–1937	Flag of the Turkmen SSR	A plain red field with a golden hammer and sickle and a gold-bordered red star in its canton
	1937–1940	Flag of the Turkmen SSR	A plain red field with the golden letters TSSR in its canton
	1940–1953	Flag of the Turkmen SSR	A plain red field with the golden letters ТССР in its canton
	1953–1974	Flag of the Turkmen SSR	A red field with two blue bars transversing it in the middle. A golden hammer and sickle and a gold-bordered red star are placed in its canton
	1974–1991	Flag of the Turkmen SSR	Similar to the previous flag of the Turkmen SSR, with the golden hammer and sickle, and gold-bordered start placed to border the hoist
	1991–1992	Flag of Turkmenistan	Similar to the previous flag of the Turkmen SSR, with the golden hammer and sickle, and gold-bordered start placed to border the hoist
	1992–1997	Flag of Turkmenistan	A green field with a 1:2 proportion. A vertical red stripe is near the hoist side, containing five carpet guls. A white crescent moon and five white five-pointed stars are placed to the right of the stripe
	1997–2001	Flag of Turkmenistan	Similar to the previous flag, with a golden olive branch added to the bottom of the red stripe
	2001–present	Flag of Turkmenistan	Similar to the previous flag, with a 2:3 proportion

== See also ==
- List of Turkmen flags
- Emblem of Turkmenistan
