= List of Kuwaiti flags =

The following is a list of flags, standards, and banners used in Kuwait.

== National flag ==
Flag	Date	Use	Description
	1961–present	Flag of Kuwait	A horizontal triband of green, white, and red; with a black trapezium based on the hoist side.

== Royal flag ==
Flag	Date	Use	Description
	1961–present	Flag of the emir of Kuwait	A horizontal triband of green, white, and red; with a black trapezium based on the hoist side with a golden crown in the center of the green stripe.

== Former royal flags ==
Flag	Date	Use	Description
	1956–1961	Flag of the emir of Kuwait	
	1940–1956	Flag of the emir of Kuwait	
	1921–1940	Flag of the emir of Kuwait	

== Military flag ==
Flag	Date	Use	Description
	1967–present	Flag of the Kuwait National Guard	A horizontal bicolour of green and yellow with the National Guard emblem in the center.

== Municipality flag ==
Flag	Date	Use	Description
	?–present	Flag of Kuwait City	A white field with the emblem of the city in the center.

== Historical flags ==
=== Under pre-Islamic Persia ===
Flag	Date	Use	Description
	559–529 BC	Standard of the Achaemenid Empire	Also called Derafsh Sahbaz, it was the standard of Cyrus the Great, founder of the Achaemenid Empire.
	224–632	Standard of the Sasanian Empire	Also known as the Derafsh Kaviani, it was the mythological and historical flag of Iran until the end of the Sassanid dynasty, which according to Ferdowsi's narration in the Shahnameh, emerged with the uprising of Kaveh the Blacksmith against the tyrannical king Zahak and the beginning of Fereydon's kingdom and the Pishdadian dynasty.

=== Under Arab rule ===
Flag	Date	Use	Description
	750–945	Flag of the Abbasid Caliphate	A simple black field.

=== Under the Buyid dynasty ===
Flag	Date	Use	Description
	945–1055	Flag of the Buyid dynasty	

=== Under Mongol rule ===
Flag	Date	Use	Description
	1258–1432	Flag of the Ilkhanate and the Jalayirid Sultanate	A scarlet square on a golden field.

=== Aq Qoyunlu ===
Flag	Date	Use	Description
	1452–1478	Flag of Aq Qoyunlu from the period of Uzun Hasan's reign	

=== Timurid Empire ===
Flag	Date	Use	Description
	1384–1405	Flag of the Timurid Empire	
	1405–1502	Flag of the Timurid Empire	

=== Under Portuguese rule ===
Flag	Date	Use	Description
	1521–1533	Flag of the Kingdom of Portugal	White field with the royal coat of arms in the middle.

=== Safavid dynasty ===
Flag	Date	Use	Description
	1502–1524	Flag of Safavid Iran	
	1524–1533; 1623–1638	Flag of Safavid Iran	

=== Omani Empire ===
Flag	Date	Use	Description
	1670–1716	Flag of the Imamate of Oman	A white field with the royal emblem in the canton.
	1696–1716	Flag of the Omani Empire	A white field with a red sword and red Arabic script below.

=== Ottoman Empire ===
Flag	Date	Use	Description
	1533–1623; 1638–1793	Flag of the Ottoman Empire	
	1793–1844	Flag of the Ottoman Empire	A red field with a white crescent moon and an eight-pointed star.
	1844–1914	Flag of the Ottoman Empire	A red field with a white crescent moon and a five-pointed star.
Ottoman Kuwait
	1746–1871	Al-Sulami flag	
	1746–1871	Al-Sulami flag (variant)	
	1903	Diplomatic flag during the visit of Lord Curzon	

=== Under British rule ===
Flag	Date	Use	Description
	1914–1961	Flag of the United Kingdom	A superimposition of the flags of England and Scotland with the Saint Patrick's Saltire (representing Ireland).
	1914–1947	Flag of British India	A Red Ensign with the Union Jack at the canton, defaced with the Star of India displayed in the fly.
British Kuwait
	1914–1921	Flag of British Kuwait	
	1921–1940	Flag of British Kuwait	
	1940–1961	Flag of British Kuwait	
Military Flags
	1920	Battle flag raised during Battle of Jahra in 1920	
	1956–1961	Maritime ensign of Kuwait	

== Proposed flags ==
Flag	Date	Use	Description
	1906	Proposed flag for Kuwait	
	1909–1915	Proposed flag for Kuwait	

== See also ==
- Flag of Kuwait
- Emblem of Kuwait
