= List of Saudi Arabian flags =

List of flags of Saudi Arabia

The following is a list of flags used in Saudi Arabia. For more information about the national flag, see the Flag of Saudi Arabia.

== National flag ==
Flag	Date	Use	Description
	1973–present	Flag of Saudi Arabia	A green field with the Shahada written in the Thuluth script in white above a horizontal sword whose tip points to the left.

== Royal flags ==
Flag	Date	Use	Description
	1973–present	Royal flag of the King of Saudi Arabia. (Ratio: 2:3)	A green field with the Shahada written in the Thuluth script in white above a horizontal sword whose tip points to the left, with the golden royal emblem on the lower hoist corner.
	1973–present	Royal standard of the King of Saudi Arabia. (Ratio: 1:1)	A green field with the golden royal emblem in the center.
	1973–present	Royal flag of the Crown Prince of Saudi Arabia. (Ratio: 2:3)	A green field with the Shahada written in the Thuluth script in white above a horizontal sword whose tip points to the left, with the white royal emblem on the lower hoist corner.
	1973–present	Royal standard of the Crown Prince of Saudi Arabia. (Ratio: 1:1)	A green field with the silver royal emblem in the center.
	1964–1973	Royal flag of the King of Saudi Arabia. (Ratio: 2:3)	A green field with the Shahada written in the Thuluth script in white above two crossed swords, with a golden leaf border (or orle).
	1964–1973	Royal standard of the King of Saudi Arabia. (Ratio: 1:1)	A green field with the royal emblem in the center and a golden leaf border (or orle).
	1953–1964	Royal flag of the King of Saudi Arabia. (Ratio: 2:3)	A green field with the Shahada written in the Thuluth script in white above two crossed swords.
	1953–1964	Royal standard of the King of Saudi Arabia. (Ratio: 1:1)	A green field with the Shahada written in the Thuluth script in white above two crossed swords.
	1938–1953	Royal flag of the King of Saudi Arabia. (Ratio: 2:3)	A green field with the Shahada written in the Thuluth script in white above two crossed swords.
	1938–1953	Royal standard of the King of Saudi Arabia. (Ratio: 1:1)	A green field with the Shahada written in the Thuluth script in white above two crossed swords.
	1938–1953	Royal banner of the King of Saudi Arabia. (Ratio: 12:25)	A green field with the Shahada written in the Thuluth script in white above two crossed swords, and a fly separated into four tongues.

== Ministry flag ==
Flag	Date	Use	Description
	1926–present	Flag of the Ministry of Interior	

== Military flags ==
Flag	Date	Use	Description
	1973–present	Civil ensign of Saudi Arabia (obverse)	
	1973–present	Civil ensign of Saudi Arabia (reverse)	
	1973–present	Flag of the Royal Saudi Arabian Army	
	1973–present	War flag of the Royal Saudi Arabian Army	
	1973–present	Flag of the Airborne Units and Special Security Forces Command	
	1973–present	Flag of the Airborne Units and Special Security Forces	
	1973–present	Flag of the Saudi Artillery Corps	
	1973–present	Flag of the Saudi Armored Corps Command	
	1973–present	Flag of the Saudi Armored Corps	
	1920–present	Flag of the Royal Saudi Air Force (with seal)	
	1920–present	Air Force ensign of Saudi Arabia	
	1960–present	Flag of the Royal Saudi Navy	
	1960–present	Naval ensign of the Royal Saudi Navy	
	1973–present	Flag of the Royal Saudi Air Defense Forces	
	1973–present	Flag of the Saudi Special Security Forces	

== Historical flags ==
Flag	Date	Use	Description
	1744–1818	Flag of the Emirate of Diriyah	A green field with a white stripe on the fly and white Arabic text in the center.
	1822–1891	Flag of the Emirate of Nejd	A green field with a white stripe on the fly and white Arabic text in the center.
	1902–1913	Flag of the Emirate of Riyadh	A green field with a white stripe on the fly and white Arabic text in the center.
	1835–1921	Flag of the Emirate of Jabal Shammar	A red field with a large golden crescent moon and an eight-pointed star.
	1909–1927	Flag of the Idrisid Emirate of Asir	A green field with a white spiked border and white Arabic text in the center.
	1913–1921	Flag of the Emirate of Nejd and Hasa	A green field with a white stripe on the fly, white Arabic text in the center, and two crossed swords.
	1916–1917	Provisional flag of the Kingdom of Hejaz	A simple red field.
	1916–1920	Flag of the Sheikdom of Upper Asir	A white field with a blue crescent moon in the canton and blue Arabic text in the center.
	1917–1920	Flag of the Kingdom of Hejaz	A horizontal triband of black, green, and white, with a red isosceles triangle based on the hoist side.
	1920–1926	Flag of the Kingdom of Hejaz	A horizontal triband of black, white, and green, with a red isosceles triangle based on the hoist side.
	1924–1925	Flag of the Sharifian Caliphate	A horizontal triband of black, white, and green, with a red isosceles triangle based on the hoist side.
	1921–1926	Flag of the Sultanate of Nejd	A green field with a white stripe on the fly, white Arabic text in the center and a horizontal sword, having its tip pointed to the left.
	1926–1932	Flag of Nejd as part of the Kingdom of Hejaz and Nejd	A green field with a white stripe on the fly, white Arabic text in the center above a horizontal sword, having its tip pointed to the left and above more Arabic text.
	1927–1930	Flag of the Idrisid Emirate of Asir	A green field with white Arabic text in the center.
	1932–1934	Flag of Saudi Arabia	A green field with a white stripe on the fly and the Shahada above a sword in the center.
	1934–1938	Flag of Saudi Arabia	A green field with a narrow white stripe on the fly and the Shahada above a sword in the center.
	1938–1973	Flag of Saudi Arabia	A green field with the Shahada above a sword in the center.

== See also ==
- Flag of Saudi Arabia
- Emblem of Saudi Arabia
