= List of Bahraini flags =

The following is a list of flags, banners and standards used in Bahrain.

== National flag ==
Flag	Date	Use	Description
	2002–present	Flag of Bahrain	Red with a white band at the hoist. The division between the two colors is a zigzag with five white points.
	2002–present	Flag of Bahrain (vertical)	

== Royal flag ==
Flag	Date	Use	Description
	2002–present	Royal flag of Bahrain	Similar to the national flag but with two narrow white stripes along the top and bottom edges and a golden crown placed in the canton.

== Military flags ==
Flag	Date	Use	Description
	1968–present	Flag of the Bahrain Defence Force	A green field with the national flag in the canton defaced with the emblem of the defence force.
	1979–present	Flag of the Royal Bahrain Naval Force	A blue field with the emblem of the royal naval force in the center.
	1977–present	Flag of the Royal Bahraini Air Force	A grey field with the emblem of the royal air force in the center.
	1969–present	Flag of the Royal Bahraini Army	A green field with the national flag in the canton defaced with the emblem of the royal army.
	1968–present	Flag of the Royal Guard of Bahrain	A red field with a green triangle emerging from the upper edge, the emblem of the royal guard in the center, and Arabic text below.
	1968–present	Flag of the Bahrain Defence Force's Royal Medical Services	A dark red field with the emblem of the royal medical services in the center.
	1997–present	Flag of the National Guard of Bahrain	A green field with the emblem of the national guard in the center.

== Governorate flags ==
Flag	Date	Use	Description
	2002–present	Flag of the Capital Governorate	A white field with the emblem of the Capital Governorate in the center.
	2002–present	Flag of the Muharraq Governorate	A white field with the emblem of the Muharraq Governorate in the center.
	2002–present	Flag of the Southern Governorate	A white field with the emblem of the Southern Governorate in the center.
	2002–present	Flag of the Northern Governorate	A white field with the emblem of the Northern Governorate in the center.
	2002–2014	Flag of the Central Governorate	A white field with the emblem of the Central Governorate in the center.

== Historical flags ==
=== Under Persian rule ===
Flag	Date	Use	Description
Pre-Islamic Persia
	559–529 BC	Standard of the Achaemenid Empire	Also called Derafsh Sahbaz, it was the standard of Cyrus the Great, founder of the Achaemenid Empire.
	225–651	Flag of the Sasanian Empire	Called Derafsh Kaviani, it is the mythological and historical flag of Iran until the end of the Sassanid dynasty, which according to Ferdowsi's narration in the Shahnameh, this flag emerged with the uprising of Kaveh the Blacksmith against the tyrannical king Zahak and the beginning of Fereydon's kingdom and the Pishdadian dynasty.
Islamic Persia
	945–1055	Banner of the Buyid dynasty	Four green sulde suspended on a staff.
	1258–1432	Flag of the Ilkhanate	A scarlet square on a golden field.
	1384–1405	Flag of the Timurid Empire	
	1405–1502	Flag of the Timurid Empire	
	1502–1521	Flag of the Safavid dynasty	
	1602–1736	Flag of the Safavid dynasty	
	1736–1747	Standard of Nader Shah	
	1747–1751	Flag of the Afsharid dynasty	
	1751–1783	Flag of the Zand dynasty	

=== Under Arab rule ===
Flag	Date	Use	Description
Caliphates
	651–661; 750–934	Flag of the Rashidun and Abbasid Caliphates	A simple black field.
	661–750	Flag of the Umayyad Caliphate	A simple white field.
Emirates
	1417–1520	Flag of the Jabrids Emirate	A red field with a white symbol in the center and white Arabic text above.
	1727–1818; 1822–1891	Flag of the Emirate of Diriyah and the Emirate of Nejd	A green field with a vertical white band at the hoist and Arabic text written in white in the center.

=== Under Portuguese rule ===
Flag	Date	Use	Description
Kingdom of Portugal
	1508–1521	Flag of the Kingdom of Portugal	White field with the royal coat of arms in the middle.
	1521–1578	Flag of the Kingdom of Portugal	White field with the royal coat of arms in the middle.
	1578–1640	Flag of the Kingdom of Portugal	White field with the royal coat of arms in the middle.
	1616–1640	Flag of the Kingdom of Portugal (putative)	White field with the royal coat of arms in the middle.
	1640–1650	Flag of the Kingdom of Portugal	White field with the royal coat of arms in the middle.
Iberian Union
	1580–1640	Flag of the Iberian Union	A red saltire resembling two crossed, roughly pruned (knotted) branches, on a white field.
	1580–1640	Banner of arms of the Iberian Union	The heraldry of the House of Austria (with the arms of Portugal).
	1580–1640	Royal flag of the Iberian Union	A red field with the royal arms in the center.

=== Under Omani rule ===
Flag	Date	Use	Description
	1670–1783	Flag of the Imamate of Oman	A white field with the royal emblem in the canton.
	1696–1783	Flag of the Omani Empire	A white field with a red sword and red Arabic script below.

=== Independent Bahrain ===
Flag	Date	Use	Description
Pre-British rule
	1783–1820	Flag of Bahrain	A simple red field.
	1820–1861	Flag of Bahrain	A red field with a white band at the hoist.
Post-British rule
	1971–1972	Flag of Bahrain	A red field with a white band at the hoist. The division between the two colors is a zigzag with 28 red points.
	1972–2002	Flag of Bahrain	Red with a white band at the hoist. The division between the two colors is a zigzag with eight white points.

=== Under British rule ===
Flag	Date	Use	Description
	1861–1971	Flag of the United Kingdom	A superimposition of the flags of England and Scotland with the Saint Patrick's Saltire (representing Ireland).
	1880–1947	Flag of British India	A Red Ensign with the Union Jack at the canton, defaced with the Star of India emblem displayed in the fly.
	1968–1971	Flag of the Council of Trucial Oman	A horizontal triband of red, white, and red with a green seven-pointed star in the center.
	1861–1932	Flag of Bahrain	A red field with a white band at the hoist.
	1932–1971	Flag of Bahrain	A red field with a white band at the hoist. The division between the two colors is a zigzag with 28 red points.

== See also ==
- Flag of Bahrain
- Coat of arms of Bahrain
