= List of Maldivian flags =

This is a list of flags used in the Maldives. For more information about the national flag, see flag of Maldives.

== National flag ==
| Flag | Date | Use | Description |
|---|---|---|---|
| | 1965–present | Flag of Maldives | A green rectangle centered on a red field, charged with a white crescent facing the fly side |

== Governmental flag ==
| Flag | Date | Use | Description |
|---|---|---|---|
| | 1968–present | Flag of the president of the Maldives | A green rectangle centered on a red field, charged with a white crescent and a five-pointed star facing the fly side |

== Military flags ==
| Flag | Date | Use | Description |
|---|---|---|---|
| | 1988–present | Flag of the Maldives National Defence Force | A horizontal bicolour of white and black with the emblem of the MNDF in the center |
| | 1988–present | Flag of the MNDF Marine Corps | A red field with the golden emblem of the Marine Corps in the center and the flag of the MNDF on the canton |

== Historical flags ==
| Flag | Date | Use | Description |
|---|---|---|---|
| | 1117–1400 | First flag of the Kingdom of Maldives | A double pennant; two black triangles based at the hoist with red and white borders above and below each triangle |
| | 1400–1558; 1573–1757; 1759–1766; 1773–1796 | Second flag of the Kingdom of Maldives | A double pennant; two overlapping red triangles |
| | 1645–1757; 1759–1766; 1773–1795 | The Prince's Flag | A horizontal tricolour of orange, white, and blue |
| | 1652–1672 | States Flag | A horizontal tricolour of red, white, and blue |
| | 1796–1903 | Third flag of the Kingdom of Maldives | A simple red field |
| | 1903–1926 | Fourth flag of the Kingdom of Maldives | A red field with a black and white hoist |
| | 1926–1953 | Final and national flag of the Kingdom of Maldives | A red field with a black and white hoist and a white crescent moon facing the hoist side |
| | 1926–1953 | State flag of the Kingdom of Maldives | A green rectangle centered on a red field with a black and white hoist, charged with a white crescent facing the hoist side |
| | 1953–1965 | First flag of the Republic of Maldives | A green rectangle centered on a red field with a black and white hoist, charged with a white crescent facing the fly side |
| | 1926–1952 | Flag of the prime minister of the Maldives | Quarterly divided green–blue–red–green, with a white star in the first quarter |
| | 1959–1963 | Flag of the United Suvadive Republic | A horizontal tricolour of blue, green, and red with a white crescent in the center and three five-pointed stars in each stripe, diagonally aligned from lower hoist to upper fly |

== See also ==
- Flag of Maldives
- Emblem of Maldives
