= List of Bruneian flags =

This is a list of flags used in Brunei. For more information about the national flag, see Flag of Brunei.

== National flags ==
Flag	Use	Type	Description	Flag ratio
	1959–present	National flag of Brunei	A centred red crest of Brunei on a yellow field cut by black and white diagonal stripes (parallelograms).	1:2

== Government ==
Flag	Type	Description	Flag ratio
	Flag of the Royal Brunei Armed Forces	Yellow flag with three diagonal stripes white over red over black, with the Royal Brunei Armed Forces badge in the middle.	2:3
	Flag of the Royal Brunei Land Force	Red ensign with the Bruneian flag in canton and the Royal Brunei Land Force emblem in fly.	1:2
	Flag of the Royal Brunei Navy	White ensign with the Bruneian flag in canton and the Royal Brunei Naval emblem in fly.	1:2
	Flag of the Royal Brunei Air Force	Light blue ensign with the Bruneian flag in canton and the Royal Brunei Air Force emblem in fly.	1:2
	Flag of the Royal Brunei Police Force	Dark blue flag with the emblem in the centre.	1:2

== Royal standards ==
=== Royal family ===
Flag	Use	Description	Flag ratio
	Standard of the Sultan of Brunei	The standard of His Majesty the Sultan is yellow, incorporating his personal emblem at the centre of the standard with all its elements red.	1:2
	Standard of the non-gahara child of the Sultan of Brunei		1:2
	Standard of the gahara grandchild of the Sultan of Brunei		1:2
	Standard of the non-gahara grandchild of the Sultan of Brunei		1:2
	Standard of the piut grandchild of the Sultan of Brunei		1:2
	Standard of the antah grandchild of the Sultan of Brunei		1:2

=== Duli-Duli Wazir ===
Flag	Use	Description	Flag ratio
	Standard of the Pengiran Perdana Wazir (gahara child of the Sultan of Brunei)	The personal emblem of Pengiran Perdana Wazir of Brunei on a white field.	1:2
	Standard of the Pengiran Bendehara (gahara child of the Sultan of Brunei)	The personal emblem of the gahara children of the Sultan of Brunei on a white field.	1:2
	Standard of the Pengiran Bendehara (non-gahara child of the Sultan of Brunei)	A centred red crest of Brunei on a white field.	1:2
	Standard of the Pengiran Di-Gadong (gahara child of the Sultan of Brunei)	The personal emblem of the gahara children of the Sultan of Brunei on a green field.	1:2
	Standard of the Pengiran Di-Gadong (non-gahara child of the Sultan of Brunei)	A centred red crest of Brunei on a green field.	1:2
	Standard of the Pengiran Pemancha (gahara child of the Sultan of Brunei)	The personal emblem of the gahara children of the Sultan of Brunei on a black field.	1:2
	Standard of the Pengiran Pemancha (non-gahara child of the Sultan of Brunei)	A centred red crest of Brunei on a black field.	1:2
	Standard of the Pengiran Temenggong (gahara child of the Sultan of Brunei)	The personal emblem of the gahara children of the Sultan of Brunei on a red field.	1:2
	Standard of the Pengiran Temenggong (non-gahara child of the Sultan of Brunei)	A centred yellow crest of Brunei on a red field.	1:2

=== Pengiran-Pengiran Cheteria ===
Flag	Use	Description	Flag ratio
	Standard of the Pengiran Perdana Cheteria Laila Diraja Sahibun Nabalah		1:2
	Standard of the Pengiran Lela Cheteria Sahibun Najabah		1:2
	Standard of the Pengiran Maharaja Lela Sahibul Kahar		1:2
	Standard of the Pengiran Indera Setia Diraja Sahibul Karib and Pengiran Maharaja Setia Laila Diraja Sahibul Irshad		1:2
	Standard of the Pengiran Pekerma Setia Diraja Sahibul Bandar		1:2
	Standard of the Pengiran Sanggamara Diraja		1:2
	Standard of the Cheteria Besar (Cheteria Lapan)		1:2
	Standard of the Cheteria Pengalasan (Cheteria Enam Belas)		1:2
	Standard of the Pengiran Penggawa Laila Bentara Istiadat Diraja Dalam Istana		1:2
	Standard of the Cheteria Damit (Cheteria Tiga Puluh Dua)		1:2

=== Descendants of Cheteria ===
Flag	Use	Description	Flag ratio
	Standard of the Pengiran-Pengiran Kebanyakan		1:2

=== Pehin-Pehin Manteri ===
Flag	Use	Description	Flag ratio
	Standard of the Pehin Datu Perdana Manteri		1:2
	Standard of the Kepala Manteri 4 and Manteri Tambahan Di-Atas Manteri 4		1:2
	Standard of the Pehin Orang Kaya Penggawa Laila Bentara Diraja		1:2
	Standard of the Pehin Sanggamara Asgar Diraja		1:2
	Standard of the Manteri Empat		1:2
	Standard of the Pehin-Pehin Manteri and Pehin-Pehin Manteri Tambahan		1:2
	Standard of the Pehin Orang Kaya Perbendaharaan Diraja		1:2
	Standard of the Pehin Datu Seri Maharaja		1:2
	Standard of the Pehin Datu Imam		1:2
	Standard of the Begawan Pehin Datu Imam		1:2
	Standard of the Pehin Siraja Khatib		1:2
	Standard of the Begawan Pehin Siraja Khatib		1:2
	Standard of the Pehin Tuan Imam		1:2
	Standard of the Begawan Pehin Tuan Imam		1:2
	Standard of the Pehin Udana Khatib		1:2
	Standard of the Begawan Pehin Udana Khatib		1:2
	Standard of the Pehin Khatib		1:2
	Standard of the Begawan Pehin Khatib		1:2

=== Manteri Hulubalang and Manteri Darat ===
Flag	Use	Description	Flag ratio
	Standard of the Manteri Hulubalang		1:2
	Standard of the Kepala Manteri Darat		1:2
	Standard of the Manteri Darat		1:2
	Standard of the Mudim		1:2
	Standard of the Begawan Mudim		1:2

== Historical flags ==
Flag	Date	Use	Description	Flag ratio
	1352–1368	Flag of the Majapahit Empire	Thirteen horizontal stripes alternating red and white.	
	1368–1906	Flag of the Bruneian Sultanate	A simple yellow field.	1:2
	Until 1888	A flag of the Bruneian navy	The swallowtail variant of the flag of the Bruneian Sultanate.	
	Until 1906	A flag of the Bruneian navy	The pennant variant of the flag of the Bruneian Sultanate. Most commonly used by irregular war praus	
	Until 1888	A likely flag of the Bruneian army	Quartered diagonally, with yellow triangles on top and bottom and red triangles at the hoist and fly.	
	1906–1959	Flag of the Protectorate of Brunei	A yellow field cut by black and white diagonal stripes (parallelograms).	1:2

== See also ==
- Flag of Brunei
- Emblem of Brunei
