= List of East Timorese flags =

== National flag ==
Flag	Date	Use	Description
	1975 (de facto); 2002-present (de jure)	Flag of Timor-Leste	A red field with the black isosceles triangle based on the hoist-side bearing a white five-pointed star in the center superimposed on the larger yellow triangle, also based on the hoist-side, that extends to the center of the flag.

== Military flags ==
Flag	Date	Use	Description
		Flag of the Timor-Leste Defence Force	

== Historical flags ==
Flag	Date	Use	Description
	1999–2002	The Flag of the United Nations, used by East Timor under UN administration	
	1976–1999	Provincial flag of Timor Timur	
	1975–1999	Flag of Indonesia used by the Provisional Government of East Timor (1975–1976) during the Indonesian invasion and in Timor Timur province during the subsequent Indonesian occupation	
	28 November 1975 – 7 December 1975	Flag used following unilateral declaration of independence	
	1965	1965 proposal for a flag of Portuguese Timor (never adopted)	
	1942–1945	Flag of Japan used in during Japan's occupation of Portuguese Timor	
	1946	Flag of Timor's Portuguese refugees flown in Lisbon after the occupation (1946)	
	1932	1932 proposal for a flag of Portuguese Timor (never adopted)	
	1910–1975	The flag of Portugal, adopted in 1910, was used in Portuguese Timor	
	1830–1910	The national flag of Portugal, was used in Portuguese Timor	
	1816–1830	The flag of Portugal, was used in Portuguese Timor	
	1750–1816	The flag of Portugal, as adopted in 1750, was used in Portuguese Timor	
	1707–1750	The flag of Portugal, as adopted in 1707, was used in Portuguese Timor	
	1702–1707	The flag of Portugal, as adopted in 1667, was used in Portuguese Timor	
	1652–1702	The State's Flag	
	1602–1702	The Prince's Flag	
	1293–1527	The flag of The Majapahit Empire	
Other
	1999–2000	Flag of the Aitarak	An upside-down flag of Indonesia with the lettering "AITARAK" (Tetum for thorn). This modification of the flag is illegal and is a punishable offense in Indonesia.
	1986-2001	Flag of the National Council of Maubere Resistance (obverse and reverse)	

== Political flags ==
Flag	Date	Use	Description
		Flag of Aliansa Demokratika AD	The Democratic Alliance (Tetum: Aliansa Demokratika, Portuguese: Aliança Democrática) is an electoral alliance of Klibur Oan Timor Asuwain (KOTA) and People's Party of Timor (PPT) that ran with a joint list in the 2007 general election. The flag was also used alone by the KOTA after the end of the alliance. Black represents the darkness, white the light. There is a movement out of the dark into the light. Eight is a magical number for both Hindus and Buddhists. In algebra, it symbolizes infinity. The one shows that the KOTA members only believe in one God.
		Flag of Timorese People's Monarchist Association	Like the KOTA, from which the APMT split, the APMT uses a vertically divided, black-and-white party flag, albeit with no other symbols.
		Flag of Timorese Social Democratic Association	The white triangle on the flag is inspired by the national flag of Timor-Leste. In the centre of the triangle is a red disc. The rest of the flag consists of three horizontal stripes green, yellow, blue, with the yellow stripe only half as wide as the other two. On the yellow stripe, "ASDT" is written in black letters.
	2015	Flag of Bloku Unidade Popular	The flag of the BUP was a red-green-red horizontally tripartite flag, with the party name in the green stripe and a yellow star in the top red stripe. Lined up along the leech are the flags of the parties that were part of this alliance. In 2016 the PST left and in 2017 the PARENTIL left, which is why the flag had to be updated and now only contained the flags of PDRT, PMD and PLPA until the alliance collapsed in 2018.
	2016	Flag of Bloku Unidade Popular	The flag of the BUP was a red-green-red horizontally tripartite flag, with the party name in the green stripe and a yellow star in the top red stripe. Lined up along the leech are the flags of the parties that were part of this alliance. In 2016 the PST left and in 2017 the PARENTIL left, which is why the flag had to be updated and now only contained the flags of PDRT, PMD and PLPA until the alliance collapsed in 2018.
	2017	Flag of Bloku Unidade Popular	The flag of the BUP was a red-green-red horizontally tripartite flag, with the party name in the green stripe and a yellow star in the top red stripe. Lined up along the leech are the flags of the parties that were part of this alliance. In 2016 the PST left and in 2017 the PARENTIL left, which is why the flag had to be updated and now only contained the flags of PDRT, PMD and PLPA until the alliance collapsed in 2018.
		Flag of Timorese Social Democratic Action Center	The symbol of Timorese Social Democratic Action Center (CASDT) aims at dynamism and progress, that people move forward to a better future and a harmonious life. It also symbolises the basic quality required: activities, discipline and meetings. The Nabilan plaque symbolises the prosperity that will be distributed among the 13 communities of Timor-Leste. The white triangle represents the purity of spirit, the love of peace and the in three basic principles of the party: justice, unity and solidarity. Yellow symbolises the dynamism and creativity of the Timorese people who, spurred on, have actively participated in the struggle for independence and are now fighting for progress. Blue demonstrates the confidence and trust of free, independent and harmonious peoples living socially together in the world.
		Flag of National Congress for Timorese Reconstruction	Both the colour scheme and the name abbreviation are derived from the National Council of Maubere Resistance, the Timorese umbrella organisation of resistance against the Indonesian occupation.
		Flag of Frenti Dezenvolvimentu Demokratiku	The FDD was an alliance of PUDD, UDT, Frenti-Mudança and PDN. The FDD flag shows the four party flags, together with an Ai To'os and three different Uma Lulik.
		Flag of Fretilin	The flag of the FRETILIN served as a model for the national flag of Timor-Leste, which is partly criticised nowadays. Red and the five-pointed star are common socialist symbols.
	2011	Flag of Frenti-Mudança	Fretilin-Mudança is a split from Fretilin, which is also reflected in the design of the party flag. In August 2011, the party renamed itself Frenti-Mudança. The flag was also redesigned. Some versions of the new party flag lack the black stripes. Green represents the young generation of the country and the importance of nature and environmental protection, including respect for nature and traditional culture. The star shines through all people and paves the way forward for gender equality. Justice and equality for all people. The black commemorates the heroes who died in the struggle for independence. Yellow represents prosperity and economic independence for the people. Red represents courage to defend justice and fight injustice, crime, and corruption.
	August 2011	Flag of Frenti-Mudança	
		Flag of Association of Timorese Heroes	The new flag of KOTA includes in the logo a Timorese house in traditional design, two suriks (Timorese swords) and a kaibauk (Timorese crown). The old flag of KOTA consisted of eight stripes (black, yellow, red, green, white, blue, red, green) that draw an arc to the upper right corner where the stripes taper to a point. The black stripe contained a yellow 32-rayed sun on the left and the lettering KOTA in white. In the centre was a white disc surrounded by a blue ring. Around the ring was the complete name of the party. On the ring were 33 yellow stars. On the white disc, from top to bottom, were a house of traditional construction, two crossed suriks and a kaibauk. Besides the party flag, KOTA also flies a black flag, which is supposed to represent Timorese culture.
		Flag of Kmanek Haburas Unidade Nasional Timor Oan	
		Flag of Freedom Movement for the Maubere people	
		Flag of Democratic Party of Maurebe	Using a pattern similar to the Fretilin flag, with a blue stripe at the hoist and the rest covered by three horizontal stripes red, yellow, green. Centered on the blue stripe a golden sun with 32 rays (like in the flag of KOTA), and, at the bottom, the lettering "PDM" in dark blue, light blue rimmed, dark red drop shadowed sans capitals.
	2001	Flag of Democratic Liberal Party	In 2001, the flag consisted of a blue triangle on a white background. On the blue background was a white dove with a banner ending in a five-pointed white star. On the banner was the word Liberal. in the 2001 version, the dove was drawn in more detail and on the sides of the triangle were the three parts of the party motto "Relijaun (religion), Kultura (culture), Liberdade (freedom)" on tetum.
	2007	Flag of Democratic Liberal Party	In 2007, the flag was redesigned in anticipation of the 2007 parliamentary elections. The 3 motos on each side of the flag was removed and the dove was then simplified. The party is now called Partidu Democrática Liberal.
		Flag of Democratic Party	The central element of the party logo is a wooden ballot box. The party motto is shown in tetum.
	2000	Flag of Christian Democratic Party	The first party flag consisted of a brown cross on a yellow disc surrounded by the party motto in Indonesian "Memperjuangkan nilai-nilai Kekristenam" and the name abbreviation "PDC".
	2007	Flag of Christian Democratic Party	In 2007, the flag was redesigned in anticipation of the 2007 parliamentary elections. The flag's main symbol in the centre was a white peace dove in a star-shaped, red-rimmed cross on a yellow disc.
	2016	Flag of Christian Democratic Party	Since 2016, the PDC has had a new party flag with 15 stars in the canton. Three horizontal stripes in black-yellow-red are covered with the new party logo.
		Flag of Party of National Development	A 2:3 horizontal triband of pale blue and white with a logo in the middle and party name in thin white sans serif upper case letters on the lower stripe. The logo shows three green mountain peaks against a large deep yellow sun disc, charged with the letters "PND" in dark blue with white shadow, all resting on a dark blue scroll. Sometimes also the scroll bears an inscription set in white sans serif upper case letters.
		Flag of People's Party of Development	The PDP's flag is a horizontal tricolour in blue, white and yellow. In the centre is the party abbreviation PDP and above it in the blue stripe a mountain range.
		Flag of Democratic Republic of Timor-Leste Party	Stripes of different colours form the base of the flag. The white triangle on the left is inspired by the national flag of Timor-Leste. Besides three yellow stars and a red sun, the party logo is found here: a blue disc with a white Christian cross and a crescent-shaped kaibauk (Timorese crown).
		Flag of Hope of the Fatherland Party	The flag of the party, founded in 2017, is divided vertically into three fields of green-white-green. In the white field, a white and a brown hand shake between the party abbreviation and the party name.
		Flag of Millennium Democratic Party	Central elements of the logo are a globe framed by 27 yellow rays, a white dove with a scale in its beak and the white map of Timor-Leste.
		Flag of Timorese Nationalist Party	The flag of the PNT is a mixture of the flag of Timor-Leste with the colors of the "brother peoples" Portugal and Indonesia by combining the Portuguese green and red with the Indonesian red and white. The "brotherly solidarity" of the peoples is symbolized by the five-pointed white star.
		Flag of People's Party of Timor	The base of the flag consists of two horizontal stripes, light blue at the top and white at the bottom. In the centre is the party coat of arms: A silver shield, vertically divided into two. On the left a golden belak, on the right two crossed daggers. On the dividing line, slightly offset downwards, the Portuguese coat of arms. On the coat of arms is a kaibauk (Timorese crown). The shield bears two purple roosters with red combs, silver tail feathers and golden legs. Below a golden banner with the inscription "Timor-Dili".
		Flag of Timor-Leste National Republic Party	In its flag, the PARENTIL displays six stars in a black stripe at the leech and ten other coloured horizontal stripes.
		Flag of Social Democratic Party	The PSD chose orange as the primary color of its flag, taking its Portuguese sister party of the same name as a model. The same applies to the arrows in the center of the logo. The combination of the map of Timor-Leste and a crocodile alludes to the creation story of Timor-Leste. The motto in Portuguese means Solidarity, Equality, Freedom .
	2000	Flag of Socialist Party of Timor	Socialist Party of Timor: green flag with a circular badge centered. The symbol in the flag is a simplified version of the complete symbol, which consists of a white seal with "UNIDADE ACÇÃO PROGRESSO E IGUALDADE" and "PST" in an outer arc and "PARTIDO SOCIALISTA DE TIMOR" in an inner arc and a hexagon in the center, red with a golden star, a closed fist, a pen and a spear.
	2007	Flag of Socialist Party of Timor	In anticipation for the next parliamentary elections, the previous green flag background has been changed to red sometime between 2001 and 2007. The red of the flag is typical of socialist parties; the raised fist, the gavel and the five-pointed star are also socialist symbols. The arrow is a Timorese symbol. The party motto in Portuguese is Unity, Sharing, Progress and Equality. The previous flag had a green base colour with the party logo and motto on a white disc.
	2012	Flag of Socialist Party of Timor	In anticipation of the 2012 parliamentary elections. The flag had been redesigned to a ~1:2 red flag with a black hoist stripe (width approx. 1/8 of the flag) with a yellow party emblem on the red area, shifted to the hoist, and white lettering (set in white sans serif upper case letters) spelling large "PST" on the hoist stripe, vertically with each letter pointing down, and the party name on the red area, on one line middle to fly. The emblem is quite different from the previous, showing three (five-pointed upright regular) stars set in an equilateral triangle, two of them on a vertical axis and the third off to the fly, enclosing a hammer over what seems to be an eclipsed sun in the style of a gear.
		Flag of Timorese Democratic Party	The flag of the PTD is based on the flag of the PNT.
		Flag of National Unity Party	The 13 stars correspond to the 13 parishes of Timor-Leste. The stars reproduce the map of East Timor according to the position of the parishes in the country.
		Flag of Liberal Party	
		Flag of People's Freedom Party of the Aileba	Black triangle and star are from the national flag of Timor-Leste. The national flag's yellow triangle and red field are replaced with a horizontal tricolor of green, red, and yellow. The abbreviation "PLPA" is written in black letters in the red stripe.
		Flag of People's Liberation Party	The flag of the party founded in 2015 is divided diagonally in two. Towards the mast it is blue at the top, towards the flying part it is green at the bottom. The party logo is in the center. A circle made up of half a black chain and half a yellow cog wheel. In it on a white background is a photo of a Timor's rainbow lorikeet, above it a yellow star and in the lower part the yellow letters PLP.
		Flag of Republican Party	The flag of the republican party is kept simple. A white base with a green disc with yellow "PR" and the party name in green underneath.
		Flag of Democratic Unity Development Party	
		Flag of Timorese Labor Party	A dark blue flag with circular lettering reading in lower case golden serif "servico ba desenvolvemento" ("service for development") in Tetum. The lower part has its party name in capital "TRABALHISTA" (Portuguese for "Labour"). In side the lettering, a traditional sailing ship, golden, above a map of Timor-Leste, brown, all partially encircled by a branch, with 30 alternating leaves
		Flag of Timorese Democratic Union	In December 1993, the UDT adopted its statute in which the flag is described in Article 4. The symbol of the UDT consists of a kaibauk in the centre, above which are two traditional Timorese sacred houses (Uma Lulik) and four stars in a semicircle. The stars represent the four parts of the country (the main land, the enclave Oe-Cusse Ambeno and the islands Atauro and Jaco). The sacred houses represent the traditional beliefs of the Timorese. One house represents Feto-San (the mother line), one represents Uma-Mane (the father line). Blue represents order and authority, yellow development and progress, green hope for the future, white peace and freedom and red the blood spilled in the struggle for freedom.
		Flag of National Unity of Timorese Resistance	Both the color scheme and the design derive from the Conselho Nacional de Resistência Timorense, the Timorese umbrella organization of the resistance against the Indonesian occupation.
		Flag of Green Party of Timor	The party's logo with the clenched fist is clearly derived from the logo of Partai Solidaritas Indonesia (PSI). On rallies, the logo is placed on a green sheet. Green is the party colour, as the name suggests.

== Municipal flags ==
Flag	Date	Use	Description
		Flag of Baucau	
		Flag of Oecusse	

== See also ==
- Flag of Timor-Leste
- Coat of arms of Timor-Leste
