= Flag of Brunei =

National flag

Brunei Darussalam بروني دارالسلام
- Use: Civil and state flag, civil ensign
- Proportion: 1:2
- Adopted: 29 September 1959; 67 years ago
- Design: A centered red crest of Brunei on a yellow field cut by white and black diagonal stripes (parallelograms).
- Designed by: Pengiran Muhammad Yusuf

The flag of Brunei was originally a solid yellow background until 1906 when it added two diagonal white and black striped lines. At that point, Brunei had been a British protectorate since 1888. The modern flag (including the red emblem) was adopted in 1959 along with their new constitution.

== History ==
With the exception of the symbol, Brunei's current national flag design has been in use since 1906, when the country became a British protectorate under an agreement with the government of the United Kingdom. After the constitution was proclaimed on 29 September 1959, the national emblem was added. Prior to 1906, the sultan and other high-ranking officials, such as wazirs, used their personal standards as Brunei's only flag. The yellow, white, and black colors of the national flag represented the signatories' solidarity in the 1906 pact. Only some people, such as the descendants of sultans and wazirs, were permitted to keep their own banners after 1959 in an effort to decrease the number of flags flown during state occasions.

== Design and symbolism ==
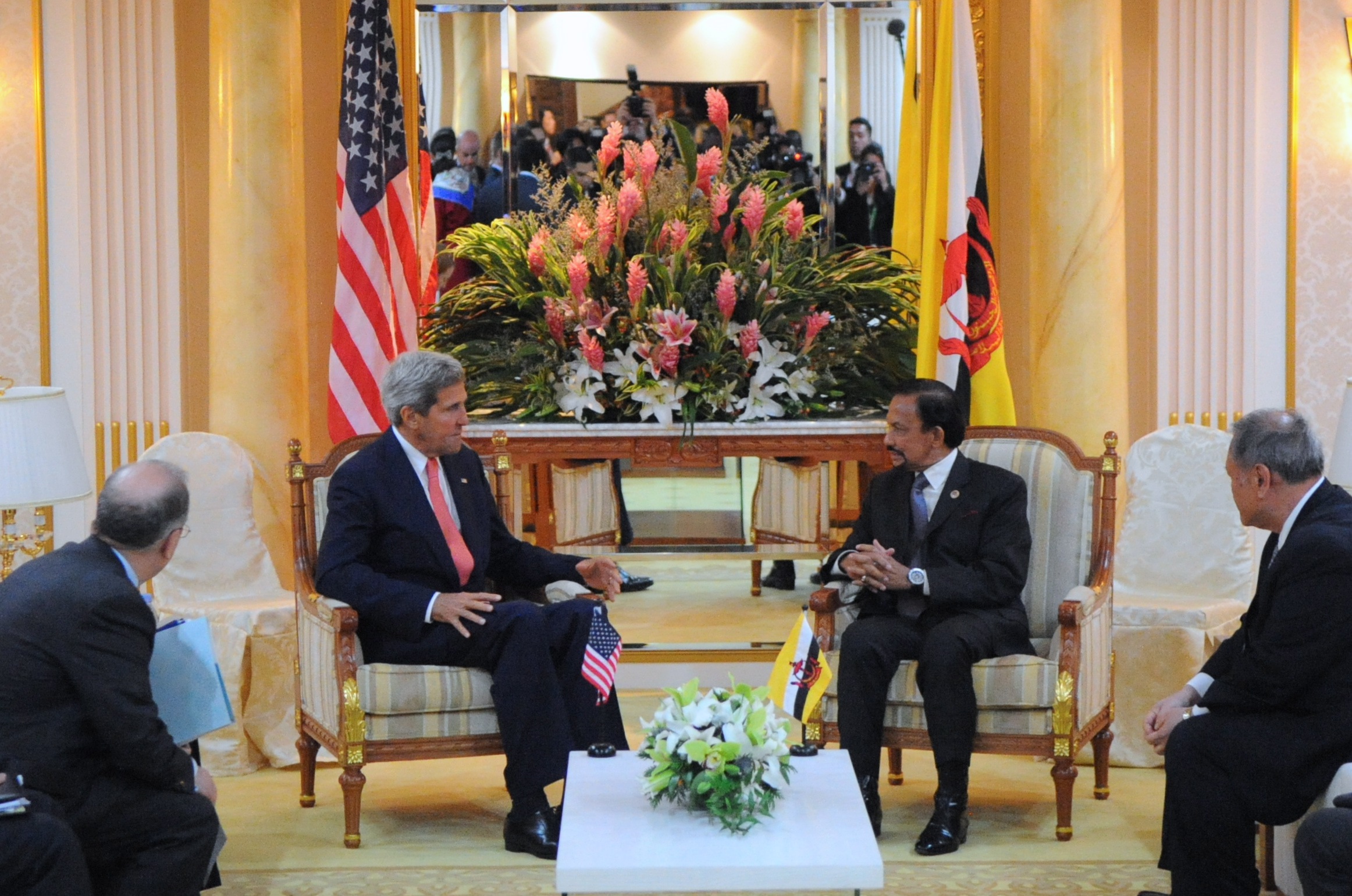
Flag of Brunei behind Sultan Bolkiah in a meeting with John Kerry.

Brunei's national flag is a rectangle design that is 36 inches (910 mm) wide and 72 inches long. A diagonal parallelogram that runs from 2.5 inches below the top left corner to 2.5 inches above the bottom right corner, forming two distinct upper and lower sections, divides it into four sections. This diagonal is further divided into two uneven bands, with the upper white band measuring 7.5 inches wide and being one inch broader than the lower black band.

The red national emblem, with uplifted hands signifying unity and support for the government, sits in the center of the flag. The symbol is 24 inches from the left and right edges, which is the same distance from either side. The national motto, is inscribed on the crescent in the emblem, in yellow Arabic calligraphy: الدائمون المحسنون بالهدى (meaning "Always Render Service with God's Guidance", Malay: "Sentiasa Membuat Kebajikan Dengan Petunjuk Allah"). Below it is the name of the country, بروني دارالسلام, also in Arabic calligraphy.

The flag incorporates four colours:

- Yellow for the background, symbolising the monarchy.
- White for the upper diagonal, representing the wazirs' purity.
- Black for the lower diagonal, indicating strength and determination.
- Red for the emblem, symbolising bravery and unity.

In Southeast Asia, yellow is traditionally the colour of royalty, and the royal standards of Malaysia and Thailand, and the flag of Sarawak, along with the presidential flag of Indonesia, all use a yellow field as well. The crescent symbolises Islam, the parasol symbolises monarchy, and the hands at the side symbolise the benevolence of the government. The black and white stripes represent Brunei's wazirs who were once joint-regents and then – after the sultan came of age – senior advisors: the Pengiran Bendahara (First Minister, symbolised by a slightly thicker white stripe) and the Pengiran Pemancha (Second Minister, governing foreign affairs, symbolised by black), with the white stripe being roughly 12% wider than the black one.

== Colors ==
	Gold	Red	White	Black
RGB	247/224/23	207/17/38	255/255/255	0/0/0
Hexadecimal	#F7E017	#CF1126	#FFFFFF	#000000

=== Construction Sheet ===
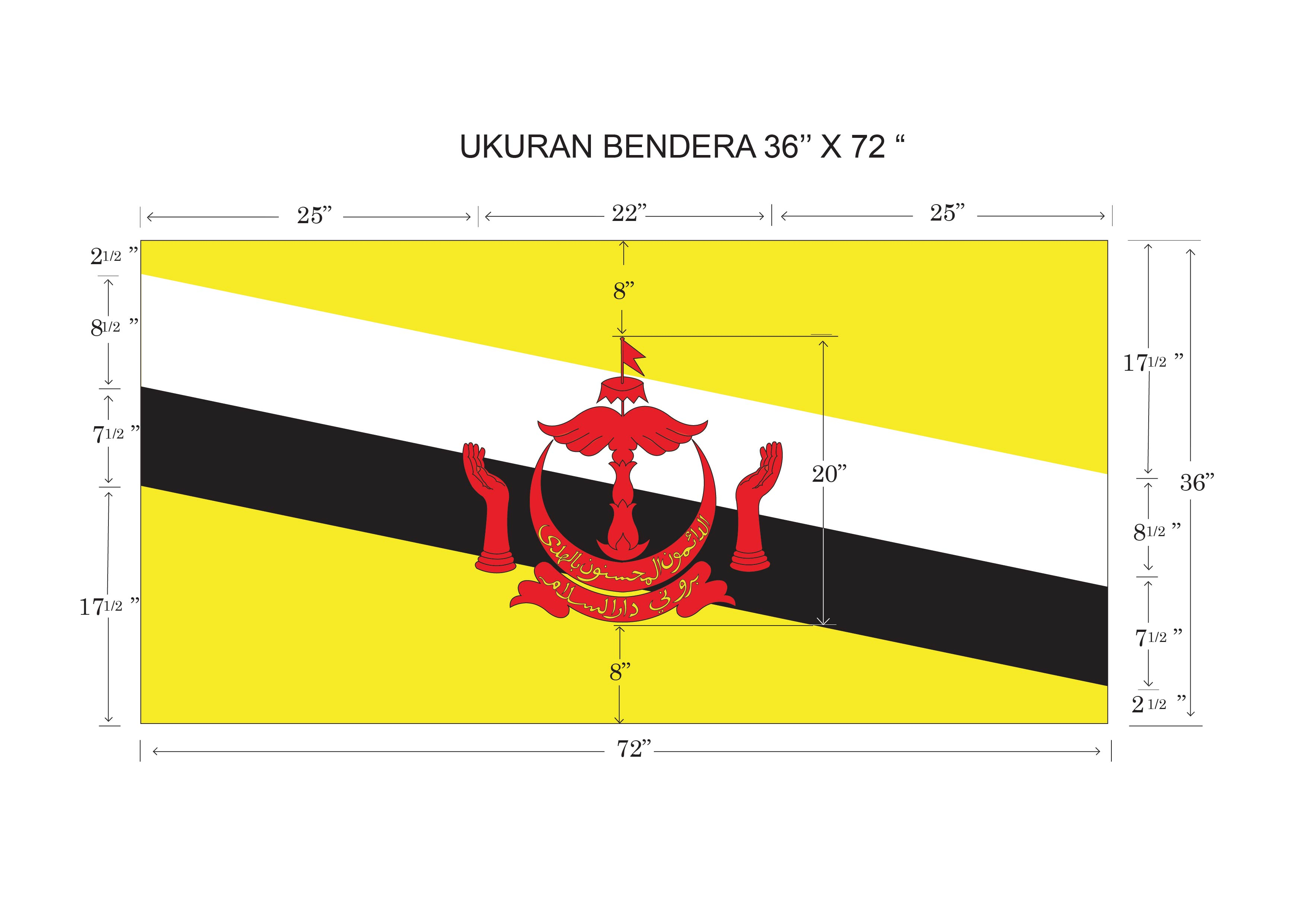
Flag construction sheet

== Historical flags ==
Flag from 1888 to 1906

Flag from 1906 to 1959

== See also ==
- Emblem of Brunei
- List of Bruneian flags
