= List of Qatari flags =

The following is a list of flags and banners used in Qatar.

== National flag ==
Flag	Date	Use	Description
	1971–present	Flag of Qatar	A white band on the hoist side, separated from a maroon area on the fly side by nine white triangles which act as a serrated line. The normal proportions of the flag are 11∶28.

== Air Force flag ==
Flag	Date	Use	Description
	1974–present	Flag of the Qatar Emiri Air Force	A light blue flag with the national flag in the canton, with the Qatar Air Force's roundel on the fly side.

== Historical flags ==
=== Sasanian Empire ===
Flag	Date	Use	Description
	224–651	Flag of the Sasanian Empire	A lotus on a purple field, was encrusted with jewels and had trailing red, gold, and purple streamers on its edges.

=== Under Arab rule ===
Flag	Date	Use	Description
	698–750	Flag of the Umayyad Caliphate	A white field.
	750–899	Flag of the Abbasid Caliphate	A black field.

=== Jabrids ===
Flag	Date	Use	Description
	1417–1520	Flag of the Jabrid Emirate	A red field with a white symbol in the center and white Arabic text above.

=== Portuguese Empire ===
Flag	Date	Use	Description
	1520–1521	Flag of the Kingdom of Portugal	White field with the royal coat of arms in the middle.
	1521–1550	Flag of the Kingdom of Portugal	White field with the royal coat of arms in the middle.

=== Ottoman Empire ===
Flag	Date	Use	Description
	1550–1670	Flag of the Ottoman Empire	
	1872–1916	Flag of the Ottoman Empire	A red field with a white crescent moon and a 5-pointed star.
	1916	Flag of Qatar during the Ottoman Empire	A red field with a white border and a golden crescent moon.

=== Omani Empire ===
Flag	Date	Use	Description
	1670–1783	Flag of the Imamate of Oman	A white field with the royal emblem in the upper hoist corner.
	1696–1783	Flag of the Omani Empire	A white field with a red sword and red Arabic script below.

=== Under Bahrain ===
Flag	Date	Use	Description
	1783–1820	Flag of Bahrain	A simple red field.
	1820–1860	Flag of Bahrain	A red field with a white vertical stripe at the hoist.

=== Emirate of Diriyah ===
Flag	Date	Use	Description
	1798–1818	Flag of Diriyah	A green field with a vertical white band at the hoist and Arabic text written in white in the center.

=== Pre-British Qatar ===
Flag	Date	Use	Description
	1860–1872	Flag of Qatar	A white band on the hoist side, separated from a red area on the fly side by eleven white triangles which act as a serrated line.

=== British Qatar ===
Flag	Date	Use	Description
	1916–1971	Flag of the United Kingdom	A superimposition of the flags of England and Scotland with the Saint Patrick's Saltire (representing Ireland).
	1916–1947	Flag of British India	A Red Ensign with the Union Jack at the canton, defaced with the Star of India emblem displayed in the fly.
	1968–1971	Flag of Trucial States	A horizontal triband of red, white, and red, with a green seven-pointed star in the white band.
	1916–1932	Flag of Qatar	A white band on the hoist side, separated from a red area on the fly side by eleven white triangles which act as a serrated line.
	1932–1936	Flag of Qatar	A white band on the hoist side, separated from a maroon area on the fly side by ten white triangles which act as a serrated line, with maroon diamonds offset from the base of each white triangle towards the hoist.
	1936–1949	Flag of Qatar	A white band on the hoist side, separated from a maroon area on the fly side by ten white triangles which act as a serrated line, with maroon diamonds offset from the base of each white triangle towards the hoist, and "Qatar" in Arabic in the center.
	1949–1971	Flag of Qatar	A white band on the hoist side, separated from a maroon area on the fly side by nine white triangles which act as a serrated line.

== See also ==
- Flag of Qatar
- Emblem of Qatar
