= List of Uzbek flags =

This is a list of flags used currently or previously by Uzbekistan.

== National Flag ==
Flag	Date	Use	Description
	1991–present	Flag of Republic of Uzbekistan	Three horizontal blue, white and green stripes, separated by two narrow red stripes. A crescent and twelve stars in three rows are situated on the left side of the upper blue stripe.

== Government Flag ==
Flag	Date	Use	Description
	1992–present	Presidential Standard of Uzbekistan	Three horizontal blue, white and green stripes, separated by two narrow red stripes with the Presidential Seal of Uzbekistan in the centre.

== Military Flag ==
Armed Forces of the Republic of Uzbekistan

Flag	Date	Use	Description
	1992–present	Flag of the Ministry of Defense of Uzbekistan and Armed Forces of the Republic of Uzbekistan	
	1992–present	Flag of the Uzbek Ground Forces	
	1992–present	Flag of the Uzbek Air Defense Forces and the Air Force	This is a flag for Uzbekistan's Air Force. It includes the Uzbekistan Air Force's roundel in the center surrounded by radiating shapes. The radiating shapes resemble those around the naval jack of the Netherlands.
		Flag of the Uzbekistan Airborne Troops	
	1992–present	Flag of the Uzbek River Force	
	1992–present	Flag of the Uzbekistan National Guard	
	1992–present	Flag of the Border Troops of the State Security Service	

== Autonomous Republic ==
Flag	Date	Use	Description
	1991–present	Flag of the Republic of Karakalpakstan	

== Historical Flags ==
Flag	Date	Use
	1370–1507	Banner of Tamerlane
	1785–1870	Flag of the Emirate of Bukhara
	1920	Flag of the Emirate of Bukhara
	1917–1920	Flag of the Khanate of Khiva (Qungrat dynasty)
	1917–1918	Flag of the Turkestan Autonomy
	1921–1923	Flag of the Bukharan People's Soviet Republic
	1920–1923	Flag of the Khorezm People's Soviet Republic
	1919–1921	Flag of the Turkestan Autonomous Soviet Socialist Republic
	1921–1924	Flag of the Turkestan Autonomous Soviet Socialist Republic
	22 July 1925–1927	Flag of the Uzbek Soviet Socialist Republic (First version)
	1927-9 May 1929	Flag of the Uzbek Soviet Socialist Republic (Second version)
	9 May 1929-28 February 1931	Flag of the Uzbek Soviet Socialist Republic (Third version)
	28 February 1931–1934	Flag of the Uzbek Soviet Socialist Republic (Fourth version)
	1934–1935	Flag of the Uzbek Soviet Socialist Republic (Fifth version)
	1934–1937	Flag of the Karakalpak Autonomous Soviet Socialist Republic
	1935-14 February 1937	Flag of the Uzbek Soviet Socialist Republic (Sixth version)
	14 February 1937-23 July 1938	Flag of the Uzbek Soviet Socialist Republic (Seventh version)
	1937–1952	Flag of the Karakalpak Autonomous Soviet Socialist Republic
	23 July 1938-16 January 1941	Flag of the Uzbek Soviet Socialist Republic (Eighth version)
	1939–1941	Flag of the Uzbek Soviet Socialist Republic (Ninth Version)
	1941–1952	Flag of the Uzbek Soviet Socialist Republic (Tenth Version)
	1952–1991	Flag of the Karakalpak Autonomous Soviet Socialist Republic
	1952–1991	Flag of the Uzbek Soviet Socialist Republic (Final version)
