= Flag of Kuban =

Historical flag

Kuban
- Use: National flag and civil ensign
- Proportion: 2:3
- Adopted: 10 February 1919
- Design: Blue-raspberry-green triband, ratio of stripes 1+2+1.

The flag of Kuban is a horizontal tricolour of blue, raspberry, and green. The purple band is twice the width of the other two and referred to the common name of this area as Raspberry Klin, analogous to Green Klyn. The flag was adopted by Kuban Parliament on 10 February 1919 as the national and state flag of the Kuban People's Republic. The flag of Krasnodar Krai has identical colours, but is charged with a golden coat of arms in the center.

== See also ==
- Spanish fess
