= List of flags of Nepal =

Flags of Nepal

This is a list of flags currently or historically used in Nepal.

== National flags ==
Flag	Date	Use	Description	Ref(s).
	1962—present	National flag of Nepal	Double-pennon with sun and the crescent moon without the faces to modernize the flag.	
	c. 1930—1962	Former national flag of Nepal	Double-pennon with sun and the crescent moon with faces.	
	1856—c. 1930	Former national flag of Nepal	Double-pennon with sun and the crescent moon with faces.	
	19th century	Former national flag of Nepal	Double-pennon with sun and the crescent moon.	

== Military flags ==
The following is a list of flags of some units in the Nepali Army. It does not include the military flags of all Nepali units.

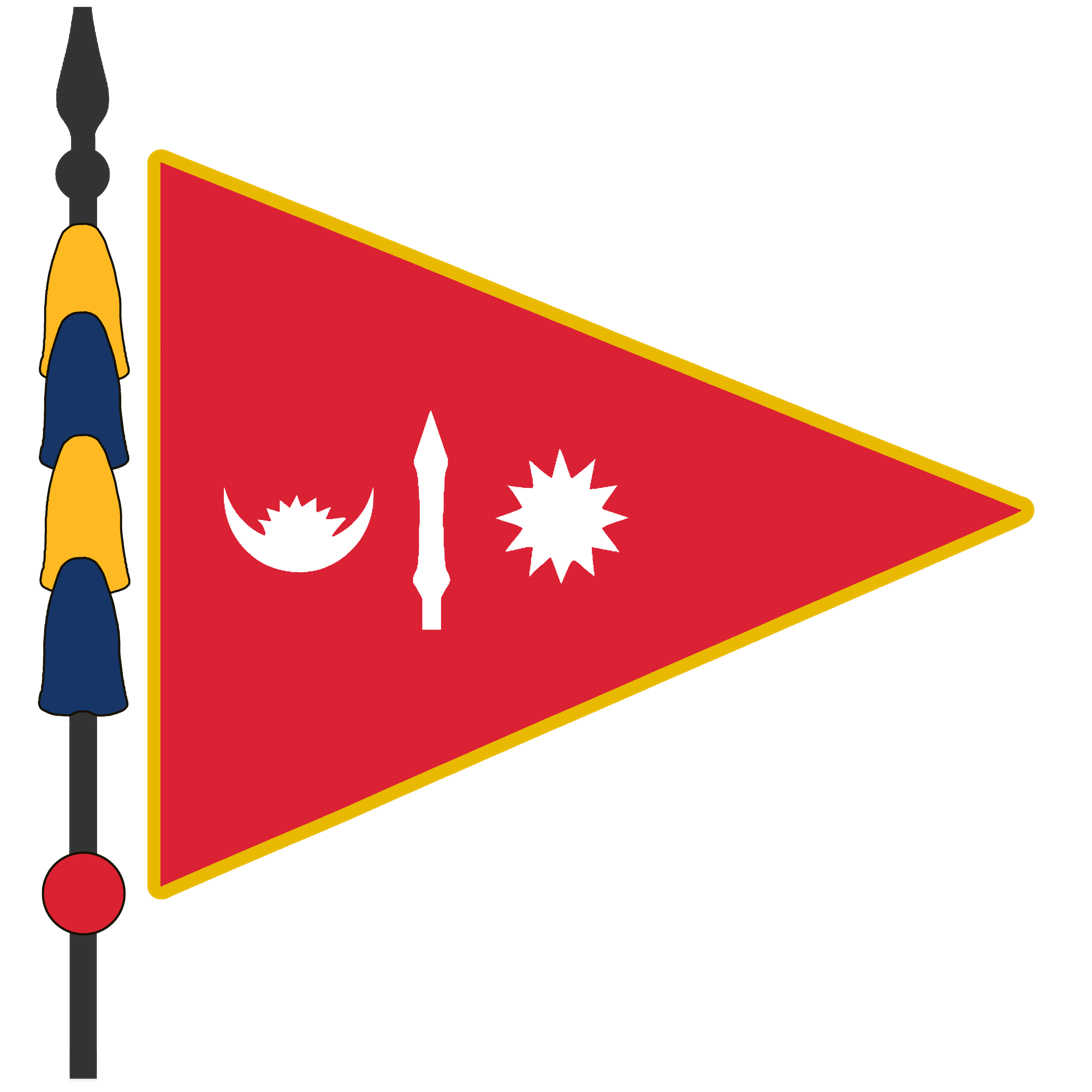
Digital illustration of Sabuj Battalion

Sabuj Battalion

Shreejung Battalion

Ranabhim Battalion

Bhawani Buksh Battalion

Jwala Dal Battalion

Tara Dal Battalion

Bhairavi Dal Battalion

Kali Buksh

Purano Gorakh Battalion

Rana Shardul Battalion

Jabar Jung Battalion

Singh Nath Battalion

Devidutta Battalion

Shree Nath Battalion

Naya Gorakh Battalion

Barda Bahadur Battalion

Naya Shree Nath Battalion

Batuk Dal Battalion

Durga Buksh Battalion

Raj Dal Battalion

== Royal flags ==
Flag	Date	Use	Description	Ref(s).
	2001–2008	Royal Standard	Rectangle flag with sun and the crescent moon without the faces to modernize the flag.	
	1969–2001	Royal Standard	Rectangle flag with sun and the crescent moon.	
	1928–1969	Royal Standard	Rectangle flag with sun and the crescent moon.	

== City flags ==
Flag	Date	Use	Description	Ref(s).
	unknown	Flag of Kathmandu		

== Historical flags ==
Flag	Date	Use	Description	Ref(s).
	1380	Flag of Mustang Kingdom		
	Unknown	Former flag of Mustang Kingdom		

== Political flags ==
Flag	Date	Party	Description
Current
	2022–present	Nepal Socialist Party	
	2021–present	Communist Party of Nepal (Unified Socialist)	
	2021–present	Communist Party of Nepal (Unified Marxist–Leninist)	
	2021–present	Democratic Socialist Party	
	2021–present	Terai Madhesh Loktantrik Party	
	2020–present	People's Socialist Party	
	2019–present	Janamat Party	
	2017–present	Bibeksheel Sajha Party	
	2016–present	Nepal Federal Socialist Party	
	2008–present	Rastriya Janata Dal Nepal	
Link to file	2007–present	Sanghiya Loktantrik Rastriya Manch	
Link to file	2007–present	All Nepal Democratic Youth Association	
Link to file	1999–present	Rastriya Janamorcha	
	1994–present	Communist Party of Nepal (Maoist Centre)	
	1990–present	People's Liberation Party	
	1990–present	Rastriya Prajatantra Party	
	1975–present	Nepal Workers Peasants Party	
	1975–present	Nepal Revolutionary Students' Union	
	1970–present	Nepal Student Union	
Link to file	1965–present	All Nepal National Free Students Union	
	1950–present	Nepali Congress	
Former
	2017–2020	Rastriya Janata Party Nepal	
	2017	Nepal Loktantrik Forum	
	2016–2019	New Force Party	
	2009–?	Nepal National Development Party	
	2007–2017	Terai Madhesh Loktantrik Party	
	2006–2015	Madhesi People's Rights Forum	
	2005–2013	Communist Party of Nepal (United Marxist)	
	2005–2007	Rastriya Janashakti Party	
	2002–2009	Communist Party of Nepal (Unity Centre–Masal)	
	1991–2021	Communist Party of Nepal (Unified Marxist–Leninist)	
	1985–2017	Nepal Sadbhawana Party	
