= Flag of the Turkmen Soviet Socialist Republic =

Turkmen Soviet Socialist Republic
- Use: Civil and state flag, civil and state ensign
- Proportion: 1:2
- Adopted: 1 August 1953; 23 September 1974 (revised)
- Relinquished: 19 February 1992
- Design: A plain red flag with a golden hammer and sickle and a gold-bordered red star in its upper canton with two blue bars in the middle of the flag.
- Reverse flag
- Use: Civil and state flag, civil and state ensign

The State Flag of the Turkmen Soviet Socialist Republic was adopted on 1 August 1953 and was replaced with the current flag of Turkmenistan in 1992. Although similar to the Flag of the Soviet Union, the layout is identical to the flag of the Kirghiz SSR with a ratio of 1:2. The two blue stripes (1/3) between the red (1/20) represents the rivers Amu Darya and Syr Darya, the red represents the "revolutionary struggle of the working masses", the hammer and sickle represents the peasants' and workers' union, and the red star is the symbol of the ruling Communist Party.

In 1926, the Turkmen flag was red with a large gold hammer and sickle in the top-left corner, similar to the flag of the Soviet Union. From 1937, the flag was red with the Latin characters (T.S.S.R.) in gold in the top-left corner, in a sans-serif font. From the 1940, the flag was the same, but with the characters in Cyrillic characters ТССР (TSSR).

On 26 September 1973, the Presidium of the Supreme Soviet of the Turkmen SSR modified the regulation of the flag of Turkmen SSR. The position of the star and hammer and sickle was moved closer to the flag pole.

Between independence in 1991 and adoption of the new flag in February 1992, this flag remained the national flag of independent Turkmenistan.

== History ==
=== Early project flags ===
The design of the proposed flag.

During the creation of the Constitution of the Turkmen SSR, a draft design for the flag of Turkmen SSR was created. The proposed flag was a red rectangular cloth depicting a golden sickle and hammer under the red 5-pointed star with a gold border and with drawings of four carpet gels on the main flag. But in the process of discussing the draft, this proposal was rejected.

First version of the flag (6 October 1926 - 2 March 1937)

=== First version ===
On 6 October 1926, the Central Executive Committee of the Soviets of the Turkmen SSR adopted the Constitution of the Turkmen SSR, which was then approved by the 2nd All-Turkmen Congress of Soviets on 30 March 1927.

The flag was described on the Article 83 of the Constitution :

The state flag of the Turkmen Socialist Soviet Republic consists of a panel of scarlet color, with an aspect ratio of 1: 2.
In the upper left corner of the cloth, the yellow color of the sickle and hammer is placed with the handles down. Above this image is placed a five-pointed star in the color of a cloth, bordered with a yellow stripe; with the sickle size 5/16 times the size of the flag and the star size 1/8 times the size of the flag.
The image of the sickle and hammer are located from the left edge of the flag on 1/8 of its width, and the bottom of the sickle and hammer is half that size, counting from the bottom edge of the flag.

— Constitution of the Turkmen Soviet Socialist Republic (1926), Article 83, Paragraphs 1-3

Second version of the flag (2 March 1937 - 19 July 1940)

=== Second version ===
On March 2, 1937, the Extraordinary 6th Congress of Soviets of the Turkmen SSR adopted a new Constitution of the Turkmen Soviet Socialist Republic. The flag of the Turkmen SSR is described in Chapter X, Article 122 of the constitution :

The state flag of the Turkmen Soviet Socialist Republic consists of a red cloth, in the left corner of which, at the top of the shaft, is written in golden letters “T.S.S.R.". The ratio of width to length is 1:2.

— Constitution of the Turkmen Soviet Socialist Republic (1937), Article 122

==== Revision ====
Third version of the flag (19 July 1940 - 1 August 1953)

In May 1940, the Turkmen script was translated from the Latinized alphabet into the alphabet based on the Russian alphabet. On July 19, 1940, by the Decree of the Presidium of the Supreme Soviet of the Turkmen SSR "On the inscription on the national flag of the Turkmen SSR," it was approved "to change the text of the inscription in accordance to the new alphabet." The Article 122 was changed in accordance to this decree:

The state flag of the Turkmen Soviet Socialist Republic consists of a red cloth, in the left corner of which, at the top of the shaft, is written in golden letters “T.C.C.P.". The ratio of width to length is 1:2.

— Constitution of the Turkmen Soviet Socialist Republic (1937, amended 1940), Article 122

Fourth version of the flag (1 August 1953 - 23 September 1974)

=== Third version ===
On August 1, 1953, by the Decree "On the State Flag of the Turkmen SSR", the Presidium of the Supreme Soviet of the Turkmen SSR decided:

...to make changes to the state flag of the Turkmen Soviet Socialist Republic and approve the state flag of the Turkmen Soviet Socialist Republic from a red cloth with a blue stripe in the middle along the entire length of the flag. The blue stripe is 1/3 of the width of the flag. A red stripe runs along the blue stripe, equal to 1/20 of the flag's width. On the upper red part of the flag panel, at the hoist, there is a golden sickle and a hammer and above them is a red five-pointed star framed gold border. The ratio of the width of the flag to its length is 1:2.

— Decree "On the State Flag of the Turkmen SSR" (1953)

In accordance with this decree, the Constitution of the Turkmen SSR was amended. The design of the new flag is described in Article 122 of the constitution :

The state flag of the Turkmen Soviet Socialist Republic consists of a red cloth with a blue stripe in the middle the full length of the flag. The blue bar is 1/3 the width of the flag. Along the blue strip, in the middle, there is a red strip, equal to 1/20 of the width of the flag. On the upper red part of the flag panel, at the flagpole, there is a golden sickle and a hammer, and above them is a red five-pointed star framed by a gold border. The ratio of the width of the flag to its length is 1:2.

— Constitution of the Turkmen Soviet Socialist Republic (1937, amended 1953), Article 122

On May 16, 1956, the Decree of the Presidium of the Supreme Soviet of the Turkmen SSR approved the Regulations on the State Flag of the Turkmen SSR, in which it was specified that :

The hammer and sickle fit into a square whose side is 1/4 the width of the flag. The sharp end of the sickle falls in the middle of the upper side of the square, the sickle and hammer handles rest on the lower corners of the square. The length of the hammer with a handle is 4/5 of the diagonal of the square. The five-pointed star fits into a circle with a diameter of 1/8 of the flag's width, touching the upper side of the square. The distance of the vertical axis of the star, sickle and hammer from the shaft is 1/4 of the width of the flag. The distance from the top edge of the flag to the center of the star is 1/10 of the width of the flag.

— Regulations on the State Flag of the Turkmen SSR (1956)

On September 20, 1966, by the Decree of the Presidium of the Armed Forces of the Turkmen SSR, the provision on the Turkmen SSR flag was supplemented: the list of holidays on which the flag of the republic was required was changed.

Approved by the Resolution of the Council of Ministers of the TSSR on September 26, 1973 (Resolution No. 353), the Instruction on the use of the Regulations on the State Flag of the Turkmen SSR, among other things, stipulated the possibility of raising the TSSR flag on sea vessels (forstenge) and on self-propelled vessels sailing (on bow mast) when they are the Chairman of the Presidium of the Supreme Soviet of the Turkmen SSR, Chairman of the Council of Ministers of the TSSR or other officials representing the Supreme Council of the TSSR and the Council of Ministers of the TSSR.

Fifth version of the flag (23 September 1974 - 19 February 1992)

==== Revision ====
On September 23, 1974, by a Decree of the Presidium of the Supreme Soviet of the Turkmen SSR, an amendment was made to the Regulations on the State Flag of the Turkmen SSR of 1956, which established a reduction in the side of the square into which the sickle and hammer fit, from 1/4 of the flag's width to 1/6 of the flag's width, and reducing the distance from the vertical axis of the star, sickle and hammer to the pole edge of the cloth from 1/4 of the flag's width to 1/10 of the flag's width, as a result of which the size of the sickle and hammer emblem decreased and was shifted closer to the flagpole.

On April 13, 1978, the extraordinary 9th session of the Supreme Soviet of the Turkmen SSR of the 9th convocation adopted a new Constitution of the Turkmen SSR. The flag was described in article 169 of the Constitution:

The state flag of the Turkmen Soviet Socialist Republic is a red rectangular panel with a blue stripe in the middle the full length of the flag. The blue bar is 1/3 of the width of the flag. Along the blue strip, in the middle, there is a red strip, equal to 1/20 of the width of the flag. On the upper red part of the flag panel, at the flagpole, there is a golden sickle and a hammer, and above them is a red five-pointed star framed by a gold border. The ratio of the width of the flag to its length - 1:2.

— Constitution of the Turkmen Soviet Socialist Republic (1978), Article 122

This description of the flag on May 6, 1978 by the Decree of the Presidium of the Supreme Soviet of the Turkmen SSR was included in the Regulations on the State Flag of the Turkmen SSR of 1956, which was amended by the Decree of the Presidium of the Supreme Soviet on September 23, 1974.

== See also ==
- Flag of the Soviet Union
- Coat of arms of the Turkmen SSR
- Flag of Turkmenistan
