= Gul (design) =

Medallion-like motif, often octagonal, typical of carpets from Central and West Asia

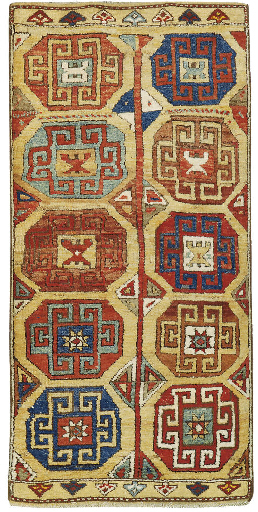
Konya 18th carpet with Memling gul design. There is a row of triangular amulet motifs (Muska) at top and bottom; each of the four lower gul has a star motif (Yıldız) at its centre.

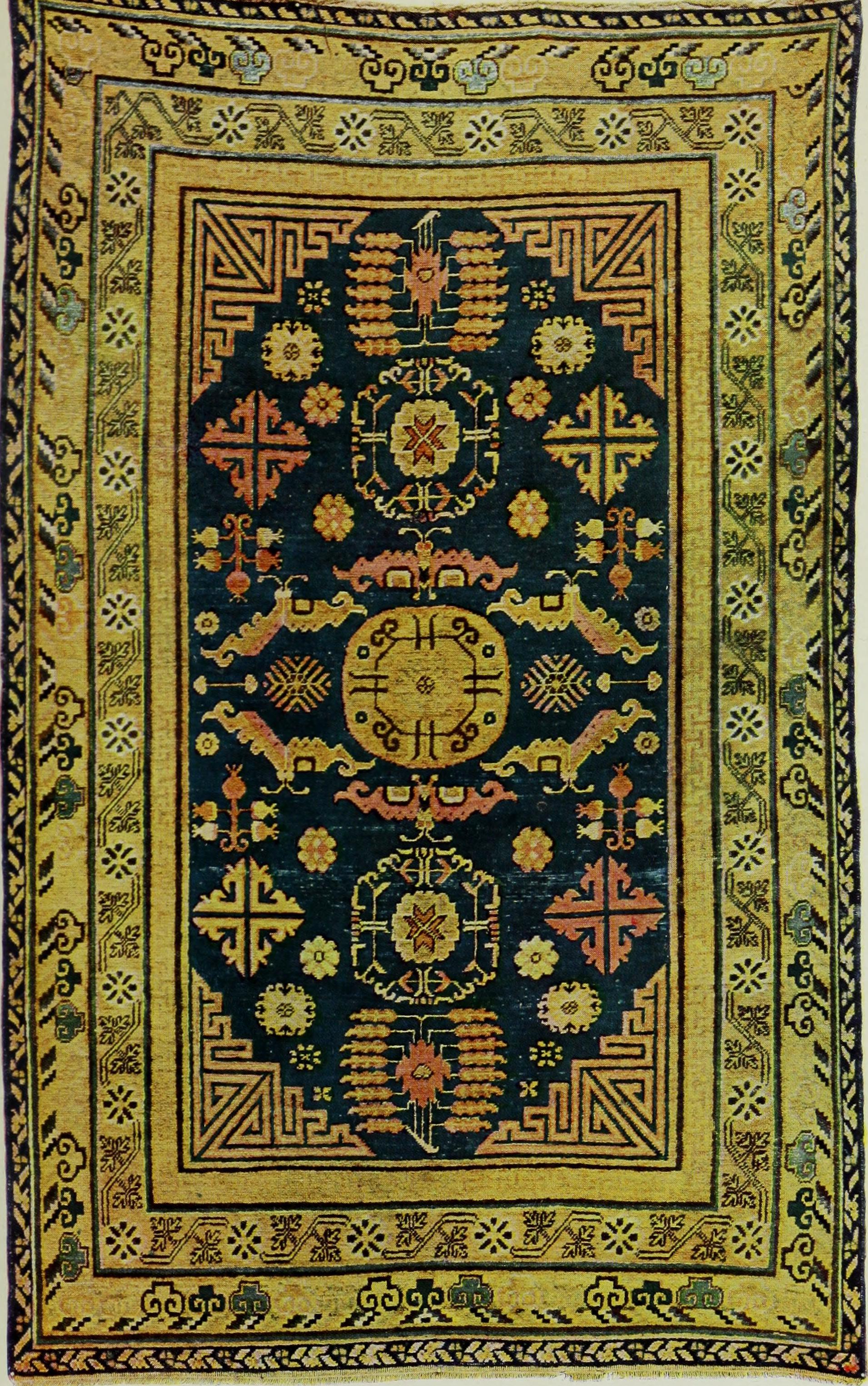
Turkmen carpet with three central gul medallions

A gul (also written gol, göl and gül in Turkish) is a medallion-like design element typical of traditional hand-woven carpets from Central and West Asia. In Turkmen weavings they are often repeated to form the pattern in the main field.

== Shape ==
Gul are medallions, often octagonal, and often somewhat angular on a generally octagonal plan, though they can be somewhat rounded within the constraints of carpet-weaving, and some are lozenge-shaped (rhombuses). They usually have either twofold rotational symmetry or mirror reflection symmetry (often both left/right and up/down).

Gul were historically described in the West as being elephant's foot motifs. Other Western guesses held that the gul was a drawing of a round Turkmen tent, with lines between tents representing irrigation canals; or that the emblem was a totemic bird. None of these descriptions have any basis in weaving tradition or culture.

== Etymology ==
The term gul, gol, göl or gül is used widely across Central and West Asia, and among carpet specialists in the West. It is derived from the Persian word gol (گل) which means flower or rose.

== Usage ==
In Turkmen weavings, such as bags and rugs, guls are often repeated to form the basic pattern in the main field (excluding the border).

The different Turkmen tribes such as Tekke, Salor, Ersari and Yomut traditionally wove a variety of guls, some of ancient design, but gul designs were often used by more than one tribe, and by non-Turkmens.

Western authors have used comparison of the "design vocabulary" of tribal guls, reproduced on traditional rugs, in studying the ethnogenesis of Asian peoples.

== In Western culture ==
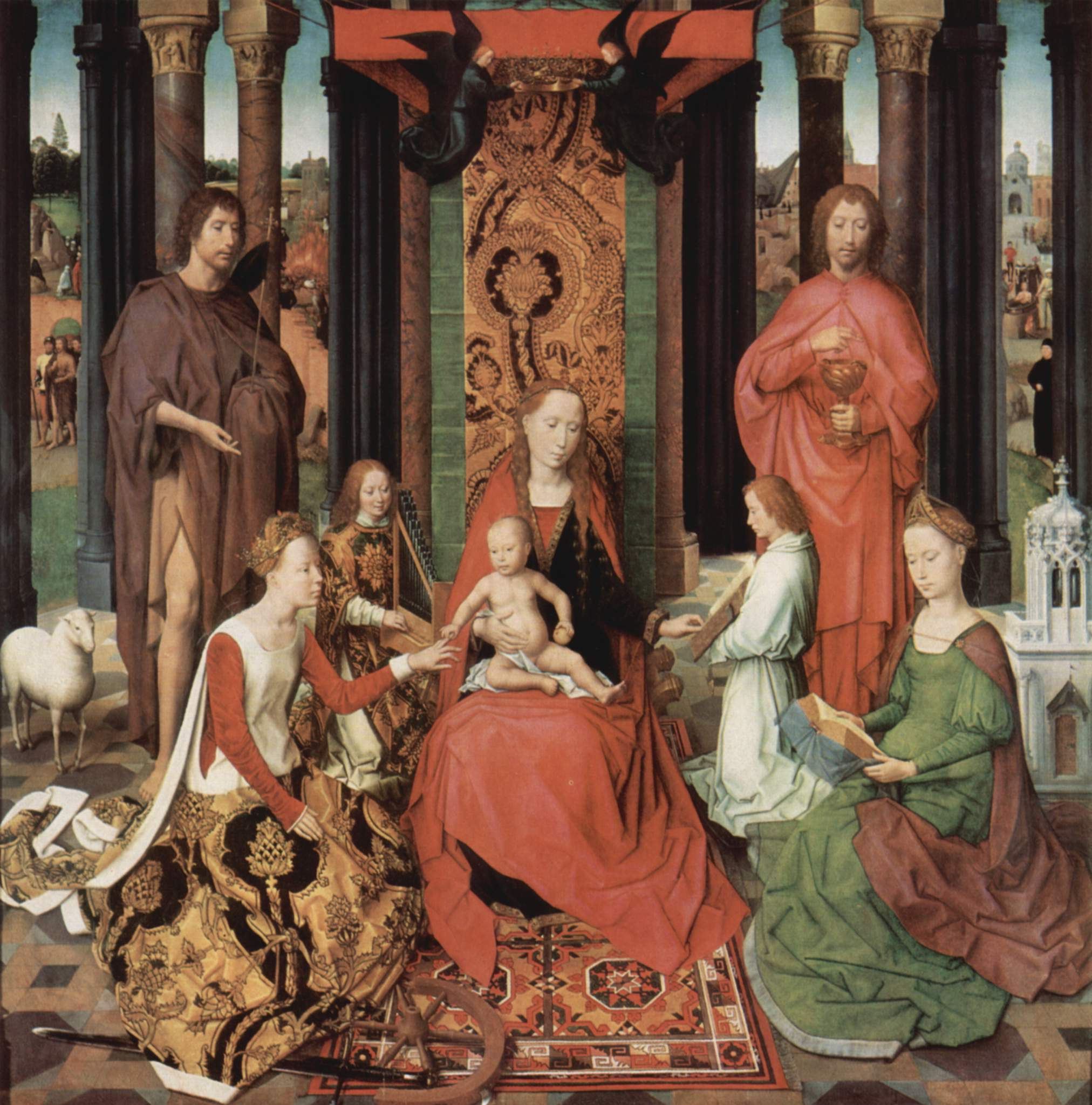
Triptych by Hans Memling, 1479, with a gul-patterned carpet at the Virgin's feet

Western artists including Hans Memling depicted oriental carpets from Turkish Anatolia with guls in several of his paintings, to the extent that these are known as Memling carpets. These guls often contain star or (hooked) dragon motifs as found on 15th century Konya carpets. The presence of the hooked motif defines a "Memling carpet". The artists Lorenzo Lotto and Hans Holbein who similarly depicted Anatolian carpets also have the varieties they painted named after them.

== See also ==
- Islamic geometric patterns
- Kilim motifs
- Flag of Turkmenistan
