= National emblem of Oman =

Versions
- Insignia with crown
- Armiger: Sultan of Oman
- Shield: A Khanjar (dagger) in a sheath that is superimposed upon two crossed swords

The national emblem of Oman (Arabic: شعار سلطنة عمان), nicknamed Khanjar Bo Sayfain (lit. 'Khanjar and two swords'), is an insignia consisting of a Khanjar inside its sheath that is superimposed upon two crossed swords. Adopted in the 18th century as the badge of the Omani royal family, it subsequently became the national emblem of the Sultanate of Oman. The emblem is featured at the canton on the Flag of Oman.

== History ==
The national emblem was first designed in the mid-18th century, when it was adopted as the royal emblem of the Al Said dynasty. Its usage was expanded when it subsequently became the national emblem of the sultanate. This occurred during the reign of either Faisal bin Turki (1888–1913) or Taimur bin Feisal (1913–1932). The emblem was later incorporated onto the canton of the country's national flag in 1970. Moreover, in order to distinguish "directly royal entities" and create a distinct symbol for these organizations, a crown was added to the top of the national emblem. This modified insignia is utilized by the Diwan of Royal Court and on the badges of all branches of Sultan's Armed Forces, including the Royal Army, Royal Navy, Royal Air Force, Royal Guard, and Royal Oman Police – among many others.

== Design ==
=== Symbolism ===
According to the Omani Ministry of Foreign Affairs, the Khanjar – along with the two crossed swords – symbolize the historic weapons utilized by the people of Oman. They are attached together by an embellished [waist belt with its Khanjar at the centre.] The Khanjar itself is a national symbol of the sultanate, and is still worn by Omani men as a "ceremonial dagger" for formal occasions.

=== Legal protection ===
Under a Royal Decree issued in 2004, the Ministry of Commerce and Industry is required to give authorization before any merchandise – both domestic and foreign imports – is allowed to depict the national emblem. Failure to do so may result in the seizure of those products, along with a fine and prosecution. Furthermore, the decree also forbids the desecration and/or destruction of the emblem. Offenders are liable to a maximum fine of OMR 1,000 and imprisonment of up to three years.

== See also ==
- Culture of Oman
- Flag of Oman
