= Oman at the 2011 World Aquatics Championships =

Sporting event delegation

Flag of Oman

Oman competed at the 2011 World Aquatics Championships in Shanghai, China between July 16 and 31, 2011.

== Open water swimming ==
Men

Athlete	Event	Final	
Athlete	Event	Time	Position
Aiman Al-Qasmi	Men's 5km	1:02:28.7	42
Khalid Al-Kulaibi	Men's 5km	1:02:14.8	41
Mussallam Al-Khaduri	Men's 10km	2:11:41.2	53
Mohammed Al-Habsi	Men's 10km	2:12:25.8	56
