= Flag of Oman =

Sultanate of Oman
- Use: National flag, civil and state ensign
- Proportion: 4:7
- Adopted: 22 May 2004; 22 years ago (slight adaptation from 1970)
- Design: Two horizontal stripes of upper white and lower green, separated by a red horizontal "T" shape in the centre that contains with the National emblem of Oman
- Designed by: Qaboos bin Said
- Naval ensign
- Use: Naval ensign
- Proportion: 2:3
- Design: A blue field with the national flag in the canton and the royal navy emblem placed in the lower fly.

The national flag of Oman (Arabic: علم عُمان) consists of two horizontal stripes of upper white and lower green, separated by a red horizontal "T" shape in the centre that contains the national emblem of Oman (crossed swords over a khanjar, a traditional curved dagger).

== History ==
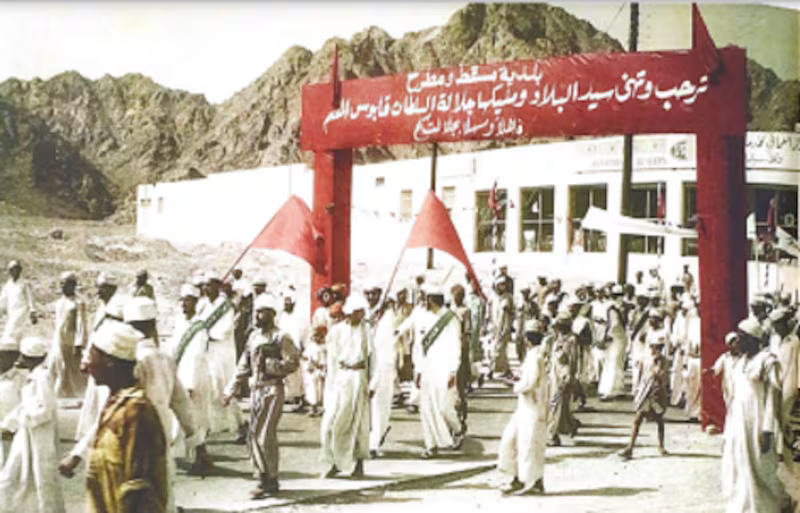
Omanis welcome the new sultan, using the plain red banner, c. 1970

Until 1970, Sultanate of Muscat and Oman used the plain red banner. After Sultan Qaboos bin Said overthrew his father in the 1970 coup, he introduced a new national flag and set of ensigns. The simple red flag was modified by addition of white and green bands to the fly, and the national emblem, the badge of the Al Bu Said dynasty, was placed in the canton. The new flag was adopted by a royal decree on 17th December 1970. Between 1970 and 1995, the size of the middle band of the triband was slimmer than the other two, making up approximately one fifth of its height, the other bands two-fifths.

On 25 April 1995, the flag's proportions were changed from 3:4 to 1:2.

On 22 May 2004, the flag was updated by a royal decree, whereby the proportions were changed to 4:7.

Flag of the Sultanate of Muscat and Oman 1856–1970

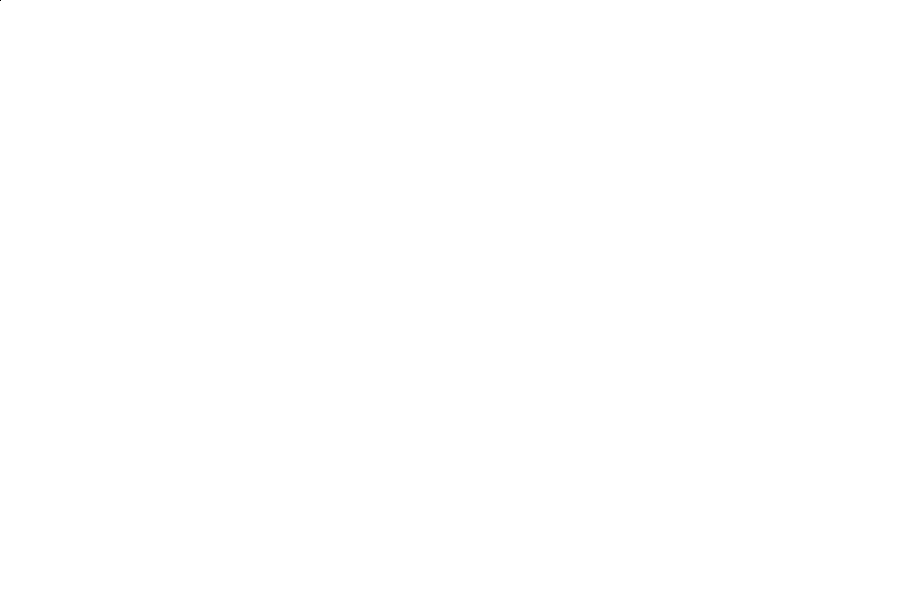
Imamate of Muscat and Oman 1868 to 1871

Flag of the Imamate of Oman from 1954 to 1959

Flag of Oman from 1970 to 1995

Flag of Oman from 1995 to 2004

== Design ==
=== Symbolism ===
White has been associated historically with the Imam, the religious leader of Oman, and at times the political rival to the ruling Sultan. It also symbolizes peace. Green is traditionally associated with the Jebel Akhdar Mountains, or "Green Mountains," which lie toward the north of the country, symbolizing the fertility of the land. Red harkens back to the old flag of the Sultanate of Muscat and Oman, and also represents the battles fought by the Omani people. The national emblem originates from the 18th century, when it was adopted as the royal crest of the Al Bu Said dynasty. A sheathed khanjar (curved dagger) is fastened over a pair of crossed swords, the traditional weapons of the Omani people.

=== Construction ===
Construction sheet of the flag.

Colours scheme	R	G	B	Hex	Preview
White	255	255	255	#FFFFFF	
Red	219	23	27	#DB171B	
Green	2	128	2	#028002	

== Other flags ==
The naval ensign shows an azure (blue) field, with the flag of Oman in the canton and the Royal Navy of Oman emblem in the lower fly. The flag for the Royal Army of Oman is a red field with the national flag placed in the canton and the Army emblem placed in the lower fly.

The standard of the Sultan of Oman is red with a green border whose width is about one-sixth of the height of the flag, surrounded by a red border of about the same width. It bears the royal emblem as a charge in the center, colored gold.

Standard of the Sultan

3:2 ratio version

Flag of the
Royal Army of Oman

Ensign of the
Royal Air Force of Oman

Naval Ensign of the Royal Navy of Oman

== See also ==
- List of Omani flags
- Coat of arms of Oman
