= List of flags by design =

Flags arranged by design

The parts of a flag using the terms of vexillology

This is a list of flags, arranged by design, serving as a navigational aid for identifying a given flag. Uncharged flags are ones that either are solid or contain only rectangles, squares and crosses but no crescents, circles, stars, triangles, maps, flags, coats of arms or other objects or symbols. Charged flags are flags that contain crescents, circles, stars, triangles, maps, flags, coats of arms and other objects or symbols, as well as rectangles, squares and crosses. Some charged flags contain letters or other pieces of text on them.

== Shape and aspect ratio ==
Flags occur in a variety of shapes and proportions, most commonly rectangular, with some featuring alternative forms, aspect ratios, or fringes at the fly.

Flag of Switzerland
— the aspect ratio is 1:1 — square-shaped

Flag of Vatican City
— the aspect ratio was defined as 1:1 in Article 23 of the 2023 Fundamental Law of Vatican City State — square-shaped — the prior flag of 2001→2023 was, but did not have to be square-shaped.

Wiphala
— the aspect ratio is 1:1 — square-shaped — with implied 13 diagonals of squares in a rainbow pattern of seven colours in a seven-by-seven square

Flag of Belgium
— the aspect ratio is 13:15 ≈ 1:1.1538

Flag of Monaco
— the aspect ratio is 4:5 ≡ 1:1.25

Flag of Niger
— the aspect ratio is 6:7 ≈ 1:1.667

Flag of France
— the aspect ratio is 2:3, one of the most common and conventional aspect ratios for national flags

Flag of Togo
— the aspect ratio is of Fibonacci's golden ratio that is approximately 1:1.618 ≈ 13:21

Flag of El Salvador
— the aspect ratio is 18:29 ≈ 1:1.611
(parade version of the civil flag)

Flag of El Salvador
— the aspect ratio is 189:335 ≈ 1:1.772
(government/state flag — civil flag is without the arms)

Flag of Qatar
— the largest aspect ratio of any national flag — being over 2½ times as long as the height — of 11:28 ≈ 1:2.545

Flag of the Republic of Venice / The Banner of Saint Mark the Evangelist
— an oblong flag with six fringes also serve to prevent damage being caused to the central section of the flag by wind.
(La Serenissima / Stato da Màr — 697→1797)

Flag of Venice
— an oblong flag with six fringes in a simplified variation of the Banner of Saint Mark, but still highly decorated orle bordered with insets of the Madonna and Child with Christian saints
(from 1997 — the City of Venice)

Flag of Denmark
— a swallowtail shape particular to Nordic nations
(government/state flag only — civil flag is oblong)

Flag of Iceland
— a swallowtail shape particular to Nordic nations
(government/state flag only — civil flag is oblong)

Flag of Norway
— a swallowtail shape particular to Nordic nations
(government/state flag only — civil flag is oblong)

Flag of Ohio, United States
— a non-rectangular guidon (burgee) form — the only U.S. state flag not rectangular — with a proportion of 8:13

Flag of China
— a triangular pennon form
(1862→1889)

Flag of Nepal
— currently the only non-rectangular national civil flag — being made with 5 sides — and the only one that is taller than wide, with the bordering aspect ratio of ≈ 6:5

Raven banner
— a tasseled circle quadrant shape

== Solid ==
Examples:

Flag of France
(1814–1830)

Flag of Old Bruneian Sultanate
(1368–1888)

Flag of Afghanistan
(used from 1709–1738 and 1880–1901)

Flag of North Yemen
(1918–1923)

Flag of Libya
(1977–2011)

Flag of the Crimean People's Republic
(1917)

Flag of the Socialist Soviet Republic of Lithuania and Belorussia
(1919–1920)

Flag of Antarctica (RRS Discovery crew)

=== Charged ===
While most charged flags are duotone or multicolor, they are referred to by their solid primary color foremost, with their charged symbol's color(s) and symbology following accordingly.

Examples:

Flag of Japan
— white flag, charged with a centered red circular disc representing the sun, embodying the name Land of the Rising Sun

Flag of Rapa Nui
— white flag, charged with a centered red Rei Miru, an ornamental Easter Island wearable wood carving

Flag of Corsica
— white flag, charged with a Moor's head in black

Flag of South Korea
— white flag, charged with the Taegeuk and four black trigrams

Olympic Flag
— white flag, charged with the Olympic rings in blue, yellow, black, green, and red, representing the five continents Europe, Asia, Africa, America, and Oceania

Flag of Afghanistan
— white flag, charged with the Shahada in back.

Flag of New Mexico, United States
— yellow flag, charged with a centered red Zia Pueblo sun symbol, colors of the Flag of Spain representing Hispano Nuevo México

Silver fern flag — black flag charged with a silver fern

Flag of Turkey — red flag, charged with a white star and crescent

Flag of the People's Republic of China
— red flag, charged with yellow canton stars in the top left corner, colors reminiscent of the Flag of the Qing dynasty and the Flag of the Republic of China

Flag of Bangladesh
— green flag, charged with a red disc on hoist

Flag of the United Nations — sky blue flag charged with the logo of the UN

Flag of the Commonwealth of Nations

Flag of the Commonwealth of Nations

Flag of New Hampshire, United States — an example of a Seal on a bedsheet design

Flag of the Crimean People's Republic

Flag of the Crimean Regional Government

Flag of the Armenian Kingdom of Cilicia

Flag of the Azerbaijan Democratic Republic

Flag of the Republic of Aras

Flag of Central Lithuania

Flag of the Principality of Moldavia

Flag of Navarre, Spain

Flag of the Andean Community

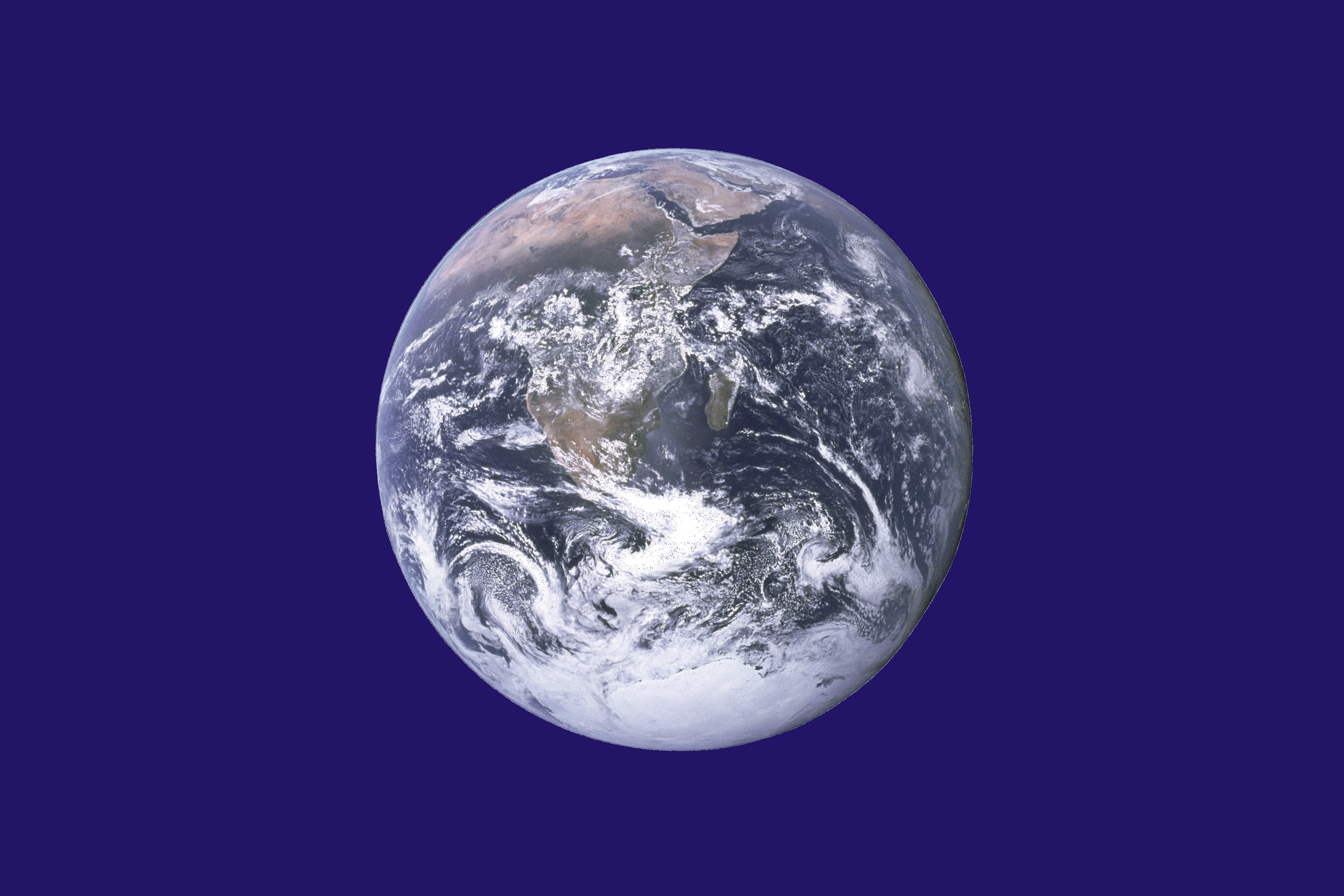
Flag of Earth (John McConnell)

Flag of Earth (Oskar Pernefeldt)

Flag of Earth (Tijs Bonekamp)

Flag of the World Service Authority

Flag of the East Turkestan independence movement

Flag of the Workers' Party of Korea

Flag of the Supreme Commander of the Korean People's Army

Flag of the President of South Korea

Flag of the Government of South Korea

Flag of Adygea, Southern Federal District, Russia

Flag of Kalmykia, Southern Federal District, Russia

Flag of Krasnoyarsk Krai, Siberian Federal District, Russia

Flag of Bryansk Oblast, Central Federal District, Russia

Flag of Orenburg Oblast, Volga Federal District, Russia

Flag of Sakhalin Oblast, Far Eastern Federal District, Russia

Flag of Tomsk Oblast, Siberian Federal District, Russia

Flag of Moscow Oblast, Central Federal District, Russia

Flag of Tula Oblast, Central Federal District, Russia

Flag of Ulyanovsk Oblast, Volga Federal District, Russia

Flag of Yaroslavl Oblast, Central Federal District, Russia

Flag of Lipetsk Oblast, Central Federal District, Russia

Flag of Voronezh Oblast, Central Federal District, Russia

Flag of Moscow, Central Federal District, Russia

Flag of Saint Petersburg, Northwestern Federal District, Russia

Flag of Sevastopol, Southern Federal District, Russia

== Bicolour ==
Examples:

Flag of Metz, Moselle, Grand Est, France
— vertical bicolour

Flag of Rome, Lazio, Italy
— vertical bicolour

Flag of Malta
— charged vertical bicolour

Flag of Connacht, Ireland
— charged vertical bicolour

Vatican City
— charged vertical bicolour

Flag of Buckinghamshire, South East England, England, United Kingdom
— charged vertical bicolour

Flag of Algeria
— charged vertical bicolour

Flag of Paris, Île-de-France, France
— charged vertical bicolour

Flag of Portugal
— charged uneven vertical bicolour

Flag of the Azores, Portugal
— charged uneven vertical bicolour

Flag of Orania, Thembelihle, Pixley ka Seme, Northern Cape, South Africa
— charged uneven vertical bicolour

Flag of Bahrain
— serrated uneven vertical bicolour

Flag of Qatar
— serrated uneven vertical bicolour

Flag of Poland
— horizontal bicolour

Civil Ensign of Bavaria, Germany
— horizontal bicolour

Flag of Warsaw, Masovian, Poland
— horizontal bicolour

Flag of The Hague, Haaglanden, South Holland, Netherlands
— horizontal bicolour

Flag of Indonesia
— horizontal bicolour

Flag of Monaco
— horizontal bicolour

Flag of the Austrian Empire (1282→1918)
— horizontal bicolour

Flag of Ukraine
— horizontal bicolour

Flag of Galicia and Lodomeria (1772–1849)
— horizontal bicolour

Flag of Courland, Latvia
— horizontal bicolour

Flag of the Ukrainian People's Republic (unofficial)
— horizontal bicolour

Flag of the Ukrainian People's Republic
— horizontal bicolour

Flag of the Principality of Moldavia (1831–1862)
— horizontal bicolour

Flag of Wales, United Kingdom
— charged horizontal bicolour

Flag of San Marino
— charged horizontal bicolour

Flag of Saxony-Anhalt, Germany
— charged horizontal bicolour

Flag of Singapore
— charged horizontal bicolour

Flag of Angola
— charged horizontal bicolour

Flag of Burkina Faso
— charged horizontal bicolour

Flag of Kansas City, Missouri, United States
— charged horizontal bicolour

Flag of Haiti
— charged horizontal bicolour

Flag of Liechtenstein
— charged horizontal bicolour

Flag of the Philippines
— charged horizontal bicolour

Flag of the Romani people
— charged horizontal bicolour

Flag of the Caribbean Community
— charged horizontal bicolour

Flag of the European Coal and Steel Community
— charged horizontal bicolour

Flag of Zaporizhzhia Oblast
— charged horizontal bicolour

Flag of South Korean National Liberation Front Preparation Committee
— charged horizontal bicolour

Flag of Republic of Korea Army
— charged horizontal bicolour

Hwanghae Province
— charged horizontal bicolour

Flag of the Ukrainian Soviet Socialist Republic, Soviet Union
— charged uneven horizontal bicolour

Flag of Tatarstan, Russia
— fimbriated horizontal bicolour

Flag of Antarctica (True South) – (horizontal bicolour)

Flag of Utrecht (city), Utrecht, Netherlands
— diagonal bicolour

Flag of Siberia, Russia
— diagonal bicolour

Flag of Sicily, Italy
— charged diagonal bicolour

Unofficial flag of French Guiana, France
— charged diagonal bicolour

Flag of anarcho-capitalism
— diagonal bicolour

Flag of Bhutan
— charged diagonal bicolour

Flag of Papua New Guinea
— charged diagonal bicolour

== Tricolour and other tribands ==
Examples:

Flag of the Canary Islands, Spain (vertical tricolour)

Flag of Peru
(vertical bicolour triband)

Flag of Guinea (vertical tricolour)

Flag of Chad (vertical tricolour)

Flag of Mars (Pascal Lee)
(vertical tricolour)

Flag of Belgium (vertical tricolour)

Flag of Italy (vertical tricolour)

Flag of Nigeria (vertical bicolour triband)

Flag of Ireland (vertical tricolour)

Unofficial flag of Newfoundland, Newfoundland and Labrador, Canada (vertical tricolour)

Flag of France (vertical tricolour)

Flag of Romania (vertical tricolour)

Flag of Ivory Coast (vertical tricolour)

Flag of Mali (vertical tricolour)

Flag of the League of Social Democrats of Vojvodina (vertical tricolour)

Flag of the Milk Tea Alliance (vertical tricolour)

Flag of the Emirate of Afghanistan (1929) (vertical tricolour)

Flag of the Newfoundland Natives' Society (vertical tricolour)

Flag of the Northwest Territorial Imperative (vertical tricolour)

Flag of Cameroon (vertical tricolour)

Flag of Andorra (vertical tricolour)

Flag of Saint Vincent and the Grenadines (vertical tricolour)

Flag of Moldova (vertical tricolour)

Flag of Mongolia (charged vertical bicolour triband)

Flag of Afghanistan (2013–2021) (charged vertical tricolour)

Flag of Mexico (charged vertical tricolour)

Flag of Senegal (charged vertical tricolour)

Flag of the Pieds-noirs (charged vertical tricolour)

Flag of New York City, New York State, United States (charged vertical tricolour)

Flag of Barbados (charged vertical bicolour triband)

Flag of the Talysh-Mughan Autonomous Republic (charged vertical tricolour)

Flag of Guatemala (charged vertical bicolour triband)

Flag of the Interahamwe (charged vertical tricolour)

Flag of Manhattan, New York City, New York (state), United States (vertical tricolour)

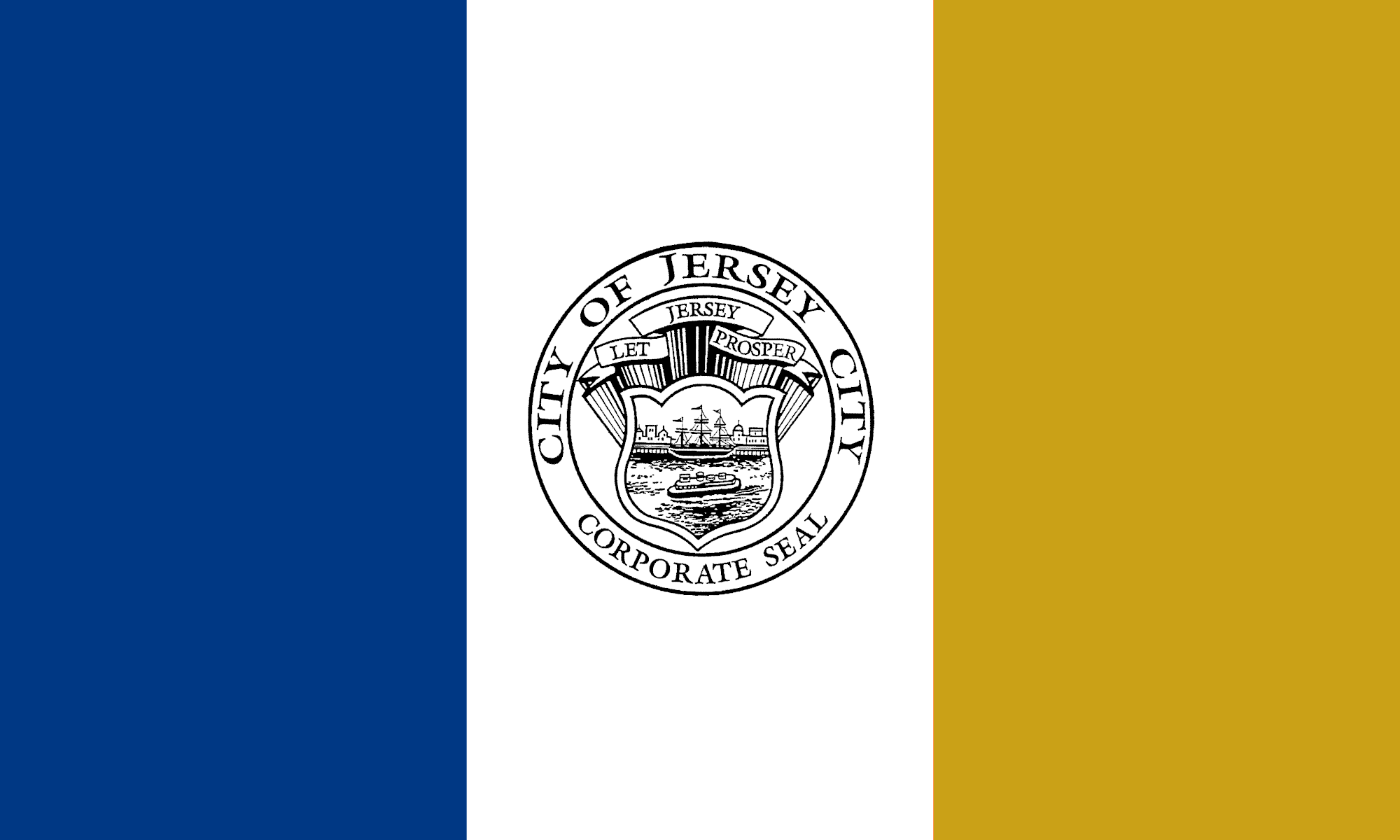
Flag of Jersey City, New Jersey, United States (vertical tricolour)

Flag of Tver Oblast, Central Federal District, Russia (vertical bicolour)

Flag of Rhodesia (vertical bicolour)

Volksfront flag (vertical tricolour)

Great Lakes Twa flag (vertical tricolour)

Flag of Madeira, Portugal (vertical bicolour)

Flag of the Movement of Democratic Forces of Casamance (vertical tricolour)

Flag of the Eastern Front (vertical tricolour)

Flag of Buganda (vertical bicolour)

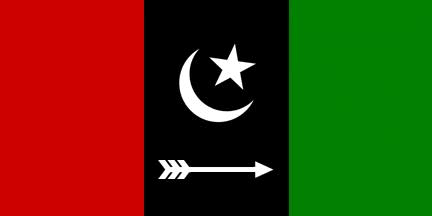
Flag of the Pakistan People's Party (vertical tricolour)

Flag of Norfolk Island, Australia (vertical bicolour)

Flag of the World Taiwanese Congress (vertical bicolour)

Flag of Los Angeles (charged serrated tricolour)

Flag of Canada (charged uneven vertical triband, Canadian pale)

Flag of the Northwest Territories, Canada (charged uneven vertical triband, Canadian pale)

Flag of Mississippi, United States (charged uneven fimbriated vertical triband)

Flag of Antarctica (Olivier Leroi) (uneven fimbriated vertical tricolor)

Flag of Pashtunistan (charged uneven vertical bicolor)

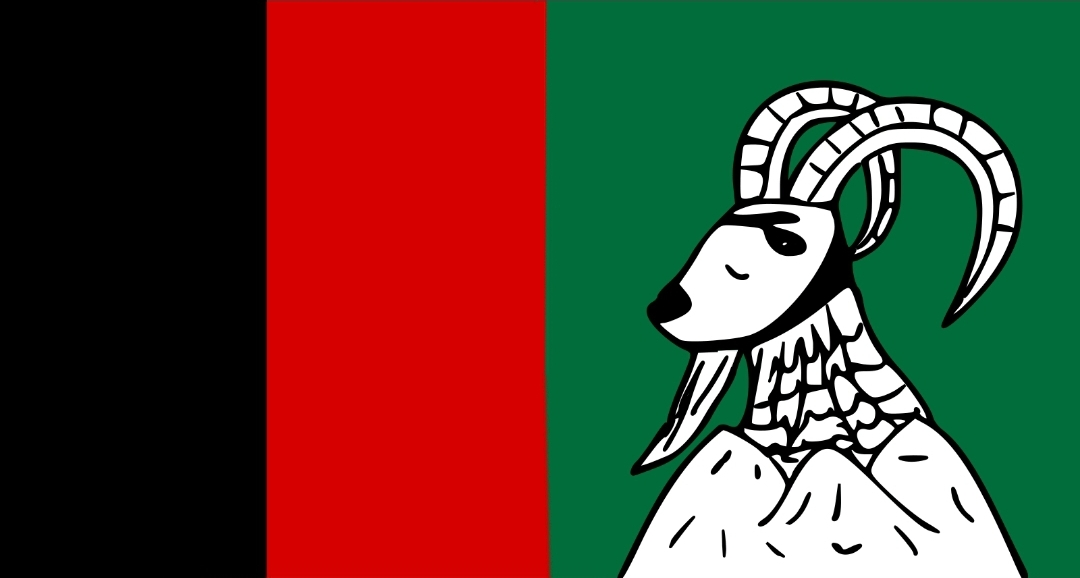
Flag of the Balawaristan National Front (charged uneven vertical tricolor)

Flag of the Belarusian People's Republic (horizontal bicolour triband)

Flag of South Ossetia
(horizontal tricolour)

Flag of Groningen (city), Groningen, Netherlands (horizontal bicolour triband)

Flag of Bulgaria (horizontal tricolour)

Russian anti-war flag (horizontal bicolour triband)

Flag of Russia (horizontal tricolour)

Flag of Baden
(horizontal bicolour triband)

Flag of Luxembourg (horizontal tricolour)

Flag of Lithuania (horizontal tricolour)

Flag of Austria (horizontal bicolour triband)

Flag of Hungary (horizontal tricolour)

Flag of the Netherlands (horizontal tricolour)

Flag of Bolivia (horizontal tricolour)

Pan-African flag (horizontal tricolour)

Flag of Armenia (horizontal tricolour)

Flag of Germany (horizontal tricolour)

Flag of Rotterdam, South Holland, Netherlands (horizontal bicolour triband)

Flag of Estonia (horizontal tricolour)

Flag of Yemen (horizontal tricolour)

Flag of Sierra Leone (horizontal tricolour)

Pansexual flag (horizontal tricolour)

Prince's Flag (horizontal tricolour)

Flag of the Donetsk People's Republic (horizontal tricolour)

Flag of the Luhansk People's Republic (horizontal tricolour)

Flag of Novorossiya (Oleg Tsaryov) (horizontal tricolour)

Flag of the Russian Empire (1858–1896) (horizontal tricolour)

Flag of Galicia and Lodomeria (1849–1890) (horizontal tricolour)

Flag of the Republic of Van (horizontal tricolour)

Flag of the Transcaucasian Democratic Federative Republic (horizontal tricolour)

Flag of the Centrocaspian Dictatorship (horizontal bicolour triband)

Flag of the German Empire (horizontal tricolour)

Flag of the Courland Governorate (horizontal tricolour)

Flag of the Sudan Liberation Movement (Minnawi) (horizontal tricolour)

Flag of the African National Congress (horizontal tricolour)

Flag of the Herat State (horizontal bicolour triband)

Flag of Hazaristan (horizontal tricolour)

Flag of Kurwai State (horizontal tricolour)

Flag of Bhopal State (horizontal tricolour)

Flag of Bharatpur State (horizontal tricolour)

Flag of the South West Africa People's Organisation (horizontal tricolour)

Flag of Dagestan, North Caucasian Federal District, Russia (horizontal tricolour)

Flag of Spanish Republican Flag (horizontal tricolour)

Flag of the Iskolat (horizontal bicolour triband)

Flag of Somaliland (horizontal tricolour)

Flag of El Salvador (charged bicolour triband)

Flag of Cambodia (horizontal bicolour triband)

Flag of Ethiopia (horizontal tricolour)

Flag of Malawi (horizontal tricolour)

Flag of Libya (horizontal tricolour)

Flag of Lesotho (horizontal tricolour)

Flag of Laos (horizontal bicolour triband)

Flag of Egypt (charged horizontal tricolour)

Flag of Croatia (charged horizontal tricolour)

Flag of Ghana (charged horizontal tricolour)

Flag of Amsterdam, North Holland, Netherlands (charged horizontal bicolour triband)

Flag of Serbia (charged horizontal tricolour)

Flag of Bangsamoro (horizontal tricolour)

Flag of Yugoslavia (charged horizontal tricolor)

Flag of Argentina (charged horizontal bicolour triband)

Flag of Colorado, United States (charged horizontal bicolour triband)

Flag of India (charged horizontal tricolour)

Flag of Nicaragua (charged horizontal bicolour triband)

Flag of Honduras (charged horizontal bicolour triband)

Flag of the Union of African States (charged horizontal tricolour)

Flag of Iraq (charged horizontal tricolour)

Flag of Ashkali and Balkan Egyptians (charged horizontal tricolour)

Flag of Lebanon (charged horizontal bicolour triband)

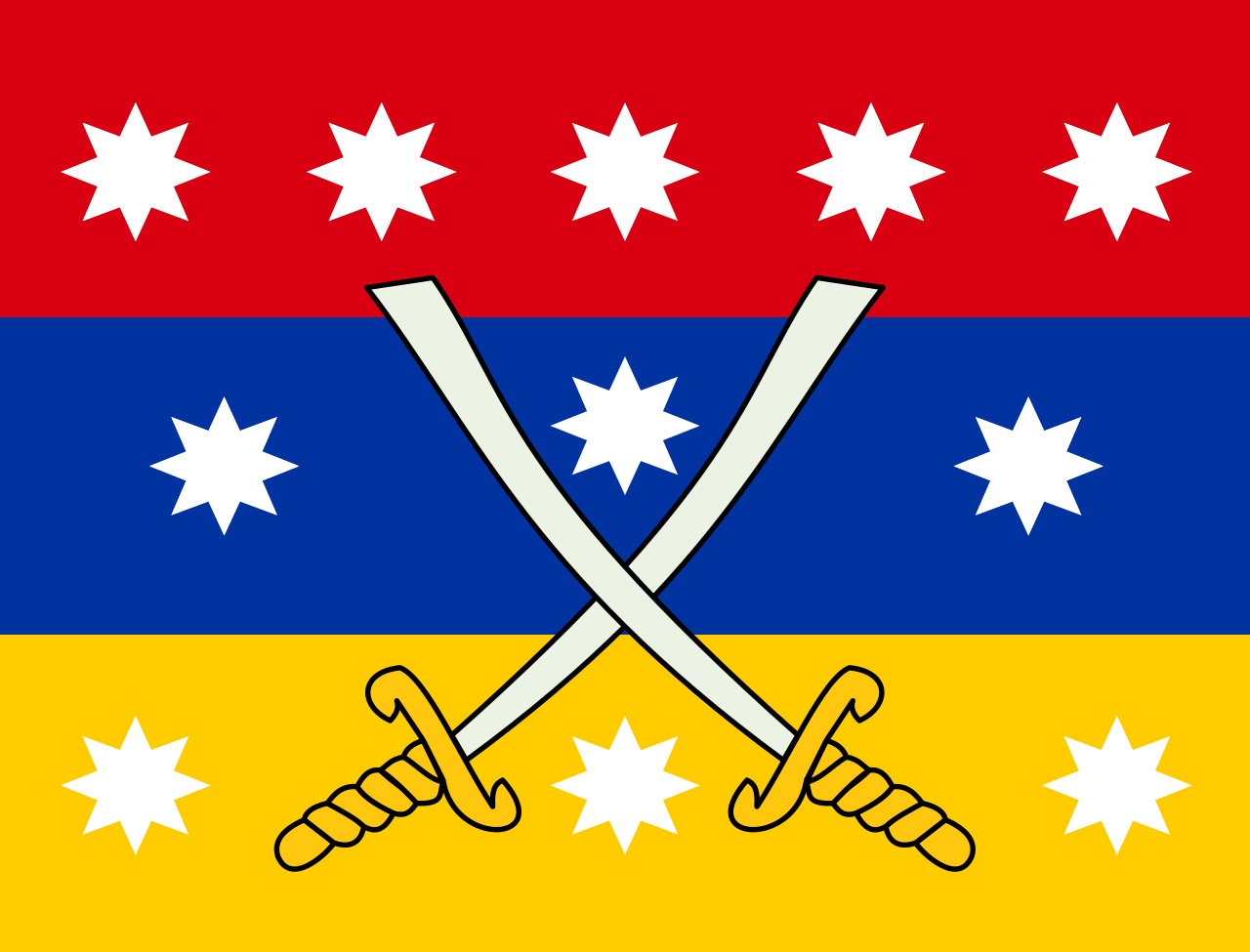
Flag of the Lusignan dynasty (horizontal tricolour)

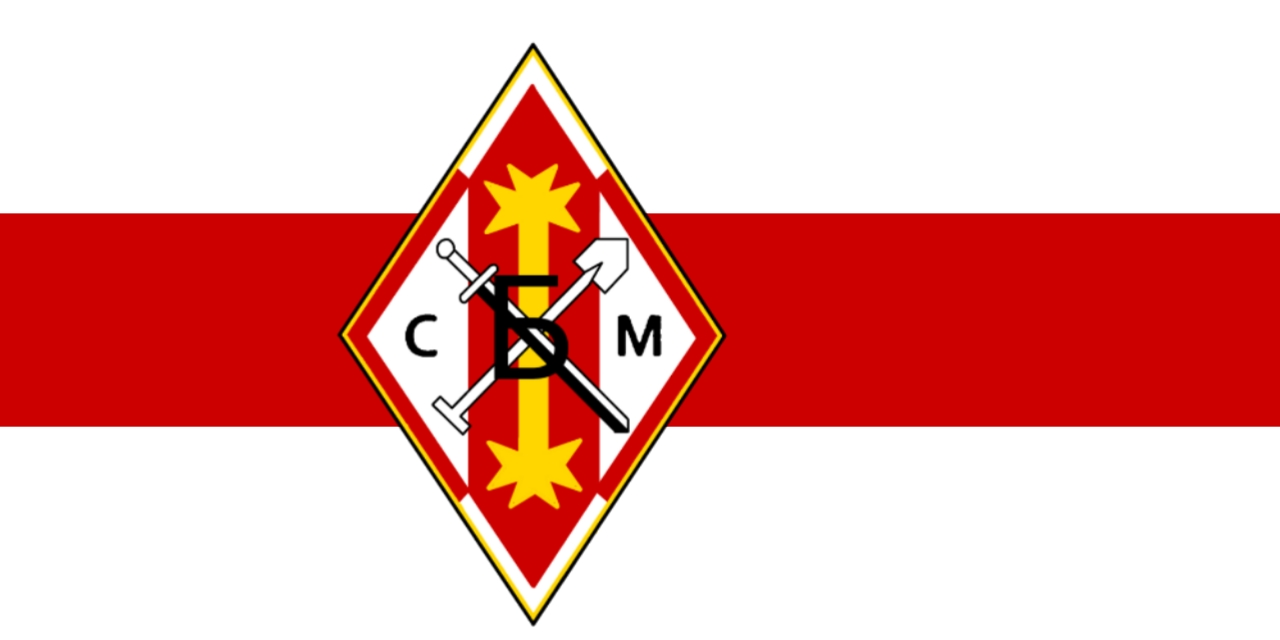
Flag of the Union of Belarusian Youth (horizontal bicolour triband)

Flag of the Kingdom of Lithuania (horizontal tricolour)

Flag of the Moldavian Democratic Republic (horizontal tricolour)

Flag of the Sudan Liberation Movement (Tambour) (horizontal tricolour)

Flag of the Ingush Liberation Army (horizontal bicolour triband)

Flag of the Socialist Women's Union of Korea (horizontal bicolour triband)

Flag of the Bronx, New York City, New York (state), United States (horizontal tricolour)

Flag of Albany, Capital District (New York), New York (state), United States (horizontal tricolour)

Flag of Schenectady County New York (state), United States (horizontal tricolour)

Flag of Ulster County New York (state), United States (horizontal tricolour)

Flag of the Democratic Republic of Afghanistan (horizontal tricolour)

Flag of the Islamic State of Afghanistan (horizontal tricolour)

Flag of Kharan, Dominion of Pakistan (horizontal tricolour)

Flag of the Nawabs of Mankera (horizontal tricolour)

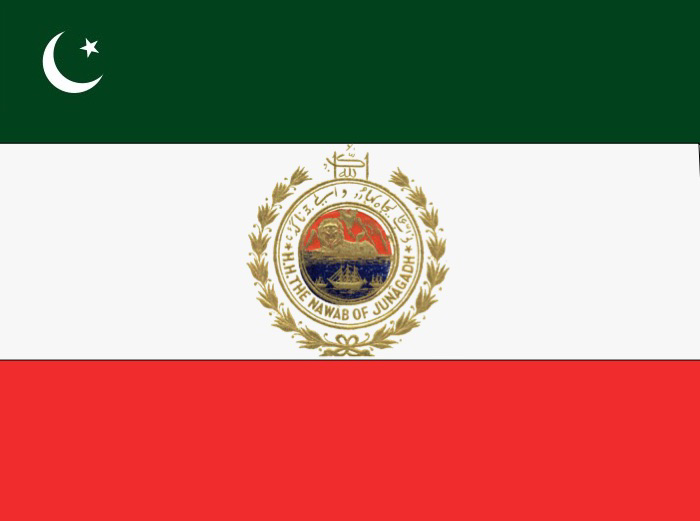
Flag of Junagadh State (horizontal tricolour)

Flag of the United Arab Republic (horizontal tricolour)

Flag of Pahlavi Iran (horizontal tricolour)

Flag of the Yemen Arab Republic (horizontal tricolour)

Flag of Ba'athist Iraq (horizontal tricolour)

Flag of Bashkortostan, Volga Federal District, Russia (horizontal tricolour)

Flag of Buryatia, Far Eastern Federal District, Russia (horizontal tricolour)

Flag of Kabardino-Balkaria, North Caucasian Federal District, Russia (horizontal tricolour)

Flag of Ecuador (uneven horizontal tricolour)

Flag of Spain (charged horizontal bicolour triband)

Flag of Latvia (uneven horizontal bicolour triband)

Flag of Antarctica (Dave Hamilton) (uneven horizontal tricolour)

Guna flag (uneven horizontal bicolour triband)

Flag of Ingushetia, North Caucasian Federal District, Russia (uneven horizontal bicolour triband)

Flag of Kherson Oblast (uneven horizontal bicolour triband)

Flag of Crimea (uneven horizontal tricolour)

Flag of Colombia (uneven horizontal tricolour)

Flag of the Republic of New Afrika (uneven horizontal tricolour)

Flag of the Republic of Afghanistan (uneven horizontal tricolour)

Flag of The Gambia (fimbriated horizontal tricolour)

Flag of Botswana (fimbriated horizontal bicolour triband)

Flag of the Organisation of African Unity (fimbriated horizontal bicolour triband)

Flag of North Korea (fimbriated horizontal bicolour triband)

Flag of Eswatini (fimbriated horizontal bicolour triband)

Flag of the Korean People's Army Strategic Force (fimbriated horizontal bicolour triband)

Flag of the Korean People's Army Ground Force (fimbriated horizontal bicolour triband)

Flag of the DPRK Missile Administration (fimbriated horizontal bicolour triband)

Flag of Kenya (charged fimbriated horizontal tricolour)

Flag of Iran (charged fimbriated horizontal tricolour)

Flag of Suriname (charged fimbriated horizontal bicolour triband)

Flag of Uzbekistan (charged fimbriated horizontal tricolour)

Flag of Transnistria (horizontal bicolour triband)

Flag of Trinidad and Tobago (fimbriated diagonal bicolour triband)

Flag of the Republic of the Congo (diagonal tricolour)

Flag of the Organisation of African, Caribbean and Pacific States (charged diagonal tricolour)

Flag of Sealand (diagonal tricolour)

Flag of Namibia (charged fimbriated diagonal tricolour)

Flag of Tanzania (fimbriated diagonal tricolour)

Flag of Saint Kitts and Nevis (charged fimbriated diagonal tricolour)

Flag of the Democratic Republic of the Congo (charged fimbriated diagonal bicolour triband)

Flag of the Galician independence movement (diagonal bicolour triband)

== Stripes ==
=== Four stripes ===
Examples:

Flag of the American Indian Movement (vertical stripes)

Flag of Mauritius (horizontal stripes)

Flag of the Comoros (horizontal stripes)

Flag of the Central African Republic (horizontal stripes)

Flag of the Druze people (horizontal stripes)

Asexual flag (horizontal stripes)

Flag of La Rioja (horizontal stripes)

=== Five or more stripes ===
Examples:

Free Speech Flag (five vertical stripes)

Flag of Northumbria (bicolor vertical stripes)

Unofficial civil flag of the United States used by sovereign citizens (bicolor vertical stripes)

Flag of Cuba (bicolor horizontal stripes)

Flag of China (1912–1928) (five horizontal multicolor stripes)

Flag of Costa Rica (uneven horizontal stripes)

Flag of Thailand (uneven horizontal stripes)

Flag of Uganda (six tricolor horizontal stripes)

Flag of Abkhazia (seven bicolor horizontal stripes)

Flag of Zimbabwe (seven multicolor horizontal stripes)

Flag of Hawaii, United States (eight tricolor horizontal stripes)

Rainbow pride flag (eight multicolor horizontal stripes)

Flag of Greece (nine horizontal stripes)

Flag of Catalonia, Spain (nine horizontal stripes)

Flag of the United States of America (thirteen even bicolor horizontal stripes)

Flag of Brazil (1889) (thirteen even bicolor horizontal stripes)

Flag of the British Indian Ocean Territory (wavy stripes)

Flag of Friesland (diagonal stripes)

Flag of Earth (James William van Kirk) (seven even horizontal stripes)

Brotherhood Flag (five even horizontal stripes)

=== Lines on a field ===
Flag of Volgograd Oblast, Russia (red field charged with two vertical blue stripes)

Flag of Nauru (blue field charged with one yellow stripe)

Flag of Curacao, Netherlands (blue field charged with one yellow stripe)

Flag of Aruba, Netherlands (blue field charged with two yellow stripes)

Flag of South Vietnam (yellow field charged with three horizontal red stripes)

Flag of Cape Verde (horizontal stripes)

Flag of Chechnya (1991–2000) (horizontal stripes)

Flag of the Estonian Soviet Socialist Republic, Soviet Union (Red field charged with blue and white wavy stripes)

Flag of the Adat People's Movement (horizontal stripes)

Flag of the Ministry of State Security (North Korea) (horizontal stripes)

Flag of the Korean People's Navy (horizontal stripes)

Flag of the Altai Republic, Siberian Federal District, Russia (horizontal stripes)

Flag of Ivanovo Oblast, Central Federal District, Russia (wavy stripes)

Flag of Chelyabinsk Oblast, Ural Federal District, Russia (one horizontal stripe)

Flag of Smolensk Oblast, Central Federal District, Russia (horizontal stripes)

Flag of Magadan Oblast, Far Eastern Federal District, Russia (wavy stripes)

Flag of Leningrad Oblast, Northwestern Federal District, Russia (wavy stripes)

=== Rays ===
Examples:

Naval jack of the Netherlands

Flag of North Macedonia

Japanese Naval Ensign

Flag of Réunion
— the Sun's rays radiating from the tip of a red volcano
(unofficial flag of the overseas department of France)

Flag of Tibet

Flag of Donetsk Oblast

Flag of Arizona, United States

Flag of Seychelles

Flag of the Marshall Islands (blue field charged with two diagonal rays)

== Quartered ==
Examples:

Flag of Plzeň (orthogonal)

Flag of Panama (orthogonal)

Flag of Barcelona, Spain (orthogonal)

Flag of Maryland, United States (orthogonal; the armorial banner of Baron Baltimore, stretched horizontally)

Royal standard of the United Kingdom (orthogonal)

Flag of Rio de Janeiro (state), Brazil (orthogonal)

Flag of Belgorod Oblast, Russia (orthogonal, with a cross)

Flag of the Dominican Republic (orthogonal, with a cross)

Flag of Groningen (province) (orthogonal, with a fimbriated cross)

Flag of the Tsardom of Russia (1668–1693) (orthogonal, with a cross)

Flag of the company P&O (diagonal)

Flag of Grenada (diagonal)

Flag of Jamaica (diagonal, with a saltire)

Flag of Burundi (diagonal, with a saltire)

Flag of Ceuta, Spain (gyronny)

== Cross ==
Examples:

Flag of England
(Saint George's Cross)

Flag of the Holy Roman Empire (1200–1350)

Flag of Saint Piran of Cornwall
(symmetric cross)

Flag of Saint David of Wales
(symmetric cross)

Flag of Greece (1822–1978)

Flag of the Kingdom of Iberia

Citizen of the World Flag (George Dibbern)

Flag of Georgia
(Jerusalem Cross)

Flag of Sardinia
(Saint George's Cross and four Moors' heads)

Flag of Dominica

Flag of the Dominican Republic

Flag of the Principality of Mingrelia

Flag of Finland
(Nordic cross)

Flag of Stavropol Krai
(Nordic cross)

Flag of Ingria
(Nordic cross)

Flag of Denmark
(Nordic cross)

Flag of Norway
(Nordic cross)

Flag of Sweden
(Nordic cross)

Flag of Iceland
(Nordic cross)

Flag of the Puerto Rican Independence Party

Flag of the State of the Teutonic Order

Saint Patrick's Saltire

Flag of Scotland
(Saltire / Saint Andrew's Cross)

Battle flag of the Confederate States

Flag of Cross of Burgundy
(ragged/saw-toothed saltire)

Flag of the Achterhoek

Flag of the United Kingdom

Flag of the Basque Country, Spain

Flag of Novorossiya

Flag of Switzerland (Greek cross)

Flag of Occitania
(Occitan cross and Felibritge star)

Flag of Asturias
(Victory Cross)

== Pall ==
Examples:

Flag of South Africa

Flag of Vanuatu

Flag of St. Louis, Missouri, USA

Flag of Tuva, Russian Federation

Flag of Sosnowiec

Flag of Acadiana, Louisiana, United States (party per pall)

Flag of the Czech Republic (party per pall)

Flag of Sint Maarten, Netherlands (party per pall)

Flag of Djibouti (party per pall)

Flag of the Philippines (party per pall)

Flag of Westchester County, New York (state), United States (party per pall)

== Pile ==
Examples:

Flag of American Samoa, United States (hoist-pointing pile throughout)

Flag of Antigua and Barbuda (down-pointing pile)

Flag of the Bahamas

Flag of the Catalan independence movement

Flag of the Comoros

Flag of Cuba

Flag of Eritrea (pile throughout)

Flag of Equatorial Guinea

Flag of Guyana (pile with arrowhead forming a pile throughout)

Flag of Hoek, Terneuzen, Zeeland, Netherlands

Flag of Palestine

Flag of Puerto Rico, United States

Flag of São Tomé and Príncipe

Proposed flag of Savoie, Auvergne-Rhône-Alpes, France (down-pointing pile)

Flag of South Sudan

Flag of Sudan

Flag of Timor-Leste (pile with arrowhead)

== Chevron ==
Examples:

Progress pride flag (multiple hoist chevrons)

Flag of North American Vexillological Association (down-pointing chevron)

== Side ==
examples:

Flag of Pakistan (charged green field with hoistward side)

Flag of Madagascar (bicolour with hoist stripe)

Flag of Guinea Bissau (bicolour with charged hoist stripe)

Flag of Texas (bicolour with charged hoist stripe), United States

Flag of Benin (bicolour with hoist stripe)

Flag of Belarus (bicolour with hoist stripe)

Flag of the United Arab Emirates (tricolour with hoist stripe)

Flag of Oman (tricolour with charged hoist stripe)

Flag of Valencia
(bicolour striped field with a charged hoist band)

== Canton ==
Examples:

Christian Flag

British White Ensign

British Red Ensign

Flag of Samoa

Flag of the Republic of China (Taiwan)

Flag of Tonga

Flag of Bermuda, United Kingdom

Esperanto flag

British Blue Ensign (see also: Flags based on British ensigns on Wikimedia Commons)

Flag of Fiji

Flag of Saint Helena, United Kingdom

Flag of Chile

Flag of Georgia, United States

Flag of Bahia, Brazil

Flag of 's-Hertogenbosch, North Brabant, Netherlands

Flag of Togo

Flag of Abkhazia

Flag of Uruguay

Flag of Brittany, France

Flag of Greece

Flag of Liberia

Flag of the British Indian Ocean Territory, United Kingdom

Flag of São Paulo, Brazil

Flag of Brazil (1889)

Flag of the United States

Flag of Malaysia

Flag of the Second Vermont Republic

Unofficial flag of New England, United States

Flag of the Soviet Union (1923–1924)

Flag of the Democratic Republic of Georgia

Flag of the Kingdom of Lithuania

== Border ==
Examples:

Flag of Sint Eustatius
— a fimbriated red border
(a constituent 'public body' island of the Caribbean Netherlands within the Kingdom of the Netherlands)

Royal Banner of Scotland
— a red double orle border with a motif of alternating heraldic lilies, fleurs-de-lys
(historically, the royal standard of the Kingdom of Scotland)

Flag of Sri Lanka
— a golden border

Flag of Tibet
— a fimbriated yellow border on three sides of "the Snow Lion Flag"
(1914→1951 and its use is continued by the Tibetan government-in-exile based in Dharamshala, Himachal Pradesh, India)

Flag of the Republic of Venice / The Banner of Saint Mark the Evangelist
— an extravagantly decorated orle border with insets of the Madonna and Child with Christian saints
(La Serenissima / Stato da Màr — 697→1797)

Flag of Venice
— a simplified variation of the Banner of Saint Mark, but still highly decorated orle bordered with insets of the Madonna and Child with Christian saints
(from 1997 — the City of Venice)

Naval Jack of Argentina

Flag of Grenada

Flag of Guam

Flag of Montenegro

Flag of Maldives

Flag of Terengganu, Malaysia

Flag of the Kingdom of the Two Sicilies

Flag of Wyoming, United States

Flag of the United States of the Ionian Islands

Flag of Nepal

Flag of the Community of Portuguese Language Countries

Flag of the Western Union

== Shape ==
=== Circle or sphere ===
Examples:

Flag of Brazil

Flag of Europe

Flag of the Supreme Court of Brazil

Flag of India

Flag of Japan

Flag of Bangladesh

Flag of South Korea

Flag of North Korea

Australian Aboriginal Flag

Flag of Palau

Flag of the Vietnamese National Party

Flag of Niger

Flag of Laos

Flag of Ethiopia

Flag of NATO

Flag of ASEAN

Flag of the Eurasian Economic Union

Flag of the Community of Portuguese Language Countries

Flag of the Commonwealth of Independent States

Flag of ECOWAS

Flag of the Caribbean Community

Flag of the Organization of American States

Flag of Mars (Thomas O. Paine)

Flag of the Gulf Cooperation Council

Flag of OPEC

Flag of the Organisation of African, Caribbean and Pacific States

Flag of the Southern African Development Community

Flag of the African and Malagasy Union

Flag of Nazi Germany

Flag of the Central American Integration System

Flag of Earth (Tijs Bonekamp)

Citizen of the World Flag (George Dibbern)

Flag of Earth (James W. Cadle)

Flag of the World Service Authority

Flag of the International Security Assistance Force

Flag of the Resolute Support Mission

Flag of North Macedonia

Flag of Mongolia

Flag of Portugal

Flag of Tehreek-e-Nafaz-e-Shariat-e-Mohammadi

Flag of Jama'at al-Tawhid wal-Jihad

Flag of the Islamic State

Flag of the Kosovo Police

Flag of the President of Kosovo

=== Diamond ===
Examples:

Flag of Saba (island)

Flag of Mato Grosso, Brazil

Flag of the Kingdom of Italy (1805–1814)

Flag of Arkansas, United States

Flag of Brazil

Flag of Antarctica (True South)

Flag of the Republic of the Rif

Flag of Hamburger SV

Flag of the Red Crystal

Flag of Yokohama, Japan

Flag of the Forest Finns

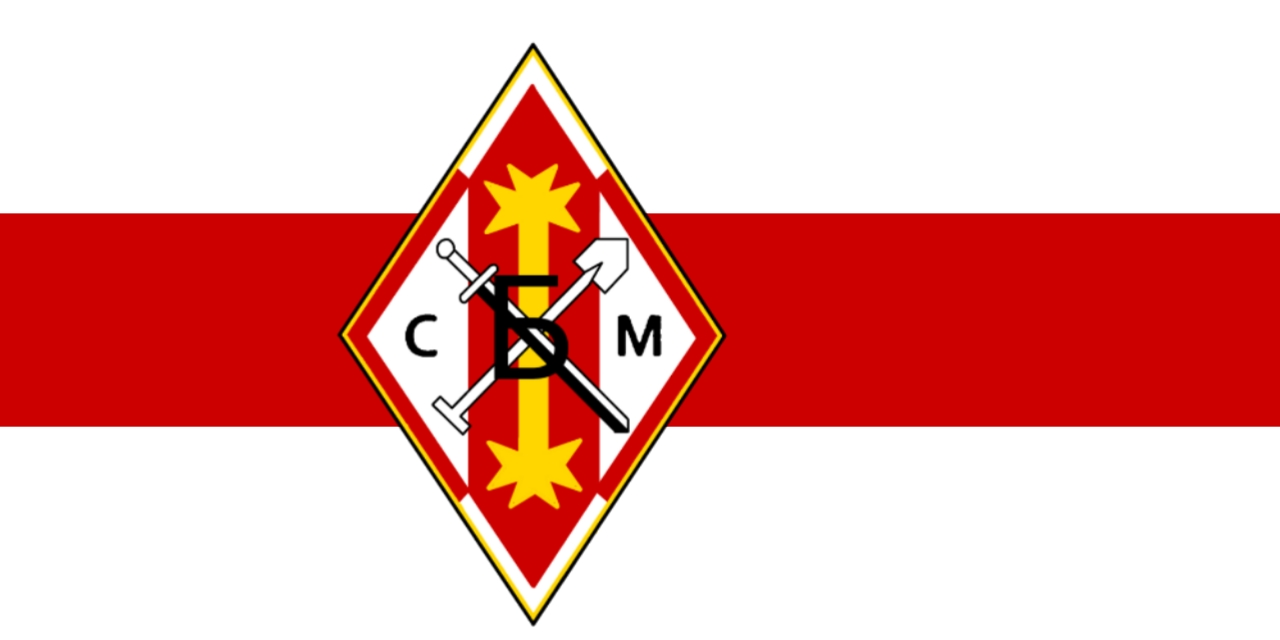
Flag of the Union of Belarusian Youth

Flag of Saint Vincent and the Grenadines

Flag of Amapá

Civil ensign of Monaco (lozengy)

Flag of Bavaria (bendy lozengy)

=== Spiral ===
Examples:

the national Māori flag

Flag of Ottawa

Flag of Ibaraki Prefecture

=== Square ===
Examples:

Flag of Haiti (1820–1849, 1859–1964)

Flag of the White Tai (square in flag)

ICS flag sierra (square in flag)

Storm warning flag (USA)

Flag of the Almohad Caliphate

Wiphala (square flag)

The checkered flag

Flag of North Brabant (Netherlands), chequered flag

Flag of Antwerp Province (Belgium), chequered flag

Flag of Chile (square canton)

Flag of Croatia

Flag of the Organization for Security and Co-operation in Europe

=== Trapezoid ===
Examples:

Flag of Kuwait

Flag of Aden (1963–1967)

Flag of J. Lauritzen A/S

Flag of Antigua and Barbuda

=== Triangle ===
Examples:

Flag of Saint Lucia

Flag of Bahia, Brazil

Flag of Minas Gerais, Brazil

Flag of Magnitogorsk

Proposal for a Flag of Europe (1951)

United States Coast and Geodetic Survey (1899-1970)

Lesbian pride flag

Flag of Salinas, Puerto Rico

Flag of Bosnia and Herzegovina

Flag of Nicaragua

Flag of El Salvador

== Living organism ==
=== Animal ===
Examples:

Flag of Albania (double-headed eagle)

Flag of Antarctica (Joanne Cooper and Stefan Tucker) (penguin)

Flag of Berlin, Germany (bear)

Flag of Bhutan (Druk)

Flag of Buckinghamshire, England (Bohun swan)

Flag of California, United States (grizzly bear)

Flag of Croatia (three lion's heads, goat, marten)

Flag of Dominica (sisserou parrot)

Flag of the Donetsk People's Republic (October 2014 – 2017) (double-headed eagle)

Flag of Ecuador (condor)

Flag of Egypt (eagle)

Flag of Fiji (lion and dove)

Flag of Flanders, Belgium (lion)

Flag of Guatemala (resplendent quetzal)

Flag of Kazakhstan (steppe eagle)

Flag of Kherson Oblast (double-headed eagle)

Flag of the Kingdom of Lithuania (horse)

Flag of Louisiana, United States (pelican)

Flag of the Luhansk People's Republic (May 10 – October 2014) (double-headed eagle)

Flag of the Luhansk People's Republic (October 2014 – 2017) (horse)

Flag of Mexico (golden eagle and snake)

Flag of Moldova (aurochs and eagle)

Flag of Montenegro (double-headed eagle)

Flag of the Nordic Council (swan)

Flag of Normandy (two lions)

Flag of Olsztyn (sea shell)

Flag of Papua New Guinea (bird-of-paradise)

Flag of Pennsylvania, United States (bald eagle and horses)

Flag of the Principality of Moldavia (aurochs)

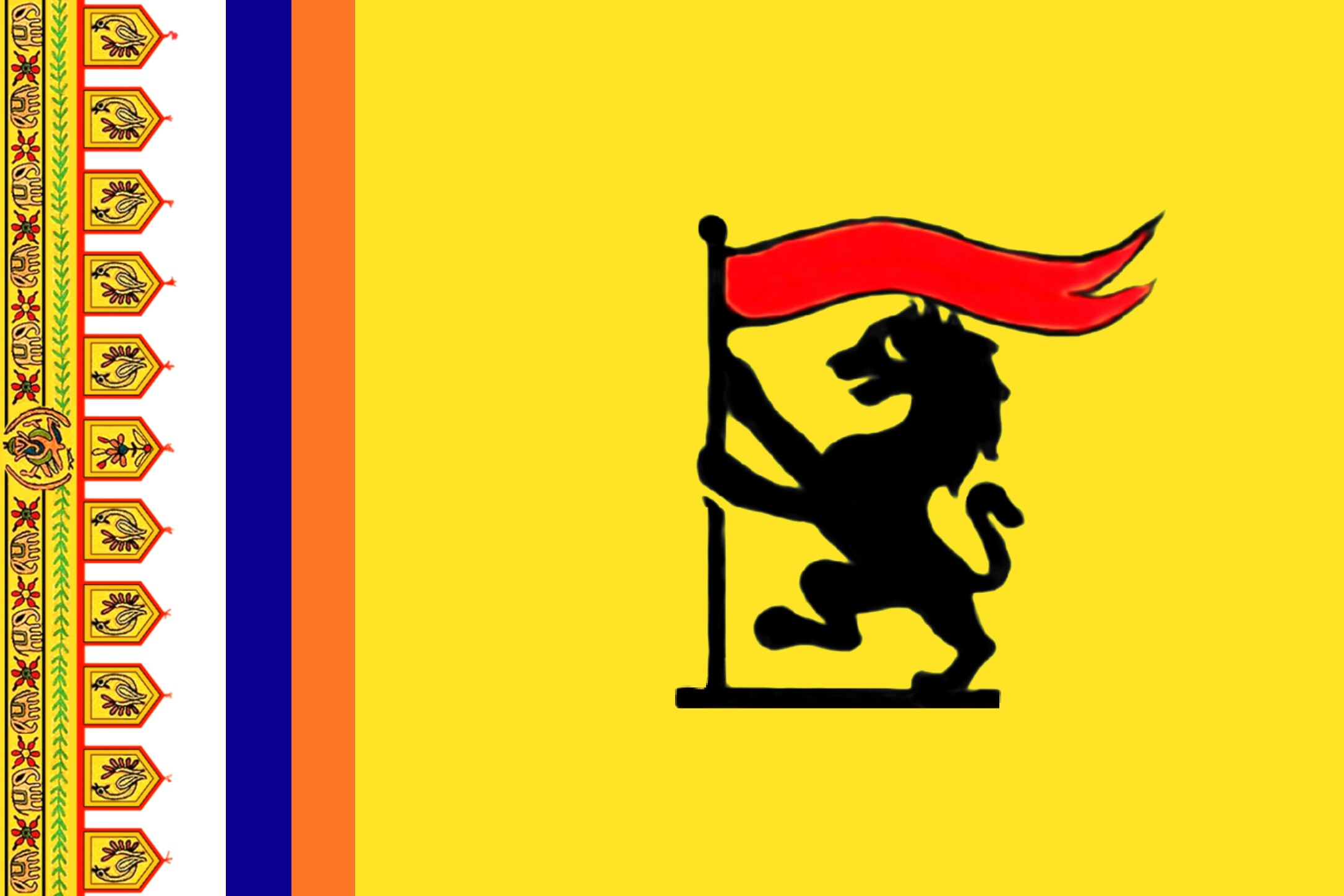
Flag of Saurashtra (horse)

Flag of Serbia (double-headed eagle)

Flag of Spain (lion)

Flag of Sri Lanka (lion)

Flag of Tsurui, Hokkaido (stylized red-crowned crane)

Flag of Tuscany, Italy (pegasus)

Flag of Uganda (Grey crowned crane)

Flag of Veneto, Italy (Lion of Saint Mark)

Flag of Wales (Welsh dragon)

Flag of Wallonia, Belgium (rooster)

Flag of Warwickshire, England (bear)

Flag of Zheleznogorsk, Russia (bear)

Flag of Zambia (eagle)

Flag of Zimbabwe (Zimbabwe Bird)

=== Animal part ===
Examples:

International Bear Brotherhood Flag (bear paw)

Flag of Johnston Atoll (bird head)

Flag of Brunei (bird wing)

=== Person or body part ===
Examples:

Flag of Sardinia (four Moor's heads and Saint George's Cross)

Flag of Corsica (Moor's head)

Flag of the Isle of Man (human leg)

Flag of Sicily (human leg and head)

Flag of New Jersey, United States (Liberty and Ceres)

Flag of Ulster (hand)

Flag of Benin Empire (people)

Flag of Belize (people)

Flag of Abkhazia (hand)

Flag of Penza Oblast (2002–2022) (Jesus)

Flag of Washington, United States (George Washington)

Flag of the Canton of Glarus, Switzerland (Saint Fridolin)

Jolly Roger of the Republic of Pirates

Flag of Brunei (hand)

Flag of Antarctica (Whitney Smith) (hand)

Mohawk Warrior Flag (head)

Flag of the Donetsk People's Republic (October 2014 – 2017) (angel)

Flag of the Kingdom of Lithuania (person)

Flag of the World Service Authority (person)

=== Plant ===
Examples:

Flag of the Islamic Republic of Afghanistan (2013–2021) (ears of wheat

Flag of Boyacá Department (oak leaves)

Flag of Canada (maple leaf)

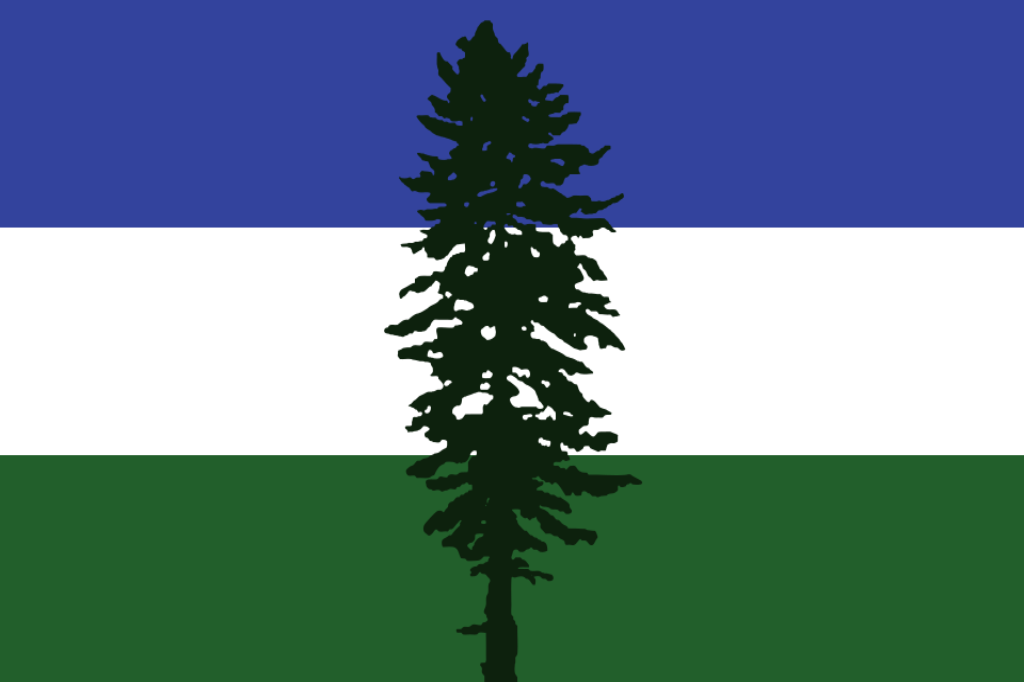
Flag of Cascadia (Douglas fir tree)

Flag of Cyprus (olive branches)

Flag of El Salvador (laurel wreath)

Flag of Equatorial Guinea (silk-cotton tree)

Flag of Eritrea (olive branches)

Flag of Fiji (coconut palm, sugarcane, banana bunch)

Flag of Guatemala (laurel wreath)

Flag of Guam (coconut tree)

Flag of Haiti (palm tree)

Flag of Hong Kong (bauhinia blakeana)

Flag of the Haudenosaunee Confederacy (eastern white pine)

Imperial standard (flag) the Emperor of Japan (1869→present — a gold 16-petal chrysanthemum)

Flag of Kalmykia (lotus)

Flag of Lebanon (cedar)

Lockwood silver fern flag (Silver fern)

Flag of Macau (lotus)

Flag of Mississippi (southern magnolia)

Flag of Norfolk Island, Australia (Norfolk Island pine)

Flag of Quebec (fleur-de-lis)

Flag of the United Nations (olive branches)

Flag of Paraguay ( palm branch and olive branch)

Flag of Moldova (flower)

Flag of the Dominican Republic (bay laurel and palm frond)

Flag of Belize (wreath and mahogany tree)

Flag of Pennsylvania, United States (wheat sheaves, olive branch, and cornstalk)

Flag of the Arab League (olive branch)

Flag of ASEAN (a sheaf of ten rice/paddy stalks)

Flag of the International Criminal Court (olive branch)

Unofficial flag of New England (pine tree)

Flag of Eritrea (1952–1961) (olive branches)

Flag of the European Parliament (until 1983) (olive branches)

Flag of Kherson Oblast (oak branches)

Flag of the Luhansk People's Republic (October 2014 – 2017) (sunflower)

Flag of the Soviet Union (30 December 1922 – 12 November 1923) (ears of wheat)

Flag of the Principality of Moldavia (flower)

== Object ==
=== Anchor, boat, or ship ===
Examples:

Flag of Anchorage, Alaska, United States (an anchor)

Flag of Belize

Flag of British Antarctic Territory (R.S.S. Discovery barque-rigged auxiliary steamship as the crest of the coat or arms)

Flag of Bermuda (the wreck of the Sea Venture)

Flag of Caithness, Scotland (a lymphad ship / galley)

Flag of the Central Commission for the Navigation of the Rhine (anchor)

Flag of French Polynesia (a Polynesian sailing canoe)

Flag of Ecuador (steamboat)

Flag of Guam (a proa)

Flag of Pennsylvania, United States

Flag of Rhode Island, United States (an anchor)

Flag of New Brunswick (a lymphad ship / galley)

Flag of New Hampshire (the USS Raleigh sailing frigate)

Flag of New York State, United States (a masted ship and a sloop)

Flag of Quebec City (the Don de Dieu galleon)

Flag of Saint Helena (a three-masted ship with its sails furled and the flag of England as its ensign)

Flag of Saint Pierre and Miquelon (the Grande Hermine carrack)

Flag of Tokelau (a Polynesian sailing canoe)

=== Book ===
Flag of the Dominican Republic (Gospel of John)

Flag of Mozambique

Flag of San Ġwann

Flag of Venice (Gospel of Mark)

=== Building ===
Examples:

Flag of the Islamic Republic of Afghanistan (2013–2021) (a mosque)

Flag of Cambodia (Angkor Wat)

Flag of Durban, South Africa (City Hall dome)

Flag of the Isle of Wight Council, UK (Carisbrooke Castle)

Flag of Toronto, Canada (Toronto City Hall)

Standard of Prince Philip, Duke of Edinburgh (castle)

Flag of the Organisation of Islamic Cooperation (the Kaaba)

Flag of UNESCO

Flag of Gibraltar, United Kingdom (castle)

=== Chair ===
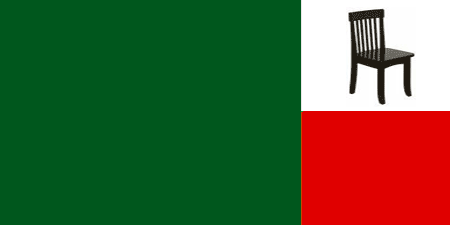
Flag of Uttarakhand Kranti Dal

=== Headgear ===
Examples:

State Ensign of Belgium (crown)

Flag of Spain (royal crown)

State Flag of Hungary (Crown of Saint Stephen)

Flag of Vatican City (Papal Tiara)

Personal Flag of Queen Elizabeth II (crown)

Flag of the governor of Southern Rhodesia (1951–1970) (crown)

Flag of Lesotho (mokorotlo)

Flag of Liechtenstein (crown)

Flag of Croatia (crown)

Flag of Kherson Oblast (Imperial Crown)

Flag of Navarre, Spain (Spanish Royal Crown)

=== Flag ===
Examples:

South African Prinsevlag (1928–1994) (flags of the United Kingdom, Orange Free State, and Transvaal)

Flag of Georgia, United States (2001–2003) (1777 Flag of the United States, traditional, 1920, and 1956 Georgia flags, and current U.S. flag)

Flag of Australia (British flag)

Flag of the Cook Islands (British flag)

Flag of New Zealand (British flag)

Flag of Niue (British flag)

Flag of Haiti (six vertically hoisted Haitian flags)

Flag of Saint Pierre and Miquelon, France (Basque, Breton, and Norman flags)

Flag of Tuvalu (Union Jack in canton)

Flag of Fiji (Union Jack)

Flag of El Salvador (five vertically hoisted Salvadoran flags)

Flag of Ecuador (four vertically hoisted Ecuadorian flags)

Flag of Brunei (swallowtail flag)

Flag of the Organization of American States

Flag of Nevis (Saint Kitts and Nevis flag)

Flag of the Kingdom of Georgia (the Five-Cross Flag of Georgia)

Flag of Earth (Paul Carroll)

Flag of the Islamic Republic of Afghanistan (2013–2021)

Flag of Fatah

Flag of the Popular Front for the Liberation of Palestine – General Command

=== Hill, mountain, or rock ===
Examples:

Flag of Bohol (Chocolate Hills)

Flag of Bukidnon, Philippines (Kitanglad mountain range)

Flag of Slovakia (Tatra, Mátra and Fatra)

Flag of Slovenia (Triglav)

Flag of Roswell, New Mexico, United States (El Capitan)

Flag of Sabah, Malaysia (Mount Kinabalu)

Flag of Shizuoka Prefecture (Mount Fuji)

Flag of Sint Eustatius (The Quill)

Flag of Utah, United States (Snowy Peaks and Red Rock Canyons)

Flag of Nicaragua

Flag of El Salvador

Flag of Ecuador (Chimborazo)

Flag of Nevis (Nevis Peak)

=== Map ===
Examples:

Flag of the African and Malagasy Union

Flag of the African Union

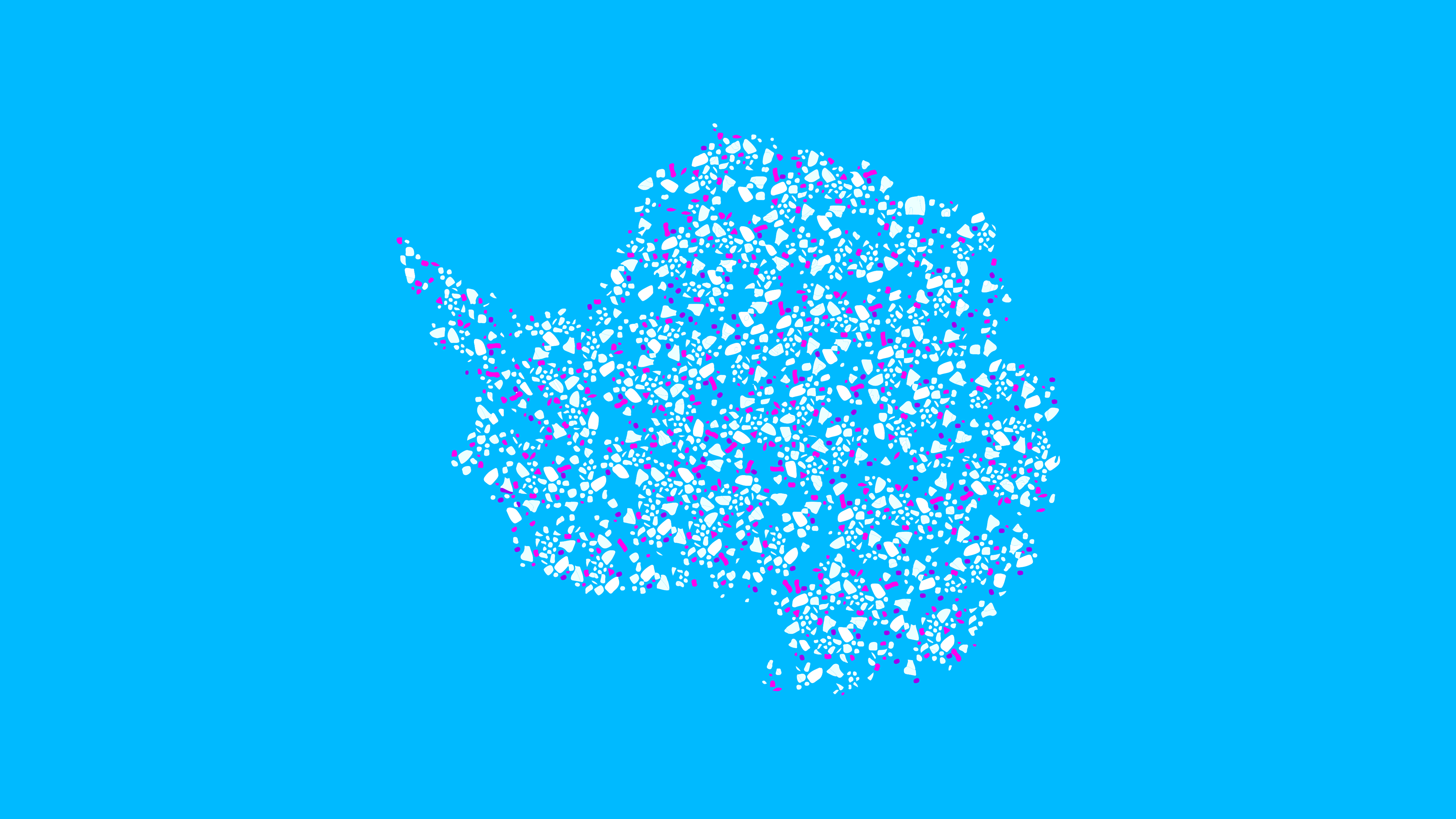
Flag of Antarctica (Graham Bartram's 2024 redesign)

Flag of Antarctica (Graham Bartram)

Flag of Antarctica (Joanne Cooper and Stefan Tucker)

Flag of Bangladesh (1971)

Flag of the President of Belarus

Flag of Bosnia and Herzegovina (abstract)

Flag of Cambodia (1992–1993)

Flag of the Central American Integration System

Flag of Christmas Island

Flag of Cyprus

Flag of Earth (Paul Carroll)

Flag of ECOWAS

Flag of the Eurasian Economic Union

Flag of the territorial collectivity of French Guiana

Flag of the Gulf Cooperation Council

Flag of Kosovo

Presidential standard of Madagascar

Flag of Minnesota, United States (abstract)

Flag of the North Province, New Caledonia, France

Flag of the Organisation of African Unity

Flag of Sakhalin Oblast

Flag of São Paulo, Brazil (state)

Flag of Veraguas, Panama

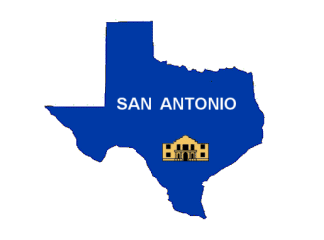
Flag of San Antonio, Texas, United States (1917–1976)

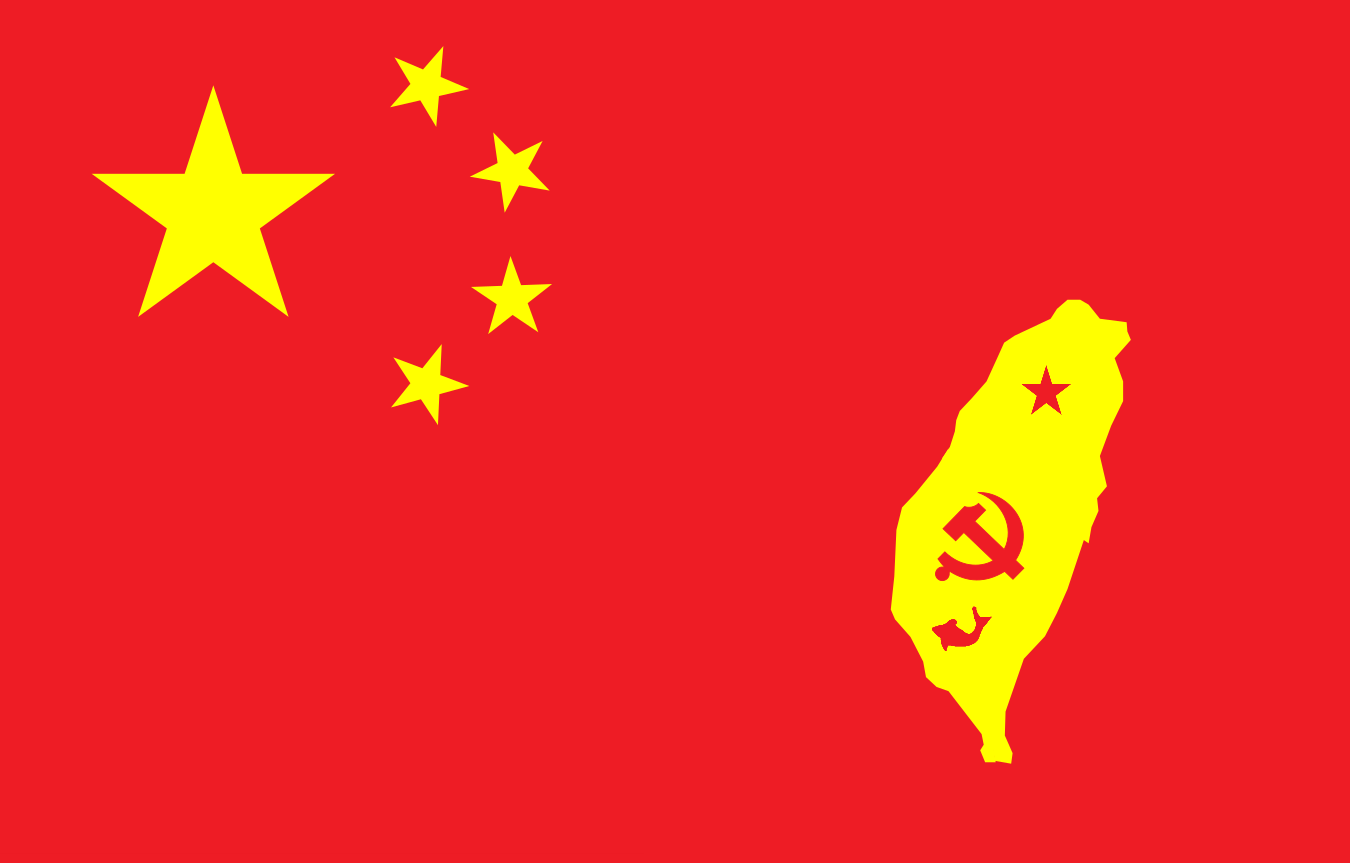
Flag of the Taiwan People's Communist Party

Flag of Unified Korea

Flag of the United Nations

=== Machine, tool, or instrument ===
Examples:

Flag of Angola (machete and cog wheel)

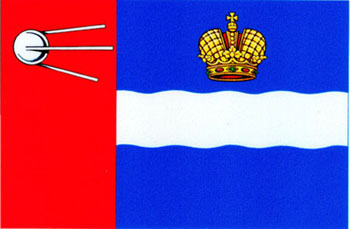
Flag of Kaluga, Russia
(satellite)

Flag of Portugal
(armillary sphere)

Presidential Standard of Ireland (harp)

Flag of the Canton of Geneva, Switzerland (key)

Flag of Mozambique (Firearm and hoe)

Flag of the Soviet Union (hammer and sickle)

Flag of Azad Hind (loom)

Flag of East Germany (hammer and compass)

Flag of Myanmar (1974–2010) (cog wheel)

Flag of the Tooro Kingdom (drum)

Flag of the Romani people (wheel)

Flag of Jammu and Kashmir (1952–2019) (plough)

Flag of India (Ashoka Chakra)

Flag of Brunei (parasol)

Flag of Belize (tools of woodcutter)

Flag of Transnistria (hammer and sickle)

Flag of Pennsylvania, United States (plough)

Flag of the Arab League (chain)

Flag of the Commonwealth of Nations (globe)

Flag of the Organisation of Islamic Cooperation (globe)

Flag of ECOWAS (drum)

Flag of the Western Union (chain)

Flag of the Soviet Union (30 December 1922 – 12 November 1923) (globe)

Flag of the Ukrainian Soviet Socialist Republic (hammer and sickle)

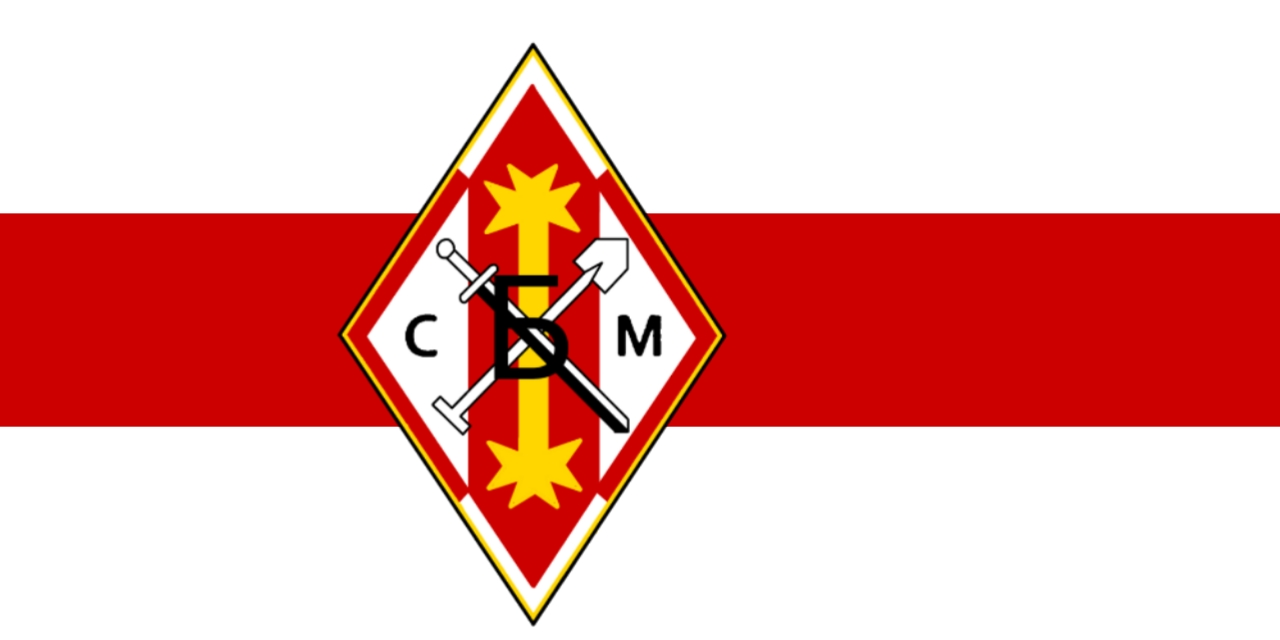
Flag of the Union of Belarusian Youth (shovel)

Flag of the Kazakh SSR and Kazakhstan (1953–1992) (hammer and sickle)

Flag of the Kirghiz SSR and Kyrgystan (1952–1992) (hammer and sickle)

Flag of Gibraltar, United Kingdom (key)

Flag of Navarre, Spain (chain)

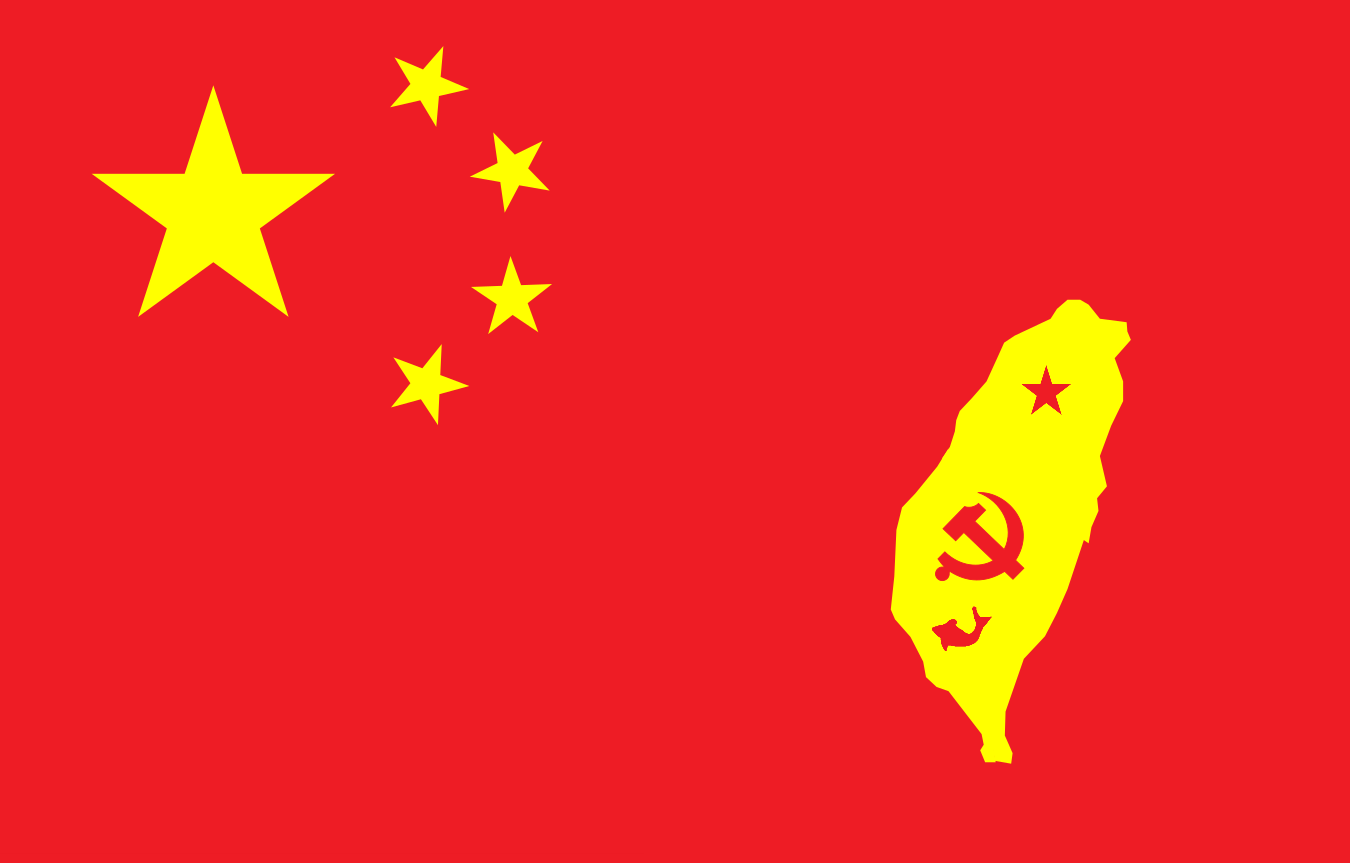
Flag of the Taiwan People's Communist Party (hammer and sickle)

Flag of the Palestinian Communist Party (hammer and sickle)

=== Shield or weapon ===
Examples:

Flag of Saudi Arabia (sword)

Flag of Bangsamoro (kris)

Flag of Bukidnon, Philippines (spear and shield)

Flag of Iran (machete and four crescents)

Flag of Essex, England (seax)

Flag of the Brazilian Empire (shield)

Flag of Guatemala (rifle)

Flag of Kenya (shield and spears)

Flag of Mozambique (AK-47)

Flag of Eswatini (shield and spears)

Flag of Oklahoma, United States (buffalo-skin shield)

Flag of the United States Virgin Islands (arrows)

Flag of Barbados (trident)

Flag of the Dominican Republic (spears)

Flag of Oman (dagger and two swords)

Flag of the European Gendarmerie Force

Flag of the Donetsk People's Republic (October 2014 – 2017) (sword and shield)

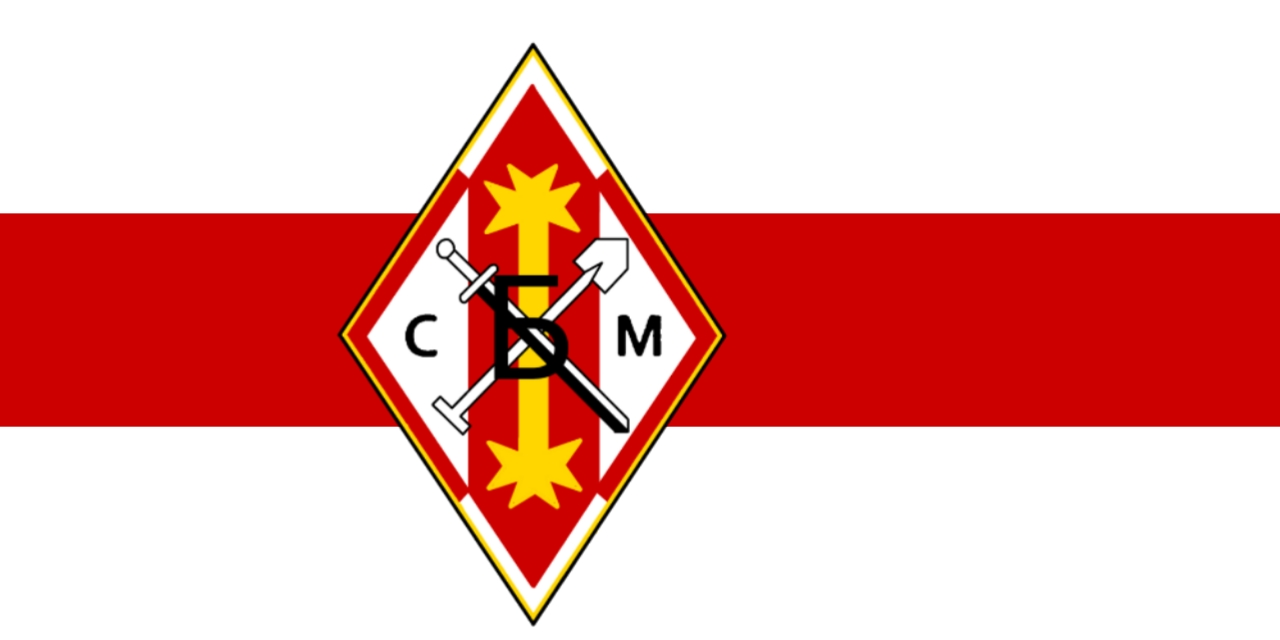
Flag of the Union of Belarusian Youth (sword)

Flag of the Principality of Samtskhe (sword)

Flag of the Kingdom of Lithuania (sword and shield)

== Astronomical object ==
=== Star ===
Flag of Abkhazia

Flag of the African Union

Flag of Algeria

Flag of Australia

Flag of Amazonas, North Region, Brazil

Assyrian flag (white 4-pointed star)

Flag of the Azerbaijan Democratic Republic

Flag of Bosnia and Herzegovina

Flag of Burkina Faso

Flag of Cameroon

Flag of Cape Verde

Flag of the Catalan independence movement

Flag of the Central African Republic

Flag of the Central Commission for the Navigation of the Rhine

Flag of Chicago, Illinois, United States

Flag of Chile

Flag of the People's Republic of China

Flag of Comecon

Flag of the Community of Madrid, Spain (white 5-pointed stars)

Flag of the Comoros

Flag of the Cook Islands

Flag of Cuba

Flag of Djibouti

Flag of Dominica

Flag of the Democratic Front for the Liberation of Palestine

Flag of the Democratic Republic of the Congo

Citizen of the World Flag (George Dibbern)

Flag of Earth (James William van Kirk)

Flag of the East African Community (1967–1977)

Flag of the East Turkestan independence movement

Flag of Ethiopia (pentagram)

Flag of Europe

Flag of the European Coal and Steel Community

Flag of the European Maritime Force

Flag of the Galician independence movement

Flag of Grenada

Flag of Ghana

Flag of Guinea-Bissau

Flag of Honduras

Flag of Indiana, United States

Flag of the Iskolat

Flag of Israel (blue 6-pointed star – Star of David)

Flag of Jordan

Flag of the Kazakh SSR and Kazakhstan (1953–1992)

Flag of Kosovo

Flag of the Kosovo Security Force

Flag of the Kirghiz SSR and Kyrgystan (1952–1992) (hammer and sickle)

Flag of the League of Nations

Flag of Liberia

Lockwood silver fern flag

Flag of the Luhansk People's Republic (October 2014 – 2017)

Flag of the Luhansk People's Republic (2017)

Flag of Mars (Thomas O. Paine)

Flag of Mauritania

Flag of Micronesia

Flag of Minnesota, United States (Polaris)

Flag of Morocco (pentagram)

Flag of Mozambique

Flag of Myanmar

Flag of Niue

Flag of North Korea

Flag of Northern Cyprus

Flag of the Musavat Party of Turkic Federalists

Flag of the Organization of Turkic States

Flag of Pakistan (five point star)

Flag of Panama

Flag of the Philippines

Flag of Portland, Oregon, United States (white 4-pointed star)

Flag of Puerto Rico

Flag of the Republic of Aras

Flag of the Republic of West Papua

Flag of the Principality of Moldavia

Flag of São Tomé and Príncipe

Flag of the Second Vermont Republic

Flag of Senegal

Flag of Singapore

Flag of Solomon Islands

Flag of Somalia

Flag of Somaliland

Flag of Suriname

Flag of the Red Army of the Soviet Union (fimbriated red 5-pointed star)

Flag of Syria

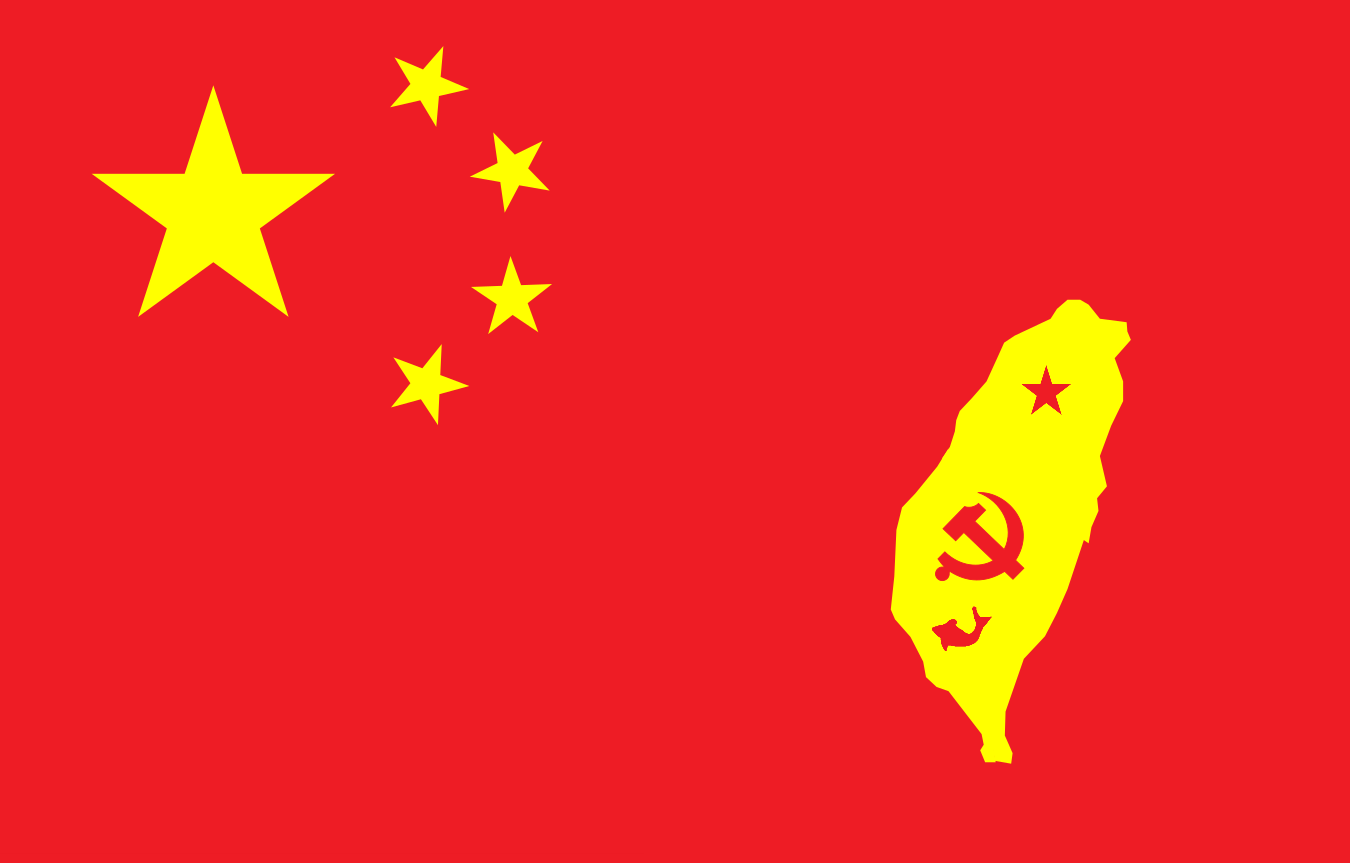
Flag of the Taiwan People's Communist Party

Flag of Tajikistan

Flag of Texas, United States (white 5-pointed star)

Flag of Transnistria

Flag of the Trust Territory of the Pacific Islands

Flag of Tuvalu

Flag of the Ukrainian Soviet Socialist Republic

Flag of the Union of African States

Flag of the United States

Flag of Uzbekistan

Flag of Venezuela (8 arched 5 pointed stars)

Flag of Vietnam

Flag of the Western European Union

Flag of Western Sahara

=== Sun ===
Flag of Antigua and Barbuda (rising sun)

Flag of Argentina (Sun of May)

Australian Aboriginal Flag

Flag of Bangladesh

Flag of British Columbia (setting sun)

Flag of the Commonwealth of Independent States

Flag of Colorado, United States

Flag of Cusco

Flag of Ecuador

Flag of Greenland (rising/setting midnight sun)

Flag of Japan

Flag of Kiribati (rising sun)

Flag of Kurdistan

Flag of Kyrgyzstan

Flag of Kazakhstan

Flag of the Luhansk People's Republic (October 2014 – 2017)

Flag of Macedonia (Vergina Sun)

Flag of Malawi (rising sun)

Mohawk Warrior Flag (sun)

Flag of Mongolia (sun and moon)

Flag of Namibia

Flag of New Mexico, United States (Zia sun)

Flag of North Macedonia (Vergina Sun variant)

Flag of the Organization of Turkic States

Flag of Orlando, Florida, United States (rising/setting sun)

Flag of Pernambuco, Brazil

Flag of the Philippines

Flag of Rwanda

Flag of the Soviet Union (30 December 1922 – 12 November 1923)

Flag of South Dakota, United States

Flag of the Republic of China (Taiwan)

Flag of the Talysh-Mughan Autonomous Republic

Flag of Tocantins, Brazil

Flag of Uruguay (Sun of May)

=== Crescent moon ===
Examples:

Flag of Algeria (crescent facing single five pointed star)

Flag of the Arab League

Flag of Azerbaijan (crescent facing single star)

Flag of the Azerbaijan Democratic Republic

Flag of Brunei

Flag of the Comoros (crescent and four stars)

Flag of Croatia

Flag of the East Turkestan independence movement (crescent and single star)

Flag of Libya (crescent facing single star)

Flag of Malaysia (crescent facing a 14-point star)

Flag of Maldives

Flag of Mauritania (crescent and single star)

Flag of Mongolia (crescent and sun)

Flag of Nepal (crescent and sun)

Flag of Northern Cyprus (crescent and star)

Flag of the Musavat Party of Turkic Federalists (crescent and star)

Flag of the Organisation of Islamic Cooperation

Flag of the Organization of Turkic States (crescent facing single eight pointed star)

Flag of Pakistan (crescent facing single five pointed star)

Flag of the Principality of Moldavia

Flag of the Republic of Aras

Flag of Singapore (crescent and five stars)

Flag of Tunisia (crescent facing single star)

Flag of Turkey (crescent facing single star)

Flag of Turkmenistan (crescent and five stars)

Flag of Uzbekistan (crescent and twelve stars)

Flag of Western Sahara (crescent facing single star)

=== Constellation ===
Flag of Alaska, United States (Big Dipper and Polaris)

Flag of Antarctica (Dave Hamilton) (Crux)

Flag of Australia (Crux)

Flag of Brazil (several constellations)

Flag of Mercosur (Crux)

Flag of New Zealand (Crux)

Flag of Samoa (Crux)

=== Planet or moon ===
Flag of Antarctica (Whitney Smith) (southern section of Earth)

Flag of Laos (Moon)

Flag of Mars (Thomas O. Paine) (Earth, Mars, and star)

Flag of Palau (Moon)

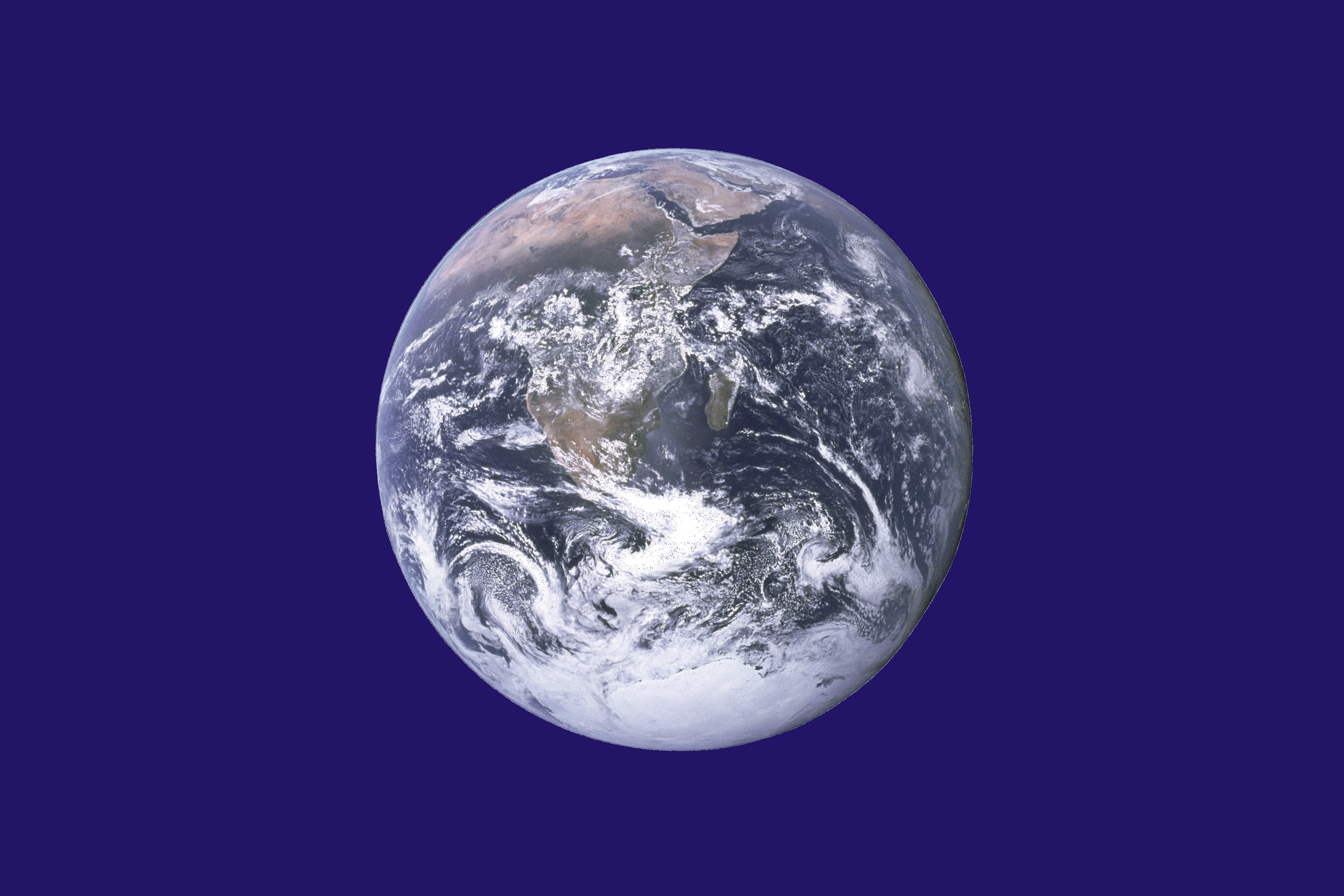
Flag of Earth (John McConnell) (Earth)

== Inscription ==
Examples:

Flag of Ethiopia (1897–1913) (Geʽez)

Flag of the Islamic Emirate of Afghanistan (Arabic)

Flag of Iraq (Arabic)

Flag of Saudi Arabia (Arabic)

Flag of Russian SFSR (1918–1920) (Cyrillic)

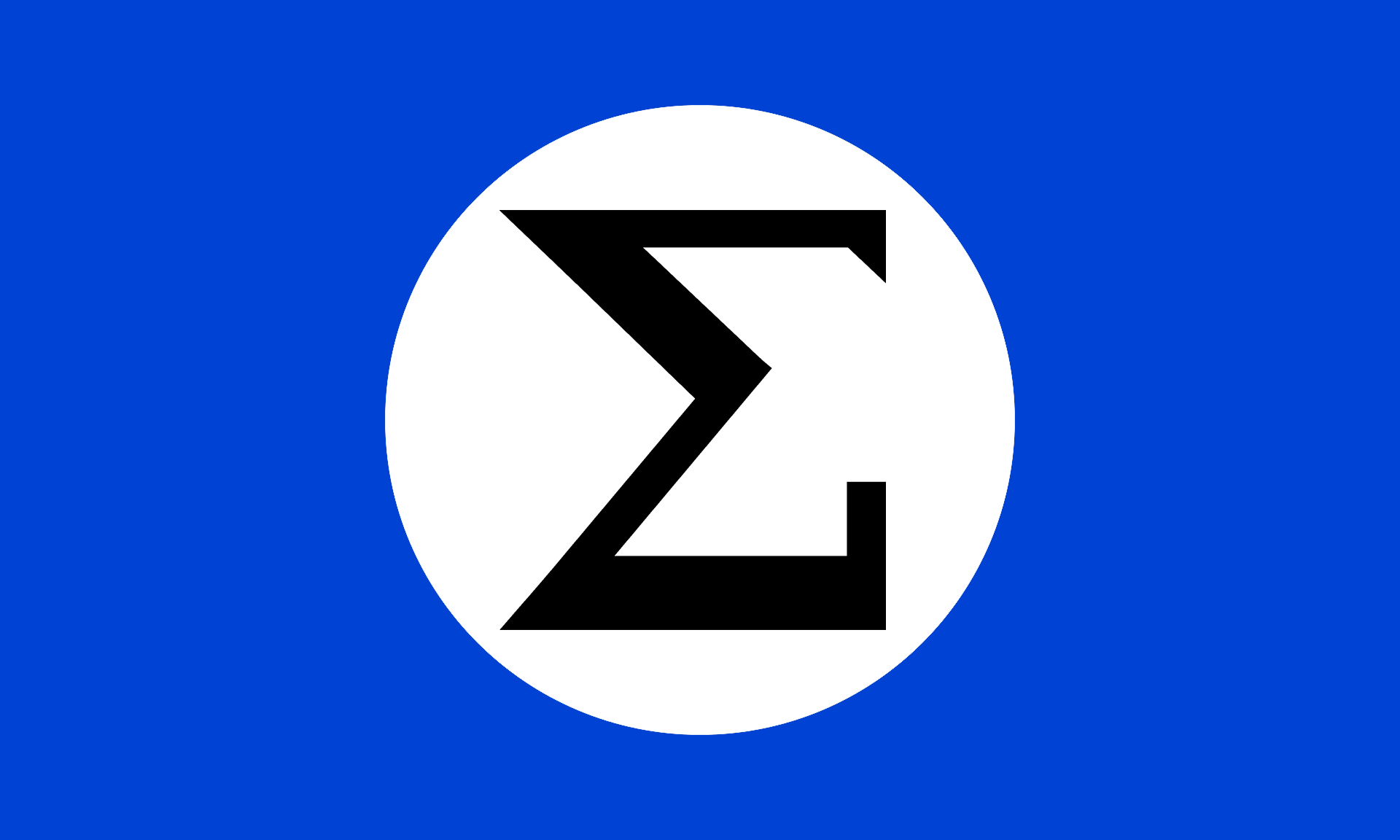
Flag of the Brazilian Integralist Action (1932–1937) (Greek)

Flag of the Lanfang Republic (1777–1884) (Hanzi)

Flag of Jerusalem, Israel (Hebrew)

Flag of Righteous Army, Japan (Kanji)

Flag of Rwanda (1962–2001) (Latin)

Flag of Dutch East India Company (Latin)

Flag of Arkansas, United States (Latin)

Flag of Paraíba, Brazil (Latin)

Flag of Brazil (Latin)

Flag of Paraguay (Latin)

Flag of Espírito Santo, Brazil (Latin)

Flag of the Mongolian Armed Forces (Mongolian)

Flag of the Islamic Republic of Afghanistan (2013–2021) (Arabic)

== See also ==
- Vexillology
- Vexillological symbol
- Glossary of vexillology
- Civil flag
- Ensign (flag)
- Ethnic flag
- Flag families
- Maritime flag
- National flag
- National coat of arms
- National emblem
- National seal
- National symbol
- State flag
- Galleries and lists:
  - Flags of Europe
  - Gallery of sovereign state flags
  - Gallery of flags of dependent territories
  - Lists of flags
  - List of national flags by design
  - List of national flags of sovereign states
  - List of Japanese flags
  - List of United Kingdom flags
  - List of Antarctic flags
  - List of flags by color combination
  - List of sovereign states by date of current flag adoption
  - Gallery pages of flags of country subdivisions
