= Flag of the Organisation of Islamic Cooperation =

Organisation of Islamic Cooperation
- Adopted: 2011
- Design: A green shade globe, surrounded by a crescent moon, with the Kaaba at the center of the globe on a white field.
- Former flag
- Adopted: 1981
- Relinquished: 2011
- Design: A green field with an upward-facing red crescent enveloped in a white disc in the center; inside the disc, the words "Allahu Akbar" were written in Arabic calligraphy.

The flag of the Organisation of Islamic Cooperation was adopted in 2011.

== Design and symbolism ==
It is white with the organization's emblem in the center, which consists of a green shade globe, surrounded by a crescent moon, with the Kaaba at the center of the globe on a white field. The elements of the emblem reflect the organization's corporate philosophy according to their new statutes.

== Former flag ==
The former flag was adopted in 1981, which featured a green background with an upward-facing red crescent enveloped in a white disc in the center; inside the disc, the words "Allahu Akbar" were written in Arabic calligraphy.

== See also ==
- Green in Islam
- Flag of the Arab League
- Flag of the Turkic Council
