= Flag of Mercosur =

Southern Common Market
- Use: Other
- Proportion: 10:13
- Adopted: 17 December 1996
- Designed by: Carlos Varau
- Portuguese version

The flag of Mercosur is the official flag of Southern Common Market. It is a white flag with the blue constellation of the Southern Cross above the commonly used abbreviation of the organization's name, i.e. Mercosur in Spanish and Mercosul in Portuguese.

== Design ==
The Mercosur Flag is made up of a white rectangle and above it has the Mercosur emblem that is composed of four blue stars located in a curved green line, representing the constellation of the southern transept that emerges from the horizon.

The four blue stars also represent the four founding countries: Argentina, Brazil, Paraguay and Uruguay. The flag's official colors were standardized in 2002 and are stated as Pantone Blue 286 C and Pantone Green 347 C.

=== Color scheme ===
Mercosur	Blue	Green
Pantone	286 C	347 C
RGB	#0033ab	#009959
CMYK	100.70.0.32.9	100.0.41.8.40

== History ==
The emblem was chosen in a contest promoted by the Communications Directorates of the Presidencies of the Member States, in which 1,412 works were presented, with the winner being the Argentine designer Carlos Varau. The approval of the winning design took place at the XI Meeting of the Common Market Council (CMC), held on December 16 and 17, 1996, in the city of Fortaleza, Ceará, Brazil. In 2002, the Common Market Council regulated the use of the Common Market of the South, the acronym MERCOSUR and the Emblem / Logo of MERCOSUR, through the approval of Decision No. 17/02. In accordance with this Decision, the symbols are in use in the states parties and related bodies and may be used without prior permission by individuals or national entities of the member states, always in a manner consistent with the objectives of Mercosur.

== See also ==
- Flag of Europe
- Flag of the Eurasian Economic Union
