= List of Azerbaijani flags =

This is a list of flags used in Azerbaijan, both today and in the past.

== National flag ==
Flag	Date	Use	Description
	2013–present	Flag of the Republic of Azerbaijan	Horizontal tricolour of bright blue, red, and green, with a white crescent and a centred eight-pointed star. Proportion 1:2.

== Governmental flags ==
Flag	Date	Use	Description
	1992–present	Presidential standard	National tricolour with the coat of arms in the center
	2004–present	Presidential standard (at sea)	Naval ensign with national tricolour and the coat of arms in the center

== Azerbaijani Armed Forces ==
=== Azerbaijani Land Forces ===
Flag	Date	Use	Description
		Flag of the Azerbaijani Land Forces	

=== Azerbaijani Navy ===
Flag	Date	Use	Description
	1991	Ensign of the Azerbaijani Navy	As Azerbaijan was formerly a Soviet republic, the naval ensign of Azerbaijan closely mimics the old Soviet equivalent; a star and crescent replaces the red star, a blue anchor replaces the hammer and sickle, and what used to be a simple light blue bar at the bottom of the flag has been replaced by a wavy sort of pattern.
	1991	Flag of the commander in chief of Azerbaijan Naval Staff	
	1991	Flag of the commander in chief of the Azerbaijani Navy	
	1991	Flag of the commander of a group of Azerbaijan Navy	
	1991	The flag of the Azerbaijani Coast Guard	A green flag with the flag of the Navy in the canton.
	1991	Flag of the president of Azerbaijan while on board a ship of the State Border Service	
	1991	Flag of the chief of the State Border Service - Commander of Border Troops	
	1991	Flag of the chief of general staff of the Border Troops	
	1991	Flag of the commander of a group of vessels	
	1991	Command pennant of Border Patrol vessels	
	1991	Masthead pennant of Border Patrol vessels	

=== Azerbaijani Air Force ===
Flag	Date	Use	Description
	1991	Flag of the Azerbaijani Air and Air Defence Force	

=== Border Service of Azerbaijan ===
Flag	Date	Use	Description
	1991	Flag of the Border Troops (reverse). Note: The obverse of the flag is similar to the national flag	
	1991	Flag of the Border Regiments (reverse). Note: The obverse of the flag is similar to the national flag	
	1991	Flag of the Border Units (reverse). Note: The obverse of the flag is similar to the national flag	

=== Internal Troops of Azerbaijan ===
Flag	Date	Use	Description
		Flag of the Internal Troops of Azerbaijan	
		Flag of the Vashag	

== Political flags ==
Flag	Date	Description
	2005–present	Flag of the Democratic Reforms Party

== Ethnic groups flags ==
Flag	Date	Use	Description
		Flags of Avars	
		Flag of Lezgins	
		Flags of Talysh people	

== Historical flags ==
Flag	Date	Use	Description
	1747–1828	Banner of the Nakhichevan Khanate	
	1918	Flag of the Centrocaspian Dictatorship	Three horizontal stripes, the upper and lower stripes of light blue colour and the middle stripe red.
	1917	Flag of the Musavat Party of Turkic Federalists	
	1918	Flag of the Azerbaijan Democratic Republic	Source for the design of the current flag
	1918–1919	Flag of the Republic of Aras	
	1918	Flag of the Baku Commune	Bears the text Бакинскiй Совнаркомь (Bakinskiy Sovnarkom)
	1918–1920	Flag of Azerbaijan Democratic Republic	Similar to the current flag
	1920	Flag of the Azerbaijan Soviet Socialist Republic	
	1920–1921	Flag of the Azerbaijan Socialist Soviet Republic	
	1921–1922	Flag of the Azerbaijan Socialist Soviet Republic	
	1922–1924	Flag of the Azerbaijan Socialist Soviet Republic (TSFSR)	
	1924–1927	Flag of the Azerbaijan Socialist Soviet Republic (TSFSR)	
	1927–1931	Flag of the Azerbaijan Soviet Socialist Republic (TSFSR)	
	1931–1937	Flag of the Azerbaijan Soviet Socialist Republic (TSFSR)	
	1930s–1936	Flag of the Transcaucasian Socialist Federative Soviet Republic	
	1937–1940	Flag of the Azerbaijan Soviet Socialist Republic	
	1940–1952	Flag of the Azerbaijan Soviet Socialist Republic	
	1952–1991	Flag of the Azerbaijan Soviet Socialist Republic	Flag of the Azerbaijan Soviet Socialist Republic
	1952–1991	Reverse flag	All flags of the constituent republics of the Soviet Union did not bear the hammer and sickle on their reverse side.
	1921–1925	Flag of the Nakhichevan Autonomous Soviet Socialist Republic	
	1937–1939	Flag of the Nakhichevan Autonomous Soviet Socialist Republic	One version of the flag of the Nakhichevan Autonomous Soviet Socialist Republic. Later versions bore the text "Нахчыван МССР" (Naxçıvan MSSR, meaning Nakhichevan ASSR), placed on the flag of the Azerbaijan SSR of the time, without the Armenian name.
	1939–1940	Flag of the Nakhichevan Autonomous Soviet Socialist Republic	
	1940–1945	Flag of the Nakhichevan Autonomous Soviet Socialist Republic	
	1945–1953	Flag of the Nakhichevan Autonomous Soviet Socialist Republic	
	1956–1978	Flag of the Nakhichevan Autonomous Soviet Socialist Republic	
	1978–1990	Flag of the Nakhichevan Autonomous Soviet Socialist Republic	Last flag of the Nakhichevan Autonomous Soviet Socialist Republic
	1991–2013	Flag of the Republic of Azerbaijan	Similar to the flag of the Azerbaijani Democratic Republic and the current flag of the Republic of Azerbaijan
	1993	Flag of the Talysh-Mughan Autonomous Republic	

== Azerbaijanis in other countries ==
Flag	Date	Use	Description
		Flag of Iraqi Turkmen	
		Flags of Iranian Azerbaijanis	
