= Flag of Orlando =

City of Orlando
- Proportion: 3:5
- Adopted: July 24, 2017
- Design: Horizontal bicolor of white and blue featuring the Lake Eola fountain and a yellow ring in the shape of the letter O
- Designed by: Tim Eggert

The flag of Orlando, Florida is a horizontal bicolor flag of white and blue defaced with a stylized depiction of the Linton E. Allen Memorial Fountain in the center. The bottom blue stripe takes up one third of the vertical length. Surrounding the fountain is a golden depiction of the sun in the shape of the letter "O." The portion of the sun over the blue stripe is split by four thin blue stripes, creating the appearance of sunlight over waves.

== Design and symbolism ==
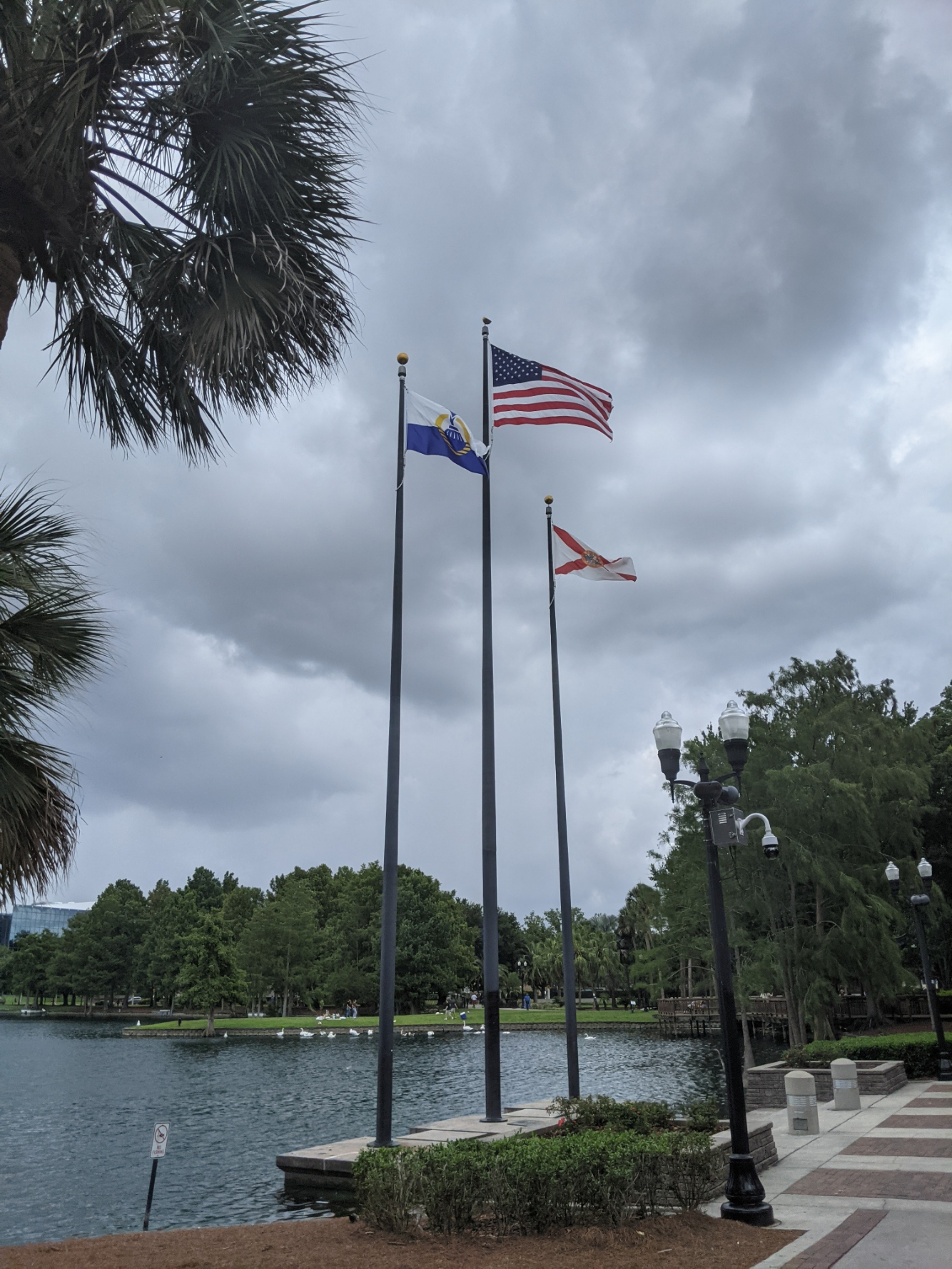
The flag of Orlando at Lake Eola alongside the flags of the United States and Florida

The white and blue background represents patriotism, perseverance, and peace. The yellow represents sunshine, hope, and happiness. The Lake Eola fountain was selected as a distinctive and recognizable symbol of the city, and its flowing water represents continuous energy and innovation. The base of the fountain is divided into six equal segments, which represents the six commission districts of Orlando. The yellow ring – in the shape of the letter O – symbolizes unity, connectivity, and timelessness. The blue stripe also represents water, and the yellow sunshine reflecting on it symbolizes the city's careful consideration of the past and its bold vision for the future.

The colors approximation is listed below:

Color scheme	White	Blue	Yellow
CMYK	0, 0, 0, 0	100, 46, 0, 34	0, 23, 97, 4
RGB	255, 255, 255	0, 90, 168	246, 190, 7
Hexadecimal	#ffffff	#005aa8	#f6be07

== History ==
=== First flag ===
Orlando's first city flag (1960–1980)

Orlando's first flag was designed and adopted in 1960, and consisted of a blue saltire on a gold field, with the city seal placed in the center. It was designed by Marie Cameron, the wife of William H. Murray, the commander of American Legion Post 19 at the time. His desire to create a city flag came about when he was captain of the post's color guard, and discovered the city did not have an official flag. He appealed to the city council, and had a flag designed with the approval of the council.

=== Second flag ===
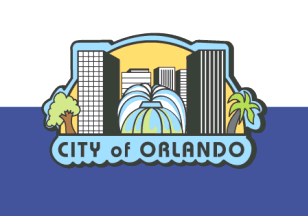
Orlando's second city flag (1980–2017)

The city's second flag, like the current one, was created through a design contest. The contest was sponsored by the Council of Arts and Sciences as well as the Orlando Kiwanis Club. It was adopted by the city council on June 2, 1980 and remained in use until the new design was adopted.

Both the former and current flags of Orlando were horizontal bicolors of white and blue, but in the city's first flag these two stripes were equal in size. The flag featured two palm trees, two unidentified buildings, and the Lake Eola fountain in the center. Other buildings could be seen behind the fountain. The bottom of the flag read "CITY of ORLANDO" surrounded by a light blue color. The flag had a light yellow-orange semicircle behind the objects seen in the foreground.

=== Current flag ===
The flag of Orlando was redesigned through a contest to celebrate the city's 142nd birthday. The flag redesign contest was launched on February 15, 2017. The Orlando City Council allowed a period of four months for public input and committee discussions. The submission process lasted from February 15 to March 22; any individual could submit up to three designs, but they had to be submitted via traditional mail or delivered to one of seven accepted locations. The city received more than 1,100 submissions sent from at least seven countries, twelve states, and five local schools. The flag was selected from a list of finalists, and on July 24, 2017, it was approved. When voted on by the city council, all but one commissioner voted in favor of adopting the flag. During the redesign process, the city council met at least six times, during which the council reportedly engaged with 23,000 people via social media and at least 500 residents in person. The flag was designed by Tim Eggert, a professional graphic designer and graduate from the University of Central Florida. The first raising of the flag was in front of the Orlando City Hall at 1:00 PM, during which the mayor, Buddy Dyer, was accompanied by city commissioners.
