= Flag of French Guiana =

French Guiana
- Use: National flag
- Proportion: 2:3
- Design: A vertical tricolour of dark blue, white, and red
- Use: Commonly used but not official flag of French Guiana
- Proportion: 2:3
- Design: Divides diagonally with green in the upper fly and yellow in the lower hoist and bears a red five pointed star in the center.

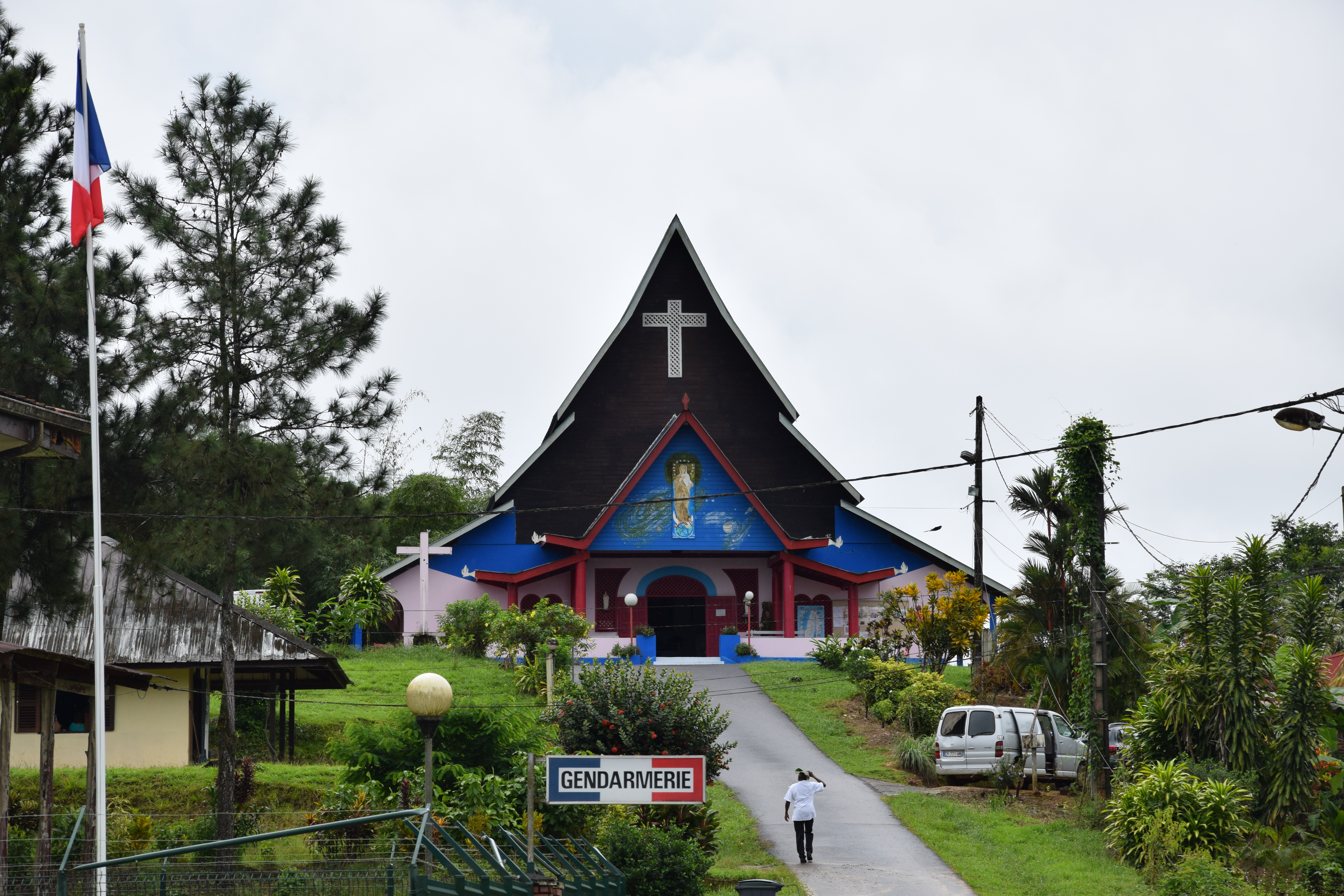
French flag in Cacao, French Guiana

French Guiana has no official flag, with the national French flag used when a flag is needed to represent it either as an overseas region or an department of France.

A widely used unofficial flag consists of two triangles, colored green in the upper fly and yellow in the lower hoist, with a red star in the centre. It was designed in 1967 by the Guyana Agricultural and General Workers' Union. Following two discussions at the Guyanese Social Forum, it was eventually adopted by the Departmental Council of French Guiana, though remaining unofficial. The design is also used by the French Guiana national football team.

== Design and symbolism of unofficial flag ==
The unofficial flag divides diagonally with green in the upper fly and yellow in the lower hoist and bears a red five pointed star in the center. The green in the flag represents the forests, yellow represents gold and other minerals of the region, while the red star represents either blood or socialism.

== Status ==
As French Guiana is an overseas region and department of France located in South America, it has the vertical tricolour of blue, white, and red of the French flag as its official national flag. The unofficial flag was designed in 1967 by the Guyana Agricultural and General Workers' Union and was adopted by the Union in September of the same year. Its design was a topic of discussion during the Guyanese Social Forum in Awala-Yalimapo in December 2006 and again in June 2007. The flag was then adopted by the Departmental Council of French Guiana; although it remains unofficial, it has also been used by the French Guiana national football team.

== Gallery ==
Flag of the territorial collectivity

Banner of arms of French Guiana

Flag of the former departmental council of French Guiana, disbanded in 2015

Flag of the 6 indigenous peoples of Guyana (Since 2012)

== See also ==
- Coat of arms of French Guiana
- Flag of Guyana
- Flag of France
