= Flag of ECOWAS =

Economic Community of West African States (ECOWAS)

The Flag of the Economic Community of West African States (ECOWAS) is the flag of ECOWAS, a political and economic union of twelve countries in West Africa. The flag was adopted in 1975.

== Design ==
The flag features a white background with the ECOWAS emblem centered on it. The emblem consists of a stylized depiction of a drum and a circular motif, along with the inscriptions “ECOWAS” at the bottom and “CEDEAO” (the French and Portuguese acronym) at the top, The flag’s proportion is typically 2:3. In 2024, the military governments of Niger, Burkina Faso, and Mali jointly announced their withdrawal from the bloc, despite this, they're still highlighted on the flag and seal of the union.

== Symbolism ==
- Drum: Symbolizes the rich cultural heritage and unity of West African countries.
- Circular Motif: Represents unity and integration among member states.
- White Background: Signifies peace and stability within the region.
- Green and Brown Colors: Green symbolizes agriculture and natural wealth; brown represents the earth and the common heritage.
