= Don de Dieu =

Samuel de Champlain's ship

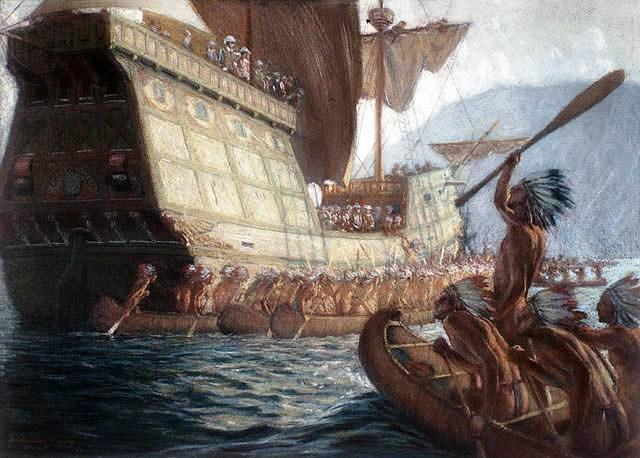
St. Lawrence Iroquoians welcome Samuel de Champlain, on board of Le Don de Dieu, when arriving at Québec in 1608.

Explorer Samuel de Champlain arrived on the ship Don de Dieu, or "Gift of God" to found Quebec in 1608.

Don de Dieu is one of three ships that set sail from France under Captain Henry Couillard in the spring of 1608 to Tadoussac, from where the men, bringing the materials, reached on small boats what is now the Vieux-Québec (Canada), on July 3, 1608, date of the founding of Quebec City.

== 1633 voyage to Quebec ==
In 1633, Cardinal Richelieu appointed Champlain as his lieutenant, giving him the opportunity to return to Quebec. (Champlain had been removed from his position as Governor of Quebec the prior year and had dedicated himself to working on a new edition of his voyages.) In March 1633, Champlain set sail for Quebec with about 200 colonists in three ships, Don de Dieu, St. Pierre, and St. Jean. He was received in Quebec with "loud acclamations."

== Replica ship at 300th anniversary ==
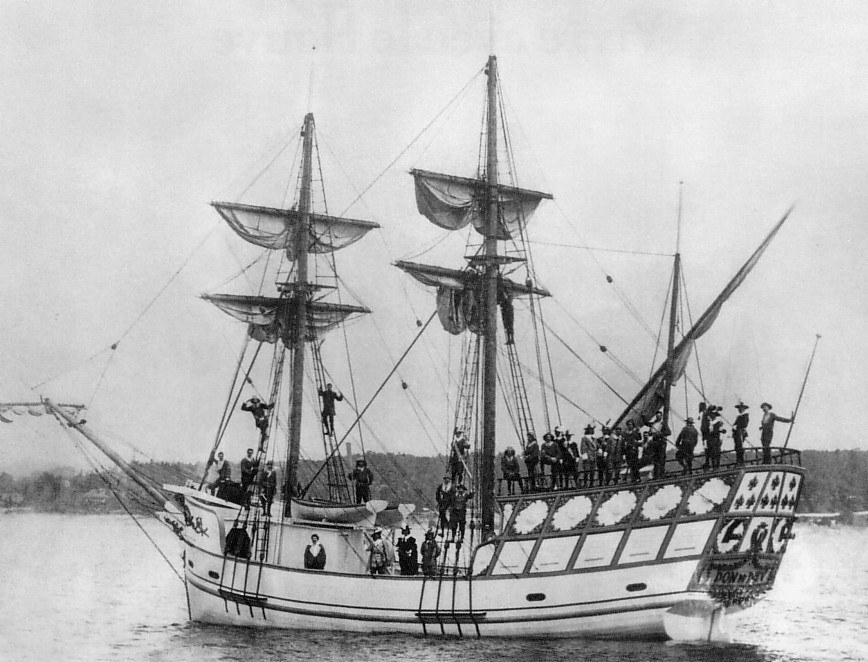
- Replica of Don de Dieu during the 300th anniversary of the founding of Quebec City in 1908

History

Canada
- Name: Don de Dieu
- Builder: Jean A. Chapdelaine, Sorel, Quebec
- Launched: 1907

General characteristics
- Tons burthen: 3 tons
- Length: 31 m (102 ft)
- Propulsion: Sail

A pageant was held for the 300th anniversary, the Quebec Tercentenary in 1908.

July 23. At 3 p.m. — Arrival of Champlain on his ship, Don de Dieu. At 4 o'clock. — Presentation of the Civic Address of welcome to H.R.H. The Prince of Wales with other official ceremonies commemorative of Champlain and of the founding of Quebec. Review of the Historical procession in front of the Champlain Monument. Illumination of the combined fleets and of the surrounding country in the evening and great display of fireworks on the Heights of Levis opposite Quebec.

== In city symbols ==
The ship is remembered in the motto of Quebec City: Don de Dieu feray valoir, "I shall put God's gift to good use."

A sailing vessel symbolizing the city's founding, among other things, appears in Quebec City's logo, coat of arms, and flag.

Logo of Quebec City

Coat of arms of Quebec City

Flag of Quebec City
