= Flag of Quebec City =

Canadian municipal flag

Quebec City
- Adopted: 12 January 1987
- Design: An azure background with a white border (crenelated) and a gold ship in the centre.

The flag of Quebec City (French: drapeau de la ville de Québec) was officially adopted on January 12, 1987.

== Design and symbolism ==
The flag depicts a gold coloured ship on a deep blue field surrounded by a crenelated white border representing its unique city walls. The border also signifies the fortified city its founder came from, Brouage in Saintonge, France.

The ship is Samuel de Champlain's ship, Don de Dieu, a reminder of the city's founder. The outward sails symbolize the bravery and strength of the population. The ship also signifies the city as being a major seaport in North America.

The heraldic colours used have the following meaning:

- Yellow (or) represents strength, justice, consistency, wealth, faith and luster.
- White (argent) stands for purity, truth, charity, humility, and victory.
- Blue (azure) means loyalty, clarity, sovereignty, majesty, good reputation, knowledge and serenity. Blue is also predominant in the city's coat of arms to emphasize its foundation by the French.

== Historical flags ==
Historical flags of Quebec City
Historical flag	Duration	Description
	1967-1987	A white field with Quebec City's Coat of Arms and Quebec's flag in the canton.
