= Flag of the Eurasian Economic Union =

Eurasian Economic Union
- Other names: Flag of the Eurasian Economic Union, Flag of EEU, Flag of Eurasia
- Use: It represents the economic union in the constituent countries and also before the world and also used in official documents, buildings and ceremonial on the block.
- Proportion: 2:3
- Adopted: 10 October 2014
- Design: In summary description it consists of the emblem of the Eurasian Economic Union on a white background rectangle.
- Designed by: Russia

The Flag of the Eurasian Economic Union is one of the symbols of the economic community formed by Eurasian countries and was created by an official document issued by the economic bloc in 2014.

== History ==
The establishment of the flag and emblem was provided in the literature of article 12, item 20 of the treaty establishing the Eurasian Economic Union, which was ratified on May 29, 2014, and the symbols were published on October 10, 2014, by decision number 76 which was approved by decision of the Supreme Economic Council of Eurasia.

== Vexillology and description ==
According to the creation document and the Statute on the Symbols of Eurasian Economic Union, the official symbols of the bloc are the Union flag and the emblem of the Union; the flag has an image of the official emblem of the Union in the center of a rectangular panel of white color and in the middle has two colors: blue and gold form a dynamic figure in symmetrical reflection in whose center is the image of the map of Eurasia in a circle.

The white color of the flag and the image of the map of the Member States reflect the peaceful nature of the Union's activities. The ratio of the flag width to its size is 2: 3.

The image of the Union emblem symbolizes the desire for economic cooperation of the member states. Blue is the symbol of Europe. The golden color is the symbol of Asia. The circle reflects the common interests of the two parts of the world - Europe and Asia: the blue part of the circle is in the golden part of the dynamic figure, the golden part of the circle is in the blue part of the dynamic figure. The Union emblem shall be at the center of the Union flag. The image of the Union flag shall correspond to the image of the Union flag; the image of the Union emblem shall correspond to the image of the Union emblem.

== Official uses ==
The Union flag and the Union emblem shall be placed:

- In buildings or installations occupied by Union bodies;
- In the buildings or premises where meetings of the Union bodies are held, during the period of their implementation.
