= Flag of the Organization of Turkic States =

Official symbol used by the Organization of Turkic States

Organization of Turkic States
- Adopted: 23 August 2012; 6 November 2024 (current form)
- Design: A turquoise blue flag with a sun with forty uniformly spaced rays, an eight-pointed star (Rub el Hizb), a crescent, and an eight-pointed Seljuk star
- Former design
- Adopted: 2012
- Relinquished: 2024

The flag of the Organization of Turkic States, formerly the flag of the Turkic Council, was adopted at its 2nd Summit, which took place in Bishkek on 23 August 2012 and officially raised on 12 October 2012.

The flag combines the symbols of the original four members: the turquoise color of the flag of Kazakhstan, the sun of the flag of Kyrgyzstan, the star of the flag of Azerbaijan and the crescent of the Turkish flag. Background of the flag is Pantone "3125 C", approximate web color is #00AEC7 .

On 6 November 2024, a new flag was proposed during Bishkek Summit. There are two proposed changes to the current flag. Proposed flag contains an eight-pointed Seljuk star, which is used in several emblems such as presidential standards of Turkmenistan and Uzbekistan, Ottoman State emblem. Second change is the straight sun beams to reflect the changes made to the Kyrgyz flag in 2023.

== See also ==
- Organization of Turkic States
