= Flag of Talysh-Mughan Autonomous Republic =

Flag of the Talysh-Mughan Autonomous Republic
- Proportion: 2:3
- Relinquished: August 7, 1993 by the People's Assembly of the Talysh-Mughan Autonomous Republic
- Design: Red, white and green tricolor (colors of Iranic people), with a sun with twelve rays in the centre and the sea just below

The flag of Talysh-Mughan Autonomous Republic (Talysh: Tolışə pərçəm) was adopted on August 7, 1993 as the state flag of the unrecognized Talysh-Mughan Autonomous Republic.

== Description ==
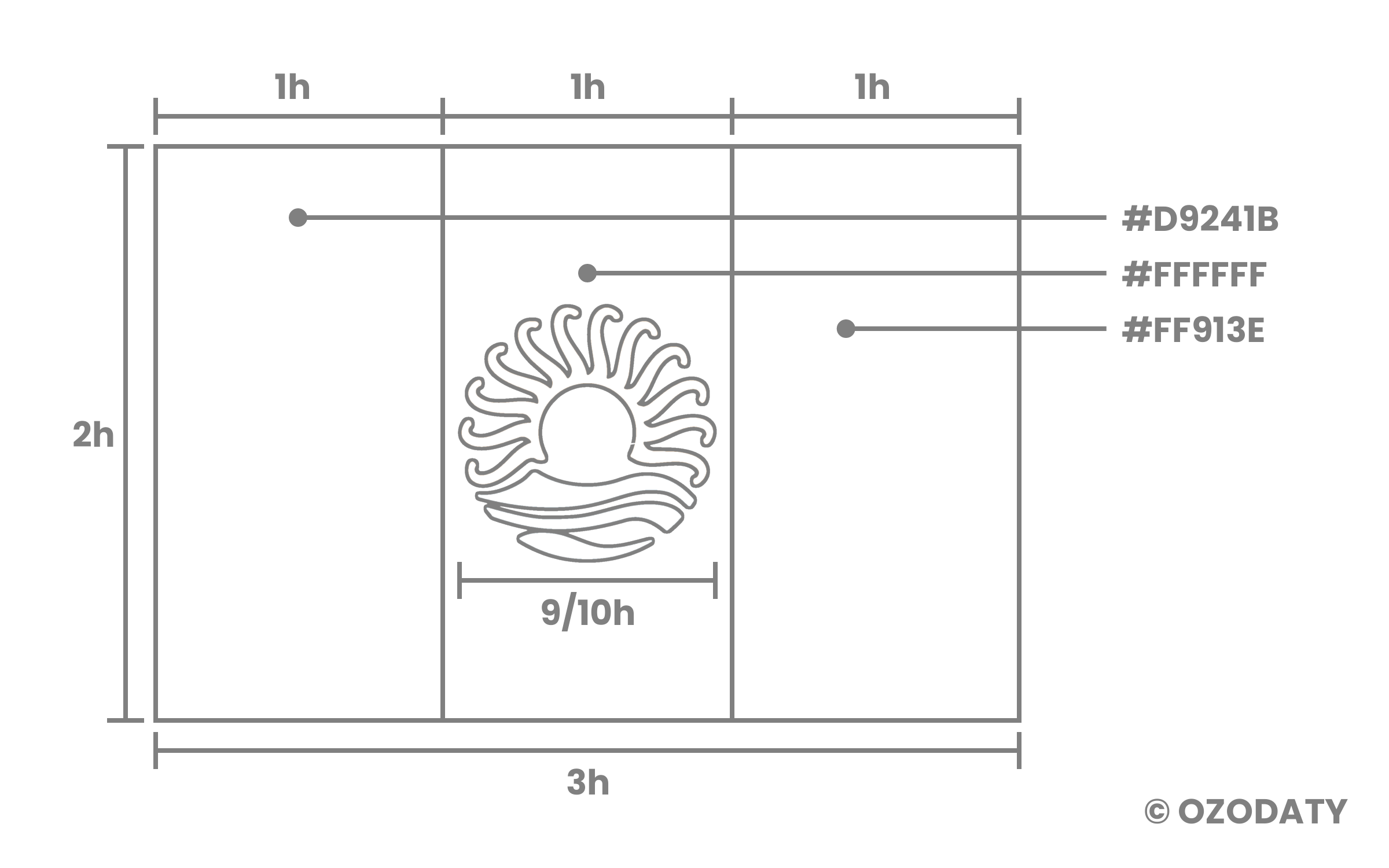
Flag construction sheet

The ratio of the width to the length of the Talysh flag is 2:3. This flag consists of three colored fabrics (tricolor). These pieces consist of three vertical stripes of equal width, red on the right, white in the middle and green on the left. The center of the white stripe depicts the sun and the sea. This image makes up 9/10 of the strip.

== Colors and symbols ==
The Talysh flag, like the flags of other Iranian-speaking peoples, has three colors (red, white and green).

| Talysh National Movement | Red | White | Green | Middle Sun | Sea |
|---|---|---|---|---|---|
| Hexademical | #D9241B | #FFFFFF | #00913E | #ff8601 | #007bbe |
| RGB | 217-36-27 | 255-255-255 | 0-145-62 | 255-134-1 | 0-123-193 |

- Red color — It is the color of blood, it glorifies all the Talysh who have been killed throughout history.
- White color — glorifies the spirit of freedom of the people.
- Green color — Islam.
- Sun with twelve rays — glorifies the 12 imams of Islam.
- Sea — glorifies the geographical area inhabited by the Talysh and the Caspian Sea.
