= Flag of the Arab League =

League of Arab States
- Use: National flag and ensign
- Proportion: 2:3 – 1:2
- Adopted: 8 March 1945 (LoAS)
- Design: Two olive branches and 22 chain-links encircling a crescent and the name of the organisation (in Arabic)
- Designed by: unknown

The flag of the Arab League comprises a green banner bearing the seal of the Arab League. The twenty-two links in the chain represent the twenty-two members of the League at the time of the flag's adoption. The script gives the name of the organization: "League of Arab States".

There are also several flags for the Arab League, usually seen at Arab League summits: one, a color-inverted Arab League flag with a white background for the President of the summit was clearly seen in the Arab League Summit in Beirut in 2002.

Older Arab League flags have the chains in red or black, the Arabic script in black or gold with green or white crescents, usually adopted in the 1950s to the 1970s.

== History ==
The flag was adopted on March 8, 1945 as the organization's national flag. The creator of the flag is unknown. The flag serves as an official flag for Algeria, Bahrain, Comoros, Djibouti, Egypt, Iraq, Jordan, Kuwait, Lebanon, Libya, Mauritania, Morocco, Oman, Palestine, Qatar, Saudi Arabia, Somalia, Sudan, Syria, Tunisia, United Arab Emirates, and Yemen.

== Description ==
The flag contains a modified version of the Emblem of the Arab League portrayed in the center of the flag on a green background. The twenty-two chain links of the emblem represents the twenty-two countries members of The league.

== Other flags ==
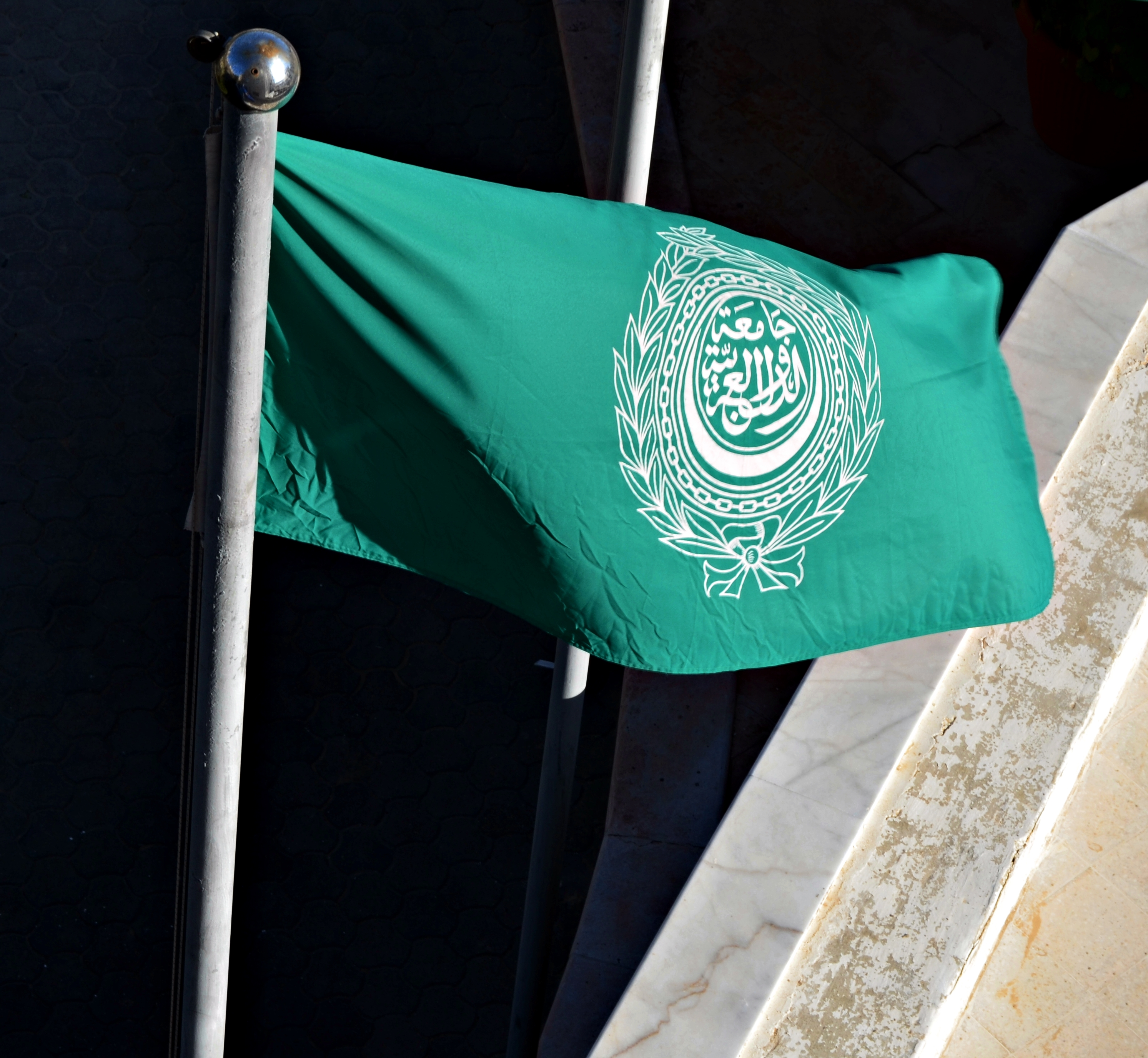
The flag hoisted in Amman, Jordan

== See also ==
- Arab League – Regional organisation
- Flag of the African Union
- Flag of the Arab Revolt
- Flag of Europe
- Flag of the United Nations
- List of Arab flags
- Pan-Arab colors – Color combination first used in the flag of the 1916 Arab Revolt
