= Symbols of the European Union =

Adoption
Symbol	EU	CoE
Flag	Yes	Yes
Anthem	Yes	Yes
Motto	Yes	No
Europe Day	9 May	5 May

Signatories of the 2007 declaration in dark blue.

The European Union (EU) uses a number of symbols, including the Flag of Europe, Anthem of Europe, Motto of the European Union and Europe Day.

These symbols have no official status based in the EU treaties, but they are in de facto use by the EU institutions and are in widespread use as expressions of the political ideologies of Pan-Europeanism and European integration.

Use of the Flag of Europe in particular is widespread also among pro-EU factions outside of the European Union, especially in the "colour revolutions" of Eastern Europe.

== History ==
These symbols go back to 1985, when they were introduced by the European Communities summit in Milan. A "raft of cultural icons" was launched by the European Commission in 1985, in reaction to the report by the ad hoc commission "for a People's Europe" chaired by Pietro Adonnino. The aim was to facilitate European integration by fostering a Pan-European identity among the populations of the EC member states. The European Council adopted "Europe Day" along with the flag of Europe (technically not called a "flag" but an "emblem") and other items on 29 September 1985 in Milan. Even at the time, there was strong objection against the European Communities adopting symbols of statehood, in particular on the part of the United Kingdom. Thus, the adoption of the "European flag" was only possible by avoiding the official use of the term "flag", so that the "European flag" is still officially "a logo or emblem eligible to be reproduced on rectangular pieces of fabric".

There were plans to officially recognize these symbols as part of the Treaty establishing a Constitution for Europe signed in 2004. As the proposed constitutional treaty failed ratification in two member states, the mention of all state-like emblems, including the flag, were removed from the replacement Treaty of Lisbon of 2007. Instead, a declaration was made by 16 Member States and included in the Intergovernmental Conference's final act adopting the Treaty of Lisbon stating that the flag, the anthem, the motto, the currency and Europe Day "will for them continue as symbols to express the sense of community of the people in the European Union and their allegiance to it":

Belgium, Bulgaria, Germany, Greece, Spain, Italy, Cyprus, Lithuania, Luxemburg, Hungary, Malta, Austria, Portugal, Romania, Slovenia and the Slovak Republic declare that the flag with a circle of twelve golden stars on a blue background, the anthem based on the "Ode to Joy" from the Ninth Symphony by Ludwig van Beethoven, the motto "United in diversity", the euro as the currency of the European Union and Europe Day on 9 May will for them continue as symbols to express the sense of community of the people in the European Union and their allegiance to it.

The European Parliament, objecting to the absence of the symbols from the Treaty of Lisbon, backed a proposal to use the symbols such as the flag more often in the Parliament with Jo Leinen MEP suggesting that the Parliament should again take the avant-garde in their use.

In September 2008, the Parliament's Committee on Constitutional Affairs proposed a formal change in the institution's rules of procedure to make better use of the symbols: the flag would be present in all meeting rooms (not just the hemicycle) and at all official events; the anthem would be played at the start of a new Parliament following elections and at formal sittings; the motto would be printed on all Parliamentary documents; and "Europe Day" would be formally recognised by Parliament. The proposal was passed on 8 October 2008 by 503 votes to 96 (15 abstentions).

In 2017, the president of France Emmanuel Macron sent a letter to European Council President Donald Tusk which contained a declaration endorsing the symbols declaration of the Treaty of Lisbon.

== Flag ==
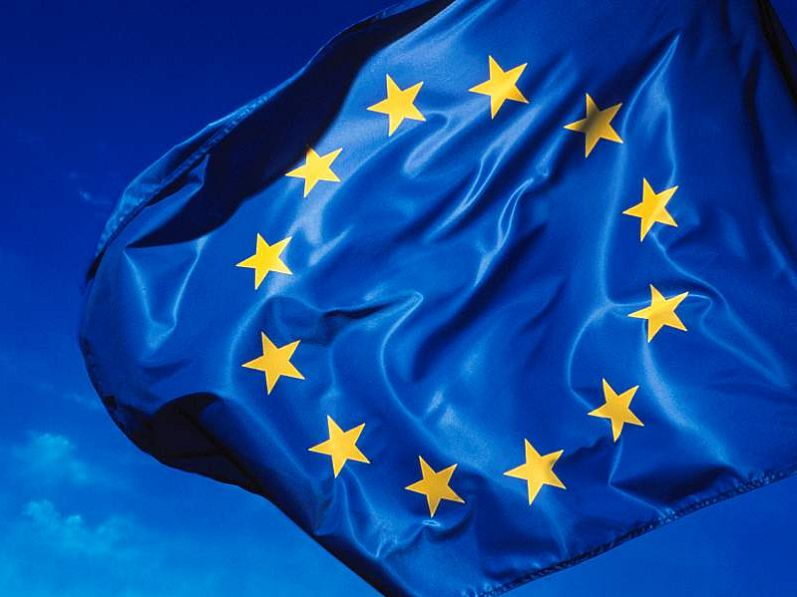
The flag of Europe, emblem of both the Council of Europe and the European Union.

The flag of Europe is used to represent both the European Union and the Council of Europe. It consists of a circle of 12 golden (yellow) stars on a blue background. The blue represents the west, the number of stars represents completeness while their position in a circle represents unity. The stars do not vary according to the members of either organisation as they are intended to represent all the peoples of Europe, even those outside European integration.

The flag was designed by Arsène Heitz and Paul M. G. Lévy in 1955 for the CoE as its symbol, and the CoE urged it to be adopted by other organisations. In 1985 the EU, which was then the European Economic Community (EEC), adopted it as its own flag (having had no flag of its own before) at the initiative of the European Parliament. The flag is not mentioned in the EU's treaties, its incorporation being dropped along with the European Constitution, but it is formally adopted in law.

Despite it being the flag of two separate organisations, it is often more associated with the EU, due to the EU's higher profile and heavy usage of the emblem. The flag has also been used to represent Europe in sporting events and as a pro-democracy banner outside the Union. It has partly inspired other flags, such as those of other European organisations and those of states where the EU has been heavily involved (such as Flag of Bosnia and Herzegovina and the Flag of Kosovo).

== Anthem ==
A piece from the original manuscript.

The European anthem is based on the prelude to "The Ode to Joy", 4th movement of Ludwig van Beethoven's Symphony No. 9. Due to the large number of languages in Europe, it is an instrumental version only, with the original German lyrics having no official status. The anthem was announced on 19 January 1972 by the Council of Europe, after being arranged by conductor Herbert von Karajan. The anthem was launched via a major information campaign on Europe Day, 5 May 1972.

It was adopted by European Community leaders in 1985. It does not replace national anthems, but is intended to celebrate their shared values. It is played on official occasions by both the Council of Europe and the European Union.

Other scores associated with pan-Europeanism include the hymn of the European Broadcasting Union (the prelude of Marc-Antoine Charpentier's Te Deum; played e.g. before every Eurovision Song Contest) and the UEFA Champions League Anthem (an arrangement of George Frideric Handel's Zadok the Priest (one of his Coronation Anthems); played before UEFA Champions League television broadcast since 1992).

Ode to Joy

== Europe Day ==
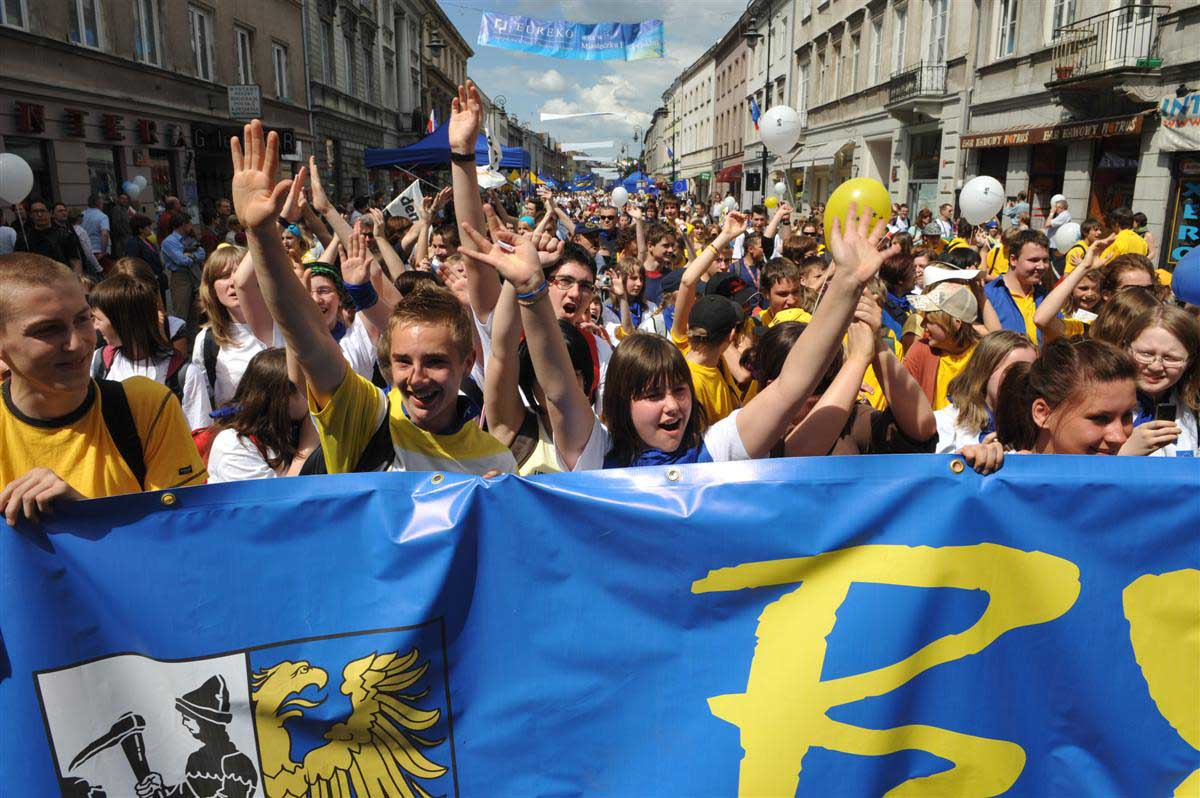
The Schuman Parade in Warsaw has been organised by the Schuman Foundation since 1999 (2008 photograph).

"Europe Day" is an observance on 9 May, adopted along with flag, anthem and motto in the European Communities summit of 1985. It was chosen to commemorate the date of the 1950 Schuman Declaration, the proposal to pool the French and West German coal and steel industries.

Observance of "Europe Day" by national and regional authorities of member states greatly increased following the establishment of the EU in 1993. Germany in particular has gone beyond celebrating just the day, since 1995 extending the observance to an entire "Europe Week" (Europawoche) centered on 9 May. Choice of the date of foundation of the European Coal and Steel Community rather than that of the EU itself established a narrative in which Schuman's speech, is presented as anticipating the "ever closer union" pursued in later decades as historical inevitability or "vocation" of the EU.

== Motto ==
Unity in Diversity was adopted as the European Union's motto on 4 May 2000 following a contest called A motto for Europe. It's inspired by a Latin-language motto by Nobel prize winner Ernesto Teodoro Moneta: In varietate unitas! or In varietate concordia! and it was selected from entries proposed by school pupils and then accepted by the President of the European Parliament, Nicole Fontaine as Diversité dans l'unité. In 2004, the motto was written into the English-language version of the failed European Constitution (article I-8 about the EU's symbols) as United in Diversity, and now appears on English language official EU websites as United in diversity.

The European Union motto was translated into all 23 official languages in 2004.

== Symbols of European Union institutions ==
Several institutions, advisory bodies and agencies within the European Union have adopted distinct emblems and logos to represent themselves:

=== Institutions ===
Logo of the European Council and the Council of the European Union

Logo of the European Central Bank

Logo of the European Commission

Logo of the European Court of Auditors

Logo of the Court of Justice of the European Union

Logo of the European Parliament

=== Advisory bodies ===
Logo of the European Committee of the Regions

Logo of the European Economic and Social Committee

Logo used by the Political and Security Committee

Logo of the European Union Military Committee

=== Agencies ===
Logo of the European External Action Service

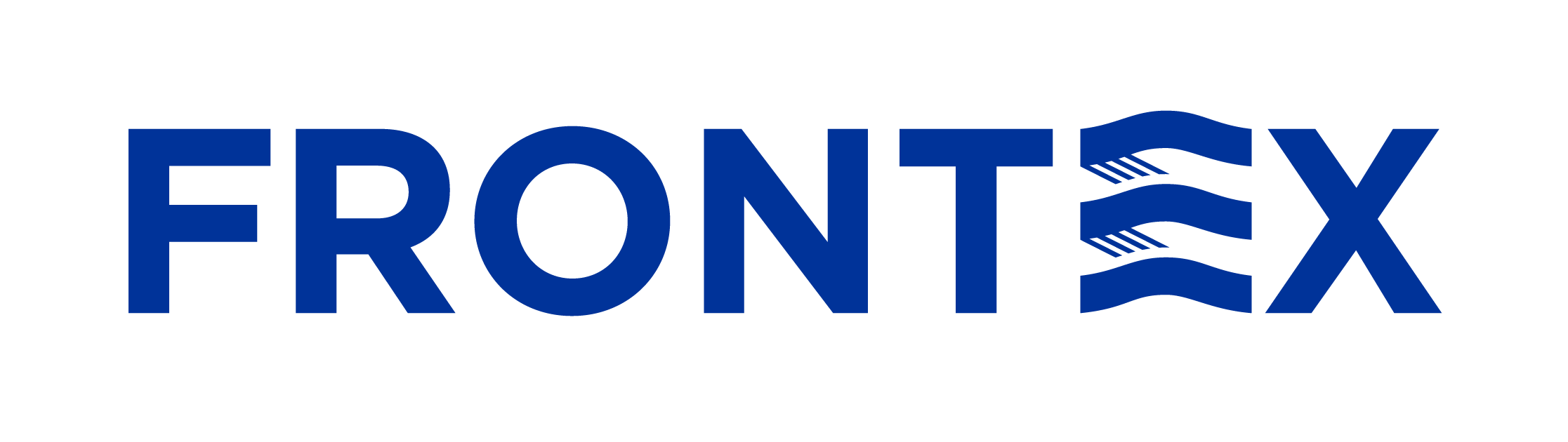
Logo of Frontex

== European Coal and Steel Community flag ==
The European Coal and Steel Community's flag.

The ECSC made use of the stars in the ECSC flag.

== The euro and its symbol ==
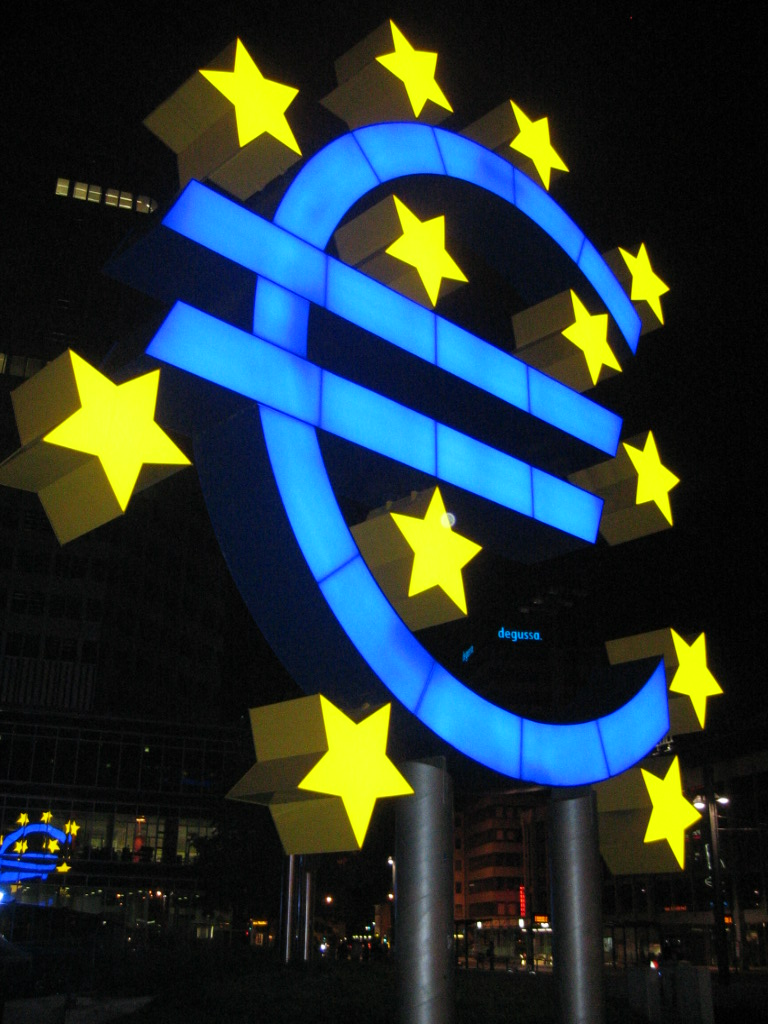
The Euro symbol shown as a sculpture outside the European Central Bank

The euro, €, was not one of the original symbols created by the Council of Europe and is specific to the EU, but it has become a symbol since it replaced 12 national currencies in 2002. It is now used by most EU Member States and hence it (along with its currency symbol) has become one of the most tangible symbols of European unity for citizens of the European Union (though this of course is not intended to apply to wider Europe as the others do).

== Adoption by other organisations ==
There have been other pan-European organisations which have not adopted the same symbols as the Council of Europe or the European Union, or have symbols derived from these. The Flag of the European Coal and Steel Community (the first of the three European Communities) was developed around the same time as the Flag of Europe and shares the use of stars and the colour blue, but uses completely different arrangement and symbolism.

The Flag of the Western European Union (the European defence organisation) was derived from the Flag of Europe, altered for its own usage. The Central Commission for Navigation on the Rhine predates them all, but its flag also uses the colour blue and a circle of stars, though with different symbolism.

== See also ==
- Pan-European identity
- European integration
- European values
