= Flag of NATO =

North Atlantic Treaty Organization
- Use: Other
- Proportion: 3:4
- Adopted: October 14, 1953
- Design: A dark blue (Pantone 280 C) field charged with a white compass rose emblem from which radiate four white lines.
- Standard of the Supreme Headquarters Allied Powers Europe
- First NATO flag
- Proportion: 1:2
- Adopted: October 5, 1951
- Relinquished: November 9, 1953 (as NATO flag)
- Design: A green field charged with SHAPE's coat of arms
- Designed by: Dwight D. Eisenhower

The flag of NATO (North Atlantic Treaty Organization) consists of a dark blue field charged with a white compass rose emblem, with four white lines radiating from the four cardinal directions. Adopted three years after the creation of NATO, it has been the flag of NATO since October 14, 1953. The blue color symbolizes the Atlantic Ocean, while the circle stands for unity.

== History ==
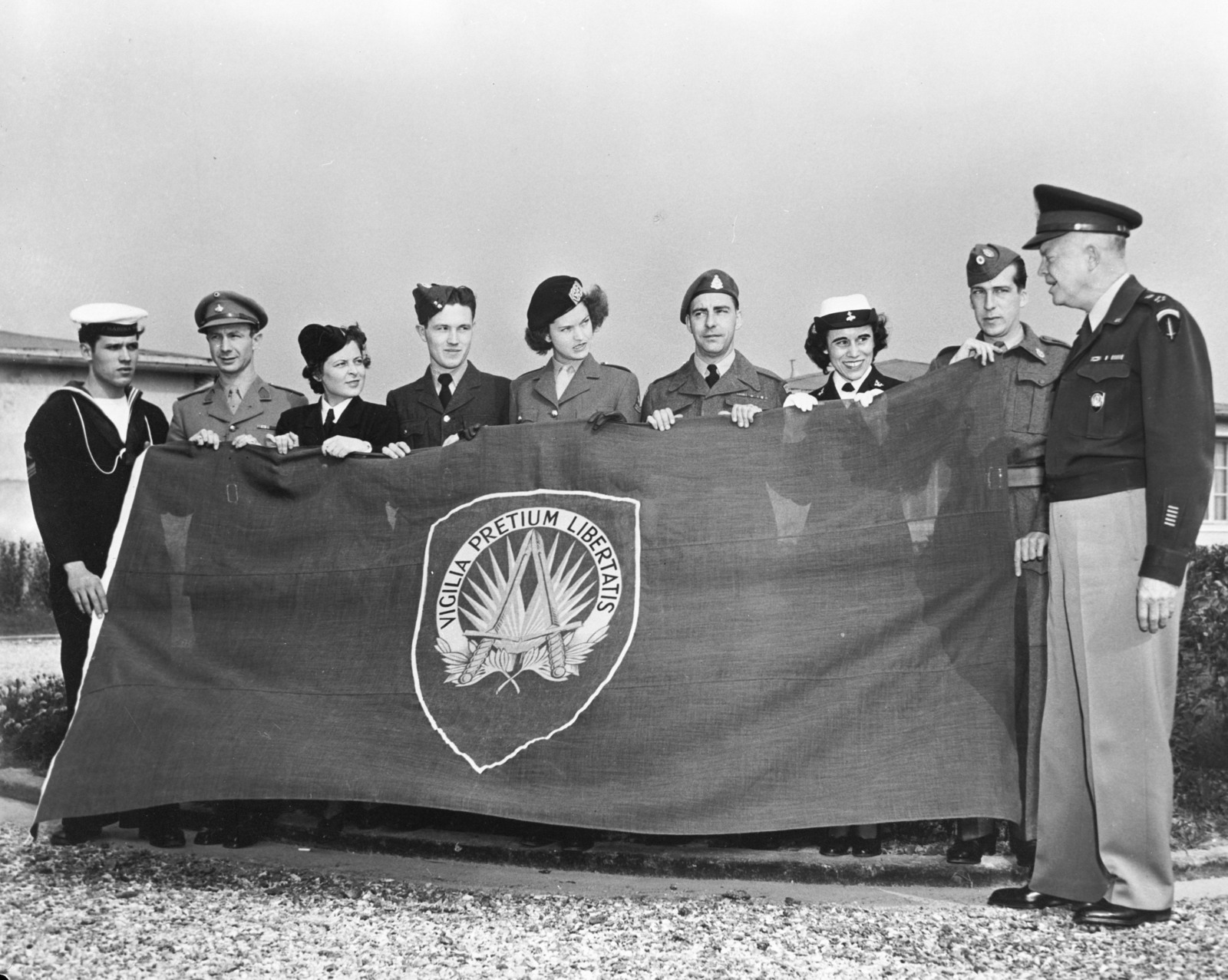
Supreme Commander (SACEUR) Eisenhower presenting the flag of Supreme Headquarters Allied Powers Europe (SHAPE) on 8 October 1951 (l.) This emblem also served as NATO's first flag, until the compass rose emblem was adopted in 1953.

The North Atlantic Treaty Organization was established on April 4, 1949, when twelve nations signed the North Atlantic Treaty to counteract the threat from the Soviet Union. The first flag used by NATO was unveiled October 5, 1951, by Gen. Dwight Eisenhower, who helped design it. The 1951 flag consisted of a green field with the coat of arms of the Supreme Headquarters Allied Powers Europe (SHAPE), which still uses the flag.

The first flag attracted criticism from US Congressman John Travers Wood, who condemned it as a "strange and alien rag" after an incident where the flag of the United States was allegedly replaced by the NATO flag in Norfolk, Virginia, the headquarters of the Supreme Allied Commander Atlantic.

NATO began looking for an emblem to differentiate it from SHAPE, a task handled by the newly formed Information Policy Working Group. After several discussions, it concluded that a flag for the organization containing its emblem was necessary, and that it would recommend this to the North Atlantic Council. The council stipulated that the design had to be "simple and striking," in addition to highlighting the "peaceful purpose" of the Treaty; several proposals were rejected. An emblem of NATO was finally adopted on October 14, 1953. The decision was announced by Hastings Ismay, 1st Baron Ismay – the first Secretary General of NATO – exactly two weeks later on October 28, where he also elaborated on the symbolism behind the chosen design. He described the flag as "simple and inoffensive."

The modern flag was first hoisted on November 9, 1953, at the opening ceremony of the Atlantic Exhibition in Paris. However, little is known about the occasion, since no documentation of the speech delivered at the event exists.

== Design ==
The colors of the flag carry cultural, political, and regional meanings. The dark blue field represents the Atlantic Ocean, while the circle stands for unity among the member states of NATO. The compass rose symbolizes the direction towards the path of peace, the goal that member states strive for; it has been updated once.

Colors scheme	Blue	White
Pantone	280C	White
HEX	#004990	#FFFFFF
RGB	0-73-144	255-255-255
CMYK	100-72-0-18	0-0-0-0

== See also ==
- "The NATO Hymn"
- Flag of Europe
- Flag of the Western Union
