= Barcode flag =

Proposed flag of the EU

- Flag barcode, EU Barcode
- Use: Proposed
- Proportion: 1:2
- Design: A flag which displays the colors on the national flags of the European Union member countries as a series of vertical stripes
- Designed by: Rem Koolhaas

The Barcode flag (also EU Barcode) was designed in 2002 and updated in 2006 by Dutch architect Remment Koolhaas as a proposal for the flag of the European Union. It was never adopted by the EU, but became well known later on after having been featured in multiple newspapers.

In 2005, it became a symbol of the Austrian presidency of the Council of the European Union.

It was criticized for its jarring appearance and resemblance to a barcode (which lent the design its colloquial name), as well as for its intentional portrayal of the EU as nothing more than a sum of its member states.
