= Arsène Heitz =

German-French draughtsman

Flag of Europe

Arsène Heitz (27 March 1908 – 1989) was a German-French draughtsman, born in Strasbourg, who worked at the Council of Europe. He was credited by some sources as being a co-designer of the Flag of Europe, in collaboration with Paul M. G. Lévy.

Heitz worked in the postal service of the Council of Europe while the flag was being chosen between 1950 and 1955, and he submitted 21 of the 101 designs that are conserved in the Council of Europe Archives.

He proposed among other drawings a circle of twelve yellow stars upon a blue background; inspired by the twelve-star halo of the Virgin Mary, the Queen of Heaven of the Book of Revelation, often portrayed in Roman Catholic art, which can be seen in the Rose Window that the Council of Europe donated to Strasbourg Cathedral in 1953. Indeed, he proposed a design with “a crown of 12 golden stars with 5 rays, their points not touching.”

His flag with twelve stars was eventually adopted by the council, and the design was finalised by Paul M. G. Lévy.

According to Lévy, Heitz's role in the actual design of the flag was relatively marginal, and the 12-star flag was one of several proposals Heitz submitted which were modified by Lévy. To this end, Lévy claimed sole authorship of the flag.
