= Federalist flag =

Flag commonly used by groups or individuals promoting European federalism

European Movement
- Proportion: 1:2
- Adopted: 1948
- Design: Green 'E' letter on a white field

The federalist flag, also known as the Flag of the European Movement, is a flag commonly used by groups or individuals promoting European federalism, consisting of a large green "E" upon a white field. It was designed as the flag of the European Movement, but is no longer used by it.

== History ==
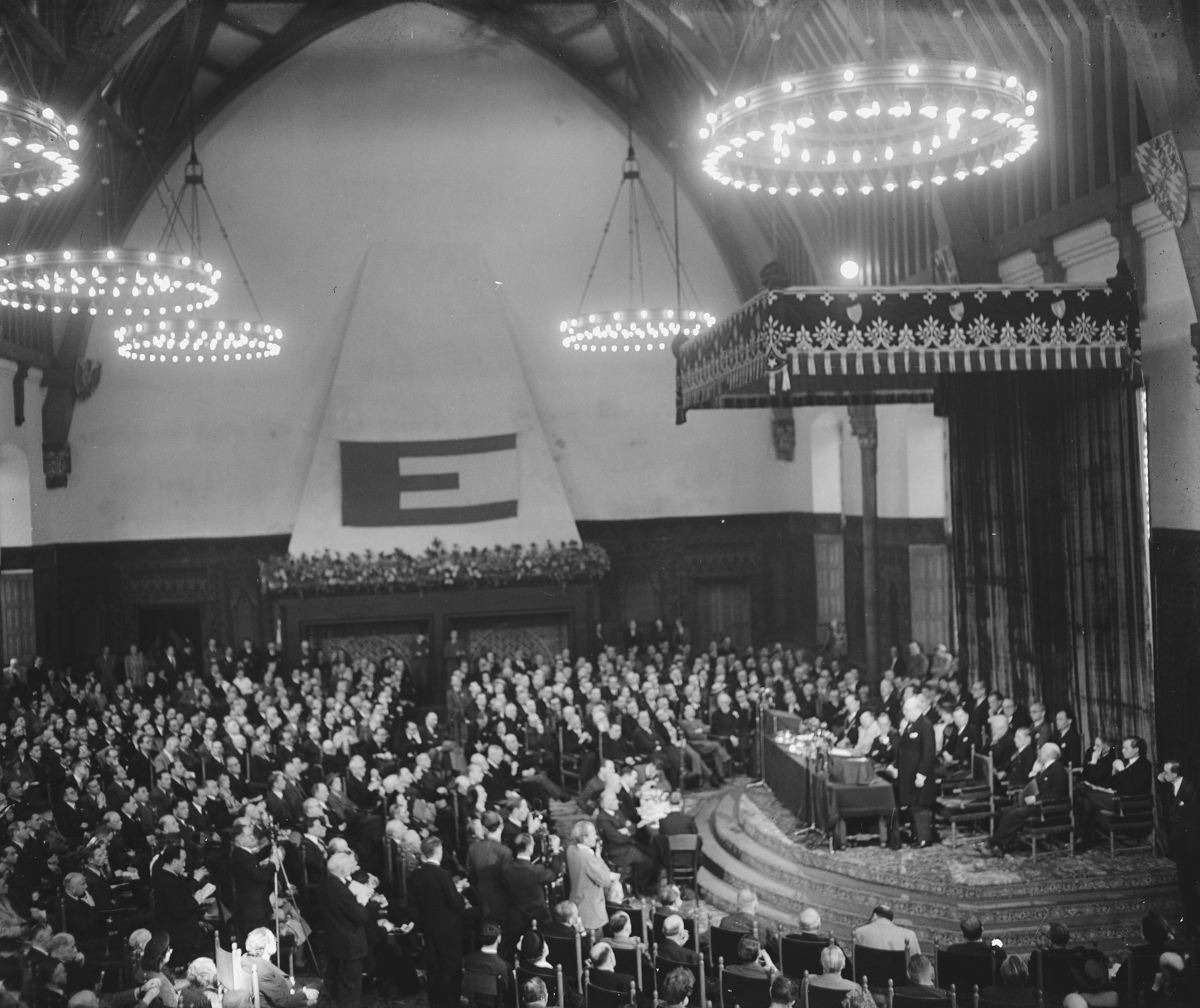
Federalist flag displayed at the 1948 Congress of Europe in the Hall of Knights in The Hague

The flag first appeared at the Congress of Europe in 1948, which was organised by the International Committee of the Movements for European Unity; however, the colour of the E was red. The congress demonstrated the first divisions between unionists and federalists (those wanting a loose union and those wanting a United States of Europe). The congress led to the creation of the European Movement and, at its first meeting in Strasbourg in September of the same year, adopted the "E" flag but changed the colour red to green. It intended the flag to be a symbol of hope for peace and unity in Europe. It is unknown who authored the flag, though it is speculated that the man most likely to have proposed it was Duncan Sandys, British Conservative and the son-in-law of Winston Churchill, who was responsible for developing the British European Movement. The flag was first flown in London in 1949 at the European economic congress.

The Council of Europe was established in 1949 as a European forum, with a stated purpose of protecting democracy and human rights. It began its search for a European flag the following year; however, the Council chose not to adopt the green "E" flag, or any other previously used flags. In 1955 it adopted a circle of twelve yellow stars upon a blue background. The European Communities, later the European Union, also chose not to use the European Movement's flag, adopting the Council of Europe's flag in 1986 on the initiative of the European Parliament. As it was not adopted by any European governmental body, and with the Council and European Union's flag being more widely recognised, the European Movement's green "E" began to be confined to the more committed federalist supporters and organisations, such as the Union of European Federalists and the Young European Federalists (though the European Movement now uses a logo based on the twelve star flag).

== Design ==
The flag is dominated by a green, elongated and rigid letter "E" upon a white background. Geometrically, the flag can be divided three ways across and five ways down, all of equal size; the "E" fills the top and bottom fifth, the left most third and one third in the third fifth from the top. The E hence fills two thirds of the area of the elongated flag.

== Symbolism ==
Today, the flag no longer simply stands for European unity, but for the political struggle for a European federation. The flag has been commonly used by citizens, hoisting it at border crossings following the Second World War, in the 1970s calling for direct European elections, by over 100,000 protesters in Milan calling for the adoption of the Spinelli Treaty (which would have created a European federation but was not adopted) and likewise by tens of thousands supporting the European Constitution at the 2000 Nice European Council. This has given it a character, unlike the European Union flag, of signifying struggle, in the fight against nationalism and against unionists who agree with European unity but are not willing to accept a federation which the federalists describe as "the self-evident consequences".

Indicating, there is a desire among federalists not to let the flag fall into disuse. It is not something that is in competition with the European Union's flag, which the federalists see as representing the status quo. Rather they desire the federalist flag to be used as a partisan flag by the federalists who desire "a democratic and efficient Europe, a Europe capable of acting in the world and adquately [sic] coping with the challenges of the 21st century, a Europe capable of defending and promoting beyond its frontiers the values of peace, humanism and progress, which constitute the common heritage of all European citizens." Furthermore, in its ideals of peace, progress, anti-nationalism and ending the division of mankind, it is also seen by some as transcending Europe's borders as a universal symbol of these values.

== See also ==
- Flag of Europe (Council of Europe and European Union)
- Flag of the Western Union
- Flag of the Western European Union
- Flag of the European Coal and Steel Community
- European Movement
- Union of European Federalists (UEF)
- History of the European Union
