= Council of Europe Archives =

Archival organization in Europe, housing the European Convention on Human Rights

Coordinates: 48.595°N 7.772°E

The Council of Europe Archives are located at the headquarters of the Organisation at the Palace of Europe in Strasbourg, France. They were set up in 1949 soon after the Organisation was created. Open to the public, they constitute a unique research source for the early history of European integration. Files are declassified under the Council of Europe's one-year, 10-year and 30-year rules, which are explained on the Archives website.

In 1960 the Archives of the Treaty of Brussels Organisation, for social and cultural activities, were transferred to the Council of Europe Archives, when the Council of Europe took over these activities.

Part of the archive collections can be searched online using the Council of Europe's Webcat database. In 2001 the Archives embarked on an ambitious programme of mass deacidification and digitisation. The Archive is best known for its files containing all the proposed designs for the Flag of Europe.

The Archives are also the repository for the instruments of ratification of the Council of Europe's international treaties, of which the best known is the European Convention on Human Rights.
