= Flag of the Western Union =

Western Union
- Use: Civil flag
- Proportion: 2∶3
- Adopted: 1949
- Design: An unbroken chain of five rectangular links Or in the shape of an upside-down pentagon on a blue field, with a multicoloured border (red on the outside, gold, black and white)

The Western Union (WU) was a military alliance established between France, the United Kingdom and the three Benelux countries (Belgium, The Netherlands and Luxemburg) between 1948 and 1954. The flag of the Western Union, also referred to as the Western Union Standard, displays an unbroken chain of five rectangular links in the shape of an upside-down pentagon on a blue field, with a multicoloured border (red on the outside, gold, black and white) taken from the WU member states' flags.

== Design ==
=== Derived colours ===
France

UK

Belgium

Netherlands

Luxembourg

=== Field (badge design) ===
The field of the flag is blue, and displays an unbroken chain of five rectangular links in the shape of an upside-down pentagon.

"[The badge of the Headquarters, Western Europe, Commanders-in-Chief] may well be regarded as the first truly international Formation Sign/Badge although the badge of Supreme Headquarters Allied Expeditionary Force (SHAEF) was worn during the war (1944–46) by British, American and other allied officers, as were also the badges of Allied Force Headquarters (AFHQ) in North Africa and Italy, and Supreme Allied Command South-East Asia (SACSEA; the H.Q. Staff of Admiral Lord Louis Mountbatten). This badge is universally worn by the joint staff of the five Western Union Powers of the Brussels Treaty (Britain, France, Belgium, Holland and Luxembourg)."

"The badge, in which the five gold links forming a pentagon on a blue background symbolize the five Western Powers, is worn on did sleeve below the shoulder tide in the same position as all British Formation."

"The badge was first seen (in Aldershot) in October, 1949, worn by Field-Marshal Viscount Montgomery when he visited the H.Q. of the Airborne Forces."

— Howard N. Cole, Badges on battledress: post-war formation signs and regimental flashes (1951)

Badge

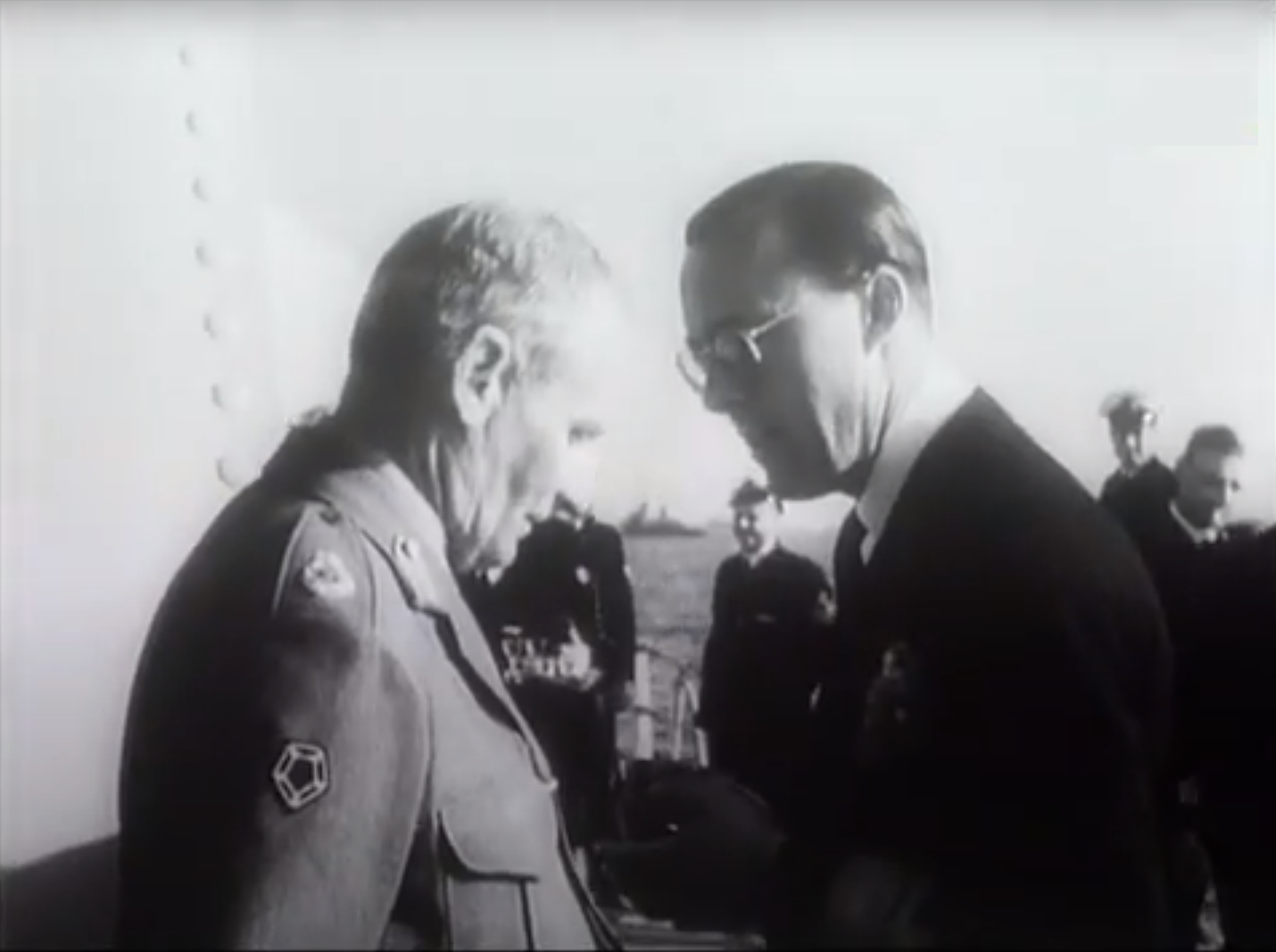
Chairman Bernard Montgomery of the C-in-C Committee wearing the badge when meeting Dutch Prince Bernhard aboard HNLMS Tromp in July 1949 during Exercise Verity.

=== Border ===
The border of the flag is multicoloured border (red on the outside, gold, black and white) taken from the WU member states' flags. The relative proportions of the border are approximatively: Red 3, each of the others 1. The total width of the border is approximatively half that of the depth of the flag. The number of links symbolises the Western Union's five members.

== History ==
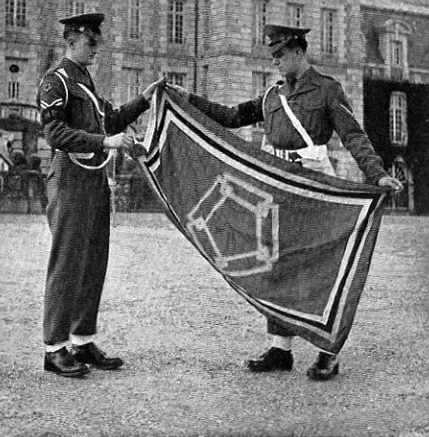
NCOs of the Corps of the Royal Military Police displaying the flag (1949)

The flag was first seen in October 1949. The flag might also have been introduced and used as a command flag of Commander in Chief Admiral of the Fleet Rhoderick McGrigor during Exercise Verity in 1949, the only major exercise held by the organisation. The flag was also flown on a car belonging to Bernard Montgomery, Chairman of the Commanders-in-Chief Committee.

A photo of the flag is shown in the book entitled Badges on Battledress by Howard N. Cole (Aldershot, Gale & Polden, 1953). The original caption states: 'NCOs of the Corps of Royal Military Police displaying the Western Union Standard which incorporates the badge of the Headquarters, Western Europe Commanders-in-Chief'. It doesn't say where the photo is taken, although it might just be Fontainebleau.

=== Modification ===
The flag ceased to be used upon the creation of NATO's Headquarters, Allied Land Forces Central Europe (AFCENT) in August 1953, at which point one extra link was added to the emblem, symbolising the United States. Similar to the Western Union, AFCENT was based in Fontainebleau, France. AFCENT was later developed into Allied Joint Force Command Brunssum (JFCBS).

== See also ==
- Flag of the Western European Union
- Flag of NATO
- Flag of the European Coal and Steel Community
- Flag of Europe
- Federalist flag
