= Paul M. G. Lévy =

Belgian journalist

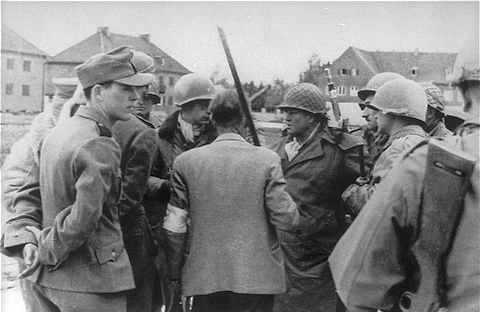
Paul Lévy (center-left, wearing helmet) pictured in his role as a journalist with American troops after the liberation of Dachau concentration camp.

Paul Michel Gabriel Lévy (27 November 1910 – 16 August 2002) was a Belgian journalist, publicist, and academic statistician.

Beginning his career in radio broadcasting, he refused to collaborate with the German authorities in World War II and was imprisoned as a political prisoner at Fort Breendonk between 1940 and 1942. He managed to escape to the United Kingdom with his family soon after his relief and worked in the entourage of the Belgian government in exile. Lévy converted to Catholicism in July 1940 and would be strongly influenced by Christian democratic ideals and would later be elected as the sole deputy for the abortive Belgian Democratic Union in 1946.

Lévy was engaged as head of the information and press section at the Council of Europe in 1949 and would later claim to have first envisaged the idea for the flag of Europe in 1955. He later taught statistics at universities in France and Belgium.

== Biography ==
=== Early life and INR ===
Paul Lévy was born into an assimilated Jewish family in Ixelles (Brussels) in Belgium on 27 November 1910. He studied commercial engineering at the Free University of Brussels where he graduated in 1930. He worked as an academic statistician.

Lévy was hired as a speaker for French language radio programmes at Belgium's recently founded public broadcaster National Institute of Radio Broadcasting (Institut national de radiodiffusion, INR) in 1933. His career at the INR meant that he had gained a public profile within Belgium by the late 1930s.

=== World War II ===
During the German invasion of Belgium, Lévy was delegated to follow the Pierlot government to France by the INR. Despite the threat he faced from Nazi persecution, he returned to German-occupied Belgium in July 1940 where he converted to Catholicism. In August 1940, he informed the German occupation authorities that he refused to return to his former post within the INR as a form of passive resistance.

Lévy was arrested in September 1940 and, two months later, was transferred to the prison camp established at Fort Breendonk as a political prisoner and a Jew. He was held with other prisoners in poor conditions and his health deteriorated. The underground newspaper La Libre Belgique incorrectly reported that Lévy had died at Breendonk and this was repeated by the London-based Radio Belgique in broadcasts in October 1941. Seeking to rebut the allegation of ill-treatment, Lévy was released in November 1941.

Lévy continued to refuse any radio work and ultimately went into hiding with his family. Aided by the Service Zero resistance group, they were able to travel illegally to neutral Portugal in July 1942 in order to reach the Belgian government in the United Kingdom. In London, Lévy worked on various government projects and made a number of broadcasts on Radio Belgique and the BBC European Service. By the summer of 1943, he had joined the office of the Christian democratic politician Antoine Delfosse.

Following the invasion of Europe by the Allies, he returned to the continent working as an interpreter and press officer alongside General Henning Linden. His coverage included the liberation of Dachau concentration camp.

=== Political career ===
Flag of Europe as drawn up by Lévy in 1955 (since 1993 the flag used by the European Union)

After the Liberation of Belgium, Lévy was active in Delfosse's newly formed Belgian Democratic Union which was a new major left-leaning Christian party. He was ultimately elected as the UDB's sole deputy in the 1946 elections for the Arrondissement of Nivelles but never assumed the role and returned to his work at the INR.

=== Council of Europe ===
Drawing on his connections to the wartime minister Paul-Henri Spaak, Lévy became information and press director at the Council of Europe in 1949. Lévy would later claim that he had invented the "circle of stars" adopted as the flag of the Council of Europe by Arsène Heitz in 1955. This is considered uncertain.

According to an anecdote published in 1998 in Die Welt, Lévy passed a statue of the Virgin Mary with a halo of stars and was struck by the way the stars, reflecting the sun, glowed against the blue of the sky. Lévy later visited Léon Marchal, the then Secretary General of the Council of Europe, and suggested that he should propose twelve golden stars on a blue ground as the motif for the flag of Europe.

On the other hand, a 2004 article in The Economist attributed a statement to Heitz, in which he claims to have been inspired by Revelations 12:1. Lévy has stated that he was only informed of the connection to the Book of Revelation after it was chosen.

=== Later life ===
Continuing his work on statistics, Lévy was a professor at the University of Strasbourg and the Catholic University of Louvain-la-Neuve throughout the 1960s and 1970s. He wrote widely on various aspects of statistics and sociology in addition to popular works on World War II in Belgium.

Lévy was instrumental in having Fort Breendonk preserved as a national memorial in 1947 and served as its first conservator from 1948 to 1949.

He died in Sainte-Ode on 16 August 2002.

He is said to have invented the neologism Irénologie which is the French term for the study of Peace.
