= Flag of the European Coal and Steel Community =

European Coal and Steel Community
- Use: Civil flag
- Proportion: 2:3
- Adopted: 1958 (original design); 1986 (final design)
- Relinquished: 23 July 2002
- Design: Blue and black horizontal strips with six gold; or nine, ten or twelve white (depending on version) stars in two lines across each stripe.

The flag of the European Coal and Steel Community was a horizontal bicolour flag defaced with stars which represented the European Coal and Steel Community (ECSC) between 1958 (six years after the ECSC was founded) until 2002 when the Community was merged into the European Union (EU). Prior to 1958 the ECSC did not have a flag, and no other flag has been used by a historical part of the European Union other than the flag of Europe.

== Design ==
The flag consisted of two horizontal stripes, blue on the top and black on the bottom. Black stood for coal while the blue stood for steel, the two resources the community managed. There were a number of gold, later white, stars equivalent to the number of states belonging to the community (until 1986, when the number was frozen at twelve). These stars were equally divided between each strip, aligned close to the centre border (if there were an odd number of stars, then the smaller number would be on the top stripe.

== History ==
The flag was first unveiled at the 1958 Exposition in Brussels, seven years after the establishment of the Community. At Expo, its rivalling flag, the flag of Europe, was also on one of its first public displays.

The number of stars began at six and increased with the membership of the Community until 1986 when it reached twelve. After this it was decided not to increase the number of stars to reflect the new members joining in the 1990s. This kept it inline with the flag of Europe (used by its sister organisations) which displayed twelve stars representing perfection and unity.

The Treaty of Paris setting up the ECSC expired on 23 July 2002 and the ECSC ceased to exist. On this day the ECSC flag outside the European Commission in Brussels was lowered for the final time by President Romano Prodi and replaced with the EU flag.

An original copy of the flag of the ECSC with 12 stars is displayed in the office of the President of the European University Institute in Florence, Prof. J. H.H. Weiler.

=== Evolution of designs ===
Number of stars	Design	Member states represented by added stars (prior to 1986)	Duration
Six		The Inner Six: Belgium, France, West Germany, Italy, Luxembourg and the Netherlands	1958 – 31 December 1972
Nine		Denmark, Ireland and the United Kingdom	1 January 1973 – 31 December 1980
Ten		Greece	1 January 1981 – 31 December 1985
Twelve		Portugal and Spain (the number of stars was subsequently fixed at twelve; the principle of having one star per member state was thus abandoned).	1 January 1986 – 23 July 2002

== See also ==
- Flag of Europe
- Flag of the Western Union
- Flag of the Western European Union
- Federalist flag
