= Flag of Europe =

- European flag Flag of the Council of Europe; Flag of the European Union; Circle of stars
- Use: Symbol of Europe; Union flag representing the EU (27 members); Council flag representing the Council of Europe (46 members)
- Proportion: 2∶3
- Adopted: 9 December 1955 (CoE); 29 June 1985 (EEC)
- Design: A circle of twelve five-pointed yellow stars on a blue field ("Azure, twelve mullets Or in annulo")

The flag of Europe or European flag (Note: Alternatively, it is sometimes called the flag of the European Union when representing the EU. The name "flag of the European Union" is used in e.g. the Italian law no. 22 of 5 February 1998 (bandiera dell'Unione europea), and by the Centre virtuel de la connaissance sur l'Europe (Le drapeau de l'Union européenne, 2016).) consists of a navy blue flag with twelve golden stars in a circle. It was adopted in 1955 by the Council of Europe (CoE) as a symbol for the whole of Europe after an open design process, and chosen from a list of finalists by the Council.

Since 1985, the flag has also been a symbol of the European Union (EU), whose 27 member states are all also CoE members, although in that year the EU had not yet assumed its present name or constitutional form (which came in steps in 1993 and 2009). Adoption by the EU, or European Community (EC), the EU's predecessor, reflected a long-standing CoE desire to see the flag used by other European organisations. Official use by the EU widened greatly in the 1990s. Nevertheless, the flag has to date received no status in any of the EU's treaties. Its adoption as an official symbol was planned as part of the 2004 Treaty establishing a Constitution for Europe but this failed to be ratified. Mention of the flag was removed in 2007 from the text of the Treaty of Lisbon, which was ratified. On the other hand, 16 EU members that year, plus France in 2017, have officially affirmed (by Declaration No. 5224) their attachment to the flag as an EU symbol.

The flag is used by other European entities, such as unified golf teams under the rubric Team Europe, and the logo for Creative Europe Media.

== Design ==
=== Specifications ===
Flag construction sheet

According to graphical specifications published online by the Council of Europe in 2004, the flag is rectangular with 2:3 proportions: its fly (width) is one and a half times the length of its hoist (height). Twelve yellow stars are centred in a circle (the radius of which is a third of the length of the hoist) upon a blue background. All the stars are upright (one point straight up), have five points and are spaced equally, like the hour positions on the face of a clock. The diameter of each star is equal to one-ninth of the height of the hoist.

The colours are regulated in the 1996 guide by the EC, and in the 2004 guide by the Council of Europe. The base colour of the flag is defined as Pantone "Reflex Blue", while the golden stars are portrayed in Pantone "Yellow":

	Azure	Gold
Pantone	Reflex Blue	Yellow
HEX	#003399	#FFCC00
CMYK	100.80.0.0	0.21.100.0

The 2013 logo of the Council of Europe has the colours:

	Azure	Gold
Pantone	PMS 287	PMS 116
HEX	#1E448A	#FDCB0B
CMYK	100.67.0.40	0.20.100.0

=== Blazon ===
The blazon given by the EU in 1996 describes the design as: "On an azure field a circle of twelve golden mullets, their points not touching."

=== Symbolism ===
The flag used is the Flag of Europe, which consists of a circle of twelve golden stars on a blue background. Originally designed in 1955 for the Council of Europe, the flag was adopted by the European Economic Community, the predecessor of the present European Union, in 1986. The Council of Europe gave the flag a symbolic description in the following terms, though the official symbolic description adopted by the EU omits the reference to the "Western world":

Against the blue sky of the Western world, the stars symbolise the peoples of Europe in a form of a circle, a sign of union. Their number is invariably twelve, the figure twelve being the symbol of perfection and entirety.

— Council of Europe. Paris, 7–9 December 1955.

Other symbolic interpretations have been offered based on the account of its design by Paul M. Lévy. The five-pointed star is used on many national flags and represents aspiration and education. Their golden colour is that of the sun, which is said to symbolise glory and enlightenment.

Their arrangement in a circle represents the constellation of Corona Borealis and can be seen as a crown and the stability of government. The blue background resembles the sky and symbolises truth and the intellect. It is also the colour traditionally used to represent the Virgin Mary. In many paintings of the Virgin Mary as Stella Maris she is crowned with a circle of twelve stars.

There is some controversy in the vexillology community, with some prominent scholars arguing that designers Arsène Heitz and Paul M. G. Lévy drew inspiration from the circular pattern of stars on the Betsy Ross flag, the early flag of the United States, representing the first thirteen states to make up the Union.

==== Marian interpretation ====
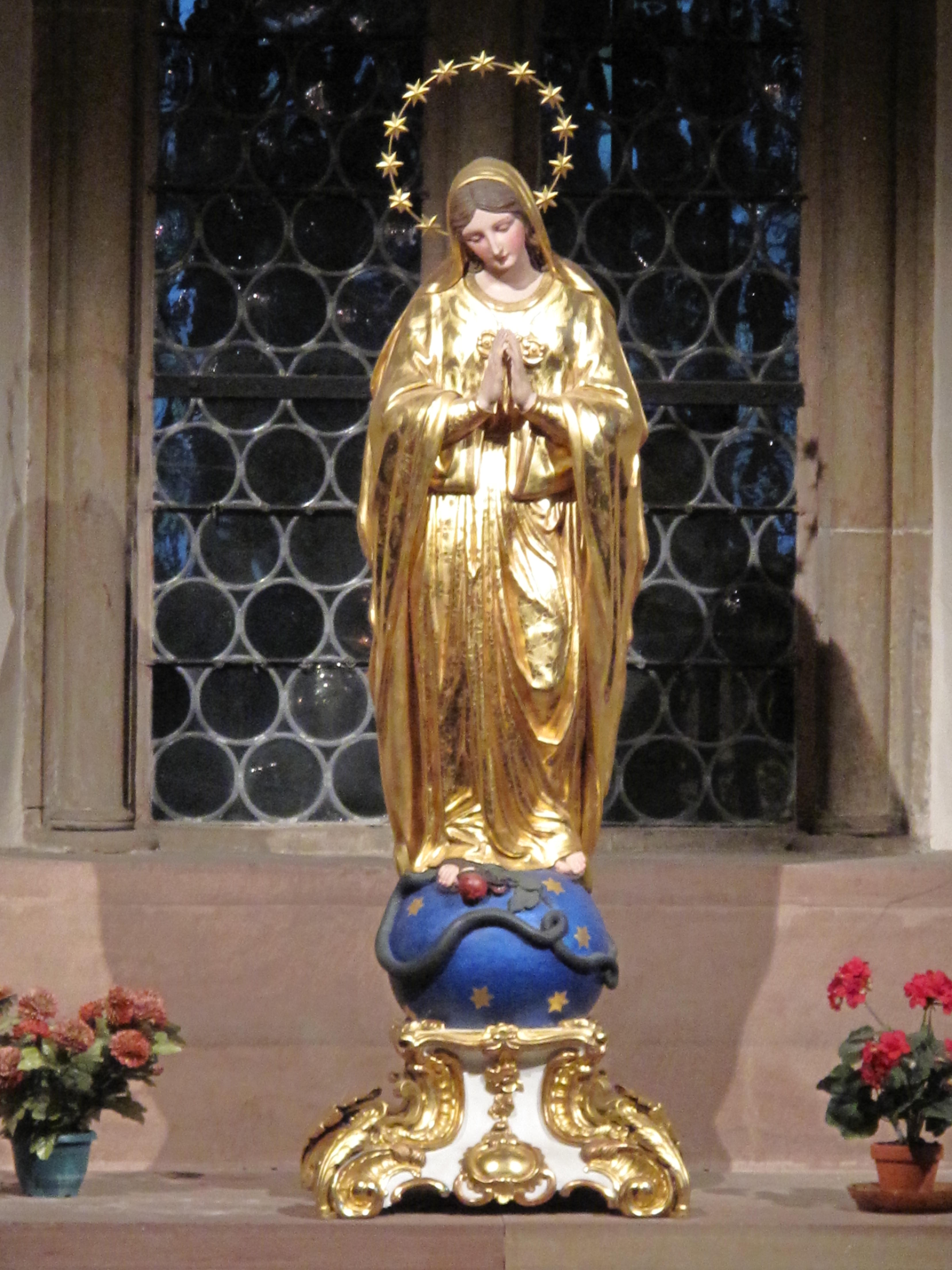
Statue of the Blessed Virgin in Strasbourg Cathedral (1859)

Arms of monk and priest Prosper Guéranger (1805–1875)

In 1987, following the adoption of the flag by the EC, Arsène Heitz, one of the designers who had submitted proposals for the flag's design, suggested a religious inspiration for it. He stated that the circle of stars was based on the iconographic tradition of showing the Blessed Virgin Mary as the Woman of the Apocalypse, wearing a "crown of twelve stars".

Heitz also made a connection to the date of the flag's adoption, 8 December 1955, coinciding with the Feast of the Immaculate Conception of the Blessed Virgin Mary.

Paul M. G. Lévy, then Director of Information at the Council of Europe responsible for designing the flag, in a 1989 statement maintained that he had not been aware of any religious connotations.

In an interview given 26 February 1998, Lévy denied not only awareness of the Marian connection, but also denied that the final design of a circle of twelve stars was Heitz's. To the question "Who really designed the flag?" Lévy replied:

I did, and I calculated the proportions to be used for the geometric design. Arsène Heitz, who was an employee in the mail service, put in all sorts of proposals, including the 15-star design. But he submitted too many designs. He wanted to do the European currencies with 15 stars in the corner. He wanted to do national flags incorporating the Council of Europe flag.

Carlo Curti Gialdino (2005) has reconstructed the design process to the effect that Heitz's proposal contained varying numbers of stars, from which the version with twelve stars was chosen by the Committee of Ministers meeting at Deputy level in January 1955 as one out of two remaining candidate designs.

Lévy's 1998 interview apparently gave rise to a new variant of the Marian anecdote. An article published in Die Welt in August 1998 alleged that it was Lévy himself who was inspired to introduce a Marian element as he walked past a statue of the Blessed Virgin Mary.

An article posted in La Raison in February 2000 further connected the donation of a stained glass window for Strasbourg Cathedral by the Council of Europe on 21 October 1956. This window, a work by Parisian master Max Ingrand, shows the Madonna underneath a circle of 12 stars on dark blue ground. The overall design of the Madonna is inspired by the banner of the cathedral's Congrégation Mariale des Hommes, and the twelve stars are found on the statue venerated by this congregation inside the cathedral (twelve is also the number of members of the congregation's council). The Regional Office for Cultural Affairs describe this stained glass window called "Le vitrail de l'Europe de Max Ingrand" (The Glass Window of Europe of Max Ingrand).

== History and usage ==
The twelve-star flag of Europe was designed in 1950 and officially adopted by the Council of Europe in 1955. The same flag was adopted by the European Parliament in 1983. The European Council adopted it as an "emblem" for the European Communities in 1985. Its status in the European Communities was inherited by the European Union upon its formation in 1993. The proposal to adopt it as official flag of the European Union failed with the ratification of the European Constitution in 2005, and mention of all emblems suggesting statehood was removed from the Treaty of Lisbon of 2007, although sixteen member states signed a declaration supporting the continued use of the flag. In 2007, the European Parliament officially adopted the flag for its own use.

=== Pan-European flags before 1950 ===
Proposed flag of Europe from an anonymous pan-European brochure from 1920 (obverse)

Proposed flag of Europe from an anonymous pan-European brochure from 1920 (reverse)

Anonymous sketch flag for the United States of Europe from 1930

Hertensteiner Cross (14-24 September 1946)

Flag of the European Movement

=== 1950–present: Council of Europe ===
The Council of Europe in 1950 appointed a committee to study the question of adopting a symbol. Numerous proposals were looked into.

Kalergi's Paneuropean Union proposal

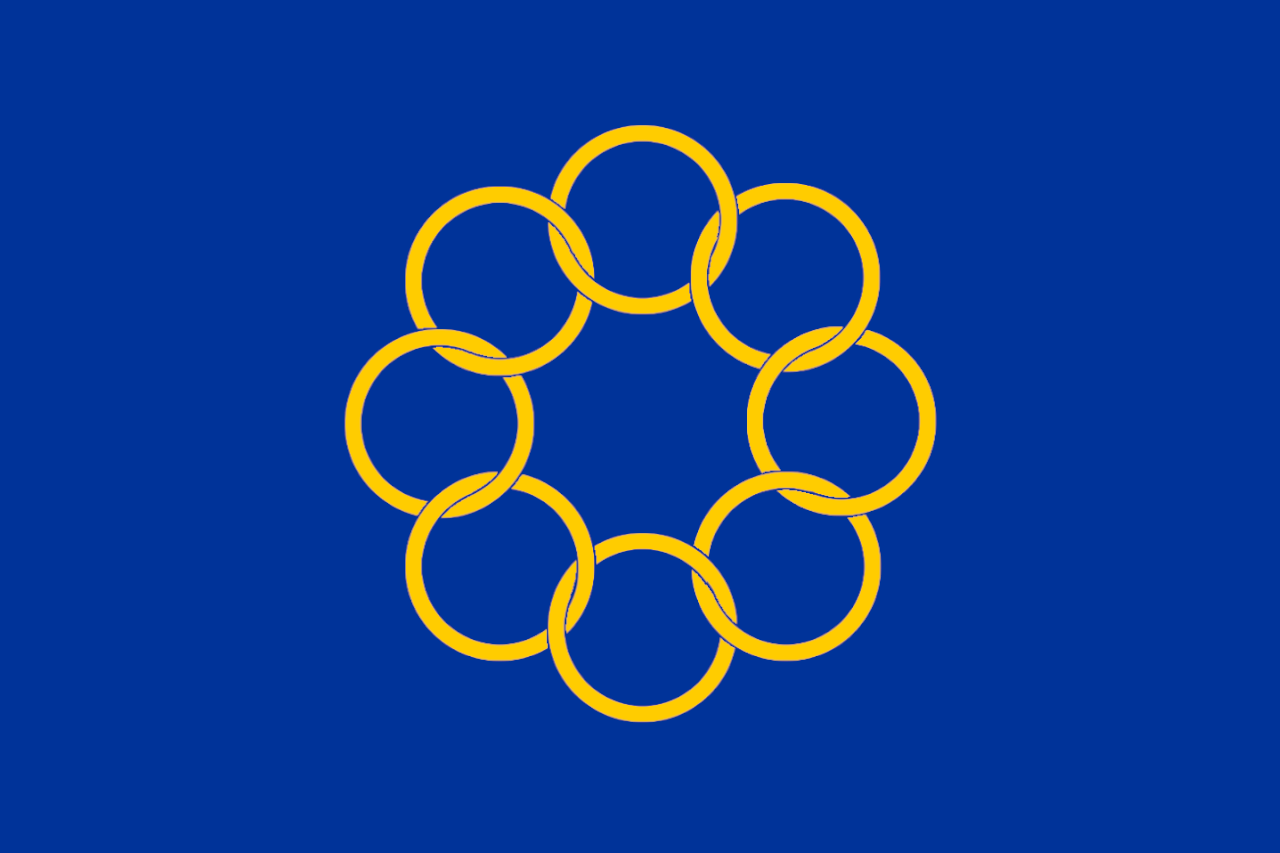
"Eight rings" proposal, reminiscent of the Western Union Standard

"Single-star" proposal

Among the unsuccessful proposals was the flag of Richard von Coudenhove-Kalergi's International Paneuropean Union, which he had himself recently adopted for the European Parliamentary Union. The design was a blue field with a red cross inside an orange circle at the centre. Kalergi was very committed to defending the cross as "the great symbol of Europe's moral unity", the Red Cross in particular being "recognized by the whole world, by Christian and non-Christian nations[,] as a symbol of international charity and of the brotherhood of man", but the proposal was rejected by Turkey (a member of the Council of Europe since 1949) on grounds of its religious associations in spite of Kalergi's suggestion of adding a crescent alongside the cross to overcome the Muslim objections.

Other proposals included the flag was the European Movement, which had a large green "E" on a white background, a design was based on the Olympic rings, eight golden rings on a blue background, rejected due to the rings' similarity with "dial", "chain" and "zeros", or a large yellow star on a blue background, rejected due to its equality with the flag of the Belgian Congo.

Madariaga's "constellation" proposal

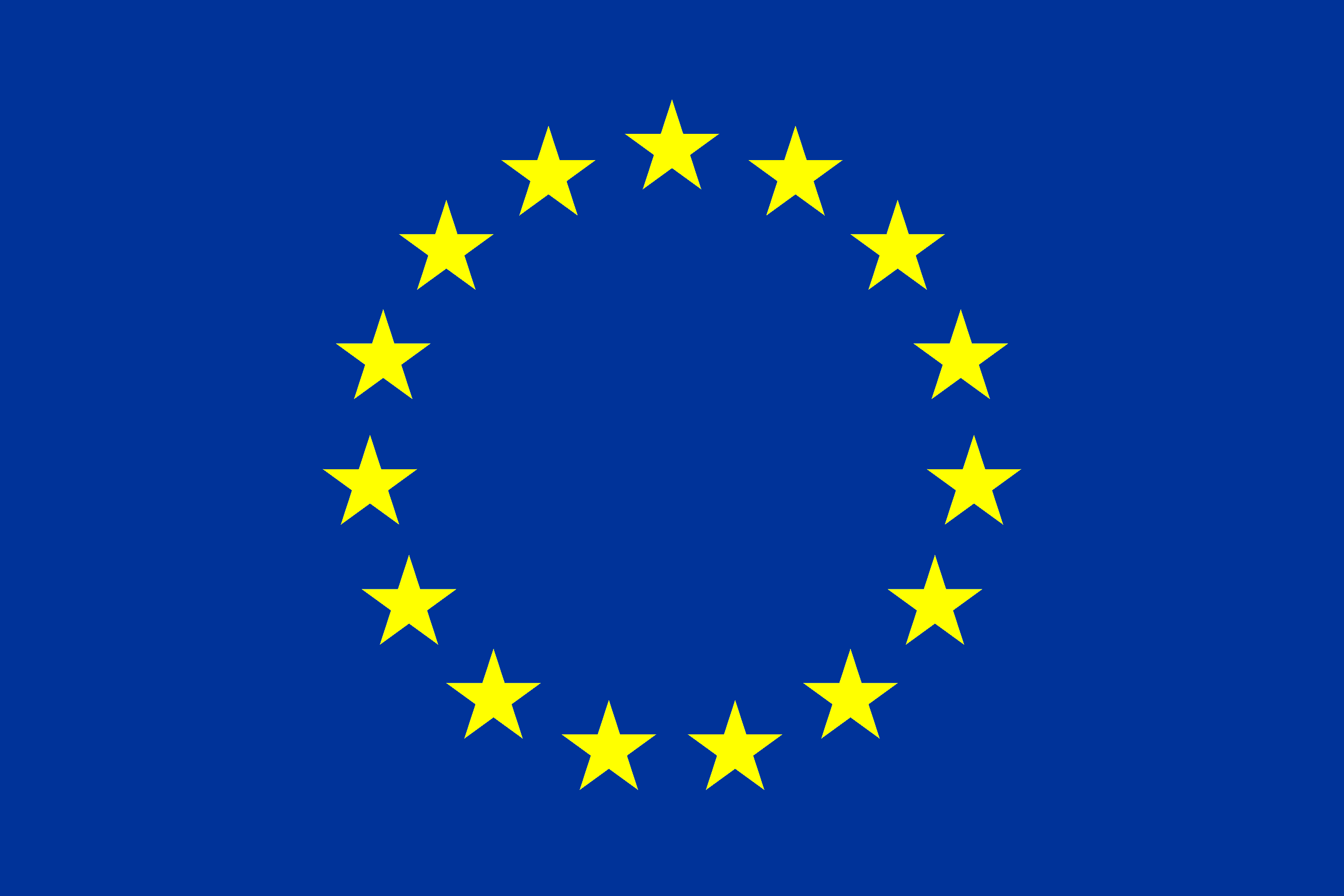
Fifteen-star proposal adopted by the Consultative Assembly in 1953

The Consultative Assembly narrowed their choice to two designs. One was by Salvador de Madariaga, the founder of the College of Europe, who suggested a constellation of stars on a blue background (positioned according to capital cities, with a large star for Strasbourg, the seat of the council). He had circulated his flag round many European capitals and the concept had found favour. The second was a variant by Arsène Heitz, who worked for the council's postal service and had submitted dozens of designs, one of which was accepted by the Assembly. The design was similar to Salvador de Madariaga's, but rather than a constellation, the stars were arranged in a circle. Arsène Heitz was one of several people who proposed a circle of gold stars on a blue background. None of his proposals perfectly match the design that was adopted. Paul Lévy claims that he was the one who designed the template for the flag, not Arsène Heitz. In 1987, Heitz would claim that his inspiration had been the crown of twelve stars of the Woman of the Apocalypse, often found in Marian iconography (see above).

On 25 September 1953, the Consultative Assembly of the Council of Europe recommended that a blue flag with fifteen gold stars be adopted as an emblem for the organisation, the number fifteen reflecting the number of states of the Council of Europe. West Germany objected to the fifteen-star design, as one of the members was Saar Protectorate, and to have its own star would imply sovereignty for the region. The Committee of Ministers (the council's main decision-making body) agreed with the Assembly that the flag should be a circle of stars, but opted for a fixed number of twelve stars, "representing perfection and entirety". The Parliamentary Assembly of the Council of Europe on 25 October 1955 agreed to this. Paul M. G. Lévy drew up the exact design of the new flag. Officially adopted on 8 December 1955, the flag was unveiled at the Château de la Muette in Paris on 13 December 1955.

==== Alternative proposals from the 1950s ====
For the flag of the Council of Europe, many stylistic proposals were made in regards to colours and symbolism. These initial proposals were made on 19 January 1950 by Paul Lévy in a letter to the Secretary-General. He proposed that the flag should contain a cross for several reasons. Firstly, the cross symbolizes roads crossing, and also represents the east, the west, the north, and the south with its arms. Furthermore, the cross appears in most of the European Council members' flags, and it is the oldest and most noble symbol in Europe. Moreover, the cross depicted Christianity. As far as the colours are concerned, he proposed them to be white and green, the colours of the Flag of the European Movement. Green also symbolized hope, and the green cross over a white background was a design that had not been used yet. Finally, Lévy proposed that the arms of Strasbourg was an important element to be added as it represented where the council would be, and being located in the heart of the cross meant that the council was the point where the European roads met.

Shortly after this design considerations by Paul Lévy, on 27 July 1950, Richard Coudenhove-Kalergi, president of the Pan-European movement wrote a memorandum which contained some rules that a flag for such union should follow. The rules he stated where:

- It should be a symbol of our common civilisation.
- It should present a European emblem.
- It should not provoke any national rivalry.
- It should represent tradition.
- It should be beautiful and dignified.

After these statements, Coudenhove-Kalergi proposed that the Pan-European movement flag would be the perfect one to fit these criteria

15 July 1951, the consultative assembly put forward a final memorandum on the European flag. The symbols proposed where the following

- A cross: Symbol of Christianity, Europe's crossroads, reminiscent of the crusades, and present in half of the member state's flags.
- An "E": Used by the European Movement.
- A white star in a circle: Symbol used in 1944–45 by the armies of liberation.
- Multiple stars: Each star could represent a member. They could be green on a white background, white stars on a red background, or silver stars for associate members, and golden stars for full members.
- Strasbourg's Coat of Arms: To symbolize the official seat of the Council of Europe.
- A sun: It would represent dawning hope.
- A triangle: It would represent culture.

Furthermore, several colours were also proposed:

- Multi-coloured: It was proposed that the flag could contain all the colours the flags of the member states had.
- Green and White: These were the colours of the European Movement.
- Blue: Symbol of peace and neutrality, as other colours were already used for other movements such as black for mourning, red for bolshevism, or green for Islam.

Richard Coudenhove-Kalergi

Richard Coudenhove-Kalergi consistently proposed choosing a flag with a red cross. In addition to the blue flag of the Pan-European movement with a yellow circle, he also presented the white flag with such cross.

5 June 1950

15 July 1951

26 September 1951

15 October 1951

Exact date unknown

Arsène Heitz

Council of Europe postal worker Arsène Heitz presented many flag concepts, mostly blue flags with stars or compass rose. Sometimes his designs included a space where the national flag of the country in which it was used would be placed. In addition to the blue flags, he also proposed green-red-yellow flags inspired by the medieval French banner known as Oriflamme. Red depicts the bloodshed in fratricidal struggles and yellow being the colour of the Pope and Christianity.

15 October 1951

1951

1951

5 January 1952

15 November 1952

15 November 1952

15 November 1952

12 November 1954

12 November 1954

25 December 1954

25 December 1954

25 December 1954

11 September 1955

11 September 1955

11 September 1955

11 September 1955

11 September 1955

11 September 1955

Exact date unknown

Exact date unknown

Exact date unknown

Exact date unknown

Exact date unknown

Exact date unknown

Hanno Konopath

Star circles were also proposed by Hanno F. Konopath in 1952.

1952

1952

1952

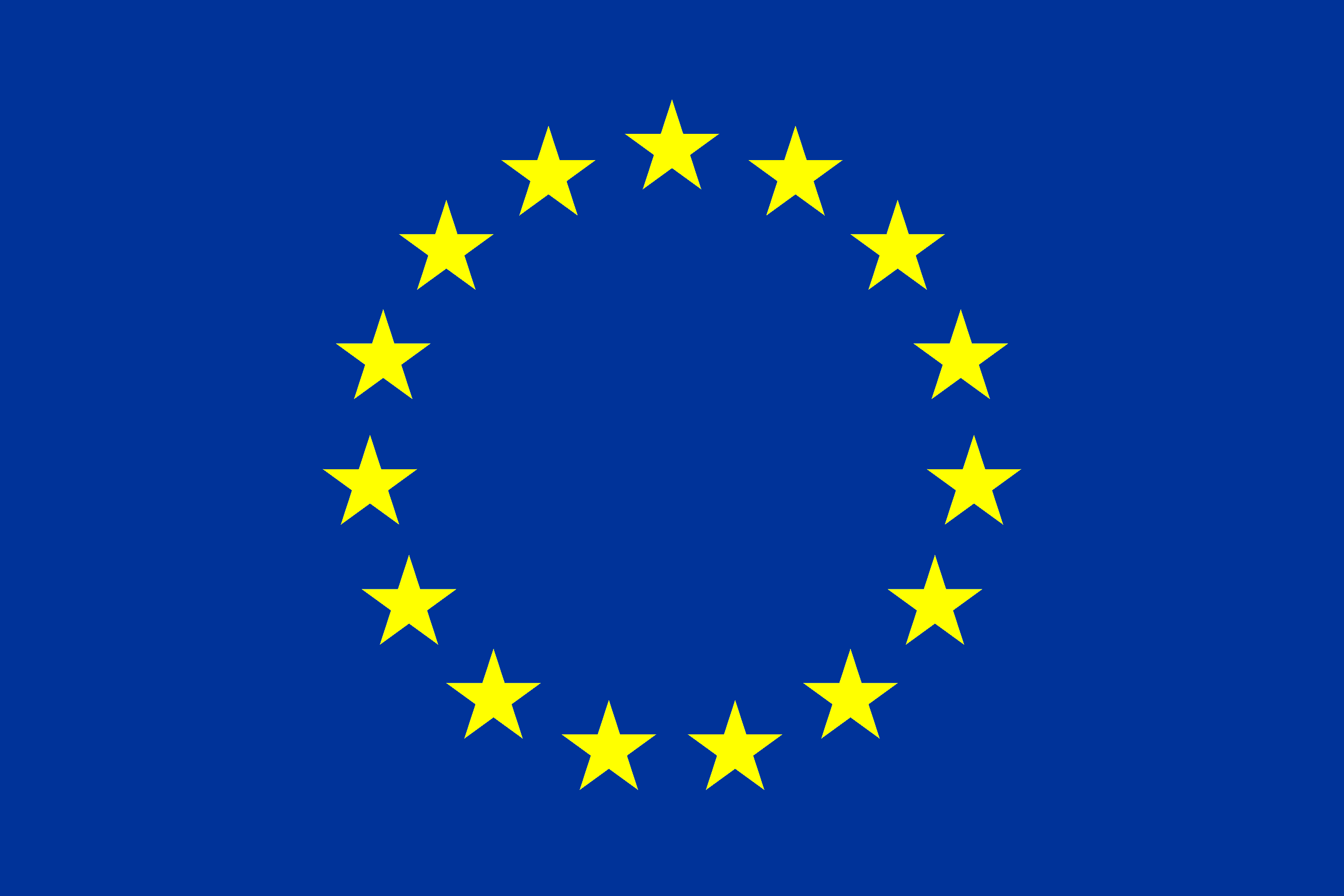
1953

Additional minor proposals

In the 1950s, during the Council of Europe's selection process, a number of additional designs were submitted. These designs were created by lesser-known designers, including private individuals from across Europe who submitted their proposals by post. The gallery below presents these archived designs.

Image gallery (rolled up)

Joseph Oberson-Bagnolet

1951

1951

1951

J. E. Dynan

1951

1951

1951

1951

1951

Gambin Gaetano

1955

1955

1955

1955

1955

1955

1955

Alwin Mondon

15 July 1951

1951

1951

1951

1951

1951

1951

1951

1951

1951

1951

1951

Muller of Wiesbaden

15 July 1951

15 July 1951

Wolfram Neue

1951

1951

1951

1951

Michel Pélot

1951

1951

Lucien Philippe

1951

1951

1951

1951

1951

1951

Walther Timm

1951

1951

1951

1951

Louis Wirion

15 July 1951

15 July 1951

26 September 1951

26 September 1951

1951

Other

Bichet's (September 1953)

G. A. Bornemann Proposal (1952)

H.C. Blue-red flag is the international code sign of the letter "E". (15 July 1951)

Harmignies (15 July 1951)

Paul Lévy (12 May 1952)

Adolf Lorder (1950s)

Martin-Lévy (15 July 1951)

Camille Manné (23 August 1949)

Joseph Oberson-Bagnolet (1952)

Poucher (1951)

Prince de Schwarzenberg (1951)

Sommier of Neuilly (1951)

Mirko Svetkov (1951)

August Vincent (1950)

Lex Weyer (1951)

Werner S. Wulfing (1949)

Anonymous

1950s

1950s

1950s

1950s

1950s

1950s

1950s

1950s

1950s

1950s

1950s

1950s

1950s

1950s

1950s

1950s

1950s

1950s

1950s

1950s

1950s

1950s

1950s

1950s

1950s

1950s

1950s

1950s

1950s

=== 1983–present: From European Communities to European Union ===
Vertical flag of Europe

Following Expo 58 in Brussels, the flag caught on and the Council of Europe lobbied for other European organisations to adopt the flag as a sign of European unity. The European Parliament took the initiative in seeking a flag to be adopted by the European Communities. Shortly after the first direct elections in 1979 a draft resolution was put forward on the issue. The resolution proposed that the Communities' flag should be that of the Council of Europe and it was adopted by the Parliament on 11 April 1983.

Wim Schuijt proposed flag for the European Communities (19 November 1960)

"Flag and emblem" for the European Communities proposed in the 1985 Adonnino Report

The June 1984 European Council (the Communities' leaders) summit in Fontainebleau stressed the importance of promoting a European image and identity to citizens and the world. The European Council appointed an ad hoc committee, named "Committee for 'a People's Europe'" (Adonnino Committee).

This committee submitted a substantial report, including wide-ranging suggestions, from organising a "European lottery" to campaigning for the introduction of local voting rights for foreign nationals throughout Europe. Under the header of "strengthening of the Community's image and identity", the Committee suggested the introduction of "a flag and an emblem", recommending a design based on the Council of Europe flag, but with the addition of "a gold letter E" in the center of the circle of stars. The European Council held in Milan on 28/29 June 1985 largely followed the recommendations of the Adonnino Committee. But as the adoption of a flag was strongly reminiscent of a national flag representing statehood and was extremely controversial with some member states (in particular the United Kingdom, as the proposed flag closely resembled the Queen's personal standard), the Council of Europe's "flag of Europe" design was adopted, without the letter E, only with the official status of a "logo". This compromise was widely disregarded from the beginning, and the "European logo", in spite of the explicit language of giving it the status of a "logo", was referred to as the "Community flag" or even "European flag" from the outset.

The Communities began to use the "emblem" as its de facto flag from 1986, raising it outside the Berlaymont building (the seat of the European Commission) for the first time on 29 May 1986.

The European Union, which was established by the Maastricht Treaty in 1992 to replace the European Communities and encompass its functions, has retained de facto use of the "Community logo" of the EC. Technically and officially, the "European flag" as used by the European Union remains not a "flag" but "a Community 'logo' — or 'emblem' — [...] eligible to be reproduced on rectangular pieces of fabric".

In 1997, the "Central and Eastern Eurobarometer" poll included a section intending to "discover the level of public awareness of the European Union" in what were then candidate countries in Central and Eastern Europe. Interviewees were shown "a sticker of the European flag" and asked to identify it. Responses considered correct were: the European Union, the European Community, the Common Market, and "Europe in general". 52% of those interviewed gave one of the correct answers, 15% gave a wrong answer (naming another institution, such as NATO or the United Nations), and 35% could or would not identify it.

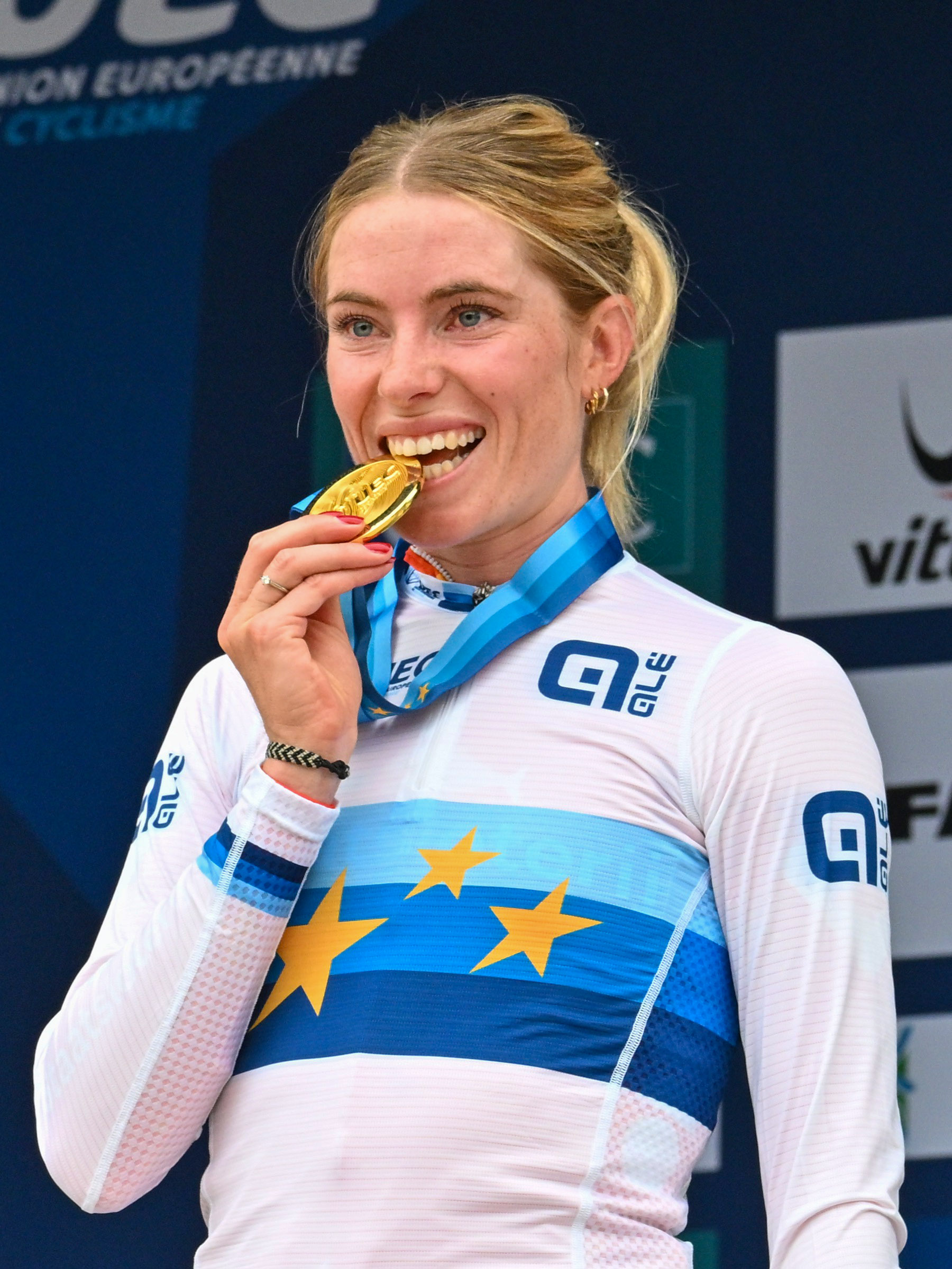
Demi Vollering, wearing the 2026 European championship medal and jersey

The European Cycling Union, established in 1990, uses the blue and yellow stars with includes lighter shades of blue and tilted stars in its logo. The same design elements are seen on championship jerseys and medals awarded to the winners of annual championships.

The "flag barcode"

In 2002, Dutch architect Rem Koolhaas designed a symbol, dubbed the "barcode", which displayed the colours of the national flags of the EU member states in vertical stripes. It was reported as a replacement for the European flag, which was not the intention. It was not adopted by the EU or any other organisation at the time, but an updated version was used in the visual identity of the Austrian EU Presidency in 2006.

The official status of the emblem as the flag of the European Union was to be formalised as part of the Treaty establishing a Constitution for Europe. However, as the proposed treaty failed ratification, the mention of all state-like emblems, including the flag, were not included in the replacement Treaty of Lisbon, which entered into force in 2009.

Instead, a separate declaration by sixteen Member States was included in the final act of the Treaty of Lisbon stating that the flag, the anthem, the motto and the currency and Europe Day "will for them continue as symbols to express the sense of community of the people in the European Union and their allegiance to it."

In reaction to the removal of the flag from the treaty, the European Parliament, which had supported the inclusion of such symbols, backed a proposal to use these symbols "more often" on behalf of the Parliament itself; Jo Leinen, MEP for Germany, suggested that the Parliament should take "an avant-garde role" in their use.

In September 2008, the Parliament's Committee on Constitutional Affairs proposed a formal change in the institution's rules of procedure to make "better use of the symbols". Specifically, the flag would be present in all meeting rooms (not just the hemicycle) and at all official events. The proposal was passed on 8 October 2008 by 503 votes to 96 (15 abstentions).

In 2015, a set of commemorative Euro coins was issued on the occasion of the 30th anniversary of the adoption of the emblem by the European Communities.

In April 2004, the European flag was flown on behalf of the European Space Agency, by Dutch astronaut André Kuipers while on board the International Space Station, in reference to the Framework Agreement establishing the legal basis for co-operation between the European Space Agency and the European Union.

Following the 2004 Summer Olympics, President Romano Prodi expressed his hope "to see the EU Member State teams in Beijing [viz., the 2008 games] carry the flag of the European Union alongside their own national flag as a symbol of our unity". Use of the flag has also been reported as representing the European team at the Ryder Cup golf competition in the early 2000s, although most European participants preferred to use their own national flags.

The flag has been widely used by advocates of European integration since the late 1990s or early 2000s. It is often displayed in the context of Europe Day, on 9 May. Outside the EU, it was used in the context of several of the "colour revolutions" during the 2000s. In Belarus, it was used on protest marches alongside the white-red-white flag and other flags of opposition movements, such as Zubr, during the protests of 2004–2006. The flag was used widely in a 2007 pro-EU march in Minsk. Similar uses were reported from Moldova in 2009.

In Georgia, the flag has been on most government buildings since the coming to power of Mikheil Saakashvili (2007), who used it during his inauguration, stating: "[the European] flag is Georgia's flag as well, as far as it embodies our civilisation, our culture, the essence of our history and perspective, and our vision for the future of Georgia."

It was used in 2008 by pro-western Serbian voters ahead of an election.

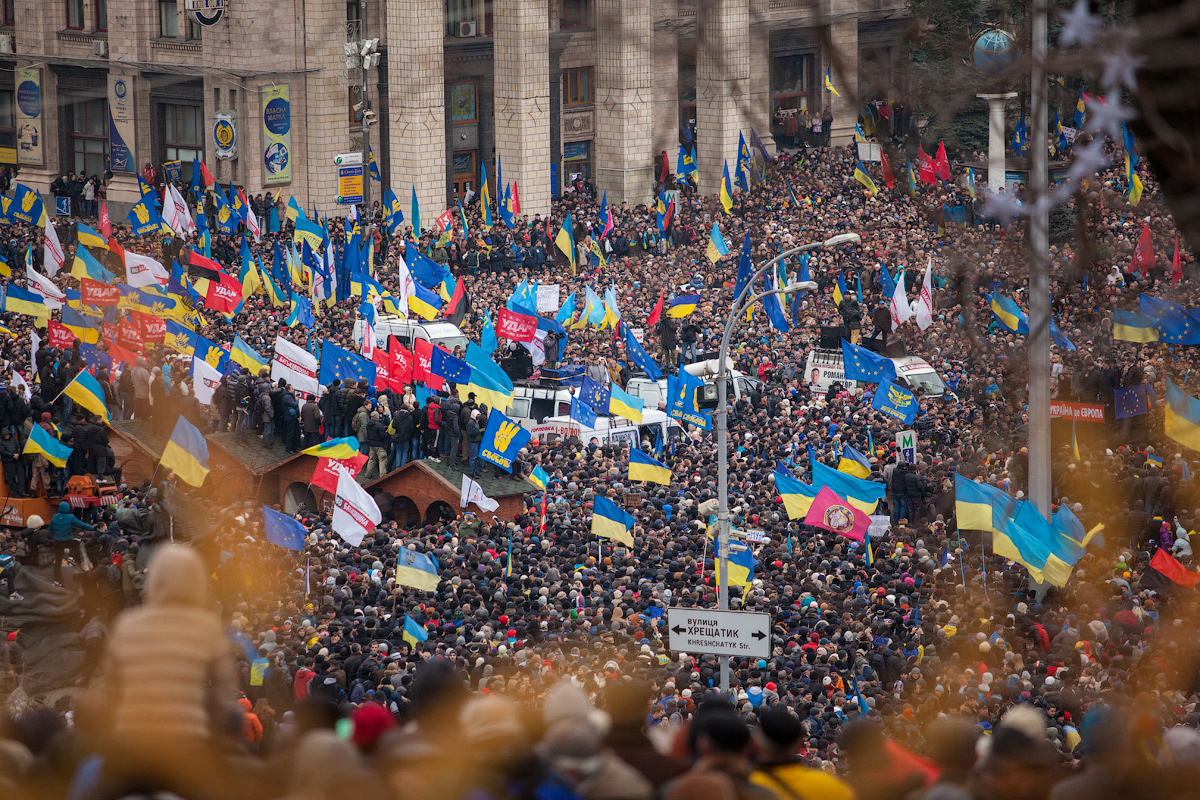
Protesters in Kyiv waving Ukrainian and European flags during the Euromaidan demonstrations in 2013

The flag became a symbol of European integration of Ukraine in the 2010s, particularly after Euromaidan. Ukraine is not a part of the EU but is a member of the Council of Europe. The flag is used by the Cabinet of Ukraine, Prime Minister of Ukraine, and MFA UA during official meetings. It was flown during the 2013 Euromaidan protests in Ukraine, and in 2016 by the pro-EU faction in the EU membership referendum campaigns in the United Kingdom.

The flag has also been adopted as a symbol for EU policies and expansionism by EU-sceptics. In an early instance, Macedonian protesters burned "the flag of the EU" in the context of EU involvement in the 2001 insurgency in the Republic of Macedonia. In the 2005 Islamic protests against the Jyllands-Posten Muhammad cartoons, the Danish flag was most frequently burned, but (as the cartoons were reprinted in many European countries), some protesters opted for burning "the EU flag" instead. Protesters during the Greek government-debt crisis of 2012 "burned the EU flag and shouted 'EU out' ". Burning of the EU flag has been reported from other anti-EU rallies since.

By the 2010s, the association of the emblem with the EU had become so strong that the Council of Europe saw it necessary to design a new logo, to "avoid confusion", officially adopted in 2013.

The EU emblem ("EU flag") is depicted on the euro banknotes. Euro coins also display a circle of twelve stars on both the national and common sides.

It is also depicted on many driving licences and vehicle registration plates issued in the Union. Diplomatic missions of EU member states fly the EU flag alongside their national flag. In October 2000, the then-new British Embassy in Berlin sparked controversy between the UK and Germany and the EU when the embassy did not have a second external flagpole for the EU flag. After diplomatic negotiations, it was agreed that the outside flagpole would have the diplomatic Union Flag while inside the embassy, the EU flag would accompany the UK flag. Some member states' national airlines such as Lufthansa have the EU flag alongside their national flags on aircraft as part of their aircraft registration codes, but this is not an EU-mandated directive.

A number of logos used by EU institutions, bodies and agencies are derived from the design and colours of the EU emblem.

Other emblems make reference to the European flag, such as the EU organic food label that uses the twelve stars but reorders them into the shape of a leaf on a green background. The original logo of the European Broadcasting Union used the twelve stars on a blue background adding ray beams to connect the countries.

There was a proposal before the EU parliament in 2003 to deface national civil ensigns with the EU emblem. The proposal was rejected by the parliament in 2004.

The flag is usually flown by the government of the country holding the rotating presidency Council of Ministers. In 2009, Czech President Václav Klaus, a eurosceptic, refused to fly the flag from his castle. In response, Greenpeace projected an image of the flag onto the castle and attempted to fly the flag from the building themselves.

Extraordinary flying of the flag is common on Europe Day, celebrated annually on 9 May. On Europe Day 2008, the flag was flown for the first time above the German Reichstag.

The flag has also been displayed in the context of EU military operations (EUFOR Althea).

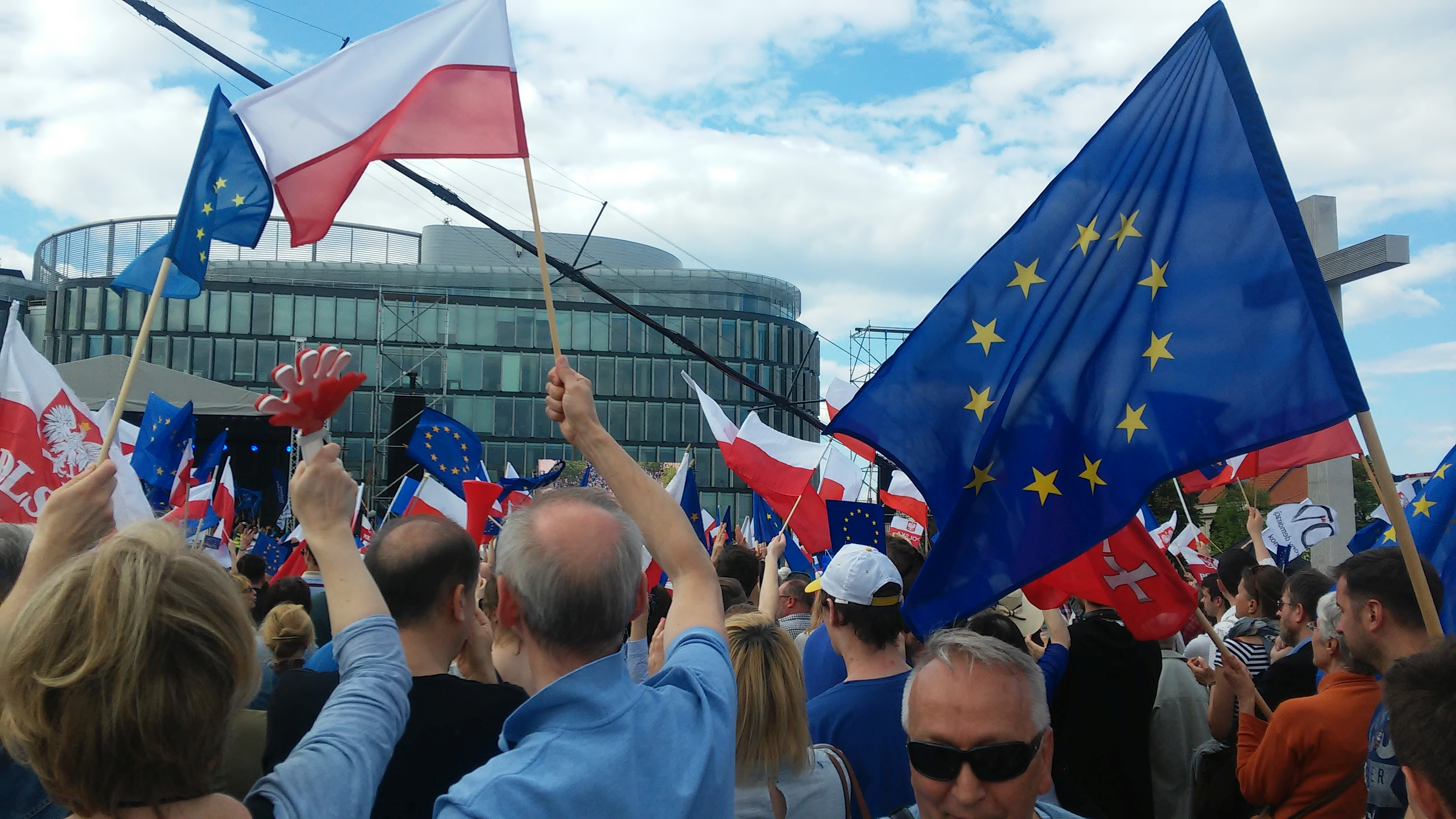
A KOD demonstration in Warsaw, Poland against the ruling Law and Justice party, on 7 May 2016

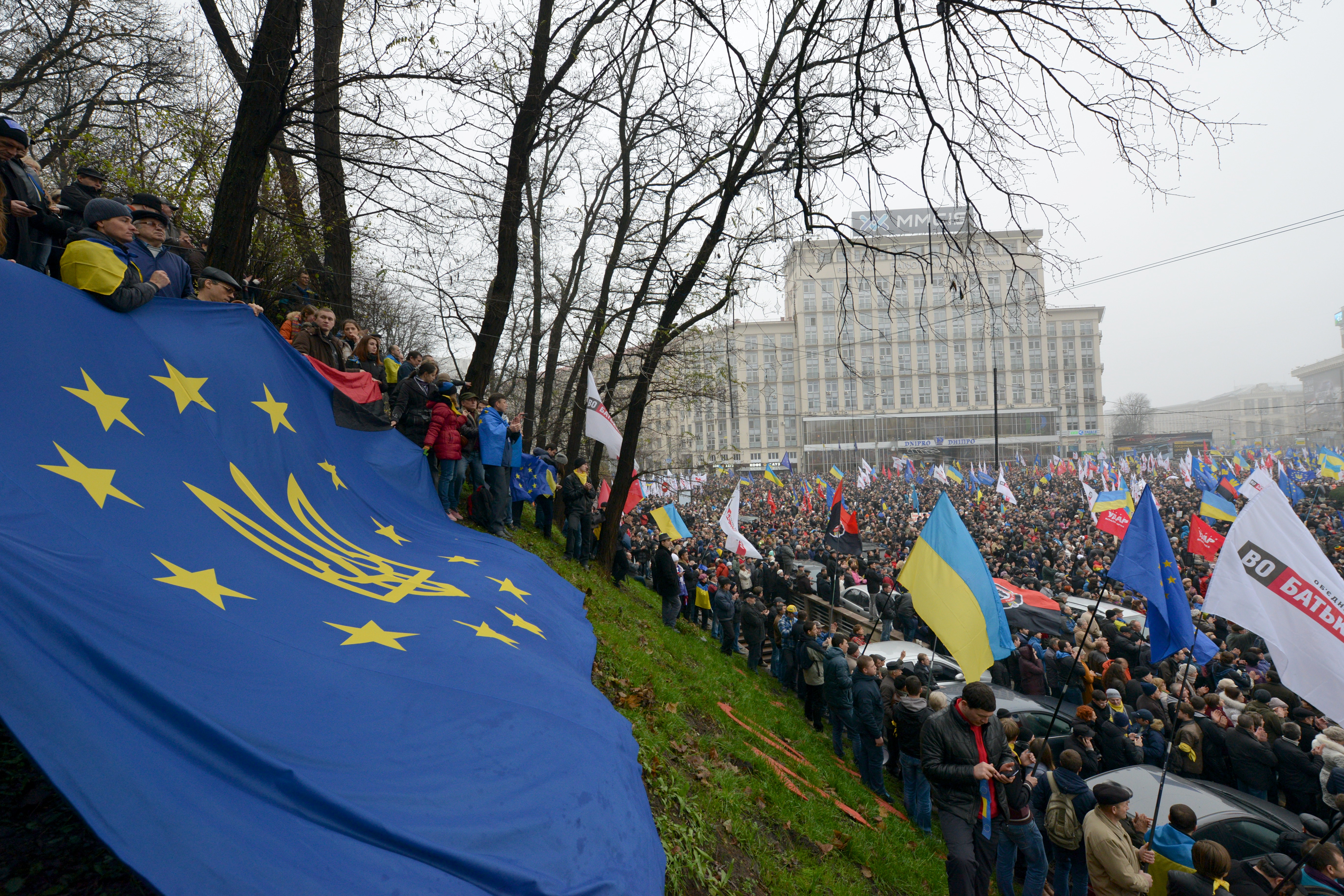
European flag with the Ukrainian trident at a pro-EU rally in Kyiv, Ukraine, on 24 November 2013

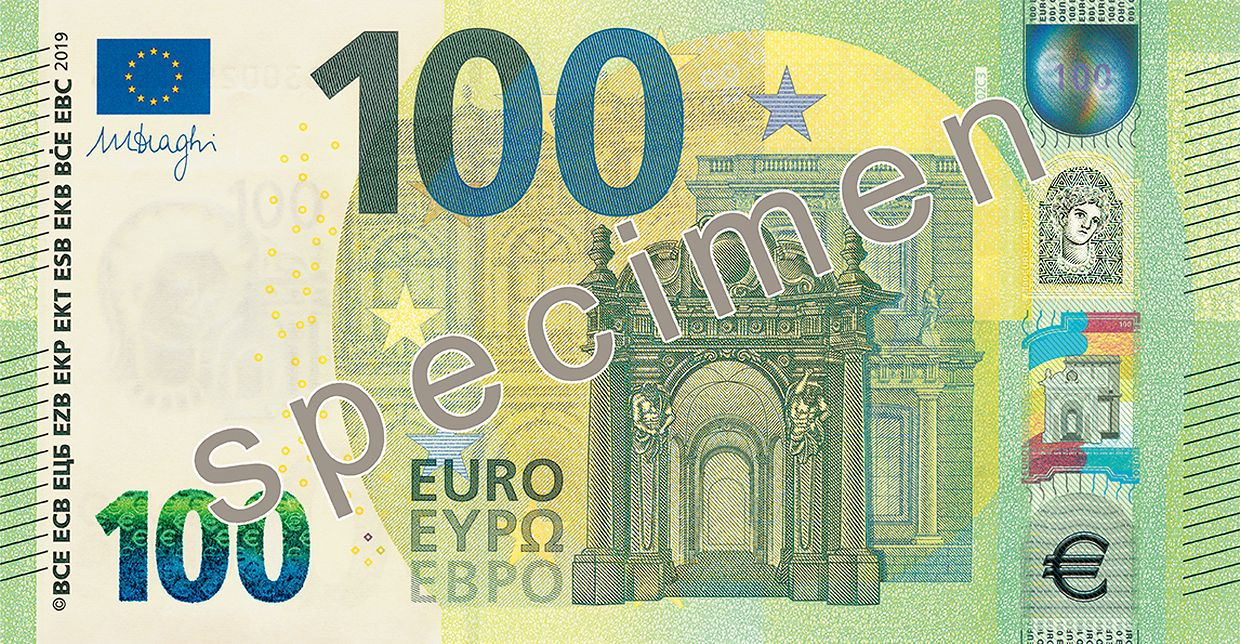
Flag of the EU in the top left corner of a 100 euro banknote (second series)

European Central Bank logo

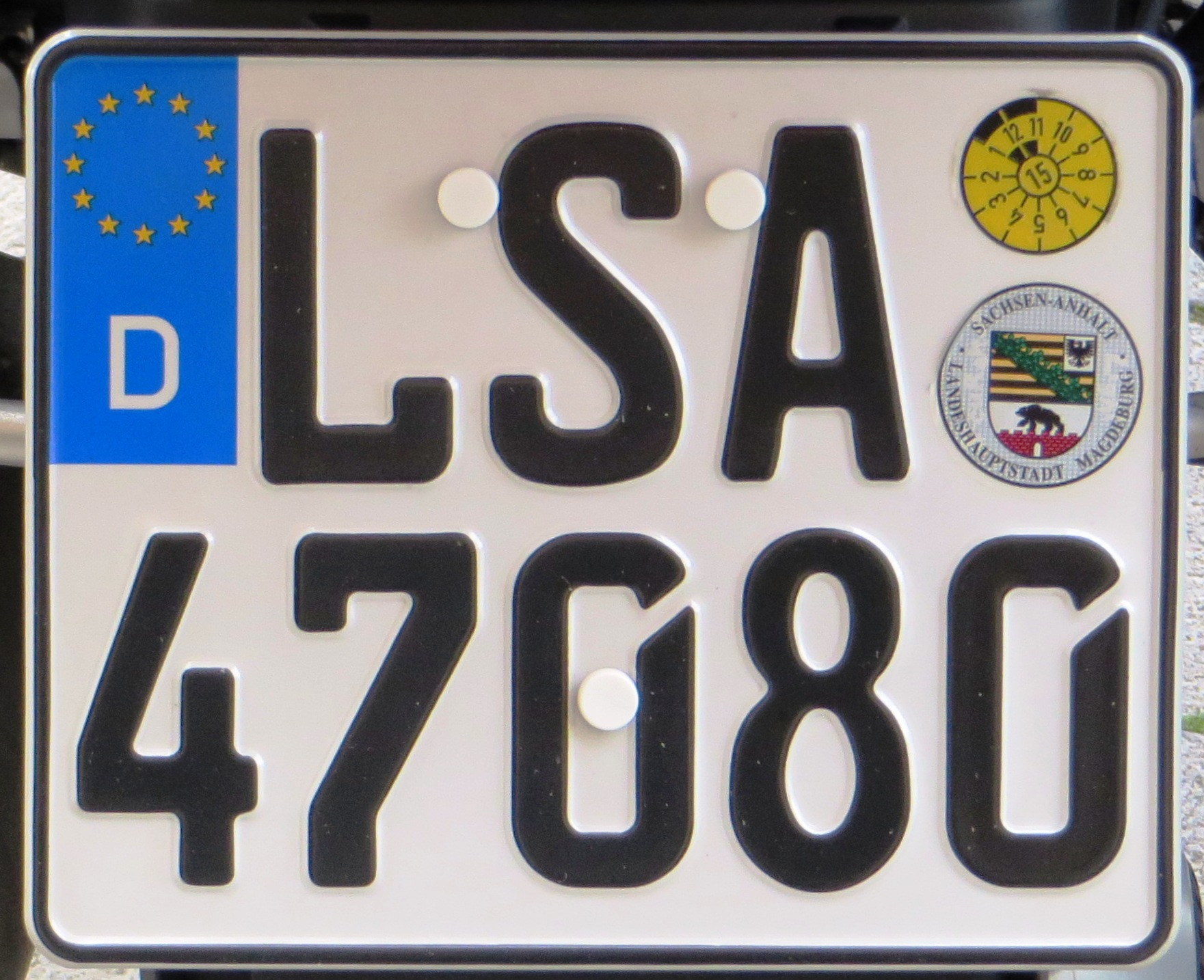
The EU uses the emblem in a number of ways, here on vehicle registration plates. The "D" in this photo indicates Germany (Deutschland).

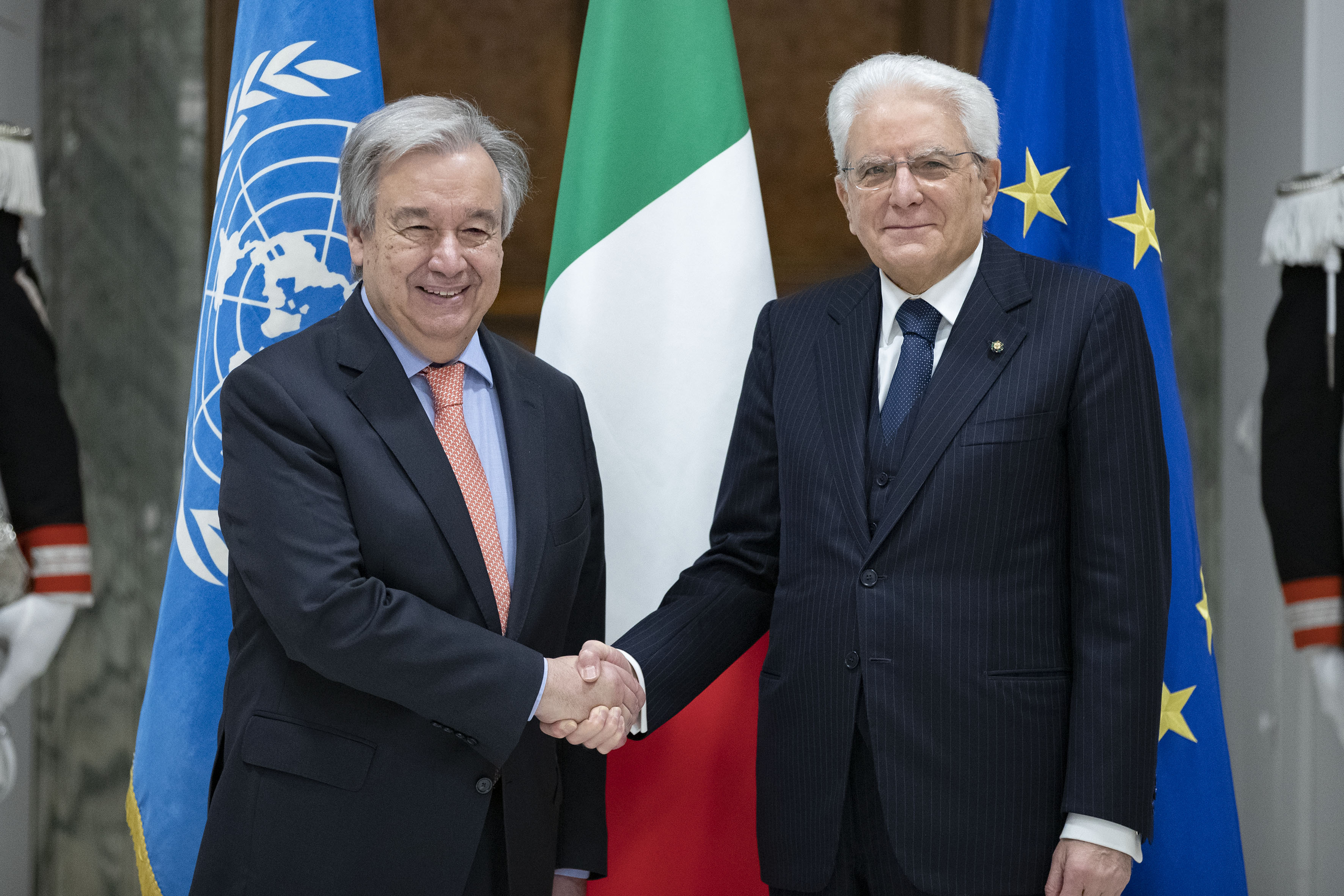
In Italy the European Flag must be displayed alongside the national flag in official ceremonies and over public buildings.

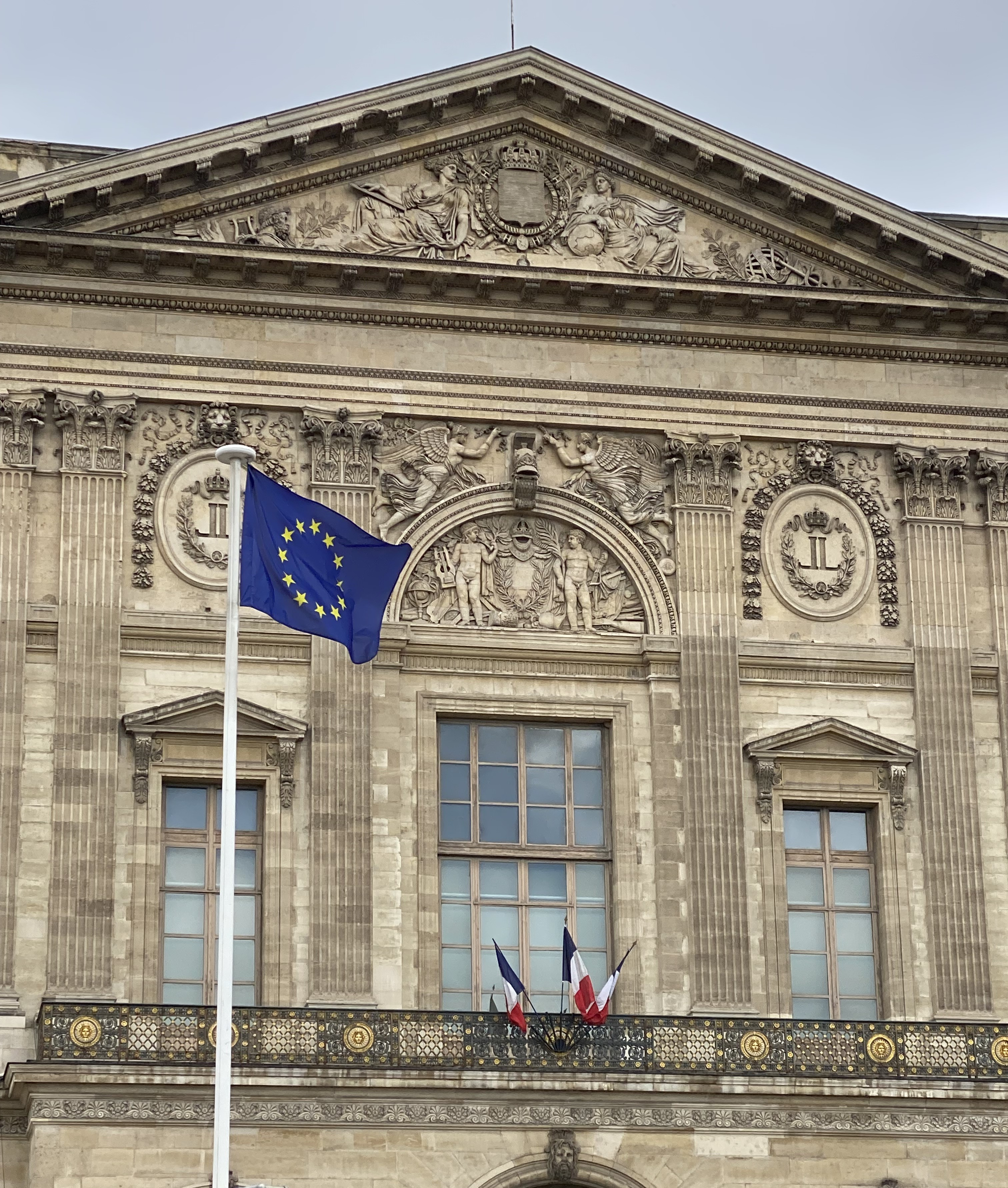
The European Flag is placed on numerous municipal flagpoles in Paris, on a par with the flag of France; here in front of the Louvre Palace (flown upside down).

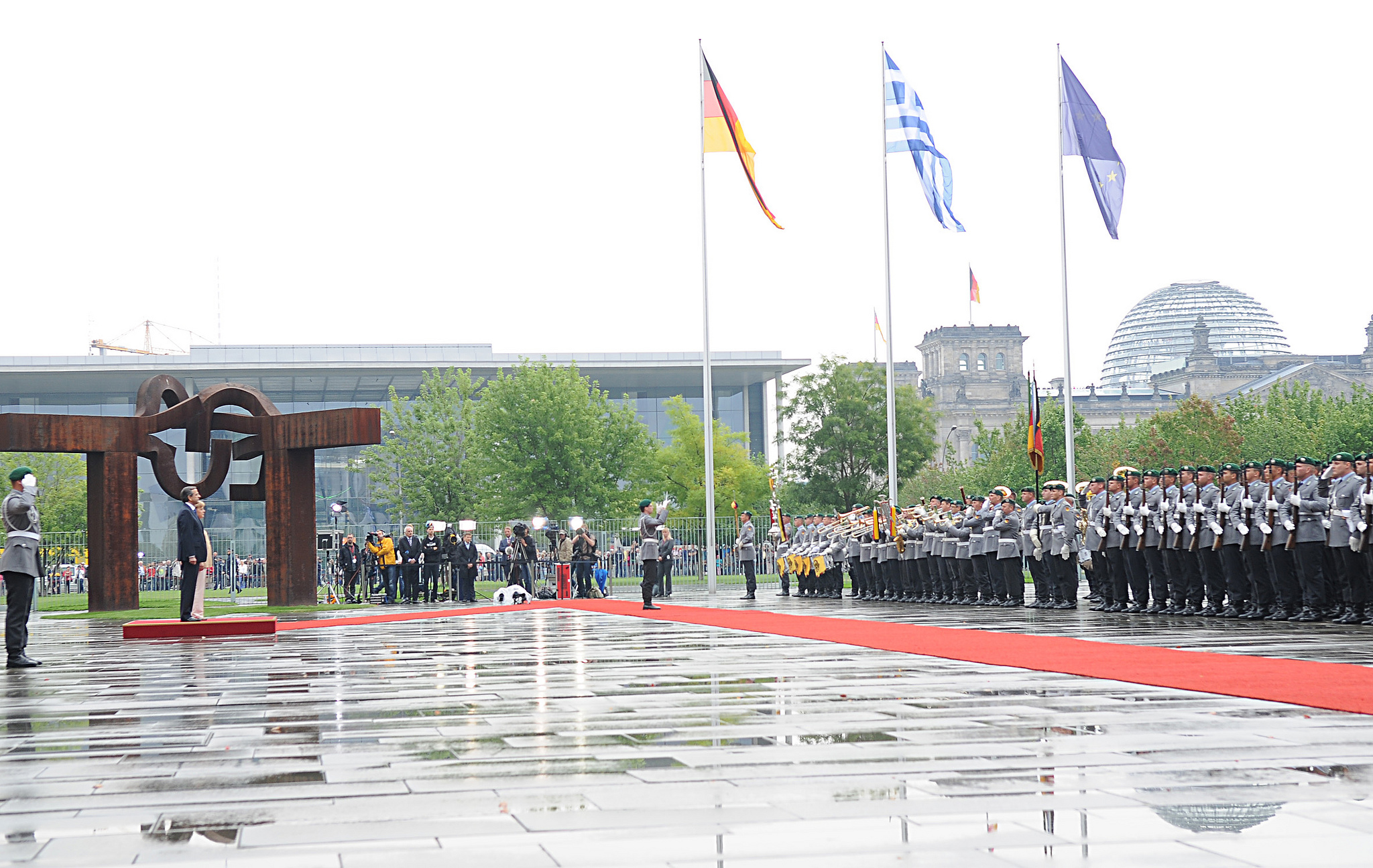
Order of precedence at the state visit of Greek prime minister Antonis Samaras in Berlin (24 August 2012): The Greek flag takes the first order of precedence, followed by the German flag on the right (seen on the left when facing the building) and the European flag in third order, on the left.

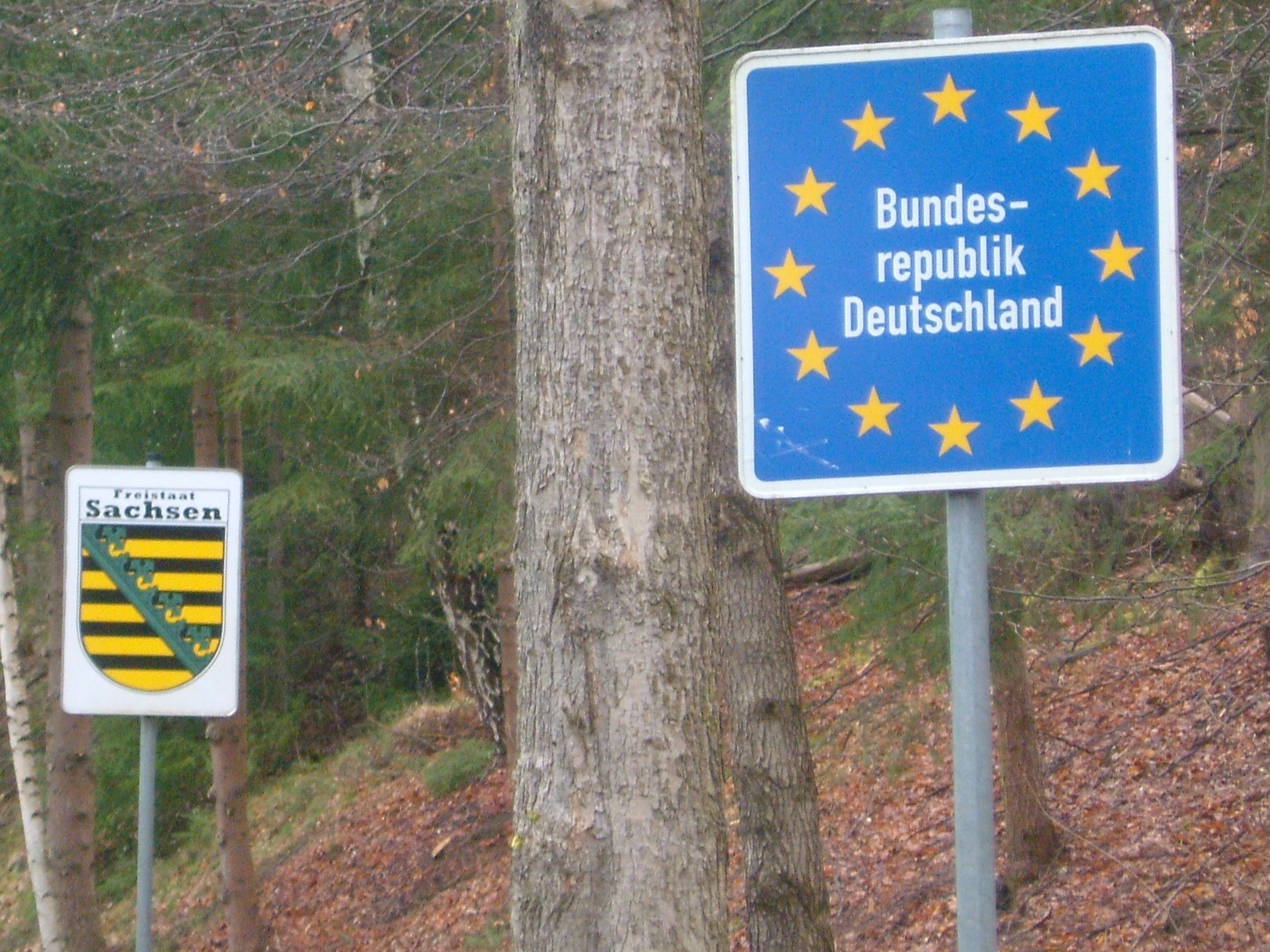
German border sign

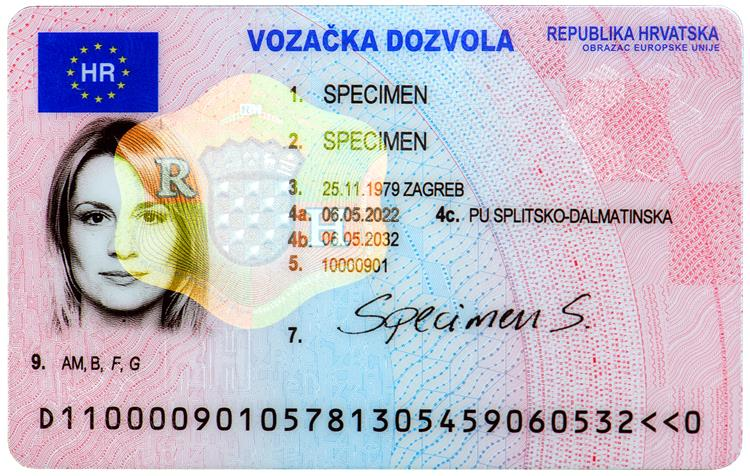
Driving licences in the EU feature the twelve stars on a blue background with the country's distinguishing sign.

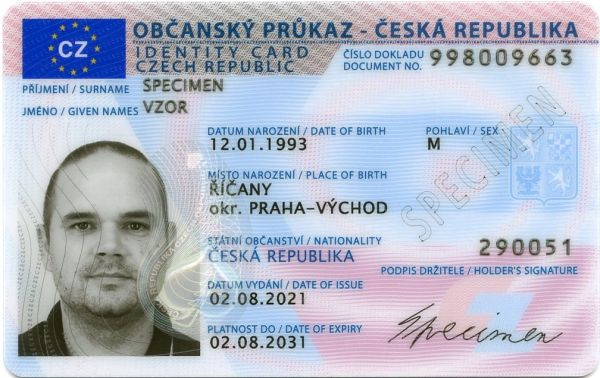
From 2021, identity cards issued in the EU display an EU flag with their two-letter country code.

Sixteen out of twenty-seven member states in 2007 signed the declaration recognising "the flag with a circle of twelve golden stars on a blue background" as representing "the sense of community of the people in the European Union and their allegiance to it." In 2017, president of France Emmanuel Macron signed a declaration endorsing the 2007 statement, so that, as of 2018, 17 out of 27 member states have recognised the emblem as a flag representing "allegiance to the EU": Austria, Belgium, Bulgaria, Cyprus, France, Germany, Greece, Hungary, Italy, Lithuania, Luxembourg, Malta, Portugal, Romania, Slovakia, Slovenia and Spain.

Italy has incorporated the EU flag into its flag code. According to an Italian law passed in 2000, it is mandatory for most public offices and buildings to hoist the European Flag alongside the Italian national flag (Law 22/1998 and Presidential Decree 121/2000). Outside official use, the flag may not be used for "aims incompatible with European values". The 2000 Italian flag code expressly replaces the Italian flag with the European flag in precedence when dignitaries from other EU countries visit – for example the EU flag would be in the middle of a group of three flags rather than the Italian flag. In Germany, the federal flag code of 1996 is only concerned with the German flag, but some of the states have legislated additional provisions for the European flag, such as Bavaria in its flag regulation of 2001, which mandates that the European flag take the third order of precedence, after the federal and state flags, except on Europe Day, where it is to take the first order of precedence.

In Ireland on occasions of "European Union Events" (for example, at a European Council meeting), where the European flag is flown alongside all national flags of member states, the national flags are placed in alphabetical order (according to their name in the main language of that state) with the European flag either at the head, or the far-right, of the order of flags.

In most member states, use of the EU flag is only de facto and not regulated by legislation, and as such subject to ad hoc revision. In national usage, national protocol usually demands the national flag takes precedence over the European flag (which is usually displayed to the right of the national flag from the observer's perspective). In November 2014, the speaker of the Hungarian Parliament László Kövér ordered the removal of the EU flag from the parliament building, following an incident in which a member of parliament had "defenestrated" two EU flags from a fourth story window. In November 2015, the newly elected Polish government under Beata Szydło removed the EU flag from government press conferences.

== Derivative designs ==
The design of the European flag has been used in a variation, such as that of the Council of Europe mentioned above, and also to a greater extent such as the flag of the Western European Union (WEU; now defunct), which uses the same colours and the stars but has a number of stars based on membership and in a semicircle rather than a circle. It is also defaced with the initials of the former Western European Union in two languages.

The European Parliament used its own flag from 1973, but never formally adopted it. It fell out of use with the adoption of the twelve-star flag by the Parliament in 1983. The flag followed the yellow and blue colour scheme however instead of twelve stars there were the letters EP and PE (initials of the European Parliament in the six community languages at the time) surrounded by a wreath. Sometime later, the Parliament chose to use a logo consisting of a stylised hemicycle and the EU flag at the bottom right.

The flag of Bosnia and Herzegovina, imposed by High Representative Carlos Westendorp after the country's parliament failed to agree on a design, is reminiscent of the symbolism of the EU flag, using the same blue and yellow colours; also, the stars (although of a different number and colour) are a direct reference to those of the European flag.

Likewise, Kosovo uses blue, yellow and stars in its flag, which has been mocked as a "none too subtle nod to the flag of the European Union, which is about to become Kosovo's new best friend as it takes over protector status from the United Nations".

The flag of the Brussels-Capital Region (introduced in 2016) consists of a yellow iris with a white outline upon a blue background. Its colours are based on the colours of the Flag of Europe, because Brussels is considered the unofficial capital of the EU.

The blue and yellow colours of the Brussels flag are those of the European Union, of which Brussels is the de facto capital city.

The flag of Bosnia and Herzegovina was partly based on the European flag.

Logo of the Council of Europe

Flag of the European Coal and Steel Community (1958–1972)

Flag of the European Coal and Steel Community (1973–1980)

Flag of the European Coal and Steel Community (1981–1985)

Flag of the European Coal and Steel Community (1986–2002)

The flag of Kosovo was partly based on the European flag.

Flag of the Western European Union (1993–1995)

Flag of the Western European Union (1995–2011)

Flag of the Assembly of the Western European Union

Flag of the European Parliament (1973–1983)

Flag of the European Maritime Safety Agency

Flag of the European Monitoring Centre for Drugs and Drug Addiction (until 2024)

EU emblem for certification of organic agricultural products

=== Heraldry ===
The coat of arms of the chairman of the European Union Military Committee (CEUMC), the highest-ranking officer within the EU's Common Security and Defence Policy (CSDP), depicts the European emblem as a coat of arms, i.e. emblazoned on an escutcheon. In heraldic terms, this makes the European flag is the banner of arms, i.e. the flag form of this coat of arms. In English blazon, the arms is Azure, a circle of 12 mullets or, their points not touching.

Several EU publications related to the CSDP generally, and its prospective development as a defence arm, have also displayed the European emblem in this manner, albeit as a graphical design element rather than an official symbol.

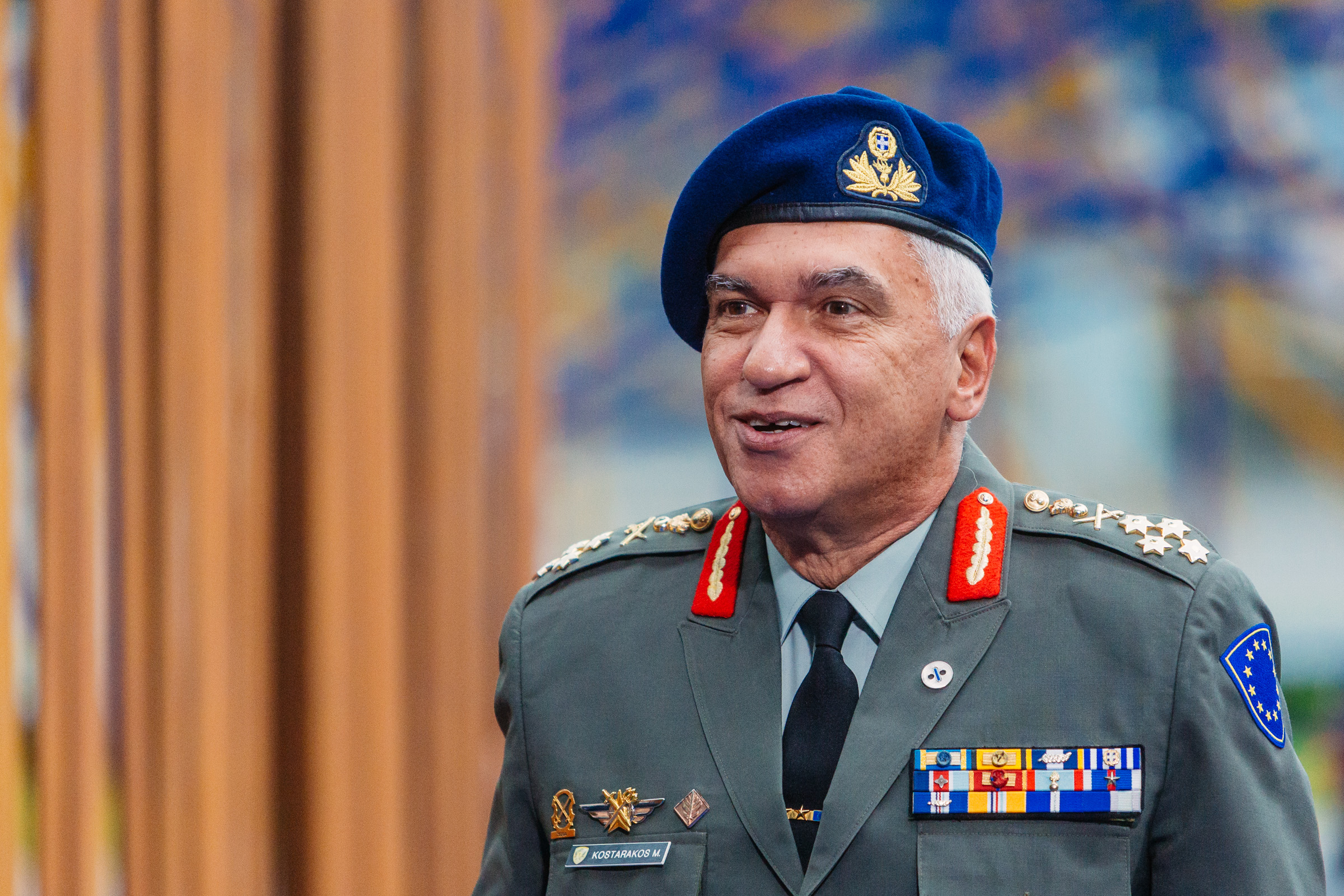
Chairman Michail Kostarakos wearing the heraldic badge

Heraldic badge

Moldovan and Ukrainian flags displayed as supporters, symbolising the EU's border assistance mission since 2005

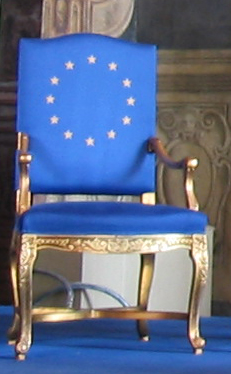
The European emblem emblazoned on a chair at the occasion of the 2004 signing of the European Constitution in Rome

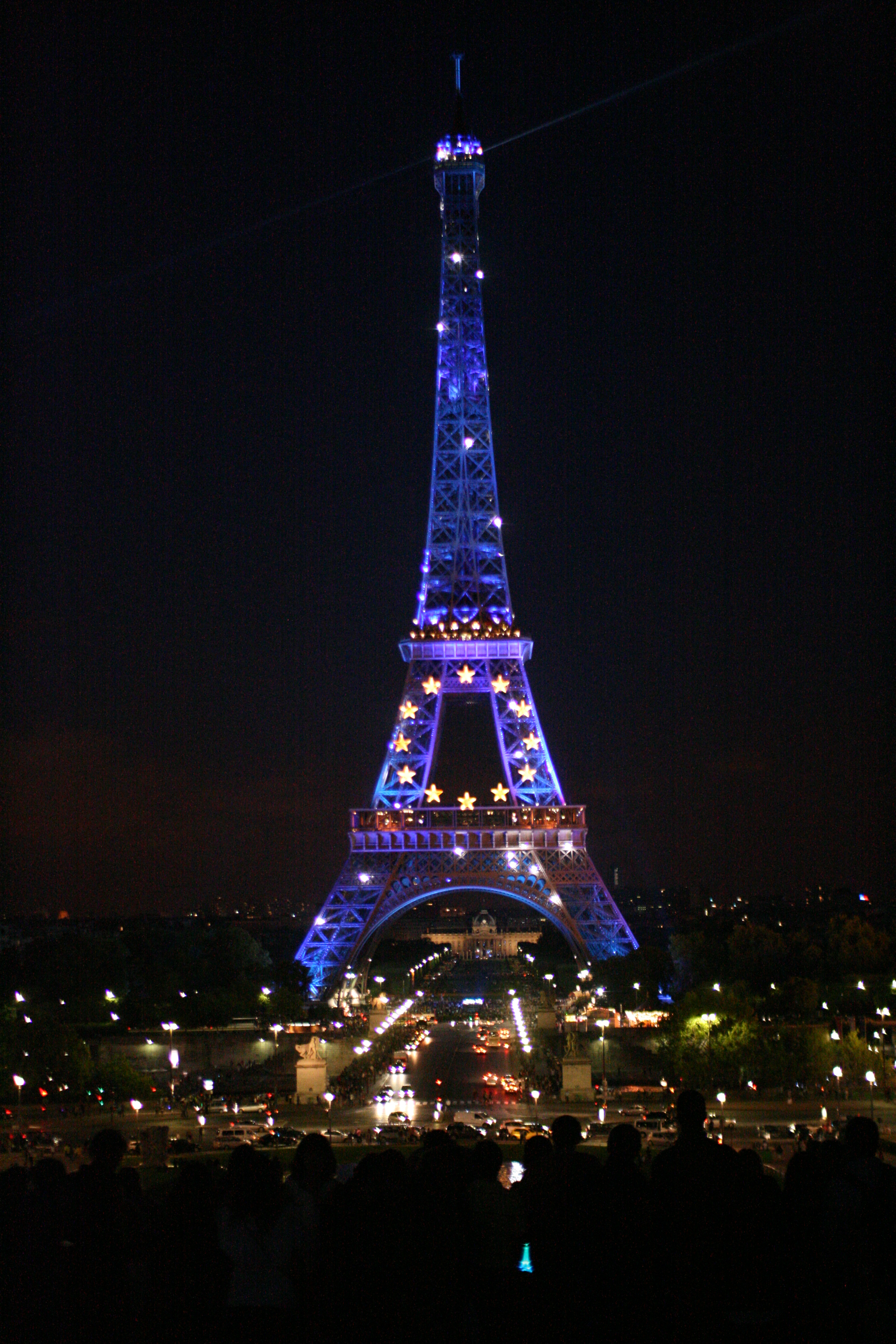
The European emblem emblazoned on the Eiffel Tower in 2008

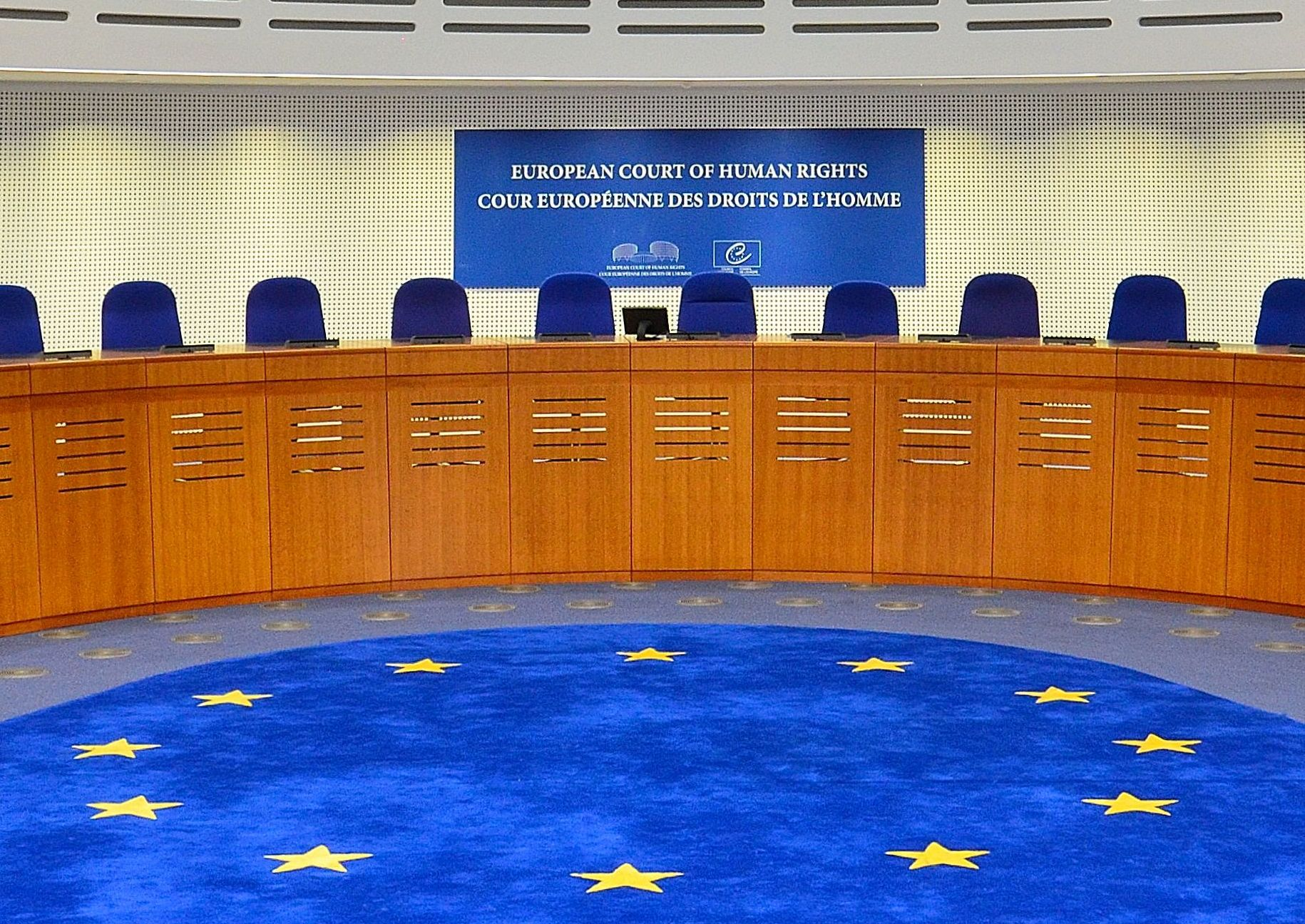
The European emblem emblazoned on the carpet in the European Court of Human Rights

== See also ==
- Symbols of Europe#Flag
- Symbols of the European Union
- European Fisheries Control Agency#Pennant

Flags of the European Union's precursors

- Flag of the Western Union
- Flag of the Western European Union
- Flag of the European Coal and Steel Community

Flags of other European unification movements

- Flag of the Paneuropean Union (adopted 1922)
- Hertensteiner Cross of the federalist movements (used in 1946)
- Federalist flag of the European Movement (adopted 1948)

Other continental flags

- Flag of the African Union
- Flag of the Eurasian Economic Union
