= Anthems of international organizations =

This article contains a list of anthems of international organizations.

== Political, cultural and military organizations ==
Organization	Anthem	Adopted	Lyricist(s)	Composer(s)	Audio
African Union	Let Us All Unite and Celebrate Together	1986	Tsegaye Gabre-Medhin	Arthur Mudogo Kemoli	
Association of South East Asian Nations	The ASEAN Way	2008	Payom Valaiphatchra	Kittikhun Sodprasert; Sampow Tri-udom	
Caribbean Community	Celebrating Caricom	2013	Michele Henderson	Michele Henderson	
Council of Europe	Anthem of Europe	1972	Friedrich Schiller	Ludwig van Beethoven	
European Union	Anthem of Europe	1985	Friedrich Schiller	Ludwig van Beethoven	
East African Community	Wimbo wa Jumuiya Afrika Mashariki	2010		John Mugango	
North Atlantic Treaty Organization	The NATO Hymn	2018	N/A	André Reichling	
Organisation internationale de la Francophonie	Ode à la joie		N/A	Ludwig van Beethoven	

== Sporting organizations ==
=== Sports federations ===
Organization	Anthem	Adopted	Lyricist(s)	Composer(s)	Audio
Asian Football Confederation	AFC Anthem	2015	N/A	Lee Dong-june	
Fédération internationale de football association	FIFA Anthem	1994	N/A	Franz Lambert	
International Olympic Committee	Olympic Hymn	1958	Kostis Palamas	Spyridon Samaras	
International Paralympic Committee	Anthem of the Future	1994	Graeme Connors	Thierry Darnis	
Jeux de la Francophonie	La lumière qui nous unit	1989	Jang Linster	Jang Linster	
Olympic Council of Asia	OCA Hymn	1986	N/A		
UEFA	Zadok the Priest	1954	Based on 1 Kings 1:34-45	George Frideric Handel	

=== Sports events ===
Organization	Anthem	Adopted	Lyricist(s)	Composer(s)	Audio
Rugby World Cup	World in Union	1991	Charlie Skarbek	Gustav Holst	
UEFA Champions League	UEFA Champions League Anthem	1992	Tony Britten	George Frideric Handel	
UEFA Europa League	UEFA Europa League Anthem	2012	n/a	Yohann Zveig	

== Proposed and unofficial anthems ==
Organization	Anthem	Date	Lyricist(s)	Composer(s)	Audio
Commonwealth of Nations	The Commonwealth Anthem	2016	Taken from the Universal Declaration on Human Rights	Paul Carroll	
United Nations	Hymn to the United Nations	1971	W. H. Auden	Pablo Casals	

== Anthems of former organizations ==
Organization	Anthem	Date	Lyricist(s)	Composer(s)	Audio
Communist International	Kominternlied	1929	Hans Eisler	Franz Jahnke and Max Vallentin	
Warsaw Pact	Song of the United Armies	1958	Lev Oshanin	Boris Aleksandrov	

== See also ==
- Earth anthem
- Flags of international organizations
