= African and Malagasy Union =

Organization

- French: Union Africaine et Malgache
- Flag

- Founding members (Brazzaville Group) Members that joined 1965 Member that joined 1970
- Formation: 12 September 1961
- Dissolved: 23 March 1985
- Type: Intergovernmental organization
- Legal status: defunct
- Purpose: Various; originally cooperation
- Headquarters: Brazzaville, Republic of the Congo
- Official language: French
- Main organ: Various

The African and Malagasy Union (AMU) (French: Union Africaine et Malgache (UAM)) was an intergovernmental organization created to promote cooperation among newly independent states in Francophone Africa. The organization derives its name from the name of the continent of Africa and from the former Malagasy Republic, now Madagascar. Created in 1961, the scope and form of the organization changed significantly from 1963-1966, and ultimately disbanded in 1985.

== Background ==
At a meeting held in Brazzaville in December 1960, twelve French-Speaking States agreed to maintain close relationships but also a special relationship with the former colonial power, France. This group became known as the Brazzaville Group, comprising the countries of Chad, Cameroon, Congo-Brazzaville, Dahomey, Gabon, Upper Volta, Mauritania, Niger, the Malagasy Republic, the Central African Republic, Senegal and Côte d'Ivoire.

In response to the meeting, seven African states led by left-wing leaders met in 1961 as the Casablanca Group, united by a belief in the need for African political unification or federation. That same year, the Brazzaville Group expanded to include non-francophone countries as the Monrovia Group, expressing opposition to federation, instead stressing the importance of Africa's newly independent states retaining their autonomy and strengthening their own bureaucracies, militaries and economies. The Monrovia Group's ideas ultimately prevailed. In 1963, states from both groups joined to create the Organisation of African Unity (OAU), requiring regional political blocs to disband.

== History ==
The UAM was founded on 12 September 1961 in Antananarivo by members of the Brazzaville Group. The original aims were both economic and political: to adopt common stands on international issues, to promote economic and culture cooperation, and to maintain a common defense organization. However, this caused a problem: the organization would have to depend on France. The diversity, geography, and post-colonial problems of the different countries kept the organization from ever becoming significant.

Before 1963, the Union functioned through three independently established specialized organizations (the African and Malagasy Organization of Economic Co-operation, the African and Malagasy Postal and Telecommunications Union, the African and Malagasy Defense Union) and the UAM Group at the United Nations. After the creation of the Organisation of African Unity in 1963, regional african blocs were required to disband. At their conference in Dakar on March 7-10 1964, the UAM effectively disbanded as a political organisation, reorganizing and grouping all the specialized bodies into a single secretariat as the Afro-Malagasy Union for Economic Cooperation (French: Union Africaine et Malgache de Coopération Économique (UAMCE)). Moktar Ould Daddah was elected as the president of the organisation while the city of Yaoundé was selected as the headquarters seat. At a meeting in Nouakchott in February 1965, it was decided to again transform the Organisation. A charter was signed on 27 June 1966 at a meeting in Antananarivo, going into force on 28 December 1967, creating the African and Malagasy Common Organization (French: Organization Commune Africaine et Malgache (OCAM)).

From 1966 onwards, the aims of the organization were economic, social, technical, and cultural cooperation. OCAM dropped the political and defense objectives that its predecessor, the UAM, had attempted to embrace. It created the structures of an international organization: a Conference of Heads of State and Government, a Council of Ministers, a Secretariat and Secretary-General, and established its headquarters at Bangui in the Central African Republic. It developed a number of joint services and of these the most successful and most well known is the multinational airline Air Afrique. In 1979 the airline was separated from OCAM.

Membership of the Organisation fluctuaded. At the decision to create OCAM in February 1965, Togo was included alongside the 12 original members of the UAM. In May 1965 its membership was increased by the admission of the former Belgian territories of Congo (Kinshasa) and Rwanda. In June 1965, however, Mauritania withdrew, and the new OCAM charter was signed by the remaining 14 countries. The organization's later history became increasingly troubled. Mauritius joined in 1970. Congo (Kinshasa), by then renamed Zaire, withdrew in 1972; Congo (Brazzaville) in 1973; Cameroon, Chad and Madagascar in 1974; Gabon in 1977. However, some of these countries retained their links with OCAM's various agencies. In 1982 OCAM held a summit at Abidjan, Côte d'Ivoire; it had then changed its name, though only to substitute Mauritius for Madagascar, to Organization Commune Africaine et Mauricienne. OCAM, also, has ceased to operate. The organization officially disbanded in 1985.

== Member states ==
Founding members:

- Chad (withdrew 1974)
- Cameroon (withdrew 1974)
- Republic of the Congo (withdrew 1973)
- Dahomey (later Benin)
- Gabon (withdrew 1977)
- Upper Volta (later Burkina Faso)
- Mauritania (withdrew 1965)
- Niger
- Malagasy Republic (later Madagascar) (withdrew 1974)
- Central African Republic
- Senegal
- Côte d'Ivoire

Joined February 1965:

- Togo

Joined May 1965:

- Republic of the Congo (later Zaire) (withdrew 1972)
- Rwanda

Joined 1970:

- Mauritius

== See also ==
- Students Movement of the African and Malagasy Common Organization
