= Africa Day =

Commemoration of the founding of the African Union

- Observed by: Africans
- Type: International; cultural and historical
- Significance: Anniversary of the foundation of the Organisation of African Unity
- Date: 25 May
- Next time: 25 May 2027
- Frequency: annual
- Related to: African Freedom Day and African Liberation Day

Africa Day (formerly African Freedom Day and African Liberation Day) is the annual commemoration of the foundation of the Organisation of African Unity on 25 May 1963. It is celebrated in various countries in Africa as well as around the world. The organisation was replaced by the African Union on 9 July 2002, but the holiday continues to be celebrated on 25 May.

== Background ==
The First Congress of Independent African States was held in Accra, Ghana on 15 April 1958. It was convened by the Prime Minister of Ghana, Dr. Kwame Nkrumah, and comprised representatives from Egypt (then a constituent part of the United Arab Republic), Ethiopia, Liberia, Libya, Morocco, Sudan, Tunisia, the Union of the Peoples of Cameroon, and the host country, Ghana. The Union of South Africa was not invited. The conference showcased progress of liberation movements on the African continent in addition to symbolizing the determination of the people of Africa to free themselves from foreign domination and exploitation. Although the Pan-African Congress had been working towards similar goals since its foundation in 1900, this was the first time such a meeting had taken place on African soil.

The conference called for the founding of an African Freedom Day, a day to "...mark each year the onward progress of the liberation movement, and to symbolize the determination of the people of Africa to free themselves from foreign domination and exploitation."

The conference was notable in that it laid the basis for the subsequent meetings of African heads of state and government during the Casablanca Group and the Monrovia Group era, until the formation of the Organisation of African Unity (OAU) in 1963.

== History ==
Five years later, on 25 May 1963, representatives of thirty African nations met in Addis Ababa, Ethiopia, hosted by Emperor Haile Selassie. By then more than two-thirds of the continent had achieved independence, mostly from imperial European states. At this meeting, the Organization of African Unity was founded, with the initial aim to encourage the decolonization of Angola, Mozambique, South Africa and Southern Rhodesia. The organization pledged to support the work conducted by freedom fighters, and remove military access to colonial nations. A charter was set out which sought to improve the living standards across member states. Selassie exclaimed, "May this convention of union last 1,000 years."

The charter was signed by all attendees on 26 May, with the exception of Morocco. (Note: Morocco's delegation was present in an observatory capacity only, due to the attendance of Mauritania and the ongoing border dispute with that nation.) At that meeting, Africa Freedom Day was renamed Africa Liberation Day. In 2002, the OAU was replaced by the African Union. However, the renamed celebration of Africa Day continues to be celebrated on 25 May in respect to the formation of the OAU.

== Contemporary celebrations ==
Africa Day continues to be celebrated both in Africa and around the world, mostly on 25 May (although in some cases these periods of celebrations can be stretched out over a period of days or weeks). Themes are set for each year's Africa Day, with 2015's being the "Year of Women's Empowerment and Development towards Africa's Agenda 2063". At an event in New York City in 2015, Deputy Secretary-General of the United Nations, Jan Eliasson, delivered a message from Secretary-General Ban Ki-moon in which he said, "Let us... intensify our efforts to provide Africa's women with better access to education, work and health care and, by doing so, accelerate Africa's transformation". The slogan of the 2023 Africa Day celebration was "Our Africa Our Future". The theme of 2024 Africa Day celebration was "Education Fit for the 21st Century". In 2025 the theme for that year's Africa Day was "Justice for Africans and People of African Descent through Reparations”. The slogan for Africa Day 2026 was "Assuring Sustainable Water Availability and Safe Sanitation Systems".

== Sixth region and diaspora observances ==
=== Africa–Caribbean (CARICOM) Day ===
In 2021 the Republic of Kenya hosted the first joint African Union summit along with the Caribbean Community (CARICOM) region virtually. To commemorate this event it was decided that September 7, would be celebrated annually as Africa-CARICOM Day throughout the Caribbean to recognize and strengthen linkages between CARICOM and Africa. The first of August has been celebrated as African Emancipation Day throughout much of the British Empire from the Trans-Atlantic African Slave Trade and the addition of Africa Day in the Caribbean has come to be regarded as part of an observance known as the 'Season of Emancipation' across the Caribbean countries.

== See also ==
- .africa
- African diaspora
- List of ethnic groups of Africa
- African independence movements
- Decolonisation of Africa
- Pan-Africanism
- International Day of the African Child
