= Flags of international organizations =

This article contains a list of flags of international organizations.

== Political, cultural and military organizations ==
=== Global ===
Flag of the Commonwealth of Nations

Flag of the Community of Portuguese Language Countries

Flag of the International Criminal Court

Flag of the Organisation internationale de la Francophonie

Flag of the Organisation of Islamic Cooperation

Flag of the Permanent Court of Arbitration

Flag of the United Nations

Flag of UNESCO

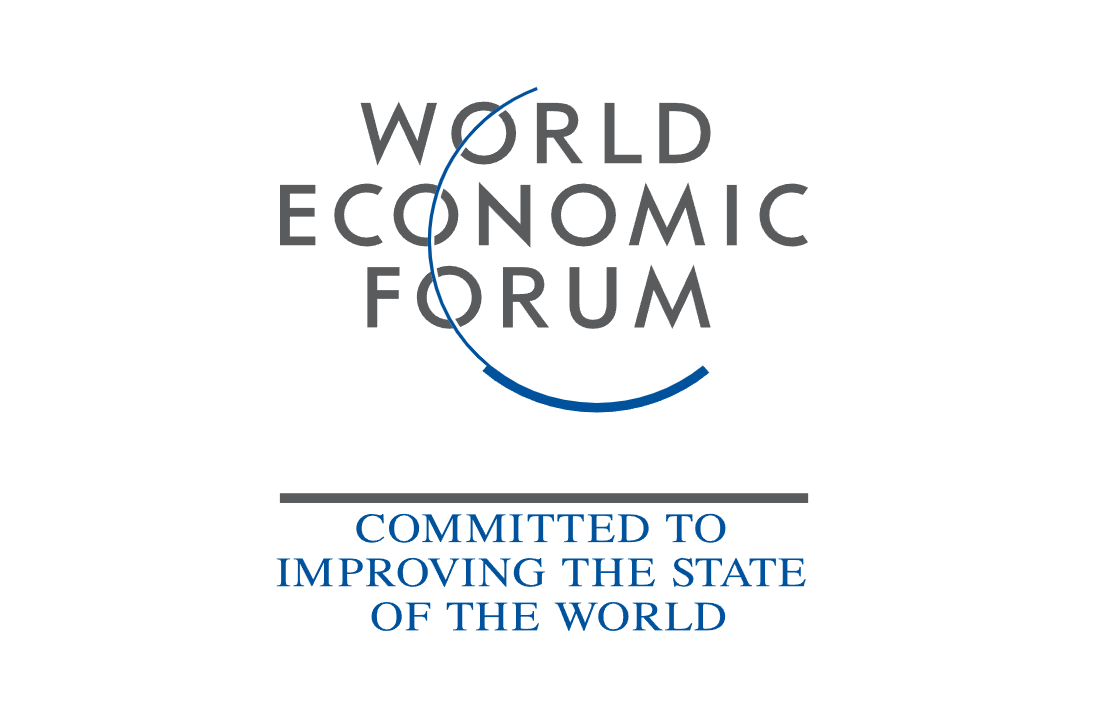
Flag of the World Economic Forum

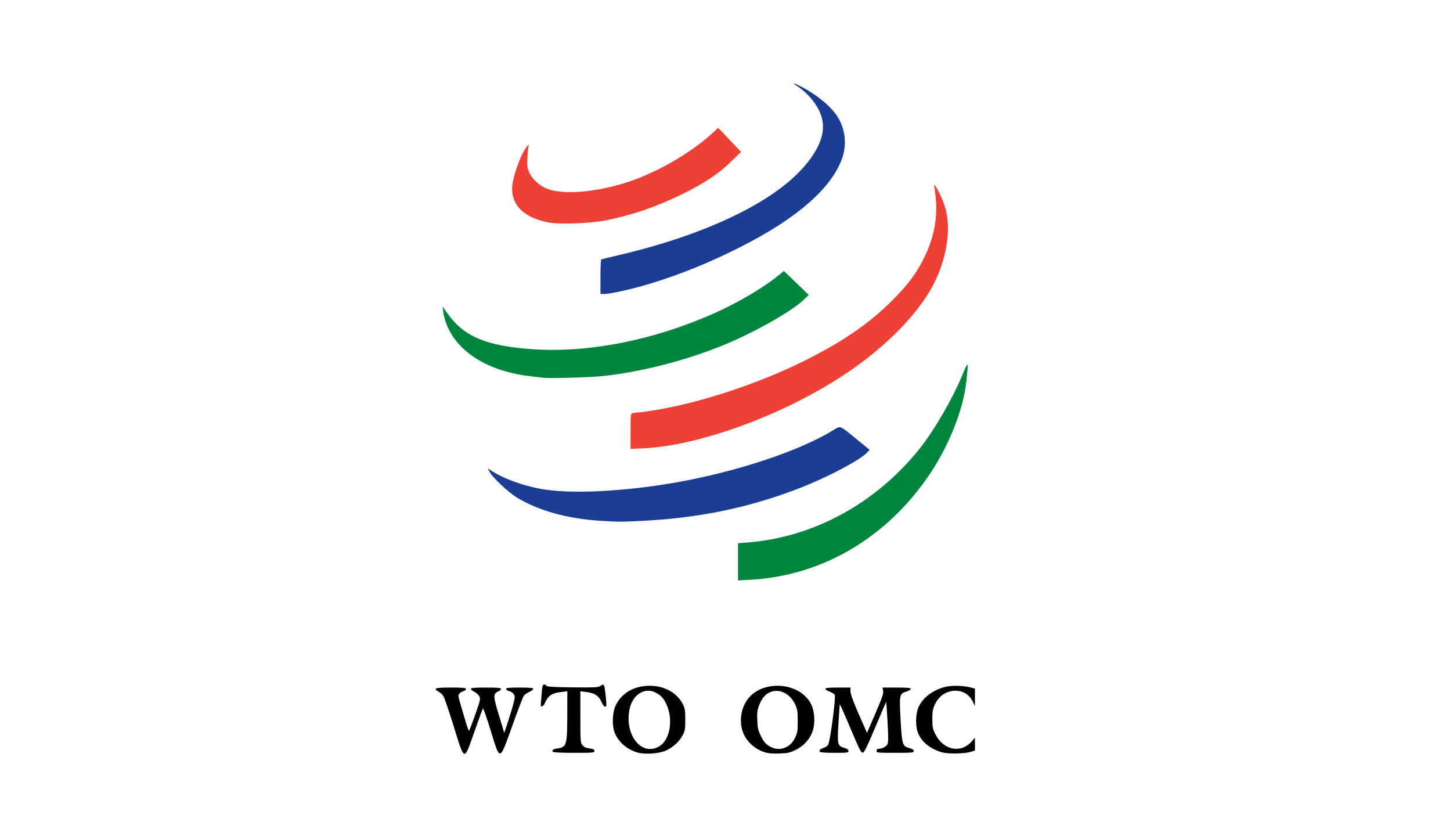
Flag of the World Trade Organization

=== Transcontinental ===
Flag of the Organisation of African, Caribbean and Pacific States

Flag of the Arab League

Flag of the Collective Security Treaty Organization

Flag of the Commonwealth of Independent States

Flag of the Eurasian Economic Union

Flag of the North Atlantic Treaty Organization (NATO)

Flag of the Organization for Security and Co-operation in Europe

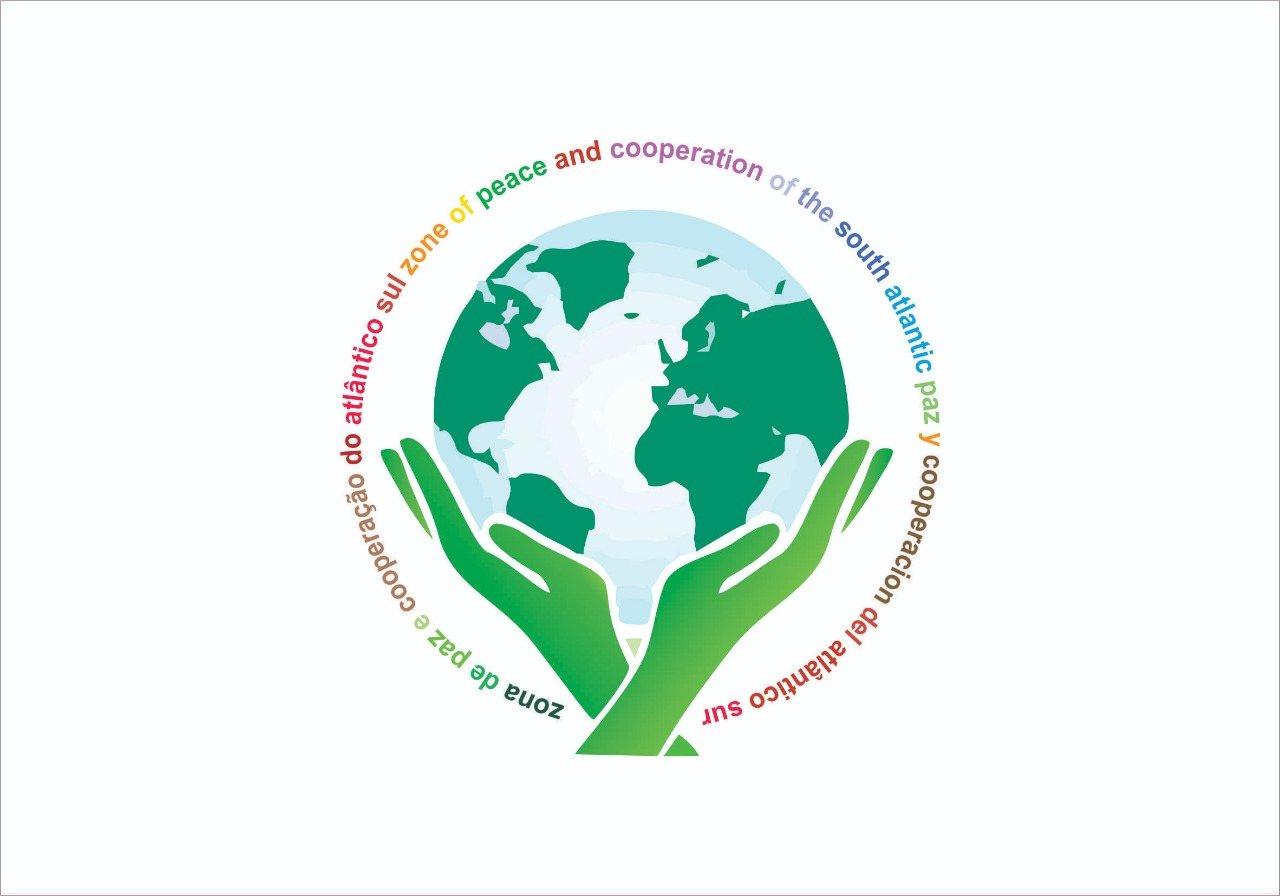
Flag of the South Atlantic Peace and Cooperation Zone

Flag of the Union for the Mediterranean

=== Africa ===
Flag of the African Union

Flag of the East African Community

Flag of the Economic Community of West African States (ECOWAS)

Flag of the Southern African Development Community (SADC)

=== Americas ===
Flag of the Andean Community

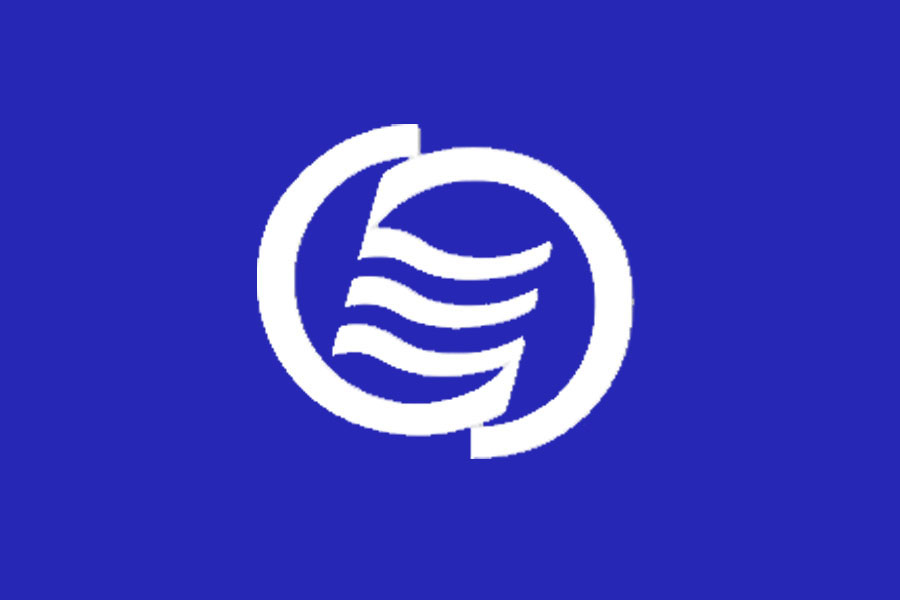
Flag of the Association of Caribbean States

Flag of the Central American Integration System

Flag of the Caribbean Community

Flag of the Community of Latin American and Caribbean States

Flag of the Latin American Parliament

Flag of Mercosur

Flag of the Organization of American States

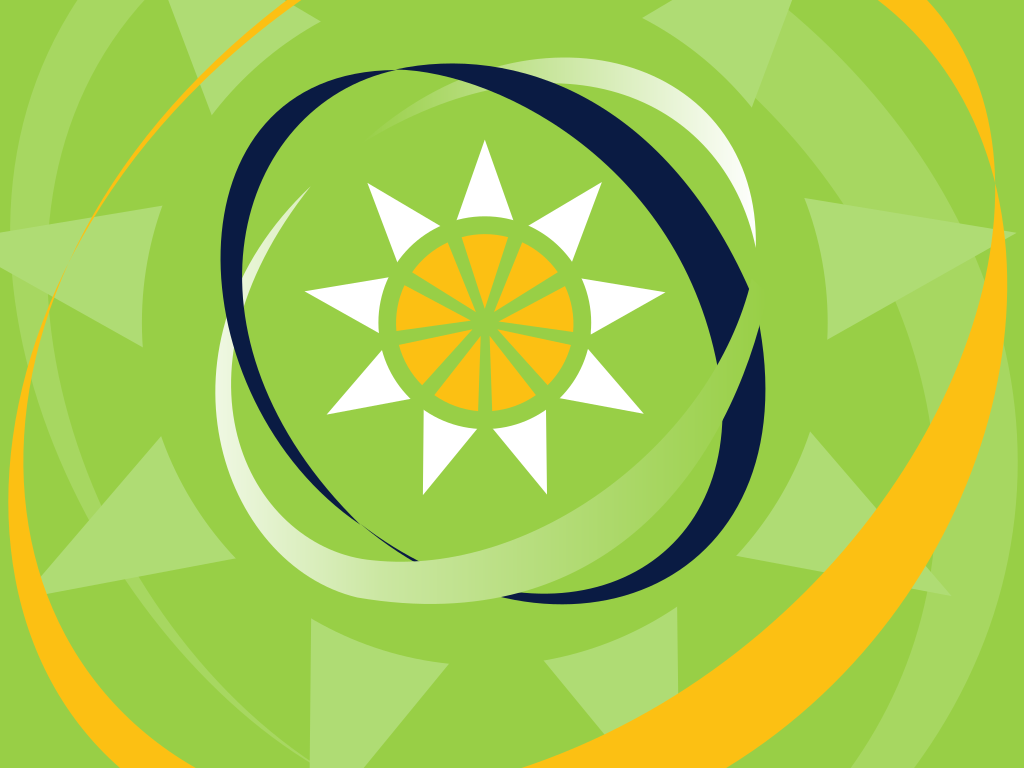
Flag of the Organisation of Eastern Caribbean States

Flag of the Union of South American Nations

=== Asia ===
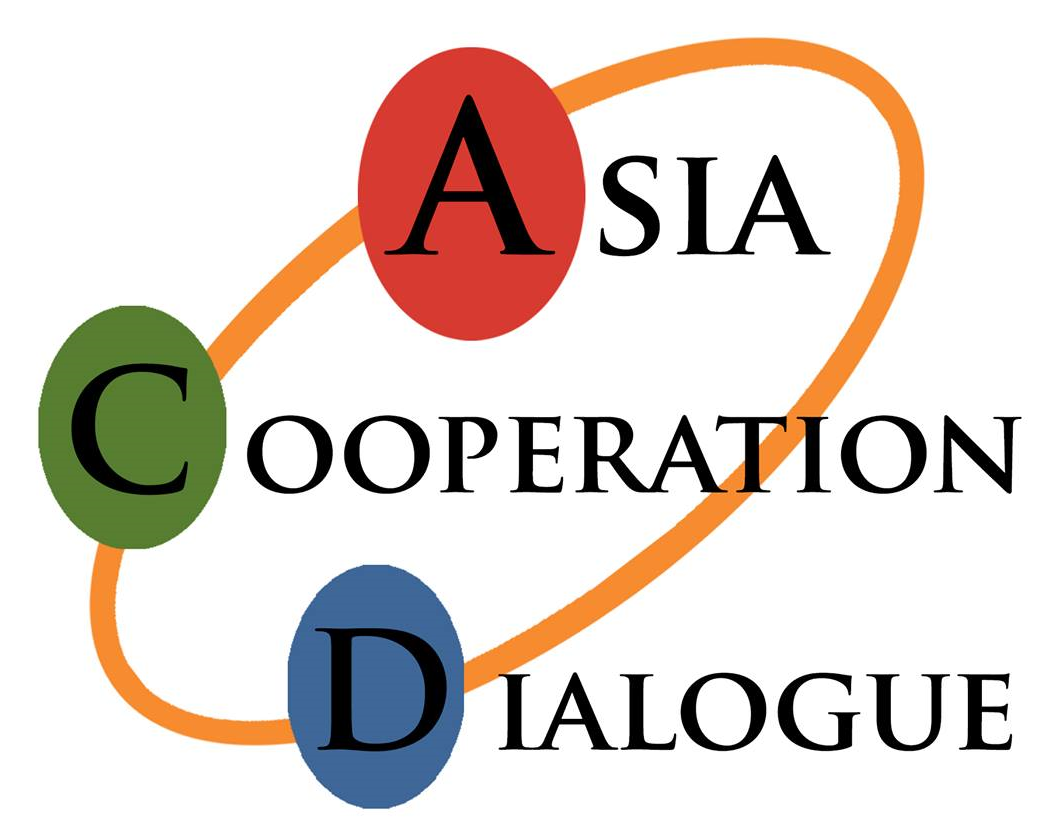
Flag of the Asia Cooperation Dialogue

Flag of the Gulf Cooperation Council

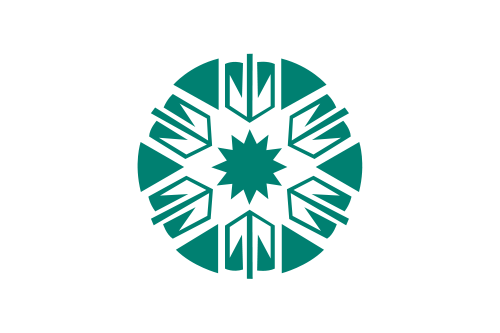
Flag of the International Organization of Turkic Culture (TÜRKSOY)

Flag of the Organization of Turkic States

=== Europe ===
Flag of the Baltic Assembly

Flag of the Benelux (unofficial)

Flag of the Central European Free Trade Agreement

Flag of the Council of Europe

Flag of the European Free Trade Association

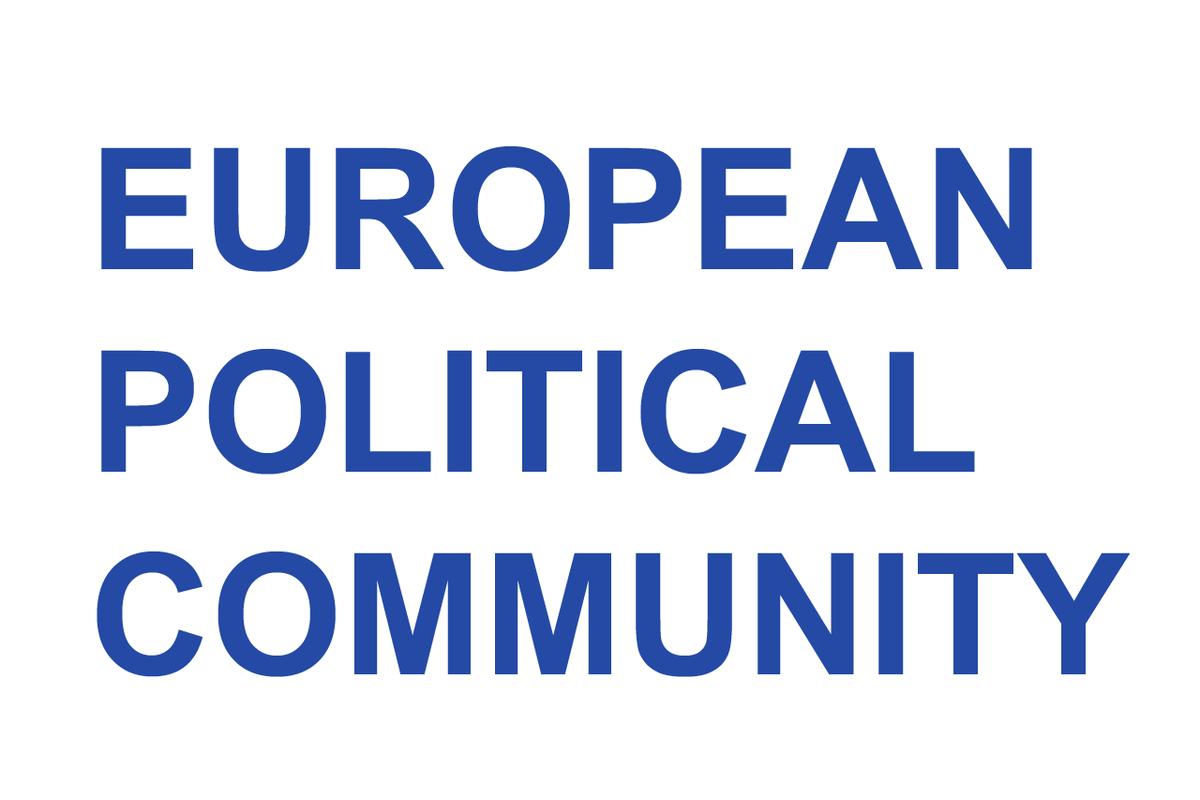
Flag of the European Political Community

Flag of the European Union

Flag of the Nordic Council

== International sports federations ==
=== Global ===
Multi-sport

Flag of the International Military Sports Council

Flag of the International Olympic Committee

Flag of the International Paralympic Committee

Flag of the International World Games Association

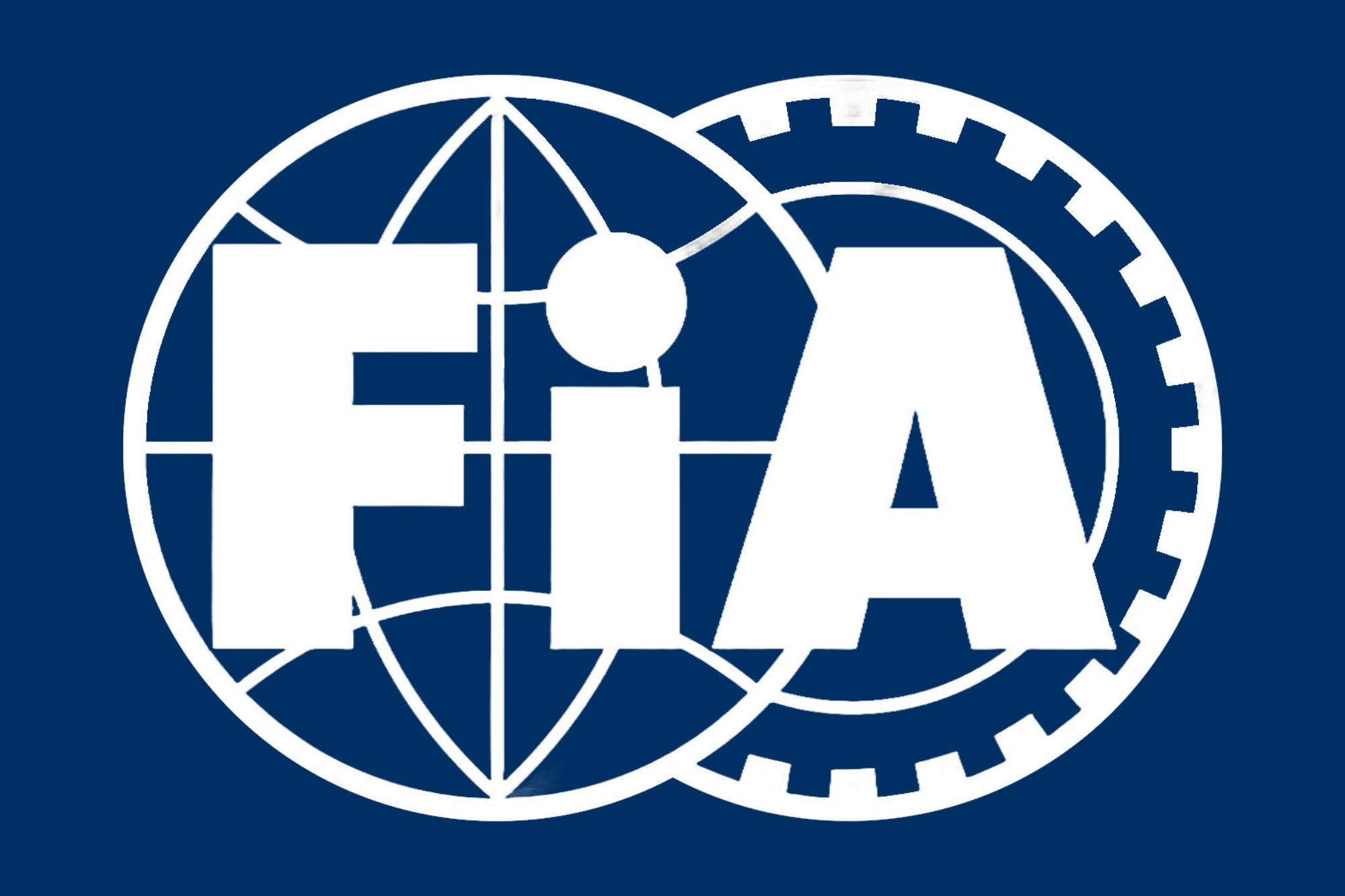
Flag of the FIA

Single sport

Flag of FIFA

=== Cultural and linguistic ===
Flag of the Commonwealth Games Federation

Flag of the Jeux de la Francophonie

=== Continental ===
Flag of the Association of National Olympic Committees of Africa (African Games)

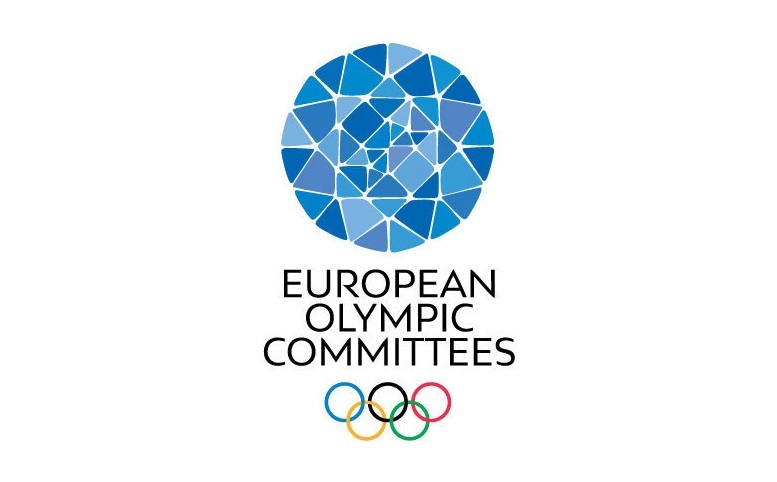
Flag of the European Olympic Committees (European Games)

Flag of the Oceania National Olympic Committees (Pacific Games)

== Former organisations ==
Flag of Comecon

Flag of the Central Treaty Organization

Flag of the European Coal and Steel Community

Flag of the League of Nations

Flag of the North American Free Trade Agreement

Flag of the Organisation of African Unity

Flag of the Southeast Asia Treaty Organization (SEATO)

Flag of the Western European Union

Flag of the Western Union

== See also ==
- Flag of Earth
- Anthems of international organizations
