= Let Us All Unite and Celebrate Together =

Anthem of the African Union

- Flag of the African Union
- Official anthem of the African Union Former anthem of the Organisation of African Unity
- Also known as: Arabic: فلنتحد جميعا ونحتفل معا; French: Unissons-nous tous et célébrons ensemble; Portuguese: Vamos todos nos unir e celebrar juntos; Spanish: Unámonos todos y celebremos juntos; Swahili: Tuungane na tusherehekee
- Lyrics: Tsegaye Gabre-Medhin
- Music: Arthur Mudogo Kemoli, 1986
- Adopted: 1986 (by the Organisation of African Unity); 2002 (by the African Union)

The "African Union Anthem" (Note: Often abbreviated as AU Anthem) also known by its incipit "Let Us All Unite and Celebrate Together" (Arabic: فلنتحد جميعا ونحتفل معا; French: Unissons-nous tous et célébrons ensemble; Portuguese: Vamos todos nos unir e celebrar juntos; Spanish: Unámonos todos y celebremos juntos; Swahili: Hebu wote kuungana na kusherehekea pamoja) is the anthem of the African Union (AU). It was written as a poem titled "Proud to be African" by Ethiopian poet Tsegaye Gabre-Medhin, while the music was composed by Kenyan choral composer Arthur Mudogo Kemoli. It had served as the anthem of the former Organisation of African Unity since 1986 before being adopted by the newly formed Union in 2002.

== History ==
The anthem was written as a poem titled "Proud to be African" by Ethiopian poet Tsegaye Gabre-Medhin. Kenyan choral composer Arthur Mudogo Kemoli composed the anthem's music in Dakar, Senegal in 1986 and it was selected as the anthem of the AU's predecessor, the Organisation of African Unity (OAU), as part of a contest. That same year, (Note: Some sources say 1976.) the OAU honoured Tsegaye with the OAU African Unity Anthem Prize for writing the anthem.

After the AU's formation in 2002, it organised a contest to establish official symbols of the Union, including a flag, emblem and anthem. The competition's brief for the anthem included that its short form for official ceremonies (first stanzas or two verses and chorus) should not exceed one minute in length and that each entry should include lyrics, sheet music, a good recording and an explanatory note and be submitted in one of the working languages of the AU. The brief stated that the symbols should draw inspiration from a number of values including struggle, independence, labour, unity, justice and hope. The competition was to last until 25 April 2003 and the three best entries were to be presented and the symbols chosen at a session of the AU Assembly in Maputo, Mozambique in July 2003 with the first-, second- and third-place winners receiving US$7,000, US$5,000 and US$3,000 cash prizes, respectively.

The competition did not attract many participants; eventually, it was abandoned and the old OAU symbols were instead retained as the new symbols for the AU (including the OAU anthem, which was retained as the anthem of the new bloc).

== Lyrics ==
English version

I
Let us all unite and celebrate together
The victories won for our liberation
Let us dedicate ourselves to rise together
To defend our liberty and unity

Chorus:
O Sons and Daughters of Africa
Flesh of the Sun and Flesh of the Sky
Let us make Africa the Tree of Life

II
Let us all unite and sing together
To uphold the bonds that frame our destiny
Let us dedicate ourselves to fight together
For lasting peace and justice on earth

Chorus

III
Let us all unite and toil together
To give the best we have to Africa
The cradle of mankind and fount of culture
Our pride and hope at break of dawn.

Chorus

Arabic version

I
هيا بنا لتوحيد صفوفنا والاحتفال
بالانتصارات املحققة لتحريرنا
كرجل واحد هيا بنا جميعا
للدفاع عن حريتنا ووحدتنا

كورال:
يا أبناء وبنات أفريقيا
لب الشمس وكبد السماء
أفريقيا شجرة الحياة

II
هيا بنا لتوحيد صفوفنا بالاناشيد
نرفع اصواتنا بالروابط نقرر
مصيرنا للكفاح نكرس حياتنا
من أجل السلام على اراضينا

كورال

III
هيا بنا لتوحيد صفوفنا والعمل
بكل ما في وسعنا في سبيل أفريقيا
نضحي بأنفسنا مهد البشر أفريقيا
هي عزتنا والفجر أملنا

كورال

French version

I
Unissons-nous tous et célébrons ensemble,
Les victoires de notre libération.
Engageons-nous et levons-nous tous comme un seul homme,
Pour défendre notre liberté et unité.

Refrain:
Oh Chers fils et filles de l'Afrique,
Chair du Soleil et Chair du Ciel,
Faisons de l'Afrique l'Arbre de Vie.

II
Unissons-nous et chantons tous ensemble,
Pour maintenir les liens de notre destin.
Consacrons-nous et combattons tous comme un seul homme,
Pour la paix et la justice durables sur terre.

Refrain

III
Unissons-nous et travaillons dur ensemble,
Pour donner le meilleur de nous à l'Afrique,
Berceau de l'humanité et source de la culture,
Notre fierté et l´espérance au levé du jour.

Refrain

Portuguese version

I
Unámo-nos e celebramos juntos,
As vitórias da nossa libertação.
Dediquemo-nos e levantemos todos,
Para defender nossa liberdade e unidade.

Coro:
Oh filhos e filhas de África,
Essência do Sol e Essência do Céu,
Façamos de África a Árvore da Vida.

II
Unámo-nos e cantemos juntos,
Para manter laços do nosso destino.
Dediquemo-nos e combatemos todos,
Para paz durável e justiça sobre a Terra.

Coro

III
Unámo-nos e trabalhemos juntos,
Para dar melhor de nós à África,
Berço da humanidade e fonte da cultura,
Nosso orgulho e esperança para sempre.

Coro

Spanish version

I
Unámonos y celebremos juntos
Las victorias ganadas para nuestra liberación
Dediquémonos a levantarnos juntos
Para defender nuestra libertad y unidad.

Coro:
Oh hijos y hijas de África
Carne del sol y carne del cielo
Hagamos de África el Árbol de la vida.

II
Unámonos y cantemos juntos
Para mantener lazos que enmarcan nuestro destino
Dediquémonos a luchar juntos
Por una paz y justicia en la tierra.

Coro

III
Unámonos y trabajemos juntos
Para dar lo mejor que tenemos a África
La cuna de la humanidad y fuente de la cultura
Nuestro orgullo y esperanza del amanecer.

Coro

Swahili version

I
Tuungane sote na tusherehekee pamoja
Ushindi kwa ukumbozi wetu
Tujitoe wenyewe tusimame pamoja
Kuulii nda uhuru na umoja wetu.

Kwaya:
Enyi bwana na binti wa Afrika
Mwili wa jua, mwili wa Anga
Tuifanye Afrika m´ti wa uzima.

II
Tuungane sote tuimbe pamoja
Kuenzi mshika mano hatima yetu
Tujitoe wenyewe kupamba na pamoja
Uhuru na umoja vitawale.

Kwaya

III
Tuungane sote na tujibidishe
Kutoa kilicho bora kwa Afrika
Chimbuko la wana dam chemchem yauta maduni
Tumaini letu wakati wa mafarakano.

Kwaya

== See also ==
- Anthems of international organizations
