= Yadesa Bojia =

Ethiopian graphic designer and artist

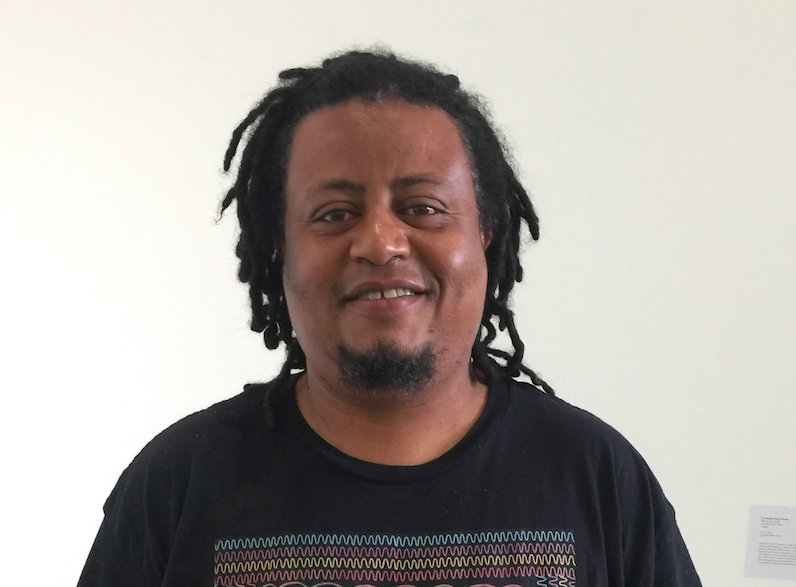
- Born: July 9, 1970 (age 55); Ambo, Shewa Province, Ethiopian Empire (present-day Ambo, Oromia Region, Ethiopia)
- Education: Seattle Pacific University, Seattle Central Community College
- Known for: Art, Graphic design, Political activism
- Notable work: African Union flag
- Style: African impressionism
- Website: yadesabojia.com

Yadesa Bojia (Oromo: Yaaddeessaa Booji'aa, Amharic: ያደሳ ቦጂያ; born July 9, 1970, in Ambo, Ethiopia) is a Seattle-based Ethiopian graphic designer and artist. Bojia has exhibited regionally since 2006. In 2010, he rose to international acclaim when his design was selected for the African Union's flag. Bojia has shown his work in exhibitions, completed commissioned works, and given public talks about the themes of his work, including human rights, minority rights, Africa, and justice. Bojia's style as a painter draws on African impressionism.

== Biography ==
=== Career ===
Bojia was educated in the Art and Visual Communication field in Seattle. He came to the United States at age 25 in 1995 as a political refugee. He is from the Oromo ethnic group, the largest in Ethiopia.

His style as a fine art painter draws on African impressionism. He works primarily in acrylic and oil, using bold colors and shadows. In commentary about his work, Bojia claims that he paints to raise awareness of issues related to human rights.

Bojia has been commissioned to paint a variety of works, from portraits to abstract images of themes central to justice and equality. Since 2006, his work has been featured in art exhibitions in the Pacific Northwest region. He has been invited to speak on panels and in interviews about his work.

==== African Union flag ====
Bojia's profile as an artist rose to international significance in late 2009 when he found out his design was selected by a jury to be the winner of an international competition to create the new flag design for the African Union. Bojia learned his was the winning design when he was watching Larry King Live on television and saw his flag projected behind then president of the African Union, Muammar el-Qaddafi of Libya. Bojia then called the competition organizers who confirmed he was the winner. In 2010 his family was flown to Addis Ababa, Ethiopia, to accept the award.

News of his success brought media coverage in his country of origin and among the Ethiopian Diaspora, including from his ethnic group, the Oromo people. After receiving this award, Bojia has had increased visibility as an artist. In addition to regional showings of his paintings in exhibitions, Bojia has been invited to speak about art, human rights, minority rights, Ethiopia, and Black Lives Matter in interviews, conferences, and at public gatherings.

Bojia has also been recognized as a community leader. In 2020, alarmed with misinformation about the coronavirus circulating in Amharic, he made Facebook Live videos reading CDC guidelines in Amharic to ensure immigrants understood the novel disease and public health guidelines.

== Exhibitions ==
- Art/Not Terminal Gallery at Seattle Center "Truth Be Told" Dec. 2, 2016 – Jan. 2, 2017; Solo show
- Columbia City Gallery, "Black Lives Matter," May 2015; Group show
- Northwest African American Museum, "Ethiopian Treasures, November 6, 2010; Group show, curated by Leul
- Northwest African American Museum, June 26 – August 7, 2010; Solo show, curated by Flavia S. Zúñiga-West
- Seattle Municipal Building, Group show, curated by Esther Ervin
- Tashiro/Kaplan Building in Pioneer Square, solo show, "Interpreting the Black Journey," Jan 6 – April 15, 2010
- Seattle Pacific Science Center, "Lucy's Legacy Exhibit," September 8 – March 9; Group show, curated by Diana Johns
- South Seattle Community College Gallery, "Here to There," May 19 – June 13, 2008; Solo show
- Studio 911, Yadesa Bojia, November – December, 2007; Solo show
- Artist Gallery of Seattle, "The Invisibles," August – September 2007; Solo show, curated by Bryan Ubagns
- Artist Gallery of Seattle, Yadesa Bojia, December 2006 – June 2007; Group show

== Selected publications ==
- Contributor, All Power: Visual Legacies of the Black Panther Party (2016) Minor Matters Books. ISBN 9780990603672
- Illustrator, Lucy's Legacy: The Hidden Treasures of Ethiopia: Recipes from Afar and Near (2008); Editor, Judy Gouldthorpe. Documentary Media. ISBN 9781933245140
- Author, The Art of Yadesa Bojia (2020); Editor, Yadesa Bojia. ISBN 9780578626697

== Personal life ==
Yadesa Bojia was born in Ambo, Ethiopia, to a well-to-do family. When Bojia was two years old, his father, Zewge Bojia, was killed by a member of the revolutionary army during the Ethiopian civil war. Bojia's father had been a politician, elected by popular vote three times to serve in the Ethiopian parliament during the reign of the monarch Haile Selassie. He had also co-founded the Mecha and Tulema Self-Help Organization. After the death of his father, Bojia and his family moved to Addis Ababa where Bojia attended elementary and secondary schools before immigrating to the United States.

As a child, Bojia said he admired the bold lines of Orthodox Christian drawings and these images spurred his interest in art.

One of Bojia's brothers lives in Washington, D.C., and was interviewed by Thomas Friedman for his book, Thank You For Being Late.

Bojia is married to Hewan Gebremicheal, and they have two children, Becca and Isaiah Bojia.
