= ASEAN Rise =

ASEAN Rise is the 40th anniversary song for ASEAN Association of Southeast Asian Nations. Singaporeans made the song, with lyrics written by Dick Lee and the music arranged by Kenn C. The song was performed by Stefanie Sun, also a Singaporean. The official ASEAN anthem is The Asean Way.
