= Pierre M'Vouama =

Congolese politician and engineer

Pierre M'Vouama was a Congolese politician and telecommunications engineer. Vouama was one of the early activists of the Congolese Students Association (AEC) in France, affiliated to FEANF. He was named Minister of Information, Youth, Popular Education, Culture and Arts in the government of Ambroise Noumazalaye formed on April 26, 1966.
