= The NATO Hymn =

Anthem of NATO

Hymne de l'OTAN
English: The NATO Hymn
- Organizational anthem of the North Atlantic Treaty Organization
- Music: André Reichling, 1989
- Adopted: 3 January 2018

"The NATO Hymn" (French: "Hymne de l'OTAN") is the organizational anthem of the North Atlantic Treaty Organization (NATO). It is an instrumental piece, composed in 1989 by André Reichling, a Luxembourgish military officer and a member of its military band. It was used unofficially for many years before being formally adopted in January 2018.

== History ==
Initial proposals for adopting an organizational anthem for NATO date back to 1958, its tenth anniversary. A "NATO Song" was publicly performed, but not adopted and a “NATO ceremonial march” was written to be performed during visits of dignitaries to NATO headquarters. In 1960, British Royal Air Force marshal Edward Chilton proposed combining members states' national anthems into a single composition as the organizational anthem.

In 1989, to commemorate NATO's 40th anniversary, Luxembourgish military band officer André Reichling composed an instrumental musical piece titled "The NATO Hymn" and it was performed at an anniversary gala that year. Used as an unofficial anthem at many NATO events in subsequent years, it was formally adopted on 3 January 2018.

== See also ==
- Anthems of international organizations
