= Song of the United Armies =

Anthem of the Warsaw Pact

"Песня объединённых армий"

Song
- Language: Russian
- English title: Song of the United Armies
- Published: 1958
- Genre: Military march
- Composer: Boris Aleksandrov
- Lyricist: Lev Oshanin

Song of the United Armies (Russian: Песня объединённых армий; Romanized: Pesnya ob Yedinonnykh Armiy) was a military march used as the anthem of the Warsaw Pact, written in 1958.

== Creation ==
The music of the song was composed by Boris Aleksandrov, and the lyrics were written by Lev Oshanin. It was written in 1958. It became the anthem of the Warsaw Pact. There was originally a version that included China, but this was removed after the Sino-Soviet split and replaced with Hungary.

== Reception ==
Song of the United Armies was awarded first prize at the military-patriotic song competition in 1985.

== Usage ==
Song of the United Armies was used as the Anthem of the Warsaw Pact.

The song was used in newsreels. It was featured in the 1991 Czech film "Tank Battalyon". In that film, it was performed by KAPPSA and sung by K. Gerasimov. The song was also used in the end credits of the 1983 British film "Red Monarch," but with different lyrics.

There is a version of the song sung in Hungarian.

== Lyrics ==
=== Original ===
Russian	English
Мы не хотим войны, но снова Коль враг нарушит наш покой, За мир и счастье мы готовы На грозный бой, на правый бой. Мы на удар в ответ ударим, Страна Советов и Китай, Поляк и чех, румын, болгарин - Попробуй нас пересчитай! Припев: Друзья, друзья, сухим держите порох, Друзья, друзья, равняйте крепкий строй! За детский смех на солнечных просторах, За вольный труд, за вольный труд готовы мы на бой! Враги надеются на атом, Но он не даст врагам побед. Труда и разума солдаты, На всё имеем мы ответ! Коварен атом их незрячий, Но знаем мы наверняка: Живое сердце больше значит, Огнём командует рука! Друзья, друзья, сухим держите порох, Друзья, друзья, равняйте крепкий строй! За детский смех на солнечных просторах, За вольный труд, за вольный труд готовы мы на бой! Наш край с огнями трудовыми Пусть только тронет подлый враг - Пол-человечества поднимет Свой бронированный кулак! Мы в битвах на любом плацдарме В огонь и смерть пойдём вперёд, Единство наших братских армий Ещё раз жизнь Земле спасёт! Друзья, друзья, сухим держите порох, Друзья, друзья, равняйте крепкий строй! За детский смех на солнечных просторах, За вольный труд, за вольный труд готовы мы на бой!	We don't want war, but again If the enemy disturbs our peace, For peace and happiness we are ready For a terrible fight, For a just fight. We will strike back, The country of Soviets and China, Pole and Czech, Romanian, Bulgarian - Try to count us! Chorus: Friends, friends, keep your powder dry, Friends, friends, line up a strong line! For children's laughter in the sunny expanses, For free labor, for free labor, We are ready to fight! The enemies are hoping for the atom, But it will not give the enemies victories. Soldiers of labor and reason, We have an answer to everything! Their blind atom is treacherous, But we know for sure: A living heart means more, A hand commands with fire! Friends, friends, keep your powder dry, Friends, friends, line up a strong line! For children's laughter in the sunny expanses, For free labor, for free labor, We are ready to fight! Our land with the fires of labor Let the vile enemy only touch - Half of humanity will raise His armored fist! In battles on any bridgehead, we Will go forward into fire and death, The unity of our fraternal armies will once again save the life of the Earth! Friends, friends, keep your powder dry, Friends, friends, form a strong line! For children's laughter in the sunny expanses, For free labor, for free labor, we are ready to fight!

=== Post-Sino-Soviet split ===
Russian	English
Мы не хотим войны, но снова, Коль враг нарушит наш покой, За мир и счастье мы готовы На грозный бой, на правый бой. Мы на удар в ответ ударим: Советский воин и мадьяр, Поляк и чех, румын, болгарин - Ответят на любой удар! Припев: Друзья, друзья, Сухим держите порох! Друзья, друзья, Равняйте крепкий строй! За детский смех На солнечных просторах, За вольный труд, за вольный труд Готовы мы на бой! Наш край с огнями трудовыми Пусть только тронет подлый враг - Пол-человечества поднимет Свой бронированный кулак! Мы в битвах на любом плацдарме В огонь и смерть пойдём вперёд. Единство наших братских армий Ещё раз жизнь Земле спасёт! Друзья, друзья, Сухим держите порох! Друзья, друзья, Равняйте крепкий строй! За детский смех На солнечных просторах, За вольный труд, за вольный труд Готовы мы на бой!	We don't want war, but again, If the enemy disturbs our peace, For peace and happiness we are ready For a terrible battle, for a just battle. We will strike back: Soviet soldier and Magyar, Pole and Czech, Romanian, Bulgarian - Will respond to any blow! Chorus: Friends, friends, Keep your powder dry! Friends, friends, Form a strong line! For children's laughter In the sunny expanses, For free labor, for free labor We are ready for battle! Our land with the fires of labor Let the vile enemy touch - Half of humanity will raise Its armored fist! In battles on any bridgehead We will go forward into fire and death. The unity of our fraternal armies Will once again save the life of the Earth! Friends, friends, Keep your powder dry! Friends, friends, Form a strong line! For children's laughter In the sunny expanses, For free labor, for free labor We are ready for battle!
