= ASEAN Song of Unity =

1997–2008 unofficial anthem of the Association of Southeast Asian Nations

External videos
- ASEAN Song of Unity, the unofficial anthem of ASEAN

ASEAN Hymn (official name ASEAN Song of Unity) was the hymn of the Association of Southeast Asian Nations. The lyrics were written by Nicanor Tiongson and the music was composed by Ryan Cayabyab. The ASEAN Hymn was the unofficial ASEAN anthem until the adoption of the official anthem, The ASEAN Way.

It is the winning entry of an anthem competition by the Committee on Culture and Information under Secretary General Ajit Singh in 1997. However, the song was not officially adopted, and the competition was not sanctioned by the ASEAN standing committee.
