= Hymn to the United Nations =

1971 anthem by W. H. Auden and Pau Casals

- Lyrics: W. H. Auden, 1971
- Music: Pau Casals, 1971

Audio sample
- Instrumental version: file; help

The Hymn to the United Nations is an anthem composed to mark the 26th anniversary of the founding of the United Nations.

== History ==
On the request of then United Nations Secretary-General U Thant, Hymn to the United Nations was performed on the occasion of its 26th anniversary, on 24 October 1971, by Pau Casals, the lyrics to which were penned by the poet W. H. Auden.

Thant first approached Casals, who was a personal friend, looking to create a hymn to peace and hoping for the song to be based on the preamble of the Charter of the United Nations. Thant later commissioned Auden to write the poem after Casals requested one to set to music. Auden completed his work in three days time. The finished work, scored for chorus and orchestra, takes approximately seven minutes to perform. The piece was sung by the Manhattan School of Music Chorale. However, there were never any plans to adopt the song as the organization's official anthem.

== Lyrics ==
English

Eagerly, musician,
Sweep your string,
So we may sing,
Elated, optative,
Our several voices
Interblending,
Playfully contending,
Not interfering
But co-inhering,
For all within
The cincture
of the sound,
Is holy ground
Where all are brothers,
None faceless others.

Let mortals beware
Of words, for
With words we lie,
Can say peace
When we mean war,
Foul thought, speak fair
And promise falsely,
But song is true:
Let music for peace
Be the paradigm,
For peace means to change
At the right time,
As the world clock
Goes "tick" and "tock".

So may the story
Of our human city
Presently move
Like music, when
Begotten notes
New notes beget
Making the flowing
Of time a growing
Till what it could be,
At last it is,
Where even sadness
Is a form of gladness,
Where fate is freedom,
Grace and surprise.

== See also ==
- Flag of the United Nations
- Anthems of international organizations
- Earth anthem
