= Esther Ervin =

American sculptor

- Born: Somerville, New Jersey, U.S.

Esther Ervin is an American sculptor based in Seattle, Washington.

== Early life and education ==
Esther Ervin was born in Somerville, New Jersey. She earned a BS in Biology from the University of California, Irvine with studies at the American University of Beirut, and an MFA in BioMedical Illustration from the University of California, Long Beach. She focused on bio-medical illustration and sculpture.

== Career and influences ==
Ervin has created public works for Liberty Bank, in Seattle. She consulted on the design of the Liberty Bank Building in Seattle's Central District. She earned a Gregory M. Robinson Scholarship for Pratt Fine Arts Center.

After a brief career in insurance and securities, Esther was awarded a residency and the Gregory M. Robinson scholarship at Pratt Fine Arts Center in 2008, where she studied jewelry-metalsmithing and welding. In 2009, she had a residency at the Dr. James W. Washington, Jr. and Mrs. Janie Rogella Washington Foundation, in Seattle, where she incorporated materials found on-site into new work. She acted as the director of the James Washington Foundation for four years, implementing capital improvements; hosting artists-in-residence, youth programs and site tours. For these accomplishments, she was selected in 2014 to receive the “Living Legacy of Phenomenal People” award by the Central Area Chamber of Commerce. In 2020 she was invited to an Artist-In-Residence Collaborative at the same Foundation along with Christina Reed, Eve Sanford, Erin Shigaki and Carol Williams. As well as completing independent works based on the theme of "What Color is Color?" they combined their skills to create a three-dimensional piece that is permanently housed on the premises.

Esther continues exploring new techniques, and works in various mediums, often focusing on environmental or political subjects and abstract works. Her one-of-a-kind jewelry has been exhibited in Washington, Oregon, Beijing, China; Vilnius and Palanga, Lithuania and in Legnica and Gdansk, Poland.

She has 18 permanent works installed at the Liberty Bank Building on 24th Avenue and Union Street, Seattle, WA. These are 4 etched glass canopy panels depicting Seattle's redlined Central District, 11 concrete and tile benches and 3 bronze salmon sculptures in a water feature. She was also project coordinator and financial manager for the entire artistic project, coordinating installations for six other artists from 2016 to 2019. In 2020 Esther's work was installed at the Pavilion Marketplace, a 14' x 4’ steel panel titled “Cowrie Cloth,” on Jackson Street, near 23rd Avenue, Seattle, WA.

While consistently generating and exhibiting jewelry and mixed-media work, Esther has curated over 50 exhibitions; participated in numerous group exhibits in California, Oregon and Washington states; been on local and out-of-state juries and had five solo exhibitions. She is a member or participant in several arts organizations including the Onyx Fine Arts Collective, Puget Sound Book Artists, the Book Arts Guild, the Book Club of Washington, Center on Contemporary Art (CoCA) and the Seattle Metals Guild.

She has also researched preservation of documents and photographs from the late 1800s to the present and printed "Self-Preservation of Documents and Photographs," 1st Edition, which was first presented for the Association for African American Historical Research and Preservation Second Annual Conference at the Museum of History and Industry, Seattle, WA., Feb. 5, 2005. Esther received a grant from the Seattle Office of Arts and Cultural Affairs, now known as Seattle Arts & Culture, to support this research.

In 2021 Ervin was one of five artists selected for Amazon's artist in residence program.

In 2022 she was featured in Crosscut media's Black Arts Legacies
