= Kominternlied =

Anthem of the Comintern

Kominternlied sung by Ernst Busch

Kominternlied (English: Comintern Song) was the anthem of the Comintern, an international communist organization.

== History ==
The authors of the original poem, written 1926, were Franz Jahnke and Maxim Vallentin. Hanns Eisler composed the melody. The song was written for "Red Mouthpiece", dedicated to the 10th anniversary of the Comintern in 1929, and was first performed in March 1929 in Berlin. In November 1930, during his stay in Moscow, Eisler performed the song at the apartment of composer Nikolay Chemberdzhi. He liked the song very much, and in the January 1931 issue of the magazine "For Proletarian Music", a Russian version of the song was published. In that version, only the first stanza was a translation from the original German - the poet Ilya Frenkel wrote the Russian version for this song.

Ernst Busch sang it in Moscow, in 1936, and recorded it on shellac.

After World War II, Stephan Hermlin wrote a new text for Eisler's music in 1950s Berlin, retaining the second stanza from the original song. It was named "Song of the Working People" (Lied der Werktätigen).

== Languages ==
The song is in many languages other than German and Russian, like English, Dutch, Chinese, Spanish, French, Norwegian, and Italian.
