= André Reichling =

Luxembourgish military bandmaster (1956–2020)

André Reichling (1 February 1956 – 7 September 2020) was a Luxembourgish military officer and musician. A lieutenant colonel, he served as the bandmaster of the Luxembourg Military Band between 1986 and 2011.

== Career ==
Reichling grew up in Differdange, and was a trumpeter in the Luxembourg Military Band until succeeding Pierre Nimax Sr. as the bandmaster in 1986. He composed the NATO Hymn in 1989 for the 40th anniversary of the organisation, which formally became the official anthem for NATO in 2018. In 2011, Jean-Claude Braun succeeded Reichling as bandmaster. He died in 2020.
