= Black African Students Federation in France =

Organization of African students in France

The Black African Students Federation in France (French: Fédération des étudiants d'Afrique noire en France, abbreviated FEANF) was an organization of African students in France. FEANF was influenced by the French Communist Party, and saw the struggle against French colonialism in Africa as part of a wider struggle against Western imperialism. FEANF played an important role for the formation of communist organizations in Francophone Africa. In addition, FEANF largely contributed to creating a centralized voice that united all African student groups in France, while their actions highlighted the greater disparities within the French colonial system.

== Founding ==
FEANF was founded in 1950, when a preliminary congress was held in April 1950 in Lyon, followed by a meeting in Bordeaux in December 1950. The Bordeaux meeting was attended by cells of African students from Paris, Toulouse, Montpellier and Bordeaux. The Paris group, led by Amadou-Mahtar M'Bow and Louis Atayi, dominated the debates. The Bordeaux meeting adopted the FEANF statues, which called for the unification of all African student associations in France. Among its first goals was to “defend the material and moral interests of the students.” The statues also stated that FEANF was independent of any political party. The Lyon cell soon affiliated itself to the organization soon afterwards.

== First and second congresses ==
The first federal congress of FEANF was held March 21–22, 1951 in Paris. The congress elected an Executive Committee, which included Solange Faladé (medical student from Dahomey) as President, Amadou-Mahtar M'bow (from Senegal) as General Secretary, N'ki Traoré (from Guinea, also the Secretary of the RDA Students Association) as Joint General Secretary and Abdou Moumouni (from Niger, also the editor of Les étudiants anti-colonialistes) as Treasurer. By the end of 1951 FEANF had around 1,000 members.

Politically, the first FEANF Executive Committee was rapidly seen as very 'moderate'. Its President tried to mobilize a separate structure, GAREP, but failed to gather any sizeable number of followers from the founding core of FEANF. Compared to FEANF, GAREP was reluctant to have contacts with pro-Soviet structures.

The second FEANF congress was held April 14–15, 1952. At the second congress, the leadership was taken over by members of the African Democratic Rally (RDA). The organization declared its support for African independence. There was also a notable Senegalese dominance over the new Executive Committee. The medical student Edouard Sankhalé became the new FEANF Chairman. Mamadou Samb became Vice Chairman. Both Sankhalé and Samb were also in the RDA Students Association leadership. Alioune Bâ (law student, later a prominent member of the African Independence Party, PAI) became General Secretary, Youssoupha Sylla (medical student, activist of the RDA Students Association) First Joint Secretary, Babacar Niang (science student, head of the publication La voix de l'Afrique Noire) whilst Abdou Moumouni retained the position as Treasurer. Except for Moumouni, all of these men were Senegalese. After the change in leadership, FEANF began to have contacts with the Prague-based International Union of Students. Eventually, FEANF became an affiliate of IUS.

== Struggle for independence ==
In 1954 the General Students Union of West Africa (UGEAO) was founded in Dakar. FEANF and UGEAO worked closely. Both were oriented towards Marxism, and opposed the more moderate line adopted by RDA.

In 1956, under the leadership of the Guinean medical student Charles Diané, FEANF adopted a more radical line towards demanding independence. The organization opposed the loi Cadre, which it considered as a move to Balkanize Africa. FEANF preferred that rather than creating many separate African states, a federation be created in West Africa. Gradually FEANF became more vocal in its criticism against the increasingly collaborationist positions of RDA, in spite of the fact that many FEANF leaders had been members of RDA. In May 1958 the FEANF organ L'Étudiant d'Afrique noire expressed sharp criticism against RDA leader Sékou Touré for not having publicly called for a 'No'-vote (i.e. a vote for independence) in the upcoming constitutional referendum. In June the FEANF leadership decided that the organization would campaign for the 'No'. During the summer vacation, many FEANF cadres travelled to Africa and took part in pro-independence mobilizations there. In August 1958 FEANF took part in forming a united front for campaigning for independence, together with UGEAO, UGTAN, RDA Students Association, RJDA and the African Youth Council.

The rift between RDA and FEANF brought FEANF closer to the main rival of RDA, the African Regroupment Party.

Among their many initiatives, they strove to improve the standard of living for African students. The grants students received to study in France did not include provisions for housing. Thus, many students struggled to find housing, especially because many landlords were unwilling to rent to Africans. The efforts of the FEANF, along with the government of Dakar and the Ministry of Overseas France, a hotel was purchased specifically for students from French West Africa. In 1951, the Maison de la France d’Outre Mer was completed in Paris. Along with housing, FEANF leaders fought for improved conditions within housing. Many African students could not afford heating and suffered from malnutrition. As a result, a large number succumbed to tuberculosis or venereal diseases.

== French administration response ==
The French became gradually became suspicious of the organization due to its connections with African nationalist and communist groups. The colonial administration developed a system of surveillance to monitor FEANF activities while keeping positive political relations with the group because they represented most African students in France. They sought to maintain the favor of the leaders primarily through the allocation of funding. French administrators granted financial aid to the FEANF for projects concerning housing for colonial students and “cultural care” programs. These programs provided funding for cultural organizations that focused on African arts and culture; for example, approving a folklore troop’s request to receive drums from Dahomey.

Underscoring the French administrators’ actions was a fundamental misunderstanding between themselves and the FEANF. The French believed that student issues stemmed from psychological problems they encountered due to their in-between status as African elites in a French environment. By providing funding, administrators worked to make students feel at home while remedying the culture shock that could affect student performance in academics and lead to physical sickness. However, as the FEANF sought to expose, their problems stemmed from the discrepancies and consequences of the colonial system. France touted that through Western education, they were guiding the next generation of African leaders. However, these students often left France disillusioned and disenchanted by their poor treatment and the inferior status accorded to them. Even though the French took steps to address the tangible issues affecting African students, they failed to take into account that their colonial system as a whole had put these students in this position in the first place.

== National sections ==
FEANF included various territorial/national affiliates. Many of them were French sections of students organization based in the respective territories/countries. As of 1957-1958, the following organizations were affiliated to FEANF;

- Cameroon: Kamerunese National Students Union (UNEK)
- Chad: Chadian Students Association (AET)
- Congo: Congolese Students Association (AEC)
- Dahomey: Dahomeyan Students Association in France (AEDF, a section of General Union of Students and Pupils of Dahomey based in Cotonou)
- French Soudan: Soudanese Students Association in France (AESF, a section of Soudanese Scholar Union based in Bamako)
- Gabon: Gabonese Students Association (AEG)
- Guinea: Guinea Students Association in France (AEGF, a section of General Union of Students and Pupils of Guinea based in Conakry)
- Ivory Coast: Association of Students of the Ivory Coast (AECI, a section of the Students Union of the Ivory Coast based in Abidjan)
- Mauritania: Association of Students of Mauritania in France (AEMF)
- Niger: Nigerien Students Association in France (AENF)
- Oubangui-Chari: Oubangui Students Association (AEO)
- Senegal: Senegalese Students Association in France (AESF)
- Togo: Togolese Students Association (AET, more commonly known as Jeune Togo)
- Upper Volta: Association of Students of Upper Volta in France (AEVF)

== Later phase ==
In 1966 another student movement, MEOCAM, was launched with the objective to compete with FEANF over the influence in the African students community in France. MEOCAM failed to make any lasting impact, though, as it was torn apart by internal conflicts.

In its later phase of existence, FEANF suffered from internal divisions and defections. In 1972 there was a dispute between the Dahomeyan and Cameronian students. In 1975 the Central African students disaffiliated from FEANF, followed by the Gabonese in 1977.

In 1980 the organization was 'dissolved' by the French authorities. This move followed the disbanding of the AED (Dahomey) in 1979 and the closure of the UNEECI in earlier in 1980.
