= Flag of the African Union =

African Union
- Flag of Africa
- Proportion: 2:3
- Adopted: 31 January 2010; 16 years ago
- Design: A dark green map of the African continent, plus the Sinai Peninsula and offshore islands, on a white sun, surrounded by a circle of 55 5-pointed gold (yellow) stars, on a dark green field.
- Designed by: Yadesa Bojia

The current flag of the African Union was adopted at its 14th Ordinary Session of the Assembly of Heads of State and Government, which took place in Addis Ababa on 31 January 2010.

== History ==
During the 8th African Union Summit which took place in Addis Ababa on 29 and 30 January 2007, the Heads of State and Government decided to launch a competition for the selection of a new flag for the Union. They prescribed a green background for the flag symbolising hope of Africa and stars to represent Member States.

Pursuant to this decision, the Muammar Gaddafi-led African Union Commission (AUC) organised a competition for the selection of a new flag for the African Union. The AUC received a total of 106 entries proposed by citizens of 19 African countries and two from the Diaspora. The proposals were then examined by a panel of experts put in place by the African Union Commission and selected from the five African regions for short listing according to the main directions given by the Heads of State and Government. The winning design was created by Yadesa Bojia, an Ethiopian-born American artist and graphic designer.

Flag of the African Union from 2010 to 2011, with 53 stars.

The flag contains a green background symbolizing the hope of Africa and 55 gold stars to represent the Member States. When first adopted, there were 53 stars. However, South Sudan became the 54th member state on 27 July 2011, and Morocco rejoined in January 2017, bringing the total to 55.

=== Previous flag (2004–2010) ===
Flag of the African Union from 2004 to 2010. Was also the flag of the Organization of African Unity from 1970 to 2002.

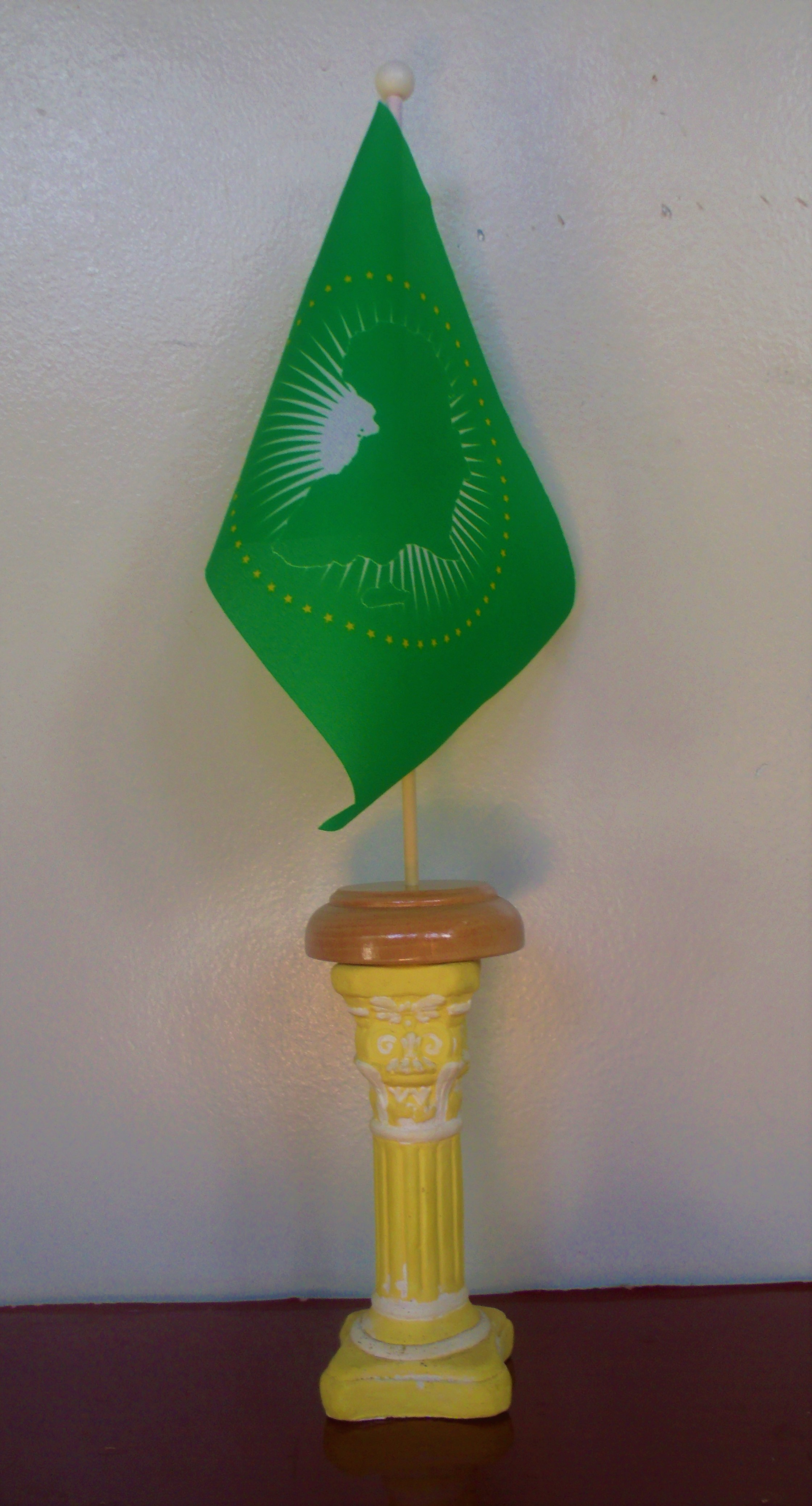
Table model.

The previous flag of the African Union was used from 2004 to 2010 and was composed of a broad green horizontal stripe at the top followed by a narrow band of gold. Below is a broad white stripe bearing the then emblem of the African Union at its center followed by a narrow gold band and broad green stripe at the bottom.

The AU was formed in 2002, without an official flag. In 2003, a competition was announced for designing a new emblem and flag. However, the Assembly of the African Union decided at the Addis Ababa session of 2004 to retain the emblem and flag of its predecessor, the Organisation of African Unity, and adopt them as the new AU flag and emblem. That flag was used from 1970 to 2002 as the OAU's flag.

The color symbolism of the old flag is as follows:

- The color green symbolizes African hopes and aspiration to unity.
- The color gold stands for African wealth and bright future.
- The color white represents the purity of Africa's desire to have genuine friends throughout the world.
- The color red (of the rings [in the center]) stand for African solidarity and the blood shed for the liberation of Africa.

== See also ==
- Emblem of the African Union
- Pan-African colours
- Pan-African flag
