= The ASEAN Way =

Official anthem of the ASEAN

- Official anthem of ASEAN
- Also known as: Southeast Asian Anthem
- Lyrics: Payom Valaiphatchra
- Music: Kittikhun Sodprasert; Sampow Tri-udom
- Adopted: 28 November 2008

Audio sample
- file; help

"The ASEAN Way" is the official anthem of the Association of Southeast Asian Nations (ASEAN). The lyrics were written by Payom Valaiphatchra (Note: Thai: พยอม วลัยพัชรา; RTGS: Phayom Walaiphatchara) and the music composed by Kittikhun Sodprasert (Note: Thai: กิตติคุณ สดประเสริฐ; RTGS: Kittikhun Sotprasoet) and Sampow Tri-udom. (Note: Thai: สำเภา ไตรอุดม; RTGS: Samphao Trai-u-dom) The anthem was the winning entry out of 99 finalists from all ten ASEAN countries in a competition held in 2008 to establish an official anthem.

The ASEAN Way can be sung in multiple languages, with each member state having its own lyrics following ACC Guidelines. However, the English version is used as the official rendition.

== History ==
=== Ideas for creating an ASEAN anthem ===
The idea of having an ASEAN anthem first arose from discussions at the 29th meeting of the ASEAN Committee on Culture and Information in June 1994, where the meeting agreed that ASEAN should have an ASEAN anthem. To be used during various activities Cultural and information. By organizing the 'ASEAN Song Contest Project', the meeting resolved to use money from the ASEAN Cultural Fund.

Later, at the 29th meeting of the ASEAN Committee on Culture and Information in May 1997 in Malaysia. The ASEAN songs entered in the final round were considered. The songs that made it to the final round were songs from Thailand, Malaysia, and the Philippines. The song that won the first prize was the song ASEAN Song of Unity from the Philippines. But this song is not widely known in member countries. Because it is used only in meetings of the ASEAN Committee on Culture and Information and related activities only. As a result, during the ASEAN summits that followed, songs were composed to be played at the meetings from time to time.

=== 2008 ASEAN Anthem Competition ===
In 2008, in order to comply with Chapter 40 of the ASEAN Charter (which states that ASEAN has an ASEAN anthem), a competition was launched and was announced throughout all the member states of ASEAN in a bid to find an official anthem to replace the formerly de facto regional anthem, ASEAN Hymn, which was considered as lacking in gusto and passion by several member states. The Association of Southeast Asian Nations has therefore assigned Thailand to organize the ASEAN Song Contest. The meeting of ASEAN member countries agreed to set the competition format as an open competition. ASEAN has assigned the ASEAN Secretariat in each country to screen the preliminary qualifications and send them to Thailand within September 2008.

The Department of ASEAN Affairs, Ministry of Foreign Affairs, Thailand hosted the first round of the ASEAN Regional Song Contest on 16 October 2008 at the Pullman King Power Hotel, Bangkok, with one judge from each ASEAN member country. The competition was open to all the nationals of ASEAN, limiting to 20 entries per member state. The contest committee selected 10 songs as finalists. From a total of 99 songs submitted, the final round of the competition was held on November 20, 2008. The judging panel consisted of 10 judges from ASEAN in the first round and 3 from countries outside ASEAN, including: Japan, China and Australia.

The panel of judges unanimously voted "The ASEAN Way" of Thailand, which was written by Kittikhun Sodprasert (composition and arrangement), Sampao Traiudom (music), and Phayom Walaipatchara (lyrics), as the official regional anthem of the Association of Southeast Asian Nations in the final round on 20 November 2008. The winning entry received over US$20,000 in reward and was declared as the official regional anthem of Southeast Asia.

The ASEAN Way song was debuted to the public on 28 November 2008 at the Aksara Theatre. The Royal Thai Navy's Royal Thai Navy Band was to perform the song. It was officially used for the opening ceremony of the 14th ASEAN Summit on February 28, 2009, in Cha-am District, Phetchaburi Province, Thailand.

==== Criteria ====
- Language: English
- The anthem should reflect ASEAN dignity, cooperation, and solidarity.
- Should reflect ASEAN's diverse culture and ethnicity
- Should be an original composition
- Must not be longer than 60 seconds

==== Panel of judges ====
- Brunei - Haji Manaf bin Haji Kamis
- Cambodia - Sam-Ang Sam
- Indonesia - Purwacaraka
- Laos - Khamphanh Phonthongsy
- Malaysia - Ayob Ibrahim
- Myanmar (Burma) - Tin Oo Thaung
- Philippines - Agripino V. Diestro
- Singapore - Phoon Yew Tien
- Thailand - Admiral Mom Luang (The Honourable) Usni Pramoj
- Vietnam - Pham Hong Ha

non-ASEAN judges:

- Australia - Sandra Milliken
- China - Bao Yuankai
- Japan - Keiko Harada

== Guidelines ==
The ASEAN Anthem is an expression of ASEAN unity. According to ASEAN, it also strengthens the sense of ASEAN identity and belonging among the peoples of the region. Thus specific guidelines were adopted at the 6th Meeting of the ASEAN Coordinating Council (ACC), Hanoi, 8 April 2010. The guidelines are subject to approval by the ASEAN Coordinating Council, with amendments proposed by member states and considered by the Committee of Permanent Representatives, ensuring a consensus-driven process for any changes. The guidelines emphasize the need for dignified and respectful treatment of the anthem, requiring audiences to rise when it is played. Prohibitions include the anthem's use for commercial or political propaganda. Encouraging its use at formal ASEAN meetings and related activities, as well as on special occasions, the guidelines also promote the translation of the anthem into local languages by member states to enhance awareness.

== See also ==
- Anthems of international organizations
