= Emblem of the African Union =

Official emblem of the African Union

Emblem of the African Union

The emblem of the African Union features a golden, boundary-less map of Africa inside two concentric circles, with stylised palm leaves shooting up on either side of the outer circle. The design was originally adopted as the emblem of the Organisation of African Unity (OAU) and was inherited by the African Union when it replaced the OAU as Africa's primary continental organisation in 2002.

== History ==
The Organisation of African Unity was established on 25 May 1963 in Addis Ababa, Ethiopia, as a pan-African intergovernmental body bringing together newly independent African states. The OAU adopted its flag and emblem in 1970, seven years after the organisation's founding. The designers deliberately omitted black from the emblem's colour palette, on the grounds that not all Africans are Black and that the emblem should avoid even the smallest suggestion of racial connotation.

The African Union was formally established on 9 July 2002, succeeding the OAU. When the new organisation was formed, a competition was announced for designing a new emblem and flag. The Assembly of the African Union nonetheless decided at its Third Ordinary Session, held 6–8 July 2004 in Addis Ababa, to retain the emblem and flag of its predecessor and adopt them as the official AU symbols.

In January 2010, at the Fourteenth Ordinary Session of the Assembly of Heads of State in Addis Ababa, the AU adopted a redesigned flag featuring a green field bearing a ring of gold stars representing member states, replacing the inherited OAU flag. The circular emblem was not replaced and continues to appear on official African Union documents and in institutional contexts.

== Symbolism ==
The palm leaves stand for peace. The gold circle symbolises Africa's wealth and bright future, while the green circle represents African hopes and aspirations for unity. The map of Africa, without boundaries, signifies African unity, while a series of small interlocking red rings at the base of the emblem stand for African solidarity and the blood shed for the liberation of Africa.

== See also ==
- Flag of the African Union
- Organisation of African Unity
