= Monrovia Group =

Organization

The Monrovia Group, sometimes known as the Monrovia bloc, officially the Conference of Independent African States, was a short-lived, informal association of African states with a shared vision of the future of Africa and of Pan-Africanism in the early 1960s. Its members believed that Africa's independent states should co-operate and exist in harmony, but without political federation and deep integration as supported by its main rival, the so-called Casablanca Group. In 1963, the two groups united to establish a formal, continent-wide organisation, the Organisation for African Unity.

The alliance first met on 8–12 May 1961 in Monrovia, the capital of Liberia, one of its leading countries. Other members included Nigeria and most of Francophone Africa, including Senegal and Cameroon. Their approach was more moderate and less radical than that of the Casablanca Group. Its leaders stressed the importance of Africa's newly independent states retaining their autonomy and strengthening their own bureaucracies, militaries and economies. They promoted nationalism, the creed that each nation of Africa should be self-governing, over Pan-Africanism, the belief that the whole continent should seek ever closer union and integration of their politics, society, economy and so on.

The Monrovia Group's ideas ultimately prevailed. In 1963, states from both groups joined to create the Organisation of African Unity (OAU). Its Charter places the principles of independent statehood, non-interference and national sovereignty at its heart. The OAU's pursuit of integration was minimal and its opposition to continental federation unequivocal. The OAU, like its successor the African Union (AU), is a reflection of the more nationalist values of the Monrovia Group and a repudiation of the more supra-national ideas of the Casablanca Group.

== See also ==
- African Union
- Casablanca Group
- Françafrique
- African and Malagasy Union
