= Students Movement of the African and Malagasy Common Organization =

Students Movement of the African and Malagasy Common Organization (in French: Mouvement des Etudiants de l'Organisation Commune Africaine et Malgache), generally called M.E.O.C.A.M., was an organization of African students in France. M.E.O.C.A.M. was founded of the initiative of Félix Houphouët-Boigny in November 1966, in order to counter the influence of the Federation of Students of Black Africa in France (F.E.A.N.F.). F.E.A.N.F. was seen by the Houphouët-Boigny regime as pro-communist and subversive.

The formation of M.E.O.C.A.M. provoked protests amongst students in Côte d'Ivoire. In early 1967 a group of over 100 students was arrested in connection with these protests.
