= Casablanca Group =

1960s association of African states

The Casablanca Group, sometimes known as the 'Casablanca bloc', was a short-lived, informal association of African states with a shared vision of the future of Africa and of Pan-Africanism in the early 1960s. The group was composed of seven states led by left-wing leaders — Algeria, Egypt, Ghana, Guinea, Libya, Mali, and Morocco. The conflict and eventual compromise between the Casablanca Group and the Monrovia Group led to the establishment of the Organisation of African Unity.

== History ==
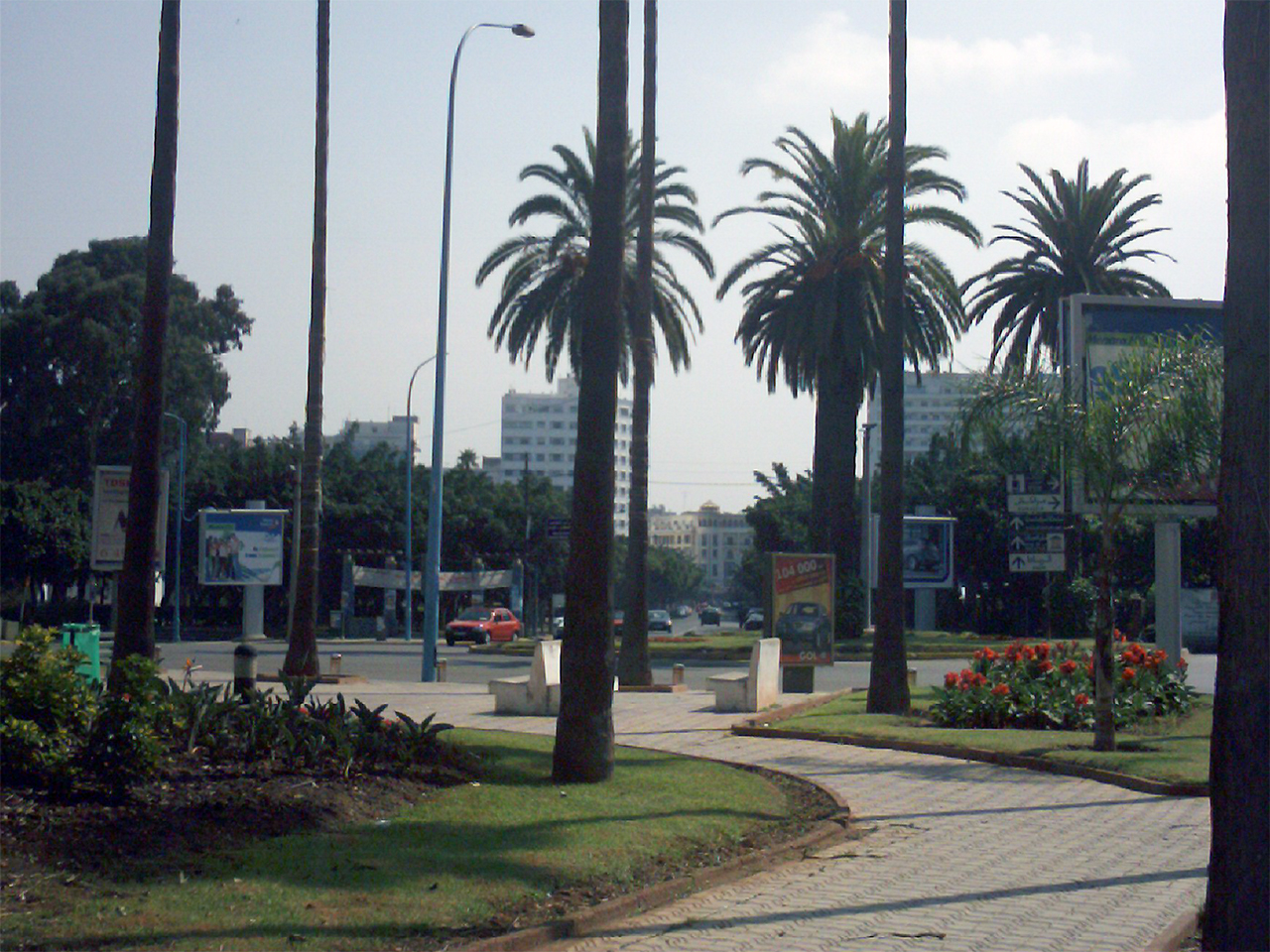
African Unity Square (Place de l'Unité Africaine) in Casablanca

The group first met in 1961 in the Moroccan port city of Casablanca, hence the alliance's name. This conference brought together some of the continent's most prominent statesmen like Gamal Abdel-Nasser of Egypt, Kwame Nkrumah of Ghana and Sékou Touré of Guinea.

What united them was a belief in the need for African political unification or federation. They believed that only significant, deep integration, as has since occurred in Europe through the European Union, would enable Africa to defeat colonialism, achieve peace, foster cultural dialogue, increase the continent's geopolitical influence and promote economic development. In other words, they believed in the transfer of many powers from national governments to a supranational, pan-African authority. Nkrumah even argued for the establishment of a pan-African army which could be deployed to fight colonialism or white minority rule across the continent. His famous Pan-Africanist slogan was 'Africa Must Unite!'

However, the Casablanca Group was ultimately unsuccessful. Most other African leaders did not support such radical change. The ideas of its rival, the so-called Monrovia Group—which also believed in Pan-Africanism but not at the expense of nationalism and independent statehood—prevailed. In 1963, the Organisation of African Unity (OAU) was established. All the members of both the Casablanca and Monrovia groups joined, putting their differences aside. The OAU, now the African Union, has only achieved limited integration and unity of its member states. It is a reflection of the values of the Monrovia Group and a repudiation of the ideas of the Casablanca Group.

As well as disagreeing on the nature of African unity, the groups also took up conflicting positions on the then conflicts in Algeria and Congo. While the Casablanca Group's members pledged to support the National Liberation Front in its efforts fighting for Algerian independence from France, the Monrovia Group backed their enemies, the French.

== See also ==
- African Union
