= Lev Oshanin (poet) =

Russian poet, playwright and writer (1912–1996)

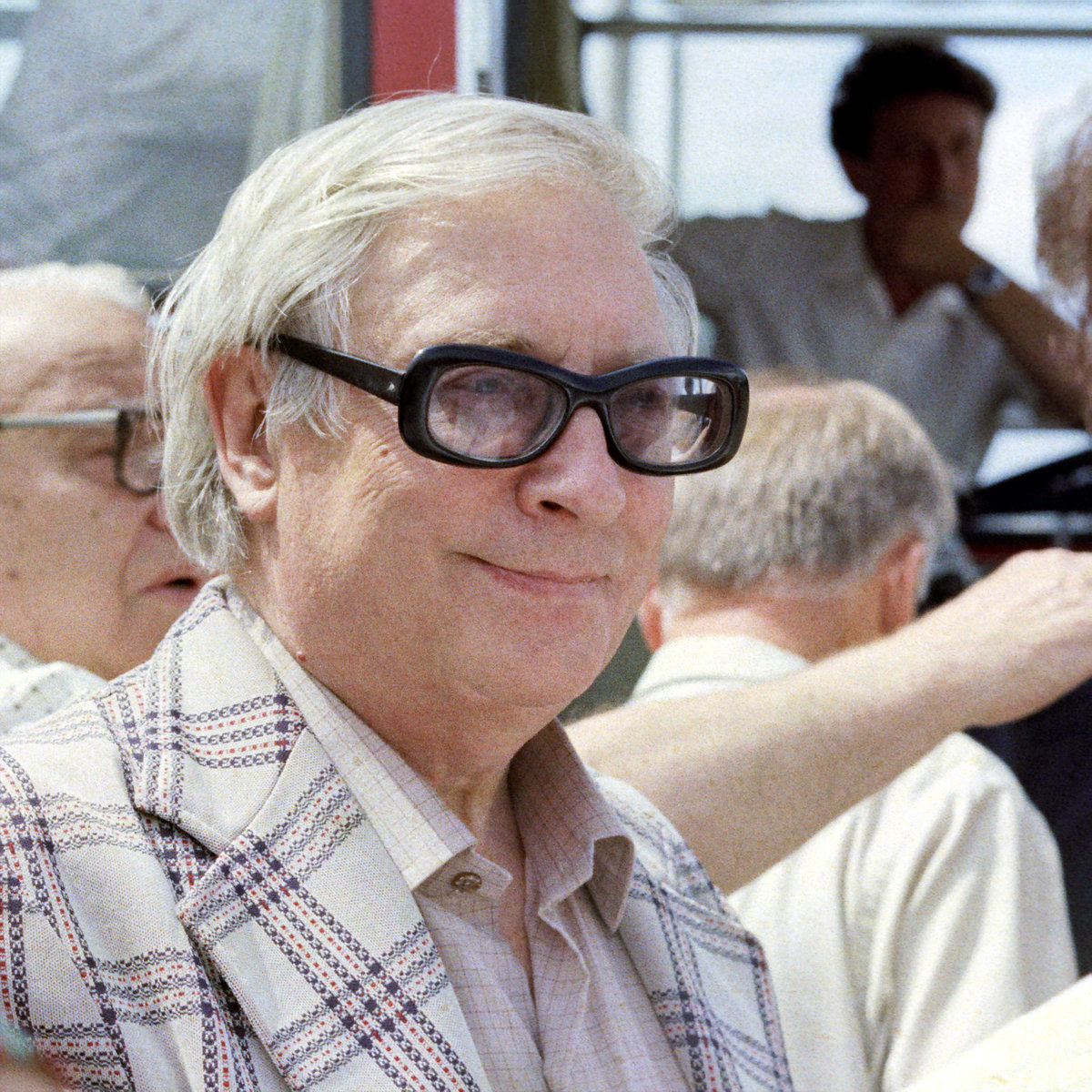
- Oshanin in 1981
- Born: Lev Ivanovich Oshanin; 30 May 1912; Rybinsk, Yaroslavl Governorate, Russian Empire
- Died: 30 December 1996 (aged 84); Moscow, Russia
- Resting place: Vagankovo Cemetery, Moscow

Signature
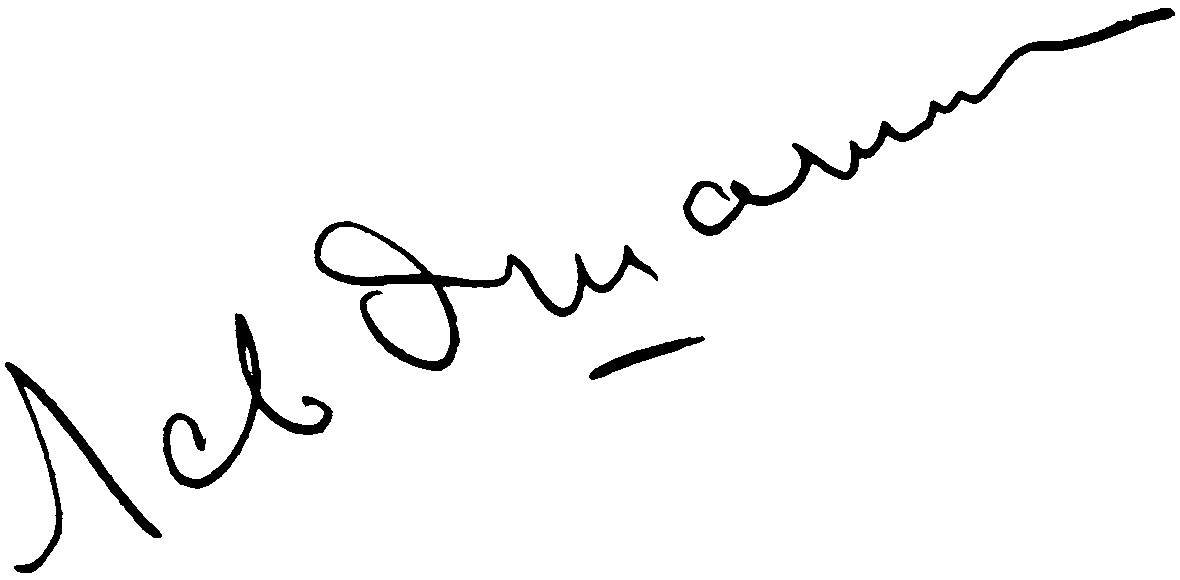

Lev Ivanovich Oshanin (Russian: Лев Ива́нович Оша́нин; 30 May 1912 – 30 December 1996) was a Soviet poet, songwriter, author of over 70 books of poetry, novels and poetry plays, winner of the Stalin Prize of the first degree (1950) and winner of the World Festival of Youth and Students.

== Creativity ==
Lev Oshanin is one of the most popular and officially recognized songwriters of the Soviet era, with many of his verses and poems being set to music and widely used by Soviet forces during WWII. The song “Roads" became popular; “Song of Troubled Youth” performed by Yuri Gulyaev, “The Volga River Flows ” performed by Vladimir Troshin and Lyudmila Zykina, and the cycle “And there is a girl in our yard alone” performed by Joseph Kobzon also gained enormous popularity and Maya Kristalinskaya, “Solar Circle” (“Let there always be sunshine”), “Why did you call me?”, “Oh, Natasha,” “People in white coats,” “I’m just working as a magician.” The song based on the verses “Sunny Circle” (composer - Arkady Ostrovsky), performed by Tamara Miansarova, won at the Polish song festival in Sopot in 1963.
