= Organisation of African Unity =

African international body (1963–2002)

Organisation of African Unity Organisation de l'unité africaine
- 1963–2002
- Flag Emblem
- Anthem: "Let Us All Unite and Celebrate Together"
- OAU during its foundation
- Capital: Addis Ababa
- Membership: 54 member states: Algeria; Angola; Benin; Botswana; Burkina Faso (previously Upper Volta); Burundi; Cameroon; Cape Verde; Central African Republic; Chad; Comoros; Democratic Republic of the Congo; Congo; Djibouti; Egypt; Equatorial Guinea; Eritrea; Ethiopia; Gabon; Gambia; Ghana; Guinea; Guinea-Bissau; Ivory Coast; Kenya; Lesotho; Liberia; Libya; Madagascar; Malawi; Mali; Mauritania; Mauritius; Morocco (withdrew); Mozambique; Namibia; Niger; Nigeria; Rwanda; Sahrawi Republic; São Tomé and Príncipe; Senegal; Seychelles; Sierra Leone; Somalia; South Africa; Sudan; Tanzania; Togo; Tunisia; Uganda; Zambia; Zimbabwe
- Secretary-general
  - 1963–1964: Kifle Wodajo
  - 1964–1972: Diallo Telli
  - 1972–1974: Nzo Ekangaki
  - 1974–1978: William Eteki
  - 1978–1983: Edem Kodjo
  - 1983–1985: Peter Onu
  - 1985–1989: Ide Oumarou
  - 1989–2001: Salim Ahmed Salim
  - 2001–2002: Amara Essy
- History
  - Charter: 25 May 1963
  - Disbanded: 9 July 2002
| Preceded by | Succeeded by |
| Casablanca Group; Monrovia Group | African Union |
- ^{a} Headquartered in Addis Ababa, Ethiopia

The Organisation of African Unity (OAU; French: Organisation de l'unité africaine, OUA) was an African intergovernmental organisation established on 25 May 1963 in Addis Ababa, Ethiopia, with 33 signatory governments. (Note: Due to the union of Tanganyika and Zanzibar into Tanzania about a year later, the 33 original signatories represent 32 modern states.) Some of the key aims of the OAU were to encourage political and economic integration among member states, and to eradicate colonialism and neo-colonialism from the African continent.

The absence of an armed force like the United Nations (UN) peacekeepers left the organization with no means to enforce its decisions. It was also unwilling to become involved in the internal affairs of member nations, prompting some critics to claim the OAU as ineffective in taking decisive action. Recognising this, in September 1999 the OAU issued the Sirte Declaration, calling for a new body to take its place. On 9 July 2002, the OAU's chairman, South African president Thabo Mbeki, formally dissolved the OAU and replaced it with the African Union (AU), its immediate successor, which upholds many of the founding principles of the OAU.

== History ==
The inception of the OAU's establishment was the Sanniquellie Pledge at the First West African Summit Conference held in Sanniquellie, Liberia, on 15–19 July 1959. President Tubman of Liberia hosted President Touré of Guinea, and Prime Minister Nkrumah of Ghana, and the three pledged to work together for the formation of a "Community of Independent African States".

The OAU was founded in May 1963 in Addis Ababa, Ethiopia, by 32 African states with the main aim of bringing the African nations together and resolve the issues within the continent. Its first ever conference was held on 1 May 1963 in Addis Ababa. At that conference, the late Gambian historian – and one of the leading Gambian nationalists and Pan-Africanists at the time – Alieu Ebrima Cham Joof delivered a speech in front of the member states, in which he said:

It is barely 75 years when the European Powers sat around the table in Germany each holding a dagger to carve up Africa for its own benefit.… Your success will inspire and speed up the freedom and total independence of the African continent and eradicate imperialism and colonialism from the continent and eventually neo-colonialism from the globe… Your failure, which no true African in Africa is praying for, will prolong our struggle with bitterness and disappointment. I, therefore, adjure that you ignore any suggestion outside Africa and holding that the present civilisation, which some of the big powered are boasting of, sprang up from Africa, and realising that the entire world has something earthly to learn from Africa, you would endeavour your utmost to come to agreement, save Africa from the clutches of neo-colonialism and resurrect African dignity, manhood and national stability.

== Aims ==
The OAU had the following primary aims:

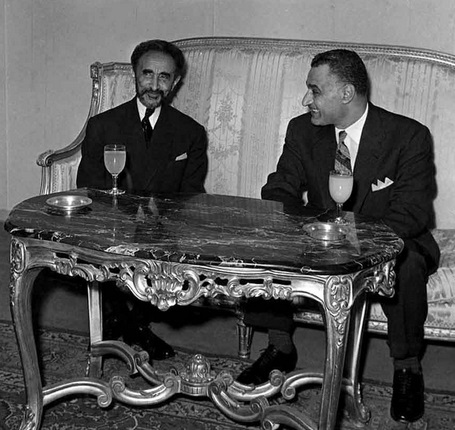
Emperor of Ethiopia Haile Selassie with President of Egypt Gamal Abdel Nasser in Addis Ababa for the Organisation of African Unity summit, 1963

- To co-ordinate and intensify the co-operation of African states in order to achieve a better life for the people of Africa.
- To defend the sovereignty, territorial integrity and independence of African states.
- The OAU was also dedicated to the eradication of all forms of colonialism and white minority rule as, when it was established, there were several states that had not yet won their independence or were white minority-ruled. South Africa and Angola were two such countries. The OAU proposed two ways of ridding the continent of colonialism and white minority rule. First, it would defend the interests of independent countries and help to pursue the independence those of still-colonised ones. Secondly, it would remain neutral in terms of world affairs, preventing its members from being controlled once more by outside powers.

A Liberation Committee was established to aid independence movements and look after the interests of already-independent states. The OAU also aimed to stay neutral in terms of global politics, which would prevent them from being controlled once more by outside forces – an especial danger with the Cold War.

The OAU had other aims, too:

- Ensure that all Africans enjoyed human rights.
- Raise the living standards of all Africans.
- Settle arguments and disputes between members – not through fighting but rather peaceful and diplomatic negotiation.

Soon after achieving independence, a number of African states expressed a growing desire for more unity within the continent. Not everyone was agreed on how this unity could be achieved, however, and two opinionated groups emerged in this respect:

- The Casablanca bloc, led by Kwame Nkrumah of Ghana, wanted a federation of all African countries. Aside from Ghana, it comprised also Algeria, Guinea, Morocco, Egypt, Mali and Libya. Founded in 1961, its members were described as "progressive states".
- The Monrovian bloc, led by Senghor of Senegal, felt that unity should be achieved gradually, through economic cooperation. It did not support the notion of a political federation. Its other members were Nigeria, Liberia, Ethiopia, and most of the former French colonies.

Some of the initial discussions took place at Sanniquellie, Liberia. The dispute was eventually resolved when Ethiopian emperor Haile Selassie I invited the two groups to Addis Ababa, where the OAU and its headquarters were subsequently established. The Charter of the Organisation was signed by 32 independent African states.

At the time of the OAU's disbanding, 53 out of the 54 African states were members; Morocco left on 12 November 1984 following the admission of the Sahrawi Arab Democratic Republic as the government of Western Sahara in 1982.

== Criticism and praise ==
The organisation was widely derided as a bureaucratic "talking shop" with little power. It struggled to enforce its decisions, and its lack of armed force made intervention exceedingly difficult. Civil wars in Nigeria and Angola continued unabated for years, and the OAU could do nothing to stop them.

The policy of non-interference in the affairs of member states also limited the effectiveness of the OAU. Thus, when human rights were violated, as in Uganda under Idi Amin in the 1970s, the OAU was powerless to stop them.

The Organisation was praised by Ghanaian former United Nations secretary-general Kofi Annan for bringing Africans together. Nevertheless, critics argue that, in its 39 years of existence, the OAU did little to protect the rights and liberties of African citizens from their own political leaders, often dubbing it as a "Dictators' Club" or "Dictators' Trade Union".

The OAU was, however, successful in some respects. Many of its members were members of the UN, too, and they stood together within the latter organisation to safeguard African interests – especially in respect of lingering colonialism. Its pursuit of African unity, therefore, was in some ways successful.

Total unity was difficult to achieve, however, as the OAU was largely divided. The former French colonies, still dependent on France, had formed the Monrovia Group, and there was a further split between those that supported the United States and those that supported the USSR in the Cold War of ideologies. The pro-socialist faction was led by Ghana's Kwame Nkrumah, while Félix Houphouët-Boigny of the Ivory Coast led the pro-capitalists. Because of these divisions, it was difficult for the OAU to take action against states involved in internal conflicts because it could rarely reach an agreement on what was to be done.

The OAU did play a pivotal role in eradicating colonialism and white minority rule in Africa. It gave weapons, training and military bases to rebel groups fighting white minority and colonial rule. Groups such as the ANC and PAC, fighting apartheid, and ZANU and ZAPU, fighting to topple the government of Rhodesia, were aided in their endeavours by the OAU. African harbours were closed to the South African government, and South African aircraft were prohibited from flying over the rest of the continent. The UN was convinced by the OAU to expel South Africa from bodies such as the World Health Organization.

The OAU also worked with the UN to ease refugee problems. It set up the African Development Bank for economic projects intended to make Africa financially stronger. Although all African countries eventually won their independence, it remained difficult for them to become totally independent of their former colonisers. There was often continued reliance on the former colonial powers for economic aid, which often came with strings attached: loans had to be paid back at high interest-rates, and goods had to be sold to the aiders at low rates.

The US and Soviet Union intervened in post-colonial Africa in pursuit of their own objectives. Help was sometimes provided in the form of technology and aid-workers. Despite the goodwill and best intentions, the OAU consistently failed at its stated goal - that of the fight to keep "Westerners" (colonialists) out of, and only focus upon, African affairs. The Organisation still heavily depended on Western help (military and economic) to intervene in African affairs, despite African leaders' displeasure at dealing with the international community, especially Western countries.

== Agencies ==
Autonomous specialised agencies, working under the auspices of the OAU, were:

- Pan-African Telecommunications Union (PATU)
- Pan-African Postal Union (PAPU)
- Pan-African News Agency (PANA)
- Union of African National Television and Radio Organisations (URTNA)
- Union of African Railways (UAR)
- Organisation of African Trade Union Unity (OATUU)
- Supreme Council for Sports in Africa
- African Civil Aviation Commission

== OAU summits ==
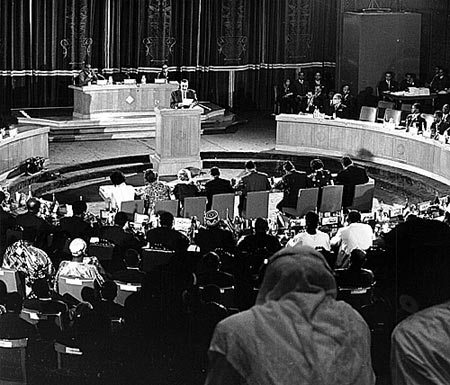
Egypt's president Nasser at the Cairo summit 1964

| Host city | Host country | Date |
|---|---|---|
| Addis Ababa | Ethiopia | 22–25 May 1963 |
| Cairo | Egypt | 17–21 July 1964 |
| Accra | Ghana | 21–26 October 1965 |
| Addis Ababa | Ethiopia | 5–9 November 1966 |
| Kinshasa | Democratic Republic of the Congo | 11–14 September 1967 |
| Algiers | Algeria | 13–16 September 1968 |
| Addis Ababa | Ethiopia | 6–10 September 1969 |
| Addis Ababa | Ethiopia | 1–3 September 1970 |
| Addis Ababa | Ethiopia | 21–23 June 1971 |
| Rabat | Morocco | 12–15 June 1972 |
| Addis Ababa | Ethiopia | 27–28 May 1973 |
| Mogadishu | Somalia | 1974 |
| Kampala | Uganda | 28 July–1 August 1975 |
| Port Louis | Mauritius | 2–6 July 1976 |
| Libreville | Gabon | 2–5 July 1977 |
| Khartoum | Sudan | 18–22 July 1978 |
| Monrovia | Liberia | 17–20 July 1979 |
| Freetown | Sierra Leone | 1–4 July 1980 |
| Nairobi | Kenya | 24–27 June 1981 |
| Addis Ababa | Ethiopia | 6–12 June 1983 |
| Addis Ababa | Ethiopia | 12–15 November 1984 |
| Addis Ababa | Ethiopia | 18–20 July 1985 |
| Addis Ababa | Ethiopia | 28–30 July 1986 |
| Addis Ababa | Ethiopia | 27–29 July- 1987 |
| Addis Ababa | Ethiopia | Extraordinary Summit: October 1987 |
| Addis Ababa | Ethiopia | 25–28 May 1988 |
| Addis Ababa | Ethiopia | 24–26 July 1989 |
| Addis Ababa | Ethiopia | 9–11 July 1990 |
| Abuja | Nigeria | 3–5 July 1991 |
| Dakar | Senegal | 29 June – 1 July 1992 |
| Cairo | Egypt | 28–30 June 1993 |
| Tunis | Tunisia | 13–15 June 1994 |
| Addis Ababa | Ethiopia | 26–28 June 1995 |
| Yaoundé | Cameroon | 8–10 June 1996 |
| Harare | Zimbabwe | 2–4 June 1997 |
| Ouagadougou | Burkina Faso | 8–10 June 1998 |
| Algiers | Algeria | 12–14 July 1999 |
| Sirte | Libya | Extraordinary Summit 6–9 September 1999 |
| Lomé | Togo | 10–12 July 2000 |
| Lusaka | Zambia | 9–11 July 2001, the last OAU summit |

== OAU members by date of admission (53 states) ==
| Date | Countries | Notes |
|---|---|---|
| 25 May 1963 | Algeria | |
| 25 May 1963 | Burundi | |
| 25 May 1963 | Cameroon | |
| 25 May 1963 | Central African Republic | |
| 25 May 1963 | Chad | |
| 25 May 1963 | Congo | |
| 25 May 1963 | DR Congo | 1971–97 Zaire |
| 25 May 1963 | Dahomey | From 1975 Benin |
| 25 May 1963 | Egypt | |
| 25 May 1963 | Ethiopia | |
| 25 May 1963 | Gabon | |
| 25 May 1963 | Ghana | |
| 25 May 1963 | Guinea | |
| 25 May 1963 | Ivory Coast | From 1985 Côte d'Ivoire |
| 25 May 1963 | Liberia | |
| 25 May 1963 | Libya | |
| 25 May 1963 | Madagascar | |
| 25 May 1963 | Mali | |
| 25 May 1963 | Mauritania | |
| 25 May 1963 | Morocco | Withdrew 12 November 1984, protesting the membership of Western Sahara. However, Morocco joined the African Union in January 2017, 33 years after its withdrawal. |
| 25 May 1963 | Niger | |
| 25 May 1963 | Nigeria | |
| 25 May 1963 | Rwanda | |
| 25 May 1963 | Senegal | |
| 25 May 1963 | Sierra Leone | |
| 25 May 1963 | Somalia | |
| 25 May 1963 | Sudan | |
| 25 May 1963 | Tanganyika | Tanganyika and Zanzibar merged 26 April 1964 to form the United Republic of Tanganyika and Zanzibar, which was renamed Tanzania on 1 November 1964. |
| 25 May 1963 | Togo | |
| 25 May 1963 | Tunisia | |
| 25 May 1963 | Uganda | |
| 25 May 1963 | Upper Volta | From 1984 Burkina Faso |
| 25 May 1963 | Zanzibar | Tanganyika and Zanzibar merged 26 April 1964 to form the United Republic of Tanganyika and Zanzibar, which was renamed Tanzania 1 November 1964. |
| 13 December 1963 | Kenya | |
| 13 July 1964 | Malawi | |
| 16 December 1964 | Zambia | |
| October 1965 | Gambia | |
| 31 October 1966 | Botswana | |
| 31 October 1966 | Lesotho | |
| August 1968 | Mauritius | |
| 24 September 1968 | Swaziland (now Eswatini) | |
| 12 October 1968 | Equatorial Guinea | |
| 19 November 1973 | Guinea-Bissau | |
| 11 February 1975 | Angola | |
| 18 July 1975 | Cape Verde | |
| 18 July 1975 | Comoros | |
| 18 July 1975 | Mozambique | |
| 18 July 1975 | São Tomé and Príncipe | |
| 29 June 1976 | Seychelles | |
| 27 June 1977 | Djibouti | |
| 1 June 1980 | Zimbabwe | |
| 22 February 1982 | Western Sahara | |
| 3 June 1990 | Namibia | |
| 24 May 1993 | Eritrea | |
| 6 June 1994 | South Africa | |

== See also ==
- African Parliamentary Union (APU), another inter-parliamentary institution only of some African countries (non-members are Eritrea, Seychelles, Comoros, Mauritius, Madagascar, Tanzania, Zimbabwe, Malawi, Mozambique, Botswana, South Africa, Swaziland, Lesotho, Sahrawi Republic)
- Africa Day
- Bamako Convention
- Casablanca Group
- Convention Governing the Specific Aspects of Refugee Problems in Africa
- List of Linguistic Rights in Constitutions (Africa)
- Monrovia Group
- MPAIAC
- Pan-Africanism
