= Emblems of the Soviet Republics =

USSR republics coat of arms display on USSR State Television, c. 1950s.

The emblems of the constituent republics of the Union of Soviet Socialist Republics all featured predominantly the hammer and sickle and the red star that symbolized communism, as well as a rising sun (although in the case of the Latvian SSR, since the Baltic Sea is west of Latvia, it could be interpreted as a setting sun), surrounded by a wreath of wheat (except the Estonian SSR and the Karelo-Finnish SSR with featured wreaths of rye). The USSR State motto, Workers of the world, unite!, in both the republic's language and Russian was also placed on each one of them. In addition to those repetitive motifs, emblems of many Soviet republics also included features that were characteristic of their local landscapes, economies or cultures.

The emblems are often called coats of arms, but since they (deliberately) did not follow the rules of heraldry, most of them cannot be considered coats of arms. However, they all did follow the same basic pattern, a pattern which sometimes has led to the use of the term "socialist heraldry".

By the dissolution of the Soviet Union on 26 December 1991, only Belarus, Estonia, Georgia, Latvia, Lithuania, and Moldova had adopted new official arms, while the other ones retained the Soviet emblems until new ones were adopted in the years following.

== Emblems of the Soviet Republics ==
The table below presents final versions of the renderings of the Soviet republics' emblems prior to the dissolution of the USSR in 1991, as well as the arms of two republics that ceased to exist before that time. For comparison, national arms of present-day successor states of the Soviet republics are also shown. As can be seen, most Central Asian post-Soviet republics use arms based on or reminiscent of the Soviet-era emblems, with Tajikistan and Uzbekistan have present-day arms nearly identical to the Soviet one. Most European republics, on the other hand, reverted to their traditional pre-Soviet heraldic arms. Belarus used the traditional Pahonia as its coat of arms from 1991 to 1995 when it was replaced by a new emblem closely resembling the Soviet-era design.

Republic	Emblem	Main article	Republic-specific features		Present-day national coat of arms
Russia		Emblem of the Russian SFSR	Plants	wheat	Coat of arms of Russia
Russia		Emblem of the Russian SFSR	Landscapes, geographic features		Coat of arms of Russia
Russia		Emblem of the Russian SFSR	Industry		Coat of arms of Russia
Russia		Emblem of the Russian SFSR	Ornaments	Baroque cartouche	Coat of arms of Russia
Ukraine		Emblem of the Ukrainian SSR	Plants	wheat	Coat of arms of Ukraine
Ukraine		Emblem of the Ukrainian SSR	Landscapes, geographic features		Coat of arms of Ukraine
Ukraine		Emblem of the Ukrainian SSR	Industry		Coat of arms of Ukraine
Ukraine		Emblem of the Ukrainian SSR	Ornaments	Baroque cartouche	Coat of arms of Ukraine
Byelorussia		Emblem of the Byelorussian SSR	Plants	wheat, clover, flax	Emblem of Belarus
Byelorussia		Emblem of the Byelorussian SSR	Landscapes, geographic features		Emblem of Belarus
Byelorussia		Emblem of the Byelorussian SSR	Industry		Emblem of Belarus
Byelorussia		Emblem of the Byelorussian SSR	Ornaments		Emblem of Belarus
Uzbekistan		Emblem of the Uzbek SSR	Plants	wheat, cotton	Emblem of Uzbekistan
Uzbekistan		Emblem of the Uzbek SSR	Landscapes, geographic features		Emblem of Uzbekistan
Uzbekistan		Emblem of the Uzbek SSR	Industry		Emblem of Uzbekistan
Uzbekistan		Emblem of the Uzbek SSR	Ornaments		Emblem of Uzbekistan
Kazakhstan		Emblem of the Kazakh SSR	Plant	wheat	Emblem of Kazakhstan
Kazakhstan		Emblem of the Kazakh SSR	Landscapes, geographic features		Emblem of Kazakhstan
Kazakhstan		Emblem of the Kazakh SSR	Industry		Emblem of Kazakhstan
Kazakhstan		Emblem of the Kazakh SSR	Ornaments		Emblem of Kazakhstan
Georgia		Emblem of the Georgian SSR	Plants	wheat, grapes	Coat of arms of Georgia
Georgia		Emblem of the Georgian SSR	Landscapes, geographic features	Caucasus Mountains	Coat of arms of Georgia
Georgia		Emblem of the Georgian SSR	Industry		Coat of arms of Georgia
Georgia		Emblem of the Georgian SSR	Ornaments	Georgian ornament with a seven-pointed star from the pre-1921 Georgian coat of arms	Coat of arms of Georgia
Azerbaijan		Emblem of the Azerbaijan SSR	Plants	wheat, cotton	Emblem of Azerbaijan
Azerbaijan		Emblem of the Azerbaijan SSR	Landscapes, geographic features	Sun rising on Caspian Sea	Emblem of Azerbaijan
Azerbaijan		Emblem of the Azerbaijan SSR	Industry	oil drilling rig	Emblem of Azerbaijan
Azerbaijan		Emblem of the Azerbaijan SSR	Ornaments		Emblem of Azerbaijan
Lithuania		Emblem of the Lithuanian SSR	Plants	wheat, oak	Coat of arms of Lithuania
Lithuania		Emblem of the Lithuanian SSR	Landscapes, geographic features		Coat of arms of Lithuania
Lithuania		Emblem of the Lithuanian SSR	Industry		Coat of arms of Lithuania
Lithuania		Emblem of the Lithuanian SSR	Ornaments		Coat of arms of Lithuania
Moldavia		Emblem of the Moldavian SSR	Plants	wheat, maize, pears, grapes	Coat of arms of Moldova
Moldavia		Emblem of the Moldavian SSR	Landscapes, geographic features		Coat of arms of Moldova
Moldavia		Emblem of the Moldavian SSR	Industry		Coat of arms of Moldova
Moldavia		Emblem of the Moldavian SSR	Ornaments		Coat of arms of Moldova
Latvia		Emblem of the Latvian SSR	Plants	wheat	Coat of arms of Latvia
Latvia		Emblem of the Latvian SSR	Landscapes, geographic features	Baltic Sea	Coat of arms of Latvia
Latvia		Emblem of the Latvian SSR	Industry		Coat of arms of Latvia
Latvia		Emblem of the Latvian SSR	Ornaments		Coat of arms of Latvia
Kirghizia		Emblem of the Kirghiz SSR	Plants	wheat, cotton	Emblem of Kyrgyzstan
Kirghizia		Emblem of the Kirghiz SSR	Landscapes, geographic features	Tian Shan Mountains	Emblem of Kyrgyzstan
Kirghizia		Emblem of the Kirghiz SSR	Industry		Emblem of Kyrgyzstan
Kirghizia		Emblem of the Kirghiz SSR	Ornaments	Kyrgyz embroidery	Emblem of Kyrgyzstan
Tajikistan		Emblem of the Tajik SSR	Plants	wheat, cotton	Emblem of Tajikistan
Tajikistan		Emblem of the Tajik SSR	Landscapes, geographic features		Emblem of Tajikistan
Tajikistan		Emblem of the Tajik SSR	Industry		Emblem of Tajikistan
Tajikistan		Emblem of the Tajik SSR	Ornaments		Emblem of Tajikistan
Armenia		Emblem of the Armenian SSR	Plants	wheat, grapes	Coat of arms of Armenia
Armenia		Emblem of the Armenian SSR	Landscapes, geographic features	Mount Ararat	Coat of arms of Armenia
Armenia		Emblem of the Armenian SSR	Industry		Coat of arms of Armenia
Armenia		Emblem of the Armenian SSR	Ornaments		Coat of arms of Armenia
Turkmenia		Emblem of the Turkmen SSR	Plants	wheat, cotton, grapes	Emblem of Turkmenistan
Turkmenia		Emblem of the Turkmen SSR	Landscapes, geographic features	Turkmen landscape	Emblem of Turkmenistan
Turkmenia		Emblem of the Turkmen SSR	Industry	oil drilling rig	Emblem of Turkmenistan
Turkmenia		Emblem of the Turkmen SSR	Ornaments	gillam detail from a Turkmen rug	Emblem of Turkmenistan
Estonia		Emblem of the Estonian SSR	Plants	rye, pine, spruce	Coat of arms of Estonia
Estonia		Emblem of the Estonian SSR	Landscapes, geographic features		Coat of arms of Estonia
Estonia		Emblem of the Estonian SSR	Industry		Coat of arms of Estonia
Estonia		Emblem of the Estonian SSR	Ornaments		Coat of arms of Estonia
Republics that dissolved before 1991
Karelo-Finnish SSR (1940–1956)		Coat of arms of the Karelo-Finnish SSR	Plants	rye, pine	Coat of arms of Karelia (constituent entity of Russia)
Karelo-Finnish SSR (1940–1956)		Coat of arms of the Karelo-Finnish SSR	Landscapes, geographic features	Karelian landscape	Coat of arms of Karelia (constituent entity of Russia)
Karelo-Finnish SSR (1940–1956)		Coat of arms of the Karelo-Finnish SSR	Industry		Coat of arms of Karelia (constituent entity of Russia)
Karelo-Finnish SSR (1940–1956)		Coat of arms of the Karelo-Finnish SSR	Ornaments	Karelian embroidery	Coat of arms of Karelia (constituent entity of Russia)
Transcaucasian SFSR (1922–1936)		Emblem of the Transcaucasian SFSR	Plants	Wheat, cotton, maize, rice, grapes	
Transcaucasian SFSR (1922–1936)		Emblem of the Transcaucasian SFSR	Landscapes, geographic features	Caucasus mountains	
Transcaucasian SFSR (1922–1936)		Emblem of the Transcaucasian SFSR	Industry	Factory, oil drilling rigs	
Transcaucasian SFSR (1922–1936)		Emblem of the Transcaucasian SFSR	Ornaments		

== Derived designs ==
The secessionist Pridnestrovian Moldavian Republic (Transnistria), internationally recognised as part of Moldova, uses an emblem based on the emblem of the Moldavian SSR.

Emblem of the self-proclaimed Pridnestrovian Moldavian Republic

Emblem of the Russian Federation (1992–1993)

== See also ==
- Communist symbolism
- State Emblem of the Soviet Union
- Emblems of the Autonomous Soviet Republics
- Flags of the Soviet Republics
- List of coats of arms of the Russian Federation
- Emblems of the Yugoslav Socialist Republics
