= Emblem of the Transcaucasian Socialist Federative Soviet Republic =

- Armiger: Transcaucasian Socialist Federative Soviet Republic
- Adopted: 1923
- Relinquished: 1936
- Shield: Baroque shield with hammer and sickle
- Motto: Пролетарии всех стран, соединяйтесь! (Workers of the world, unite!)
- Other elements: Red star, rising sun, Caucasus Mountains backdrop, factory, oil drilling rigs, wheat, cotton, maize, rice, grapes
- Earlier version

The Emblem of the Transcaucasian SFSR was adopted by the government of the Transcaucasian SFSR. The final version was adopted in 1930.

The emblem is based loosely on the state emblem of the Soviet Union. It incorporates designs from each of the three major groups that combined in the Transcaucasian SFSR, the Armenians, Azeri and Georgians, and unusually features Islamic art and communist elements side by side. The latticework in the star itself bespeaks the former coat of arms of Georgia from 1918 to 1921 and adopted again from 1991 to 2004; the crescent represents the Muslim Azeris, on a background depicting the national symbol of the Armenians, Mount Ararat. The rising sun stands for the future, the star as well as the hammer and sickle for the victory of communism and the "world-wide socialist community of states".

In 1936, the republic was dissolved and the three regions became the Georgian, Armenian, and Azerbaijan SSR respectively.

== See also ==
- Emblem of the Armenian SSR
- Emblem of the Azerbaijan SSR
- Emblem of the Georgian SSR
- Flag of the Transcaucasian SFSR
