= Flag of Georgia =

Flag of Georgia may refer to:

- Flag of Georgia (country)
  - Flag of the Georgian Soviet Socialist Republic
- Flag of Georgia (U.S. state)
