= Flag of Georgia (country) =

Georgia
- Five Cross Flag
- Use: National flag, civil and state ensign
- Proportion: 2:3
- Adopted: 12th century (five cross flag); 14 January 2004; 22 years ago (current design)
- Design: A white field with a centred red cross; a red Bolnur-Katskhuri cross centres each quarter.
- Use: Presidential Standard
- Proportion: 1:1

The flag of Georgia (Georgian: საქართველოს სახელმწიფო დროშა, romanized: sakartvelos sakhelmts'ipo drosha), also known as the Five-Cross Flag (ხუთჯვრიანი დროშა, khutjvriani drosha), is one of the national symbols of Georgia. Originally a banner of the medieval Kingdom of Georgia, it was repopularised in the late 20th and early 21st centuries during the Georgian national revival, and officially reinstated as the nation's flag in 2004.

== History ==
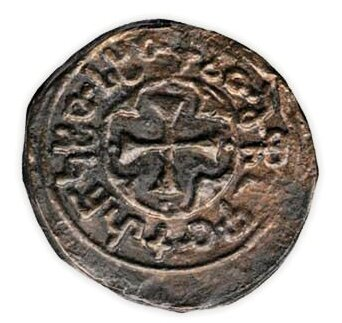
12th century coin of David IV, featuring the distinctive cross that forms part of the Georgian flag. Held at the British Museum.

The current flag was used by the Georgian patriotic movement following the country's independence from the Soviet Union in 1991. By the late 1990s, the design had become widely known as the Georgian historical national flag, as vexillologists had pointed out the red-on-white Jerusalem cross shown as the flag of Kingdom of Georgia in a 14th-century map by Domenico and Francesco Pizzigano.

A majority of Georgians, including the influential Catholicos-Patriarch of the Georgian Orthodox Church, supported the restoration of the flag and in 1999 the Parliament of Georgia passed a bill to change the flag. However, it was not endorsed by the then-President Eduard Shevardnadze. It was adopted in the early 2000s by the main opposition party, the United National Movement led by Mikheil Saakashvili, as a symbol of popular resistance to Shevardnadze's rule as well as a symbol of the Rose Revolution.

The flag was adopted by Parliament on 14 January 2004. Saakashvili formally endorsed it via Presidential Decree No. 31 signed on 25 January, following his election as president. 14 January is annually marked as a Flag Day in Georgia.

In 2021, a coin was discovered, minted during the reign of King David IV. According to Georgia's State Council of Heraldry, the engraving on its reverse side displays a "folded five-cross composition" and thus is an unmistakable historical connection of the design of the Georgian national flag with King David IV.

== Design ==
The five crosses on the current Georgian flag are sometimes interpreted as representing either the Five Holy Wounds, or alternatively Christ and the Four Evangelists. The national flag of Georgia, as described in the decree:

The Georgian national flag is a white rectangle, with a large red cross in its central portion touching all four sides of the flag. In the four corners there are four bolnur-katskhuri crosses (also referred to as a Georgian Cross or a Grapevine cross) of the same color as the large cross.

| Scheme | Red | White |
|---|---|---|
| RGB | 255-0-0 | 255-255-255 |
| CMYK | 0-100-100-0 | 0-0-0-0 |
| Pantone | 485 C | Safe |
| Web | #FF0000 | #FFFFFF |

Flag construction sheet

=== Military flags ===
Military units and authorities use their own flags and standards:

Flag of the Georgian Armed Forces

Flag of the Georgian Coast Guard

Standard of the Minister of Defence

Standard of the Chief of General Staff

== Previous flags ==
=== Early Georgian states ===
Purported flag of the Kingdom of Iberia after Christianization of the monarchy

The first Georgian flag design came about during the era of the early Georgian state, the Principality of Iberia which had a red cross against a white background, similar to the flag of England. The subsequent Kingdom of Tao-Klarjeti shared this same flag.

=== Medieval Georgian flags ===
Flag of David IV, adopted during his rule

Flag of Queen Tamar, adopted during her rule

Flag of the Kingdom of Georgia

Another flag seen for the Kingdom of Georgia (1008–1490)

The white flag with the single red Saint George's Cross was supposedly used by King Vakhtang I in the 5th century. According to tradition, Queen Tamar (d. 1213) used a flag with a dark red cross and a star in a white field. In the 1367 map by Domenico and Francesco Pizzigano, the flag of Tifilis (Tbilisi) is shown as a Jerusalem cross (a large cross with smaller crosses in each quarter). According to D. Kldiashvili (1997), the Jerusalem cross might have been adopted during the reign of King George V.

=== After the collapse of the Kingdom of Georgia ===
Flag of the Principality of Mingrelia in the 1550s

Flag of the Principality of Mingrelia in the 1560s

Flag of the Principality of Mingrelia in the 18th century

Flag of the Samtskhe-Saatabago

Flag of the Kingdom of Kakheti in the 18th century

Flag of the Kingdom of Imereti

=== Democratic Republic of Georgia (1918–1921) ===
Flag of the Democratic Republic of Georgia (1918–1921)

During Georgia's brief existence as an independent state as the Democratic Republic of Georgia from 1918 to 1921, a flag consisting of a dark red field with black and white bands in the canton was adopted. The design resulted from a national flag-designing contest won by the painter Iakob Nikoladze. It was abolished by the Soviet Union following the 1921 incorporation of Georgia into the USSR. After the collapse of the USSR, Georgia adopted a modified version with the length extended (see below).

=== Georgian Soviet Socialist Republic (1921–1991) ===
Flag of the Georgian SSR (1921–1922)

Flag of the Georgian SSR (1922–1937)

Flag of the Georgian SSR (1937–1951)

Flag of the Georgian SSR (1951–1990)

During the Soviet period, Georgia adopted several variants of the red Soviet flag incorporating first the Georgian Soviet Socialist Republic's name, and later a red hammer and sickle with a star in a blue sun in the canton and a blue bar in the upper part of flag. The flag of the Georgian SSR was replaced by the flag of the Democratic Republic of Georgia by the Georgian government in November 1990, shortly before it declared independence from the Soviet Union.

=== Georgia (1991–2004) ===
Flag of the Georgian SSR (as the Republic of Georgia, 1990–1991) and Georgia (1991–2004)

The previous flag used by the Democratic Republic of Georgia from 1918 to 1921 was reestablished as the flag of the Republic of Georgia on 8 December 1991, by the Supreme Council of the Republic of Georgia. However, it lost popularity thereafter as it became associated with the chaotic and violent period after the collapse of the Soviet Union. The wine-red colour symbolises the good times of the past as well as the future, whilst the black represents Russian rule, and the white represents hope for peace. This flag was later replaced by the current Georgian flag following the bloodless Rose Revolution. The flag is still used by supporters of former president of Georgia, Zviad Gamsakhurdia.

=== Gallery ===
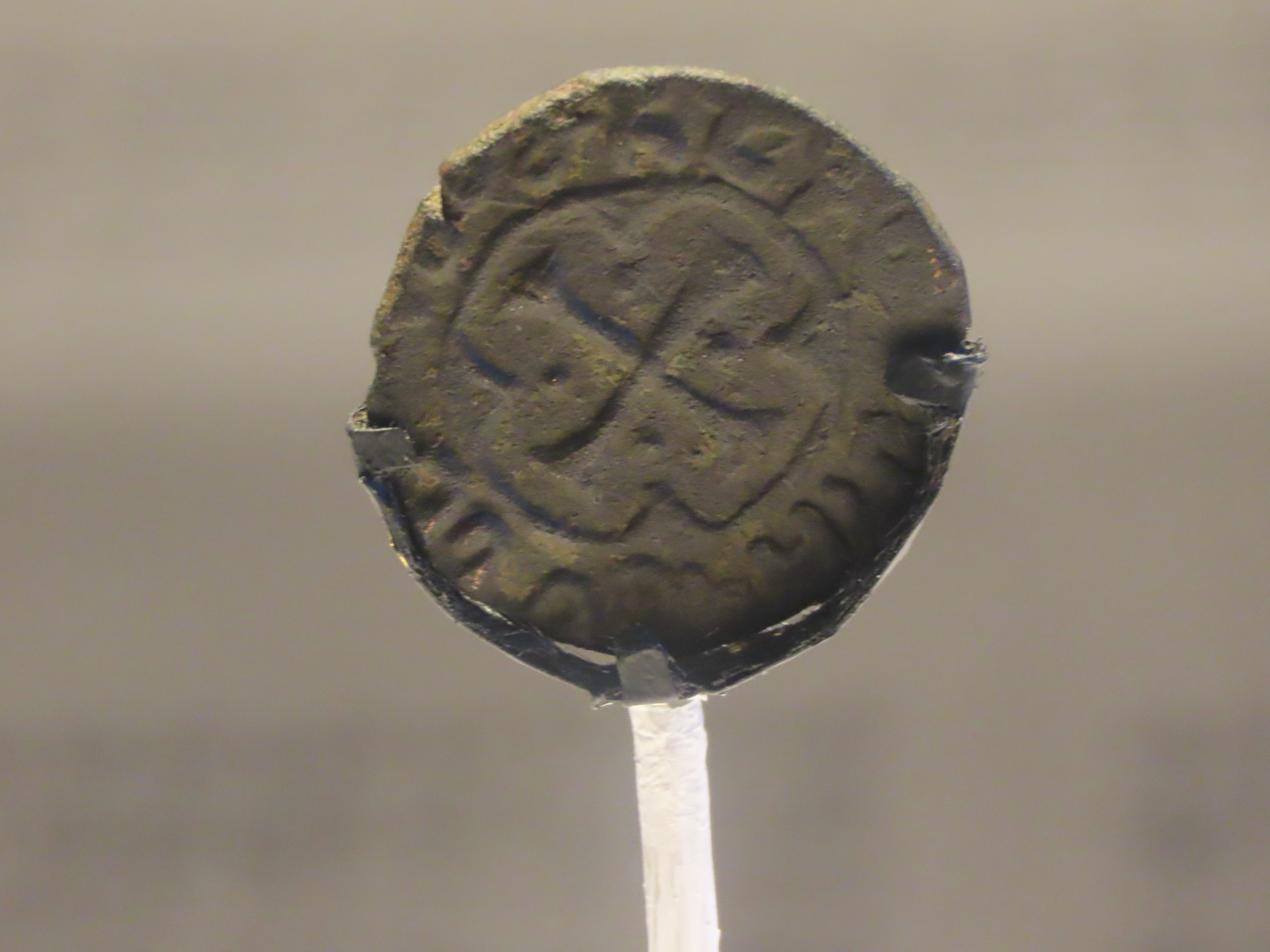
A copper coin of King David IV of Georgia

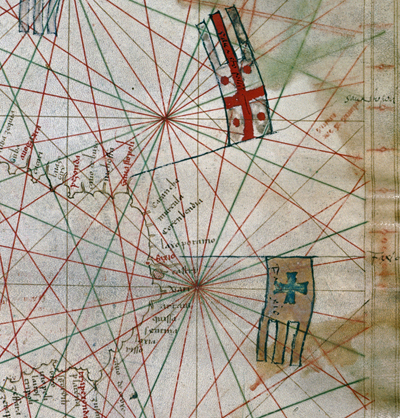
Detail from the 1321 nautical chart by Pietro Vesconte

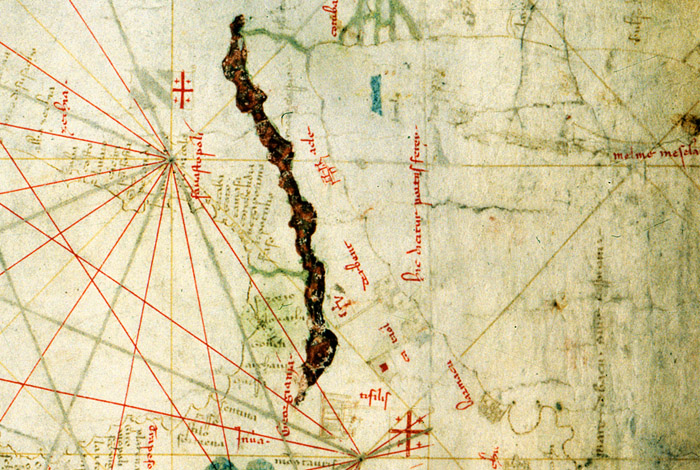
Detail from the 1339 Dulcert chart, showing Georgia and its flag

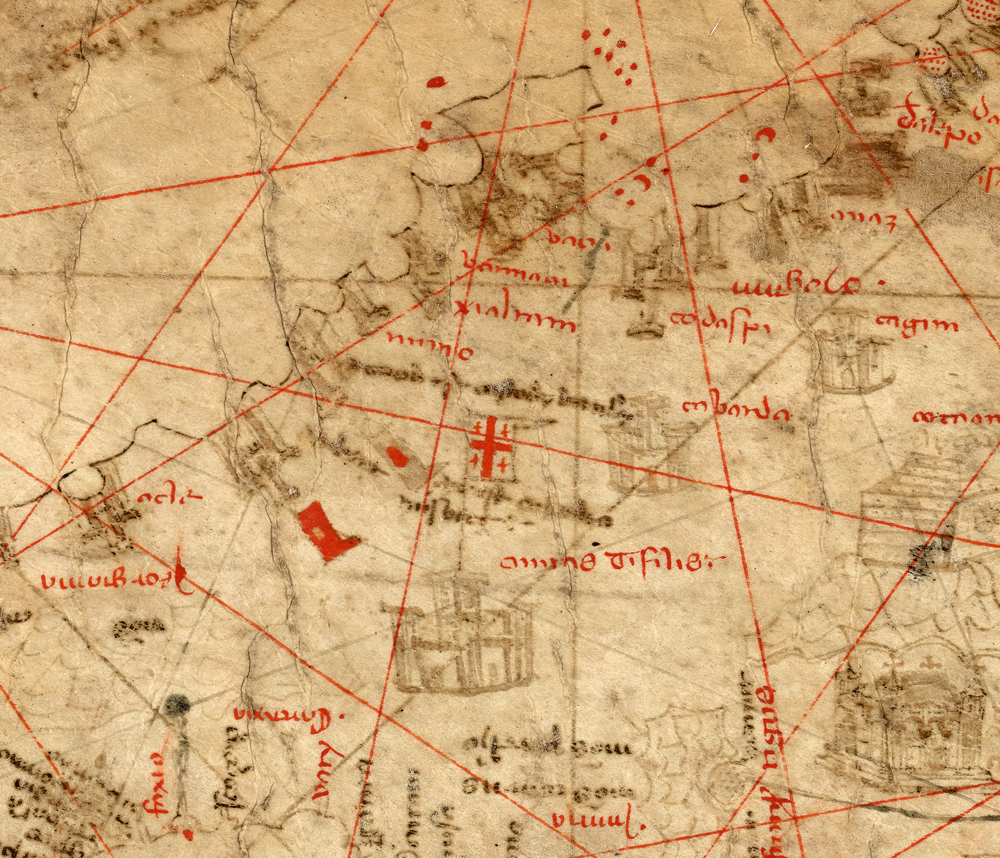
Detail from the 1367 Pizzigano chart, showing the five-cross flag over Tbilisi

== See also ==
- Flag of the Georgian Soviet Socialist Republic
- Coat of arms of Georgia (country)
- Flag of Abkhazia
- Flag of Adjara
- Flag of South Ossetia
- Flag of England
