= Flag of the Georgian Soviet Socialist Republic =

Georgian Soviet Socialist Republic
- Use: Civil and state flag, civil and state ensign
- Proportion: 1:2
- Adopted: 11 April 1951
- Relinquished: 1 November 1990
- Design: A plain red flag with the red hammer and sickle with a red star in a blue sun in canton, blue bar in upper part of flag.
- Designed by: Severian Maysashvili Davidovich
- Reverse flag
- Use: Civil and state flag, civil and state ensign
- Flag of the Georgian SSR (1990–1991) and Georgia (1991–)
- Use: National flag, civil and state ensign
- Proportion: 3:5
- Adopted: 1 November 1990
- Relinquished: 14 January 2004
- Design: A crimson flag with a horizontal bicolor of black and white in the canton corner.

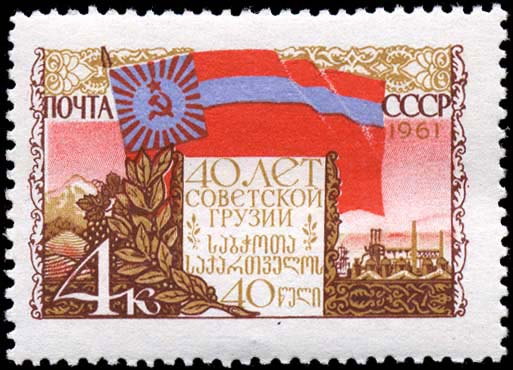
The Georgian SSR flag on a 1961 stamp

The flag of the Georgian Soviet Socialist Republic was adopted by the Georgian SSR on 11 April 1951.

The national flag of the Georgian Soviet Socialist Republic is of red cloth ratio of width to length is 1:2 In the upper corner near the staff box blue, the side of which is half the width of the flag in the middle of the square a circle whose radius is equal to one-third of the square in. range of hammer and sickle, above them a five-pointed star. From the circle to the square sides disagree 24 beam. the hammer and sickle, red star and red rays. From the middle of the right side of the square departs the band of blue across the flag length, width one-third of the square"

It was the only Union Republic flag in which the hammer and sickle was not gold in colour, instead being red.

== History ==
Before 1937, the flag was red with the Georgian characters სსსრ (SSSR) in gold in the top-left corner.

Between 1922 and 1937, the flag was red, with the Cyrillic characters ССРГ (SSRG) in the top left-hand corner.

Between 1937 and the adoption of the above flag in the 1940s, the flag was red, with the Georgian characters საქართველოს სსრ (Sakartvelos SSR) in gold in the top-left corner.

The 1951 flag fell into disuse in November 1990 when the flag based on the Democratic Republic of Georgia was introduced until the dissolution of the Soviet Union, which was replaced again in 2004 by the current flag.

Flag from 1921 to 1922

Flag from 1922 to 1937

Flag from 1937 to 1951

Flag from 1951 to 1990

Flag from 1990 to 1991

== See also ==
- Flag of the Soviet Union
- Coat of arms of the Georgian SSR
- Flag of Georgia
