= State Emblem of the Soviet Union =

State Emblem of the Union of Soviet Socialist Republics
- Armiger: Union of Soviet Socialist Republics
- Adopted: 6 July 1923 (original); 12 September 1956 (last version)
- Relinquished: 26 December 1991
- Motto: Workers of the world, unite!
- Earlier version: 1923, 1931, 1936, 1946

The State Emblem of the Soviet Union (Note: Russian: Государственный герб Советского Союза, IPA: [ɡəsʊˈdarstvʲɪn(ː)ɨj ɡʲerp sɐˈvʲetskəvə sɐˈjuzə]; Ukrainian: Державний герб СРСР; Belarusian: Дзяржаўны герб СССР; Kazakh: ССРО мемлекеттік елтаңбасы; Kyrgyz: ССРС мамлекеттик герби; Lithuanian: TSRS Valstybinis herbas; Latvian: PSRS valsts ģerbonis; Estonian: NSVL riigivapp) was the official symbol of the Union of Soviet Socialist Republics adopted in 1923 and used until the dissolution of the state in 1991.

In Russian, it is classified as a герб (gerb), the word used for a coat of arms. However, in Western heraldic rules, it is technically an emblem, as it does not follow the specific rules for coats of arms; nevertheless, it was intended as equivalent in prestige.

The coat of arms was recorded in Article 143 of the 1936 Constitution of the USSR. The emblem contains an image of a hammer and sickle on the background of the terrestrial globe, in the rays of the sun and surrounded by ears of grain (wheat), in a red ribbon with the inscription in the languages of the union republics "Proletarians of all countries, unite!" In the upper part of the coat of arms is a five-pointed red star with a yellow border.

It was the first (apart from the earlier created emblems of the constituent republics) state insignia created in the style known as socialist heraldry, a style also seen in emblems of other socialist countries such as East Germany and the People's Republic of China.

== History ==
=== Creation ===
Comintern Logo

In the autumn of 1922, the Commission for the Development of Soviet Symbolics began its work in Goznak. In those days, compositions of the first Soviet brands and banknotes were created. On 10 January 1923, the Presidium of the Central Executive Committee of the USSR established a commission for the development of the state emblem and flag. At the same time, the CEC defined the main elements of the state symbols of the union: the sun, the sickle and hammer, the motto "Proletarians of all countries, unite!".

In February 1923, the order for the creation of the coat of arms was handed over to Goznak. The artists of Goznak presented their variants, sketches of the projects of the coat of arms of artists Dmitry S. Golyadkin, Yakov B. Dreyer, Nikolai N. Kochura, Vladimir D. Kupriyanov, P. Rumyantsev, Alexander Georgievich Yakimchenko, Ivan Shadr. An interesting project was presented by artist K.I. Dunin-Borkovsky - he, as an adherent of classical heraldry, represented the coat of arms of the USSR as a heraldic shield with a sickle and a hammer.

The Commission outlined several key principles that should form the basis of the new symbol:

- the unity of workers and peasants,
- the reflection of the international nature of the state in the coat of arms,
- the readiness of the USSR for voluntary expansion,
- the motto "Proletarians of all countries, unite!"

==== Rejected proposals ====
Projects by Goznak artists:
Casimir Dunin-Borkowski	Alexander Georgievich Yakimchenko	Alexander Georgievich Yakimchenko	Yakov B. Dreyer
Dmitry S. Golyadkin	Nikolai N. Kochura	Vladimir D. Kupriyanov	

All of Goznak's sketches rejected the conservative layout of European heraldry, especially shields. The designs refer to the poster tradition of the early 1920s. In February, the commission did not accept any of the sketches by Goznak's staff artists.

==== Successful proposals ====
Projects by Vasily P. Korzun:
Pentagonal design	Drawing with a monogram	Drawing with a star

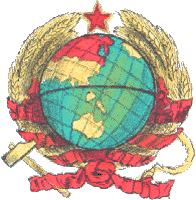
Drawing of an anonymous project

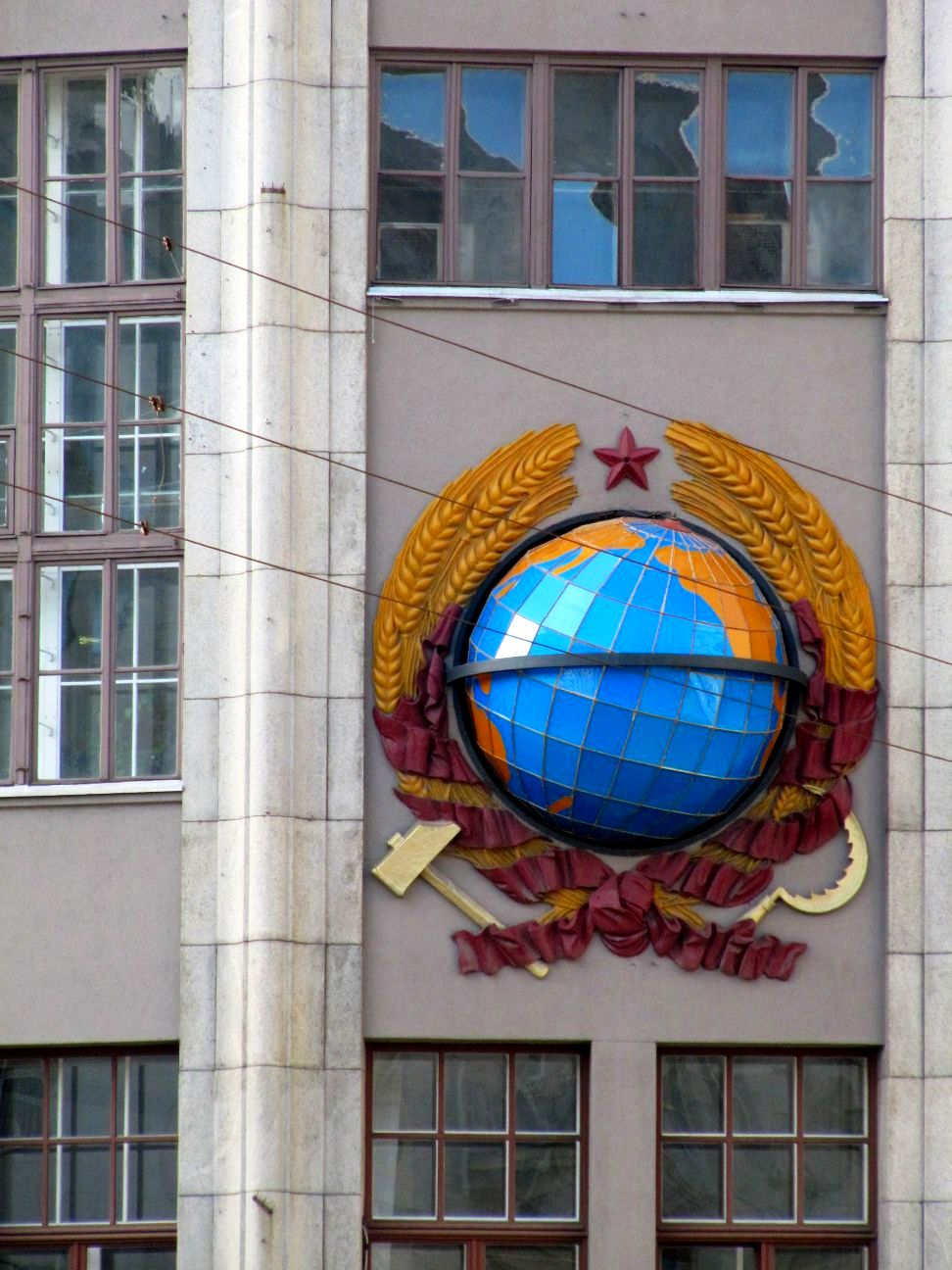
Photo (after renovation in 2010)

The artist whose sketches interested the commission was Vasily Korzun. He did not work at Goznak, but it was Korzun's idea that became the basis of the emblem. On the basis of the order, the artist prepared several projects based on the idea of "a hammer and sickle hovering over the globe". The idea of placing a globe on the emblem was originally proposed by cartographer Vladimir Adrianov. The globe was to symbolize that access to the Union was open to all states of the world. These were the last drawings, which became the basis of the Soviet emblem, but it was not without modifications. The commission invited the young artist Ivan Dubasov to participate in the work. In general, the entire composition of the emblem was developed by Adrianov and Korzun. Work on the draft of the coat of arms was monitored by government authorities. For example, the Secretary of the Presidium of the Central Executive Committee Avel Yenukidze on 28 June 1923 proposed to place a red star at the top of the emblem in place of the monogram "USSR" ("СССР"). His remark: "Instead of a monogram, a star" was immortalized in Korzun's archival drawing. One of the early designs by an unknown author can be seen on the Central Telegraph building in Moscow, opened in 1927.

==== Approval ====
Versions valid in the years:
Dubasov's first drawing

The design of the successful proposed emblem was redrawn by Ivan Dubasov. In his first draft, slogans were placed on a red ribbon covering the lower part of the coat of arms. Then it was decided to place mottos in 6 languages on the tape interceptions.

=== First version (1923–1936) ===
Versions valid in the years:
1923–1931 (6 languages)	1931–1936 (7 languages)

The project of the first version of the state emblem was accepted on 6 July 1923 by the 2nd session of the Central Executive Committee (CIK) and the version was completed on 22 September of that year. This design was fixed in Article 70 of the 1924 Soviet Constitution: "The State Emblem of the USSR is composed of a sickle and a hammer on a globe depicted in the rays of the sun and framed by ears of wheat, with the inscription 'proletarians of the world, unite!' in six languages mentioned in Article 34. At the top of the Emblem is a five-pointed star." The six languages were Russian, Ukrainian, Belarusian, Georgian, Armenian, and "Turko-Tatar", which originally represented Azerbaijani and later also covered Uzbek SSR and Turkmen SSR.

After the constitution was amended on March 17, 1931, Article 70 simply mentioned "the languages commonly used in the union republics", and the design was updated in the same year. Tajik in the Persian alphabet was added after the formation of the Tajik SSR in 1929. From now on, the Russian inscription came to be in the center. At the same time, as a result of language reforms, the Turkic inscription began to be written in the Latin alphabet.

=== Second version (1936–1946) ===
Versions valid in the years:
1936–1946
(11 languages)

With the ratification of the 1936 Soviet Constitution, the USSR consisted of eleven republics, and the design of the state emblem was specified under Article 143 with the inscription "in the languages of the union republics". As a result, the new version had eleven ribbons bearing USSR State Motto inscriptions in eleven languages. The languages added were Kazakh, Kyrgyz, Turkmen, and Uzbek. Additionally, Tajik began to be written in the Latin alphabet.

=== Third version (1946–1956) ===
Versions valid in the years:
1946–1956
(16 languages)

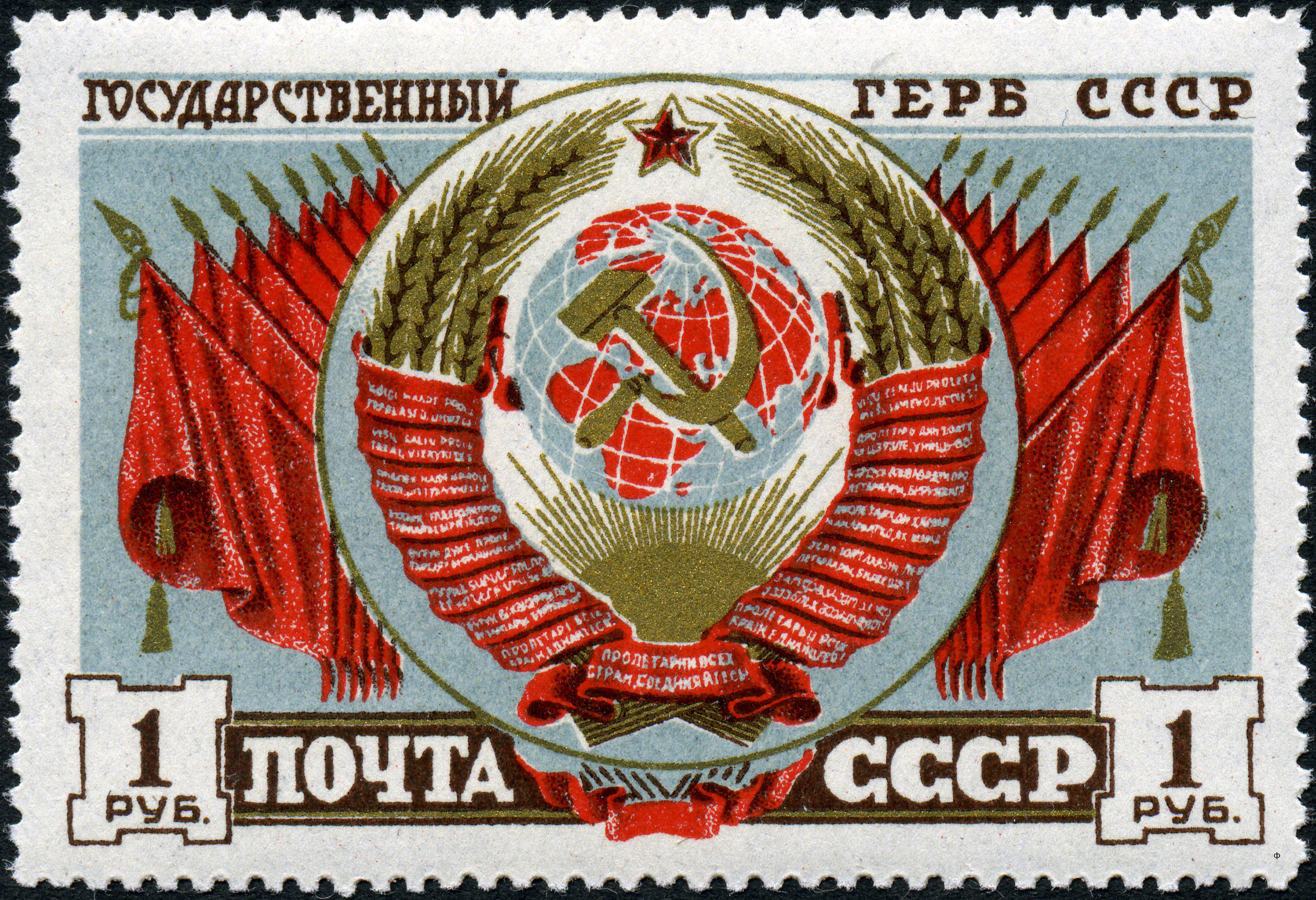
The 1946 version on a Soviet postage stamp

The Soviet Union joined World War II by invading Poland and Finland and occupying the Baltic states in 1939–40. The majority of the territories that Finland had to cede after the Winter War were combined with the Karelian Autonomous Soviet Socialist Republic of the Russian SFSR into the "independent" Karelo-Finnish Soviet Socialist Republic. The occupied Baltic states were also given the status of "independent" Soviet republics. After the occupation of the Baltic states, the Soviet Union presented an ultimatum to Romania, according to which it would take Bessarabia, and thus the Moldovan Soviet Socialist Republic was formed from most of Bessarabia and part of the then Moldovan Autonomous Soviet Socialist Republic, which had been a part of the Ukrainian SSR. Thus there were de facto 16 Soviet republics, but the state emblem was changed to reflect this only after the end of WWII. By a decision of Presidium of the Supreme Soviet of the USSR on 26 June 1946, all 16 constituent republics were represented on the emblem. The USSR State Motto was inscribed on 16 ribbons in 16 languages. Inscriptions in Azerbaijani, Kazakh, Kyrgyz, Tajik, Turkmen and Uzbek languages were updated due to the transfer from Latin to Cyrillic script of the respective languages within the USSR. Also, several language from newly annexed republics were added: Finnish and Romanian (written by Cyrillic and officially called "Moldovan") as well as Lithuanian, Latvian and Estonian.

The third version is not symmetrical: a Russian ribbon in the centre and eight ribbons on the left, but seven ribbons on the right.

=== Fourth and final version (1956–1991) ===
Versions valid in the years:
1956–1991 (15 languages)	Stamp version used on printed materials.

In 1956, the Karelo-Finnish SSR was demoted into the Karelian ASSR and a part of the Russian SFSR, and soon this was reflected on the USSR state emblem. By a decision of the Presidium of the Supreme Soviet of the USSR on 12 September 1956, the ribbon bearing the USSR State Motto in Finnish was removed.

A minor change in the Belarusian inscription was a decision of the Presidium of the Supreme Soviet of the USSR on 1 April 1958.

Inscriptions on the ribbons (which are translated into English as "Proletarians of the world, unite!") are as follows:

Left	Right
Turkmen: Әхли юртларың пролетарлары, бирлешиң! (Ähli ýurtlaryň proletarlary, birleşiň!)	Estonian: Kõigi maade proletaarlased, ühinege!
Tajik: Пролетарҳои ҳамаи мамлакатҳо, як шавед! (Proletarhoyi hamayi mamlakatho, yak şaved!)	Armenian: Պրոլետարներ բոլոր երկրների, միացե՜ք (Proletarner bolor erkrneri, miac’ek’!)
Latvian: Visu zemju proletārieši, savienojieties!	Kyrgyz: Бардык өлкөлөрдүн пролетарлары, бириккиле! (Bardık ölkölördün proletarları, birikkile!)
Lithuanian: Visų šalių proletarai, vienykitės!	Romanian (Moldovan Cyrillic): Пролетарь дин тоатe цэриле, уници-вэ! (Proletari din toate țările, uniți-vă!)
Georgian: პროლეტარებო ყველა ქვეყნისა, შეერთდით! (P’rolet’arebo q’vela kveq’nisa, sheertdit!)	Azerbaijani: Бүтүн өлкәләрин пролетарлары, бирләшин! (Bütün ölkələrin proletarları, birləşin!)
Uzbek: Бутун дунё пролетарлари, бирлашингиз! (Butun dunyo proletarlari, birlashingiz!)	Kazakh: Барлық елдердің пролетарлары, бірігіңдер! (Barlyq elderdıñ proletarlary, bırıgıñder!)
Ukrainian: Пролетарі всіх країн, єднайтеся! (Proletari vsikh krain, yednaitesia!)	Belarusian: Пралетарыі ўсіх краін, яднайцеся! (Praletaryi wsich krain, jadnajcesia!)
Russian: Пролетарии всех стран, соединяйтесь! (Proletarii vsekh stran, soyedinyaytes′!)

The coat of arms continued to appear after the dissolution of the Soviet Union even in Soviet ruble banknotes until 1994 when many post-Soviet states began to issue their own currencies. Public usage of the Soviet emblem formally ended in 2002 when Russia and other former republics ceased issuing Soviet passports.

== Description ==
The state emblem shows the traditional Soviet emblems of the Hammer and Sickle and the Red Star over a globe, and two wreaths of emmer wheat covered by "Workers of the world, unite!" in the official languages of the Soviet Republics, in the reverse order they were mentioned in the Soviet Constitution.

Each Soviet Republic (SSR) and Autonomous Soviet Republic (ASSR) had its own coat of arms, largely modeled after the state emblem of the Soviet Union.

== Gallery ==
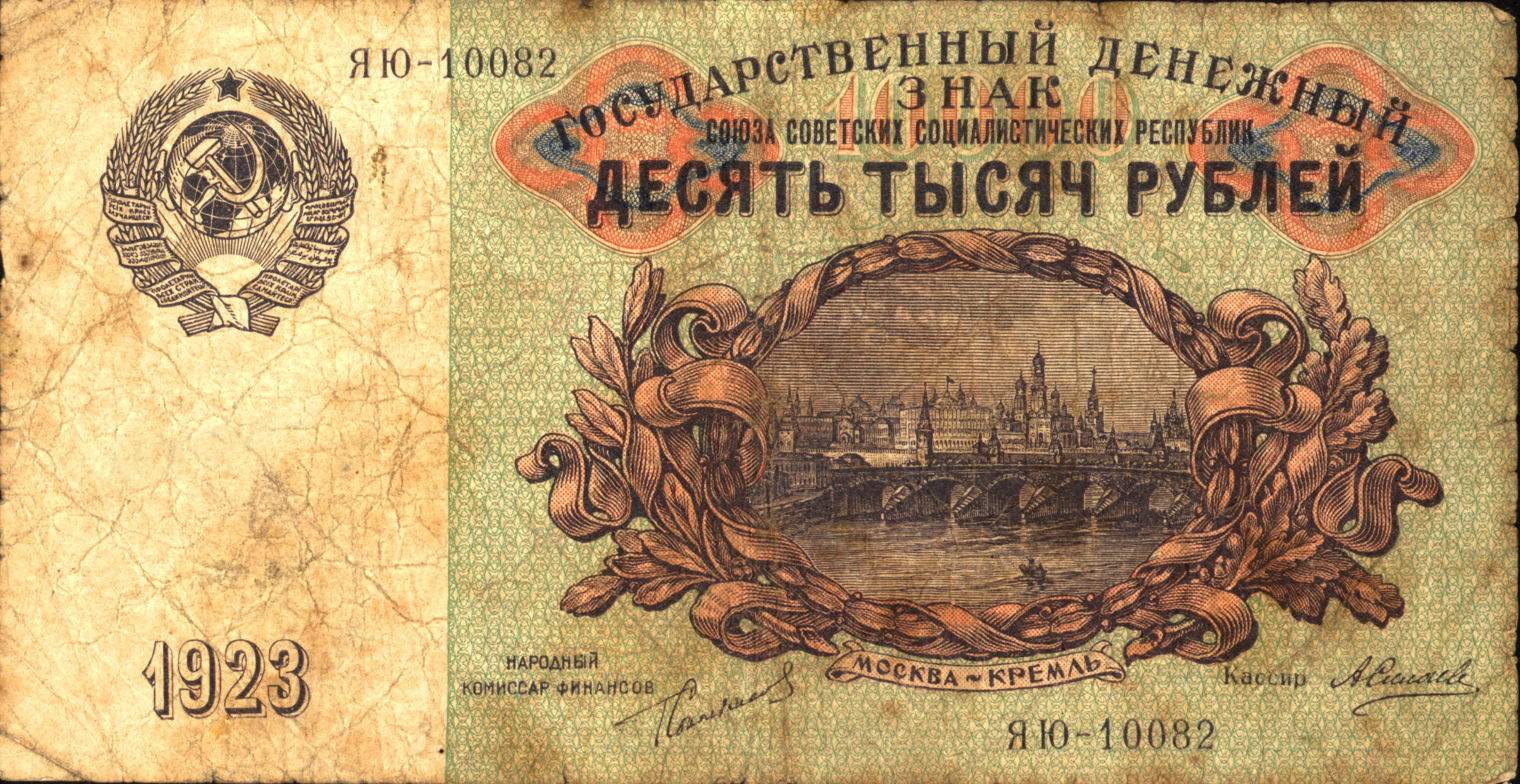
Emblem on the 10,000 ruble banknote, 1923

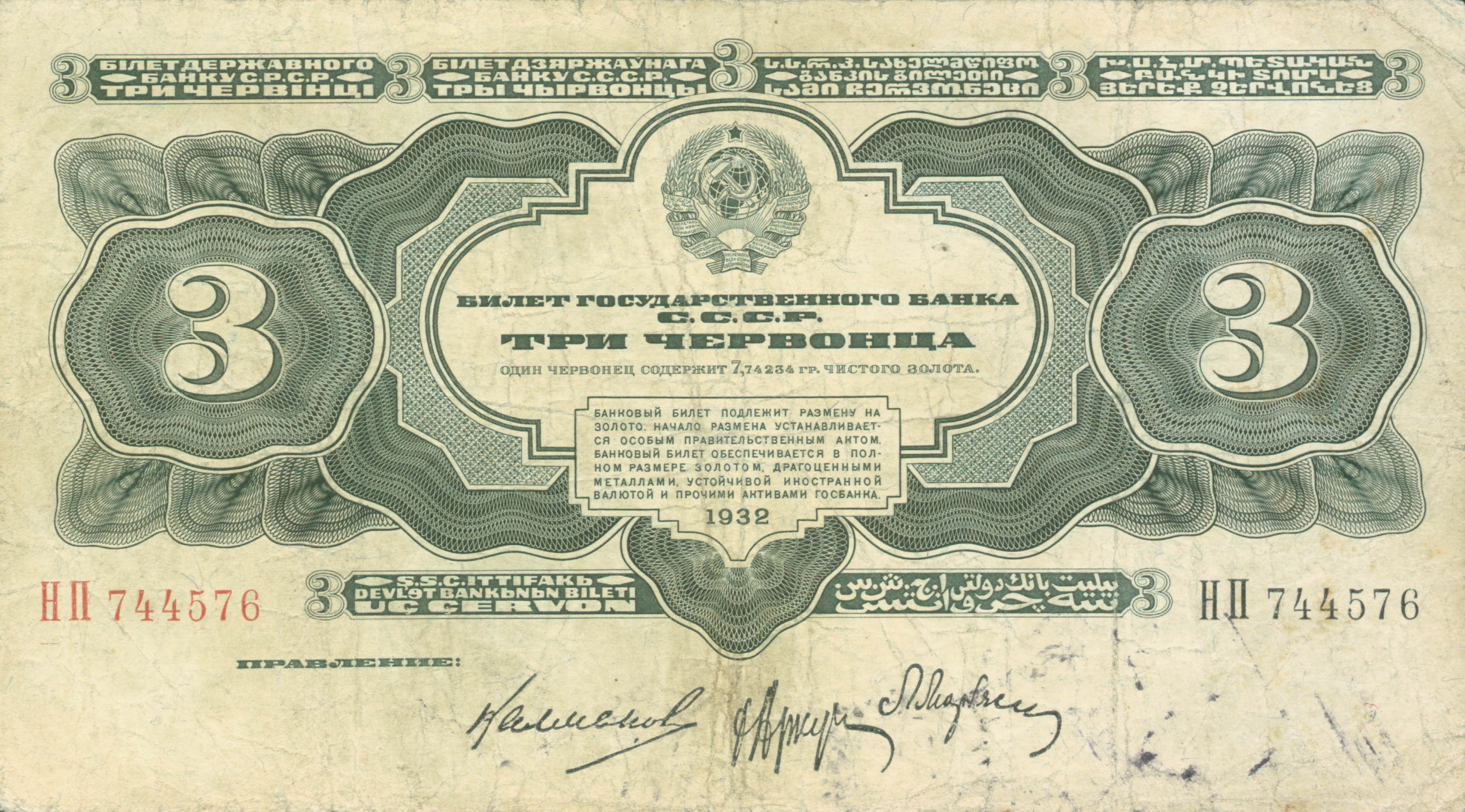
Emblem on the 3 ruble banknote, 1932

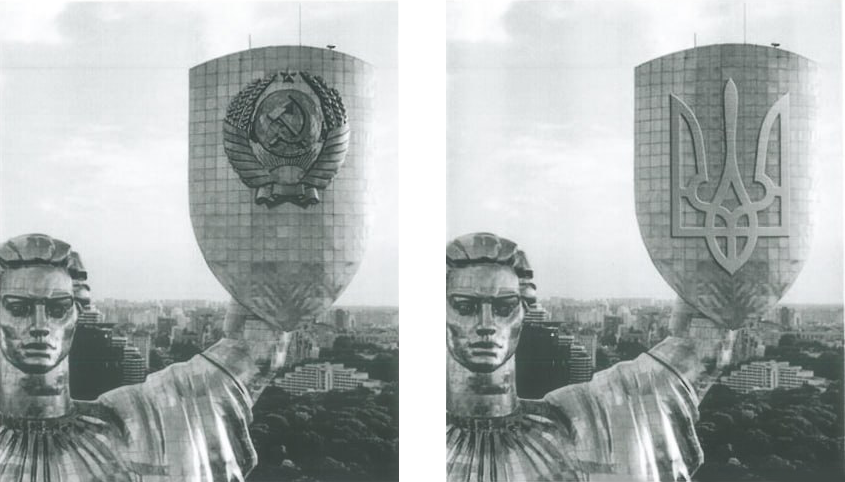
The USSR emblem on the Motherland monument in Kyiv (1981-2023), replaced by the Ukrainian tryzub.

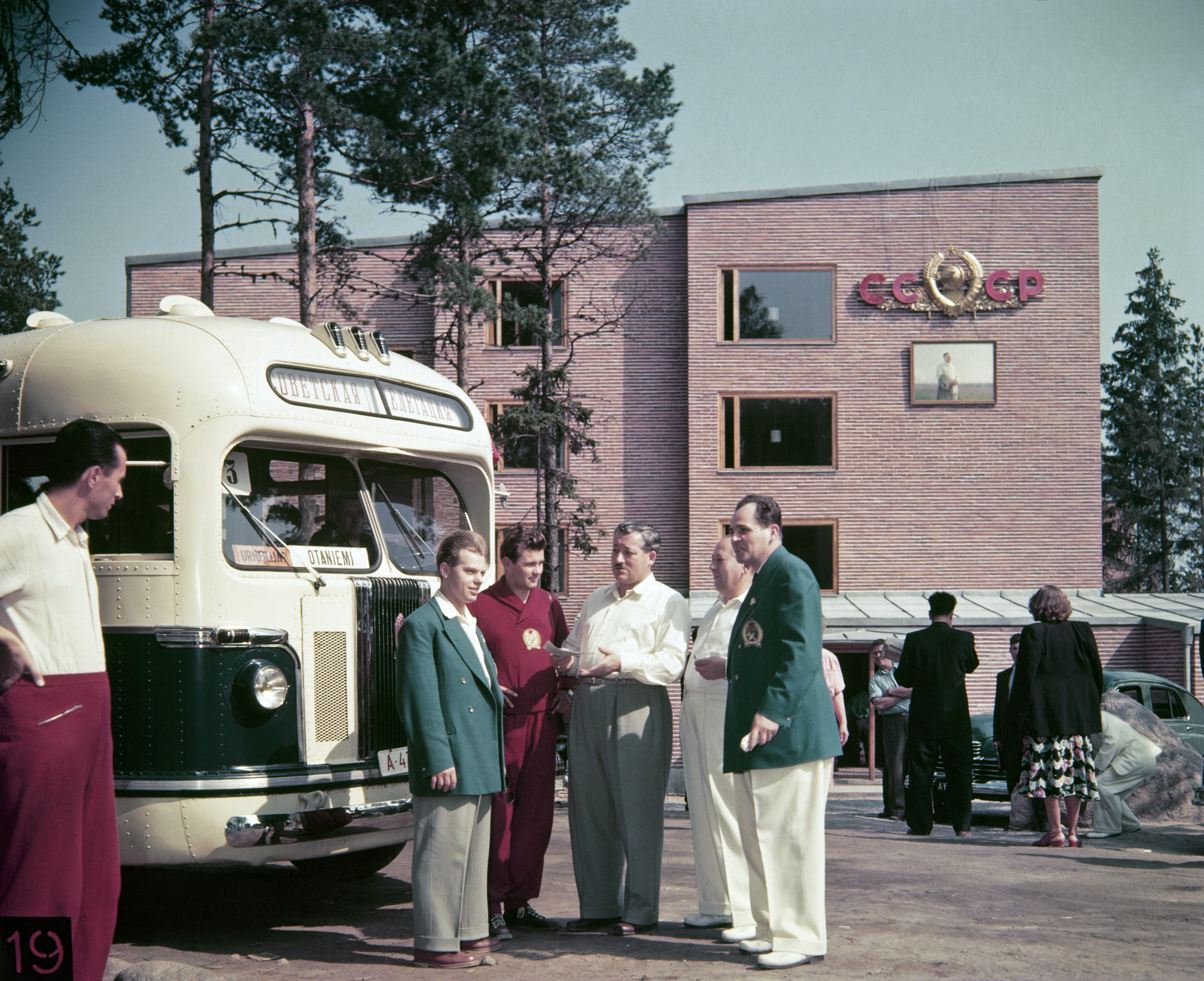
State Emblem of the Soviet Union during the 1952 Summer Olympics in Helsinki.

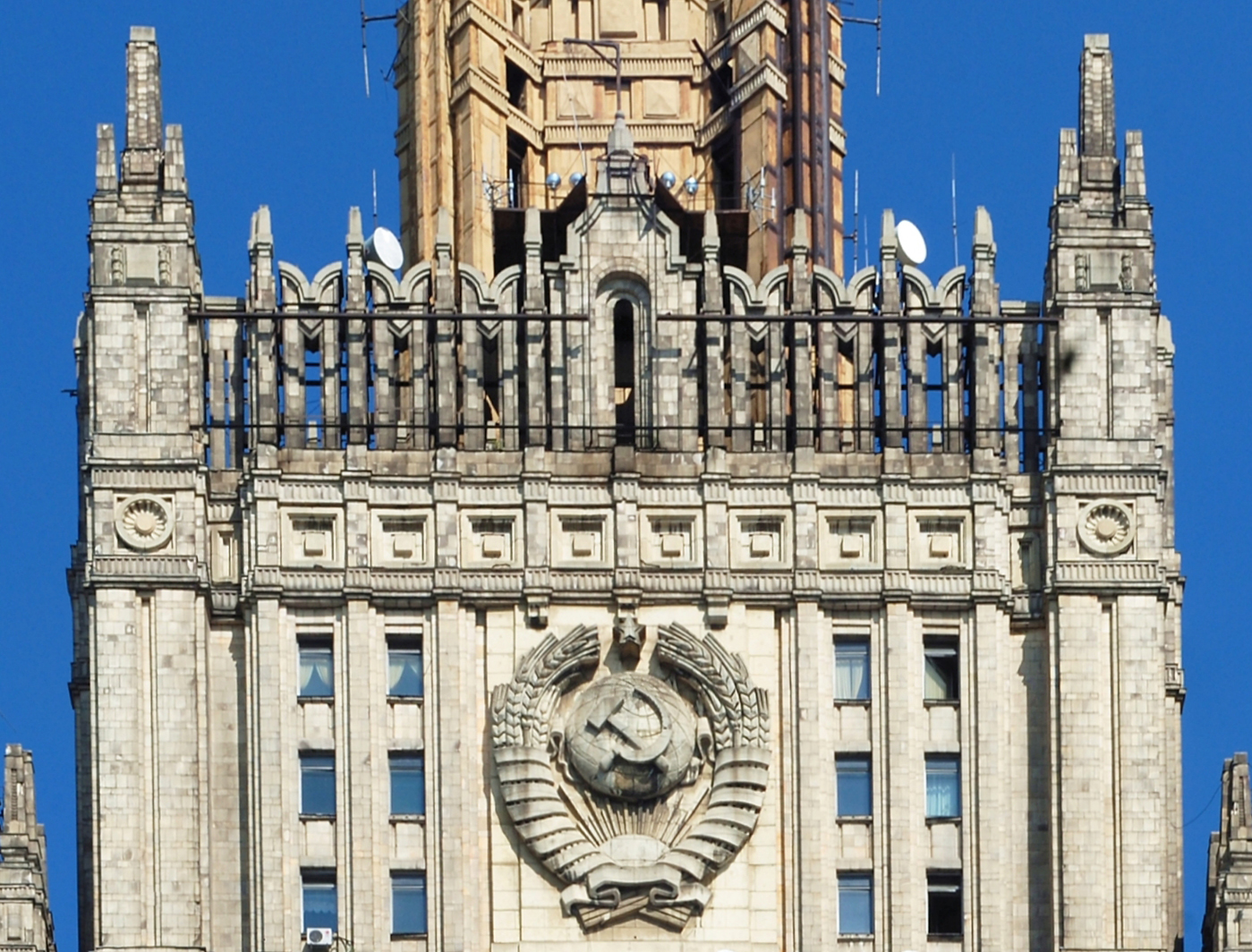
Soviet state emblem on the building of the Russian Ministry of Foreign Affairs, 2011. 16 ribbons are present.
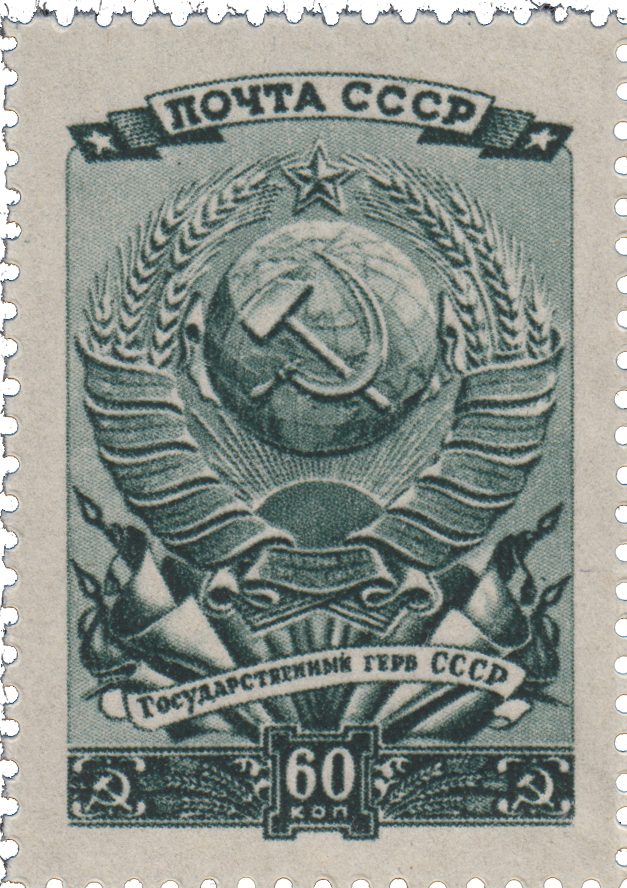
Postage stamp, 1946

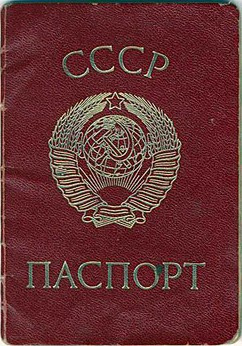
Cover page of a 1974 Soviet passport.

== See also ==
- Emblems of the Soviet Republics
- State Quality Mark of the USSR
- Flag of the Soviet Union
- Emblem of the Russian Soviet Federative Socialist Republic
- Coat of arms of Russia
- National emblem of China
- National emblem of East Germany
