= Red star =

Symbol associated with communist ideology

A red five-pointed star

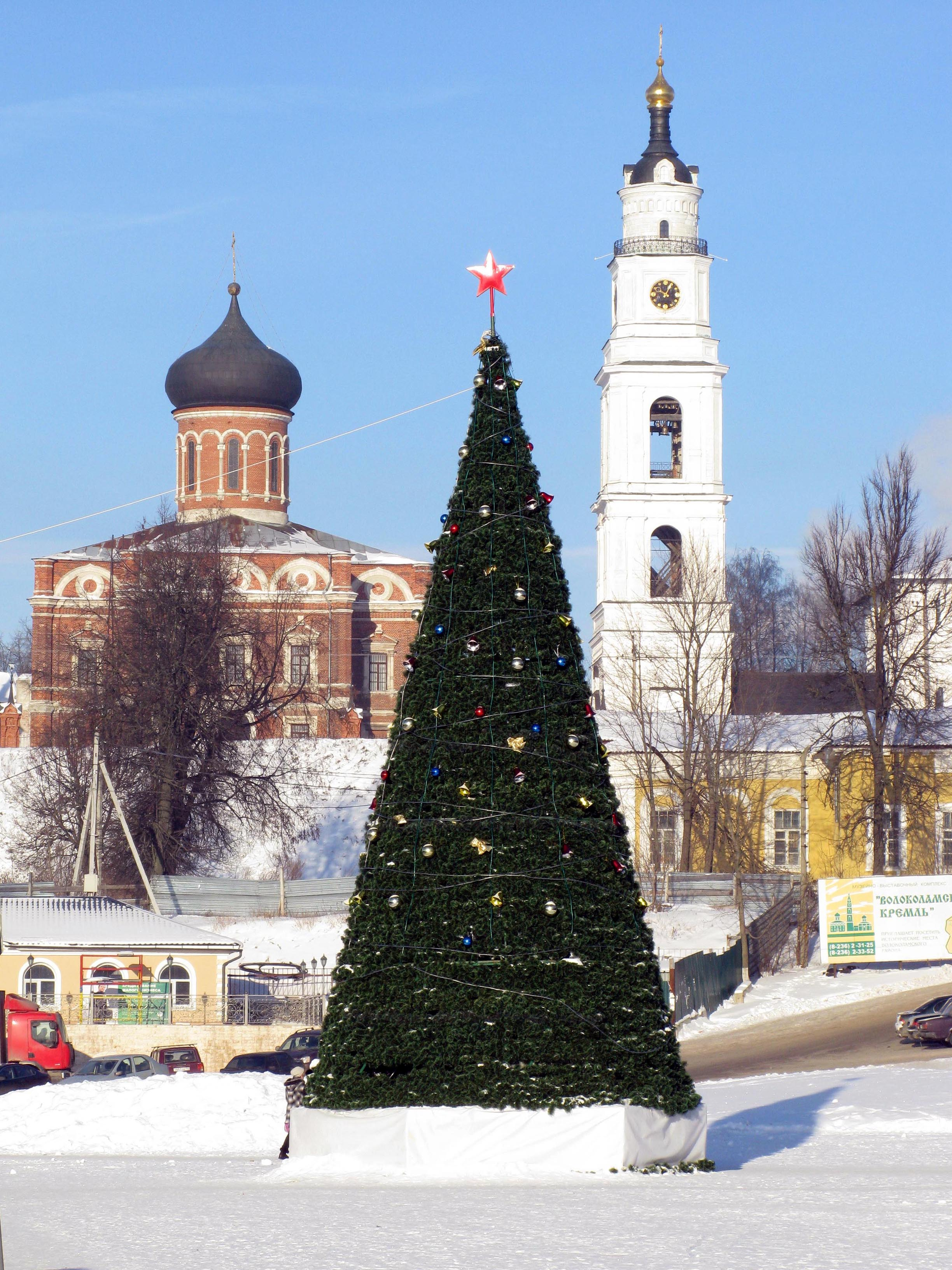
A New Year tree with a red star in front of a church cupola in Volokolamsk, Russia, 2010.

A red star, five-pointed and filled, is a symbol that has often historically been associated with communist ideology, particularly in combination with the hammer and sickle, but is also used as a purely socialist symbol in the 21st century. It has been widely used in flags, state emblems, monuments, ornaments, and logos. A golden star or yellow star is also a closely-associated symbol to the red star in the context of contemporary China and Vietnam, similarly representing communism and socialism.

Some former Warsaw Pact nations have passed laws banning it, describing it as a symbol of far-left totalitarian ideology. The red star has also been used in a non-communist context and before the emergence of this movement, in symbols of countries and states since the 19th century. It appears for example on the flag of New Zealand and that of the U.S. state of California. The red star has also been used as a logo by private agencies and corporations, such as the oil brand Texaco and the beer Heineken.

== History ==
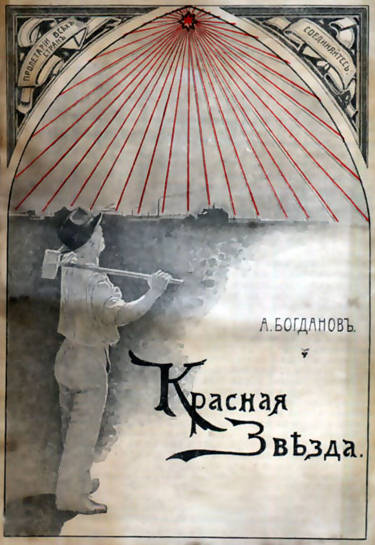
Red Star (1908)

The star's origins as a symbol of communist mass movements dates from the time of the Bolshevik Revolution and the Russian Civil War, but the precise first use remains unknown. The red star as a symbol of the Red Army was proposed by the Military Collegium for the organization of the Red Army and the creator of the Red Star emblem was the Bolshevik commander of the Petrograd Military District, Konstantin Eremeev. On the other hand, one account of the symbol's origin traces its roots to the Moscow troop garrison toward the end of World War I. At this time, many troops were fleeing from the Austrian and German fronts, joining the local Moscow garrison upon their arrival in the city. To distinguish the Moscow troops from the influx of retreating front-liners, officers gave out tin stars to the Moscow garrison soldiers to wear on their hats. When those troops joined the Red Army and the Bolsheviks they painted their tin stars red, the color of socialism, thus creating the original red star.

The red star was used in communist media as early as in 1908 with the publication of the novel Red Star by Bolshevik revolutionary Alexander Bogdanov, which describes a technologically advanced communist civilization on Mars.

Another claimed origin for the red star relates to an alleged encounter between Leon Trotsky and Nikolai Krylenko. Krylenko, an Esperantist, wore a green-star lapel badge; Trotsky inquired as to its meaning and received an explanation that each arm of the star represented one of the five traditional continents. On hearing that, Trotsky specified that soldiers of the Red Army should wear a similar red star.

One interpretation sees the five points as representing the five fingers of the worker's hand, as well as the five populated continents (counting the Americas as one). A lesser-known suggestion is that in communist symbolism, the five points on the star were intended to represent the five social groups that would lead Russia to communism: the youth, the military, the industrial labourers, the agricultural workers or peasantry and the intelligentsia. In Soviet heraldry, the red star symbolized the Red Army and military service, as opposed to the hammer and sickle, which symbolized peaceful labour.

Regardless of the star's exact origin, it was incorporated into the Red Army's uniforms and heraldry as early as 1918.

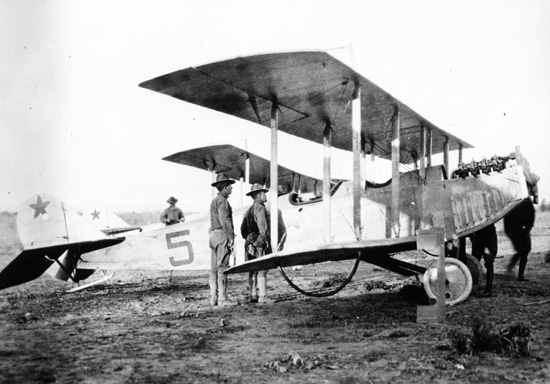
U.S. Army Signal Corps Curtiss JN-3 biplanes with red star insignia, 1915

Shortly before the founding of the Soviet Union, in mid-March 1916 the U.S. Army Signal Corps' aviation section used the red star for the national insignia for U.S. aircraft on the aircraft of the Signal Corps' 1st Aero Squadron during the Pancho Villa Expedition to apprehend the Mexican revolutionary Pancho Villa.

=== Use in the USSR and its constituent republics ===
The symbol became one of the most prominent of the Soviet Union, adorning nearly all official buildings, awards and insignia. Sometimes the hammer and sickle appeared inside or below the star. In 1930 the Soviet Union established the Order of the Red Star and awarded its insignia to Red Army and Soviet Navy personnel for "exceptional service in the cause of the defense of the Soviet Union in both war and peace". The Soviet and Russian Federation military newspaper bore and bears the name Red Star (Russian: Krasnaya Zvezda).

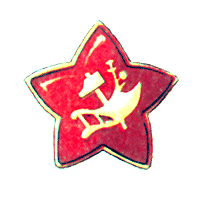
Red Army cap badge (1918–1922)

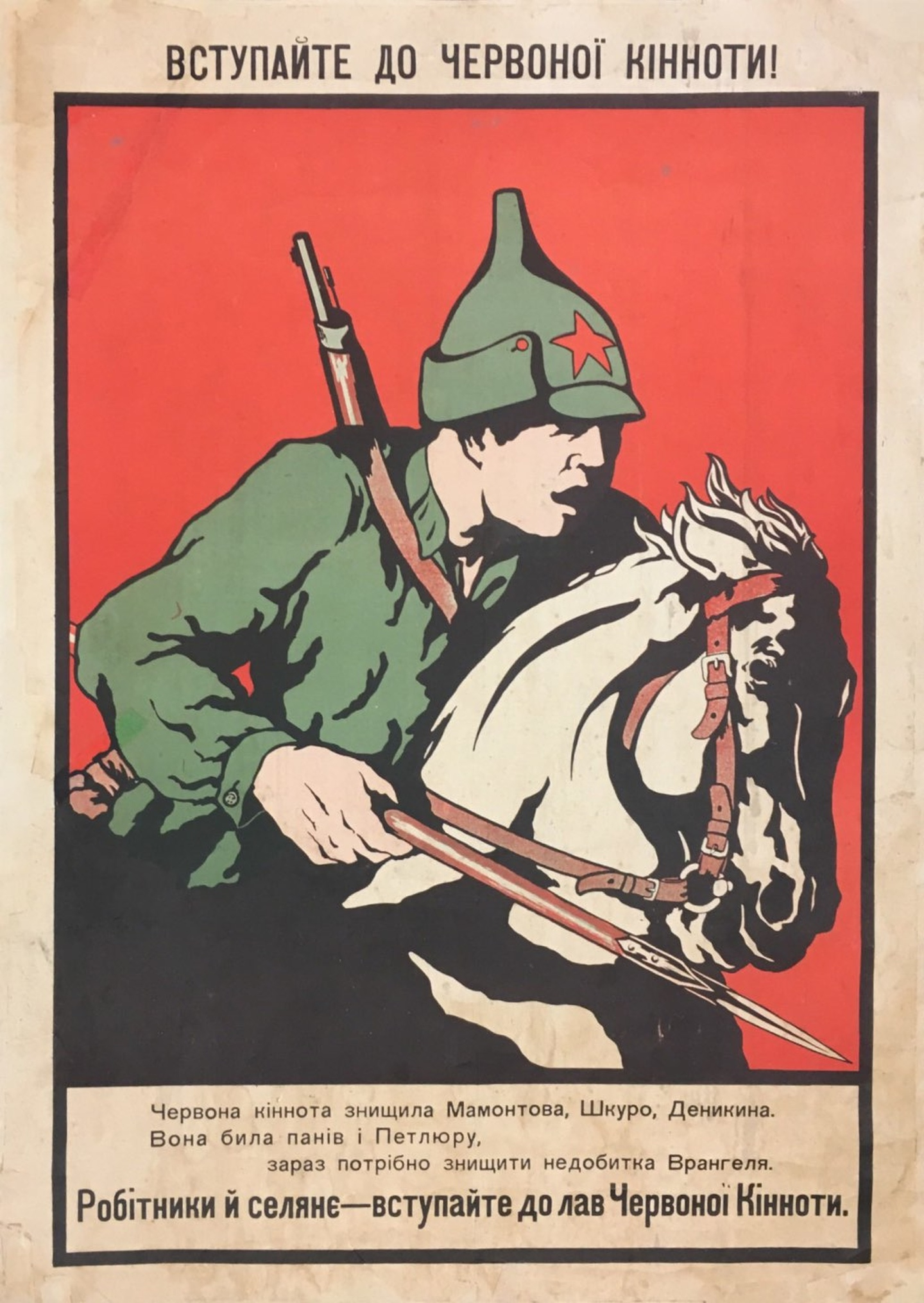
Red Cavalry poster depicting a red star on a budenovka hat (1920)

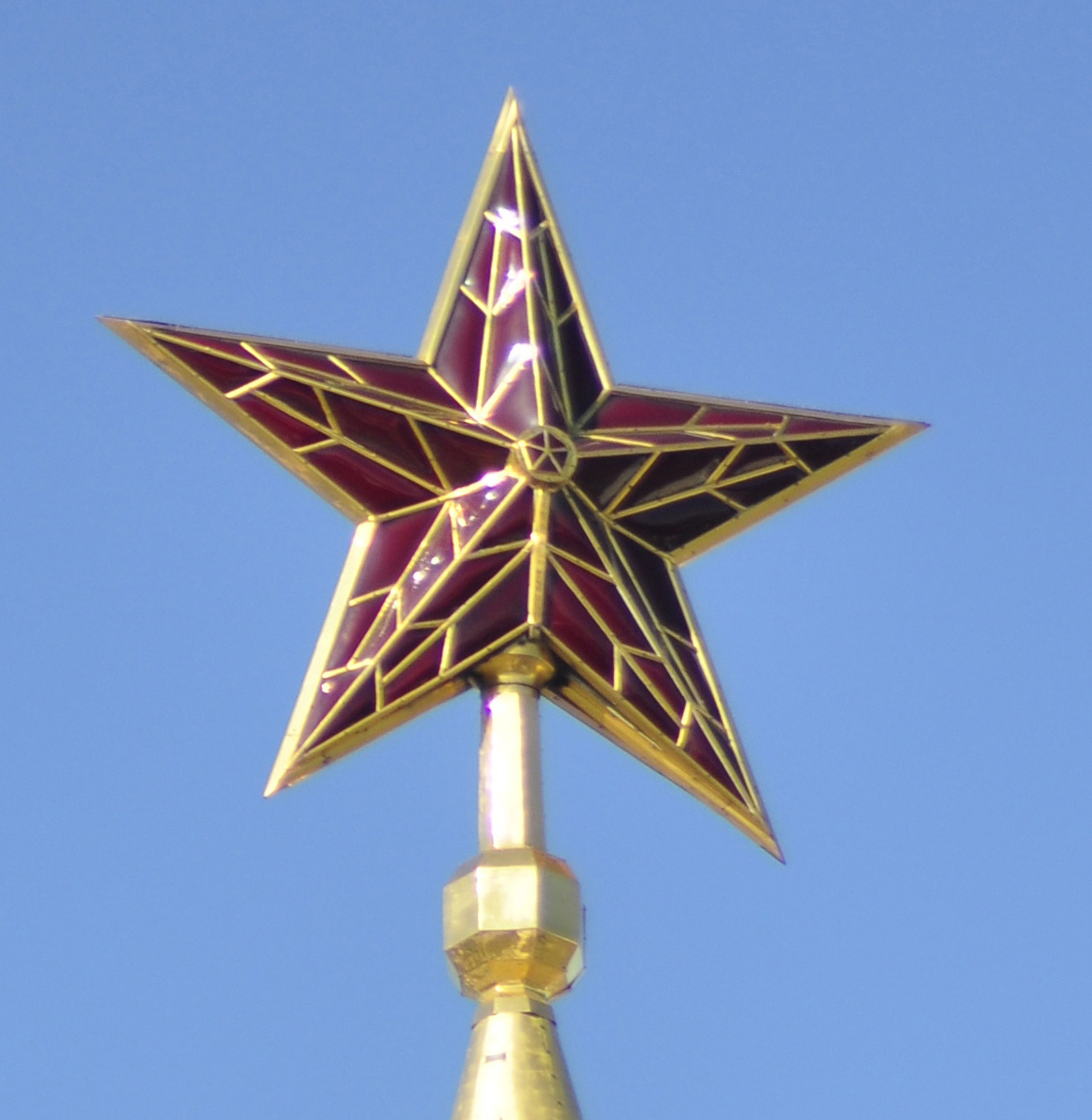
Kremlin Star, Moscow (1937)

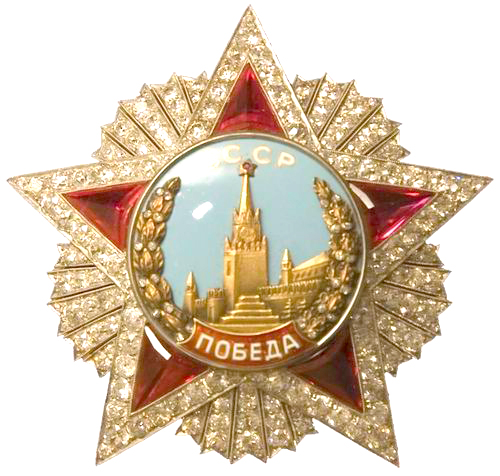
Soviet Order of Victory, USSR (1945)

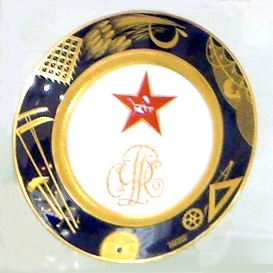
Plate by Adamovich, Russian SFSR (1921)

Roundel of the Soviet Air Force

==== As a holiday ornament ====
During the 1930s, Soviet publications encouraged the practice of decorating a New Year's tree, known as a yolka (Russian: Ёлка). These trees were often decorated with a red star, a practice that has continued in Russia since the 1991 dissolution of the Soviet Union.

==== Gallery of the heraldry of Soviet republics ====
Coat of arms of the Union of Soviet Socialist Republics

Coat of arms of the Azerbaijan Soviet Socialist Republic

Coat of arms of the Byelorussian Soviet Socialist Republic

Coat of arms of the Estonian Soviet Socialist Republic

Coat of arms of the Georgian Soviet Socialist Republic

Coat of arms of the Kazakh Soviet Socialist Republic

Coat of arms of the Kirghiz Soviet Socialist Republic

Coat of arms of the Latvian Soviet Socialist Republic

Coat of arms of the Lithuanian Soviet Socialist Republic

Coat of arms of the Moldavian Soviet Socialist Republic

Coat of arms of the Russian Soviet Federative Socialist Republic

Coat of arms of the Tajik Soviet Socialist Republic

Coat of arms of the Turkmen Soviet Socialist Republic

Coat of arms of the Ukrainian Soviet Socialist Republic

Coat of arms of the Uzbek Soviet Socialist Republic

Emblem of the Transcaucasian Socialist Federative Soviet Republic (1923–1936)

Emblem of the Karelo-Finnish Soviet Socialist Republic (1941–1956)

Coat of arms of the Latvian Socialist Soviet Republic (1919–1920)

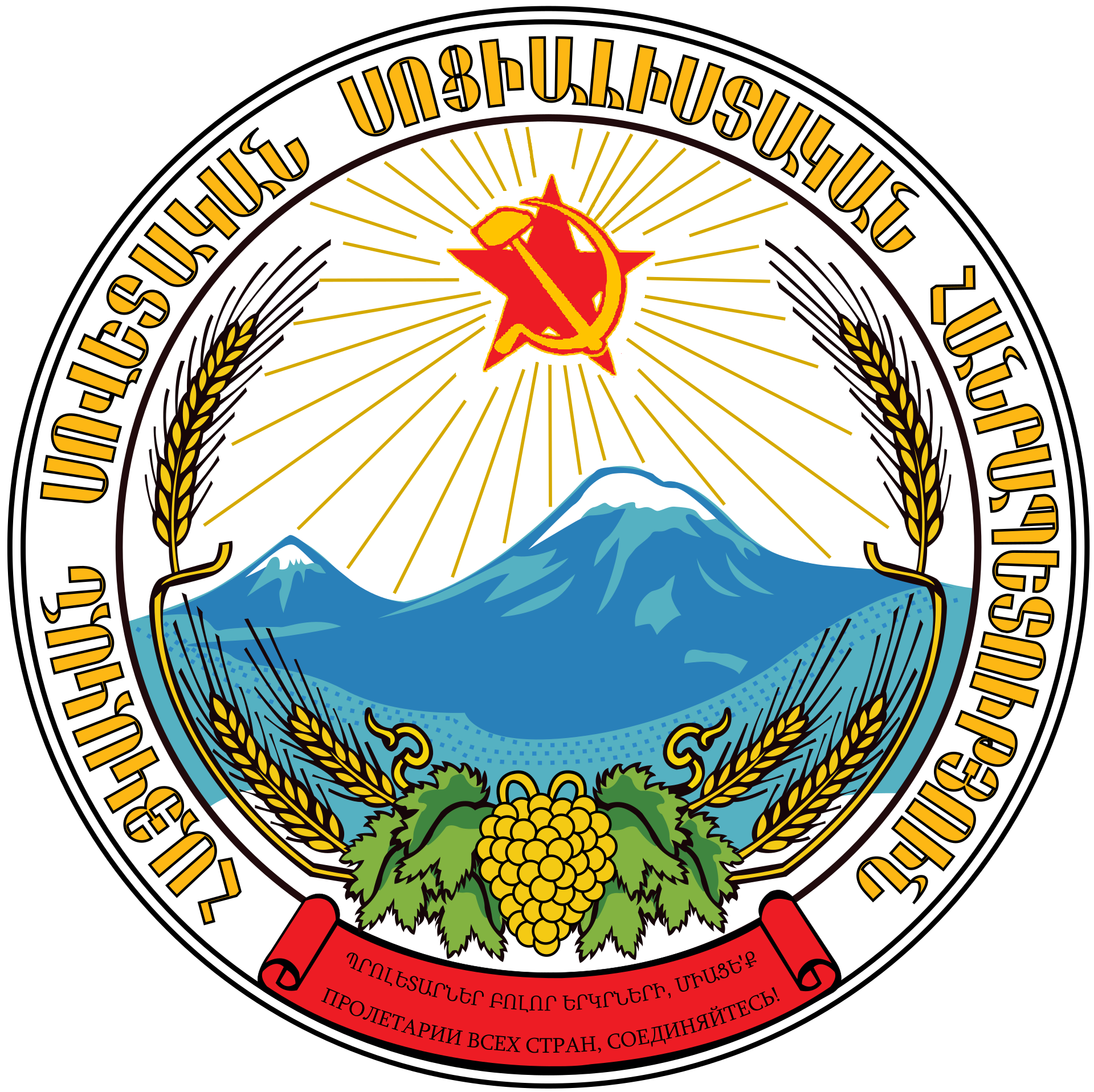
Coat of Arms of the Armenian Soviet Socialist Republic (1936–1990)

==== Gallery of Soviet flags ====
Flag of the Union of Soviet Socialist Republics

Flag of the Armenian Soviet Socialist Republic

Flag of the Azerbaijan Soviet Socialist Republic

Flag of the Byelorussian Soviet Socialist Republic

Flag of the Estonian Soviet Socialist Republic

Flag of the Georgian Soviet Socialist Republic

Flag of the Kazakh Soviet Socialist Republic

Flag of the Kyrgyz Soviet Socialist Republic

Flag of the Latvian Soviet Socialist Republic

Flag of the Lithuanian Soviet Socialist Republic

Flag of the Moldavian Soviet Socialist Republic

Flag of the Russian Soviet Federative Socialist Republic

Flag of the Tajik Soviet Socialist Republic

Flag of the Turkmen Soviet Socialist Republic

Flag of the Ukrainian Soviet Socialist Republic

Flag of the Uzbek Soviet Socialist Republic

Flag of Oryol

Flag of the Karelo-Finnish Soviet Socialist Republic (1953–1956)

Flag of the Transcaucasian Socialist Federative Soviet Republic (1922–1936)

=== Use in other socialist countries ===
Following its adoption as an emblem of the Soviet Union, the red star became a symbol for communism around the world.

Several Communist states subsequently adopted the red star symbol, often placing it on their respective flags and coats of arms – for example on the flag of the Socialist Federal Republic of Yugoslavia. Separatist and socialist movements also sometimes adopted the red star, as on the Estelada flag in the Catalan countries.

==== Eastern Bloc ====
The red star became a common element of the flags and heraldry of socialist states in the Eastern Bloc, appearing in heraldry for virtually all of the countries, and on the flags of Bulgaria, Hungary, Romania, and Albania. From 1991 to 1995, Belarus dropped its Soviet-style emblem in favor of an emblem featuring the Pahonia; the Soviet-era heraldry was re-adopted in 1995, and continues to be used today with minor modifications in 2012 and 2020.

Flag of the People's Republic of Bulgaria (1971–1990)

Flag of the Socialist Republic of Romania (1965–1989)

Flag of the People's Socialist Republic of Albania (1946–1992)

Flag of the Hungarian People's Republic (1949–1956)

Coat of arms of the Socialist Republic of Romania

Coat of arms of the People's Republic of Bulgaria (1971–1990)

Coat of arms of the Hungarian People's Republic (1957–1990)

Coat of arms of the People's Socialist Republic of Albania

Coat of arms of Czechoslovak Socialist Republic (1961–1989)

Emblem of Belarus (1995–2012)

Emblem of Belarus (2012–2020)

Emblem of Belarus (since 2020)

==== Yugoslavia ====
In former Yugoslavia the red star served not only a communist symbol, but also as a more generic symbol of resistance against Fascism and the Nazi occupation of Yugoslavia, as well as of opposition to its associated ethnic policies. Tito's partisans wore the red star as an identification symbol during World War II and the practice was continued with most uniformed organisations wearing the red star, either embroidered or enamelled, as a cap badge.

Flag of the Socialist Federal Republic of Yugoslavia

Flag of the Socialist Republic of Serbia and flag of the Socialist Republic of Montenegro

Flag of the Socialist Republic of Slovenia

Flag of the Socialist Republic of Croatia

Flag of the Socialist Republic of Bosnia and Herzegovina

Flag of the Socialist Republic of Macedonia
Coat of arms of the Socialist Federal Republic of Yugoslavia

Coat of arms of the Yugoslav Socialist Republic of Serbia

Coat of arms of the Yugoslav Socialist Republic of Slovenia

Coat of arms of the Yugoslav Socialist Republic of Croatia

Coat of arms of the Yugoslav Socialist Republic of Bosnia and Herzegovina

Coat of arms of the Yugoslav Socialist Republic of Macedonia

Coat of arms of the Yugoslav Socialist Republic of Montenegro

==== Asia ====
As communist movements spread across Asia, some entities used a red star, while others used a yellow star (often on a red field) with the same symbolism. The Far Eastern Republic of 1920 to 1922 used a yellow star on its military uniforms, and the flag of the People's Republic of China has five yellow stars on a red field. The flag of Vietnam and its associated symbols also have a yellow star on a red field. Examples of communes and villages in China named after the red star include Hongxing Village in Huilong Township, Hubei, China and Kizilto in Xinjiang (named Hongxing Commune during the Cultural Revolution).

Emblem of North Korea (1948–1993)

Emblem of Laos (1975–1992)

State emblem of the Mongolian People's Republic (1960–1992)

Coat of arms of South Yemen (1970–1990)

Flag of Vietnam

Flag of the People's Republic of China

Flag of the Democratic People's Republic of Korea

Flag of the Mongolian People's Republic

Flag of South Yemen (1967–1990)

Flag of the Democratic Republic of Afghanistan (1980–1987)

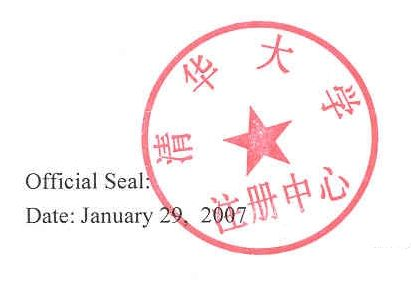
Red star being featured in Tsinghua University's official seal. Many Chinese organizations use the same red star seal template.

==== Africa ====
Socialist countries in Africa also incorporated the red or gold stars into their heraldry. This practice was also adopted by countries that formed following anti-colonial national liberation struggles, which often involved Marxist organizations.

Emblem of Mozambique

Flag of Mozambique

Flag of Burkina Faso

Emblem of the People's Republic of Benin

Flag of Angola

Flag of Ethiopia (1987–1991)

Flag of Djibouti

Flag of Zimbabwe

Flag of Benin (1975–1990)

Flag of the People's Republic of the Congo (1969–1992)

Presidential Standard of the DR Madagascar

Emblem of the Democratic Republic of Madagascar

==== State military units ====
By March 2010, the Government of Russia readopted the Soviet red star (but now with a blue outline reflecting the three colors – white, blue and red – of the Russian flag) as a military insignia. The Russian Air Force used this star as a roundel up to 2013, when Russia re-instated the Soviet-era red star.

As of 2014 the Armed Forces of Belarus still use the old Soviet red star. The coat of arms of Armed Forces of the Republic of Kazakhstan includes a modified version of the Soviet red star.

Early swastika and red star emblem of the Mongolian Revolutionary Youth League, used from 1921 to 1924.

Early taijitu and red star emblem of the Mongolian Revolutionary Youth League, used from 1925 to 1942.

Emblem of Mongolian Revolutionary Youth League.

First emblem of the Korean People's Army used from February 1948, the taeguk was dropped several months later.

Soviet Military Air Force (1943–1991), Russian Military Air Force (1992–2010), Belarusian Air Force, and Tajik Air Force roundel

Russian Military Air Force roundel

Symbol of the Armed Forces of the Republic of Belarus

Emblem of the Armed Forces of the Republic of Kazakhstan

Emblem of the Korean People's Army

Emblem of the Chinese People's Liberation Army

People's Republic of Yemen Air Force roundel (1967–1980)

People's Republic of Yemen Air Force roundel (1980–1990)

==== By states with limited recognition ====
Transnistria and the Luhansk People's Republic are proto-states located in Eastern Europe. Due to their historical association with the Soviet Union, they have adopted socialist imagery – including the red star – into their flags and heraldry. The Zapatista autonomous territories also make use of the symbol.

Flag of Transnistria

Coat of Arms of the Luhansk People's Republic

==== By sports teams ====
Several sporting clubs from countries ruled by communist parties used the red star as a symbol and named themselves after it, such as the Serbian club Red Star Belgrade (Serbian: Црвена звезда / Crvena zvezda), the East German Roter Stern Leipzig, the Angolan Estrela Vermelha do Huambo, the Estrela Vermelha from Beira, Mozambique or the Czechoslovak Rudá Hvězda Brno. Some sports teams from non-communist countries used it, such as French Red Star from Paris, Swiss club FC Red Star Zürich, English Seaham Red Star F.C., and even an American women's soccer club (Chicago Stars FC (formerly Chicago Red Stars)—though in that case the star is based on the flag of Chicago and not on the communist logo). The American soccer clubs Sacramento Republic FC and D.C. United also use red stars in their logos, referencing the flags of California and the District of Columbia respectively. The German rowing club Pirnaer Ruderverein 1872 began (and continues) to use red star since the 19th century.

Pirnaer Ruderverein 1872

== Use by socialist groups ==
=== Armed revolutionary organizations ===
In 1970, the Red Army Faction, a West German militant group, used a red star paired with a Heckler & Koch MP5 in their highly recognizable insignia.

In 1994, the red star was included in the flag of the armed revolutionary Zapatista Army of National Liberation (EZLN) in Chiapas, Mexico.

A number of communist parties in Turkey utilize the red star. Likewise, a number of Kurdish revolutionary organizations connected to the Kurdistan Communities Union utilize the red star in their iconography. Those include the flags of the Kurdistan Workers' Party and the battle flag pennants of the People's Defence Forces and Free Women's Units in Turkish Kurdistan, the People's Protection Units and Women's Protection Units in Syrian Kurdistan, and the Eastern Kurdistan Units and Women's Defense Forces in Iranian Kurdistan.

The Iranian Islamist-Socialist militant opposition group the Mojahedin-e-Khalq uses the red star with the rifle, sickle and the map of Iran in the background.

Red Army Faction (West German militant group) (RAF)

First of October Anti-Fascist Resistance Groups (GRAPO)

People's Liberation Army of Manipur (PLAM)

Zapatista Army of National Liberation (EZLN)

Marxist Leninist Communist Party (MLKP)

United Freedom Forces (BÖG)

International Freedom Battalion (IFB)

International Revolutionary People's Guerrilla Forces (IRPGF)

Kurdistan Communities Union (KCK)

Kurdistan Workers' Party (PKK)

People's Defence Forces (HPG)

Free Women's Units (YJA-STAR)

Civil Protection Units (YPS)

People's Protection Units (YPG)

Women's Protection Units (YPJ)

Eastern Kurdistan Units (HRK)

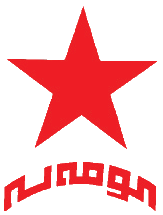
Komalah

People's Mujahedin of Iran (MEK)

Combat Organization of Anarcho-Communists (BOAK)

Flag of the Communist (Maoist) Party of Afghanistan

=== Political parties and movements ===
The Brazilian leftist Worker's Party uses a red star as its symbol with the party acronym (Portuguese: Partido dos Trabalhadores – PT) inside. Hugo Chávez and his supporters in Venezuela have used the red star in numerous symbols and logos, and have included it in the logo of the United Socialist Party of Venezuela (PSUV). It was also used throughout 2007 as a symbol of the "5 Engines of the Bolivarian Socialist Revolution". It is also used by the militant South African shack-dweller's movement Abahlali baseMjondolo. Like in Latin America and Africa, several European socialist parties continue to use a star as a part of their logos. The red star is also featured prominently in the independence flags of various separatist movements in Spain.

Symbol of Workers' Party (Brazil)

Symbol of the United Socialist Party of Venezuela

Symbol of the Democratic Youth Federation of India

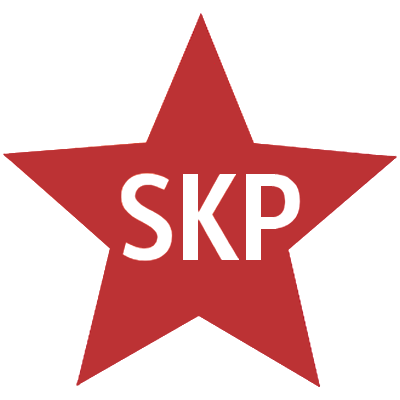
Symbol of the Finnish Communist Party

Symbol of the French Communist Party

Symbol of the Communist Party of Spain

Symbol of the Portuguese Communist Party

Symbol of the Dutch Socialist Party

Symbol of the Workers' Party of Belgium

Symbol of the Slovenian party The Left

Symbol of the Italian party Power to the People

Symbol of the Norwegian Red Party

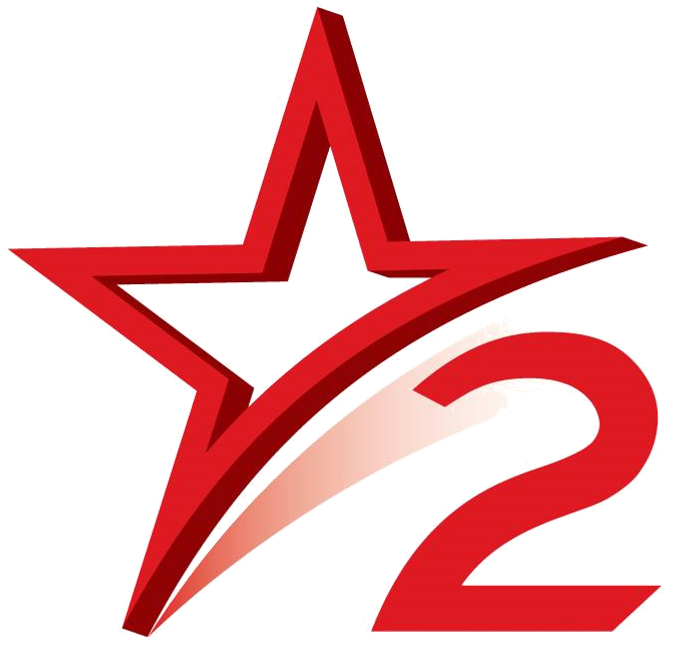
Symbol of the Ecuadorian party Popular Unity

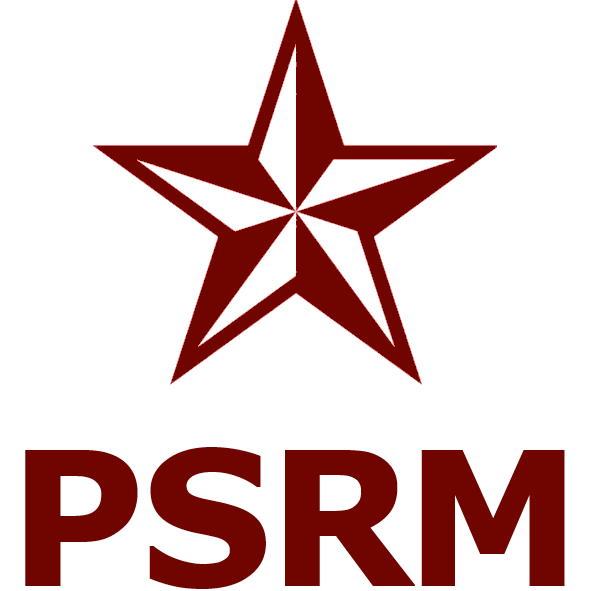
Symbol of the Party of Socialists of the Republic of Moldova

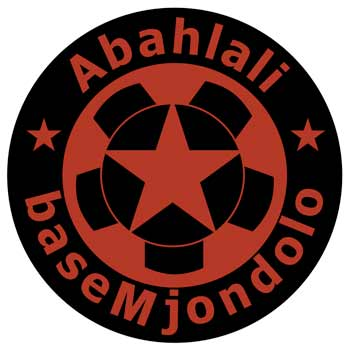
Symbol of the Abahlali baseMjondolo

Flag of the Andalusian Nation party

Castilian nationalist flag

Galician nationalist flag Estreleira

Catalan pro-independence flag Estelada Vermella

flag of the Yemeni Socialist Party

Yemeni Socialist Party, pre 1990

== Uses without socialist symbolism ==
Some red stars adopted in emblems and flags have a significance that does not originally relate to socialism. Among these, the most well-known include the current state flag of California (echoing the Californian red star flag of 1836) and the flag of New Zealand (designed in 1869, officially adopted in 1902). The flag of the District of Columbia (designed in 1921, adopted in 1938) recalls George Washington's coat of arms. DC Comics' Wonder Woman also wears a 5-point red star headband with gold or yellow background.

=== Crescent moon and star ===
The crescent moon and star was a symbol used by the Ottoman Empire. Various states with Ottoman history have thus adopted this symbol into their present-day flags.

Flag of Tunisia

Flag of Algeria

Flag of Northern Cyprus

Flag of Western Sahara

Emblem of Turkey

=== Assorted Flags and Coats of Arms ===
Flag of New Zealand.

Flag of Panama.

Flag of Syria (opposition group during the civil war). Was the independence flag first used in 1932.

Flag of California.

California Lone Star Flag – 1836.

Flag of Washington, D.C.

Flag of Acre State, Brazil.

Flag of Nagasaki city.

Flag of Birmingham, Alabama.

Arms of Għargħur, Malta.

Moríñigo coat of arms.

Coat of arms of Valais

Flag of Valais

Crain, Yonne coat of arms.

Chauriat coat of arms.

=== Symbol of animal relief ===
The red star was adopted as the symbol of the International Red Star Alliance, a Geneva international treaty signed in 1914 with the purpose of bringing about international cooperation on behalf of sick and wounded war animals, while securing the neutral status of the personnel engaged in such work. Besides the International Alliance, national Red Star societies were also established. Regarding animal relief, the International Red Star Alliance had an analogous role of that of the International Red Cross and Red Crescent Movement. To identify their neutral status, white brassards with red stars were worn by military veterinary personnel in World War I in a similar way medical personal worn brassards with red crosses.

Following the War, the American Red Star turned to focus on domestic issues, including care for animals during disasters. The organization waxed and waned over the decades, and as of 2016 exists as the American Humane Association's Red Star Animal Emergency Services.

== Red stars in labels and logos ==
Label of a Heineken bottle

Logo of Australian airline Jetstar

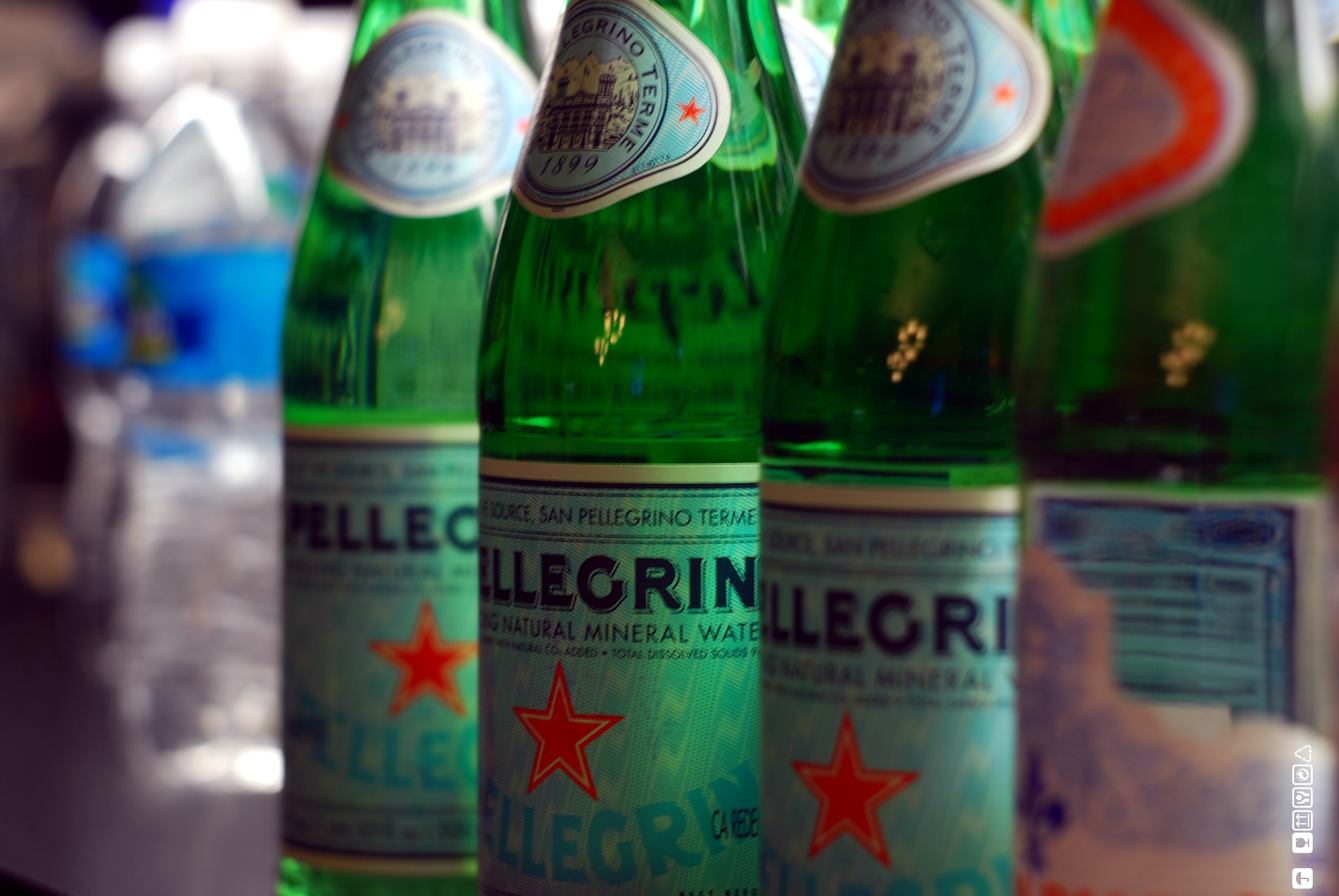
Photo of several Sanpellegrino bottles

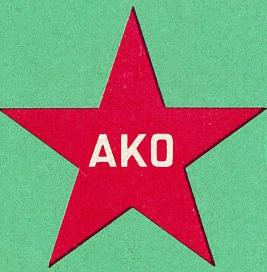
Logo of AKO, product of the Soviet Union

Logo of Macy's department stores

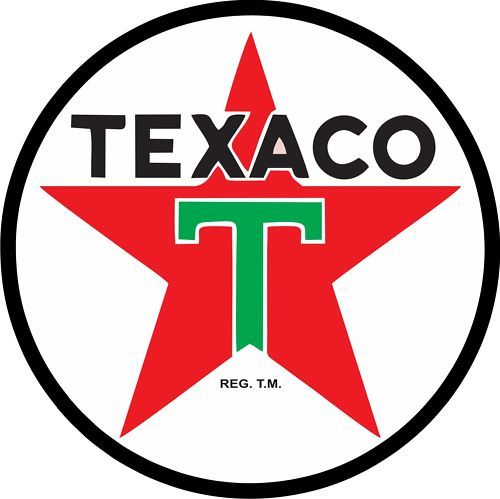
Texaco logo, circa 1913

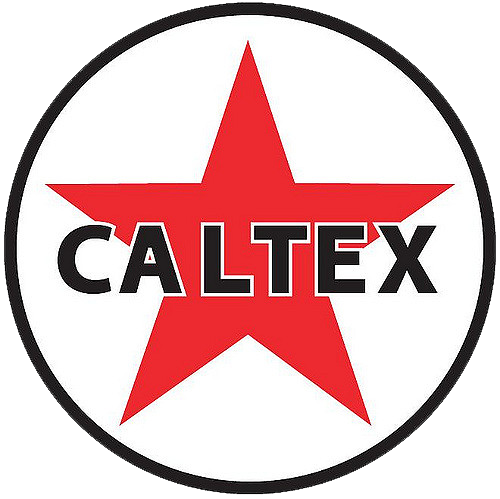
Caltex logo, circa 1936

House flag of the Kermit Line (1818–1835) and Red Star Line (1871–1935).

House flag of the Kermit Line (1835–1867)

House flag used by Columbia Transportation Division of the Oglebay Norton Corporation, used, among others, on board the SS Edmund Fitzgerald.

The red star was used by the Texaco oil company in various forms from 1909 to 1981. Its overseas division Caltex also used the red star until 1996. Red Star Yeast was produced for a century in Milwaukee, Baltimore, and Oakland before its subsumption as a brand by Lesaffre.

A brand of Erguotou, a type of Baijiu, was named "Hongxing" (Chinese: 红星; lit. 'Red Star') in 1949 to celebrate the founding of the People's Republic of China.

North Korea's Red Star operating system takes its name from the communist red star.

Red stars were included in the symbolism of many shipowners, such as Puget Sound Navigation Co. (1898–1927), Bombay Steam Navigation Co (since the 19th century), London & Overseas Freighters (1948–1997) and Columbia Transportation Division of the Oglebay Norton Corporation. The two companies were independently named Red Star Line in the 19th century.

== Legal status ==
The red star and the hammer and sickle are regarded as occupation symbols as well as symbols of totalitarianism and state terror by several countries that were formerly either members of or occupied by the Soviet Union. Accordingly, Latvia, Lithuania, Hungary and Ukraine have banned the symbol among others deemed to be symbols of totalitarian political ideologies and the Soviet Union or its republics. In Poland, the Parliament passed in 2009 a ban that referred generally to "fascist, communist or other totalitarian symbols", while not specifying any of them. Following a constitutional complaint, it has been abolished by the Constitutional Tribunal as contrary to articles in the Constitution of Poland guaranteeing the freedom of speech. A similar law was considered in Estonia, but eventually failed in a parliamentary committee due to its conflict with freedoms guaranteed by the constitution of Estonia.

The European Court of Human Rights has ruled, in a similar manner, against the laws that ban political symbols, which were deemed to be in clear opposition with basic human rights, such as freedom of speech, confirmed again in 2011 in case Fratanolo v. Hungary. The decision has been compared to the legislation concerning the symbols of Nazism, which continue to be banned in several European Union member states, including Germany and France.

There have been calls for an EU-wide ban on both Soviet and Nazi symbols, notably by politicians from Lithuania, Estonia, the Czech Republic, Hungary and Slovakia. The European Commissioner for Justice, Franco Frattini, felt it "might not be appropriate" to include communist symbols in the context of discussions on xenophobia and anti-Semitism.

In 2003, Hungarian politician Attila Vajnai was arrested, handcuffed and fined for wearing a red star on his lapel during a demonstration. He appealed his sentence to the European Court of Human Rights, which decided that the ban was a violation of the freedom of expression, calling the Hungarian ban "indiscriminate" and "too broad".

In Slovenia, the red star was historically associated with the resistance movement that fought against fascist occupation in World War II, but was also later a state symbol of Yugoslavia during the dictatorship of Josip Broz Tito. On 21 March 2011, Slovenia issued a two-euro commemorative coin to mark the 100th anniversary of the birth of Franc Rozman, a partisan commander, featuring a large star that represented a red star. This led to criticism from the Slovenian democratic parties without a communist history.

== Red Stars that are not five-pointed ==
Emblems and flags where the red stars displayed are not five-pointed are much rarer. These include the following:

Three-pointed red star in the flag of the International Brigades.

Four-pointed red star outlined in white in the flag of Aruba.

Six-pointed red stars outlined in green in the flag of Burundi.

Six-pointed red stars in the flag of Chicago.

Eight-pointed red star in the Naval Ensign of Singapore.

Emblem of Magen David Adom, the Israeli national aid society.

== See also ==
- Five-pointed star
- Red flag (⚑)
- Hammer and sickle (☭)
- Red triangle (▼)
- Communist symbolism
- Star and crescent
- Star of Bethlehem
- Hollywood Walk of Fame
- Red Star Belgrade
- FC Red Star Saint-Ouen
- FK Velež Mostar
- Flags of the Ottoman Empire
- Waasland-Beveren
- Pancho Villa Expedition, when American military aircraft used a red star insignia (1916–17)
- Lone Star Flag
- Red Star Banner
