= Pirnaer Ruderverein 1872 =

Coordinates: 50°57′51.1″N 13°55′55.72″E

Pirnaer Ruderverein 1872 e.V.
- Coat of arms

- Burgee

- Emblem

- Ensign
- Full name: Pirnaer Ruderverein 1872 e.V.
- Nickname: Red-Yellows
- Short name: PRV 1872, DRV-ID 12204
- Founded: 7 September 1872; 153 years ago 1992; 33 years ago
- Dissolved: 1945; 80 years ago
- Location: Pirna, Germany
- Registered association (Germany) ≈ 300 members
- President: Johannes Zeibig + The Hon. Siegfried Hanus
- Focus: 1. Rowing 2. Dragon boat 3. Cross-country skiing travels 4. Cardio fitness for legs and arms with stomach (Gym) 4. Swimming
- Website: Official website

The Pirna Rowing Club 1872 (Pirnaer Ruderverein 1872), from Pirna (Germany) is the first and oldest rowing club in the Freestate of Saxony, founded in 1872 and reshaped in 1991. One of the best known is the rower Peggy Waleska, who won 2 World Championships and one silver medal on the Olympics, and the rower Dieter Schubert, who won 2 times Olympic gold, 2 World- championships and 3 European championships. Sybille Reinhardt won the Olympic gold during the competitions Rowing at the 1980 Summer Olympics. During the time of the German Democratic Republic their names were: Betriebssportgemeinschaft Kommunales Wirtschaftsunternehmen (BSG KWU) Pirna, BSG Einheit Pirna, BSG Fortschritt Pirna and SV Fortschritt Pirna.

== History ==
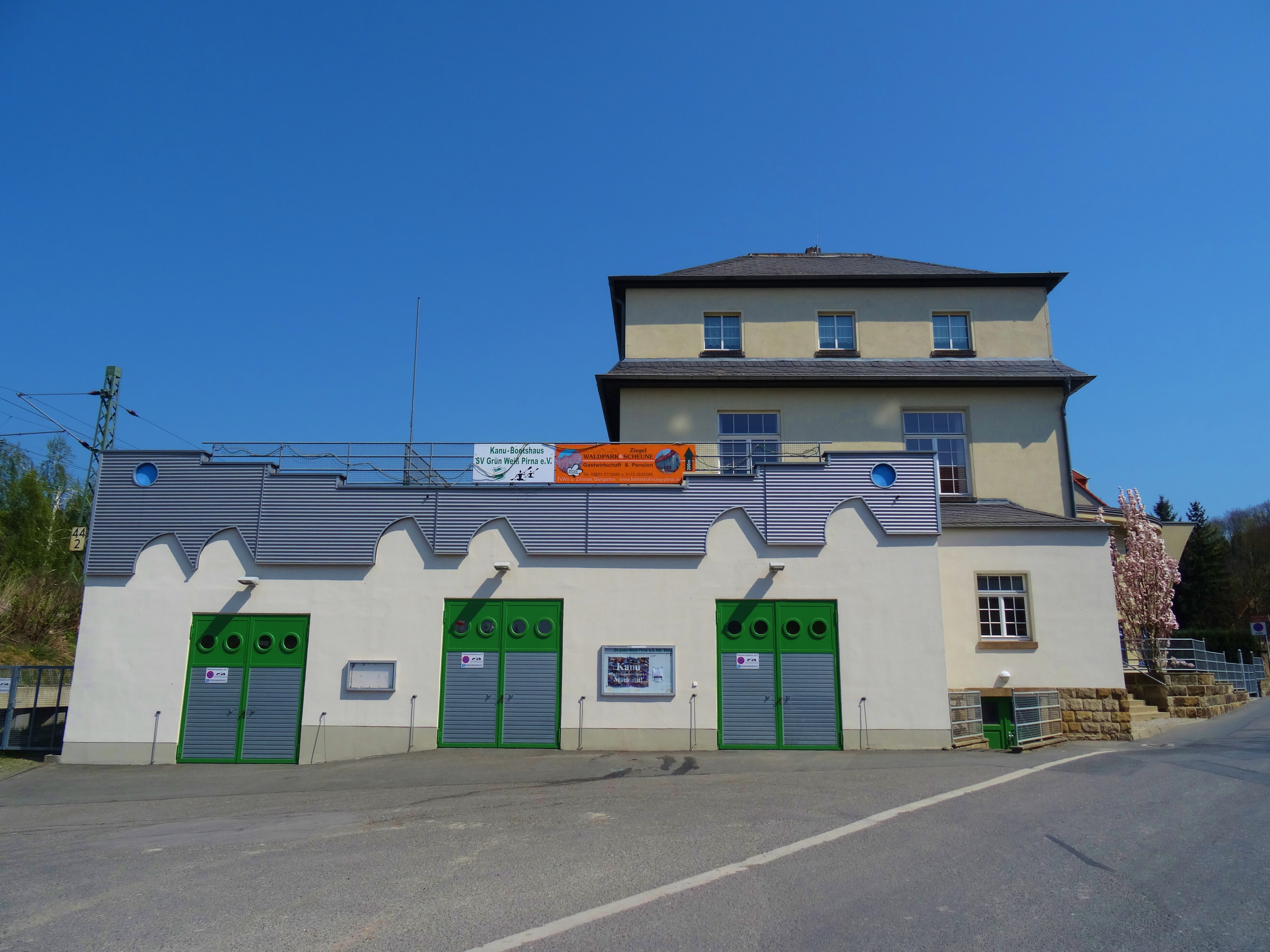
The former building of the Ruderclub Pirna 1921.

- On December 3, 1893: Clara Zetkin spoke there in the restaurant about women and militarism. On May 9, 1975, the Demokratischer Frauenbund Deutschlands installed a plaque, to remember her being there.
- On Nov. 4th, 1921, due to the political views inside and resulting troubles, the Ruderclub Pirna has been founded by about half of the former members of the PRV 1872.
- In 1945, the club was dissolved and they had no rowing boats. Those boats had been used for escapes to West Germany. After the WW2, they had only one boat.
- 2016, they got more space for the training centre, for 500,000 €, after the floods of 2002 and 2013.

=== Used ensigns ===
The ensign of Einheit was used due to the financial pressure. As PRV 1872 they would have had no money otherwise by the Sportvereinigung in the Socialist market economy. The advantage was to have no costs, but with accomplished inspections inclusive accountability reports. The BSG KWU Pirna was an old-fashioned name of the BSG Einheit Pirna in the same organization.

The colors are

Scarlet RGBA:ff0000ff, White RGBA:ffffff, Aureolin RGBA:ffff00ff
1872-1949

As BSG Einheit Pirna 1949-1957

As BSG Fortschritt Pirna 1957-1989 (by union of BSG Einheit and BSG Motor Pirna)

=== Kits ===
current	90ers-MM	1872-1957

== Various ==
- They offer an integration training for disabled persons with malfunctions of the body or mental problems.
- Every year they have a swimming competition in Pirna and a travel to a cross-country skiing camp, in Eastern Europe or Ore Mountains.

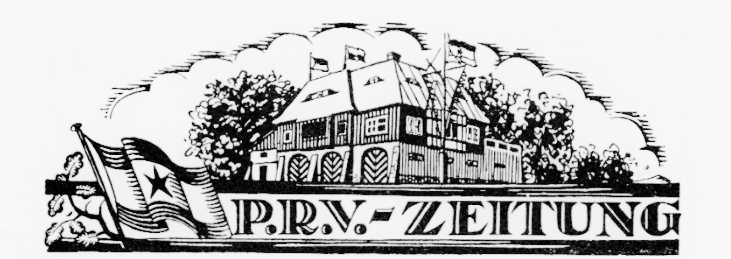

== Newspaper ==
On Feb. 1st, 1892, the newspaper "PRV Zeitung" has been founded and existed until around 1945. Their newspaper has the name "Dolle" (engl.: Oarlock) for one publishing per quarter.

== Titles ==
You have a lot of titles you cannot read in their non completely told history. Especially these titles from their extremely hard-trained GDR-era as Einheit or Fortschritt Pirna. They had to give away their best talents to an Olympiastützpunkt (federal point for the adult sports elite) all the time.

- Baltic Cup (Rowing): 2018 Johanna Sinkewitz 2x gold over 500m and 2000m (women's single scull U 19/ A)
- World Rowing Junior Championships: 2019 Johanna Sinkewitz 1x silver (2000m women's quad scull U 19/ A)
- German junior champions: 2019 Johanna Sinkewitz (women's quad scull U 19/ A); 2019 Franz Werner (men's quad scull U 23/ Senior B)
- Champions of Saxony and Thuringia in Eilenburg 2019: 17x gold
- Lake Velence Fisa World Rowing Masters 2019: 7x Gold; 18x Silver; 10x Bronze (all as amateurs)
- Rowing Championship of Saxony (8+): 2011; 2012; 2014
- Rowing Bundesliga of Germany (8+): Third place 2014
- Order of Merit of the Federal Republic of Germany with ribbon 2009: Siegfried Hanus
- Part of the best sports town of Germany: 2009

== See also ==
- Sports associations (East Germany)
- German Olympic Sports Confederation
