= Flag of the Transcaucasian Socialist Federative Soviet Republic =

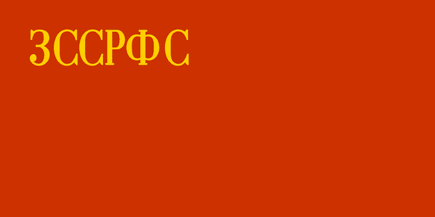
Flag of the TSFSR from 1922 to 1925

Flag of the TSFSR from 1925 to 1936

The Flag of the Transcaucasian Socialist Federative Soviet Republic (Russian: Флаг Закавка́зской СФСР, Flag Zakavkázskoj SFSR) was adopted by the Transcaucasian Socialist Federative Soviet Republic in 1925. It consists of a red star bordered by gold in the canton, surrounded by a semicircle with the Cyrillic characters "ЗСФСР" in gold.

Prior to 1925, the flag was red with the Cyrillic characters ЗССРФС in gold.
