= Coat of arms of Georgia =

Versions
- Escutcheon
- Armiger: Georgia (greater coat of arms); Mikheil Kavelashvili, President of Georgia (lesser coat of arms)
- Adopted: 1 October 2004 (latest rendition)
- Crest: Iverian (Georgian) crown Or
- Shield: Purpure, a knight mounted on a steed argent, brandishing a lance of the same tipped with a cross Or, Saint George nimbed Or, slaying a dragon argent.
- Supporters: two lions rampant Or
- Compartment: Stylized grape vine ornament Or
- Motto: ძალა ერთობაშია Dzala Ertobashia "Strength is in Unity"

The coat of arms of Georgia is one of the national symbols of Georgia. The coat of arms is partially based on the medieval arms of the Georgian royal house and features Saint George, the traditional patron saint of Georgia. In addition to St. George, the original proposal included additional heraldic elements found on the royal seal, such as the seamless robe of Jesus, but this was deemed excessively religious and was not incorporated into the final version.

== Official description ==
Georgian law describes the coat of arms as follows:

The State coat of arms of Georgia is an heraldic shield, on its pupure field is depicted a silver rider on a silver horse and with a silver spear ending with a golden cross, Saint George with a golden halo, striking a silver dragon. The shield is crowned with the Iverian (Georgian) crown. The supporters are two golden lions, standing on a compartment of stylized grape vine ornament. The compartment is embellished with a silver-purple motto ribbon (face is silver, back is purple). On the silver field of the ribbon with black Mkhedruli letters is written the motto "ძალა ერთობაშია" ("Strength is in unity"). On the ribbon, in the beginning and the end of the inscription, are depicted purpure heraldic crosses.

Although the shield is officially described as purpure, it is often depicted as red.

== Former coats of arms ==
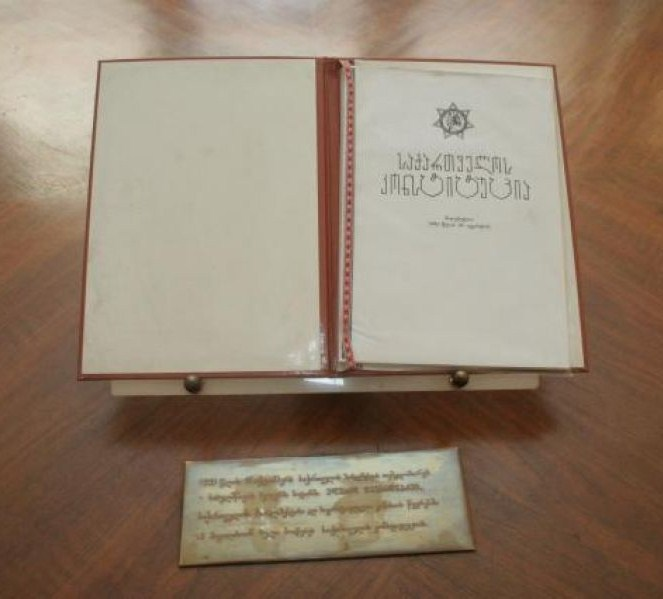
The 1990–2004 coat of arms on the Georgian constitution

- 1918–1921 and 1991–2004:

This coat of arms was in use by the Democratic Republic of Georgia throughout its existence in 1918–1921. Though the use of Saint George as Georgia's patron saint was by then a long tradition, there were some discussions about other possibilities, the major one being Amiran, as the symbol of Georgia's fight for freedom from the Russian Empire. However, a decision was then made in favor of Saint George. Restored in a different guise in 1991, this coat of arms was replaced by the current one in 2004. Strictly speaking, this arms is a national emblem, as unlike the current arms, it does not follow heraldic rules.

- 1801–1917:

Before 1917, when Georgia was part of the Russian Empire, the Georgian coat of arms appeared on the Greater Coat of Arms of the Russian Empire, as part of the coat of arms of Caucasus. It showed then as the center inescutcheon, and read as follows:

Or, with an image of Saint George Martyr the Victorious in complete armour Azur with a cross on his breast, with a flying cloak Gules, riding a horse Sable in full gallop, the latter covered with a horse cloth Gules, fringed Or, trampling upon a crawling serpent Vert, winged Sable, eyed and tongued Gules, whose head is pierced by the saint's spear Gules.

- Before 1801:

Coats of arms were mostly those of the Bagrationi, who claimed to have King David among their ancestors, and included such elements as King David's lyra and sling, or the Holy Tunic.

Greater coat of arms of the Georgian royal house

Coat of arms of Kingdom of Kartli-Kakheti (1762–1801)

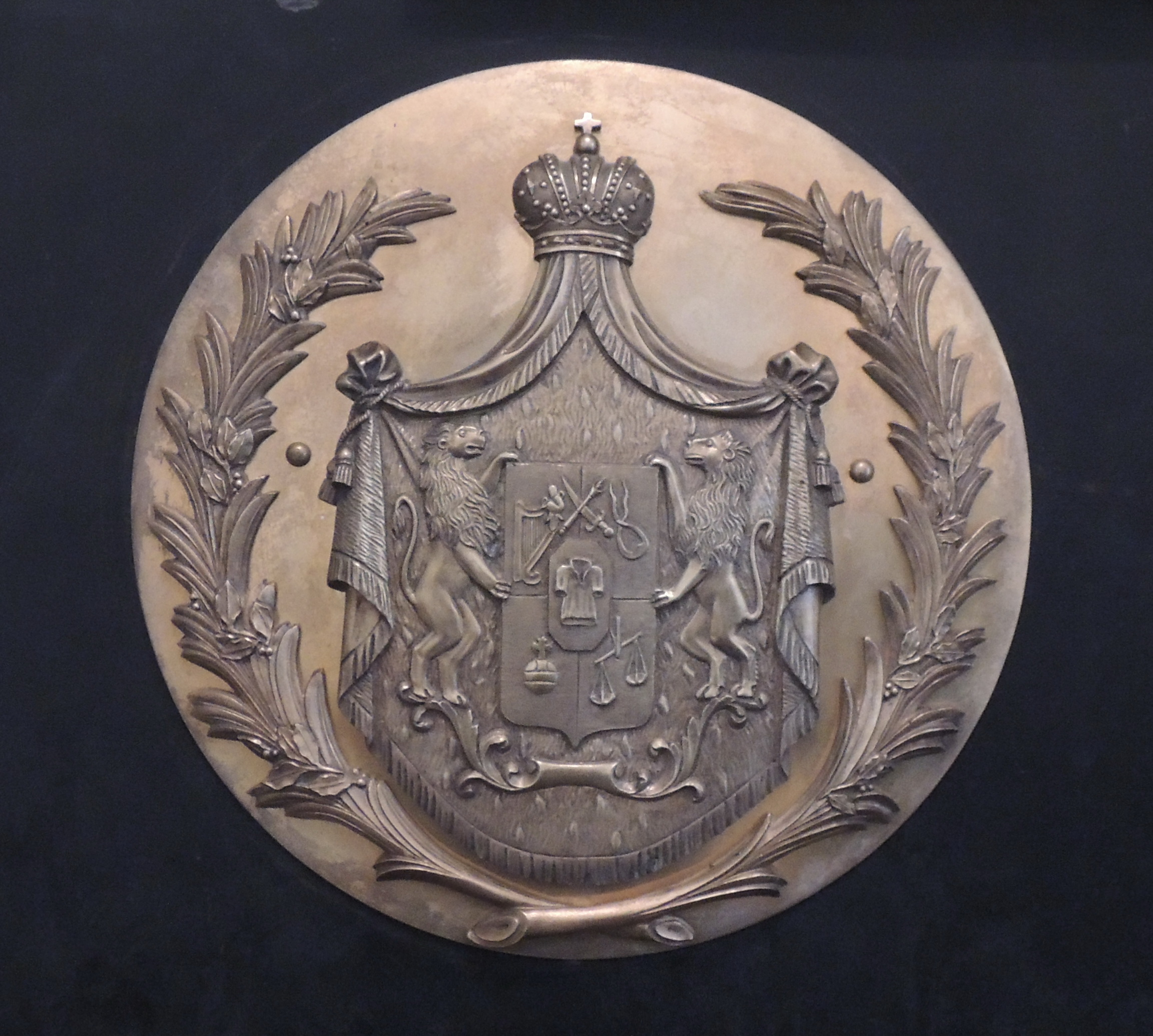
An 1807 metalwork of the Georgian royal coat of arms

Emblem used by the First Republic (1918–1921)

Coat of arms of the Republic of Georgia (1990–2004)

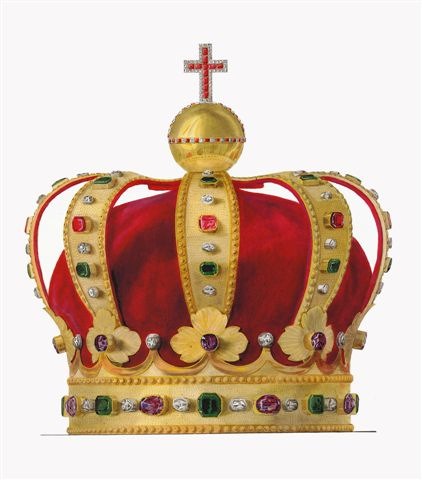
The lost crown of King George XII, painted by Fedor Solntsev from the Kremlin Museum

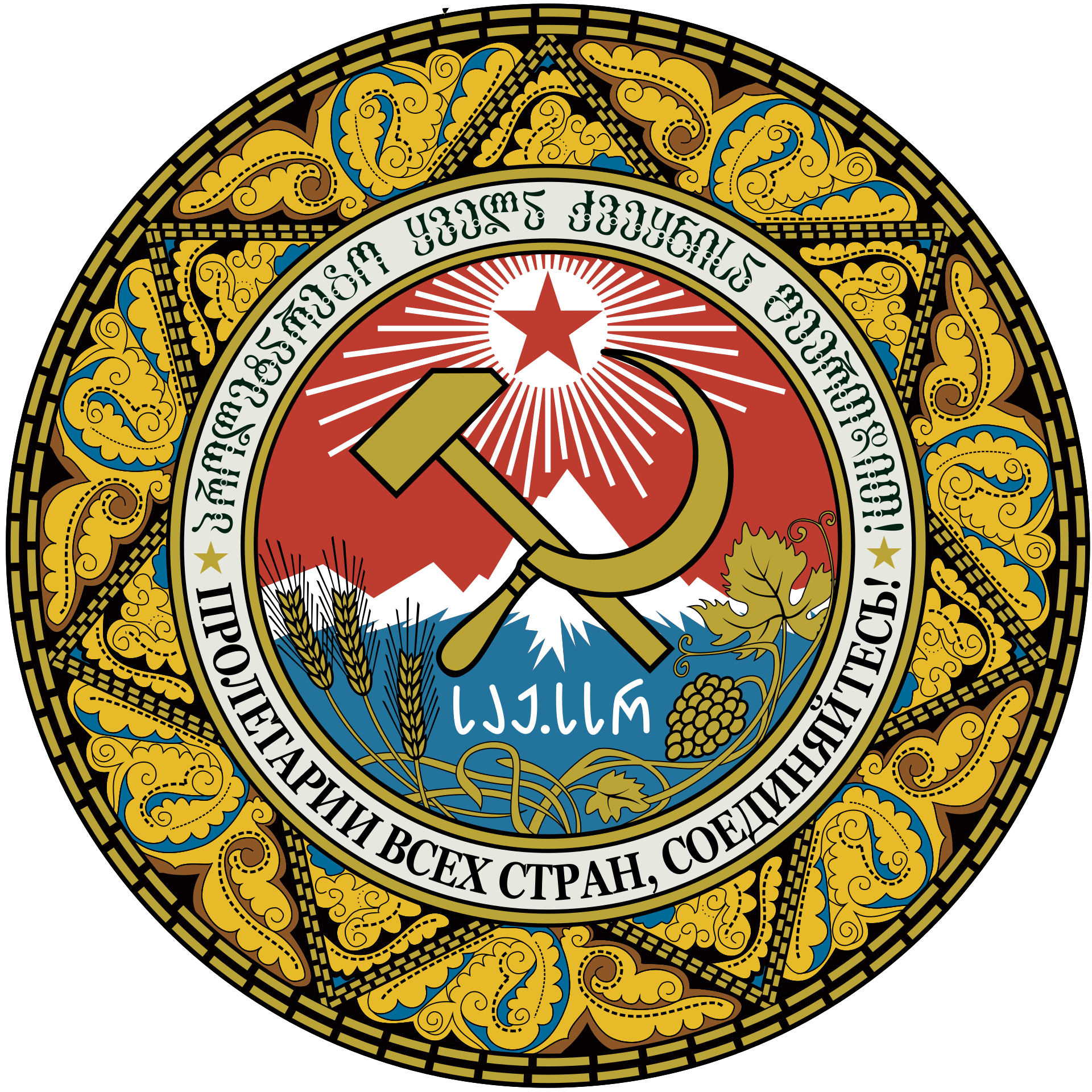
Emblem of the Georgian SSR

== See also ==
- Flag of Georgia (country)
- Coat of arms of the Bagrationi dynasty
- Pogoń Ruska coat of arms
- Emblem of the Georgian Soviet Socialist Republic
- Armorial of Georgia
