= Emblem of the Georgian Soviet Socialist Republic =

Versions
- Emblem used from 11 December 1990 to 26 December 1991.
- Armiger: Georgian Soviet Socialist Republic
- Adopted: 20 May 1921; 11 December 1990
- Motto: პროლეტარებო ყველა ქვეყნისა, შეერთდით! (Georgian) Пролетарии всех стран, соединяйтесь! (Russian) "Workers of the world, unite!"

The coat of arms of the Georgian Soviet Socialist Republic was adopted on 20 May 1921 by the government of the Georgian Soviet Socialist Republic. The coat of arms is loosely based on the coat of arms of the Soviet Union. It shows symbols of agriculture (grapes and wheat). The red star rising above the Caucasus stands for the future of the Georgian nation, and the hammer and sickle for the victory of Communism and the "world-wide socialist community of states".

The banner bears the Soviet Union state motto ("Workers of the world, unite!") in both the Georgian and Russian languages. In Georgian, it is "პროლეტარებო ყველა ქვეყნისა, შეერთდით!" (transliterated: "P’rolet’arebo q’vela kveq’nisa, sheertdit!").

The Abkhaz Autonomous Soviet Socialist Republic and the Adjar Autonomous Soviet Socialist Republic used variants of this coat of arms (in the Abkhaz case, with the name of the republic and the motto also in Abkhaz).

A later version in 1981 introduced an inscription reading "საქ.სსრ" (Georgian abbreviation for "Georgian Soviet Socialist Republic") in the centre of the field.

This coat of arms was replaced by a new one on December 11, 1990, and again on 2005.

== History ==
=== First revision ===
The Revolutionary Committee of the SSR of Georgia twice, at its meetings, on March 8 and May 15, 1921, raised the question of the coat of arms. On May 20, 1921, the Revolutionary Committee of the SSR adopted a decree "On the arms and flag of the Socialist Soviet Republic of Georgia":

In view of the establishment, since February 25, 1921, of Soviet power, that is, the dictatorship of the working people, the Revolutionary Committee of the Socialist Soviet Republic of Georgia declares all emblems of the bourgeois system, such as the tricolor flag and the old coat of arms, to be abolished forever and decides: ....2. To approve the coat of arms of the Socialist Soviet Republic of Georgia as follows: a round red field, in the upper part of which there is a luminous five-pointed star with rays extending all over the field; beneath - a snowy ridge of blue and violet, on the right side - golden bread ears and on the left - golden vines with grape clusters. The ends of ears and vines are intertwined at the base of the ridge, in the lower part of the field. Most of the middle of the field is occupied by images of the golden sickle and hammer, which abut above the luminous star, below - to the tops of the ridge, and on the sides - into the ears and vines. Around the field there is an inscription in three languages - Georgian, Russian and French: "Proletarians of all countries, unite!". The coat of arms is bordered with a pattern of ornaments in the Georgian style.

— On the arms and flag of the Socialist Soviet Republic of Georgia (1921)

The coat of arms is reconfirmed in the Constitution of the Georgian SSR, adopted by the Fourth All-Georgian Congress of Soviets of Workers, Peasants' and Red Army Deputies in 1927, the coat of arms is described in Article 112:

The coat of arms of the Socialist Soviet Republic of Georgia consists of a round red halo. in the upper part of which is depicted a luminous five-pointed star with rays extending across the field, below - a snowy ridge of blue color; on the right side there are golden ears and on the left are golden vines with grape bunches. The ends of ears and vines are loosely bounded at the base of the ridge, in the lower part of the field. Most of the middle is occupied by images of the golden sickle and hammer, which abut against the top - in the luminous star, below - in the top of the ridge, and on the sides - in the ears and vines. Around the field there is an inscription in three languages - Georgian, Russian and French: "Proletarians of all countries, unite". The coat of arms is bordered with a pattern of ornaments in the Georgian style.

— Constitution of the Georgian SSR (1927), Article 112

=== Second revision ===
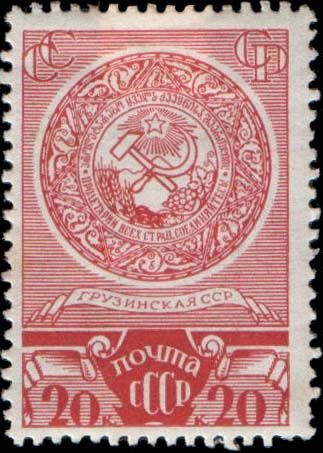
Emblem of the Georgian SSR on a 1937 postage stamp

In the opinion of the commission set up in 1937 under the Presidium of the Supreme Soviet of the USSR, it was necessary to add the name of the republic to the coat of arms of the Georgian SSR, to introduce a red five-pointed star, and to represent citrus and tea between the ears and grapevines. Apparently, it was then recommended to remove from the coat of arms the motto "Proletarians of all countries, unite!" In French.

According to V. Potseluev's book Emblems of the USSR, on February 13, 1937, the Extraordinary VIII Congress of Soviets of the Georgian SSR adopted a new Constitution of the Georgian SSR, in which the arms were described as follows:

The State Emblem of the Georgian SSR consists of from the round red field, in the upper part of which is depicted a luminous five-pointed star with rays extending all over the field, below - a blue snow ridge, on the right side - golden ears and on the left - golden vines with grape clusters. The vines are intertwined at the bottom of the ridge at the bottom of the field, most of the middle are the images of the golden sickle and hammer, which abut: at the top - in a luminous star, at the bottom - at the top of the ridge, and at the sides in ears and vines. two languages - Georgian and Russian: "Proletarians of all countries, unite!" The coat of arms is surrounded with a pattern of ornaments in Georgian style.

— Constitution of the Georgian SSR (1937), Article 159

On February 6, 1956, the Decree of the Presidium of the Supreme Council of the Georgian SSR approved the "Regulations on the State Emblem of the Georgian SSR".

=== Third revision ===
On April 15, 1978, the Supreme Soviet of the Georgian SSR adopted a new Constitution of the Georgian SSR.

On June 18, 1981, in a new version of the "Regulations on the State Emblem of the Georgian SSR", the abbreviation "GSSR" was added to the emblem.

== Gallery ==
Emblem of the Socialist Soviet Republic of Georgia (1921-1937)

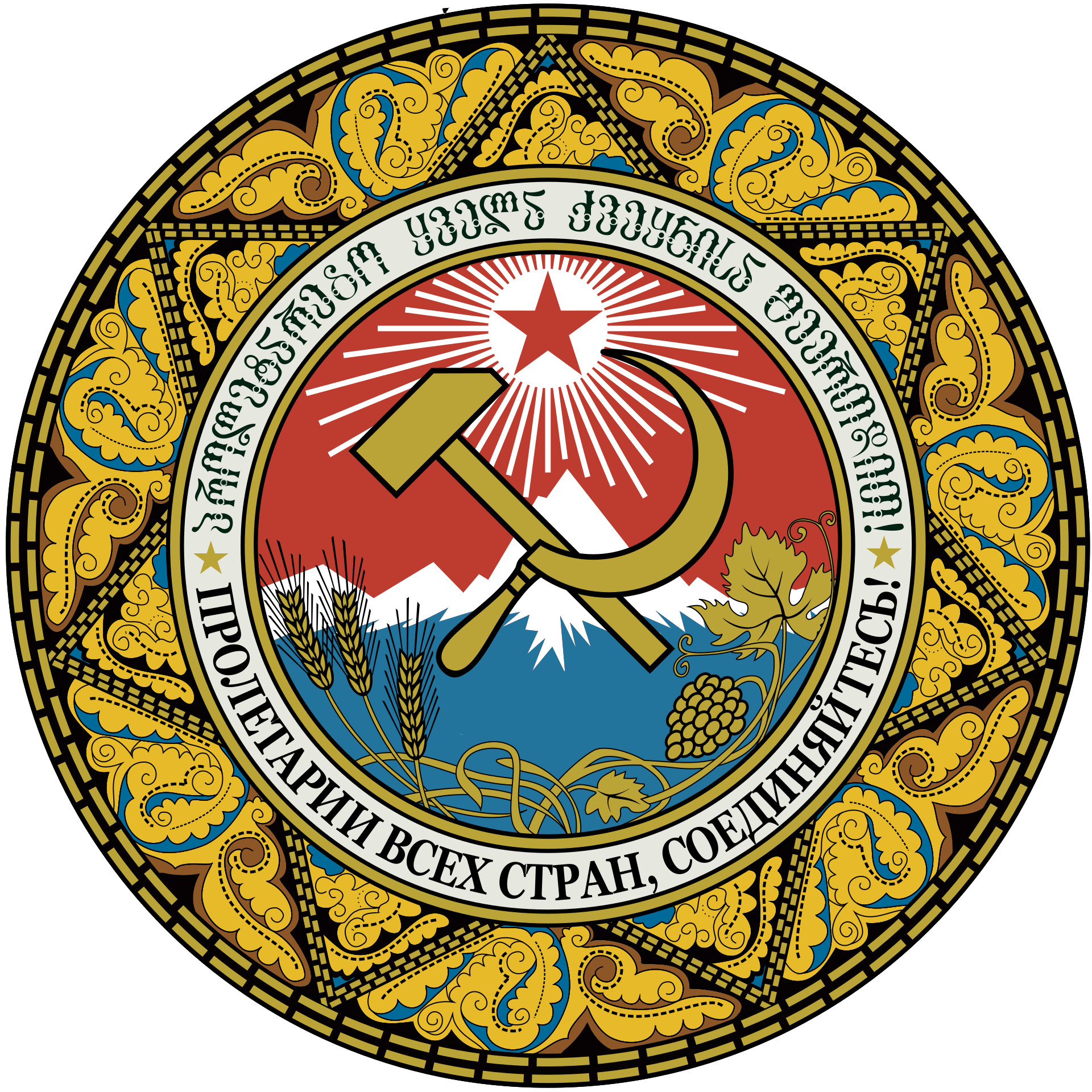
Emblem of the Georgian SSR from 1937-1981.

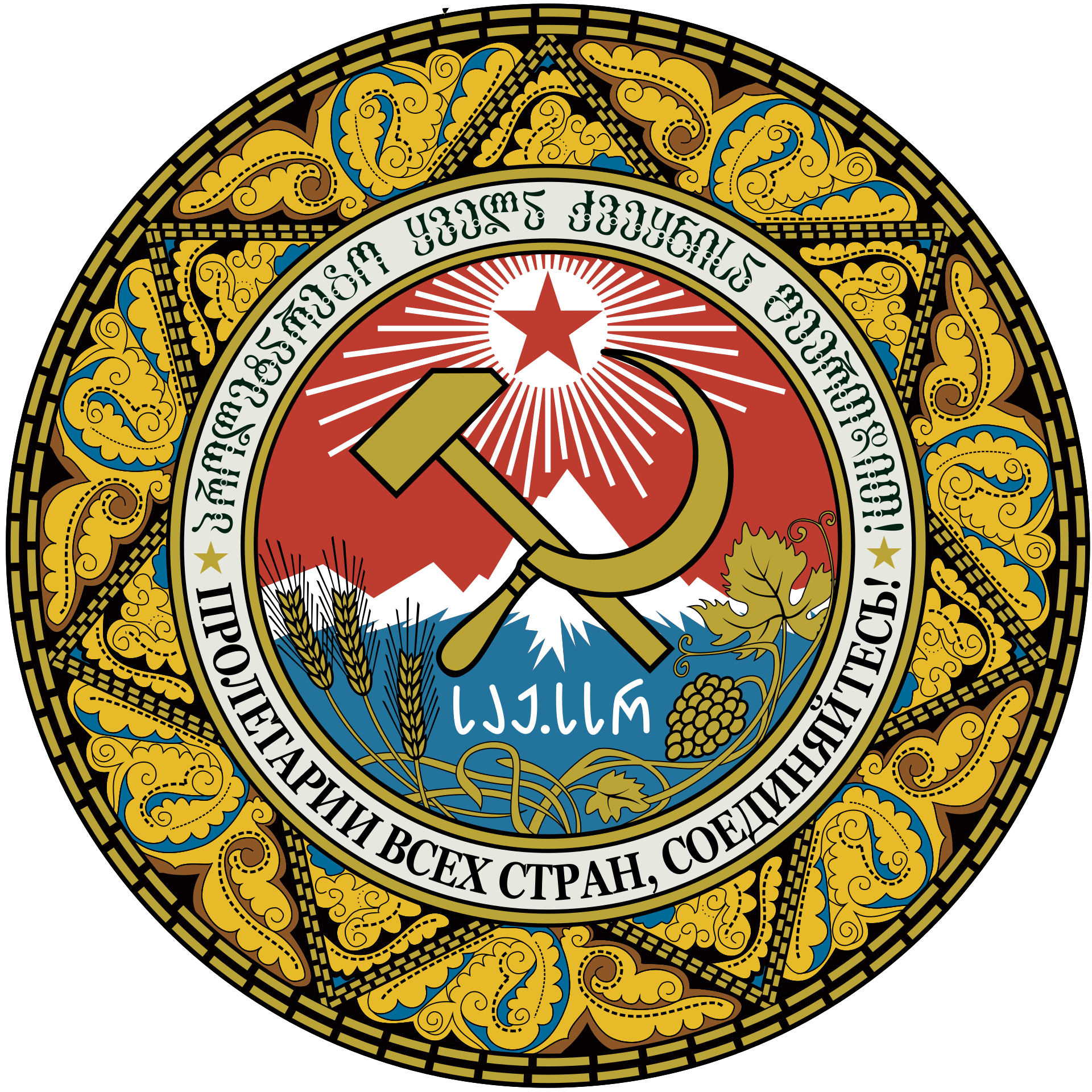
Emblem of the Georgian SSR.

== See also ==
- Coat of arms of Georgia
- Emblems of the Soviet Republics
