= Anatol Tsitou =

Belarusian historian and heraldist (1947–2021)

- Анатоль Цітоў
- Born: November 27, 1947; Dresden, Soviet Occupation Zone
- Died: January 5, 2021 (aged 73)
- Resting place: Čyžoŭka cemetery
- Education: Belarusian State University
- Known for: Research on Belarusian heraldry

Anatol Tsitou (Belarusian: Анатоль Цітоў, Russian: Анатолий Титов, also Anatol Citoŭ 27 November 1947 - 5 January 2021) was a Belarusian historian and heraldist, known for his research of Belarusian heraldry.

== Biography ==
Tsitou was born in Dresden, Soviet occupation zone in Germany.

He graduated from the History faculty of the Belarusian State University and in 1975 started his career as researcher at the Central State Historical Archives of the Belarusian SSR where he subsequently became senior palaeographer.

Since 1983 he taught at the Belarusian Institute of Culture and later at the Belarusian State University. In 1994 he became senior researcher at the Belarusian Documentology and Archives Research Institute.

Throughout his career, Tsitou researched and reconstructed the earliest coats of arms of Belarusian settlements. His work of rediscovering the Belarusian heraldic tradition originating from the time of the Grand Duchy of Lithuania was not always welcomed by the Soviet authorities. In his first book about the coats of arms of Belarusian towns (1983), Tsitou collected all the known by then urban emblems. It was illustrated by an artist Jauhien Kulik who based this work on medieval seals. None of 1,000 copies of the book reached the state-controlled distribution; almost all copies rotted away in a warehouse. In the independent Belarus after 1991, virtually all Tsitou's reconstructions were accepted for the coats of arms of the country's settlements.

In early 1990s, Tsitou was member of a state commission developing the etalon of the white-red-white state flag of Belarus.

== Selected works ==
=== Heraldry ===
- Гербы беларускіх гарадоў [Coats of Arms of Belarusian Cities], 1983
- Гарадская геральдыка Беларусі [Urban Heraldry of Belarus], 1989
- Наш сімвал — Пагоня [Our Symbol, the Pahonia], 1993
- Пячаткі старажытнай Беларусі [Seals of Ancient Belarus], 1993
- Геральдыка беларускіх местаў (XVI — пачатак XX ст.) [Heraldry of Belarusian Cities, 16th to early 20th centuries], 1998
- Сфагістыка і геральдыка Беларусі [Sigillography and Heraldry of Belarus], 1999
- Геральдыка Беларусі [Heraldry of Belarus], 2010
- Гербоўнік беларускіх гарадоў [Armorial of Belarusian Cities], 2015

=== Other topics ===
- Краіна майстроў. Рамесныя цэхі Беларусі: 16 - канец 18 ст. [The Land of Craftsmen. Craft guilds in Belarus: 16th century - end of 18th century], 2013
- Беларусь на сямі рубяжах [Belarus at Seven Borders] - with Leu Kazlou, 1993
- Шляхамі Францыска Скарыны [Following the Path of Frantsishak Skaryna], 2017

== See also ==
- Belarusian heraldry

== Links ==
- Books by Anatol Tsitou at knihi.com
- Books by Anatol Tsitou at kamunikat.org
