= National symbols of Belarus =

Following the independence of Belarus from the Soviet Union, the country resurrected national symbols that were briefly used before the Soviet era. These included a flag of red and white stripes and a coat of arms derived from the coat of arms of Lithuania, which consisted of a charging knight on horseback. These national symbols were replaced by Soviet-era symbols in a disputed 1995 vote. Those two symbols, along with the national anthem, are the constitutionally defined national symbols of Belarus.

== Law ==
In the 1994 Constitution of Belarus, Article 19 lists the official symbols of the country. Article 19 reads:

The symbols of the Republic of Belarus as a sovereign state shall be its national flag, national emblem and national anthem.

Each national symbol is further defined by its respective laws. Uses of the national symbols are covered in the relevant law of each symbol.

== National flag ==
National flag

The national flag has been in use since June 7, 1995, one of two symbols adopted in the contested 1995 referendum. The main element of the flag is a red and green bicolour, then decorated with an ornament pattern at the hoist position. The current flag is a modification of the 1951 flag used while the country was a republic of the Soviet Union. In the Soviet version, a hammer and sickle were placed near the top-hoist corner and the ornament colours were inverted. Several flags used by government officials and agencies were based on the national flag.

Despite being replaced, the former flag of Belarus is used by those who oppose the current Belarusian President Alexander Lukashenko. The former flag consisted of a white background with a red horizontal stripe in the middle. It was used by the Belarusian Democratic Republic and immediately after independence from the Soviet Union in 1991.

== National emblem ==
National emblem

The other national symbol that was adopted following a contested 1995 referendum was the national emblem. The elements of the emblem include a ribbon in the colours of the national flag, a map of Belarus, wheatears and a red star. At the base of the ribbon, it says the country's official name in the Belarusian language. The emblem is an allusion to the one used by the Byelorussian SSR, designed by Ivan Dubasov in 1950. In the Soviet version, a hammer and sickle replaced the map of Belarus and the ribbon was all red. On the left and right ribbons, the Soviet motto Workers of the world, unite! appeared in the Belarusian and Russian languages.

The national emblem that was used at the time of the short-lived Belarusian Democratic Republic and post-Soviet independence was called the Pahonia, a variant of the coat of arms of Lithuania. On the base of a red shield, an armoured white knight is mounted on a silver horse, with a sword drawn and charging to the left. On the shield of the knight, a golden Patriarchal cross is displayed.

== National anthem ==
The only symbol that hasn't changed over during independence is the national anthem. Adopted during the Soviet era, "My Belarusy" was used provisionally until 2002. The only change that occurred was dropping the Soviet-era lyrics and choosing just to use the music, composed by Nieścier Sakałoŭski. On July 2, 2002, President Lukashenko issued a decree adopting new lyrics to the anthem, written by Uładzimier Karyzna. Klimkovič also wrote the lyrics to the Anthem of the Byelorussian SSR. Not only the lyrics were chosen, a protocol guide related to the national anthem was released by Lukashenko. The reason that was given for keeping Sakałoŭski's music was to keep the historic traditions of the country. While references to Lenin, the Communist Party of the Soviet Union and the idea of Soviet brotherhood were dropped, the general idea of a "friendship of peoples" still remains present. According to the Belarusian Government, once the national anthem was adopted, the long process to adopt the three national symbols of Belarus was completed.

== Historical symbols ==
=== White-red-white flag ===
Historical national flag of Belarus

Since the early 20th century, the Belarusian national liberation movement has been using a white-red-white flag. This flag was a state symbol of the Belarusian People's Republic since 1918 and the Republic of Belarus in 1991–1995. The original person behind the design of the flag is believed to have been Klawdziy Duzh-Dushewski before 1917 and this design is known in Belarusian as the byel-chyrvona-byely s'tsyah (Бел-чырвона-белы сьцяг, literally "white-red-white flag"). Red and white have traditionally been used in state heraldry of the Grand Duchy of Lithuania and the Polish–Lithuanian Commonwealth. The colours are also based on those of the coat of arms of Lithuania. There are several other theories explaining the flag's origin. One theory speaks of an allusion to the name of the country, White Ruthenia. Despite its popularity, the public display of the white-red-white flag is being prosecuted by the regime of Alexander Lukashenko.

=== Pahonia ===
Pahonia

Pahonia (Belarusian: Пагоня, romanized: Pahonia) is the historical Belarusian name for the coat of arms of Lithuania, which was also used by the Belarusian People's Republic as its official coat of arms since 1918 and the coat of arms of the Republic of Belarus in 1991–1995. Since the early 20th century, the Pahonia is widely used as the symbol of the Belarusian national liberation movement. After 1995, it became one of the symbols of the democratic opposition to the authoritarian president, Alexander Lukashenko. The symbol gained additional popularity during the 2020–2021 Belarusian protests. Pahonia is included in the official list of objects of the immaterial cultural and historical heritage of Belarus; however, persons are being persecuted for its public display.

== Unofficial symbols ==
Other than the national flag, anthem and emblem, Belarus has several unofficial symbols. The Cross of Saint Euphrosyne, a 12th-century relic which disappeared during the Second World War, is considered a spiritual symbol of Belarus. The European bison, commonly called the wisent, is seen as a symbol of Belarus and the Belavezha Forest. It is also featured on the symbols of Brest Oblast. Other widely known mascots of Belarus are stork and cornflower.

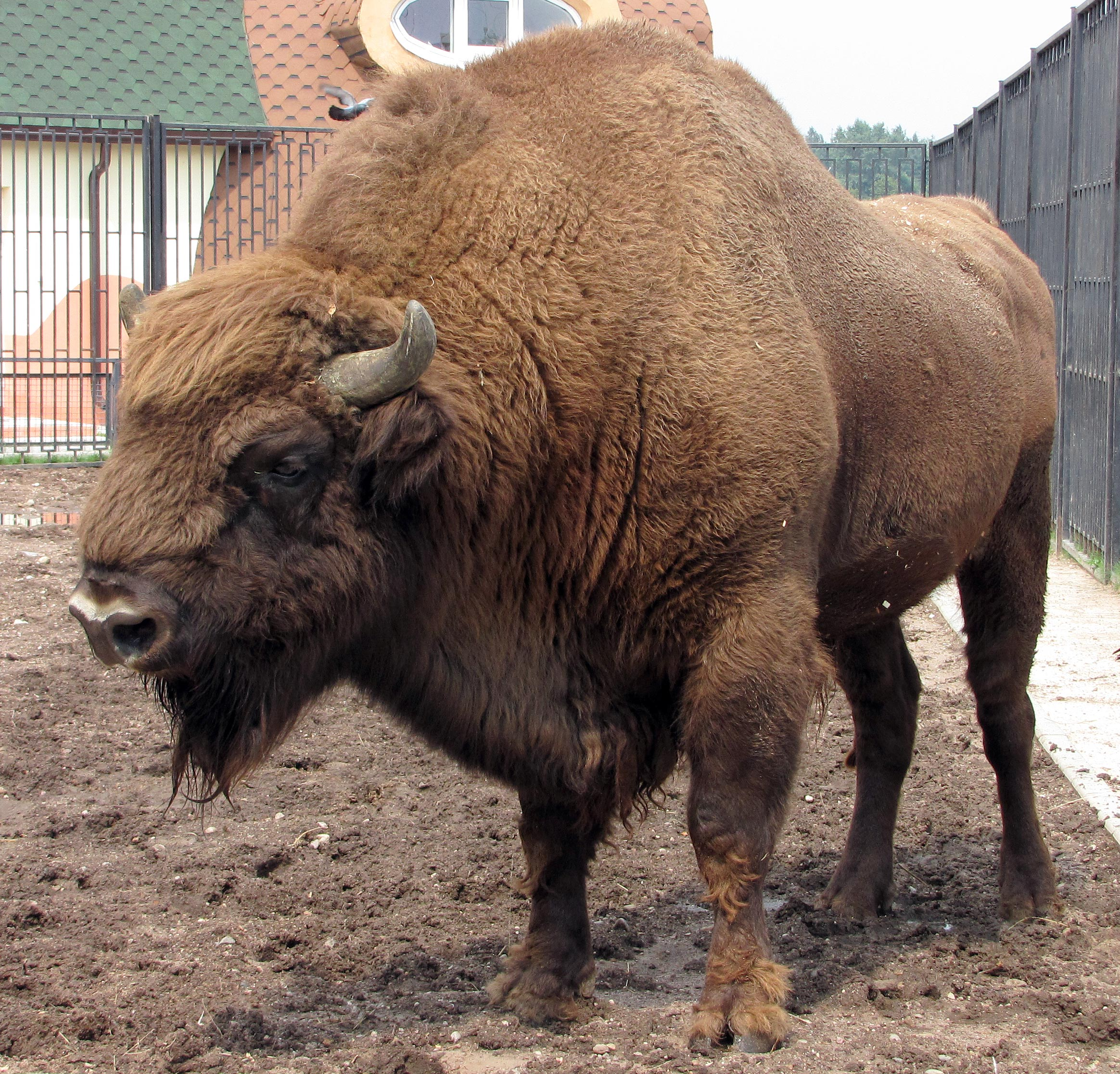
A male wisent in a Minsk zoo

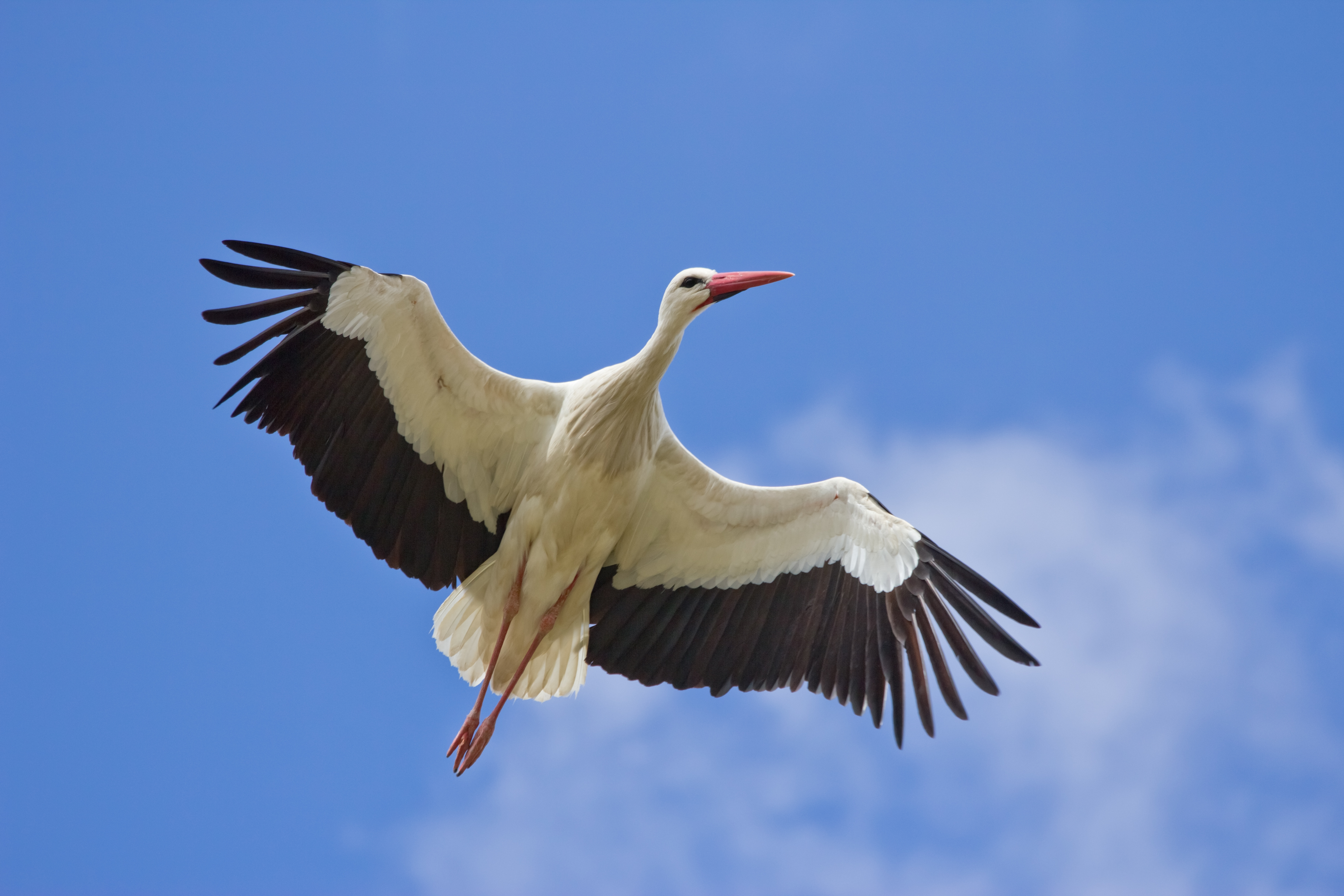
A white stork

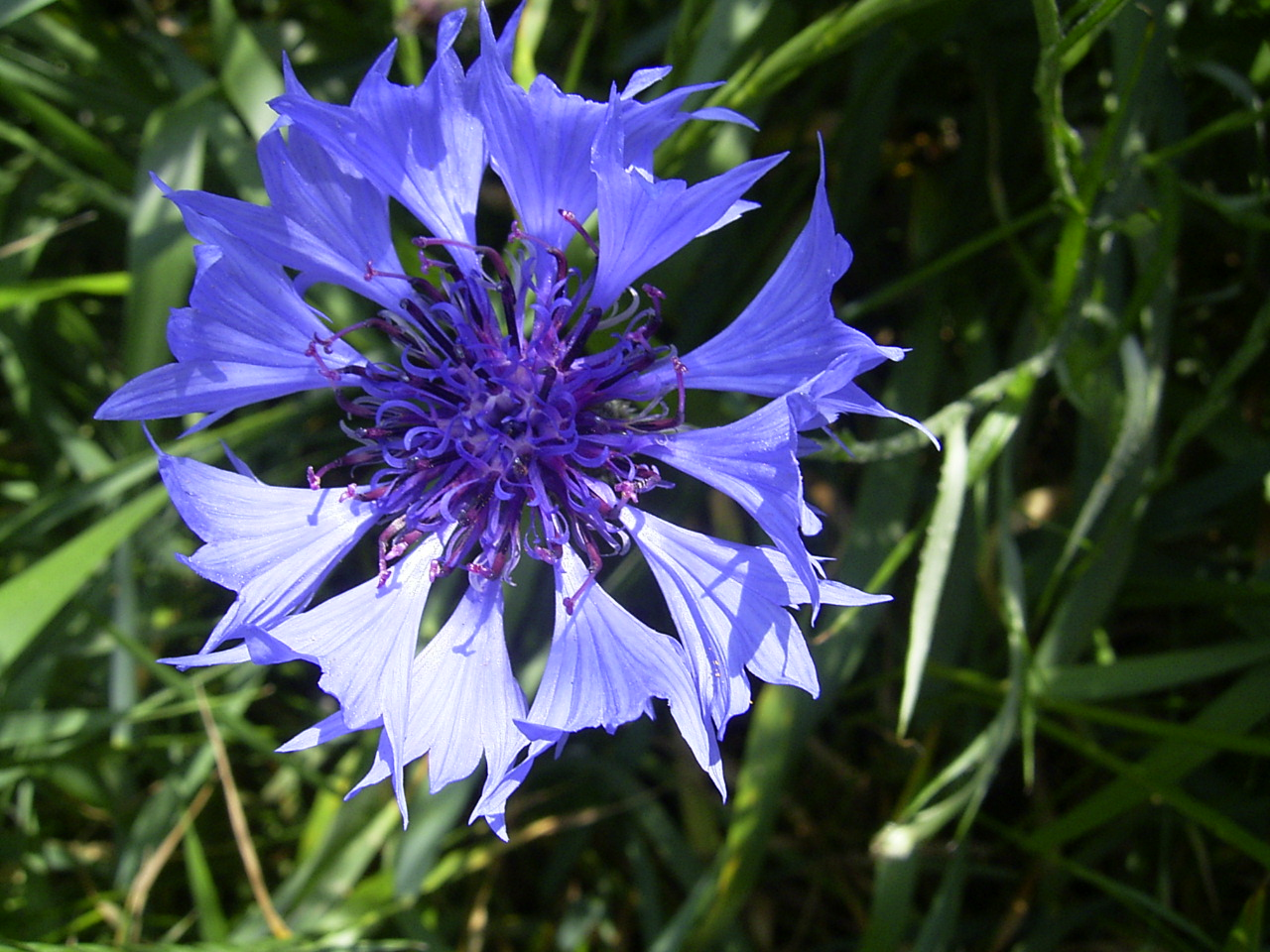
Cornflower

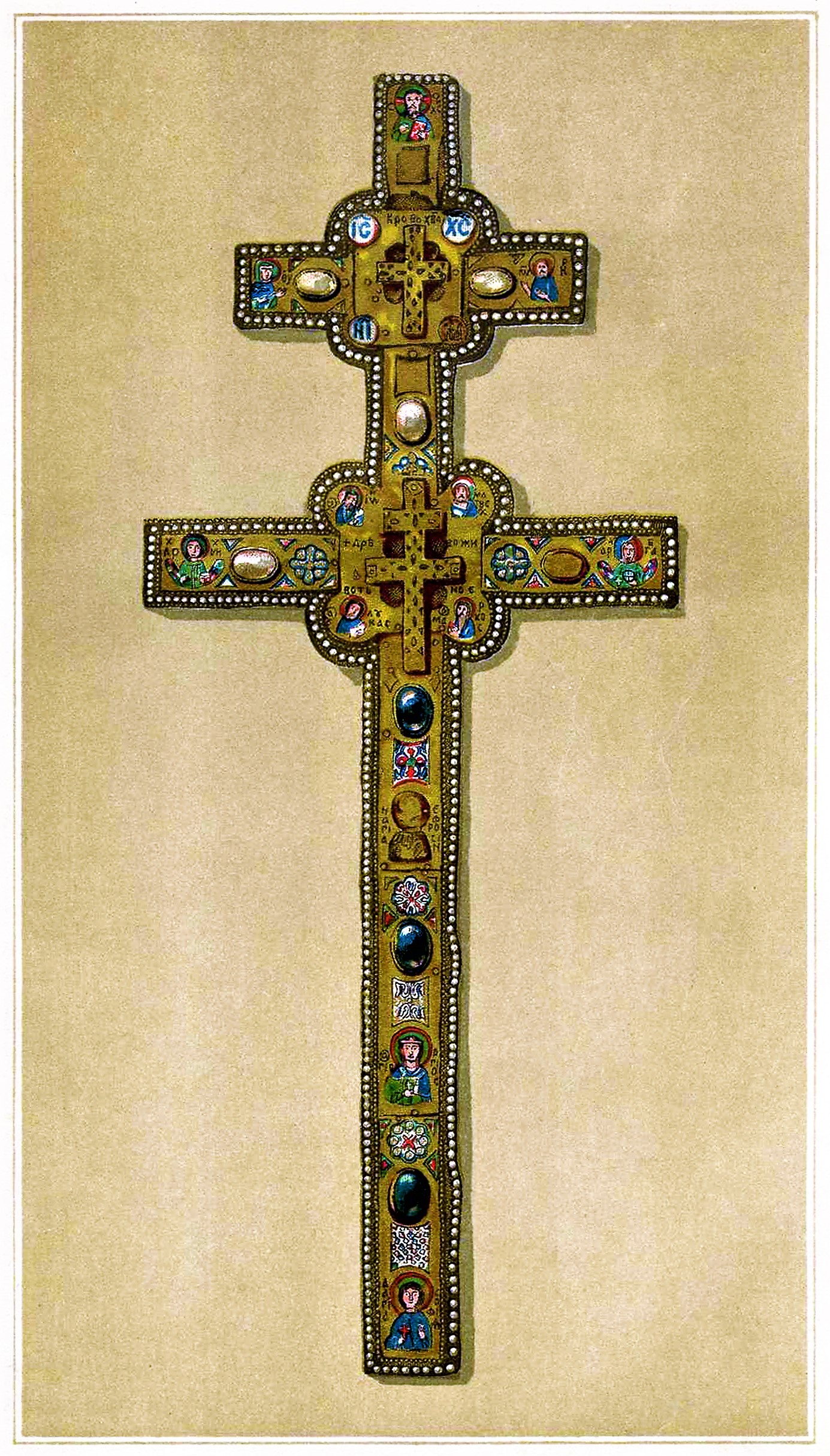
Cross of St. Euphrosyne

== See also ==
- List of flags of Belarus
- List of Belarusian coats of arms
- Belarusian heraldry
