= National emblem of Belarus =

State Emblem of the Republic of Belarus
- Armiger: Republic of Belarus
- Adopted: 1937 (Soviet design); 1995 (original design); 2012 (modified); 2020 (current design)
- Crest: Red star
- Supporters: Stalks of wheat, clover and flax
- Motto: Рэспубліка Беларусь (Belarusian) "Republic of Belarus"
- Earlier version
- Use: Coat of arms of Belarus from 1991 to 1995

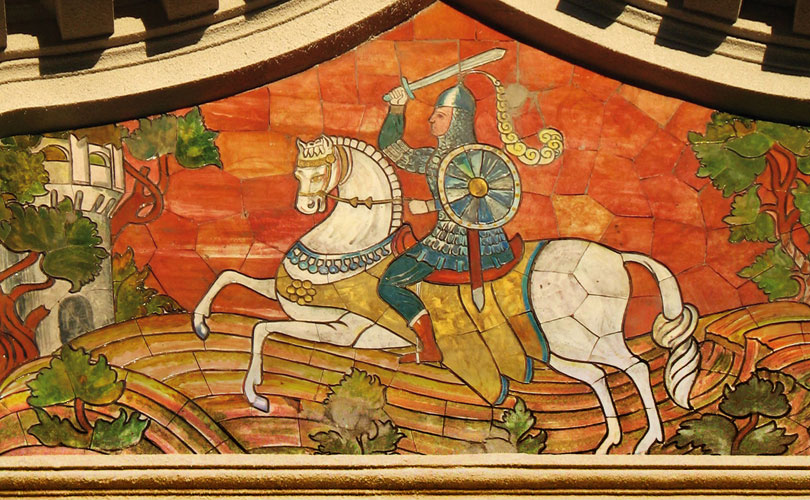
Pahonia on the building of the Vitebsk State Academy of Veterinary Medicine

The national emblem of Belarus features a ribbon in the colors of the national flag, a silhouette of Belarus, wheat ears and a red star. It is sometimes referred to as the coat of arms of Belarus, although in heraldic terms this is inaccurate as the emblem does not respect the rules of conventional heraldry. The emblem is an allusion to one that was used by the Byelorussian SSR, designed by Ivan Dubasov in 1950, with the biggest change being a replacement of the Communist hammer and sickle with a silhouette of Belarus. The Belarusian name is Dziaržaŭny hierb Respubliki Biełaruś (Дзяржаўны герб Рэспублікі Беларусь), and the name in Russian is Gosudarstvennyĭ gerb Respubliki Belarusʹ (Государственный герб Республики Беларусь).

Between 1991 and 1995, Belarus used a coat of arms, known as the Pahonia, as its national emblem. The Pahonia was originally a symbol of the Grand Duchy of Lithuania, of which Belarus had historically been a part.

== Description ==
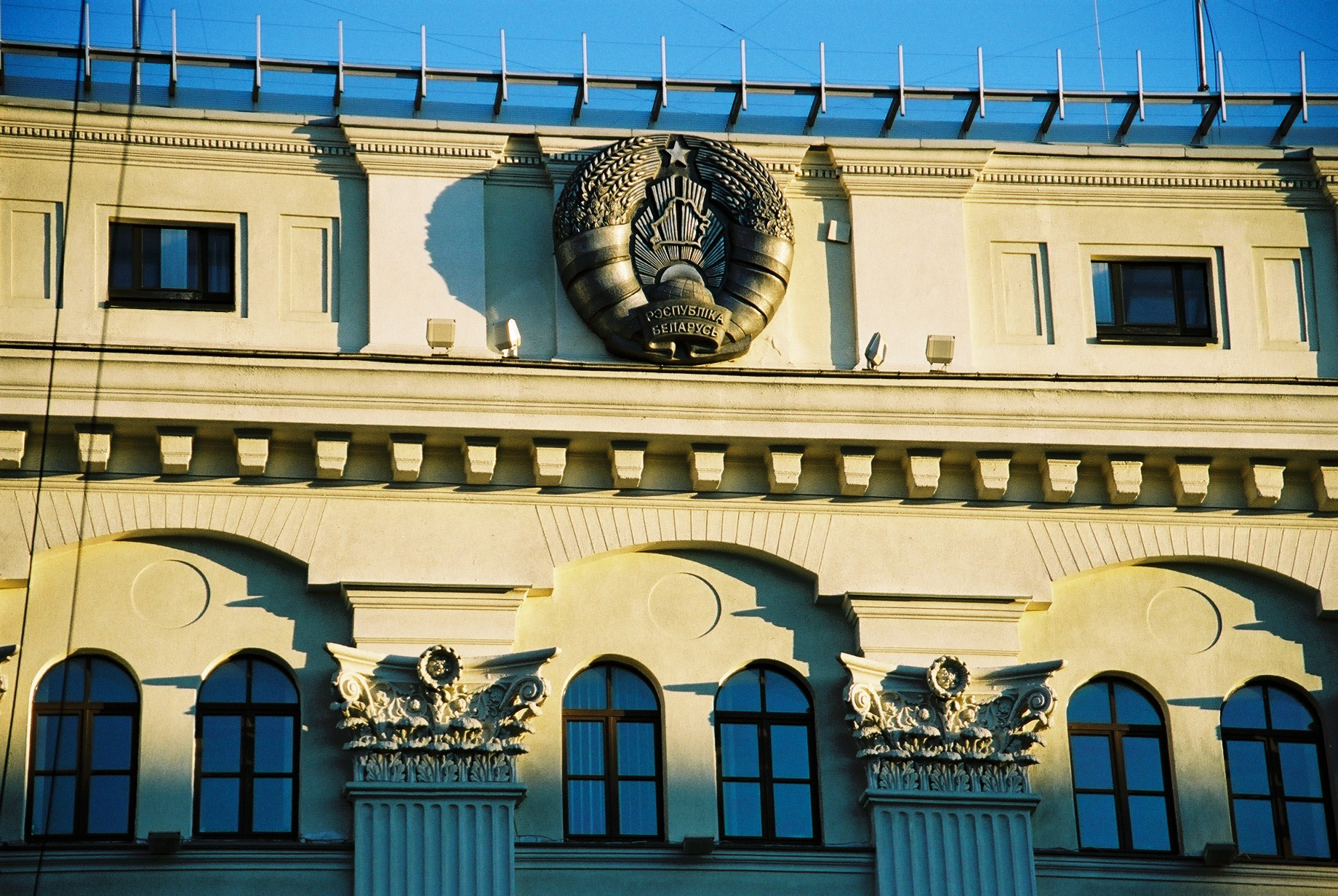
The emblem on the National Bank building in Minsk

=== Design ===
In the center of the emblem sits an orange outline of Belarus, superimposed over the rays of golden sun. The sun is partially covered by a globe, with the landmass (part of Eurasia) in red and waters in blue. Lining the left and right sides of the emblem are stalks of wheat, superimposed with flowers. Clovers adorn the left wheat stalks; flax flowers adorn the right. Wrapped around the wheat stalks is a red and green ribbon bearing the colours of the flag of Belarus; the ribbon meets at the base of the emblem, where the name Republic of Belarus (Рэспубліка Беларусь) is inscribed in gold in Belarusian. At the top of the emblem, there is a five-pointed red star.

=== Symbolism ===
The elements that comprise the state emblem are not tied to any "official" symbolism. The design of the emblem of the Byelorussian SSR was used as the basis for the current Belarusian emblem; the primary difference between the two is that the Byelorussian SSR emblem contains more references to Communism, such as the Communist symbol of hammer and sickle and pure red ribbon with Communist mottoes, which the modern emblem does not, replaced with the outline and the flag of Belarus, respectively; however, it still retains the communist red star, the red ribbon (albeit without the mottoes), the globe and the wheat bundles, which are also typical of Soviet emblems and still is very Soviet in nature.

=== Legislation ===
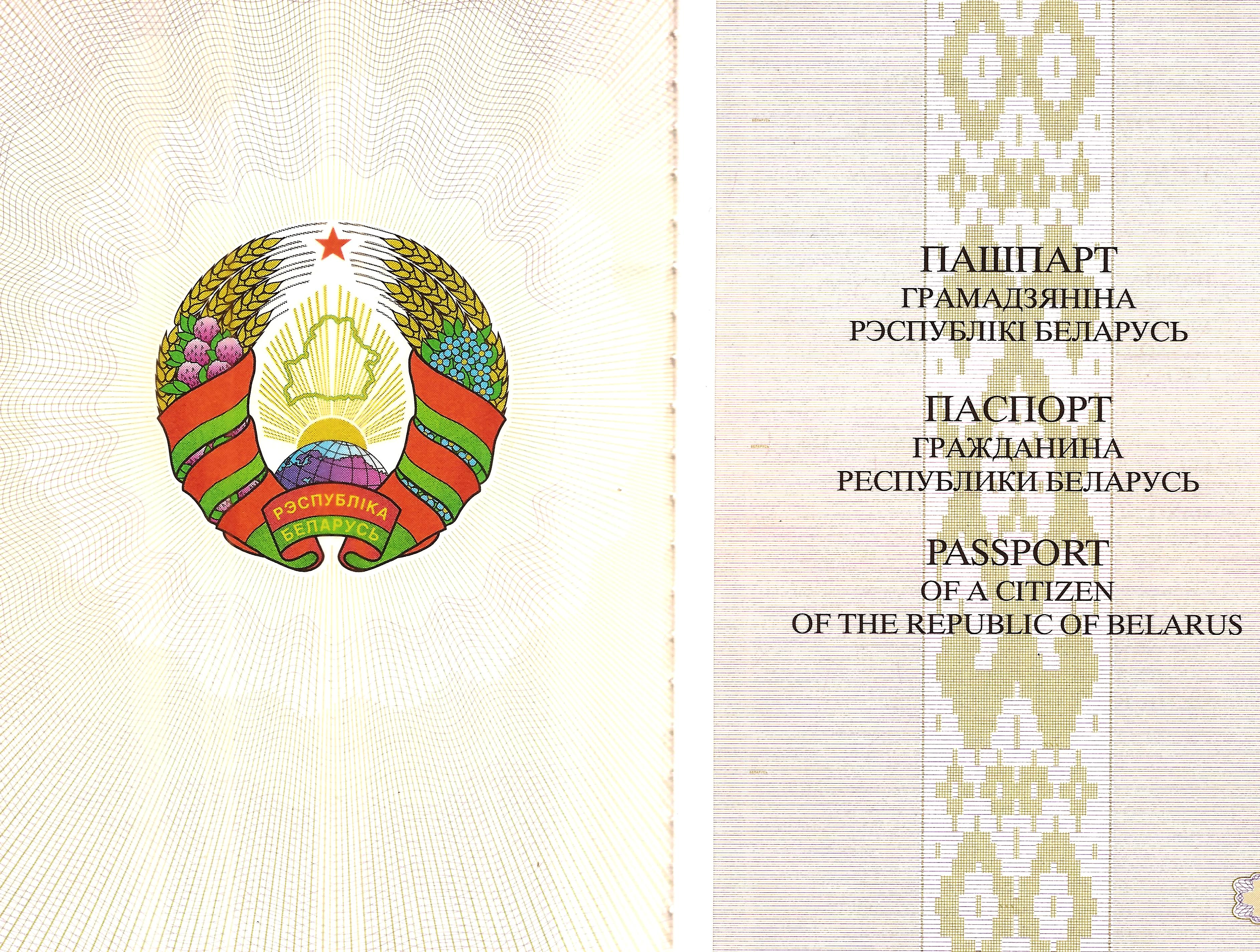
Belarusian passport bearing the state emblem on the left. 2009

The current law regulating the design and use of the Belarusian emblem was passed on July 5, 2004. Article 9 of Chapter 3 of Law No. 301-3 begins by describing the official drawing of the Belarusian arms and regulates its proper design. Officially, the arms can be drawn in full colour, monochrome or using two colors. Article 10 states that the national emblem must be displayed at specified locations continually, such as the residences of the Belarusian leader, the chamber of the National Assembly and at governmental offices of national and regional levels.

The emblem can also be used on documents issued by the government, including money, passports and official letterheads. In addition, the emblem is displayed on all ballot boxes, campaign mailings and promotional standards when the election is starting. It also appears on their border posts between Belarus and Russia.

The law also restricts the use of the emblem in other contexts—e.g. cities, towns or oblasts may not adopt a coat of arms or emblem using the national emblem either completely or in part. Furthermore, organizations not listed in the Law on State Symbols may only use the emblem by permission. The emblem can be used by both foreigners and citizens of Belarus, as long as the symbol is displayed with respect, although citizens may not use the state emblem on letterheads or business cards if they are not agents of the government.

== History ==
=== Pahonia ===
Pahonia (Пагоня)

Versions
- Version currently used by the Rada of the Belarusian Democratic Republic in exile
- Armiger: Ivonka Survilla, President of the Rada of the Belarusian Democratic Republic
- Use: Belarusian Democratic Republic (1918–present [in exile]); Republic of Belarus (1991–1995); Various Belarusian cultural and political organisations (since 1918)

Despite the fact that the Belarusians share a distinct ethnic identity and language, they never previously had a political sovereignty prior to 1918. According to vexillologist Whitney Smith, the unique Belarusian national symbols were not created until the 20th century, as a consequence of the foreign rule of the Belarusian territories by Prussia, Poland, Lithuania, and Russia. According to the formerly popular historian Arnold J. Toynbee, the pagan Lithuanians performed sweeping conquests of the Orthodox Ruthenians and this medieval greatness of Lithuania was conveyed in its heraldic emblem – a galloping horseman. The 18th-century Russian historian Vasily Tatishchev, who was at the time able to consult the subsequently lost Polotsk Chronicle, maintained that "from time immemorial the coat of arms of Belarus [White Rus′] depicted a knight on horseback with his sword raised."

At the same time, Belarusian nationalists viewed the Grand Duchy of Lithuania as a historical form of Belarusian statehood along with medieval principalities of Polotsk, Turov and others. In the Lithuanian state's early years, Ruthenian culture dominated the region. The Lithuanians allowed their East Slavic vassals to remain Orthodox, maintain their privileges and authority in local areas. Extensively influenced by their outnumbering Ruthenian subjects, Lithuanians reorganized their army, government administration, and legal and financial systems on Ruthenian models. A predecessor of Belarusian language, Ruthenian (also called Old Belarusian by various sources), was used as an administrative language in the 14th to 16th centuries in the Grand Duchy of Lithuania. According to James H. Bater, the ruling Lithuanian warrior caste intermarried extensively with the nobility ruling the East Slav vassal principalities and accepted Orthodoxy. According to Richard Antony French, under Lithuanian rule, Belarusians had considerable autonomy.

This led to the Pahonia, one of the symbols of the Grand Duchy of Lithuania, being accepted by Belarusian nationalists as a symbol of Belarus since the early 20th century. It was the official coat of arms of the Belarusian Democratic Republic since 1918. It was banned in the USSR, but widely and consistently used by the Belarusian post-World War II diaspora. Pahonia was the first coat of arms of the Republic of Belarus in 1991–1995. Since 1995, it has become one of the symbols of the democratic opposition to the authoritarian president Alexander Lukashenko, particularly during the 2020–2021 Belarusian protests.

==== Origins ====
Some Belarusian historians make a connection between the Pahonia and the cultural context, religious and mythological beliefs of Belarus' earliest inhabitants. Horse worship was widespread both among Slavs and Balts. Lithuanian mythologists believe that the bright rider on the white horse symbolizes the ghost of the ancestral warrior, reminiscent of core values and goals, giving strength and courage. In Belarusian folklore, Yarilo – the ancient pagan god of spring revival and soil fertility – was particularly present. He was described as a young and handsome man on a white horse. Lithuanian ethnologist and folklorist Jonas Trinkūnas suggested that the Lithuanian horseman depicts Perkūnas, who was considered as the god of the Lithuanian soldiers, thunder, lightning, storms, and rain in Lithuanian mythology. Very early on, Perkūnas was imagined as a horseman and archeological findings testify that Lithuanians had amulets with horsemen already in the 10th–11th centuries, moreover, Lithuanians were previously buried with their horses who were sacrificed during pagan rituals, and prior to that it is likely that these horses carried the deceased to the burial sites.

St George was and still is traditionally portrayed riding a horse. He was one of Byzantine Christianity's most popular saints, which spread in Belarus since the 10th century. Brothers Boris and Gleb, two saints revered by east Slavs, were frequently portrayed on a horse.

The Pahonia derives from the coat of arms of the Grand Duchy of Lithuania. It was a regional symbol of Belarusian lands since the time when the territory of modern Belarus made up the largest part of the Grand Duchy of Lithuania, where different variations of it were symbols of the Voivodeships of Minsk, Vitebsk, Polotsk, Brest Litovsk, Mstsislaw and Vilnius (of which the southern and eastern parts are now part of Belarus)

As Belarus was incorporated into the Russian Empire following the Partitions of Poland in the late 18th century, the Pahonia remained a key element of the coats of arms of some of Russian guberniyas established on the territory of Belarus: Vitebsk Governorate, Vilna Governorate. Besides that, under Russian rule, the Pahonia became an element (or the basis of) newly established coats of arms of numerous cities in Belarus and the neighbouring territories, including Polotsk, Vitebsk, Lyepyel, Mogilev and others.

==== 20th century ====
The Pahonia was the state emblem of the Belarusian Democratic Republic. It was also featured on a postcard printed by the government of the Belarusian Democratic Republic as the symbol of most of the “Belarusian voivodeships”. Since then, it is used by the Rada of the Belarusian Democratic Republic, the government-in-exile, as the “state symbol of Belarus”.

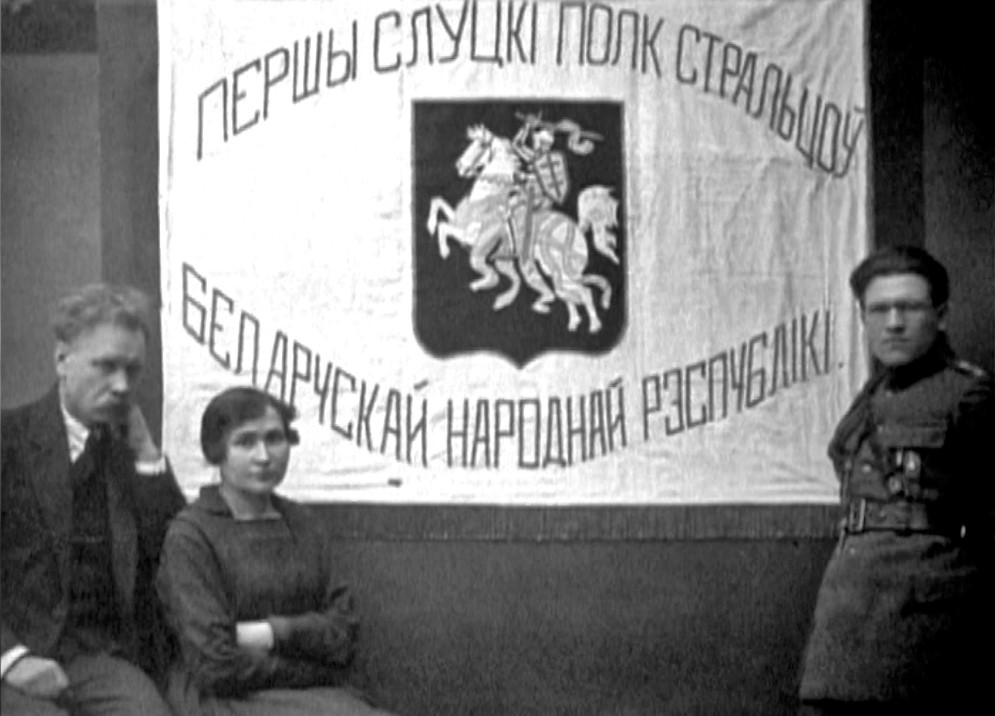
Banner of the Belarusian army during the Slutsk uprising, 1920

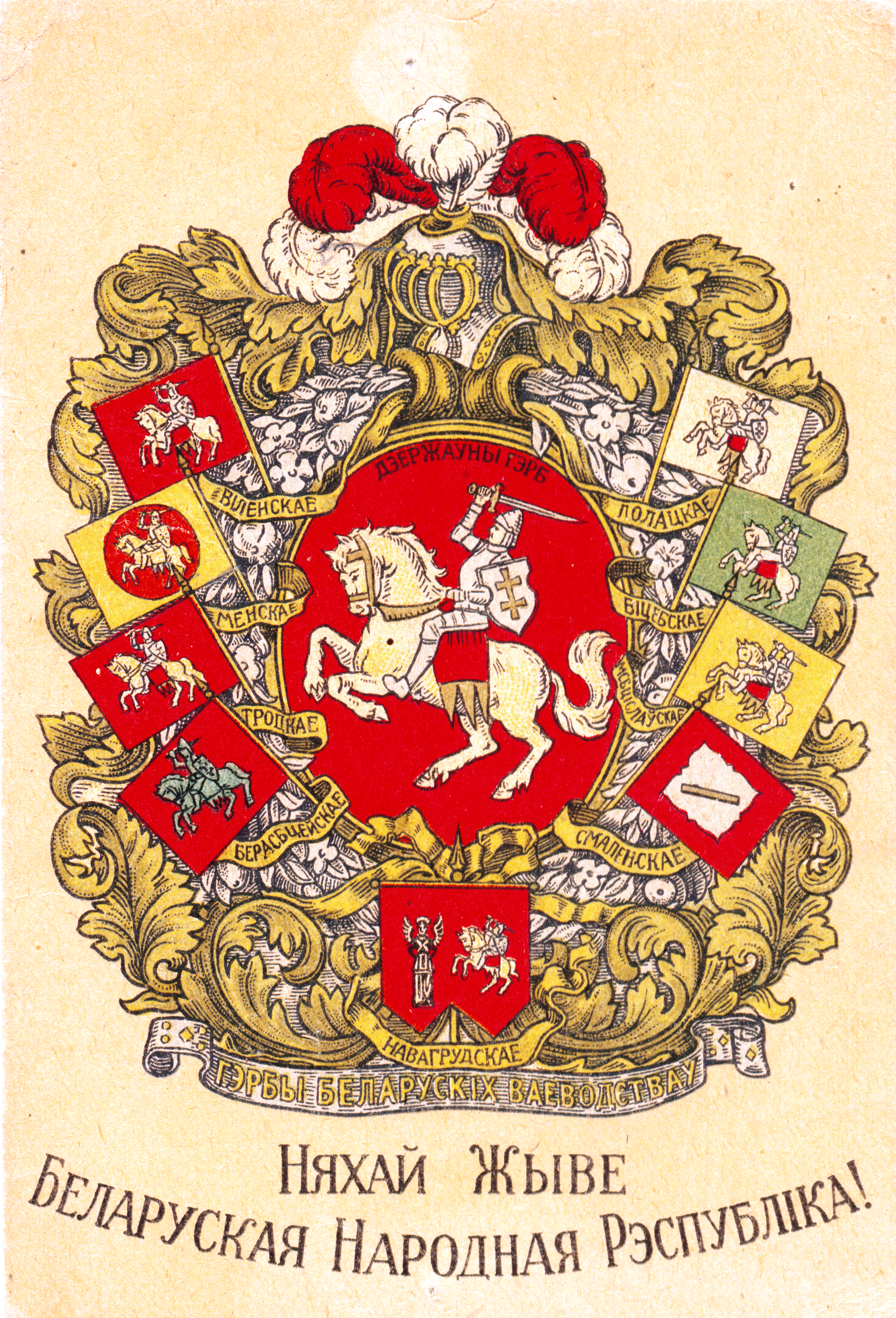
“Coats of arms of Belarusian voivodeships”, a postcard printed by the Belarusian Democratic Republic

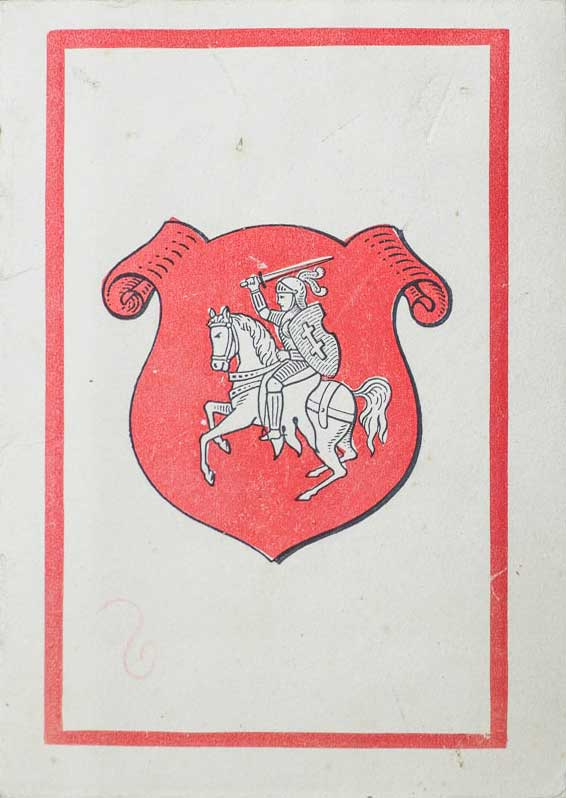
A page from the passport of the Belarusian Democratic Republic

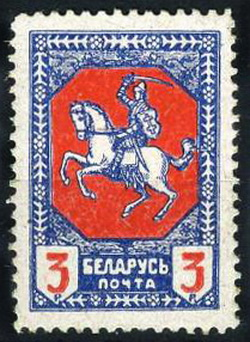
Postal stamp issued by the Belarusian Democratic Republic

As West Belarus became part of interwar Poland, the Pahonia was used as the symbol of several provinces established on its territory, namely the Polesie Voivodeship, the Wilno Voivodeship, and the Nowogródek Voivodeship.

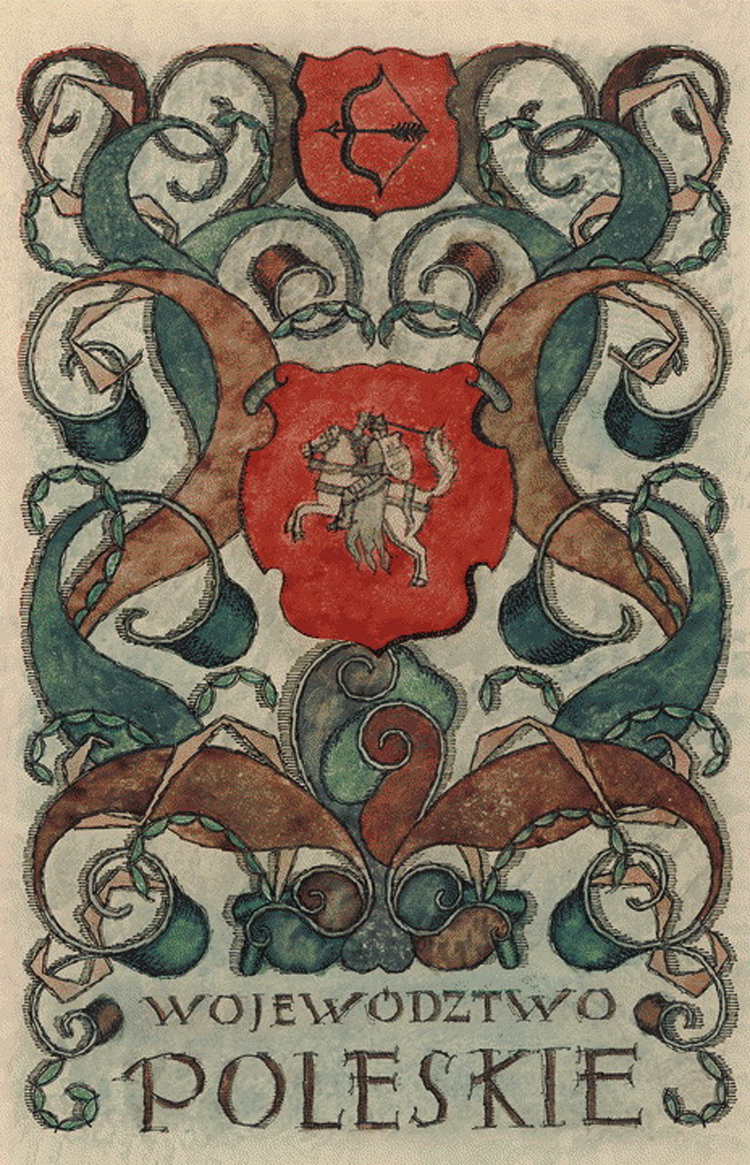
Coat of arms of Polesie Voivodeship on an interwar era decorative print

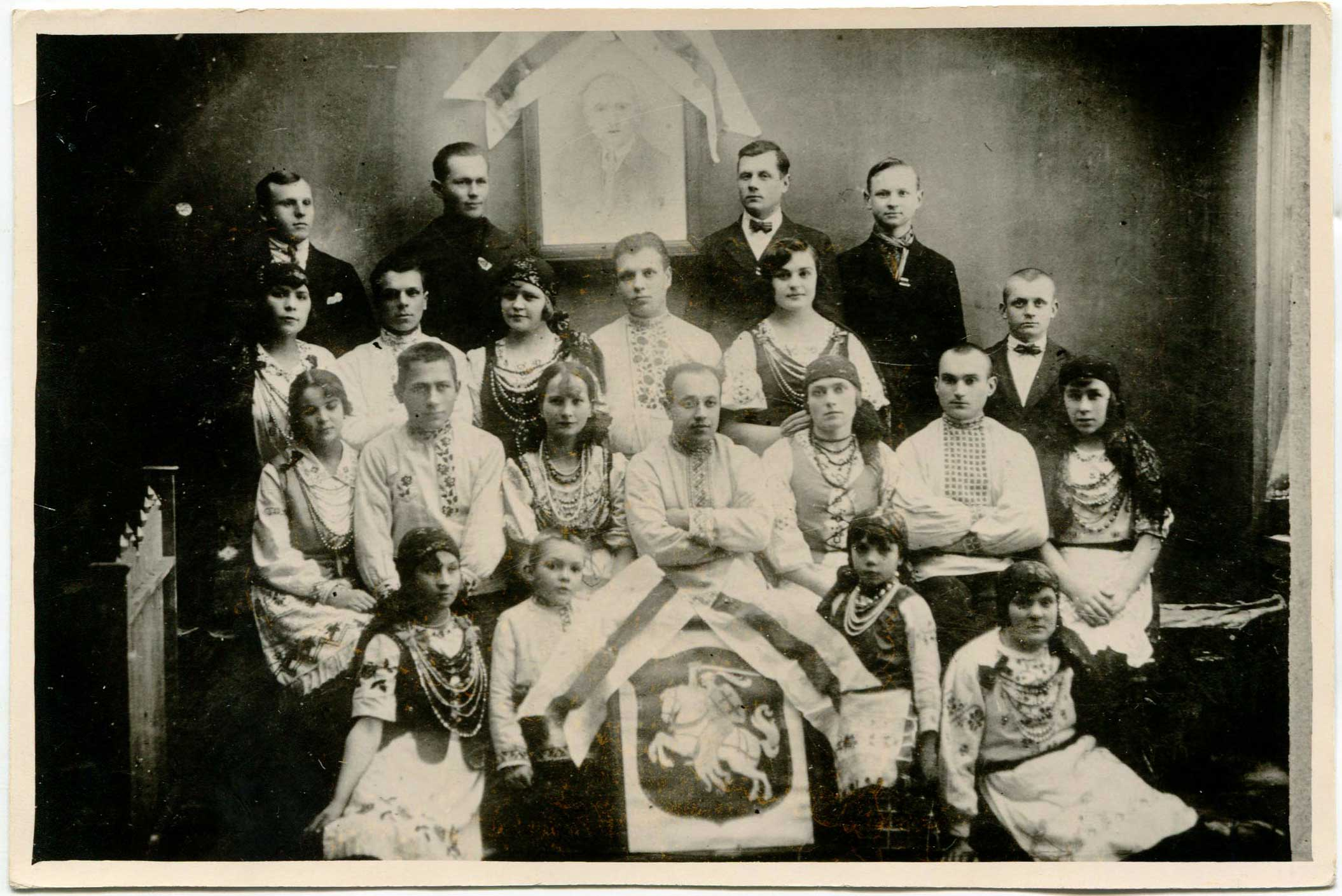
Members of the local branch of the Belarusian Schools Society in Mir in 1930, with the Pahonia and white-red-white flags

It was also used by West Belarusian political and cultural organisations, such as the Belarusian Schools Society and others.

During World War II, the pro-German collaborationist Belarusian Central Council used the Pahonia as its symbol.

Since after the war, the Pahonia has been used by organisations of the Belarusian diaspora such as the Association of Belarusians in Great Britain, the Belarusian Canadian Alliance and the newspaper Biełarus. A publishing and printing house based in Toronto and New York was named Pahonia; it produced also Belarusian titles.

The Order of the Pahonia was established by the Rada of the Belarusian Democratic Republic in exile in 1949 as the highest state award of Belarus. Since 2022, the Medal of the Order of the Pahonia is awarded by the BNR Rada.

Pahonia features on the original jacket of the first anthology of Belarusian poetry in English translation, Like Water, Like Fire (London, 1971).

In the Byelorussian Soviet Socialist Republic, part of the Soviet Union, the public demonstration of the Pahonia was banned, as was the case with non-Soviet national symbols in other republics of the Soviet Union.

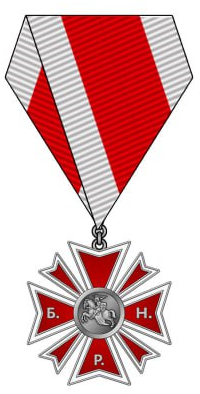
Order of the Pahonia, the highest state award of the Belarusian Democratic Republic, established in exile in 1949

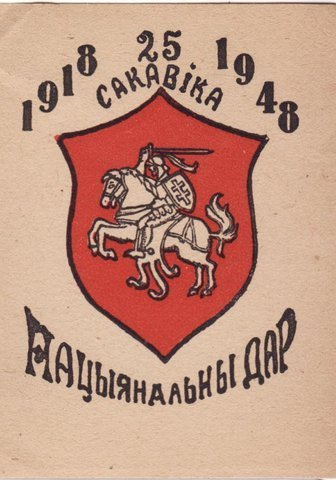
Pahonia on a printed leaflet of Belarusian exiles in 1948, dedicated to the 30th anniversary of the Belarusian Democratic Republic

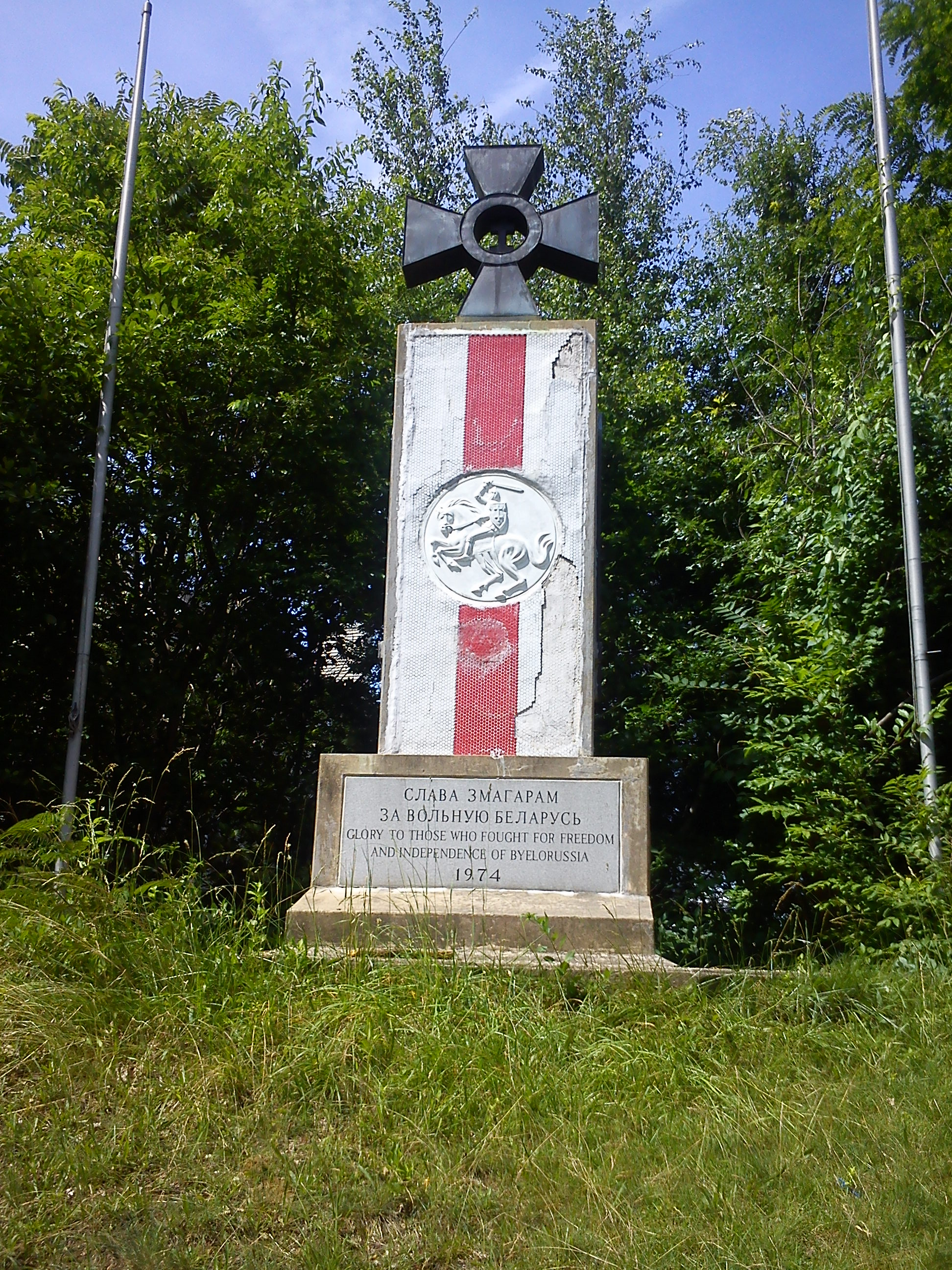
Belarusian monument in South River, New Jersey with a Pahonia on it

1950 stamp issued by the Belarusian diaspora to commemorate the Belarusian Democratic Republic

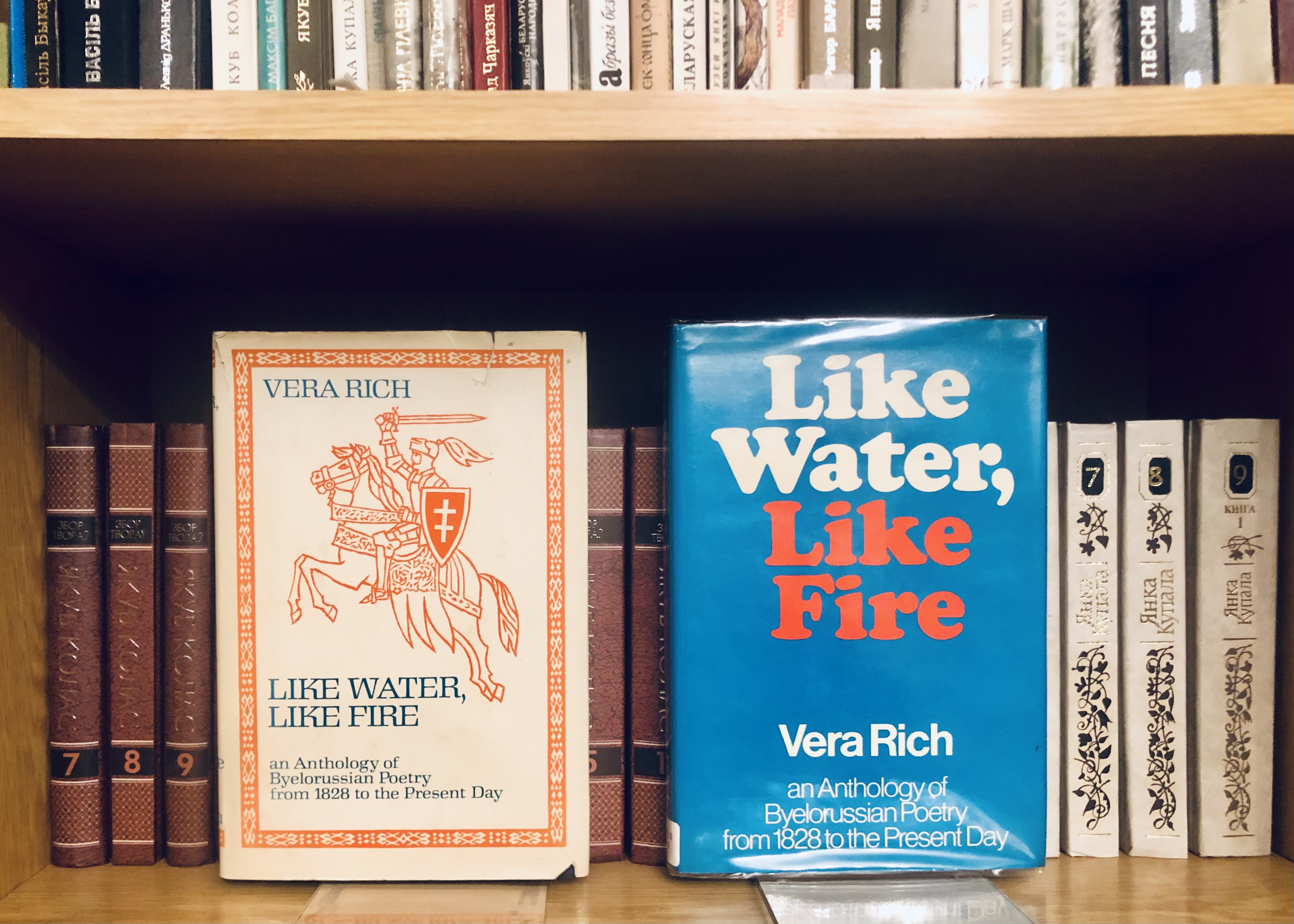
Like Water, Like Fire - the first anthology of Belarusian poetry in English translation (London, 1971).

==== As a state symbol in the Republic of Belarus ====
In the late 1980s, Belarusian pro-democracy organisations united under the Belarusian Popular Front have started using the symbols of the Belarusian Democratic Republic, including the Pahonia, as their symbols demanding democracy and independence of Belarus.

In 1991, after Belarus declared independence from the Soviet Union, the Pahonia became the coat of arms of the Republic of Belarus. The official version of the coat of arms was drafted by the artist Jauhien Kulik, an active member of the Belarusian Popular Front.

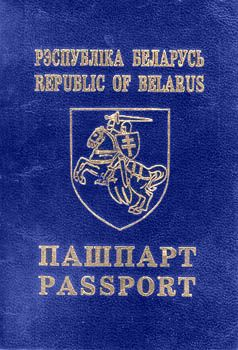
Belarusian passport, 1991–1995

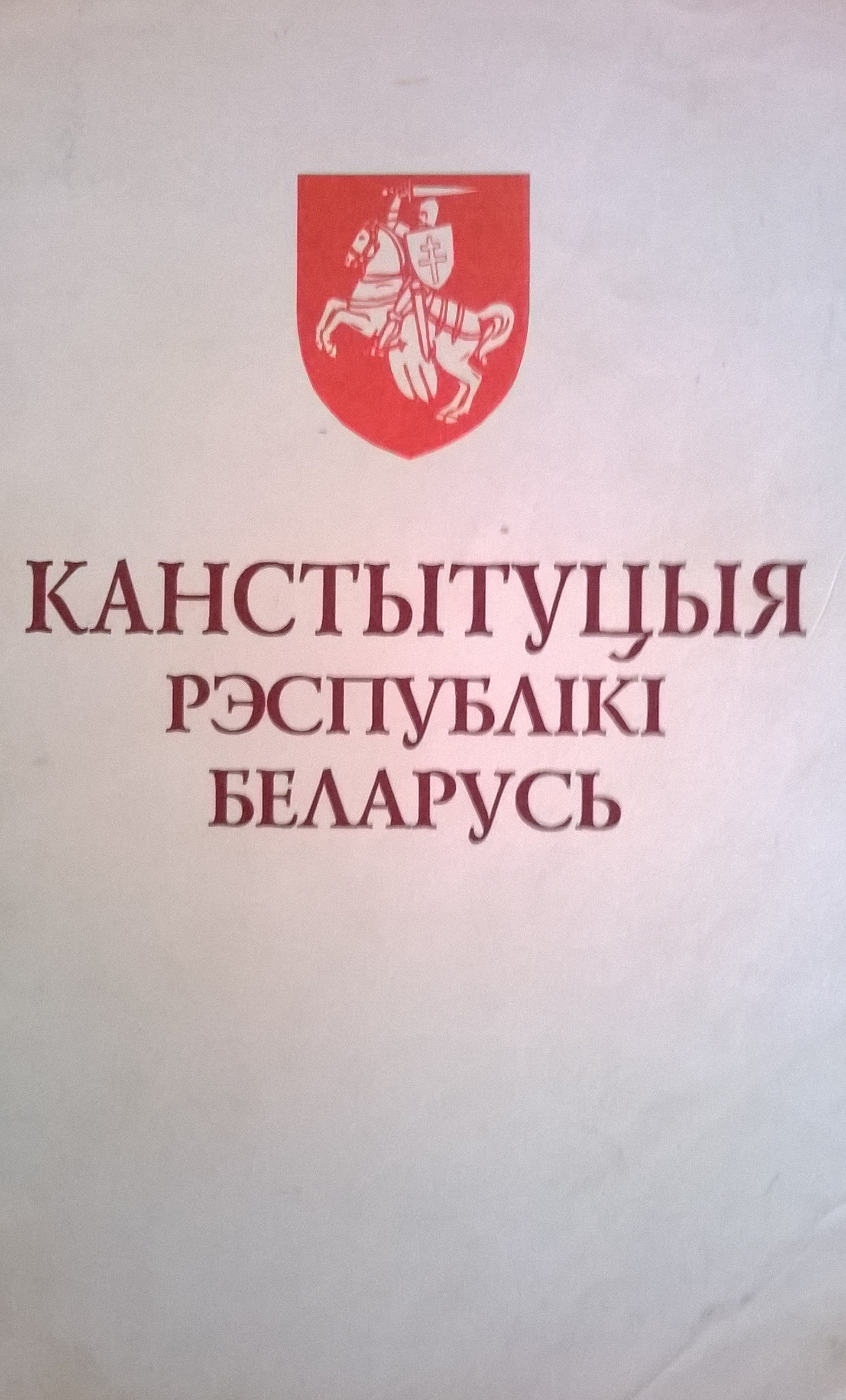
Constitution of Belarus, 1994

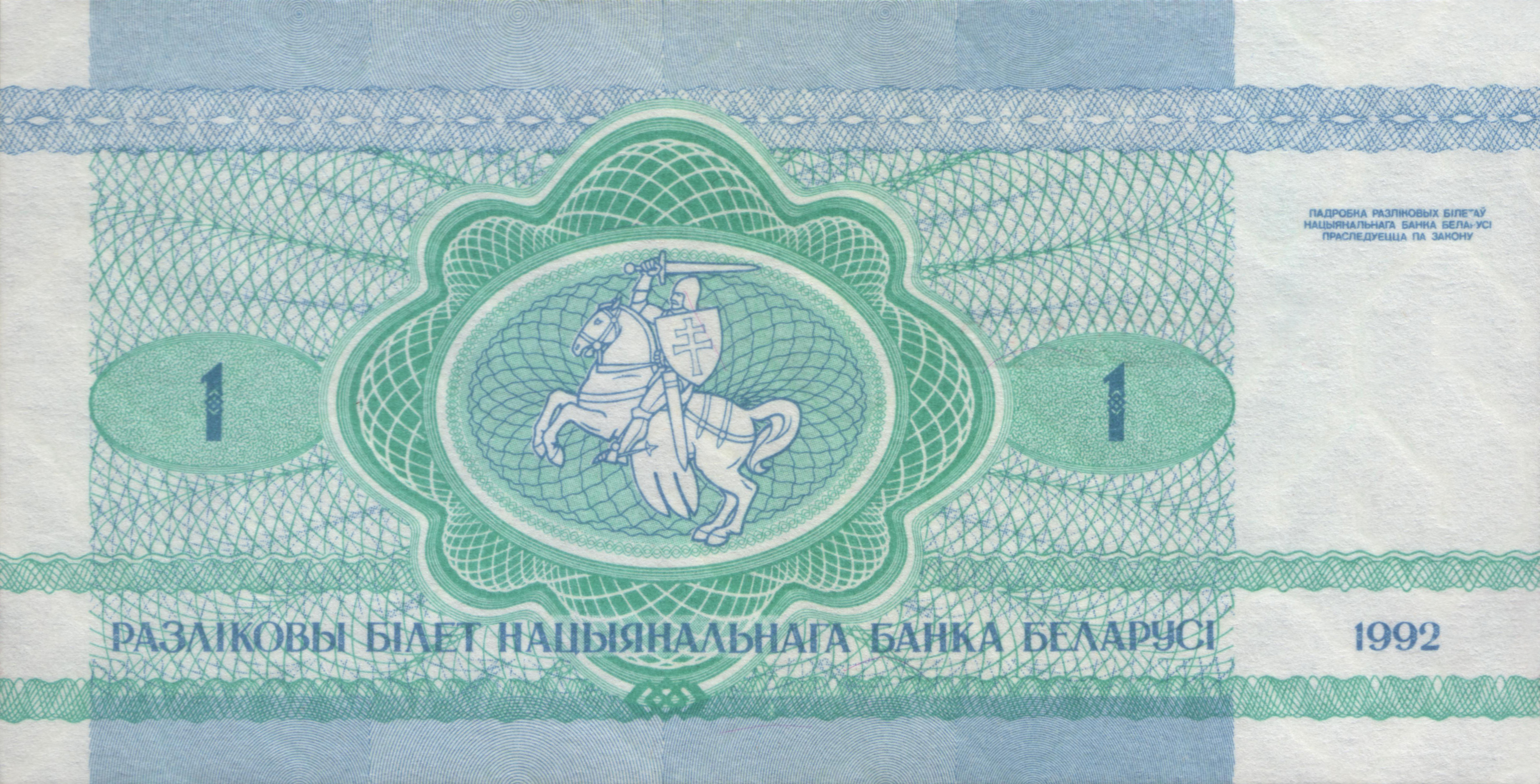
1 ruble note, 1992

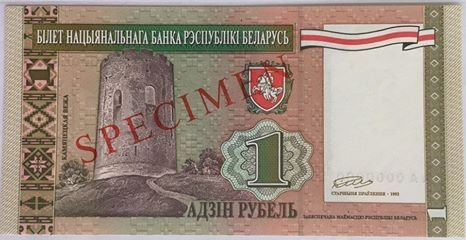
1 ruble note, 1993 (did not enter circulation)

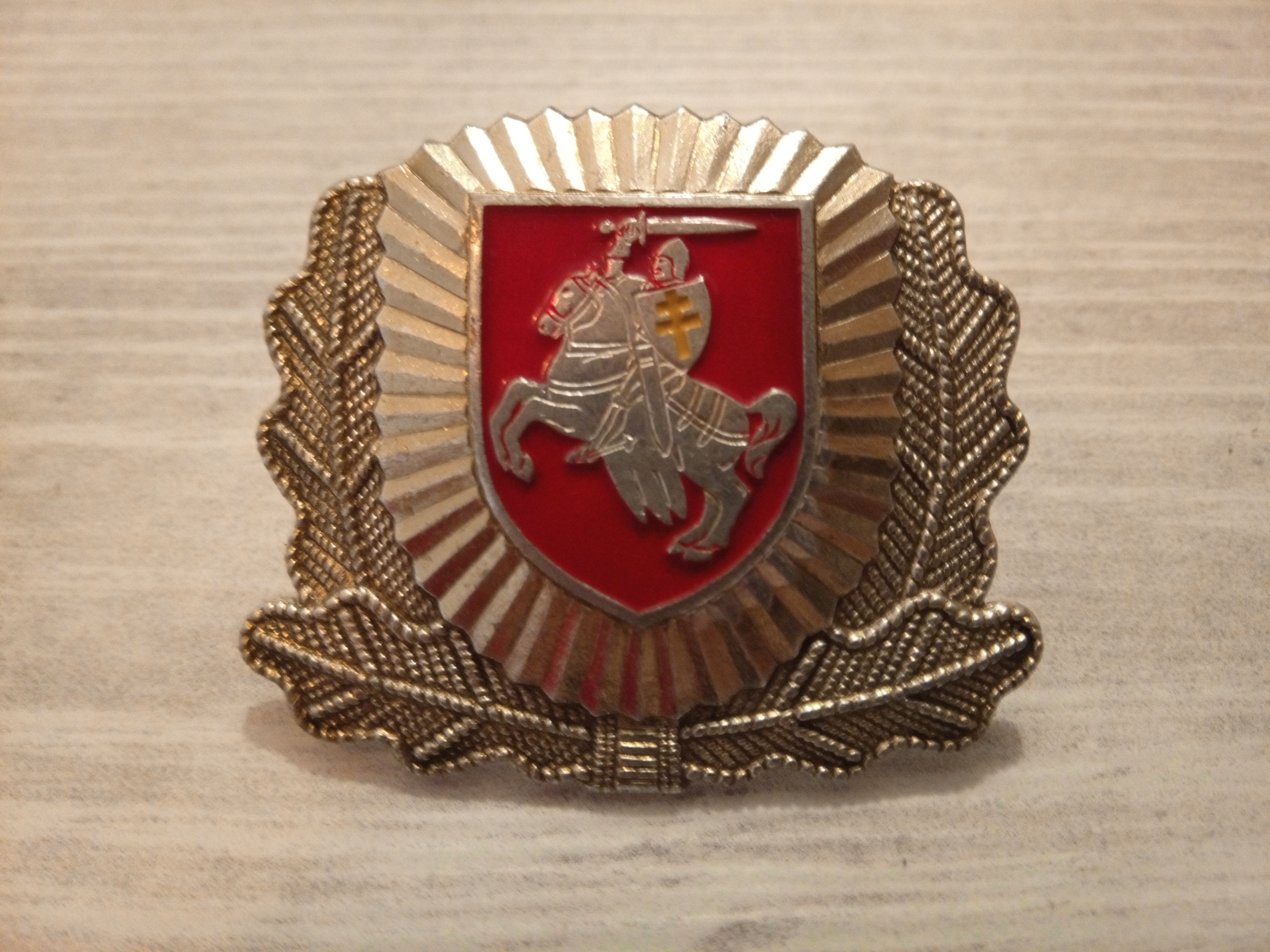
Police badge, 1992

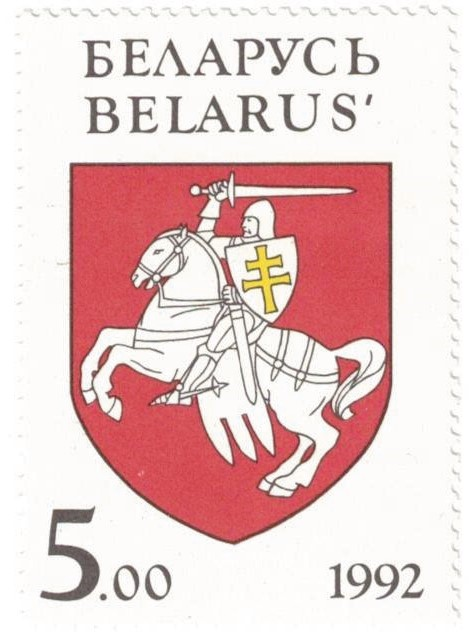
Belarusian stamp, 1992

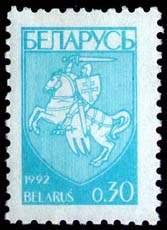
Belarusian stamp, 1992

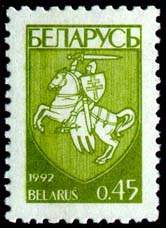
Belarusian stamp, 1992

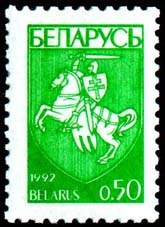
Belarusian stamp, 1992

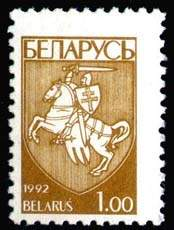
Belarusian stamp, 1992

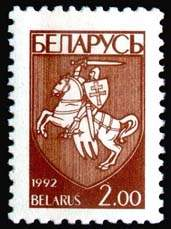
Belarusian stamp, 1992

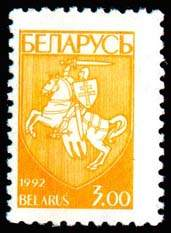
Belarusian stamp, 1992

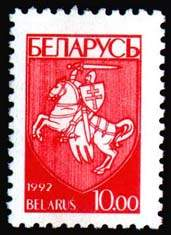
Belarusian stamp, 1992

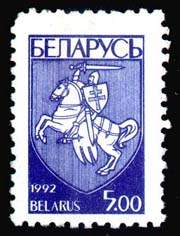
Belarusian stamp, 1992

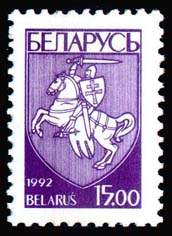
Belarusian stamp, 1992

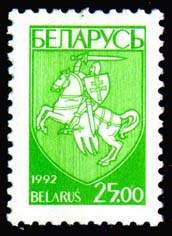
Belarusian stamp, 1992

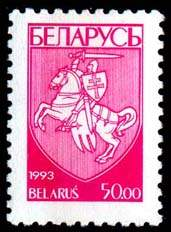
Belarusian stamp, 1993

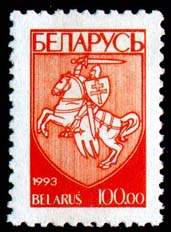
Belarusian stamp, 1993

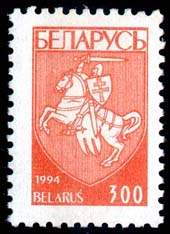
Belarusian stamp, 1994

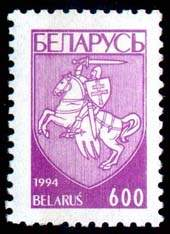
Belarusian stamp, 1994

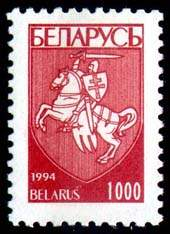
Belarusian stamp, 1994

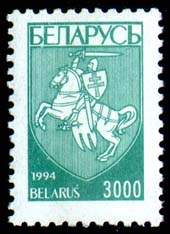
Belarusian stamp, 1994

===== Referendum of 1995 =====
The official status of Pahonia as the state coat of arms was cancelled in June 1995 by the president Alexander Lukashenko following a referendum held earlier that year. The legality of the referendum and the validity of its results has been actively questioned by the democratic opposition to Lukashenko, with some people, such as former judge of the Constitutional Court of Belarus Mikhail Pastukhov and former parliament member Siarhei Navumchyk, even stating that the Pahonia and the White-red-white flag, are still de jure the symbols of Belarus, due to the proclaimed illegality of the referendum. Supporters of the Pahonia also criticize that the Pahonia and the former White-red-white flag were compared to ones used by collaborationist forces during World War II in propaganda that was published during the run-up to the vote. The comparison was made as the white, red, white flag and Pahonia being used on the patches and symbols of the Belarusian Central Rada, the Belarusian administration that collaborated with Nazi Germany. Alexander Lukashenko claimed the selection of the Soviet-inspired symbols as a victory, especially to his Great Patriotic War veteran base, by saying "we have returned to you the flag of the country for which you fought. We have returned to you both memory and a sense of human pride."

==== Modern usage ====
Since the mid-1990s, the Pahonia is widely used by the opposition to president Lukashenko, alongside the white-red-white flag. Persons have been arrested and subject to other political repressions for the public display of the Pahonia or the white-red-white flag.

Despite that, in 2007, the Pahonia has been included in the official list of objects of the immaterial historical and cultural heritage of Belarus.

Since the 1990s, the Pahonia is an element of the symbols of several Belarusian political and cultural organisations such as: the World Association of Belarusians, Union of Poles in Belarus, Francišak Skaryna Belarusian Language Society. Numerous organisations of the Belarusian diaspora continue using the Pahonia as their symbol or as an element thereof since the 1940s.

In 2018, the Rada of the Belarusian Democratic Republic awarded the Belarusian Democratic Republic 100th Jubilee Medal to commemorate the 100th anniversary of the establishment of BNR, which features the 1918 styled Pahonia.

The popularity of Pahonia in Belarus rose again during the mass protests that followed a controversial presidential election of 2020. The Pahonia, in its version as the coat of arms of Belarus in 1991–1995, was actively used by pro-democracy protesters in Belarus and at solidarity events internationally alongside the white-red-white flag. The patriotic anthem of the same name, Pahonia, inspired by the coat of arms, was one of the symbols of the protests against the regime of Alexander Lukashenko. Pahonia is also used by Sviatlana Tsikhanouskaya, the exiled leader of the protests.

According to Aleś Čajčyc, the Information Secretary of the Rada of the Belarusian Democratic Republic, the English's Wikipedia's Pahonia article was deleted by Lithuanian nationalists, who redirected it to the Coat of arms of Lithuania. He encouraged Belarusians to edit Wikipedia in order "to defend Belarusian interests there" and "rebuff to the detractors of Belarus, of which there are many". However the same year after secretary's statement the official Twitter account of the exiled government tweeted that the coat of arms is "a symbol of centuries of friendship between Belarusians and Lithuanians".

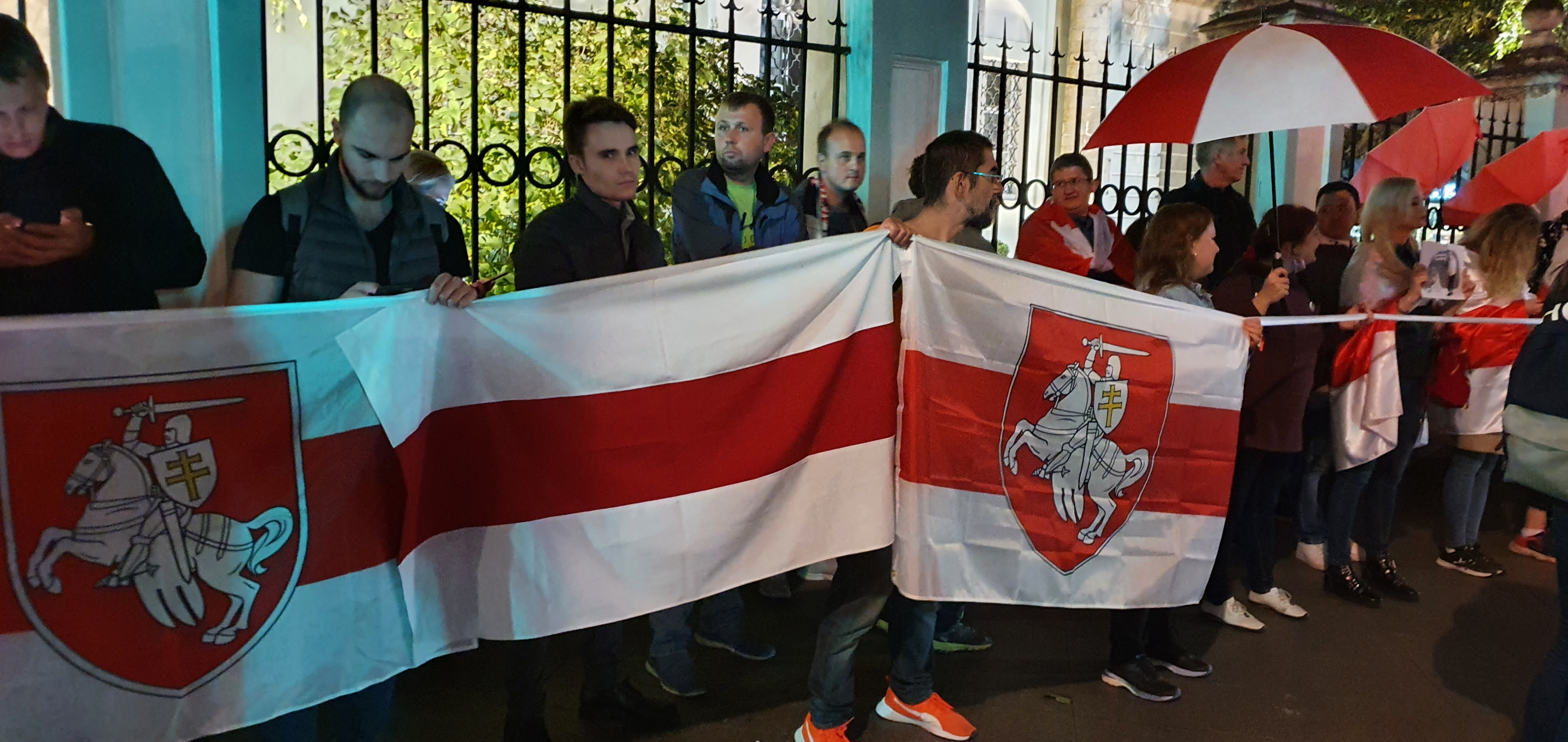
Protests by members of the Belarusian diaspora in Moscow, September 2020

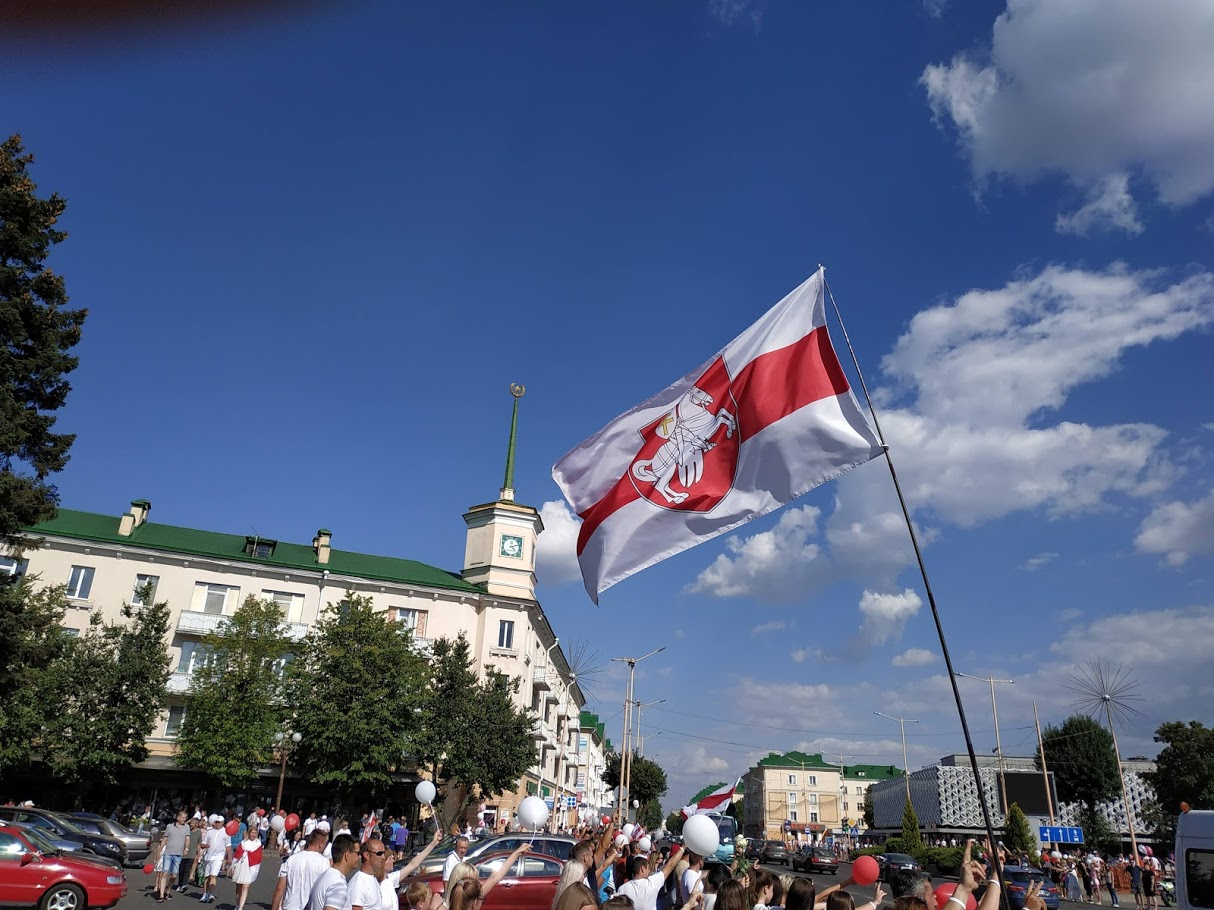
Protesters in Baranavichy holding a flag with the Pahonia, 16 August 2020

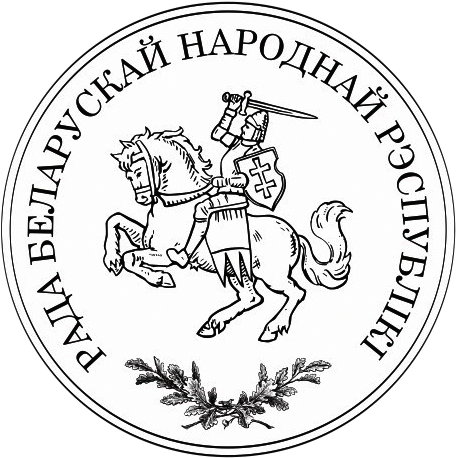
Front side of the Belarusian Democratic Republic 100th Jubilee Medal

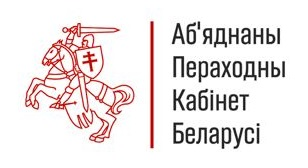
Emblem of the United Transitional Cabinet

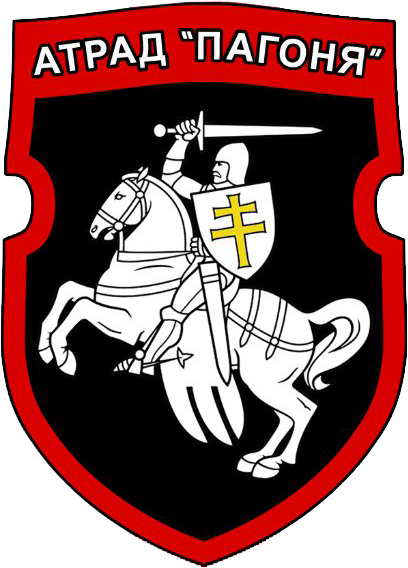
Pahonia Detachment

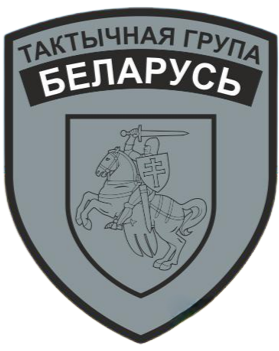
Tactical group "Belarus"

Kastuś Kalinoŭski Regiment

=== Emblem of the Byelorussian SSR ===
From 1920 until the fall of the Soviet Union in 1991, the Byelorussian SSR used an emblem instead of a coat of arms. The first emblem used by Soviet Belarus was adopted in 1919 and is similar to the contemporary insignia of the Russian and Ukrainian republics. The central part of the emblem is a stylized red shield, showing a golden sun rising from the base. Above the sun is a crossed golden hammer and sickle, symbolizing the unity between workers and peasants. Above the hammer and sickle, the letters Б.С.С.Р are shown in black, denoting the name of the republic. БССР (BSSR) is an abbreviation for the full name of the republic; "Беларуская Савецкая Сацыялістычная Рэспубліка", the Byelorussian Soviet Socialist Republic. The shield is framed by ears of wheat meeting at its base and featuring a red ribbon inscribed in black with the state motto of the Soviet Union, "Workers of the World, Unite!" The text is written in the Belarusian language.

In 1937, this emblem was replaced by a new one, removing the shield and including more text. The right side of the emblem features oak leaves and the left features wheat ears with clovers placed on top. In the center of the emblem, the sun is rising behind a profile of Earth. A hammer, sickle and red star appears over the sun. Around the ears of wheat and leaves of oak is a red ribbon, featuring the phrase "Workers of the World, Unite!" written (from left to right) in Belarusian, Yiddish, Polish and Russian. The initials Б.С.С.Р are shown at its base denoting the name of the republic. Ten years before in 1927, the arms were the same except for the wording on the bottom ribbon. Instead of the letters reading БССР, the letters read "С.С.Р.Б", which stood for the Soviet Socialist Republic of Byelorussia.

This emblem was in turn replaced by a new one in 1950. The central feature of this symbol is a crossed hammer and sickle, a universal Communist symbol symbolizing the unity of workers and peasants. Below this symbol, a sun is shown rising behind a globe. The insignia is framed by ears of wheat, each ear ending in flowers; clover on the left and flax on the right. A red ribbon is wrapped around the ears of wheat, reminiscent of the red flag used by the Communist movement. The base of the emblem shows the letters БССР. The ribbon features the phrase Workers of the World, Unite! The left side is inscribed in Belarusian, the right side is in Russian. The red star of Communism is featured above the hammer and sickle. The 1950 version was designed by Ivan Dubasov, a People's Artist of the USSR. Article 119 of the Constitution of the Byelorussian SSR defines the design of the emblem.

1919–1920 coat of arms

1920–1927 coat of arms

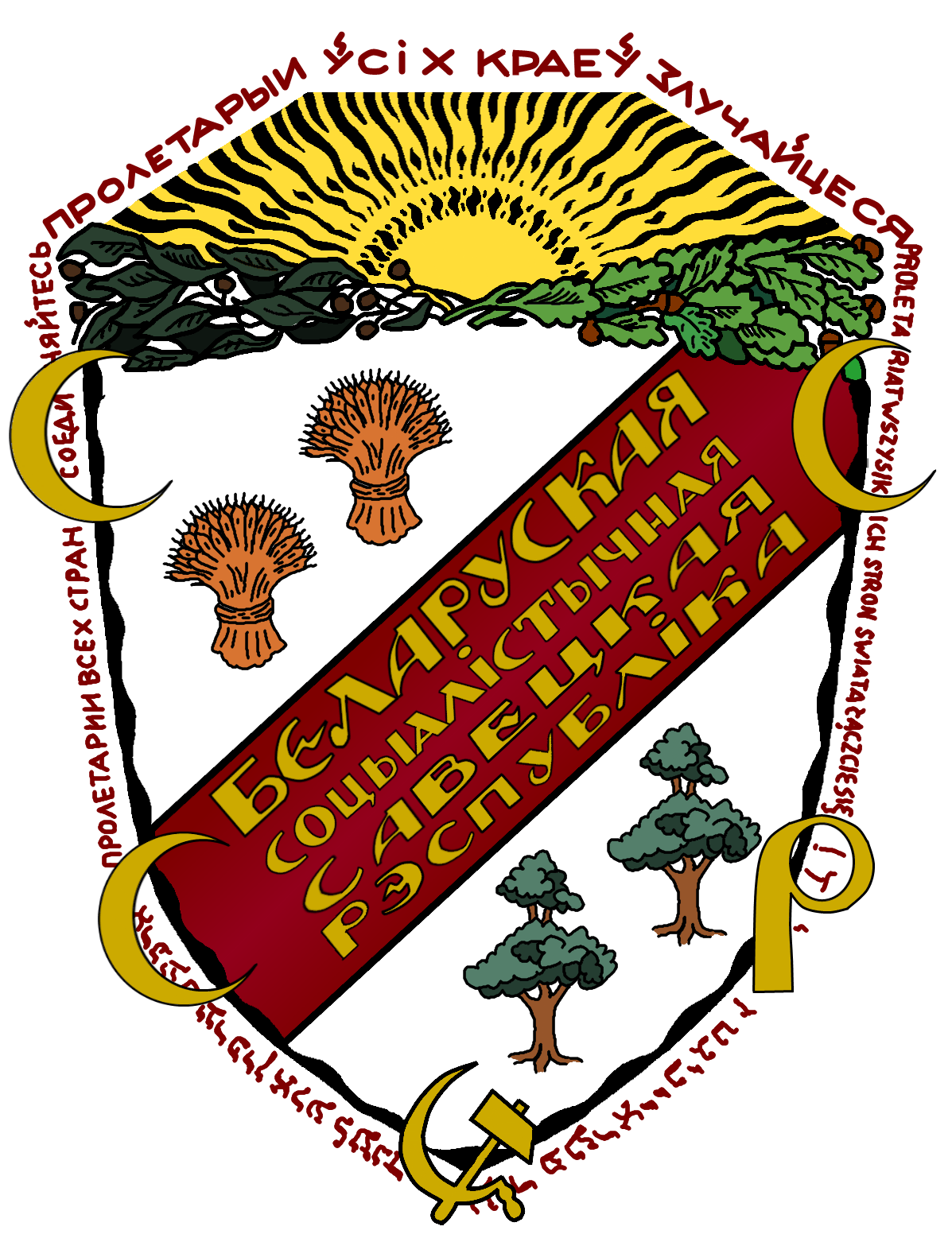
1924 proposed coat of arms

1927–1937 coat of arms

1937–1938 coat of arms with the inscription Workers of the World, Unite! (from left to right) in Belarusian, Yiddish, Russian and Polish

1938–1949 coat of arms

1949–1958 coat of arms

1958–1981 coat of arms

1981–1991 coat of arms (modification)

=== Amendments to the national emblem ===
In February 2020, the Belarusian parliament updated the emblem, with the globe centred on Belarus and showing more of Europe, rather than Russia and the colour of the outline map of the country changed from green to gold.

1995–2012 coat of arms

2012–2020 coat of arms

2020–present coat of arms

== See also ==
- Armorial of sovereign states
- Belarusian heraldry
- Coat of arms of Lithuania
- Emblem of the Byelorussian Soviet Socialist Republic
- Flag of Belarus
- National symbols of Belarus
