= Jauhien Kulik =

The 1991–1995 Coat of Arms of Belarus designed by Jauhien Kulik

Jauhien Kulik (October 31, 1937 – January 12, 2002) was a Belarusian artist and graphic designer. He is the designer of the 1991–1995 Coat of Arms of Belarus, which was a version of the medieval symbol Pahonia.

Jauhien Kulik was born in Minsk. In 1957 he graduated from the Minsk State Arts College, and in 1963 from the Belarusian State Academy of Arts.

After graduation, he worked as a designer and illustrator of books, and participated in numerous personal exhibitions. In the 1960s, he became a leader of an informal group of Belarusian-speaking dissident artists in Minsk. In 1980, he created a Samizdat postcard dedicated to the 1000th anniversary of Belarusian statehood.

Kulik illustrated the first Anatol Titou’s book about the coats of arms of Belarusian towns (1983). Titou’s work of reconstructing the Belarusian heraldic tradition was not welcomed by the Soviet authorities: none of 1,000 copies of the book reached the state-controlled distribution and almost all copies rotted away in a warehouse.

In the late 1980s, he became an active member of the Belarusian Popular Front.

In 1991, after the restoration of the independence of Belarus, Jauhien Kulik was the main designer of the new Coat of Arms of Belarus—the Pahonia.

Jauhien Kulik died in 2002. He is buried in Kalvaryja cemetery in Minsk.
