= List of flags with Russian-language text =

This is a list of flags inscribed with Russian-language text.

Flag	Dates used	Russian text		English translation
Flag	Dates used	Cyrillic	Transliteration	English translation
Armenian SSR	1922	CCPA [abbreviation of "Советская Социалистическая Республика Армянская"]	SSRA [abbreviation of "Sovetskaya Sotsialisticheskaya Respublica Armyanskaya"]	SSRA [abbreviation of "Soviet Socialist Republic of Armenia"]
Azerbaijan ASSR	1921–22	АCCP [abbreviation of "Азербайджанская Советская Социалистическая Республика"]	ASSR [abbreviation of "Azerbaydzhanskaya Sovetskaya Sotsialisticheskaya Respublika"]	ASSR [abbreviation of "Azerbaijan Soviet Socialist Republic"]
Azerbaijan SSR	1940–52	АзCCP [abbreviation of "Азербайджанская Советская Социалистическая Республика"]	AzSSR [abbreviation of "Azerbaydzhanskaya Sovetskaya Sotsialisticheskaya Respublika"]	AzSSR [abbreviation of "Azerbaijan Soviet Socialist Republic"]
Baikonur	–present	БАЙКОНУР	BAYKONUR	BAIKONUR
Bashkir ASSR	1978–90	БАШКИРСКАЯ ACCP	BASHKIRSKAYA ASSR	BASHKIR ASSR
Bukharan People's SR	1920–25	БHCP [abbreviation of "Бухарская Народная Советская Республика"]	BNSR [abbreviation of "Bukharskaya Narodnaya Sovetskaya Respublika"]	BPSR [abbreviation of "Bukharan People's Soviet Republic"]
Socialist Soviet Republic of Byelorussia	1919	CCPБ [abbreviation of "Социалистическая Советская Республика Белорусская"]	SSRB [abbreviation of "Sotsialisticheskaya Sovetskaya Respublika Belorusskaya"]	SSRB [abbreviation of "Socialist Soviet Republic of Byelorussia"]
Byelorussian SSR	1920–27	CCPБ [abbreviation of "Социалистическая Советская Республика Белорусская"]	SSRB [abbreviation of "Sotsialisticheskaya Sovetskaya Respublika Belorusskaya"]	SSRB [abbreviation of "Socialist Soviet Republic of Byelorussia"]
Byelorussian SSR	1927–37	БCCP [abbreviation of "Белорусская Социалистическая Советская Республика"]	BSSR [abbreviation of "Belorusskaya Sotsialisticheskaya Sovetskaya Respublika"]	BSSR [abbreviation of "Byelorussian Socialist Soviet Republic"]
Byelorussian SSR	1937–51	БCCP [abbreviation of "Белорусская Советская Социалистическая Республика"]	BSSR [abbreviation of "Belorusskaya Sovetskaya Sotsialisticheskaya Respublika"]	BSSR [abbreviation of "Byelorussian Soviet Socialist Republic"]
Buryat ASSR	1978–90	БУРЯТСКАЯ ACCP	BURYATSKAYA ASSR	BURYAT ASSR
Chechen-Ingush ASSR	1957–78	ЧИACCP [abbreviation of "Чечено-Ингушская Автономная Советская Социалистическая Республика"]	ChIASSR [abbreviation of "Checheno-Ingushskaya Avtonomnaya Sovetskaya Sotsialisticheskaya Respublika"]	CIASSR [abbreviation of "Chechen-Ingush Autonomous Soviet Socialist Republic"]
Chechen-Ingush ASSR	1978–91	ЧЕЧЕНО-ИНГУШСКАЯ ACCP	CHECHENO-INGUSHSKAYA ASSR	CHECHEN-INGUSH ASSR
Chuvash ASSR	1978–92	ЧУВАШСКАЯ ACCP	CHUVASHSKAYA ASSR	CHUVASH ASSR
Commune of the Working People of Estonia	1918–19	ЭСТЛЯНДСКАЯ ТРУДОВАЯ КОММУНА	ESTLYANDSKAYA TRUDOVAYA KOMMUNA	COMMUNE OF THE WORKING PEOPLE OF ESTONIA
Crimean ASSR	1921–29	К.р.С.С.Р. [abbreviation of "Крымская Социалистическая Советская Республика"]	K.r.S.S.R. [abbreviation of "Krymskaya Sotsialisticheskaya Sovetskaya Respublika"]	Cr.S.S.R. [abbreviation of "Crimean Socialist Soviet Republic"]
Crimean ASSR	1929–37	КрAССР [abbreviation of "Крымская Автономная Социалистическая Советская Республика"]	KrASSR [abbreviation of "Krymskaya Avtonomnaya Sotsialisticheskaya Sovetskaya Respublika"]	CrASSR [abbreviation of "Crimean Autonomous Socialist Soviet Republic"]
Crimean ASSR	1937–39	1. РСФСР; [abbreviation of "Российская Советская Федеративная Социалистическая Республика"]: 2. КрAССР; [abbreviation of "Крымская Автономная Советская Социалистическая Республика"]	1. RSFSR; [abbreviation of "Rossiyskaya Sovetskaya Federativnaya Sotsialisticheskaya Respublika"]: 2. CrASSR; [abbreviation of "Krymskaya Avtonomnaya Sovetskaya Sotsialisticheskaya Respublika"]	1. RSFSR; [abbreviation of "Russian Soviet Federative Socialist Republic"]: 2. CrASSR; [abbreviation of "Crimean Autonomous Soviet Socialist Republic"]
Crimean ASSR	1939–45	1. РСФСР; [abbreviation of "Российская Советская Федеративная Социалистическая Республика"]: 2. КрAССР; [abbreviation of "Крымская Автономная Советская Социалистическая Республика"]	1. RSFSR; [abbreviation of "Rossiyskaya Sovetskaya Federativnaya Sotsialisticheskaya Respublika"]: 2. CrASSR; [abbreviation of "Krymskaya Avtonomnaya Sovetskaya Sotsialisticheskaya Respublika"]	1. RSFSR; [abbreviation of "Russian Soviet Federative Socialist Republic"]: 2. CrASSR; [abbreviation of "Crimean Autonomous Soviet Socialist Republic"]
Dagestan ASSR	1978–91	ДАССР [abbreviation of "Дагестанская Автономная Советская Социалистическая Республика"]	DASSR [abbreviation of "Dagestanskaya Avtonomnaya Sovetskaya Sotsialisticheskaya Respublika"]	DASSR [abbreviation of "Dagestan Autonomous Soviet Socialist Republic"]
Donetsk People's Republic	2014	ДОНЕЦКАЯ РЕСПУБЛИКА	DONETSKAYA RESPUBLIKA	DONETSK REPUBLIC
Donetsk People's Republic	2014–17	ДОНЕЦКАЯ НАРОДНАЯ РЕСПУБЛИКА	DONETSKAYA NARODNAYA RESPUBLIKA	DONETSK PEOPLE'S REPUBLIC
Georgian SSR	1921–22	ССРГ [abbreviation of "Социалистическая Советская Республика Грузинская"]	SSRG [abbreviation of "Sotsialisticheskaya Sovetskaya Respublika Gruzinskaya"]	SSRG [abbreviation of "Socialist Soviet Republic of Georgia"]
Kabardino-Balkar ASSR	1978–91	КАБАРДИНО-БАЛКАРСКАЯ ACCP	KABARDINO-BALKARSKAYA ASSR	KABARDINO-BALKAR ASSR
Kalmyk ASSR	1978–91	КАЛМЫЦКАЯ ACCP	KALMYTSKAYA ASSR	KALMYK ASSR
Karelian ASSR	1978–91	КАРЕЛЬСКАЯ ACCP	KAREL'SKAYA ASSR	KARELIAN ASSR
Karelo-Finnish SSR	1940–53	КАРЕЛО-ФИНСКАЯ CCP	KARELO-FINSKAYA SSR	KARELO-FINNISH SSR
Kazakh ASSR	1920–36	1. РСФСР; [abbreviation of "Российская Советская Федеративная Социалистическая Республика"]: 2. КССР; [abbreviation of "Казахская Социалистическая Советская Республика"]	1. RSFSR; [abbreviation of "Rossiyskaya Sovetskaya Federativnaya Sotsialisticheskaya Respublika"]: 2. KSSR; [abbreviation of "Kazakhskaya Sotsialisticheskaya Sovetskaya Respublika"]	1. RSFSR; [abbreviation of "Russian Soviet Federative Socialist Republic"]: 2. KSSR; [abbreviation of "Kazakh Socialist Soviet Republic"]
Kazakh SSR	1940–53	Казахская ССР	Kazakhskaya SSR	Kazakh SSR
Kazakh SSR	1937–40	КАЗАХСКАЯ CCP	KAZAKHSKAYA SSR	KAZAKH SSR
Kirghiz ASSR	1926–36	KCCP [abbreviation of "Киргизская Aвтономная Социалистическая Советская Республика"]	KSSR [abbreviation of "Kirgizskaya Avtonomnaya Sotsialisticheskaya Sovetskaya Respublika"]	KSSR [abbreviation of "Kirghiz Autonomous Socialist Soviet Republic"]
Kirghiz SSR	1936–52	КИРГИЗСКАЯ CCP	KIRGIZSKAYA SSR	KIRGHIZ SSR
Komi ASSR	1978–90	КОМИ АССР	KOMI ASSR	
Luhansk People's Republic	2014	ЛУГАНСКАЯ РЕСПУБЛИКА	LUGANSKAYA RESPUBLIKA	LUHANSK REPUBLIC
Luhansk People's Republic	2014–17	1. ЛHP; [abbreviation of "Луганская Народная Республика"]: 2. ВОЛЯ СВОБОДНЫХ ЛЮДЕЙ	1. LNR; [abbreviation of "Luganskaya Narodnaya Respublika"]: 2. VOLYA SVOBODNYKH LYUDEY	1. LPR; [abbreviation of "Luhansk People's Republic"]: 2. LIBERTY FREE PEOPLE
Mari ASSR	1978–90	МАРИЙСКАЯ ACCP	MARIYSKAYA ASSR	MARI ASSR
Mariupol	–present	МАРИУПОЛЬ	MARIUPOL'	MARIUPOL
North Ossetian ASSR	1978–90	СЕВЕРО-ОСЕТИНСКАЯ АССР	SEVERO-OSETINSKAYA ASSR	NORTH-OSSETIAN ASSR
Novorossiya	2014–15	1. НОВОРОССИЯ; 2. ВОЛЯ И ТРУД!	1. NOVOROSSIYA; [literally, "New Russia"]: 2. VOLYA I TRUD!	1. NOVOROSSIYA; [literally, "New Russia"]: 2. LIBERTY AND WORK!
Russian SFSR	1918	Россійской Соціалистической Федеративной Совѣтской Республики	Rossiyskoy Sotsialisticheskoy Federativnoy Sovetskoy Respubliki	Russian Socialist Federative Soviet Republic
Russian SFSR	1918–37 (unofficial 1920–37)	РСФСР [abbreviation of "Российская Советская Федеративная Социалистическая Республика"]	RSFSR [abbreviation of "Rossiyskaya Sovetskaya Federativnaya Sotsialisticheskaya Respublika"]	RSFSR [abbreviation of "Russian Soviet Federative Socialist Republic"]
Russian SFSR	1920–37 (official)	Р.С.Ф.С.Р. [abbreviation of "Российская Советская Федеративная Социалистическая Республика"]	R.S.F.S.R. [abbreviation of "Rossiyskaya Sovetskaya Federativnaya Sotsialisticheskaya Respublika"]	R.S.F.S.R. [abbreviation of "Russian Soviet Federative Socialist Republic"]
Russian SFSR	1937–54	РСФСР [abbreviation of "Российская Советская Федеративная Социалистическая Республика"]	RSFSR [abbreviation of "Rossiyskaya Sovetskaya Federativnaya Sotsialisticheskaya Respublika"]	RSFSR [abbreviation of "Russian Soviet Federative Socialist Republic"]
Tajik SSR	1937–40	Таджикская ССР	Tadzhikskaya SSR	Tajik SSR
Tajik SSR	1940–53	Таджикская ССР	Tadzhikskaya SSR	Tajik SSR
Tatar ASSR	1954–81	ТАССР [abbreviation of "Татарская Автономная Советская Социалистическая Республика"]	TASSR [abbreviation of "Tatarskaya Avtonomnaya Sovetskaya Sotsialisticheskaya Respublika"]	TASSR [abbreviation of "Tatar Autonomous Soviet Socialist Republic"]
Transcaucasian SFSR	1930–36	ЗСФСР [abbreviation of "Закавказская Социалистическая Федеративная Советская Республика"]	ZSFSR [abbreviation of "Zakavkazskaya Sotsialisticheskaya Federativnaya Sovetskaya Respublika"]	TSFSR [abbreviation of "Transcaucasian Socialist Federative Soviet Republic"]
Turkmen SSR	1940–53	ТCCP [abbreviation of "Туркменская Советская Социалистическая Республика"]	TSSR [abbreviation of "Turkmenskaya Sovetskaya Sotsialisticheskaya Respublika"]	TSSR [abbreviation of "Turkmen Soviet Socialist Republic"]
Tuvan ASSR	1978–92	ТУВИНСКАЯ ACCP	TUVINSKAYA ASSR	TUVAN ASSR
Udmurt ASSR	1978–90	УДМУРТСКАЯ ACCP	UDMURTSKAYA ASSR	UDMURT ASSR
Ukrainian SSR	1919–29	У.С.С.Р. [abbreviation of "Украинская Советская Социалистическая Республика"]	U.S.S.R. [abbreviation of "Ukrainskaya Sovetskaya Sotsialisticheskaya Respublika"]	U.S.S.R. [abbreviation of "Ukrainian Soviet Socialist Republic"]
Uzbek SSR	1937–41	УЗБЕКСКАЯ CCP	UZBEKSKAYA SSR	UZBEK SSR
Uzbek SSR	1941–53	Узбекская CCP	Uzbekskaya SSR	Uzbek SSR
Volga German ASSR	1938–41	1. Р.С.Ф.С.Р.; [abbreviation of "Российская Советская Федеративная Социалистическая Республика"]: 2. А.С.С.Р. Hемцев Поволжья	1. R.S.F.S.R.; [abbreviation of "Rossiyskaya Sovetskaya Federativnaya Sotsialisticheskaya Respublika"]: 2. A.S.S.R. Nemtsev Povolzh'ya	1. R.S.F.S.R.; [abbreviation of "Russian Soviet Federative Socialist Republic"]: 2. Volga German A.S.S.R.
Yakut ASSR	1978–91	ЯКУТСКАЯ ACCP	YAKUTSKAYA ASSR	YAKUT ASSR
Yalta	–present	ЮЖНАЯ СТОЛИЦА	YUZHNAYA STOLITSA	SOUTH CAPITAL

== See also ==
- List of inscribed flags
