= Emblem of the Byelorussian Soviet Socialist Republic =

Versions
- 1958-1981
- Armiger: Byelorussian Soviet Socialist Republic
- Adopted: 1937
- Crest: Red star
- Supporters: Stalks of wheat, clover and flax
- Motto: Пралетарыі ўсіх краін, яднайцеся! (Belarusian); Пролетарии всех стран, соединяйтесь! (Russian) "Workers of the world, unite!"
- Earlier version

The Byelorussian SSR emblem was used as the coat of arms of the Soviet Socialist Republic until the fall of the Soviet Union. The coat of arms is based on the coat of arms of the Soviet Union.

== Description ==
The central feature of the emblem is the crossed hammer and sickle, the universal Communist symbol signifying the unity of the worker and the peasant. Below the hammer and sickle is a globe, which is superimposed atop a rising sun. Wheat ears surround the central device, with flowers on each ear; clover on the left and flax on the right. A red ribbon is wrapped around the wheat ears, signifying the red flag used by the Communist movement. At the base of the emblem, the letters БССР (BSSR) appear, shorthand for the full name of the republic, Byelorussian Soviet Socialist Republic (Беларуская Савецкая Сацыялістычная Рэспубліка Bielaruskaja Savieckaja Sacyjalistyčnaja Respublika), shown only once, since it reads the same in both Russian and Belarusian. On each side of the ribbon, the USSR State motto (Workers of the world, unite!) appear in Belarusian on the left (Пралетарыі ўсіх краін, яднайцеся! Pralietaryi ŭsich krain jadnajciesia!) and in Russian on the right (Пролетарии всех стран, соединяйтесь!). At the top of the emblem, a red star for Communism is present.

== History ==
The Byelorussian SSR had a coat of arms since 1926, yet the last emblem that was used was adopted in the 1980s. The earliest version also had the text in Yiddish (!פּראָלעטאַריער פֿון אַלע לענדער, פֿאַרײניקט זיך) and Polish (Proletariusze wszystkich krajów, łączcie się!). Other than that, the latest emblem and the earliest emblem only differed in minor details. The 1950s arms was designed by Ivan Dubasov, People's Artist of the USSR. During the first years of the SSR the emblem shared basically the same background as the ones of the Russian SFSR and the Ukrainian SSR before the first version of the arms was used.

After independence, Belarus adopted the Pahonia as the national coat of arms. This changed under the presidency of Alexander Lukashenko after a controversial 1995 referendum in which the basic Soviet design was reintroduced with the outline map of Belarus replacing the hammer and sickle.

== Gallery ==
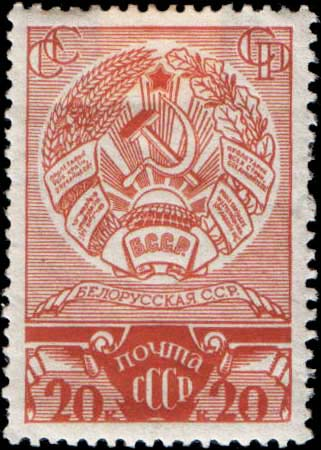
Arms of the Byelorussian SSR on a 1937 postage stamp

Pahonia, the arms of Belarus in 1918 and in 1991-1995

Belarusian national emblem since 1995

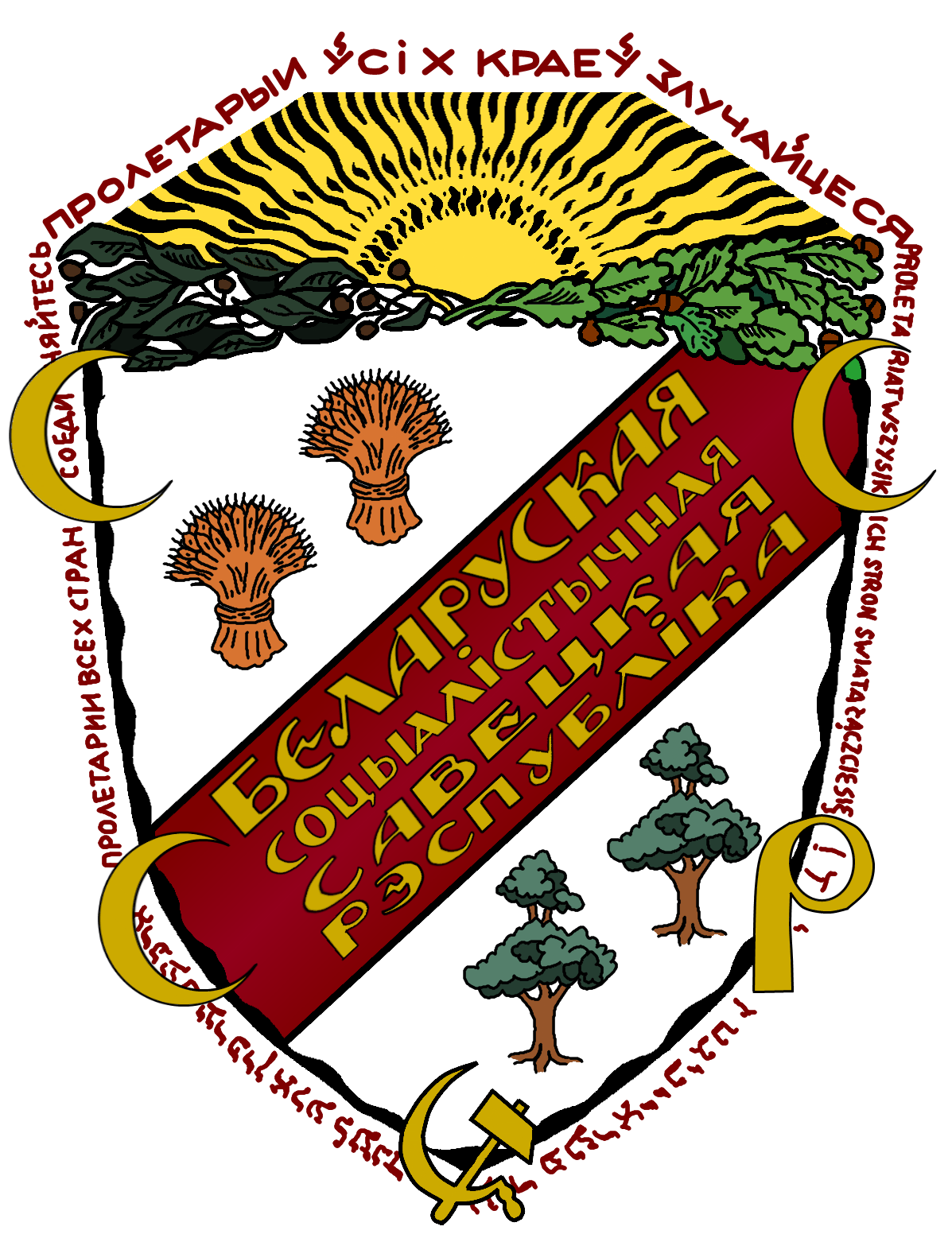
1924 proposal for the coat of arms

== See also ==
- National emblem of Belarus
- National symbols of Belarus
