= Flag of the Byelorussian Soviet Socialist Republic =

Soviet republic flag from 1919 to 1991

Byelorussian Soviet Socialist Republic
- Use: Civil and state flag, civil and state ensign
- Proportion: 1:2
- Adopted: 25 December 1951
- Relinquished: 19 September 1991
- Design: An unequal horizontal bicolour of red over green in a 2:1 ratio and the golden hammer and sickle with the bordered star on the canton, with a white ornamental pattern on a red vertical stripe at the hoist.
- Designed by: Nikolai Gusev (artist)
- Reverse flag
- Use: Civil and state flag, civil and state ensign
- Бел-чырвона-белы сцяг ("The White, Red and White Flag")
- Flag of the Byelorussian SSR (1991) and the Republic of Belarus (1991–1995)
- Use: National flag
- Proportion: 1:2
- Adopted: 19 September 1991
- Relinquished: 7 June 1995
- Design: A horizontal triband of white (top and bottom) and red.
- Designed by: Klaudzi Duzh-Dusheuski

The Flag of the Byelorussian Soviet Socialist Republic (Note: Belarusian: Сцяг Беларускай Савецкай Сацыялістычнай Рэспублікі; Russian: Флаг Белорусской Советской Социалистической Республики) was adopted on 25 December 1951. Prior to this, the flag was red with the Cyrillic characters БССР (BSSR) in gold in the top-left corner, surrounded by a gold border. Between 1937 and the adoption of the above flag in the 1940s, the flag was the same, but with a gold hammer and sickle above the Cyrillic characters and no border. Between 1919 and 1927, the flag was red, with the Cyrillic characters ССРБ (SSRB) in the top left-hand corner. In early 1919, a plain red flag was used. The final BSSR flag was used until the collapse of the Soviet Union in 1991. A flag based on this Soviet design is used as the national flag of Belarus.

== Design on the 1951 flag ==
In the end of the 1940s, the political need had arisen to have somewhat visually different designs of the flags of the USSR republics, especially for those that were UN members. For the BSSR flag, the image of the Belarusian folk design was chosen as a distinctive feature of the flag. The picture of the embroidery on the «ruchnik» (handtowel) had been found in the pre-World War II archives of the Belpramsavyet. The embroidery had been made in 1917 by peasant Ms. Matrona Markyevich of the village Kastsilishcha of the Sennin region, and had been named «The Rising Sun». Nikolai Gusev (artist), who previously cooperated with the German occupation administration during World War II had prepared the project of the BSSR flag, basing it on the embroidery, with several symbolic elements added.

Symbolically, the design on the BSSR flag is decoded as follows (considering design strip positioned horizontally):

- the central rhombus figure symbolises the rising Sun;
- the horn-like figures to the left and right of it symbolise wealth and welfare;
- the figure inside of the rhombus is the "key to happiness";
- the rectangular figure with the smaller rectangles adjoining from the left and right is the "votive sign", expressing the desire for fulfillment of hopes;
- the pattern figure symbolises bread (it was absent from the original embroidery, added after some discussion).

Note: All proper names and places' names in this article are rendered in BGN/PCGN.

== Color scheme ==
Byelorussian Soviet Socialist Republic	Red	Green	White	Gold
RGB	205/0/0	0/153/51	255/255/255	255/217/0
Hexadecimal	#CD0000	#009933	#FFFFFF	#FFD900
CMYK	0/100/100/20	100/0/67/40	0/0/0/0	0/15/100/0
Pantone (approximate)	3546 C	355 XGC	P 75-1 U	Medium Yellow C

== Previous flags of the Soviet era ==
Before 1951, several different flags had been in use since the Revolution. The earliest flag was plain red, and was used in 1919 during the existence of the Lithuanian–Byelorussian SSR. After the formation of the Byelorussian SSR, the lettering ССРБ (SSRB) was added in gold to the top hoist. This design was changed in 1937, when a hammer and sickle and red star were placed above the letters; at the same time, the typeface was changed, and the text of the lettering was altered to БССР (BSSR). During the 1940s, the hammer and sickle and red star were removed from the flag, and a gold border was added to the letters. This flag remained in use until the adoption of the 1951 flag. In August 1991, the white-red-white flag was reintroduced as the new flag of the newly independent Belarus. In 1995, the 1951 version was reused with minor changes: the communist symbol was removed and the white-in-red ornament changed to a red-in-white one.

== Gallery ==
27 Feb 1919 – 1 Apr 1919

3 Feb 1919 – 11 Apr 1927

11 Apr 1927 – 19 Feb 1937

19 Feb 1937 – 25 Dec 1951

25 Dec 1951 – 19 Sep 1991

19 Sep 1991 – 10 Dec 1991

== See also ==
- Coat of arms of the Byelorussian Soviet Socialist Republic
- Flag of Belarus
- Flag of the Soviet Union
- National symbols of Belarus
