= Flag of Belarus =

Republic of Belarus
- Use: National flag and ensign
- Proportion: 1:2
- Adopted: 25 December 1951; 74 years ago (Soviet design); 7 June 1995; 31 years ago (original design with a thinner ornament pattern); 10 February 2012; 14 years ago (current design with a thicker ornament pattern)
- Design: An unequal horizontal bicolour of red over green in a 2:1 ratio, with a red ornamental pattern on a white vertical stripe at the hoist.
- Designed by: Nikolai Gusev
- Variant of the Belarusian national flag
- Use: Presidential standard
- Proportion: 1:1.2

The national flag of Belarus is an unequal red-green bicolour with a red-on-white ornament pattern placed at the hoist (staff) end. The current design was introduced in 2012 by the State Committee for Standardisation of the Republic of Belarus, and is adapted from a design approved in a May 1995 referendum. It is a modification of the 1951 flag used while the country was a republic of the Soviet Union. Changes made to the Soviet-era flag were the removal of communist symbols – the hammer and sickle and the red star – as well as the reversal of the colours in the ornament pattern. Since the 1995 referendum, several flags used by Belarusian government officials and agencies have been modelled on this national flag.

Historically, the white-red-white flag was used by the Belarusian People's Republic in 1918 before Belarus became a Soviet Republic, then by several formations of the Belarusian national movement, including participants of the Slutsk Uprising and units commanded by Stanisław Bułak-Bałachowicz followed by use during the Nazi occupation of Belarus between 1943 and 1944, and again after it regained its independence in 1991 until the (disputed) 1995 referendum. Opposition groups have continued to use this flag. However, the Belarusian government has prohibited its use, claiming it is linked with Belarusian collaborators who adopted the flag during World War II. The white-red-white flag has been used in protests against the government, most recently the 2020–2021 Belarusian protests, and by the Belarusian diaspora.

== Design ==
The basic design of the national flag of Belarus was first described in Presidential Decree No. 214 of 7 June 1995. The flag is a rectangular cloth consisting of two horizontal stripes: a red upper stripe (which was inspired by the flag of the Soviet Union) covering two-thirds of the flag's height, and additional green lower stripe covering one-third. An additional vertical red-on-white traditional Belarusian decorative pattern, which occupies one-ninth of the flag's length, is placed against the flagstaff. The flag's ratio of width to length is 1:2. The flag does not differ significantly from the flag of the Byelorussian Soviet Socialist Republic (Byelorussian SSR), other than the removal of the hammer and sickle and the red star, as well as the reversal of red and white in the hoist pattern, from white-on-red to red-on-white. While there is no official interpretation for the colours of the flag, an explanation given by President Alexander Lukashenko is that red represents freedom and the sacrifice of the nation's forefathers, while green represents life.

In addition to the 1995 decree, "STB 911-2008: National Flag of the Republic of Belarus" was published by the State Committee for Standardisation of the Republic of Belarus in 2008. It gives the technical specifications of the national flag, such as the details of the colours and the ornament pattern. The red ornament design on the national flag was, until 2012, 1/12 the width of the flag, and 1/9 with the white margin. As of 2012, the red pattern has occupied the whole of the white margin (which stayed at 1/9).

=== Colours ===
The colours of the national flag are regulated in "STB 911-2008: National Flag of the Republic of Belarus" and are listed in the CIE Standard illuminant D65.

Standard Colour Sample of the National Flag
Colour	Colour coordinate		Y_{10}
Colour	x_{10}	y_{10}	Y_{10}
Red	0.553 ± 0.010	0.318 ± 0.010	14.8 ± 1.0
Green	0.297 ± 0.010	0.481 ± 0.010	29.6 ± 1.0

2012–present	Green	Red
Pantone	355 C	1795 C
CMYK	93-0-100-0	0-96-82-1
HEX	#009739	#D22730
RGB	0-151-57	210-39-48

=== Hoist ornament pattern ===
Decorative pattern on the Flag of Belarus that resembles rushnyk

A decorative pattern, designed in 1917 by Matrona Markevich, is displayed on the hoist of the flag (as it was previously, on the 1951 flag). The pattern, derived from local plants and flowers, is a traditional type commonly used in Belarus. These patterns are sometimes used in woven garments, most importantly in the traditional rushnyk, a woven cloth used for ceremonial events such as religious services, weddings, and other more minor social functions, such as a host offering guests bread and salt served on a ručnik.

The husband of Matrona Markevich was arrested for anti-Soviet propaganda and executed during Soviet repression in Belarus in 1937, after which the family was dekulakised. The original rushnyk has not survived and was either confiscated by the NKVD in 1937 or destroyed during World War II. The brother of Matrona Markevich, Mikhail Katsar, head of the ethnography and folklore department at the Academy of Sciences of Belarus, was included into the commission that was ordered to create a new flag for the Belarusian SSR in 1951. A monument to Matrona Markevich was erected in Sianno in 2015.

== Protocol ==
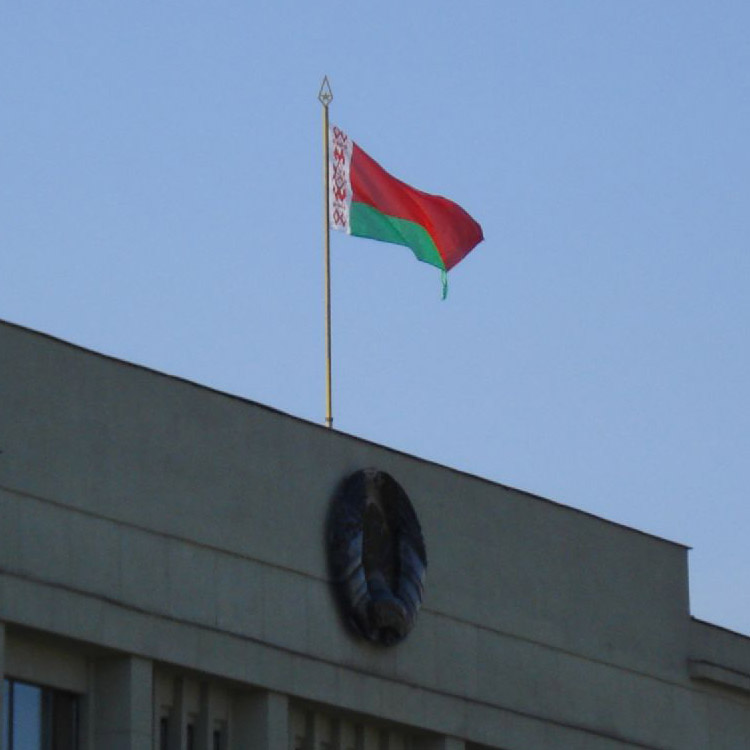
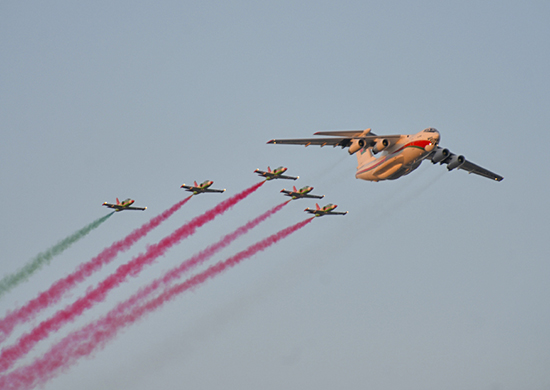
(Left) The flag with the Soviet-style star in a diamond finial waving above a government building in Minsk; (Right) The colours of the Belarusian flag being interpreted during a flypast of the Belarusian Air Force during the Independence Day Parade in honor of the 75th anniversary of the Liberation of Belarus

Belarusian law requires that the flag be flown daily, weather permitting, from the following locations:

- The residence of the president of Belarus
- The buildings of the National Assembly of Belarus (Council of the Republic and House of Representatives)
- The building of the Council of Ministers of Belarus
- Courts of Belarus
- Offices of local executive and administrative bodies
- Above buildings in which sessions of local Councils of deputies take place (during the meetings)
- Military bases or military ships
- Belarusian embassies and consulates
- Checkpoints and posts at the borders of Belarus

The Belarusian flag is also officially flown on the sites of special occasions:

- Sessions of local executive and administrative bodies
- Voting/polling places
- Sports arenas during competitions (although the IOC has its own rules on flag display)

Belarusian diplomats and various government officials (such as the President and the Prime Minister) display the flag on vehicles. On special occasions, such as memorial services and family holidays, and it can be used at ceremonies and events hosted by public organisations, companies, and NGOs. The regulations were issued in the same decree that defined the Belarusian flag. The national flag has been incorporated into the badge of the guard units in the Belarusian armed forces. The pole should be three times longer than the width of the flag.

According to the 1995 presidential decree, the national flag is to be used on a staff that is coloured gold (ochre). Other parts of the protocol specify the finial (the metal ornament on a flag pole) as diamond-shaped and coloured in a yellow metal. In this diamond there is a five-pointed star (similar to that used in the national emblem). The diamond pattern represents another continuation of Soviet flag traditions. The Day of the National Emblem and Flag of Belarus (Note: Belarusian: Дзень дзяржаўнага гербу і дзяржаўнага сцягу Рэспублікі Беларусь, Russian: День Государственного герба и Государственного флага Республики Беларусь) is 15 May.

== Historical flags ==
=== White-red-white flag ===
The white-red-white flag of the Belarusian People's Republic (1918), the Byelorussian SSR (1990–1991), and the Republic of Belarus (1991–1995)

The white-red-white flag was used by the Belarusian People's Republic in 1918 before Belarus became a Soviet Republic, then by several formations of the Belarusian national movement, including participants of the Slutsk Uprising and units commanded by Stanisław Bułak-Bałachowicz followed by use during the Nazi occupation of Belarus between 1943 and 1944, and again after it regained its independence in 1991 until the (disputed) 1995 referendum.

Opposition groups have continued to use this flag, though its display in Belarus has been prohibited by the government of Belarus, which claims it is linked with Nazi collaboration due to its use by Belarusian collaborators during World War II. The white-red-white flag has been used in protests against the government, most recently the 2020–2021 Belarusian protests, and by the Belarusian diaspora.

=== Soviet era ===
==== 1919–1951 ====
Before 1951, several different flags had been in use since the Revolution. The earliest flag was plain red, and was used in 1919 during the existence of the Lithuanian–Byelorussian Soviet Socialist Republic. After the formation of the Byelorussian SSR, the lettering ССРБ (SSRB) was added in gold to the top hoist. This design was established with the passage of the first Constitution of the Byelorussian SSR. It was later modified in the 1927 Constitution where the letters were changed to БССР (BSSR) but kept the overall design the same. This design was changed in 1937, when a hammer and sickle and red star were placed above the letters. The flag dimensions were also formally established as 1:2 for the first time. This flag remained in use until the adoption of the 1951 flag, which did away with the letters.

Lithuanian–Byelorussian SSR
1919–1920

Byelorussian SSR
1919–1927

Byelorussian SSR
1927–1937

Byelorussian SSR
1937–1951

==== 1951–1991 ====
Flag of the Byelorussian Soviet Socialist Republic (1951–1991)

The flag of the Byelorussian SSR was adopted by decree on 25 December 1951. The flag was slightly modified in 1956 when construction details were added for the red star and the golden hammer and sickle. The final specifications of the flag was set in Article 120 of the Constitution of the Byelorussian SSR and are very similar to the current Belarusian flag. The flag had a length-to-width ratio of one to two (1:2), just like the flag of the Soviet Union (and the other fourteen union republics). The main portion of the flag was red (representing the Revolution), with the rest being green (representing the Belarusian forests). A pattern of white drawn on red decorated the hoist portion of the flag; this design is often used on Belarusian traditional costumes. In the upper corner of the flag, in the red portion, a gold hammer and sickle was added, with a red star outlined in gold above it. The hammer represented the worker, and the sickle the peasant; according to Soviet ideology, these two symbols crossed together symbolised co-operation between the two classes. The red star, a symbol commonly used by Communist parties, was said to stand either for the five social groups (workers, youth, peasants, military, and academics), the five known continents, or the five fingers of the worker's hand. The hammer, sickle and star were sometimes not displayed on the reverse of the flag. The purpose for this design was that the Byelorussian SSR, along with the Soviet Union and the Ukrainian SSR, were admitted to the United Nations in 1945 as founding members and needed distinct flags for each other. The designer of the flag was Nikolai Gusev (artist), who previously cooperated with the German occupation administration during World War II.

=== 1995 referendum ===
Flag adopted in 1995, slightly modified in 2012

Flag proposed by Lukashenko in 1995

The referendum that was held to adopt the state symbols took place on 14 May 1995. With a voter turnout of 64.7%, the new flag was approved by a majority in the ratio of three to one (75.1% to 24.9%). The other three questions were also passed by the voters. The way of carrying out the referendum as well as the legality of questioning the national symbols on a referendum was heavily criticised by the opposition, with some people, such as former judge of the Constitutional Court of Belarus, Mikhail Pastukhov, and former parliament member Siarhei Navumchyk, even stating that the Pahonia and the white-red-white flag, are still the de jure symbols of Belarus, due to the referendum's dubious nature. Supporters of the Pahonia also criticize that the Pahonia and the former white-red-white flag were compared to ones used by collaborationist forces during World War II in propaganda that was published during the run-up to the vote. Opposition parties claimed that only 48.7% of the entire voting population (75.1% of the 64.7% who showed at the polling stations) supported the adoption of the new flag, but Belarusian law (as in many other countries) states that only a majority of voters is needed to decide on a referendum issue. Upon the results going in favor of President Lukashenko, he proclaimed that the return of the Soviet-style flag brought a sense of youth and pleasant memories to the nation.

Lukashenko had tried to hold a similar referendum before, in 1993, but failed to get parliamentary support. Two months before the May 1995 referendum, Lukashenko proposed a flag design that consisted of two small bars of green and one wide bar of red. While it is not known what became of this suggestion, new designs (called "projects" in Belarus) were suggested a few days later, which were then put up to vote in the 1995 referendum.

== Other related flags ==
Presidential standard

Flag of the Armed Forces of Belarus

The flag variant features two red stripes along the decorative edges

Since the introduction of the 1995 flag, several other flags adopted by government agencies or bodies have been modelled on it.

The presidential standard, which has been in use since 1997, was adopted by a decree called "Concerning the Standard of the President of Republic of Belarus". The standard's design is an exact copy of the national flag, with the addition of the Belarusian national emblem in gold and red. The standard's ratio of 5:6 differs from that of the national flag, making the standard almost square. It is used at buildings and on vehicles to denote the presence of the president.

In 2001, President Lukashenko issued a decree granting a flag to the Armed Forces of Belarus. The flag, which has a ratio of 1:1.7, has the national ornamental pattern along the length of the hoist side of the flag. On the front of the flag is the Belarusian coat of arms, with the wording УЗБРОЕНЫЯ СІЛЫ ("Armed Forces") arched over it, and РЭСПУБЛІКІ БЕЛАРУСЬ ("of Republic of Belarus") written below; the text of both is in gold. On the reverse of the flag, the centre contains the symbol of the armed forces, which is a red star surrounded by a wreath of oak and laurel. Above the symbol is the phrase ЗА НАШУ РАДЗІМУ ("For our Motherland"), while below is the full name of the military unit.
