= Belarusian heraldry =

The use of heraldry in Belarus is used by government bodies, subdivisions of the national government, organizations, corporations and by families.

== History ==
Until it was absorbed into the Soviet Union, Belarus as the Belarusian Democratic Republic was represented by a coat of arms: a charging knight on a red field, called the Vytis or Pahonia ('the Chase').

Throughout the communist period, coats of arms fell out of favor and were replaced by emblems. The cities still used shields, but these were changed to add socialist realism or to announce the state awards each city earned.

Once the Soviet Union fell apart in 1991, the Pahonia was restored as the state coat of arms and the cities reverted to old coat of arms or created new designs. Each of the seven voblasts of Belarus has its own coat of arms. Historical achievements, state awards or state symbols are placed on the coat of arms. For example, the enterprise "October" features the state flag of Belarus on their coat of arms.. By 1995, Belarus had reverted its Coat of Arms to Soviet-era style emblem.

== State symbols ==
Emblem of Belarus since 1995 (with minor modifications in 2012 and 2020)

Coat of arms of Belarus (Pahonia) used between 1991 and 1995

Emblem of the Byelorussian SSR (with modifications in 1937, 1938, 1949, 1958 and 1981)

Coat of arms of Belarus as used on the passports of the Belarusian Democratic Republic from 1918

== Civic heraldry ==
There have been several waves of Belarusian cities receiving coats of arms. Firstly, many cities received coats of arms under the Magdeburg Law during the times of the Grand Duchy of Lithuania and the Polish–Lithuanian Commonwealth.

After the Partitions of Poland, territories in modern-day Belarus were incorporated into the Russian Empire. In the late 18th century and during the 19th century, the authorities of the Russian Empire assigned new coats of arms to most Belarusian cities, often aiming to emphasize the cities' conquest by the Russians.

In the Belarusian SSR era, cities didn't have any official coats of arms. In the late years of the USSR, Russian-Empire-era coats of arms were sporadically used as informal symbols.

After the restoration of the independence of Belarus in 1991, the cities of Belarus have restored the official usage of coats of arms. Most cities have restored the initial medieval coats of arms, fewer have restored the coats of arms granted during the Russian Empire.

City	Current coat of arms	Historical coat of arms	Coat of arms introduced by the Russian Empire
Miensk			
Bierascie			
Homiel			
Horadnia			
Mahilow			
Viciebsk			

== Regional heraldry ==
=== Medieval history ===
During the times of the Grand Duchy of Lithuania and later the Polish–Lithuanian Commonwealth, the Vytis has been the dominating symbol on the coats of arms on the provinces on the territory of today's Belarus.

Navahrudak Voivodeship

Vilnius Voivodeship

Brest Litovsk Voivodeship

Podlaskie Voivodeship (1513–1795)

Minsk Voivodeship

Polock Voivodeship

Witebsk Voivodeship

Banner of the Mstsislaw Voivodeship

=== Under the Russian Empire ===
After the annexation of the Grand Duchy of Lithuania (including territories of present-day Belarus) to the Russian Empire, new administrative divisions (gubernyas, or governorates) were introduced. Vitebsk and Vilnius governorates inherited coats of arms of their former voivodeships.

Vilna Governorate

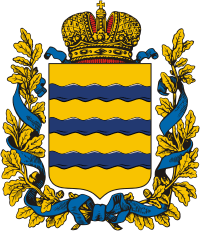
Minsk Governorate

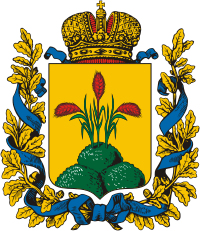
Mogilev Governorate

Grodno Governorate

Vitebsk Governorate

=== Independent Belarus ===
After the restoration of the independence of Belarus, the regions received new coats of arms, mostly based on the coats of the Russian-era governorates.

City of Minsk

Brest Region

Homiel Region

Hrodna Region

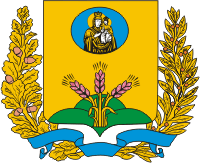
Mahiloŭ Region

Minsk Region

Viciebsk Region

== Personal heraldry ==
See Armorial of Polish nobility

The nobility of the historical regions of modern Belarus, which comprise parts of Lithuania propria and White Ruthenia, were a historical part of the Lithuanian nobility and Ruthenian nobility in the Grand Duchy of Lithuania. Very early, the nobility of the Grand Duchy of Lithuania adopted the heraldic tradition of the Polish szlachta. The heraldry of the said nobility constitutes a part of the Polish heraldry.

Brochwicz

Bukaty

=== Ecclesiastic heraldry ===
The Belarusian Roman Catholic senior clergy has personal coats of arms as according to the customs of catholic ecclesiastical heraldry.

Tadevuš Kandrusievič, Archbishop of Minsk and Mahilow, consecrated in 1989

Alaksandar Jašewski, auxiliary bishop of Minsk and Mahiloŭ

Jury Kasabucki, auxiliary bishop of Minsk and Mahiloŭ

Bishop Alaksandar Kaškievič of Hrodna

Aleh Butkievič, bishop of Viciebsk

== See also ==
- Lithuanian nobility
- National symbols of Lithuania
- Polish heraldry
- List of coats of arms of Polish nobility
- History of Belarus
- Coat of arms of Belarus
- Ruthenia
- Ruthenian nobility
- Belarusian name
