= Ivan Dubasov =

Russian artist (1897–1988)

Ivan Dubasov Иван Дубасов
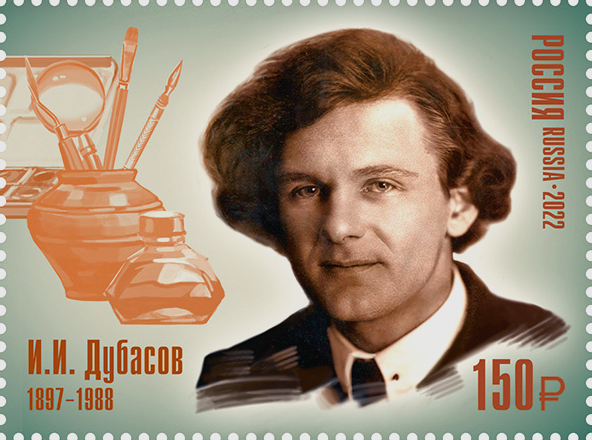
- Dubasov on a 2022 stamp of Russia

Chief Artist of Goznak
- In office 16 February 1932 – 1 February 1971
- Succeeded by: Sergei Pomansky

Personal details
- Born: 30 November 1897 Odintsovo, Moscow Oblast, Imperial Russia
- Died: 15 March 1988 (aged 90) Moscow, Russian SFSR, Soviet Union
- Party: Communist Party of the Soviet Union
- Education: Stroganov School of Arts

Ivan Ivanovich Dubasov (Russian: Иван Иванович Дубасов; 30 November 1897 – 15 March 1988) was a Russian Soviet artist. He was the head artist of the Goznak from 1932 to 1971 and was made an Honoured Worker of the Arts Industry of the RSFSR in 1959.

He developed sketches and designs for multiple Soviet banknotes, stamps, orders, medals, awards and decorations over several decades. During 1943-1945 Goznak was entrusted with a number of important tasks to create banknotes, not only for the USSR, but also for the new socialist countries that appeared after the end of the war. In the GDR, Mongolia, Poland, China, Czechoslovakia, Albania for dozens of years the money, sketches for which were made by Ivan Dubasov, were used.

Ivan Dubasov was awarded the Order of Lenin (1945), the Order of the Red Banner of Labour (1951), the Order of the Badge of Honour and a number of other medals and decorations.
