= Annovka =

Annovka may refer to the following rural localities in Russia:

- Annovka, Amur Oblast
- Annovka, Belgorod Oblast
- Annovka, Voronezh Oblast
- Annovka, Baltachevsky District, Republic of Bashkortostan
- Annovka, Belebeyevsky District, Republic of Bashkortostan
- Annovka, Buzdyaksky District, Republic of Bashkortostan
- Annovka, Kuyurgazinsky District, Republic of Bashkortostan
- Annovka, Zilairsky District, Republic of Bashkortostan
