= Socialist-style emblems =

Coat of arms with communist symbolism

The national emblem of China is typical of socialist and communist heraldry. The colour red and the star are symbols of communism; grains are often used to represent agriculture, farmers, or the common people, the cogwheel or other industrial tools represent the industrial proletariat.

Socialist-style emblems usually follow a unique style consisting of communist symbolism. Although commonly referred to as coats of arms, most are not actually traditional heraldic achievements. Many communist governments purposely diverged from heraldic tradition in order to distance themselves from the monarchies that they usually replaced, with coats of arms being seen as symbols of the monarchs.

Soviet Russia was the first state to use a socialist-style emblem, beginning at its creation in 1917. The style became more widespread after World War II, when many other communist states were established. Even a few non-socialist (or communist) states have adopted the style, for various reasons—usually because communists had helped them to gain independence or establish their republican governments. After the fall of the Soviet Union and the other communist states in Eastern Europe between 1989 and 1992, this style of state emblems was often abandoned in favour of the old heraldic practices, with many (but not all) of the new governments reinstating traditional heraldry that was previously cast aside.

== Origin and history ==
Soviet leaders sought to distinguish their insignia from the emblems used by the Russian Emperor and aristocracy. They replaced and omitted the traditional heraldic devices, substituting an emblem that did not conform to traditional European practices.

The Soviet Union, created after the 1917 revolution, required insignia to represent itself in line with other sovereign states, such as emblems, flags and seals, but the Soviet leaders did not wish to continue the old heraldic practices which they saw as associated with the societal system the revolution sought to replace. In response to the needs and wishes, the national emblem adopted would lack the traditional heraldic elements of a shield, helm, crest and mantling, and instead be presented more plainly. This style was followed then by other socialist and communist states, which wished to also focus attention on the nation's workers and diverge from feudalism and all of its associations.

In some communist countries, the socialist style of emblems was never adopted fully. The coat of arms of Poland was only changed slightly under the communist era, retaining the traditional heraldic form. In Hungary, the "Rákosi badge", an emblem in the socialist style, was adopted following the Second World War, but after the 1956 uprising, a new emblem ("Kádár badge") was created combining communist symbolism with a heraldic shield in the colours of the Hungarian flag. Czechoslovakia became a Communist country in 1948 but retained its original coat of arms until 1960-1961, when they were replaced with a non-traditional shield depicting the heraldic Bohemian lion without a crown and with a red star above head. Some of the states of Yugoslavia also used heraldic shields coupled with socialist imagery in their emblems, as did two republics within the USSR: the Russian Soviet Federative Socialist Republic and the Ukrainian Soviet Socialist Republic. In several Latin American countries that experienced Communist revolutions, such as Cuba and Nicaragua, the traditional Coat of Arms remained with minor changes.

== Characteristics ==
Socialist style of state emblems typically makes use of the following symbols:

- Hammer and sickle, representing respectively the workers and peasantry. In some countries, the sickle may be replaced by another traditional tool for local agriculture, most often a hoe. More rarely, a hammer may be used on its own, to represent the working classes as a whole.
- The five-pointed Red star, representing the five fingers of the worker's hand and the five continents on the earth. Often displayed with a yellow border, or a yellow five-pointed star, often on a red background
- Wreaths of grain or other domesticated plants encircling the emblem, representing agriculture and plenty
- Interwoven ribbons in national or red colors, sometimes used for a motto
- The rising sun, representing revolution
- Modern industrial accessories such as gears and electricity pylons
- Books, representing the intelligentsia, and more generally, science and culture
- Local landscapes
- Other tools or accessories, sometimes weapons. However, the latter is more characteristic of national liberation movement symbolism than of traditional Socialist heraldic style.

Emblems following this style generally have a circular or oval shape.

== Present ==
The physical emblem of Vietnam being used by the country's National Assembly Building.

With the dissolution of the Eastern Bloc in Europe, most of these countries' socialist emblems have been replaced with old pre-communist symbols or by wholly new coats of arms.

The socialist style's influence is still seen in the emblems of several countries, especially in most existing communist states, such as the People's Republic of China. North Korea has a national emblem in pure socialist style, as do Vietnam and Laos.

During the infancy years of the Russian Federation (the successor to the Soviet Union), the country used the modified version of the emblem of the RSFSR with the inscription was changed from RSFSR (РСФСР) to the Russian Federation (Российская Федерация/Rossiyskaya Federaciya) until the new coat of arms was adopted in 1993. The national emblem of Belarus was adopted in 1995 following a controversial referendum. It is reminiscent of that of the Byelorussian SSR and replaced the coat of arms of 1991–1995 which followed the traditional heraldic style. Tajikistan and Uzbekistan also retained components of their respective former Soviet republics' emblems.

The national emblem of North Macedonia is reminiscent of that of the Socialist Republic of Macedonia (once a constituent socialist republic of the Socialist Federal Republic of Yugoslavia), having removed the red star from it in 2009.

In Africa, the emblems of the former Portuguese colonies of Angola and Mozambique, as well as Guinea-Bissau, follow the socialist-style emblems formula.

The Republic of Serbia used the coat of arms of the Socialist Republic of Serbia until the recommended symbols by the National Assembly on 17 August 2004. The recommended usage was made into law on 11 May 2009 thus officially replacing the socialist emblem.

The unrecognized state of Transnistria has a state emblem based on a Soviet-era design, despite not being a socialist state. The pattern also applies to the self-declared Luhansk People's Republic.

== Galleries ==
Below are galleries of historical and current national emblems. The years given are for the emblems, not for the countries.

This is not an exhaustive gallery, since they are here to illustrate the article, not to show every example. Only long-lasting emblems of independent countries are shown.

=== Current emblems ===
Emblem of the People's Republic of China (1950–present)

Emblem of Vietnam (1955–present)

Emblem of Laos (2025–present)

Emblem of North Korea (1993–present)

Emblem of Angola (1990–present)

National emblem of Belarus (2020–present)

National Emblem of Bangladesh (1972–present)

Emblem of Guinea-Bissau (1994–present)

Emblem of Mozambique (1990–present)

Emblem of Nepal (2008–present)

National emblem of North Macedonia (2009–present)

Emblem of Tajikistan (1993–present)

Emblem of Uzbekistan (1992–present)

Emblem of Djibouti (1977–present)

Emblem of Turkmenistan (2003–present)

Emblem of Kazakhstan (2018–present)

Emblem of Kyrgyzstan (2016–present)

Emblem of Madagascar (2011–present)

National emblem of Timor-Leste (2002–present)

==== Non-UN member states or subnational divisions with socialist-styled emblems ====
Emblem of Transnistria (1991–present)

Coat of arms of Western Sahara (1991–present)

Emblem of Adygea

Emblem of Altai Krai

Emblem of Bryansk Oblast

Emblem of Chechnya

Emblem of Gagauzia (1994–present)

Emblem of Kemerovo Oblast

Emblem of the Luhansk People's Republic (2014–present)

Emblem of Mordovia

Emblem of Volgograd Oblast

Emblem of Wa State (1989–present)

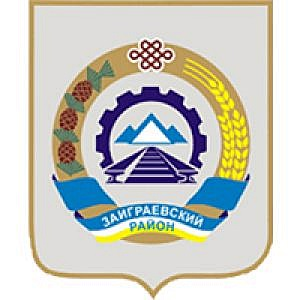
Emblem of Zaigrayevsky District

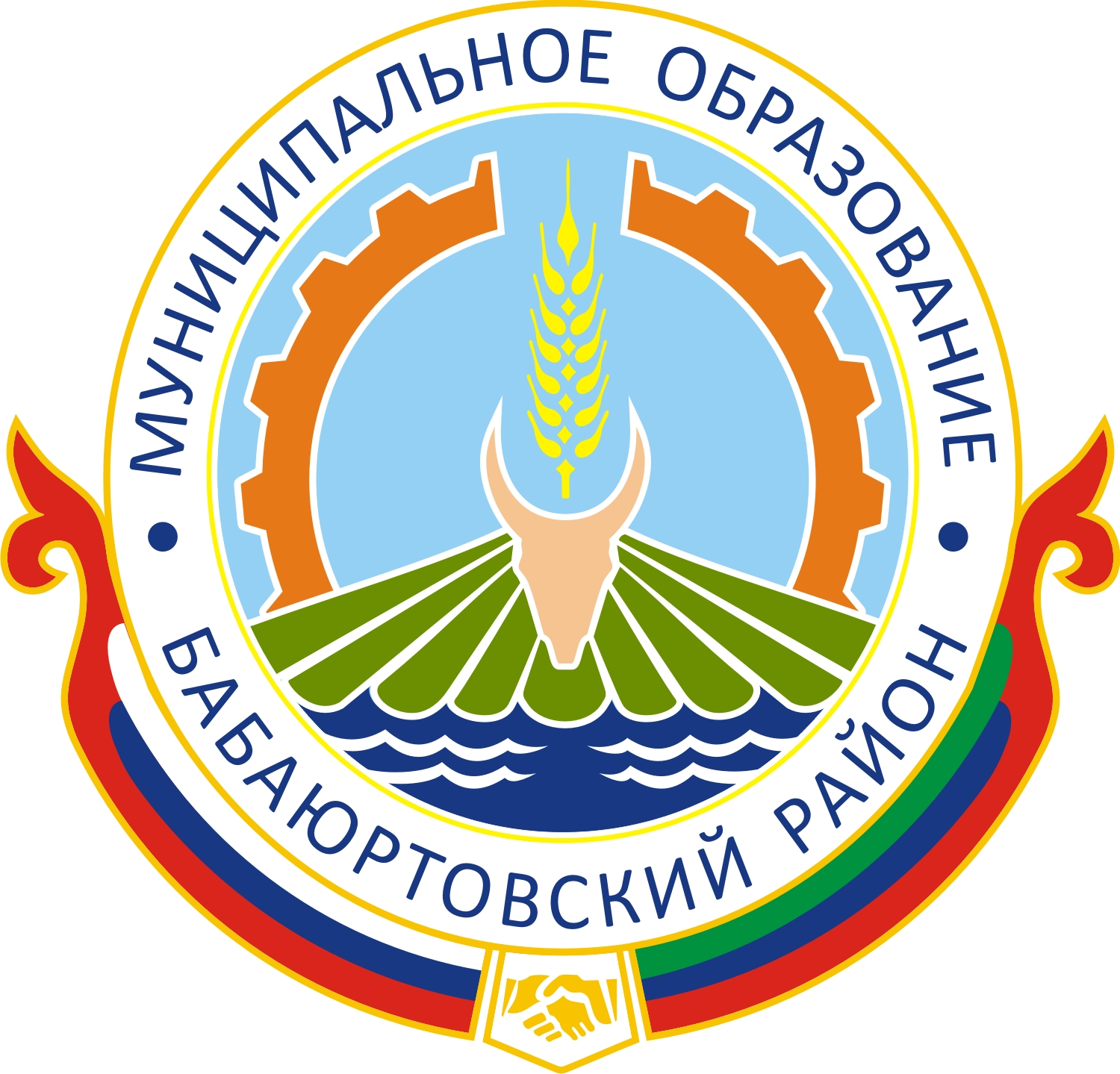
Emblem of Babayurtovsky District

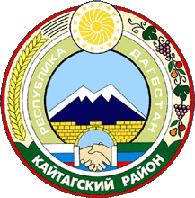
Emblem of Kaytagsky District

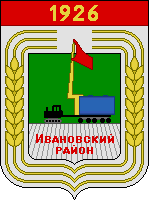
Emblem of Ivanovsky (Amur)

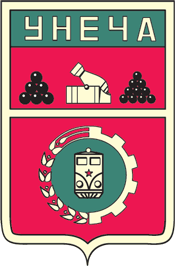
Emblem of Unecha

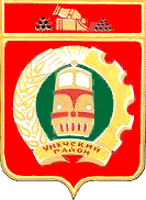
Emblem of Unechsky District

Emblem of Dzerzhinsk

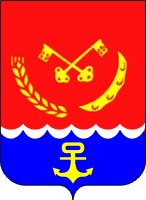
Emblem of Mikhaylovsky District

Emblem of Volgograd (city)

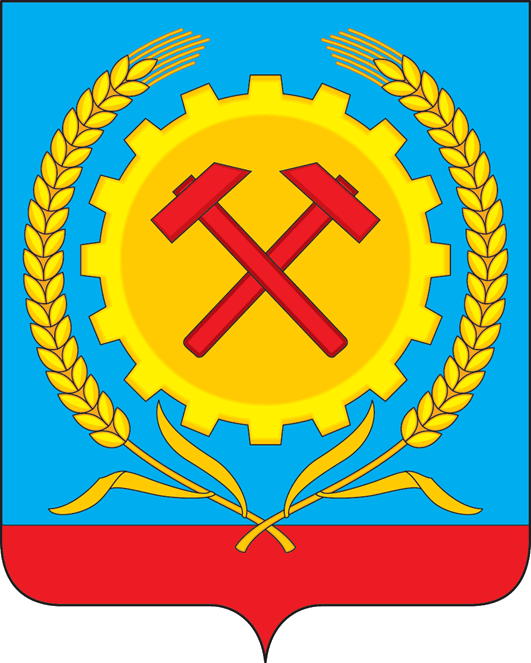
Emblem of Povorino

=== Historical emblems ===
Emblem (1928–1929) of the Kingdom of Afghanistan

Emblem (1978–1980) of the Democratic Republic of Afghanistan (1978–1987)

Emblem (1980–1987) of the Democratic Republic of Afghanistan (1978–1987)

Emblem of the People's Socialist Republic of Albania (1946–1991)

Emblem of the Azerbaijan People's Government (1946)

Emblem of the People's Republic of Benin (1975–1990)

Emblem of Burkina Faso (1984–1987)

Emblem of the People's Republic of Bulgaria (1971–1990)

National emblem of Cape Verde (1975–1992)

Emblem of the Chinese Soviet Republic (1931–1937)

Emblem of the People's Republic of the Congo (1970–1992)

Emblem of the Ethiopian Derg (1975–1987)

Emblem of the People's Democratic Republic of Ethiopia (1987–1991)

Coat of arms of the Far Eastern Republic (1920–1922)

Emblem of the German Democratic Republic (1949–1953)

Emblem of the German Democratic Republic (1953–1955)

Emblem of the German Democratic Republic (1955–1990)

Emblem of the Iraqi Republic (1959–1965)

Emblem of the Hungarian People's Republic (1949–1956)

Emblem of the Hungarian People's Republic (1957–1989) and the Hungarian Republic (1989–1990). (Note: Atypically, the emblem includes a nod to traditional heraldry – a central shield.)

Emblem of Democratic Kampuchea (1975–1979)

Emblem of the People's Republic of Kampuchea (1979–1989)

Emblem of Laos (1975–1991)

Emblem of the Democratic Republic of Madagascar (1975–1992)

Emblem of the Republic of Mahabad (1946)

Emblem of the Mongolian People's Republic (1960–1992)

Emblem of the Russian Federation (1992–1993)

Emblem of the Socialist Republic of Romania (1965–1989)

Emblem of the Union of Soviet Socialist Republics (1956–1991)

Emblem of the Tuvan People's Republic (1943–1944)

Emblem of the Socialist Federal Republic of Yugoslavia (1963–1993)

Emblem of the Gagauz Republic (1989–1995)

==== Republics of the Soviet Union ====
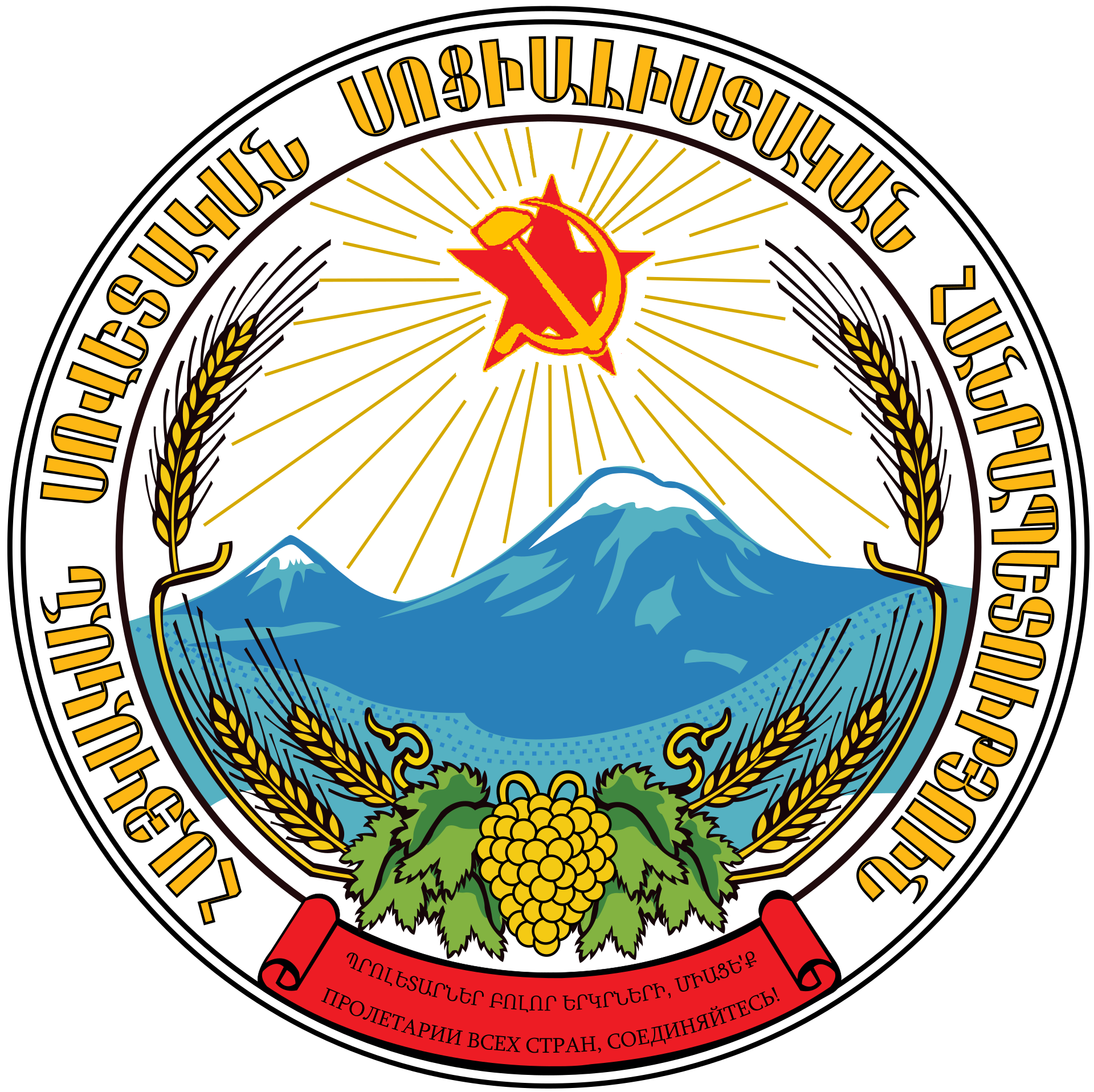
Emblem of the Armenian SSR (1936–1992)

Emblem of the Azerbaijan SSR (1937–1993)

Emblem of the Byelorussian SSR (1981–1991)

Emblem of the Estonian SSR (1940–1990)

Emblem of the Georgian SSR (1921–1990)

Emblem of the Karelo-Finnish SSR (1941–1956)

Emblem of the Kazakh SSR (1937–1992)

Emblem of the Kirghiz SSR (1948–1994)

Emblem of the Latvian SSR (1940–1990)

Emblem of the Lithuanian SSR (1940–1990)

Emblem of the Moldavian SSR (1941–1990)

Emblem of the Russian SFSR (1978–1992)

Emblem of the Tajik SSR (1937–1992)

Emblem of the Transcaucasian SFSR (1930–1936)

Emblem of the Turkestan ASSR (1919–1924)

Emblem of the Turkmen SSR (1937–1992)

Emblem of the Ukrainian SSR (1949–1991)

Emblem of the Uzbek SSR (1937–1992)

==== Republics of Yugoslavia ====
Emblem of Bosnia and Herzegovina (1946–1992)

Emblem of Croatia (1947–1990)

Emblem of the Socialist Republic of Macedonia (1946–1991) and the Republic of Macedonia (1991–2009)

Emblem of Montenegro (1945–1993)

Emblem of the Socialist Republic of Serbia (1947–1992) and the Republic of Serbia (1992–2004)

Emblem of Slovenia (1945–1991)

=== Miscellaneous ===
==== State symbols ====
Emblem of the Chinese People's Political Consultative Conference

Emblem of the Lao Ministry of Agriculture and Forestry

Emblem of the General Secretary of the Workers' Party of Korea

Emblem of the President of the State Affairs of North Korea

Government Seal of Bangladesh

Insignia of the People's Liberation Army

Emblem of the Vietnam People’s Army

Emblem of the Korean People's Army

Emblem of the Lao People's Armed Forces

Emblem of the Vietnam People's Public Security and Ministry of Public Security

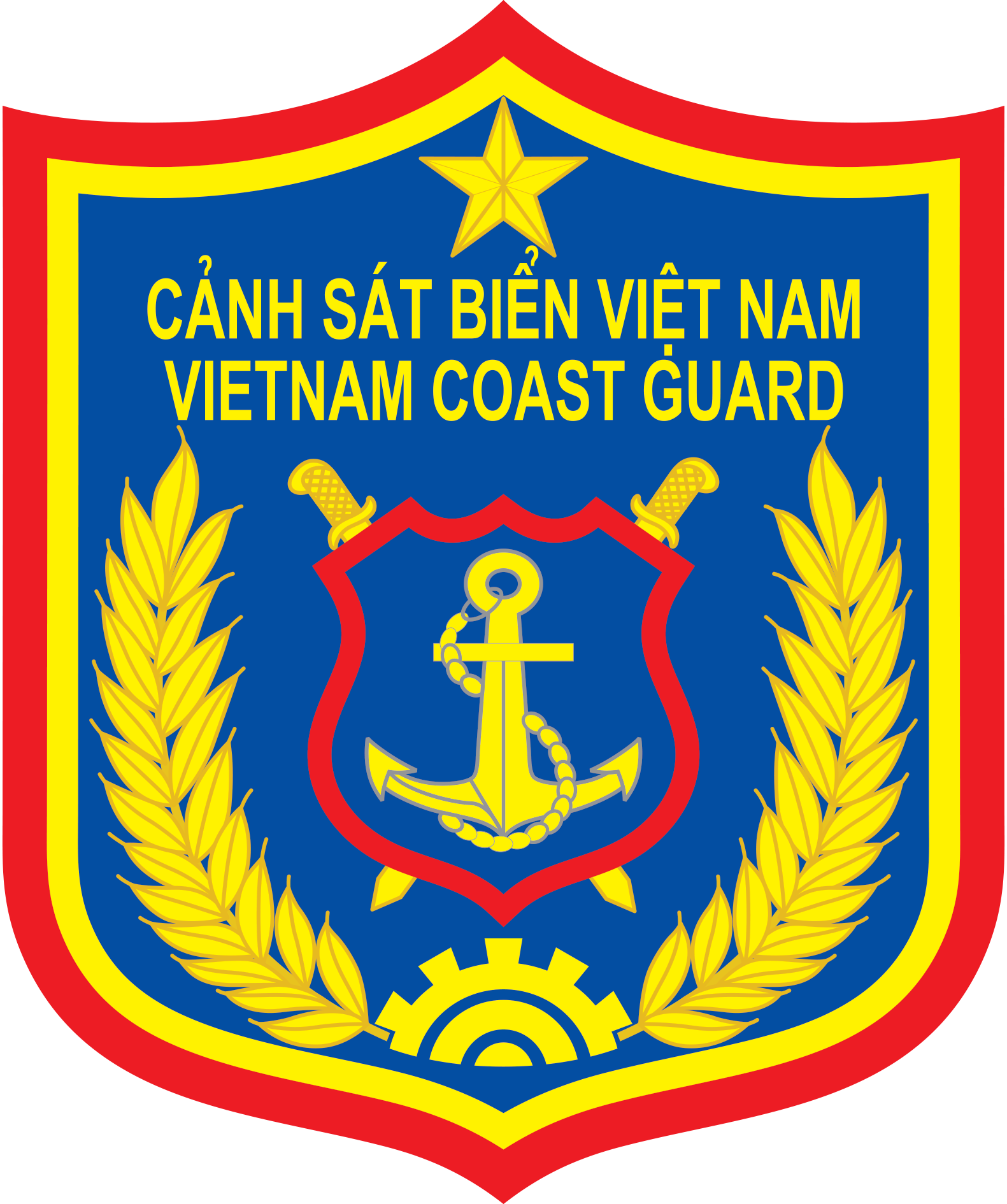
Patch of the Vietnam Coast Guard, using the same template to other Vietnam People’s Army branches.

==== Parties and organisations ====
Emblem of the Communist Youth League of China

Emblem of the Lao People's Revolutionary Youth Union

Emblem of the Socialist Patriotic Youth League

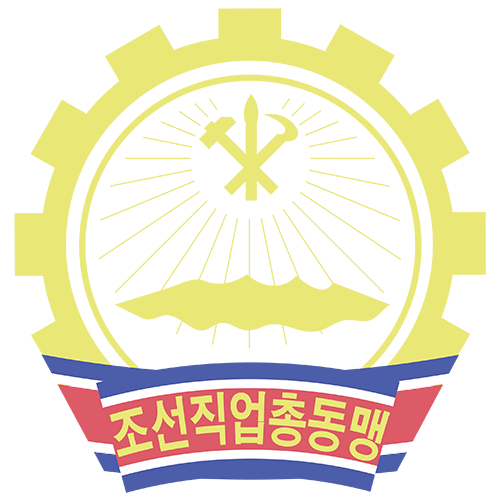
Emblem of the General Federation of Trade Unions of Korea

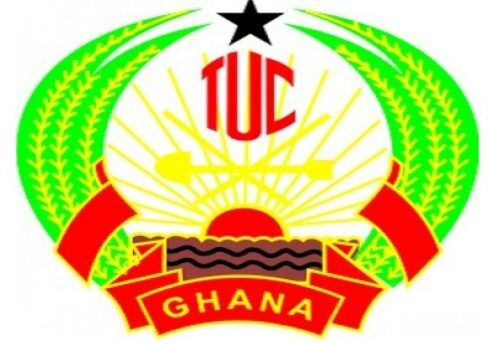
Emblem of the Ghana Trades Union Congress

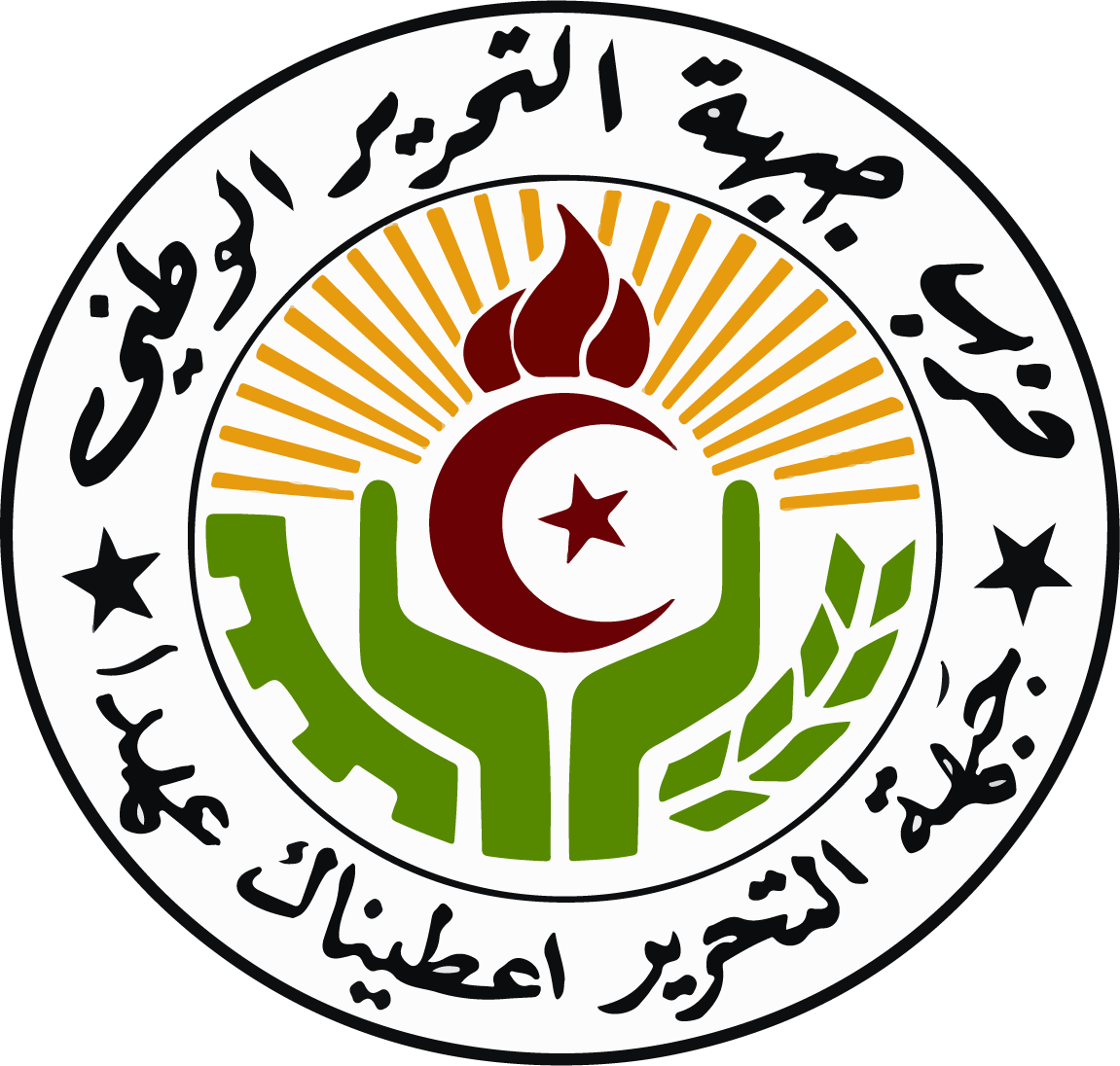
Emblem of the National Liberation Front

Emblem of the People's Democratic Party of Afghanistan

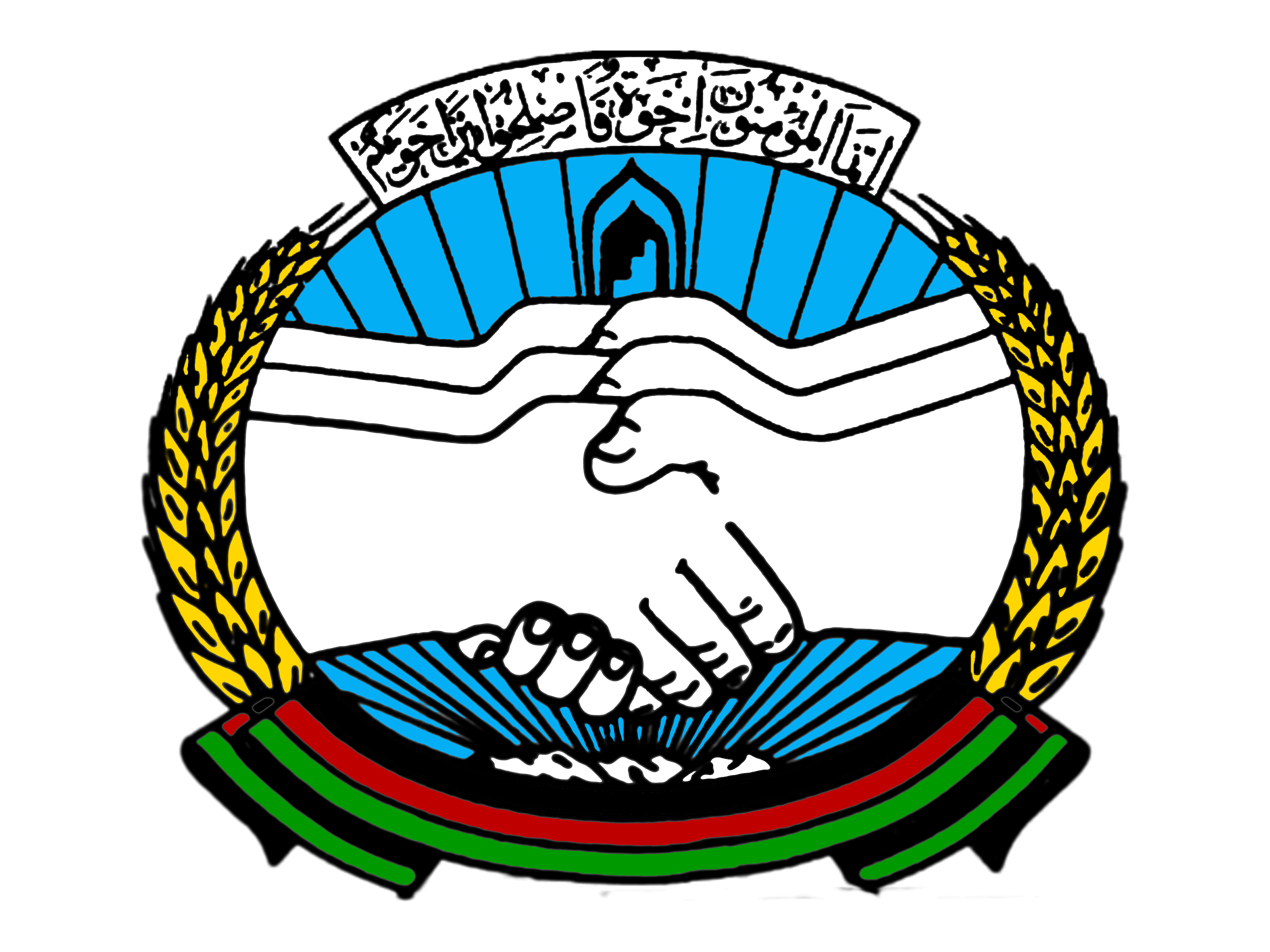
Emblem of the Watan Party of Afghanistan

Emblem of the Labour Youth Union of Albania

Emblem of the Fatherland Front

Emblem of the Communist Party of Czechoslovakia

Emblem of the Czech National Social Party

Emblem of the Ethiopian People's Revolutionary Party

Emblem of the Ethiopian People's Revolutionary Party (ca 1975)

Emblem of the Tigray People's Liberation Front

Emblem of the Romanian Communist Party

Emblem of the Ploughmen's Front

Emblem of the Somali Revolutionary Socialist Party

Emblem of the African Independence Party – Renewal

Emblem of the Communist Party of Chile

Logo of the Communist Party of Indonesia

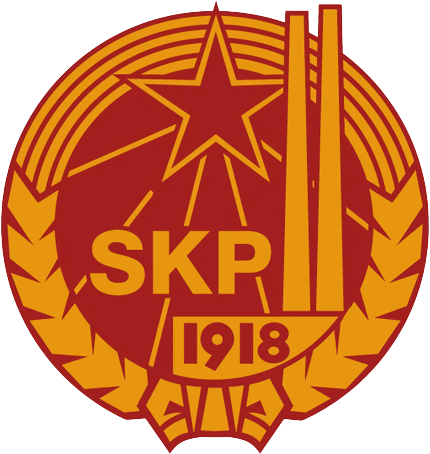
Logo of the Communist Party of Finland

Logo of the Portuguese Socialist Party

Logo of the Italian Socialist Party (1971–1978)

Former logo of the Communist Party of Australia

Emblem of the Vietnam Fatherland Front

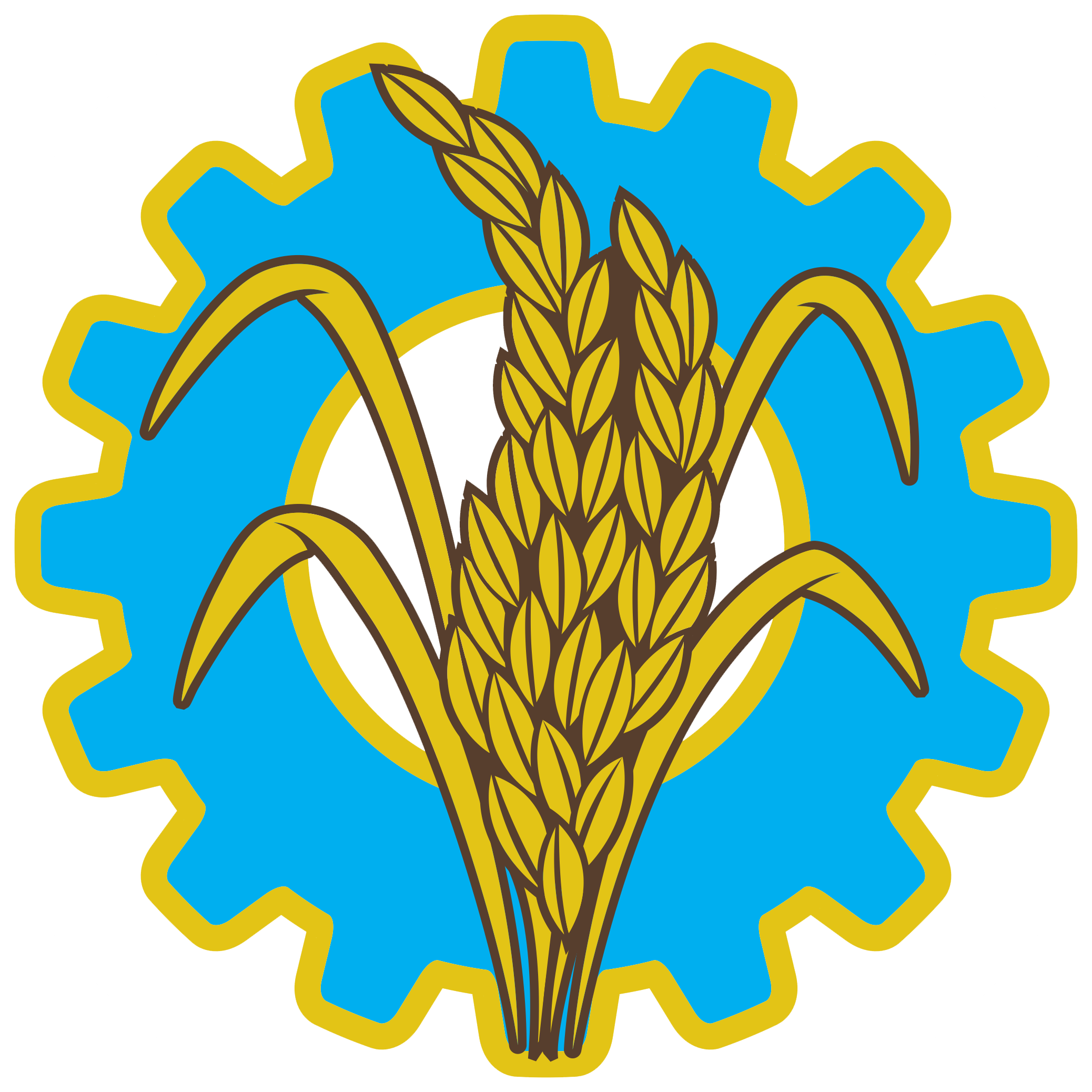
Symbol of the Burma Socialist Programme Party.

Alternative emblem of the Communist Party of Vietnam.

Emblem of the Yemeni Socialist Party (1978‐1990)

== Bibliography ==
- Arvidsson, Stefan (2017). Style and Mythology of Socialism: Socialist Idealism, 1871–1914. Routledge
- Arvidsson, Stefan (2025). Secularist, Religious and Scientistic Socialism: Red Faith I. Routledge
- Gorman, John (1985). Images of Labour: Selected Memorabilia from the National Museum of Labour History. London: Scorpion Publications.
- Gorman, John (1986). Banner bright: An Illustrated History of Trade Union Banners. Buckhurst Hill, Essex: Scorpion Publications.
