= Yerkovtsy =

Yerkovtsy Ерковцы
- Selo
- Location within Amur Oblast Location within Russia
- Coordinates: 50°28′N 128°25′E
- Country: Russia
- Region: Amur Oblast
- District: Ivanovsky District
- Time zone: UTC+9:00

Yerkovtsy (Russian: Ерковцы) is a rural locality (a selo) in Yerkovetsky Selsoviet of Ivanovsky District, Amur Oblast, Russia. The population was 932 as of 2018. There are 7 streets.

== Geography ==
Yerkovtsy is located near the right bank of the Kozlovka River, 37 km northeast of Ivanovka (the district's administrative centre) by road. Konstantinogradovka is the nearest rural locality.
