= Nekrasovka, Ivanovsky District, Amur Oblast =

Nekrasovka Некрасовка
- Selo
- Location within Amur Oblast Location within Russia
- Coordinates: 50°20′N 128°05′E
- Country: Russia
- Region: Amur Oblast
- District: Ivanovsky District
- Time zone: UTC+9:00

Nekrasovka (Russian: Некрасовка) is a rural locality (a selo) in Pravovostochny Selsoviet of Ivanovsky District, Amur Oblast, Russia. The population was 79 as of 2018. There are 2 streets.

== Geography ==
Nekrasovka is located on the right bank of the Manchzhurka River, 9 km east of Ivanovka (the district's administrative centre) by road. Sadovoye is the nearest rural locality.
