= Vladimir Bakin =

Russian military general

General of the Army Vladimir Bakin
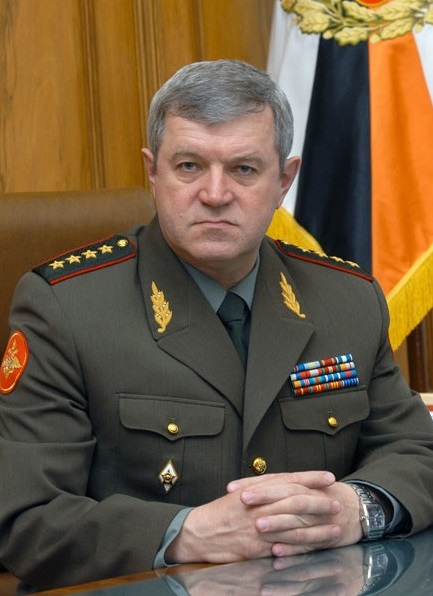
- Born: 25 November 1953 (age 72); Cheremkhovo, Amur Oblast, RSFSR
- Military career
- Allegiance: Soviet Union (to 1991); Russia
- Branch: Soviet Army; Russian Ground Forces
- Service years: 1971–2009
- Rank: General of the army
- Commands: Ground and Coastal Forces of the Baltic Fleet; Moscow Military District
- Awards: Order of Military Merit (Russia)

Vladimir Yuryevich Bakin (Russian: Владимир Юрьевич Бакин; born 25 November 1953) is a Russian military general who served among others as Commander of the Moscow Military District (2005–2009).

== Biography ==
Born on November 25, 1953, in the village of Cheremkhovo, Ivanovsky District, Amur Oblast, RSFSR, son of a military man. Since 1971 he served in the Armed Forces of the USSR. In 1975 he graduated from the Far Eastern Higher Combined Arms Command School. He served as a platoon, company, and battalion commander in the Carpathian Military District. In 1986 he graduated from the Frunze Military Academy. In 1986-1993 he served as regiment commander, chief of staff of a division in the Transbaikal Military District. In 1995, he graduated from the Military Academy of the General Staff of the Armed Forces of Russia and was appointed commander of the 18th Guards Motor Rifle Division of the 11th Army Corps. Since January 1998, Chief of Staff, and since December 1999, Commander of the Ground and Coastal Forces of the Baltic Fleet. By decree of the President of Russia on September 17, 2001, he was appointed chief of staff and first deputy commander of the Siberian Military District. On December 13, 2001, he was awarded the military rank of lieutenant general. On February 22, 2004, he was awarded the military rank of Colonel General. On January 5, 2005, he was appointed chief of staff and first deputy commander of the Volga–Ural Military District. Since June 6, 2005, he served as Commander of the Moscow Military District. By decree of the President of the Russian Federation of February 23, 2007, he was awarded the military rank of army general. From February 5 to May 18, 2009 - Deputy Commander-in-Chief of the Ground Forces of the Russian Federation. By decree of the President of the Russian Federation of May 18, 2009, he was relieved of his position and discharged from military service into the reserve.
