= Bolsheozyorka =

Bolsheozyorka Большеозёрка
- Selo
- Location within Amur Oblast Location within Russia
- Coordinates: 50°23′N 128°08′E
- Country: Russia
- Region: Amur Oblast
- District: Ivanovsky District
- Time zone: UTC+9:00

Bolsheozyorka (Russian: Большеозёрка) is a rural locality (a selo) in Annovsky Selsoviet of Ivanovsky District, Amur Oblast, Russia. The population was 245 as of 2018. There are 6 streets.

== Geography ==
Bolsheozyorka is located near the left bank of the Ivanovka River, 13 km northeast of Ivanovka (the district's administrative centre) by road. Lugovoye is the nearest rural locality.
