= Annovka, Amur Oblast =

Annovka Анновка
- Selo
- Location within Amur Oblast Location within Russia
- Coordinates: 50°22′N 128°21′E
- Country: Russia
- Region: Amur Oblast
- District: Ivanovsky District
- Time zone: UTC+9:00

Annovka (Russian: Анновка) is a rural locality (a selo) and the administrative center of Annovsky Selsoviet of Ivanovsky District, Amur Oblast, Russia. The population was 597 as of 2018. There are 9 streets.

== Geography ==
Annovka is located near the left bank of the Ivanovka River, 28 km east of Ivanovka (the district's administrative centre) by road. Bolsheozyorka is the nearest rural locality.
