= Cheremkhovo, Amur Oblast =

Cheremkhovo Черемхово
- Selo
- Location within Amur Oblast Location within Russia
- Coordinates: 50°23′N 127°47′E
- Country: Russia
- Region: Amur Oblast
- District: Ivanovsky District
- Time zone: UTC+9:00

Cheremkhovo (Russian: Черемхово) is a rural locality (a selo) and the administrative center of Cheremkhovsky Selsoviet of Ivanovsky District, Amur Oblast, Russia. The population was 824 as of 2018. There are 8 streets.

== Geography ==
Cheremkhovo is located on the left bank of the Ivanovka River, 18 km (11 mi) northwest of Ivanovka (the district's administrative centre) by road. Bogorodskoye is the nearest rural locality.
