= Emblem of Angola =

Republic of Angola
- Armiger: Republic of Angola
- Adopted: 2 November 1990 (modified 2 January 2010)

The national emblem of Angola reflects the recent past of the nation. It includes Marxist imagery found on the device (as can be seen when compared with other examples of socialist heraldry), expanded from what is found on the national flag.

In the center is a machete and hoe, representing the revolution through which the nation gained independence and the importance of agricultural workers. Above both emblems is a star, a common symbol in socialist emblems. The star is taken to represent progress. The rising sun is the traditional symbol of a new beginning. These emblems are all enclosed within a circle whose right half is formed by cog-wheel, representing the industrial workers, and whose left half is a half-wreath of maize, coffea and cotton leaves, representing agriculture. At the bottom is an open book that represents education.

The banner at the bottom reads República de Angola, Portuguese for "Republic of Angola". This was changed from República Popular de Angola ("People's Republic of Angola") in 1990.

Details of the insignia are laid down in Article 163 of the Constitution of Angola.

In 1935, the Portuguese colonies were officially assigned coats of arms that followed a standard design pattern. (Note: published in the Diário do Govêrno) For Angola, this consisted of a shield parted per pale, with the Portuguese arms without its usual bordure in the dexter (viewer's left) half and in the sinister (viewer's right) half the arms for Angola itself: a golden elephant and a golden zebra on a purpure field. The wavy bars in the base (enté en point) represented Angola's location overseas from metropolitan Portugal.

== Historical coats of arms ==
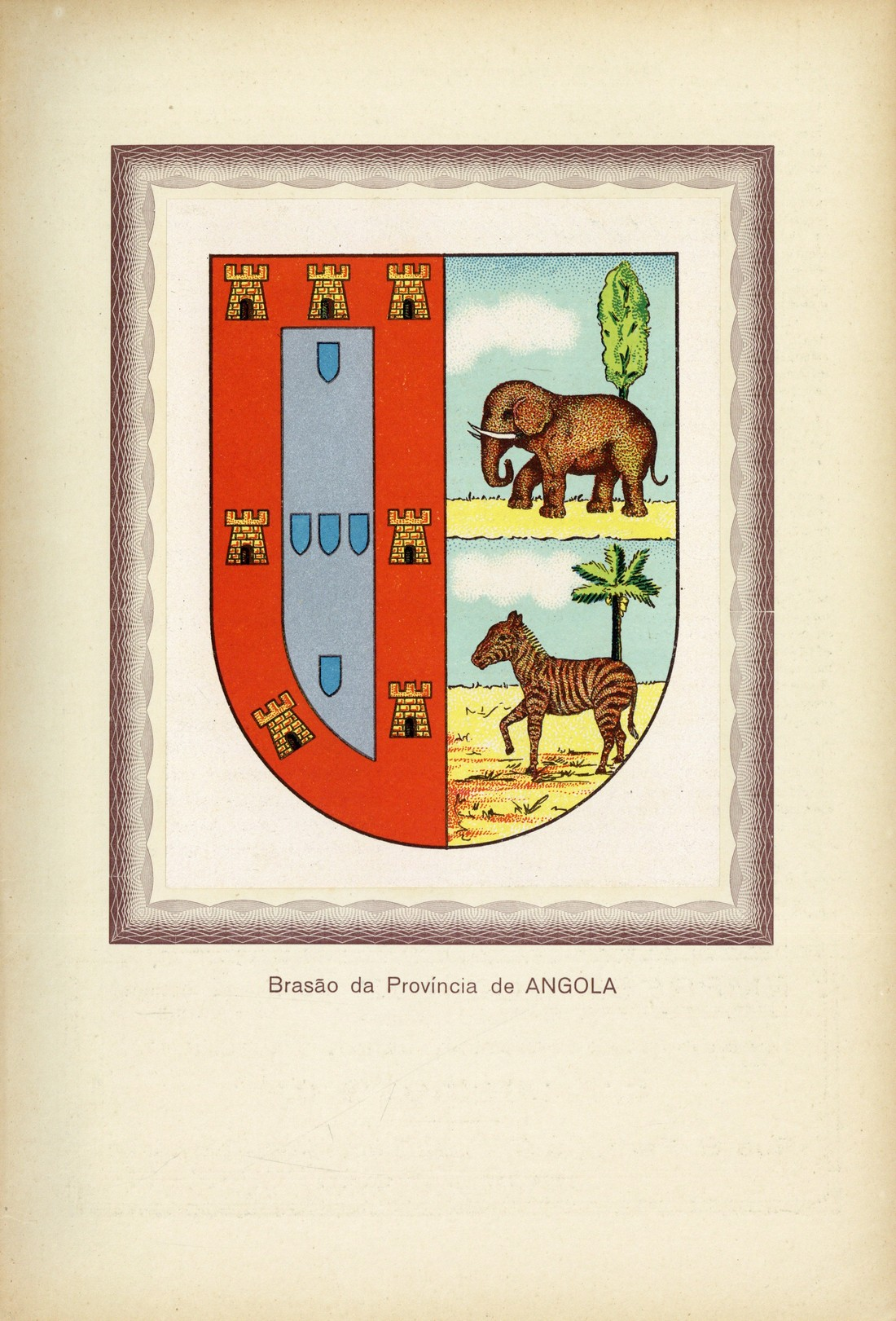
Proposed coat of arms of Angola in the Bulletin of 1933

A proposal for a coat of arms for the colony of Angola, at the request of the General Agency of the Colonies, for the Portuguese Institute of Heraldry and prepared by Afonso Dornelas in June 1932.

Temporary coat of arms representing Portuguese Angola at the Portuguese colonial exhibition (1934).

Coat of arms of the Portuguese Colony of Angola between 8 May 1935 and 11 June 1951

Coat of arms of the Portuguese Province of Angola, from 11 June 1951 to 11 November 1975

Lesser coat of arms between 8 May 1935 and 11 November 1975

Emblem of the People's Republic of Angola (1975–1992)

Emblem of the Democratic People's Republic of Angola, a rival government controlled by UNITA (1975–1976 and 1979–2002)

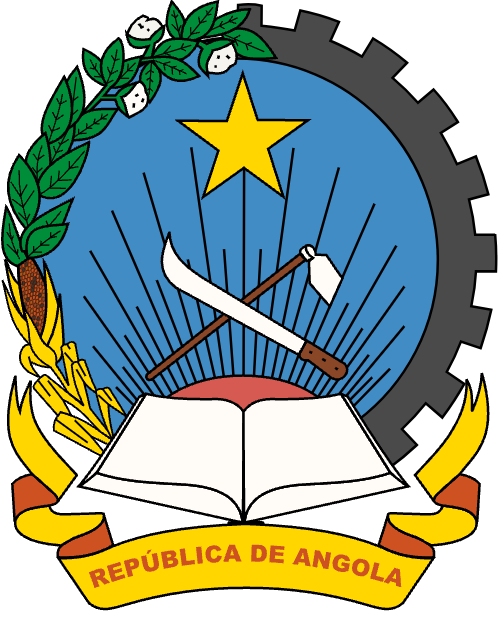
Emblem of the Republic of Angola (1992–2010)

== See also ==
- Flag of Angola
