= Coat of arms of the Luhansk People's Republic =

State symbol of Lugansk People Republic

- Adopted: 29 October 2014; 11 years ago
- Use: National symbol

The coat of arms of the Luhansk People's Republic (LPR) is one of the state symbols of the generally unrecognised federal subject of the Russian Federation with the flag and anthem. The LPR declared independence from Ukraine in 2014 and adopted its own national symbols the same year, but had only received limited international recognition, being only recognized by Russia, Ba'athist Syria, and North Korea.

== History ==
Prior to the approval of a coat of arms by the authorities of the separatist republic, two versions were used as temporary state symbols. A competition to design a new emblem was held on 15 May 2014. The official coat of arms was approved on 29 October 2014.

- From April–May 2014 – a double-headed eagle with the coat of arms of Luhansk and two crossed picks under it (sometimes without picks); also depicted on the first flag of the LPR.
- From June–October 2014 – Ukraine's coat of arms of the Luhansk region with some modifications (the colors of the Ukrainian flag were replaced with the ribbon of Saint George's, and the text under the shield reads Luhansk People's Republic.
Coat of arms of the LPR from April–May 2014

Coat of arms of the LPR from June–October 2014

== Symbolism ==
The coat of arms consists of a five-pointed red star framed by a white border and golden rays. To the left and right of the star are golden wheat ears, entwined with a banner in the colors of the state flag of the Luhansk People's Republic, one color of the flag for each coil of the banner – light blue, blue and red respectively. Behind the wheat ears is a crown of oak leaves on each side. Situated underneath the star are three banners in the colors of the national flag, on which the words Luhansk People's Republic in Cyrillic script are written from top to bottom. The inscription is in gold typeface. Above the five-pointed red star is an eight-pointed golden star, to which both groups of wheat ears are joined. The design bears similarities to the emblem of the Soviet Union and other emblems of the socialist heraldic style.
