= Emblem of the Turkestan Autonomous Soviet Socialist Republic =

- Armiger: Turkestan Autonomous Soviet Socialist Republic
- Adopted: 1919
- Motto: Т.С.С.Р.

The national emblem of the Turkestan Autonomous Soviet Socialist Republic was adopted by the government of the Turkestan Autonomous Soviet Socialist Republic.

== History ==
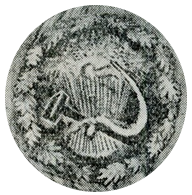
Coat of arms on the banner of the First Turkestan Command Course (photographed on 3 November 1918)

=== As the Autonomous Turkestan SSR ===
The emblem of the Autonomous Turkestan SSR was similar to the emblem of the Russian Soviet Federative Socialist Republic. The emblem consisted of the abbreviation "Т.С.С.Р."
