= Emblem of Laos =

National Emblem of the Lao People's Democratic Republic
- Armiger: Lao People's Democratic Republic
- Adopted: 1975 (modified in 2025)
- Motto: ສັນຕິພາບ ເອກະລາດ ປະຊາທິປະໄຕ "Peace, Independence, Democracy" ເອກະພາບ ວັດຖະນາຖາວອນ "Unity and Prosperity" ສາທາລະນະລັດ ປະຊາທິປະໄຕ ປະຊາຊົນລາວ "Lao People's Democratic Republic"
- Other elements: A crescent-shaped stalks of fully ripened rice at sides in between the tips of the Pagoda and the red ribbon wrapped around it on sides with the National Motto and the Name of the State.

The National Emblem of the Lao People's Democratic Republic shows the national shrine Pha That Luang. A dam is pictured, which is a symbol of power generation at the reservoir Nam Ngum. An asphalt street and a stylized watered field is pictured. In the lower part is a section of a gear wheel. The inscription on the left reads "Peace, Independence, Democracy" (Lao script: ສັນຕິພາບ ເອກະລາດ ປະຊາທິປະໄຕ) and on the right, "Unity and Prosperity" (Lao script: ເອກະພາບ ວັດຖະນາຖາວອນ).

== History ==
An example of socialist heraldry, the coat of arms was originally adopted in 1975. It was modified in August 1991 to deemphasize Communism as a reaction to the fall of the Soviet Union, at which time the red star and hammer and sickle were replaced with the national shrine at Pha That Luang. A description of the coat of arms is specified in the Laotian constitution:

The National Emblem of the Lao People's Democratic Republic is a circle depicting in the bottom part one-half of a cog wheel and red ribbon with inscriptions [of the words] "Lao People's Democratic Republic", and [flanked by] crescent-shaped stalks of fully ripened rice at both sides and red ribbons bearing the inscription "Peace, Independence, Democracy, Unity, Prosperity". A picture of Pha That Luang Pagoda is located between the tips of the stalks of rice. A road, a paddy field, a forest and a hydroelectric dam are depicted in the middle of the circle.

— Constitution of the Lao People's Democratic Republic, § 90

== Gallery ==
Emblem during the monarchy, 1949–1975

1975–1991

1991–2025

Arms of the Laos Ministry of Agriculture and Forestry
