= Flag of East Germany =

German Democratic Republic
- Flagge der Deutschen Demokratischen Republik
- Use: National flag and ensign
- Proportion: 3∶5
- Adopted: 1 October 1959; 67 years ago
- Relinquished: 3 October 1990; 36 years ago (unification)
- Design: A horizontal tricolour of black, red, and gold, adorned with the National emblem of East Germany.

The first flag of East Germany was a tricolour of black, red and gold, identical to the flags of the Weimar Republic, West Germany, and present-day Germany. From 1959 until the reunification of Germany in 1990, it was charged with the national emblem, consisting of a hammer and compass inside a wreath of wheat, centered on a red background. The second flag's design and symbolism were derived from the flag of the Weimar Republic and communist symbolism. The flag was outlawed as an unconstitutional and criminal symbol in West Germany and West Berlin, where it was referred to as the Spalterflagge ('secessionist flag') until the late 1960s.

== Symbolism and design ==
With relations deteriorating between the Soviet Union and the United States, the three Western Allies met in March 1948 to merge their zones of occupation and allow the formation of what became the Federal Republic of Germany, commonly known as West Germany. Meanwhile, the eastern Soviet zone became the German Democratic Republic, commonly known as East Germany.

While the use of black-red-gold had been suggested in the Soviet zone in 1946, the Second People's Congress in 1948 decided to adopt the old black-white-red tricolour as a national flag for East Germany. This choice was based on the use of these colours by the National Committee for a Free Germany, a German anti-Nazi organisation that operated in the Soviet Union in the last two years of the war. In 1949, following a suggestion from Friedrich Ebert Jr., the black-red-gold tricolour was instead selected as the flag of the German Democratic Republic upon the formation of this state on 7 October 1949. From 1949 to 1959, the flags of both West and East Germany were identical. On 1 October 1959, the East German government changed its flag with the addition of coat of arms. In West Germany, these changes were seen as a deliberate attempt to divide the two Germanies. Displaying this flag in West Germany and West Berlin—where it became known as the Spalterflagge (divider-flag)—was seen as a breach of the constitution and subsequently banned until the late 1960s.

Colour scheme	Black	Red	Gold
RAL	9005; Jet black	3020; Traffic red	1021; Rapeseed yellow
HKS	0, 0, 0	5.0PB 3.0/12	6.0R 4.5/14
Pantone	Black	485	7405*

Colour scheme: valid for East German flags 1949–1990

The colours video approximation is listed below:

Germany	Black (flag/arms)	Red (flag/arms)	Gold (flag)	Gold (arms)
RGB	0/0/0	221/0/0	255/206/0	255/199/9
Hexadecimal	#000000ff	#dd0000ff	#ffce00ff	#ffc709ff
CMYK	0/0/0/100	0/100/100/13	0/19/100/0	0/22/96/0
HSL	0/0/0	0/255/100	34/255/128	33/255/132

From 1956 to 1964, West and East Germany attended the Winter and Summer Olympic Games as a single team, known as the United Team of Germany. After the East German national flag was changed in 1959, neither country accepted the flag of the other. As a compromise, a new flag was used by the United Team of Germany from 1960 to 1964, featuring the black-red-gold tricolour defaced with white Olympic rings in the red stripe. In 1968 for both the Winter games in France and the Summer games in Mexico, the teams from the two German states entered separately, but both used the same German Olympic flag. From 1972 to 1988, the separate West and East German teams used their respective national flags.

Flag of the German Democratic Republic from 1949 to 1959

== History ==
Civil ensign of the GDR from 1959 to 1973

Flag of United Team of Germany

Following the reunification of Germany and the fall of the Berlin Wall, many Germans cut out the emblem of East Germany.

On the centenary of the Berlin March days in March 1948, the second People's Congress was convened in Berlin, seen as a German People's Council on the reorganization of the entire state in addition to the drafting of a constitution creating a national flag for the state of the German Democratic Republic. The choice was between three flags, one red, another black-white-red, and the last option black-red-gold. The proposal to introduce the red flag was quickly discarded. As a sign of communism and the international labor movement this flag was rejected even during the November Revolution of 1918 (and beyond) by the bourgeoisie. As in Germany, the decision was made in favor of the black, red and gold flag of the Weimar Republic. The Soviet Union was initially against this flag, due to it being a symbol of the Weimar Republic, a reminder of an era of weakness, crises, and unemployment. Thus, the black-white-red flag remained, whose usage goes back to the National Committee for a Free Germany. The committee was established on 12 and 13 June 1943 under Soviet leadership and took the old imperial flag to be seen as signs of the struggle against the fascist Nazi regime, Adolf Hitler, and the swastika flag.

Black white red, one of the proposed flags

The Third People's Congress 1949, set up by the Soviet occupation in 1948, brought Mayor of East Berlin Friedrich Ebert yet again, and the proposal for the black-red-gold flag. His application was approved on 30 May 1949 and put into effect on 7 October 1949 Law on state emblem and flag from 26 September 1949.

Thus, the West (FRG) and East Germany (GDR) had the same national flag. The East, however, led only in the first ten years of its existence. During this time the FRG competed in color with the identical design of the GDR. On 1 October 1959 the GDR added their national emblem, "hammer and compass surrounded by a garland of corn" in the flag as so as to create a distinction to the flag of the Federal Republic. The emblem was a symbol of the alliance of between workers, farmers, and intelligentsia.

The public presentation of this officially as a "Soviet zone flag" designated by the FRG flag was, however, viewed by the end of the 1960s as a breach of the Constitution and disruption of public order in the FRG and West Berlin and basically prevented by police action. Even when hoisting the flag of the GDR abroad there were stereotyped to West German protests. It was only on 22 July 1969 ordered the federal government (Grand Coalition), that the police everywhere should take no more action against the use of the flag and coat of arms of the GDR.

Since the situation regarding the recognition of the GDR under international law was complicated as a result of the Hallstein Doctrine, it started to be in 1968 in sporting contests, such as in Olympic Games, teams with athletes from both parts of Germany. The Olympic Committee of the GDR refused to compete under the flag of the Federal Republic, and the Olympic Committee of Germany took until the very last moment before deciding to carry the black-red-gold flag unchanged. Ultimately an agreement was made to place the Olympic rings in white over the red stripe of the black, red and gold flag. As part of the international recognition of the GDR by the United Nations and the recognition of the sovereignty of the GDR by the FRG, two separate teams with two separate flags took part since the 1972 Winter Olympics.

With the introduction of the new national flag in 1959 a new merchant flag was introduced. Before the GDR led the black-red-gold flag without coat of arms as merchant flag. The new merchant flag to a smaller state emblem is in the upper corner. 1973 this merchant flag was again abolished and replaced by the national flag, the order was National and merchant flag.

In addition to the East German flag, the red flag of the workers' movement was often hoisted at public buildings, at official events and on national holidays. Only on the Brandenburg Gate did two red flags fly to the left and right of the GDR state flag in the middle until the days after the Berlin Wall fell.

After the political turning point in 1989 in the GDR drew up the working group "New Constitution of the GDR", the Round Table a new constitution and proposed a new national flag. They should continue to be striped black-red-golden, but show instead of the State Emblem the presentation of the motto Swords into ploughshares. The other political events with the reunification ending existence of the GDR did not let the Constitution and therefore the new flag to take effect.

== War and service flags ==
The flags of the military units of the GDR bore the national coat of arms with a wreath of two olive branches on a red background, on a black, red and gold flag.

The flags of the People's Navy for combat ships and boats carried the coat of arms with an olive branch wreath on a red flag cloth, for auxiliary ships and boats on a blue flag cloth with a narrow black, red and gold band arranged in the middle. The state flag was used in a reduced form as a Gösch.

The ships and boats of the border brigade coast on the Baltic Sea, and the boats of the border troops of the GDR on the Elbe and Oder carried a green bar on the leech, as did the service flag of the border troops.

Flag of the National People's Army

Flag for combat ships and boats of the Volksmarine

Flag for auxiliary ships and boats of the Volksmarine

Deutsche Post service flag (1955–1973)

Flag for ships and boats of the Coastal Border Brigade

Flag of the Grenztruppen

=== Other flags and emblems ===
Flag of the Ministry of State Security (Stasi), East Germany, until 1990

Emblem of the Ministry of State Security (MfS) (Stasi) of the GDR (until 1990)

Coat of arms of National People's Army of the German Democratic Republic (1956–1990)

Emblem of the Ground Forces of National People's Army (1956–1990)

The coat of arms of the People's Navy with the Order of Karl Marx (1956–1990)

Emblem of Air Force of the National People's Army of the German Democratic Republic before 1959 (until 1956 the People's Police Air of the GDR)

Emblem of aircraft of National People's Army of the German Democratic Republic (1959–1990)

Emblem of the Grenztruppen used for vehicles (1949–1990)

National ensign of the GDR Volkspolizei-Bereitschaften (1962–1990)

Combat Groups of the Working Class coat of arms of the fighting groups of the working class, without oak leaves (1953–1990)

Emblem of the Warsaw Treaty Organization or "Warsaw Pact" (14 May 1955)

== Presidential standards ==
The first standard of the president had the shape of a rectangular flag in the colors black-red-gold with the inscription "President" in yellow in the red stripe, as well as "D.D.R." (contrary to the official abbreviation with dots) in the stripe below in black letters. The flag was surrounded by a stripe of yellow color. An original of the standard is in the German Historical Museum in Berlin.

Standard of the president of East Germany (1951–1953)

Standard of the president of East Germany (1953–1955)

Standard of the president of East Germany (1955–1960)

Standard of the president of the State Council (1960–1990)

== Historical flags ==
Flag	Date	Use	Description
	1949–1959	State flag (Staatsflagge)	
	1959–1990	State flag (Staatsflagge) 1959–1990; Merchant flag (Handelsflagge) 1973–1990	Tricolour of black, red, and yellow (same as West German colours), but bears the coat of arms of East Germany, consisting of a compass and a hammer encircled with rye
	1959–1973	Merchant flag (Handelsflagge)	Used by East German merchant ships prior to its replacement with the East German national flag in 1973
	1963–1990	Hanging state flag (Bannerflagge)	Both variants with vertical and horizontal bars were used.
	1975–1990	Flag of East German Post	
	1960–1990	Regimental colours (Truppenfahne) of Nationale Volksarmee	Ceremonial and parade version of the standard military flag

== Gallery ==
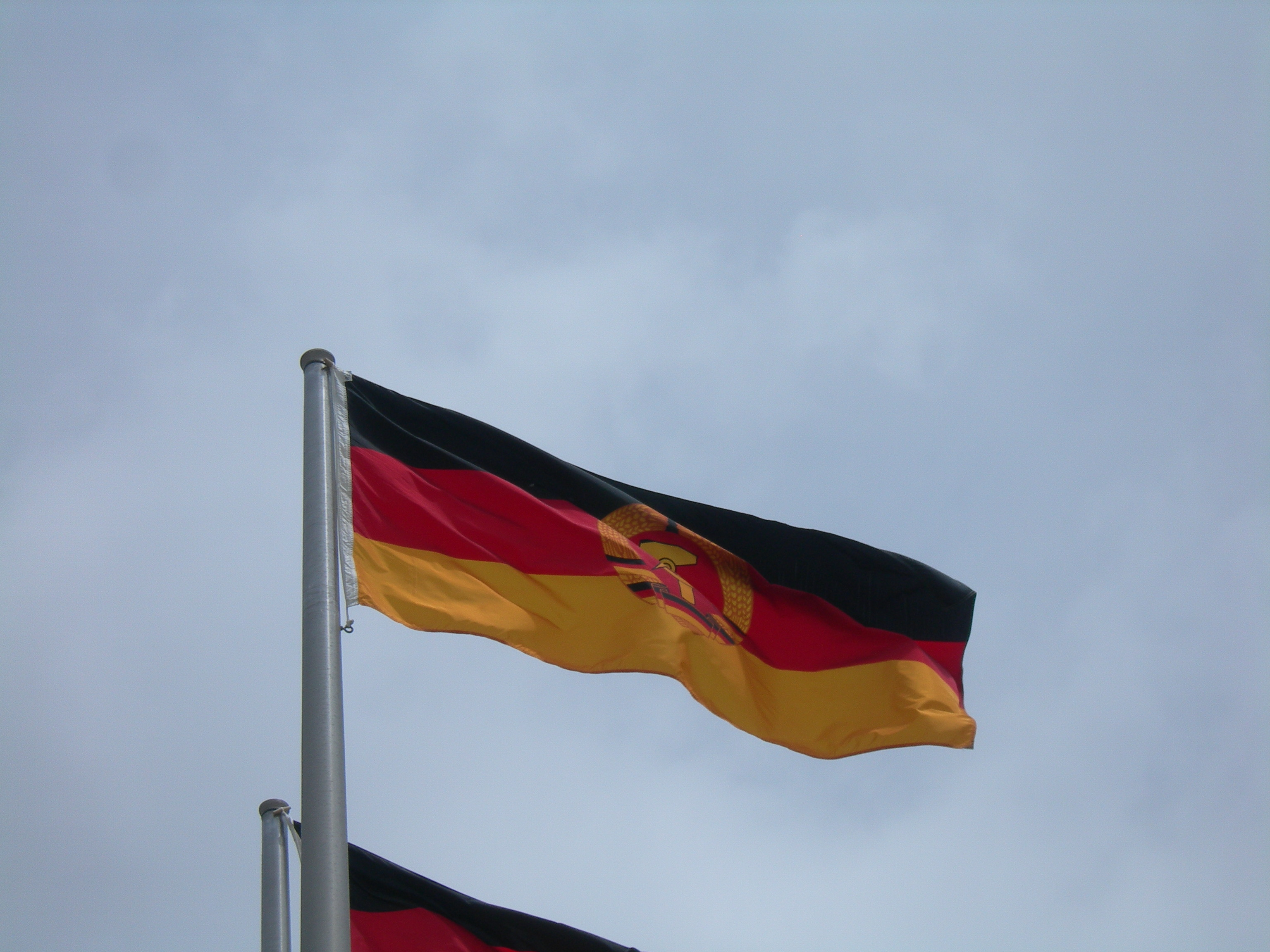
National flag of the German Democratic Republic flying

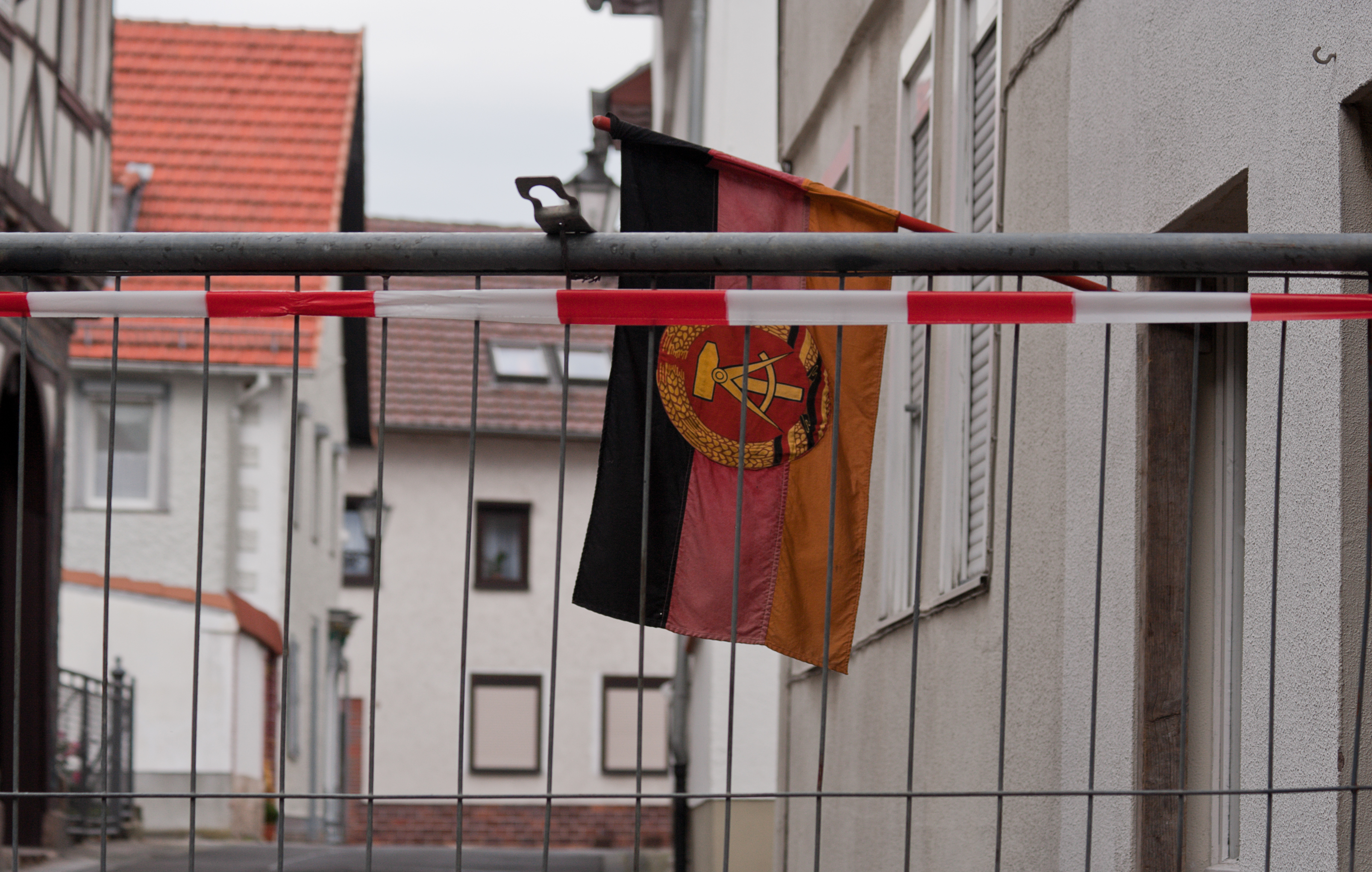
A GDR flag hanging on a building

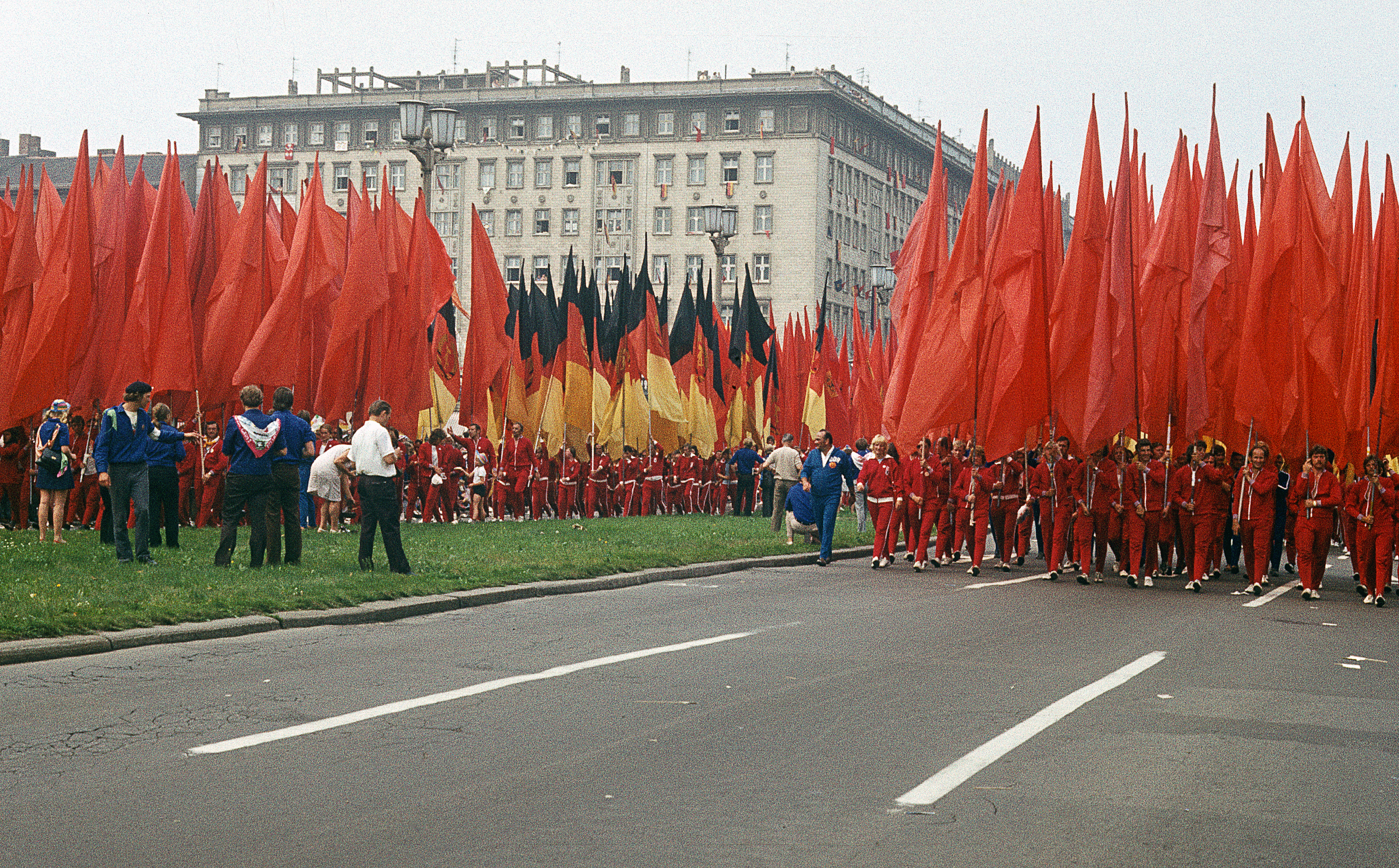
Series of Red and GDR flags during the 1973 World Festival of Youth and Students

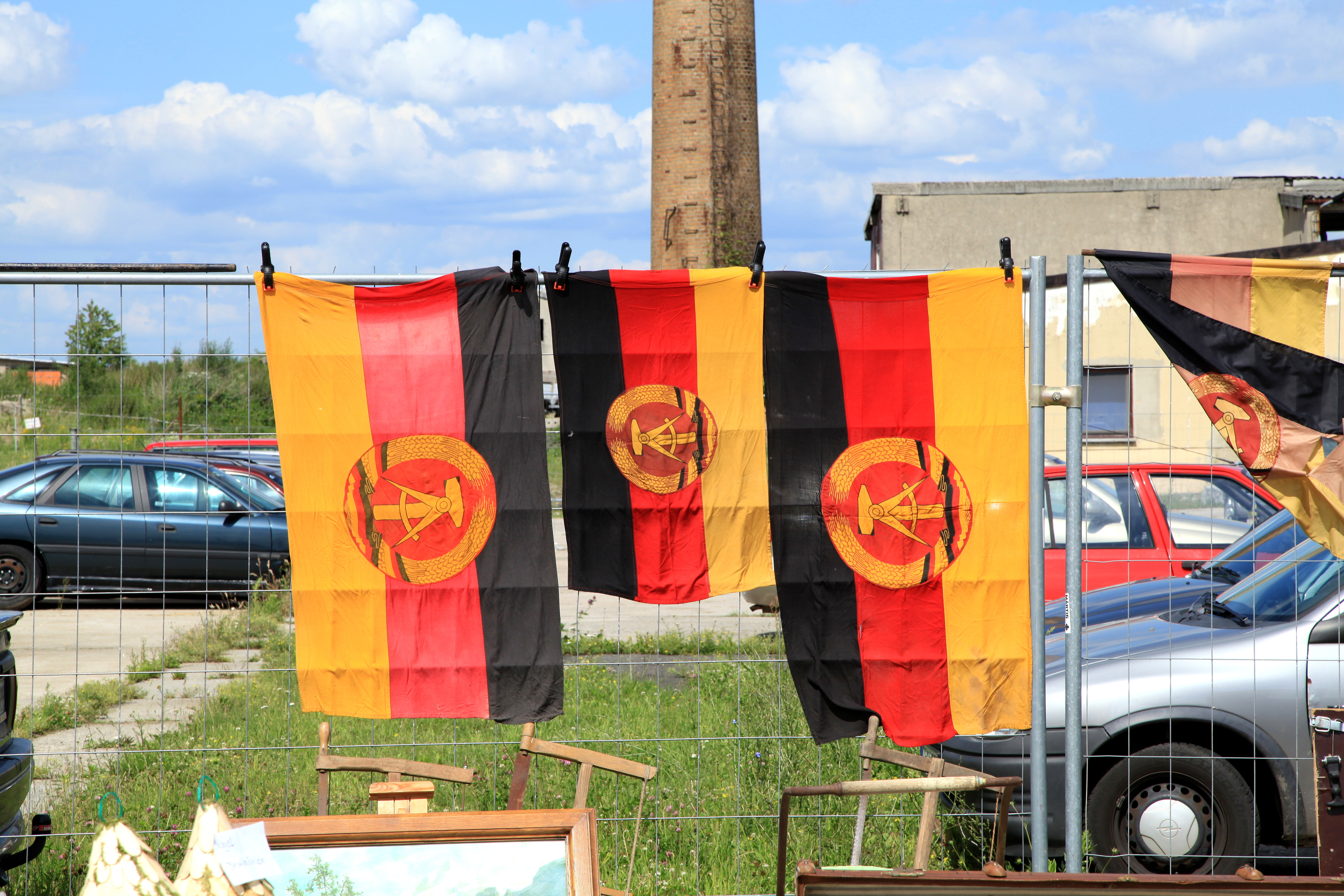
Three sets of GDR flags

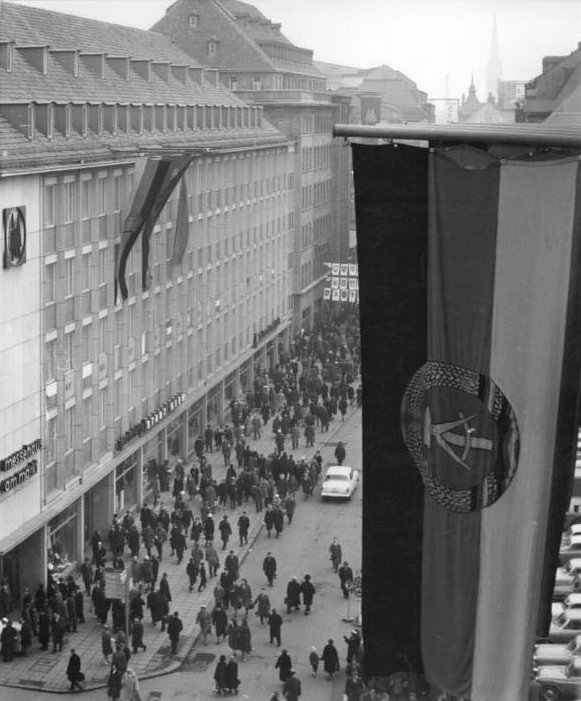
GDR flag hanging in Leipzig, 1965

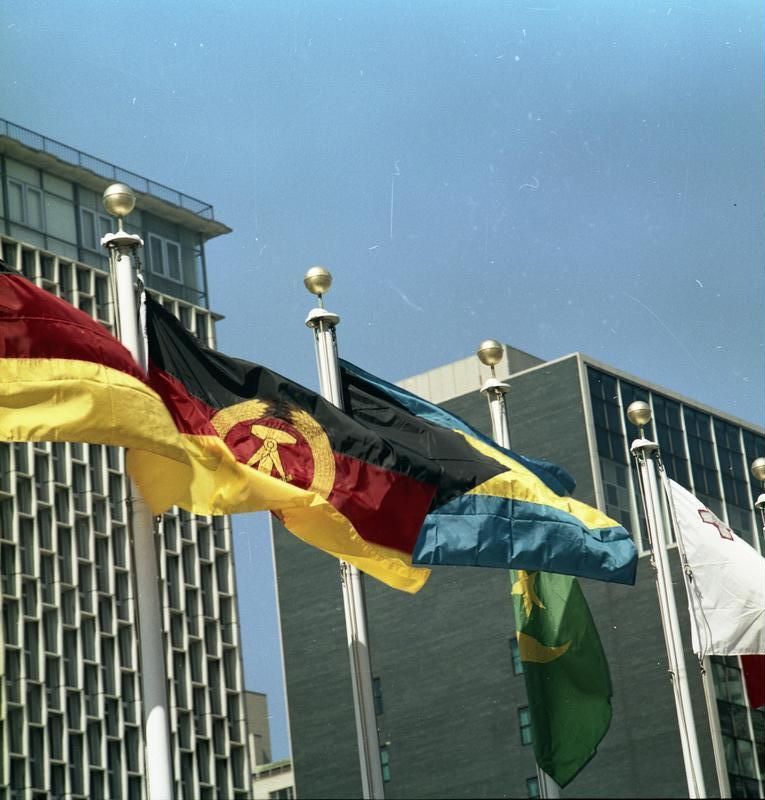
Flag of the GDR with the FRG at the UN headquarters

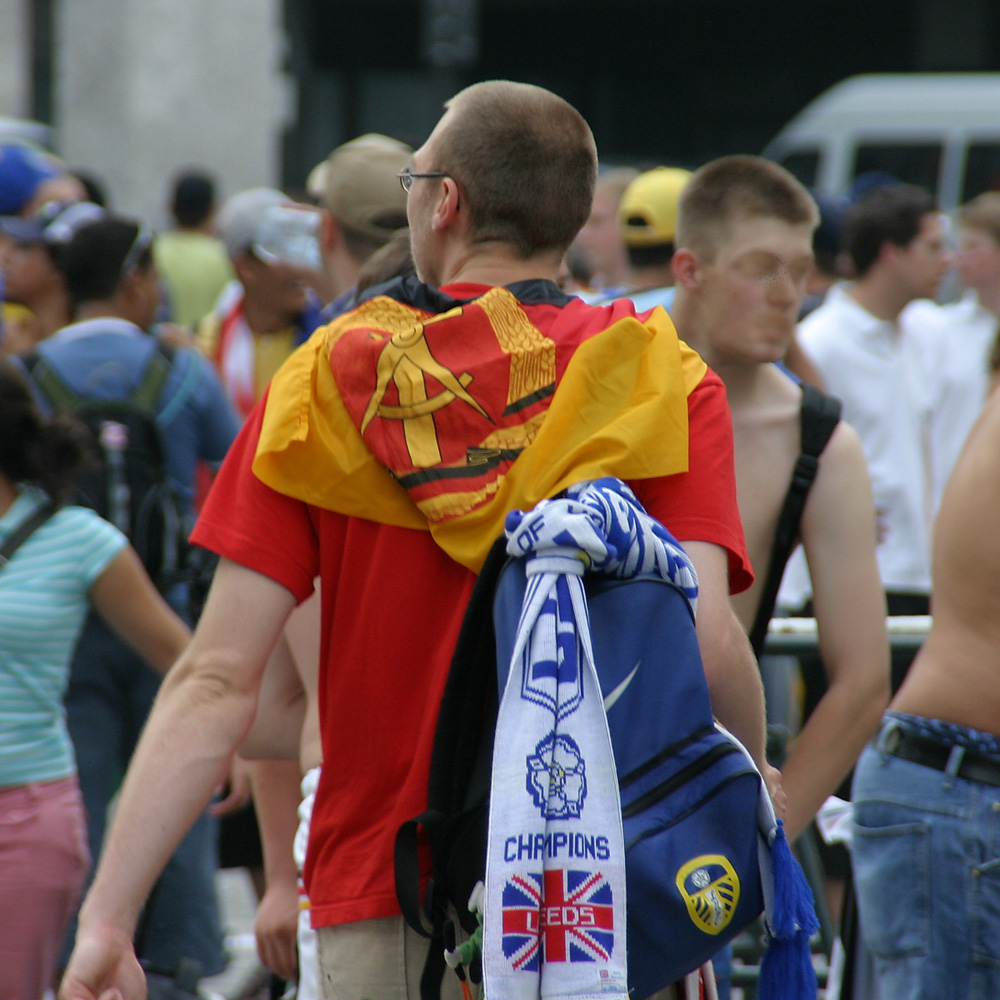
A fan with the GDR flag

== See also ==
- National emblem of East Germany
- Gallery of sovereign state flags
- List of German flags
