= National emblem of East Germany =

National Emblem of East Germany
- Armiger: German Democratic Republic
- Adopted: 26 September 1955
- Relinquished: 3 October 1990
- Shield: Gules a hammer and compass or
- Supporters: Ears of wheat
- Other elements: Ribbons in the colours of the German flag

The national emblem of East Germany was used to represent the German Democratic Republic from 1955 until German reunification. It featured a hammer and compass surrounded by a ring of wheat, an example of socialist heraldry. It was the only heraldic device of a European socialist state with a ring of grain which does not contain a red star.

== Description ==
The emblem adopted in 1955 depicted a hammer and compass surrounded by ears of wheat wrapped in the colours of the German flag. The hammer represented the workers in the factories. The compass represented the intelligentsia, and the rings of wheat the farmers. The first designs included only the hammer and ring of wheat, as an expression of the GDR as a communist Arbeiter-und-Bauern-Staat (German for "Workers' and Farmers' state"). When the federated states in East Germany were abolished and replaced by Bezirke, making the GDR into a unitary state, the national emblem came to be used by the Bezirke too. The East German government did not want regional symbols to be used, since they could stir up regional patriotism and movements for independence.

== History ==
=== Early proposals ===
Shortly after the German Democratic Republic was established, work began to create a national emblem for the new state. One of the projects of the coat of arms from November 1949 a variation of the German eagle with its head facing to the sinister side heraldically, encircled by the words "DEUTSCHE DEMOKRATISCHE REPUBLIK". This proposal was ultimately never used.

Another proposal created by Fritz Behrendt at the request of FDJ chairman Erich Honecker was done in the socialist style similar to that of the Soviet Union, depicting two wreaths of wheat wrapped with ribbons with the German national colours, with a ribbon in the center with the text "7. OKTOBER 1949", with the name of the state above a hammer within a gear. However, the design was not adopted as Behrendt was accused of being a Titoist and arrested in December 1949. Nevertheless, many of the elements in Behrendt's proposal such as the German tricolour ribbons and the hammer were eventually used in the emblem and its subsequent versions.

Proposed emblem with the German eagle

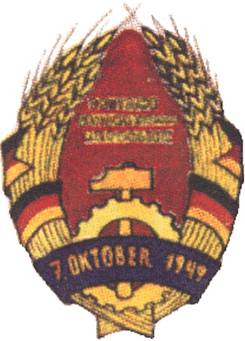
Proposed emblem by Fritz Behrendt (1949)

=== Unofficial emblems ===
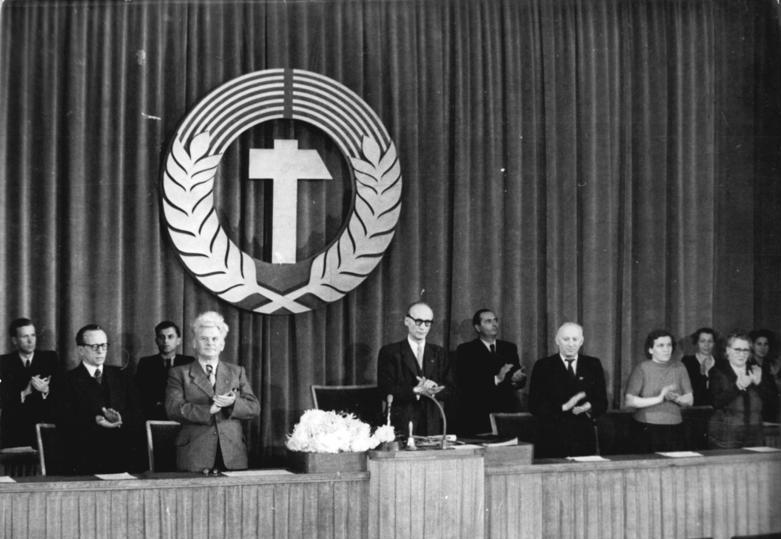
A meeting of the Volkskammer in 1950 with the emblem on the wall

Prior to 1955, the German Democratic Republic had no official state emblem. However, laws on passports and seals enacted in 1950 and 1953 respectively depicted an emblem that was de facto used as the national emblem. In spite of such use, Minister-President Otto Grotewohl urged that these emblems were semiofficial and should not be referred to as a national emblem in 1951.

On 12 January 1950, a regulation on diplomatic and official passports essentially marked the adoption of the first version of the national emblem. Although the law did not describe the emblem in words, it still appeared in the annex of the act that established the design of the passports. The emblem depicted a hammer within two ears of wheat. Although the law did not define it as the national emblem, the symbol took on the role of one, appearing hung on the wall during the first meeting of the Volkskammer later that year. Additionally, the emblem was used in other official documents, such as in house books. Variations emerged in the emblem's design, sometimes a red circle was added behind a black hammer.

Several years later, a decree creating the seal of the GDR featuring an emblem designed by Heinz Behling was enacted on 28 May 1953. This emblem showed a more detailed drawing of the two ears of wheat wrapped around by ribbons patterned on the German tricolour, with a hammer and a compass inside the wreath. The end of the wing of the compass faced the dexter heraldic side of the emblem. The colours of said emblem were not specified by the act, which only included a black and white image of the seal. The emblem shown on the seal once again was used as the de facto national emblem, being used in identity cards and appearing on stamps. Depictions of the emblem varied in the period after the law due to the lack of specification of the colours, sometimes reversing the orientation of the compass by making the end of the compass's wing face the sinister side and adding a coloured circle behind the hammer and compass.

National emblem of the GDR (12 January 1950 – 28 May 1953)

National emblem of the GDR (28 May 1953 – 26 September 1955)

The 1950 emblem with German tricolor

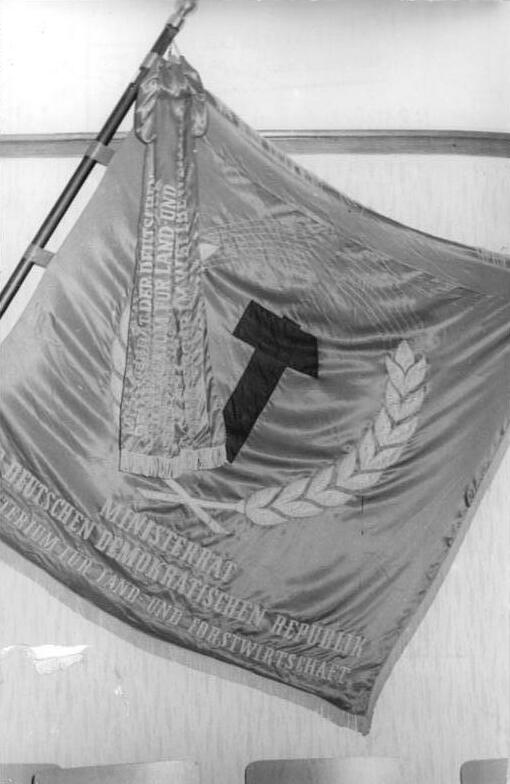
The 1950 emblem tricolor version on a 1953 Wanderfahne

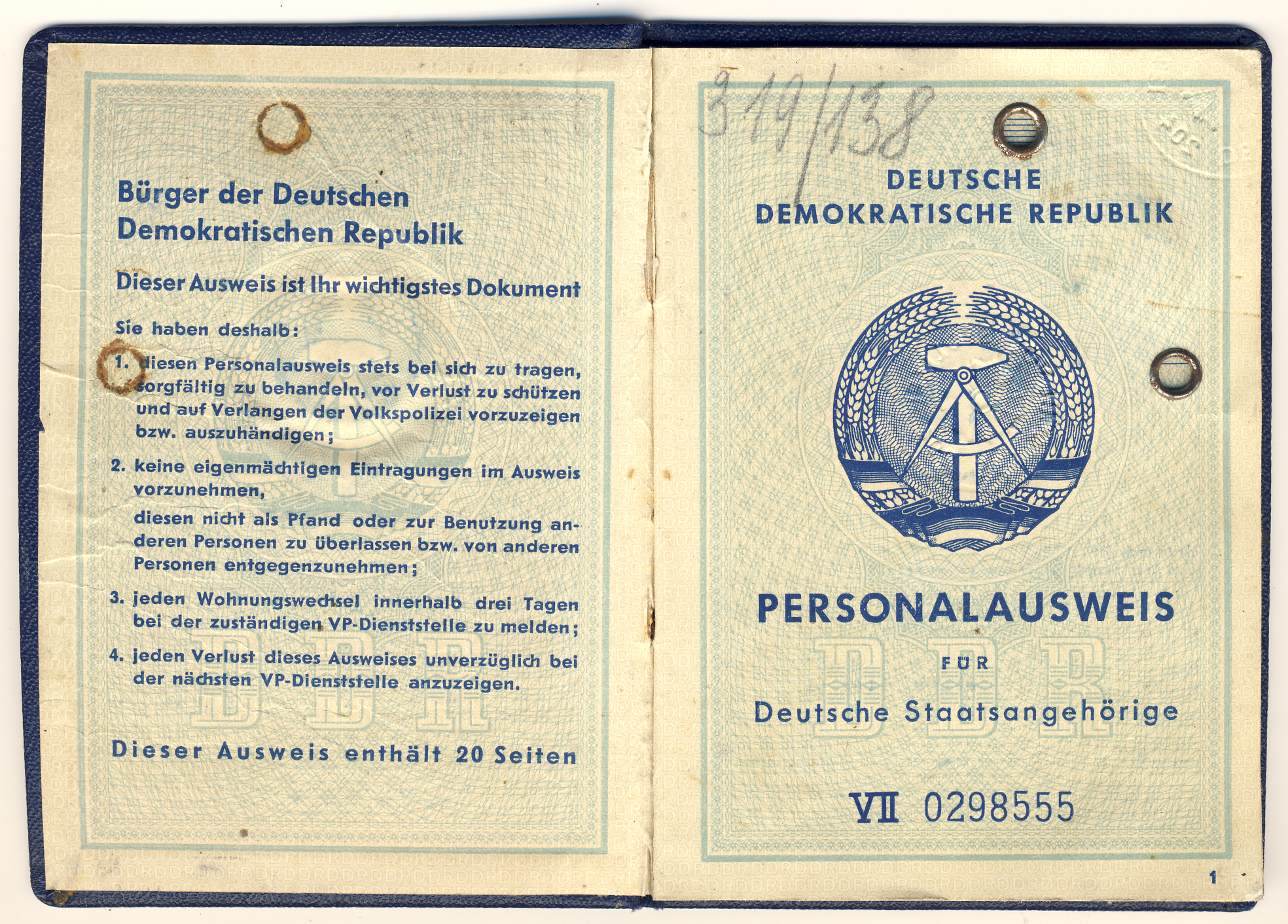
The emblem depicted in an identity card issued in February 1954

=== Official adoption ===
A formal national emblem for the German Democratic Republic was introduced by law on 26 September 1955. The national emblem was defined to be nearly identical to the emblem from the 1953 seal law. The national emblem law determined the colours of the emblem by adding a red circle behind the hammer and compass. The orientation of the compass was also fixed, making the end of the wing of the compass face the sinister side. This version of the national emblem remained in force for the rest of East Germany's existence. A stylised version of the emblem with less detailed ears of wheat later emerged which was commonly used in printed materials.

The emblem was added to the national flag by law of 1 October 1959. This caused the display of the East German flag, and by extension the emblem to be essentially illegal in West Germany and West Berlin. From 4 November 1959 to 4 February 1970, West German police were obliged to remove the flag whenever it was displayed.

The period following the fall of the Socialist Unity Party from power saw suggestions to completely redesign the emblem in 1990. One popular proposal was an image of a smith remaking a sword to a plough along with the text "Schwerter zu Pflugscharen" (German for "swords to ploughshares", from Isaiah 2:3–4), a well known symbol of peace. Changes to the emblem never occurred and the 1959 emblem was retained. On 31 May 1990, the newly elected Volkskammer decided, at a suggestion from the conservative German Social Union party, that all images of the national emblem on public buildings would be removed or covered. Use of the emblem became obsolete following the dissolution of the German Democratic Republic on 3 October 1990.

National emblem of the GDR (26 September 1955 – 3 October 1990)

Stylised version of the 1955 emblem

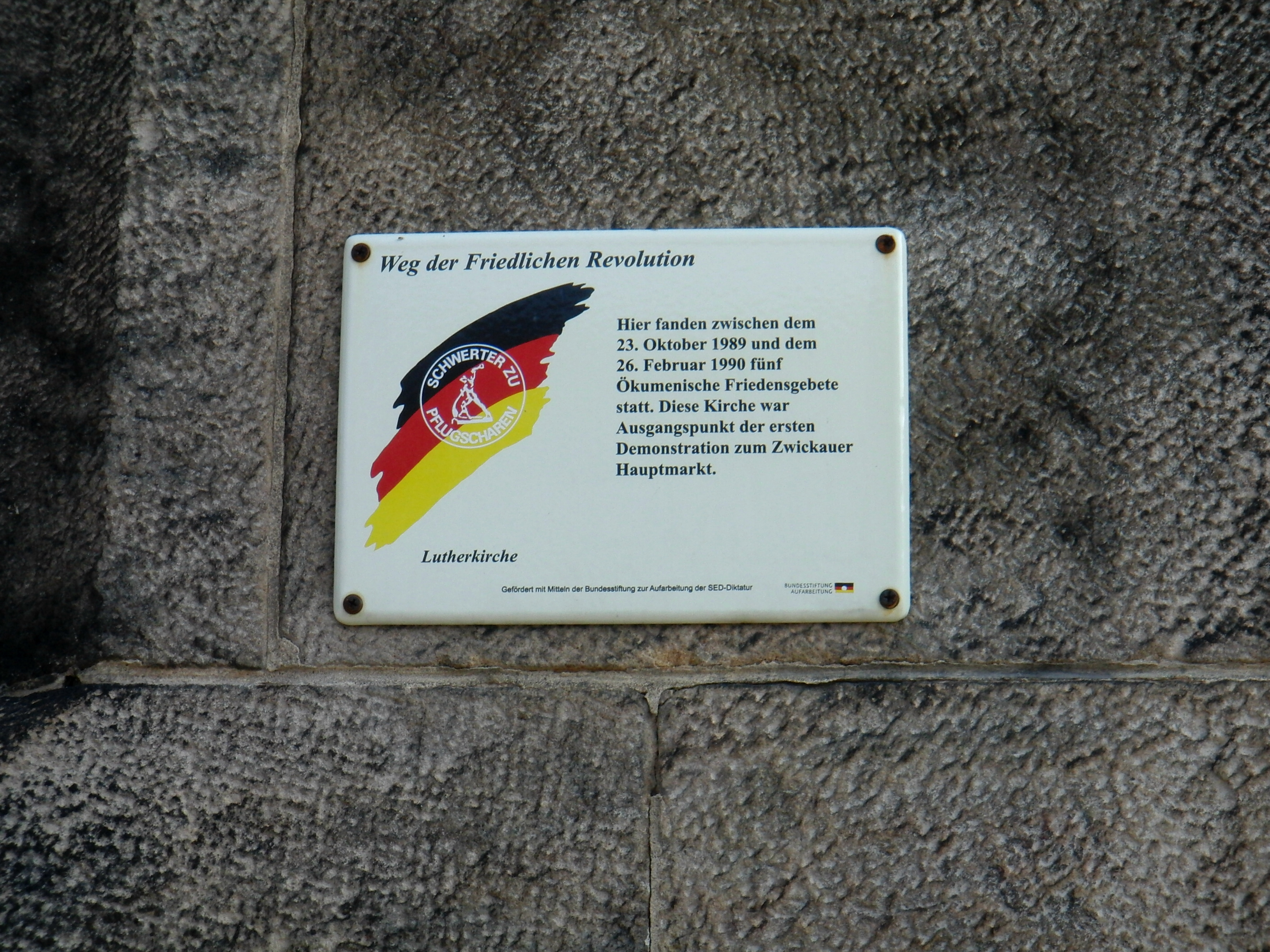
Swords into ploughshares emblem on a Peaceful Revolution memorial plaque

== See also ==
- Coat of arms of Germany
- State Emblem of the Soviet Union
- Hammer and sickle
- Square and Compasses
