= Annovka, Baltachevsky District, Republic of Bashkortostan =

Annovka Анновка
- Village
- Location within Bashkortostan Location within Russia
- Coordinates: 55°50′N 55°57′E
- Country: Russia
- Region: Bashkortostan
- District: Baltachevsky District
- Time zone: UTC+5:00

Annovka (Russian: Анновка) is a rural locality (a village) in Nizhnekaryshevsky Selsoviet, Baltachevsky District, Bashkortostan, Russia. The population was 71 as of 2010. There are 3 streets.

== Geography ==
Annovka is located 23 km south of Starobaltachevo (the district's administrative centre) by road. Nizhnekaryshevo is the nearest rural locality.
