= Annovka, Zilairsky District, Republic of Bashkortostan =

Annovka Анновка
- Village
- Location within Bashkortostan Location within Russia
- Coordinates: 52°07′N 57°29′E
- Country: Russia
- Region: Bashkortostan
- District: Zilairsky District
- Time zone: UTC+5:00

Annovka (Russian: Анновка) is a rural locality (a village) in Zilairsky Selsoviet, Zilairsky District, Bashkortostan, Russia. The population was 132 as of 2010. There are 4 streets.

== Geography ==
Annovka is located 15 km south of Zilair (the district's administrative centre) by road. Vasilyevka is the nearest rural locality.
