= Annovka, Belebeyevsky District, Republic of Bashkortostan =

Annovka Анновка
- Selo
- Church in Annovka

- Location within Bashkortostan Location within Russia
- Coordinates: 54°14′N 54°03′E
- Country: Russia
- Region: Bashkortostan
- District: Belebeyevsky District
- Time zone: UTC+5:00

Annovka (Russian: Анновка) is a rural locality (a selo) and the administrative centre of Annovsky Selsoviet, Belebeyevsky District, Bashkortostan, Russia. The population was 325 as of 2010. There are 4 streets.

== Geography ==
Annovka is located 18 km north of Belebey (the district's administrative centre) by road. Krasnorechka is the nearest rural locality.
