= Annovka, Belgorod Oblast =

Annovka Анновка
- Selo
- Location within Belgorod Oblast Location within Russia
- Coordinates: 50°46′N 37°28′E
- Country: Russia
- Region: Belgorod Oblast
- District: Korochansky District
- Time zone: UTC+3:00

Annovka (Russian: Анновка) is a rural locality (a selo) and the administrative center of Annovskoye Rural Settlement, Korochansky District, Belgorod Oblast, Russia. The population was 724 as of 2010. There are 2 streets.

== Geography ==
Annovka is located 24 km southeast of Korocha (the district's administrative centre) by road. Pritsepilovka is the nearest rural locality.
