= Emblem of the Russian Soviet Federative Socialist Republic =

- Armiger: Russian Soviet Federative Socialist Republic
- Adopted: 10 July 1918
- Relinquished: 6 December 1993
- Crest: Red star
- Motto: Пролетарии всех стран, соединяйтесь! (Russian for: "Workers of the world, unite!)

The emblem of the Russian Soviet Federative Socialist Republic (Note: The design of an emblem is different to that of a coat of arms. The latter should follow the rules of heraldry and so contain a shield (escutcheon) in the center. However, many unheraldic national emblems are colloquially called national coats of arms anyway, because they are used for the same purposes as national coats of arms.) was adopted on 10 July 1918 by the Government of the Soviet Union, and had been modified several times afterwards. It shows wheat as the symbol of agriculture, a rising sun to symbolize the republic's future, the red star (Note: The RSFSR was the last Soviet Republic to include the star in its state emblem, in 1978.) as well as the hammer and sickle in front of a rising sun in a cartouche (design) style shield for the victory of communism and the "world-wide socialist community of states".

Like other state emblems of Soviet Socialist Republics, the Soviet Union state motto "Workers of the world, unite!" (in Russian: «Пролетарии всех стран, соединяйтесь!») is embedded in the coat of arms.

The acronym shown above the hammer and sickle reads PCФCP, for Российская Советская Федеративная Социалистическая Республика.

Similar emblems were used by the Autonomous Soviet Socialist Republics (ASSR) within the Russian SFSR; the main differences were generally the use of the republic's acronym and the presence of the motto in the languages of the titular nations (with the exception of the state emblem of the Dagestan ASSR, which had the motto in eleven languages as there is no single Dagestani language).

In 1992, after the dissolution of the Soviet Union, the inscription was changed from RSFSR (РСФСР) to the Russian Federation (Российская Федерация) in connection with the change of the name of the state. In 1993, the socialist design was replaced by the present coat of arms.

== History ==
=== First version ===
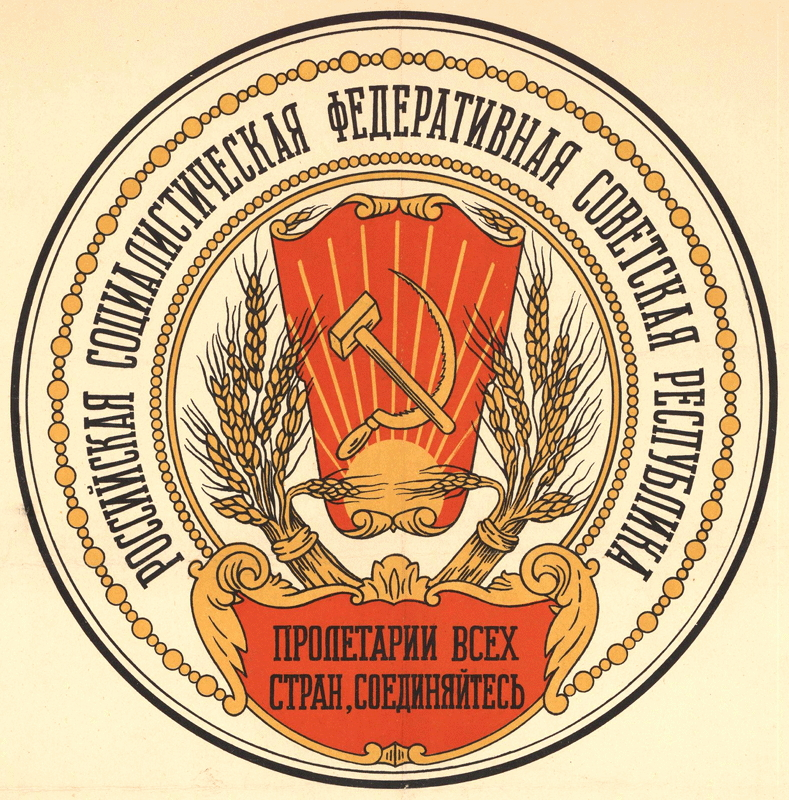
Valid for 1918–1920

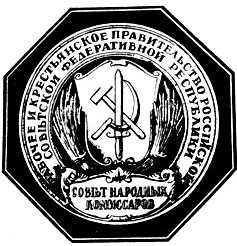
Drawing by Alexander N. Leo

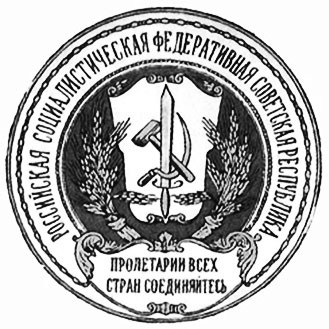
Drawing by Alexander N. Leo

Early designs included a sword in addition to the hammer and sickle, but Vladimir Lenin rejected it according to the memoirs of Vladimir Bonch-Bruyevich. The hammer, sickle and sword returned in the 1920s as a symbol of the Soviet secret police agencies.

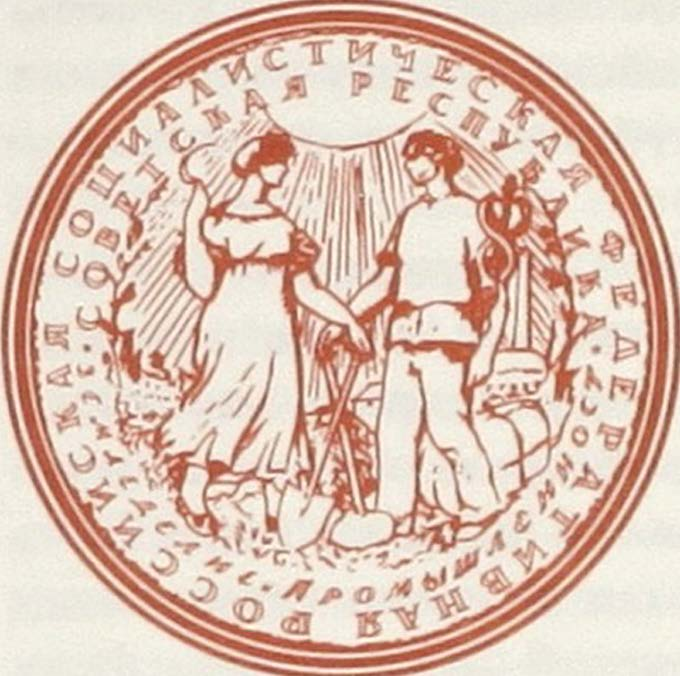
Proposed Coat of Arms of the RSFSR by Sergey Chekhonin.

Proposed Coat of Arms of the RSFSR by Casimir Dunin-Borkowski.

On 24 January 1918, the Secretary of the Council of People's Commissars, N. P. Gorbunov, appealed to the All-Russia Union of Masters and Technicians of factory enterprises with a request to provide a sample of a new seal of the Russian SFSR for discussion by the government. By the beginning of March 1918, a print drawing was ready, and a sword was depicted in its center. The authorship of the press is attributed to the artist Alexander Nikolaevich Leo, although it is not known for certain.

On 17 April 1918, at the meeting of the Council of People's Commissars, the question of the stamp seal was discussed, the Department of Affairs of the Council of People's Commissars was asked to create a Regulation on the procedure for its use. On 20 April, N. P. Gorbunov addressed the commission of the Small Council of People's Commissars with a report on the progress of printing. A print project was approved (with a sword), but the drawing still had to be approved by the Big SNK. Before putting the question to the final statement, Lenin suggested adding the word "socialist" to the press and removing the sword from the press, which was already done at the evening session on 20 April. On 15 May, at the meeting of the Small Council of People's Commissars, a drawing of the press was signed with the inscription: "Workers 'and Peasants' Government of the Russian Socialist Federative Republic," but again the desire was expressed to put a sword on print. After Lenin's speeches, the Small Council of People's Commissars decided to "throw out a sword from the drawing."

On 18 June 1918, at the meeting of the Council of People's Commissars, Y. Sverdlov's report "On the Soviet Press" was heard, the print project was approved in general, and the details (the question of the sword and the exact text of the inscription) were clarified the next day, 19 June. Thus, the seal had the following appearance: in the center on a shield-cartouche framed with grain ears, a crossed sickle and a hammer; below in the vignette text: "ПРОЛЕТАРИИ ВСЕХ СТРАН, СОЕДИНЯЙТЕСЬ !" (instead of the "Council of People's Commissars" in the first draft), and on the circumference: "РОССИЙСКАЯ СОЦИАЛИСТИЧЕСКАЯ ФЕДЕРАТИВНАЯ СОВЕТСКАЯ РЕСПУБЛИКА" (instead of "Workers and Peasants ....."). Artist DV Emelyanov 20 June 1918 began to make a copper seal. The impression of the first press of the SNK was given by VI Lenin in a letter to Clara Zetkin.

==== Approval ====
10 July 1918 at the closing session of the 5th All-Russian Congress of Soviets of Workers', Peasants', Soldiers' and Cossack deputies adopted the Constitution of the RSFSR, which formally approved the arms of the republic:

"Chapter XVII, Section 6, § 89. The emblem of the Russian Socialist Federative Soviet Republic consists of images on a red background in the sun's rays of a gold sickle and hammer, placed crisscrossed with handles downwards, surrounded by a wreath of ears and with the inscription: a) The Russian Socialist Federative Soviet Republic b) Workers of all countries, unite! ".

The coat of arms is identical to the seal which was adopted on 19 June. The only difference were in the presence of sun rays and in the precise indication of colors. The coat of arms for the first edition of the Constitution was created by the artist from Petrograd minting, A. F. Vasyutinsky.

==== Other versions ====
- In parallel with the Department of Affairs of the Council of People's Commissars, the People's Commissariat for Education dealt with the development of the press. The Arts Department of the People's Commissariat for Education in May 1918 organized a competition to develop the emblem of the Russian Republic. According to the terms of the competition, a figure of a worker and a peasant, the text "РСФСР", the tools of labor, the slogan "Workers of all countries, unite!" should be represented in the arms. According to the results of the contest, the best projects were the projects of Miturich, Altman, and S. V. Chekhonin.
- On the cover of the first edition of the Constitution of the Russian SFSR, another emblem for the RSFSR was painted by the artist E. Lansere. On the figure board there were a sickle and a hammer in the rays of the sun, around them a wreath tied with a gold ribbon, on the intercepts of which were written the red letters "RSFSR"; above the hammer and sickle the motto; behind the shield two lictor beams (a symbol of power); in the lower part of the branch of oak.

=== Second version ===
Versions valid in the years:
1920-1956	1956-1978	1978–1992

In early 1920, the All-Russian Central Executive Committee decided to improve the artistic form of the press (and the coat of arms). 20 July 1920 was approved by the All-Russian Central Executive Committee, a new version of the coat of arms, designed by the artist N.A. Andreev. The motto was now placed on the red ribbon in the lower part of the coat of arms, the name of the republic was given in abbreviated form "RSFSR" and was in the upper part of the shield, on each side of the shield-cartouche surrounded by 7 ears. The image of the abbreviation "RSFSR" instead of the full name "Russian Socialist Federative Soviet Republic" was established by the new Constitution of the RSFSR adopted on 11 May 1925 by the XII All-Russian Congress of Soviets, article 87 of which read:

"87. The State Emblem of the Russian Socialist Federative Soviet Republic consists of an image on a red background in the sunlight of a golden sickle and hammer, placed cross-on-the-cross, handles down, surrounded by a wreath of ears, with the inscription: a) RSFSR.R. and b) Workers of all countries, unite! "

On 30 December 1922, the RSFSR, the Ukrainian SSR, the Byelorussian SSR and the Transcaucasian Socialist Federal Soviet Republic formed the Union of Soviet Socialist Republics.

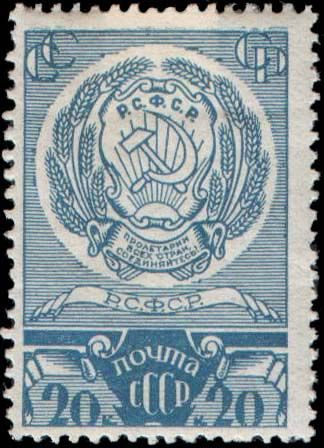
Emblem of the RSFSR on a 1937 postage stamp

Under Stalin's Constitution, adopted on 21 January 1937, the coat of arms remained unchanged, but the abbreviation of the RSFSR was now deciphered differently: the Russian Soviet Federative Socialist Republic. In the Constitution of 1937 the coat of arms was described as follows:

"Article 148. The State Emblem of the Russian Soviet Federative Socialist Republic consists of an image of a gold sickle and a hammer, placed cross on a cross, with handles down, on a red background in the sun and framed with ears, with the inscription:" R.S.F.S.R. "and" Workers of all countries, unite! "

==== First revision ====
In accordance with the "Rules of Russian spelling and punctuation" approved in 1956, abbreviations in the Russian language began to be written without dividing points, which was reflected in the description of the emblem in the Constitution of the RSFSR and in the practice of depicting the State Emblem of the RSFSR.

==== Second revision ====
On 12 April 1978, the extraordinary seventh session of the Supreme Soviet of the RSFSR of the ninth convocation adopted a new (so-called "Brezhnev") Constitution (Basic Law) of the RSFSR, the five-pointed star was added to the description of the emblem:

Article 180. The State Emblem of the Russian Soviet Federative Socialist Republic is an image of a sickle and a hammer on a red background in the sun and framed with ears of wheat with the inscription: "RSFSR" and "Proletarians of all countries, unite!" At the top of the emblem is a five-pointed star.

Officially, the drawing of the new coat of arms with the star was established by a new edition of the Regulations on the State Emblem of the RSFSR, approved by the Decree of the Presidium of the Supreme Soviet of the RSFSR of 22 January 1981, which specified that "in the color image of the State Emblem of the RSFSR, the sickle and the golden hammer, the red star, border ". At the same time, on the color image of the emblem attached to the Regulations, the inscriptions "RSFSR" and "Proletarians of all countries, unite!" were depicted in a dark brown color.

== Gallery ==
The version serving as the coat of arms of the Russian Federation (16 May 1992-1 December 1993)

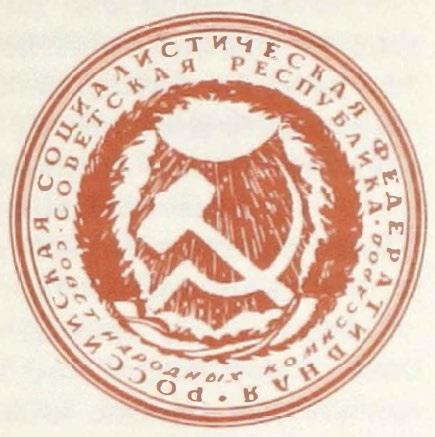
Seal used by All-Russian Central Executive Committee

Proposed seal design for the Council of People's Commissars by Ivan Puni (1920s)

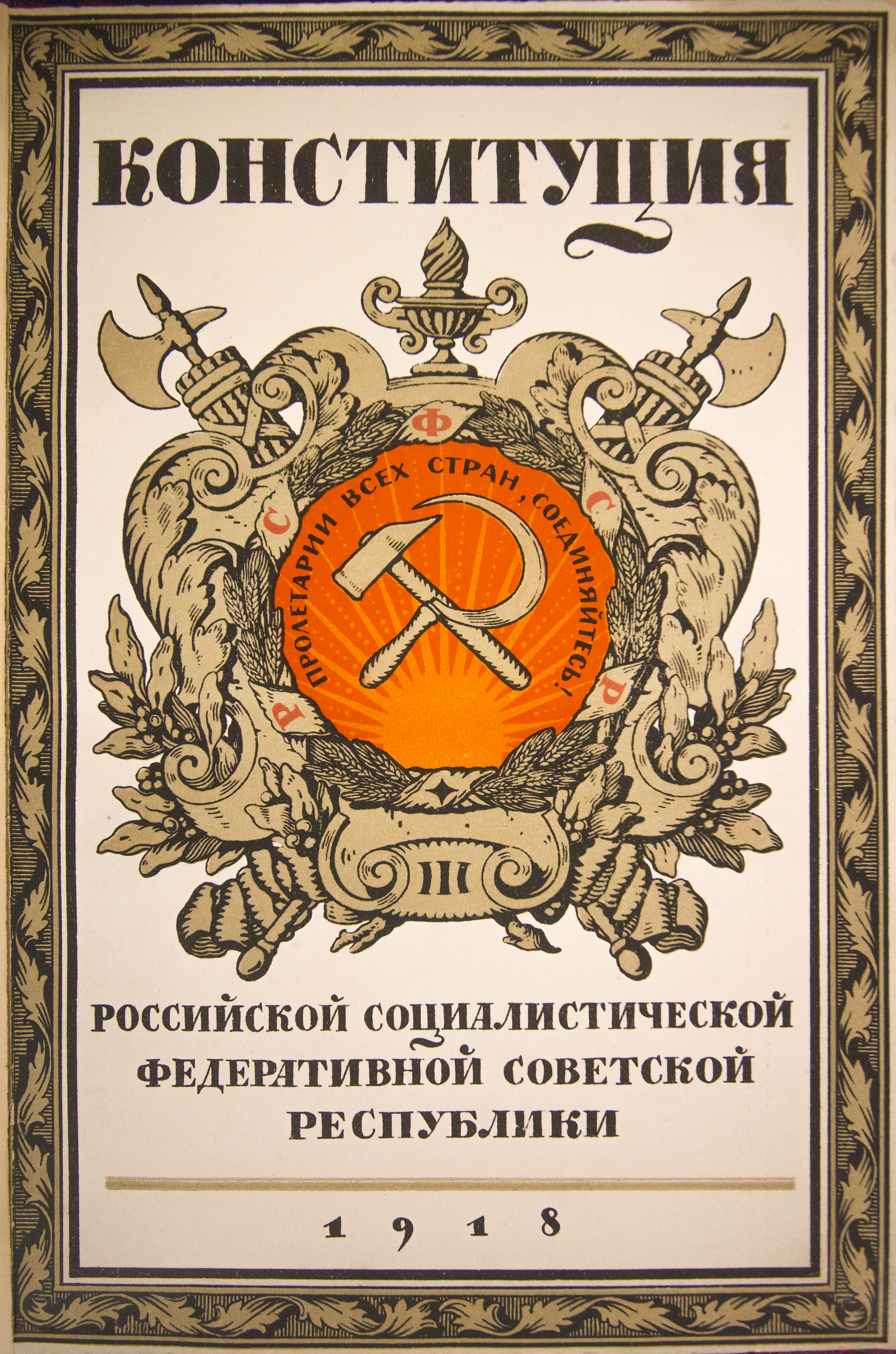
Cover of the 1918 Constitution of Soviet Russia. The drawing on the cover of the constitution is often confused with the coat of arms; the constitution itself introduced a different emblem.

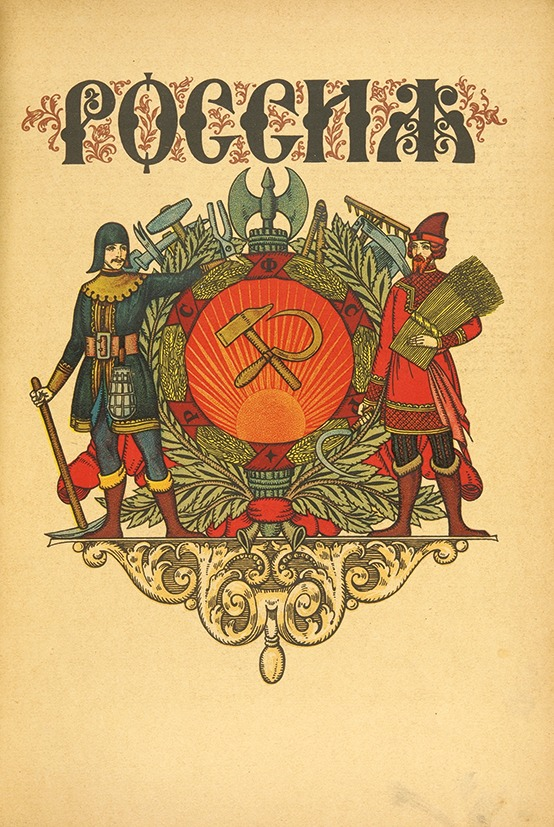
Coat of arms printed in the official Soviet Calendar for 1919

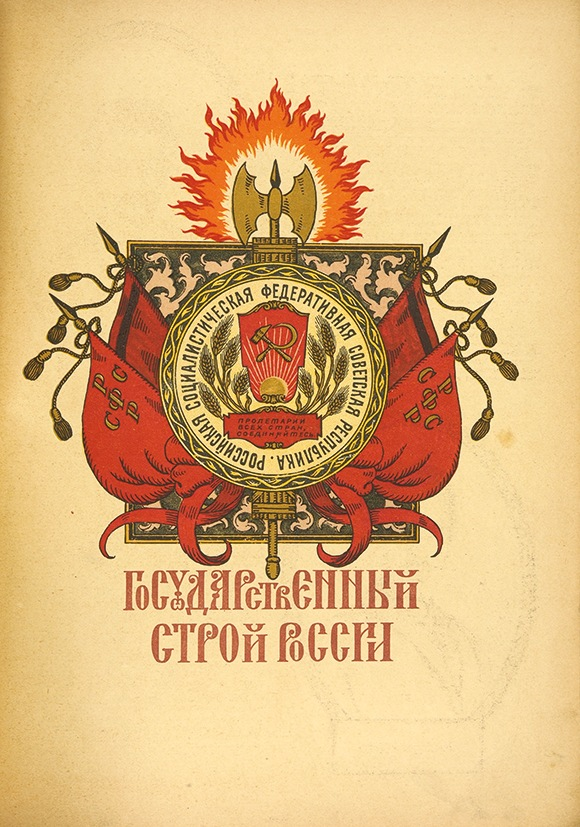
Coat of arms printed in the official Soviet Calendar for 1919

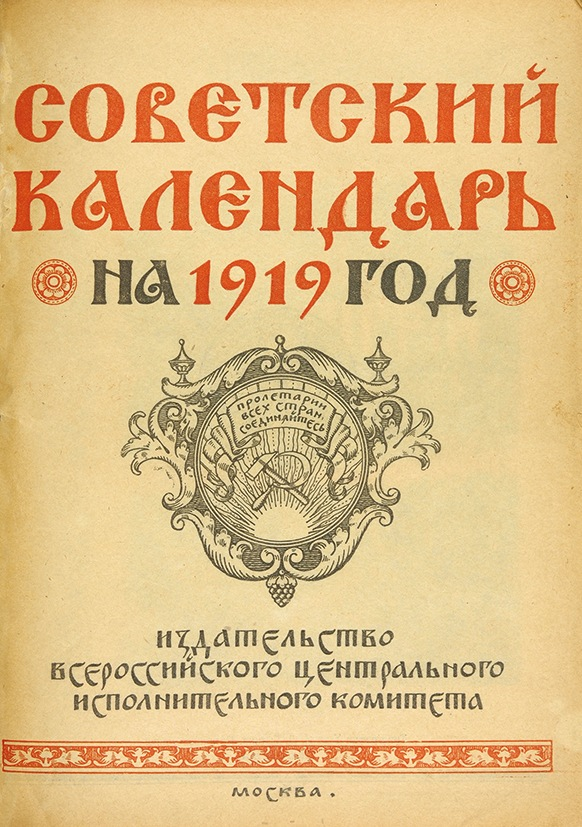
Coat of arms printed in the official Soviet Calendar for 1919

Early awarding of the Order of the Red Banner with artistic development of the first emblem.

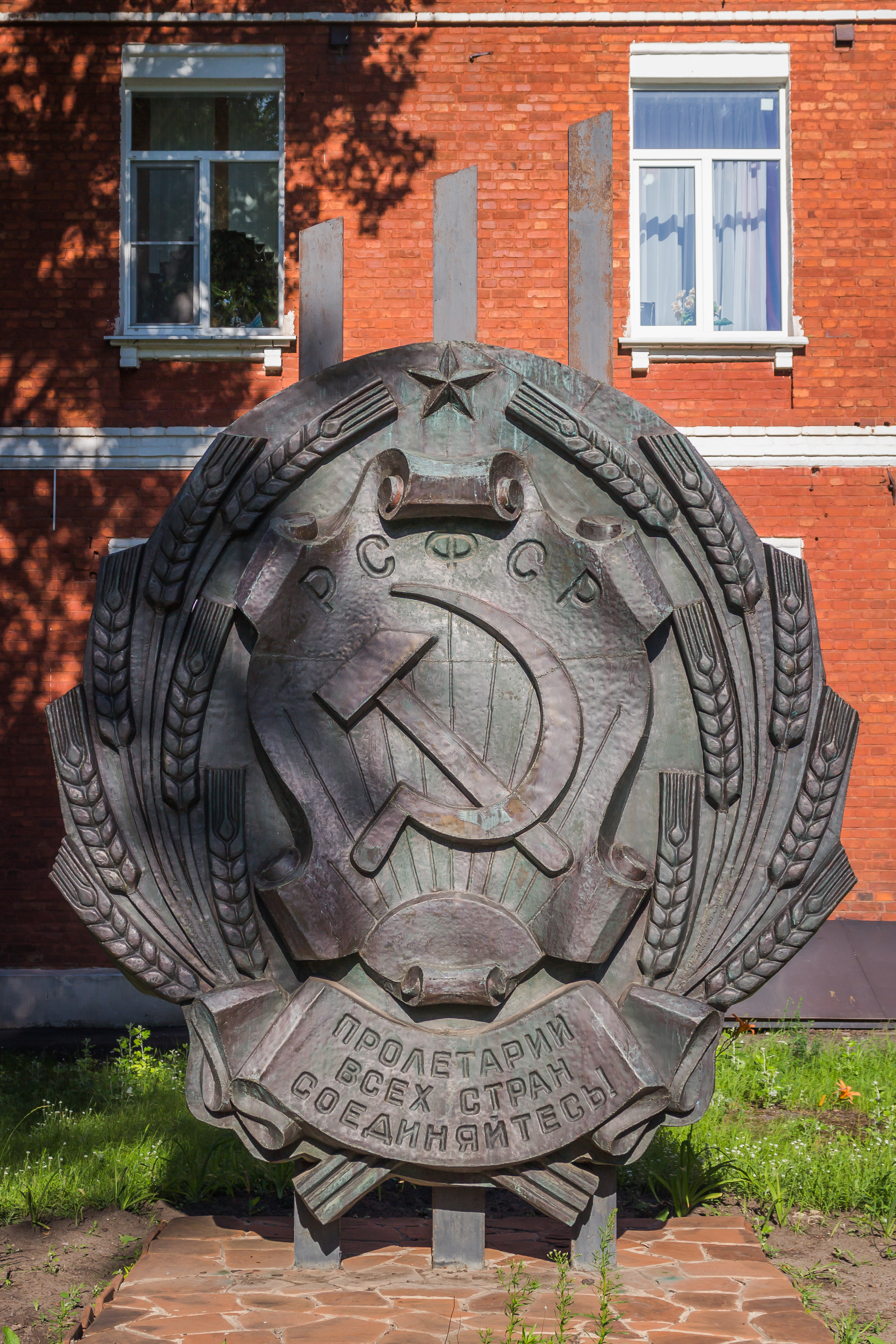
A sculpture of the emblem in front of a former military building in Kotovsk, Tambov Oblast.

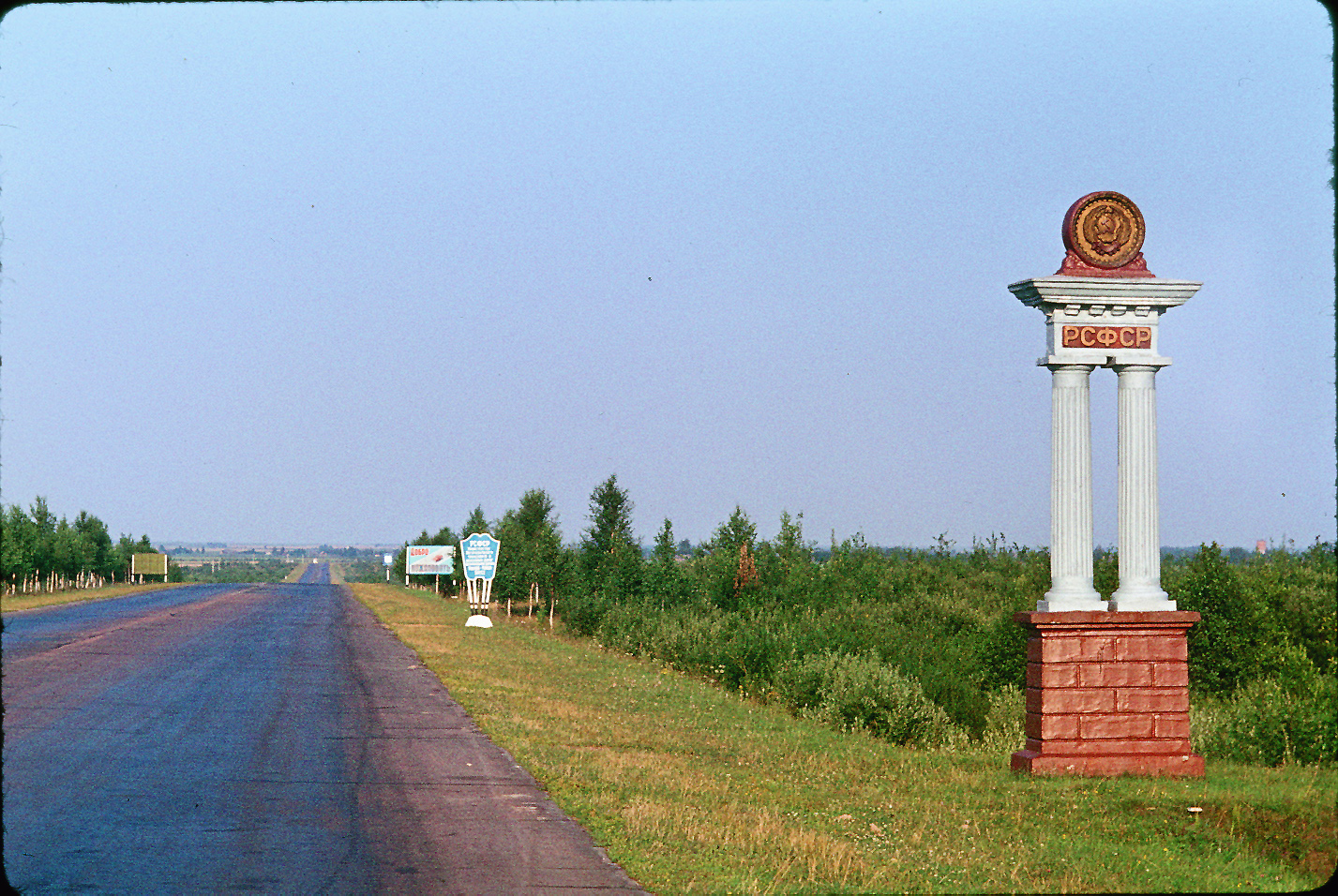
Road greeting on the border of the BSSR and the RSFSR, 1964.

== See also ==
- State Emblem of the Soviet Union
- Emblems of the Soviet Republics
- Coat of arms of Russia
