= Annovka, Voronezh Oblast =

Annovka Анновка
- Selo
- Location within Voronezh Oblast Location within Russia
- Coordinates: 50°59′N 40°18′E
- Country: Russia
- Region: Voronezh Oblast
- District: Bobrovsky District
- Time zone: UTC+3:00

Annovka (Russian: Анновка) is a rural locality (a selo) and the administrative center of Annovskoye Rural Settlement, Bobrovsky District, Voronezh Oblast, Russia. The population was 543 as of 2010. There are 4 streets.

== Geography ==
Annovka is located 29 km southeast of Bobrov (the district's administrative centre) by road. Semyono-Aleksandrovka is the nearest rural locality.
