= Annovka, Kuyurgazinsky District, Republic of Bashkortostan =

Annovka Анновка
- Village
- Location within Bashkortostan Location within Russia
- Coordinates: 52°47′N 55°54′E
- Country: Russia
- Region: Bashkortostan
- District: Kuyurgazinsky District
- Time zone: UTC+5:00

Annovka (Russian: Анновка) is a rural locality (a village) in Leninsky Selsoviet, Kuyurgazinsky District, Bashkortostan, Russia. The population was 1 as of 2010. There is 1 street.

== Geography ==
Annovka is located 30 km northeast of Yermolayevo (the district's administrative centre) by road. Balza is the nearest rural locality.
