= Coat of arms of Gagauzia =

Symbol of the Autonomous Territorial Unit of Gagauzia in Moldova

Versions
- Emblem of the Gagauz Republic (1989–1995)
- Armiger: Government of Gagauzia
- Adopted: 1994
- Crest: Three mullets Or
- Torse: None
- Shield: Azure, a sun in splendour Or, in chief a ribbon Argent with the inscription 'GAGAUZI YERI' Sable.
- Supporters: Stalks of wheat and grape
- Order(s): None

The coat of arms of Gagauzia are described in Article 13.3 of the Organic Law of Gagauzia as follows:

The coat of arms represents an image of heraldic shield, on the lower part of which there is a yellow (golden) hemisphere of rising sun on blue background. The shield is framed by yellow (golden) spikes enlaced by the flag of Gagauzia. Under the shield there is a conventional image of vine-leaves and vine-bunches. Three five-pointed yellow (golden) stars are arranged in form of an equilateral triangle above the shield.

== See also ==
- Flag of Gagauzia
