= Ivanovka, Ivanovsky District, Amur Oblast =

Rural locality in Amur Oblast, Russia

Coordinates: 50.358°N 127.994°E

Ivanovka (Russian: Ивановка) is a rural locality (a selo) and the administrative center of Ivanovsky District of Amur Oblast, Russia. Population: 6,617 (2010 census); 6,785 (2002 census); 7,068 (1989 Soviet census).
