= Ivanovsky District, Amur Oblast =

Ivanovsky District Ивановский район (Russian)
- District
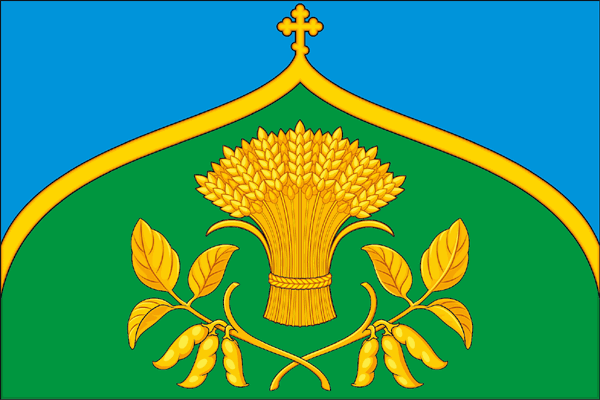
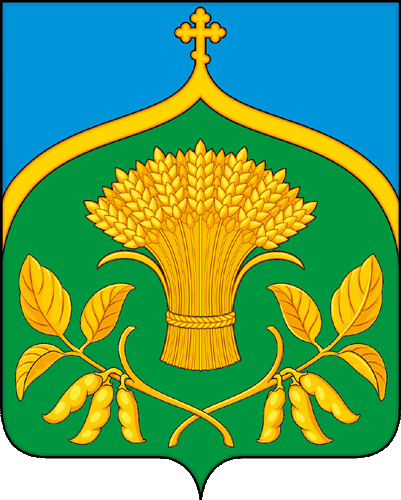
- Flag Coat of arms
- Location of Ivanovsky District in Amur Oblast
- Coordinates: 50°21′50″N 128°00′03″E
- Country: Russia
- Federal subject: Amur Oblast
- Established: 1926
- Administrative center: Ivanovka

Area
  - Total: 2,655 km^{2} (1,025 sq mi)

Population (2010 Census)
  - Total: 26,509
  - Density: 9.985/km^{2} (25.86/sq mi)
  - Urban: 0%
  - Rural: 100%

Administrative structure
  - Administrative divisions: 14 Rural settlements
  - Inhabited localities: 33 rural localities

Municipal structure
  - Municipally incorporated as: Ivanovsky Municipal District
  - Municipal divisions: 0 urban settlements, 14 rural settlements
- Time zone: UTC+9 (MSK+6)
- OKTMO ID: 10628000
- Website: http://ivanovka.amsu.ru

Ivanovsky District (Russian: Ива́новский райо́н) is an administrative and municipal district (raion), one of the twenty in Amur Oblast, Russia. The area of the district is 2,655 square kilometers (1,025 sq mi). Its administrative center is the rural locality (a selo) of Ivanovka. Population: 26,509 (2010 census); 29,496 (2002 Census); 32,488 (1989 Soviet census). The population of Ivanovka accounts for 25.0% of the district's total population.
