= Coat of arms of Almaty =

- Armiger: Erbolat Dosaev, Äkim of Almaty
- Adopted: July 6, 1993
- Shield: Eastern
- Motto: "Almaty"

The coat of arms of Almaty is one of the official symbols of the city of Almaty in Kazakhstan. It was adopted on July 6, 1993.

== Description and symbolism ==
The official coat of arms' description:

The coat of arms of the city of Almaty is a base in the form of a round eastern shield, in the foreground of which is snow leopard depicted holding a branch with eight apple-tree flowers in its mouth, which personify eight districts of the city of Almaty. The leopard walks forward with a confident gait, its right paw is raised up for the next step forward, but at the same time the leopard's head is turned back, which indicates the continuity in the development of the city from ancient times to the present. In the background is the snowy peak of the majestic mountains of Alatau, in the fertile area of which the city of Almaty is located. The background of the entire coat of arms is blue - the color of flag of the Republic of Kazakhstan. The circle is framed with decorative linear ribbons and nests uyka with elements of shanyrak. On a gold background, the Kazakh national ornament is depicted in red around the ring, which is intertwined with the fonts in the word "Almaty". The coat of arms of the city includes the following colors: gold, red, blue, white, pink and silver.

The coat of arms' author is Shaken Niyazbekov, who also designed the flag of Kazakhstan.
