= Rakhat =

Rakhat may refer to:

== Organizations ==
- Lotte Rakhat, a Kazakh confectionery company

== People ==
- Rakhat Achylova, a Kyrgyz sociologist
- Rakhat Aliyev, a Kazakh politician
- Rakhat-Bi Abdyssagin, a Kazakh musician

== Places ==
- Madeniyet, a village in Almaty Region, Kazakhstan, also known as Rakhat
