= List of Kazakh flags =

This is a list of flags which are used in Kazakhstan and flags which were used in history.

== National flag ==
Flag	Date	Use	Description
	1992–present	Flag of Kazakhstan	A gold sun with 32 rays above a soaring golden steppe eagle, both centred on a turquoise field and shifted towards the fly. The hoist edge displays a national ornamental pattern ("ram's horn") in gold.

== Presidential flag ==
Flag	Date	Use	Description
	1995–2012	Standard of the president of Kazakhstan	
	2012–present	Standard of the president of Kazakhstan	

== Military flags ==
Flag	Date	Use	Description
		War flag of Kazakhstan Armed Forces	
		Flag of the Kazakh Ground Forces	Similar to the national flag without the ornamental pattern, and the addition of a red star in the canton.
		Flag of the Kazakhstan Air Force	
		Flag of the Kazakhstan Air Defense Forces	
		Flag of the Kazakhstan Airborne Troops	
		Flag of the Internal Troops of Kazakhstan	
		Flag of the Kazakhstan National Guard	
		Flag of the Kazakh Border Service	
		Flag of the Ministry of Emergency Situations	
		Flag of the Foreign Intelligence Service	

== Naval flags ==
Flag	Date	Use	Description
		Naval ensign of the Kazakh Naval Force	
		Naval jack of the Kazakh Naval Force	
		Government ensign of Kazakhstan	
		Border Service ensign of Kazakhstan	

=== Rank flag ===
Flag	Date	Use	Description
		Standard of the Minister of National Defense	

== Non-Military Security Forces Flag ==
Flag	Date	Use	Description
		Flag of the Kazakhstan Customs Bureau	
		Flag of the Kazakhstan Tax Service	

== Scouts ==
Flag	Date	Use	Description
Link to file	1992–present	Flag of the Organization of the Scout Movement of Kazakhstan	

== Administrative divisions ==
=== Cities with special status ===
Flag	Date	Use	Description
		Flag of Almaty	
		Flag of Astana	
		Flag of Baikonur	

=== Regions ===
Flag	Date	Use	Description
		Flag of Almaty Region	
		Flag of Karaganda Region	

=== Districts ===
Flag	Date	Use	Description
		Flag of Akkol District	
		Flag of Medeu District	
		Flag of Tarbagatay District	
		Flag of Uzunkol District	

=== Cities/towns ===
Flag	Date	Use	Description
		Flag of Aksu	
		Flag of Aktobe	
		Flag of Atyrau	
		Flag of Kapchagay	
		Flag of Karaganda	
		Flag of Kostanay	
		Flag of Pavlodar	
		Flag of Oskemen	
		Flag of Taldıqorğan	
		Flag of Tekeli	
		Flag of Temirtau	
		Flag of Zhetikara	

== Historical flags ==
Flag	Date	Use	Description
	14th–16th century	Flag of the Golden Horde	
	1917–1920	Flag of the Alash Autonomy	A horizontal green, red, and yellow tricolour with a white star and crescent in the canton.
	1917–1920	Second version of the flag of the Alash Autonomy	A vertical green, red, and yellow tricolour with a white star and crescent in the canton.
	1920–1936	Flag of the Kazakh Autonomous Socialist Soviet Republic	
	1937–1940	Flag of the Kazakh Soviet Socialist Republic	
	1940–1953	Flag of the Kazakh Soviet Socialist Republic	
	1953–1991	Flag of the Kazakh Soviet Socialist Republic	Flag of the Kazakh Soviet Socialist Republic.
	1991–1992	Flag of the Republic of Kazakhstan	Flag of the Kazakh Soviet Socialist Republic.
	1953–1991	Flag of the Kazakh Soviet Socialist Republic (reversed)	All flags of the constituent republics of the Soviet Union did not bear the hammer and sickle on their reverse side.
	1991–1992	Flag of the Republic of Kazakhstan (reversed)	All flags of the constituent republics of the Soviet Union did not bear the hammer and sickle on their reverse side.

=== Proposed flags ===
Flag	Date	Use	Description
	1991	Proposal 1	
	1991	Proposal 2	
	1991	Proposal 3	
	1991	Proposal 4	
	1991	Proposal 5	
	1991	Proposal 6	
	1991	Proposal 7	
	1991	Proposal 8	

== Political flags ==
Flag	Date	Party	Description
Current
Link to file	2006–present	Socialist Movement of Kazakhstan	
	1991–present	Azat Republican Party of Kazakhstan	
	1990–present	Alash National Freedom Party	
Former
	1990s–2015	Communist Party of Kazakhstan	A red field with a gold hammer and sickle in the top left.
	1990s	Communist Party of Kazakhstan	Flag of the Kazakh Soviet Socialist Republic
Link to file	2003–2006	Asar	
Link to file	2004–2013	Democratic Party Adilet	
	1917–1920	Alash	

== See also ==
- Flag of Kazakhstan
- Emblem of Kazakhstan
