= Tulpar =

Winged or swift horse in Turkic mythology

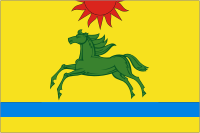
Horse on the flag of Argayashsky District, an area with a predominant Bashkir population.

Tulpar is a legendary winged or celestial horse in Turkic mythology. The origins of Tulpar are intertwined with the hunting traditions of Central Asian peoples, who used horses and falconry birds. Over time, these two animals merged in the human imagination, creating the winged horse known as Tulpar.

== Heraldry and depictions ==
Tulpar is embedded in the cultural heritage of Turkic-speaking nations, including Turks, Uzbeks, Bashkirs, Kazakhs and Kyrgyz.

The emblem of Kazakhstan includes two golden tulpars, a yurt's top, and sun rays on a blue background symbolizing the sky where tulpars gallop.

Winged horses, depicted in the art of ancient nomads, on metal jewelry of the Altai Sakas, on the Kargaly diadem, on the headdress of the Golden Man from the Issyk Mound, and on Scythian dishes. A notable artifact, a ceremonial gilt bronze finial depicting a standing horse, exemplifies Saka culture.

Emblem of Kazakhstan, featuring two golden tulpars

== Mythological and cosmological interpretations ==
In various cultures of Eurasia, the image of the heavenly horse links the earthly realm to the celestial and serving as a guide to the sphere of immortality. In the Chinese tradition (Han period), the "heavenly horse" (tianma, 天马) was believed to have "come from the West" and to have "emerged from springs", that is, from the mythic source of the world's waters. The mention of the horse appearing from a spring (泉水) symbolically points to the world ocean (Vedic samudra) encircling the center of the cosmos. In Indo-Iranian (Vedic and Avestan) cosmology, a similar concept appears: the world ocean surrounding the axis of the world –a mountain or tree at the universe's center. In Chinese legend, this center is the sacred Mount Kunlun (the counterpart of the Vedic Meru), to which the heavenly horse carries the chosen hero or emperor. The ascent to the summit of the world mountain is associated with obtaining the gift of immortality: in the Daoist–Han version, these are the peaches of immortality growing in the paradise of the goddess Xiwangmu on Kunlun, whereas in the Vedic tradition it is the gods' drink soma (amrita) drawn from the cosmic waters. The plots align in structure: the hero (or ruler) undertakes a journey from the margins of the cosmos (from the waters of chaos) to its center (the world mountain) to obtain the elixir of immortality –and the decisive role in this is played by the heavenly horse as vehicle and guide. Only thanks to the wondrous steed can one traverse the distance between earth and sky and reach the realm of the gods. In Han poetry, such a horse is praised as a being of divine nature, "opening distant gates" and "raising the body to Kunlun," that is, transporting its rider to the abode of the immortals. It is described with epithets like "bold and extraordinary spirit," "powerful and rare essence," underscoring that it is not merely an animal but a celestial messenger and mediator between worlds.

In Buddhist legends of Central Asia (the Khotan-Saka Jatakas), a heavenly horse is described carrying a king around the axis of the world: Mount Sumeru, situated at the center of the universe. It was believed that such horses dwelling on the summit of the world mountain (the land of the gods) served as intermediaries between the planes of existence. In the Hindu-Vedic tradition, the horse's role as a cosmic connector is reflected in the royal rite of Ashvamedha: the ritual horse is symbolically "tethered" to the world tree, united with the queen, and ultimately sacrificed, its body equated with the structure of the cosmos –thus sacred power and grace (farr, khvarenah) pass to the ruler. Among the Saka-Scythians, similar notions were expressed through the cult of the horse in chieftains' burials and coronation races, where the horse in effect occupied the center of the cosmos, affirming the king's authority. The common idea was that the axis mundi is materialized through the figure of the horse, and through it the earthly ruler receives the heavenly mandate. Thus, in both the East and West of Eurasia, the heavenly horse became a symbol of the path to immortality and of divine approval of power. Echoes of these ancient motifs are found much later as well: for example, Turkic folklore preserves legends of winged horses—Tulpar, faithful companions of batyrs—while in the Islamic tradition the wondrous horse Buraq is known as a vehicle of prophets. All of these embody a single archetype: a horse capable of crossing the boundaries of worlds, bringing the hero heavenly knowledge, strength, or salvation.

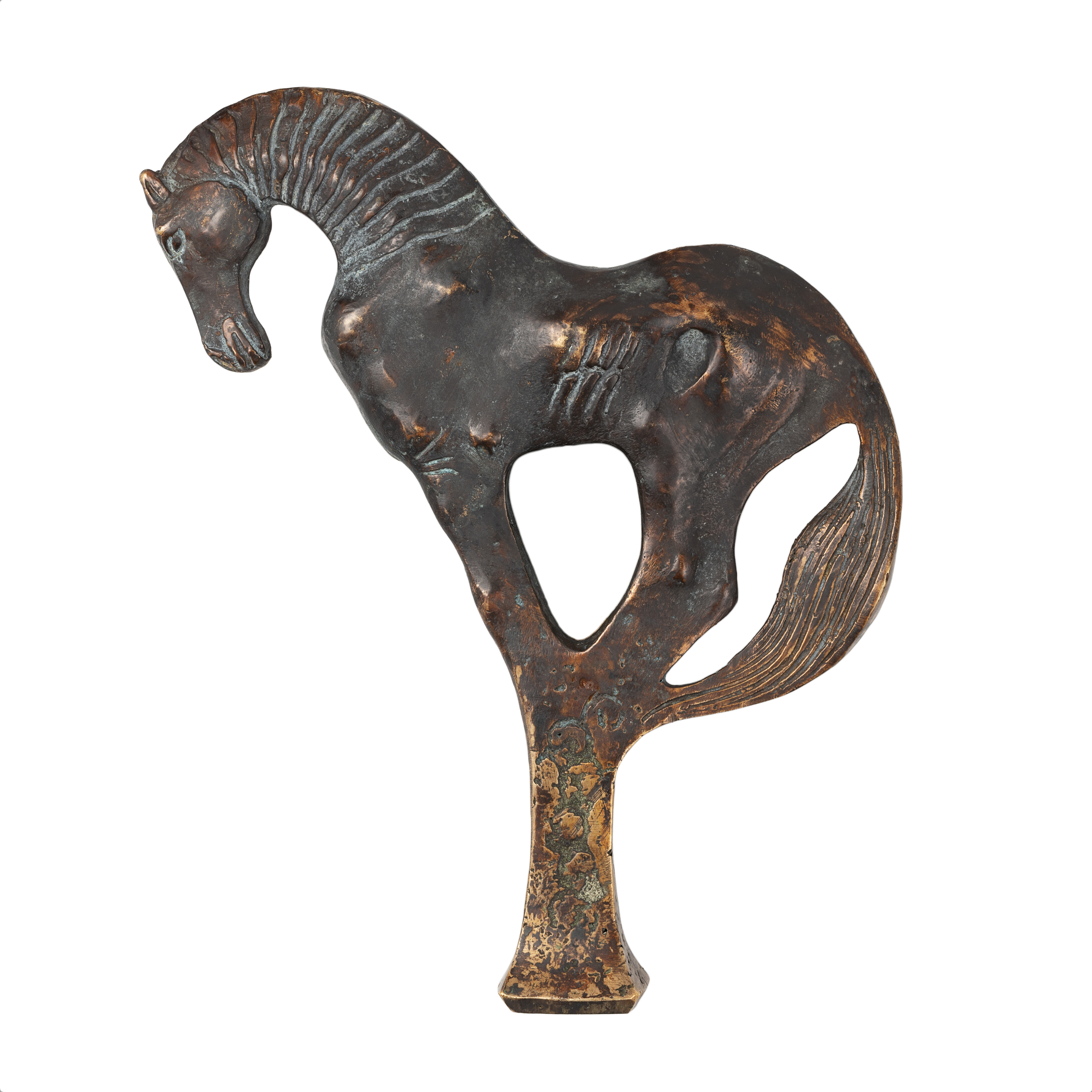
Saka ceremonial gilt bronze finial depicting a heavenly horse

== See also ==
- List of fictional horses
- Tulpar (IFV)
- Mouthwashing (video game), which takes place on a spaceship called Tulpar
- Wind horse, a similar equine in Tibetan mythology
- Emblem of Mongolia
- Coat of arms of Bashkortostan

== Bibliography ==
- Rémy Dor, Contes Kirghiz de la steppe et de la montagne, Publications orientalistes de France, 1983, 166 p. (ISBN 9782716901666)
- Gilles Veinstein, Les Ottomans et la mort, vol. 9 de Ottoman Empire and its heritage, BRILL, 1996, 324 p. (ISBN 9789004105058)
- Hervé Beaumont, Asie centrale: Le guide des civilisations de la route de la soie, Éditions Marcus, 2008, 634 p. (ISBN 9782713102288)
