= Emblem of the Kazakh Soviet Socialist Republic =

Versions
- Early version used between 1939 and 1978
- Armiger: Kazakh Soviet Socialist Republic
- Adopted: 26 March 1937
- Crest: Red star
- Supporters: Wheat
- Motto: Барлық елдеpдің пролетарлары, бірігіңдер! (Kazakh); Пролетарии всех стран, соединяйтесь! (Russian) ("Workers of the world, unite!")

The coat of arms of the Kazakh Soviet Socialist Republic was adopted on 26 March 1937 by the government of the Kazakh Soviet Socialist Republic. The coat of arms is based on the coat of arms of the Soviet Union.

It shows symbols of agriculture, two sheaves of wheat. The rising Sun stands for the future of the Kazakh nation, the red star as well as the hammer and sickle for the victory of Communism and the "world-wide Socialist community of states".

The banner bears the Soviet Union state motto ("Workers of the world, unite!") in both the Russian and Kazakh languages.

The acronym of the republic is shown in both the Russian ("КССР" KSSR) and Kazakh alphabets ("ҚKСР" QKSR (1939-1978), "ҚССР" QSSR (1978-1991)).

Since 1978, the sickle was placed over the hammer.

A new coat of arms of Kazakhstan was adopted following the dissolving of the Soviet Union on December 26, 1991, which retains many parts of the old Soviet one, including the star and the rising sun.

== History ==
=== Kirghiz Autonomous Soviet Socialist Republic ===
The emblem of the Kirghiz ASSR was described in the draft Constitution of the Kirghiz ASSR adopted on January 10, 1921 by the 4th All-Kyrgyz Congress of Soviets in Orenburg. The emblem was in common with the emblem of the Russian SFSR at that time. The only difference was the inscription on the emblem. Instead of the abbreviation Российская Советская Федеративная Социалистическая Республика, the inscription "Kyrgyz Socialist Soviet Republic of the Russian Federation" in Russian and Kazakh (in Arabic script) was used instead. The slogan "Workers of all countries, unite!" in Russian language was visible.

Whether the drawing of the emblem was created in accordance with this description is unknown, since the draft Constitution of the Autonomous Kirghiz SSR, like the constitutions of all other ASSRs adopted in the 1920s, was not approved by the All-Russian Central Executive Committee (VTsIK).

=== Kazakh Autonomous Soviet Socialist Republic ===
After the transformation of the Kirghiz ASSR to the Kazakh ASSR, there was a competition held for the emblem of the new ASSR. As a result of the competition, the artist Alexander Ivanovich Ivanov's project was recognized as the best and in 1927 the emblem of the Kazakh Autonomous Soviet Socialist Republic appeared with inscriptions in Russian, Kazakh and Karakalpak languages in the Arabic script: the inscription in Kazakh on top, and at the bottom in Karakalpak language.

On December 20, 1928, the Central Executive Committee of the Kazakh ASSR adopted a resolution to change the writing of Kazakh from Arabic script to the Latinized alphabet. In 1930, the Kara-Kalpak Autonomous Region was withdrawn from the KASSR. On the document of 1931 there is a seal of the Kazakh SSR without inscriptions.

In accordance with the new Constitution of the USSR adopted on December 5, 1936, the Kazakh ASSR was transformed into Kazakh SSR, whose constitution was adopted at the Extraordinary 10th Congress of Soviets of the Kazakh SSR, held from 21 until 26 March 1937.

=== Kazakh Soviet Socialist Republic ===
==== First version ====
December 5, 1936 was the adoption date of the new Constitution of the USSR, according to which the Kazakh ASSR was transformed into the union republic of Kazakh SSR. On March 26, 1937, the 10th Extraordinary All-Kazakh Congress of Soviets adopted the Constitution of the Kazakh SSR, article 121 of which contained a description of the coat of arms:

The state emblem of the Kazakh Soviet Socialist Republic consists of an image of a golden sickle and a hammer, placed criss-crossed, with handles down, on a red background in the sun and framed with ears, inscribed in Kazakh and Russian:" Workers of all countries, unite! " At the top of the emblem there is a five-pointed star, and in the lower part - the inscription "Kazakh SSR" in Kazakh and Russian languages.

— Constitution of the Kazakh SSR, Article 122

At that time, Kazakh language still use the Latin alphabet, so the inscription of the motto was "ВYKIL ÇER ÇYZINIꞐ PROLETARLARЬ, ВIRGIꞐDER!", rather than "Барлық елдеpдің пролетарлары, бірігіңдер!".

At the time of adoption of the Constitution, the design of the coat of arms of the Kazakh SSR did not yet exist and a contest for the best graphic image as described in the Constitution was announced.

May 16, 1937 the Union of Artists of the Kazakh SSR summed up the results of this competition, the best was the drawing of the coat of arms, made by the artists Cherkes and Nifontov (Nikiforov). At the same time, until 1951, there was a discrepancy between the description in the Constitution and the approved image of the emblem: instead of the inscriptions "Kazakh SSR", stipulated by the Constitution, in Kazakh and Russian in the arms on the tape were the abbreviations "QSSR" and "КССР".

==== Second version ====
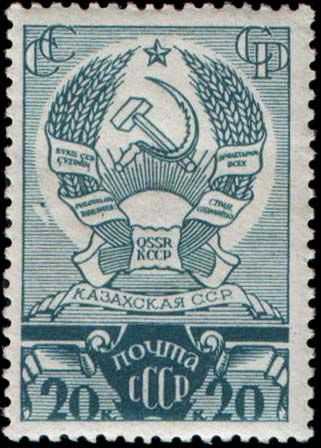
Emblem of the Kazakh SSR on a 1937 postage stamp

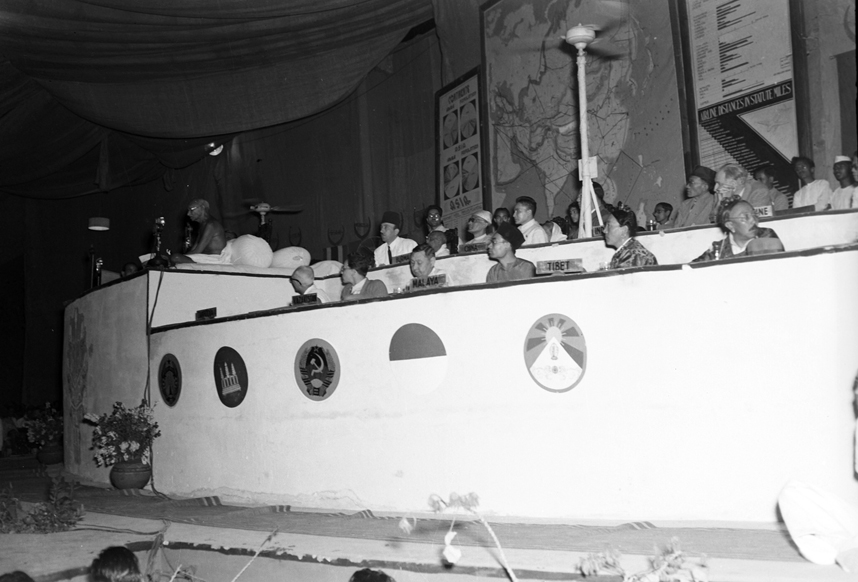
Soviet Kazakh Emblem (center) in 1947 Asian Relations Conference

Since 1937, the Kazakh SSR has been working on the replacement the Kazakh alphabet from the Latin alphabet into the Cyrillic alphabet. Even before the official replacement, the Presidium of the Supreme Soviet of the Kazakh SSR on January 28, 1939, through its Decree, amended the coat of arms by changing all the inscriptions in the Kazakh language in the Latinized alphabet on the inscription in the alphabet on the basis of the Russian alphabet. At the same time, the hammer began to be depicted superimposed on the sickle, and not vice versa, as it was before since 1937.

On November 10, 1940, the law of the Kazakh SSR was adopted on the replacement of the Kazakh script from the Latin alphabet into the Cyrillic alphabet. In 1951, the Constitution of the Kazakh SSR was amended, with the text in article 121 about the inscription on the coat of arms of the Kazakh SSR in Kazakh and Russian languages were changed to the words letters "ҚGGР" and "KССР". As a result of the approval of the provisions on the state emblem and the state flag of the Kazakh SSR in its arms, a red five-pointed star appeared a gold rim and a hammer began to be depicted superimposed on the sickle.

==== Third version ====
In 1978, the new Regulations on the State Emblem of the Kazakh SSR were adopted, according to which the sickle was again depicted as being superimposed on a hammer (as it was depicted in the coat of arms of the USSR and most of the Union SSR except for the Latvian SSR), the intensity of the red background was reduced, rays of the sun, an abbreviation in Kazakh "ҚGGР" was changed to "ҚССР".

== Gallery ==
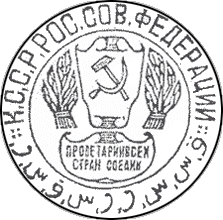
Coat of arms of the Kirghiz Autonomous Socialist Soviet Republic (1921–1925)

Coat of arms of the Kirghiz Autonomous Socialist Soviet Republic (1921—1925, modern reconstruction)

Coat of Arms of the Kazakh Autonomous Socialist Soviet Republic (1927–1937)

Emblem of the Kazakh Soviet Socialist Republic (1937–1939)

Emblem of Kazakh Soviet Socialist Republic (1939–1978)

Emblem of Kazakh Soviet Socialist Republic (1978–1991) and the Republic of Kazakhstan until 1992

== See also ==
- Flag of the Kazakh Soviet Socialist Republic
- Anthem of the Kazakh Soviet Socialist Republic
- Emblem of Kazakhstan
