= Madeniyet =

Madeniyet Rakhat
- Village
- Location in Kazakhstan
- Coordinates: 43°20′26″N 76°48′57″E
- Country: Kazakhstan
- Region: Almaty Region
- Time zone: UTC+6 (Omsk Time)

Madeniyet or Rakhat is a village in Almaty Region, in south-eastern Kazakhstan.
