= Lotte Rakhat =

Kazakhstani confectionery company

Lotte Rakhat JSC
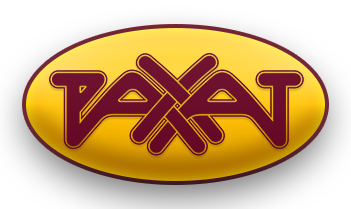
- Type: Joint-stock company
- Industry: Confectionery
- Founded: 1942
- Headquarters: Almaty, Kazakhstan
- Owner: Lotte Wellfood
- Number of employees: 4,500
- Website: www.rakhat.kz

Lotte Rakhat JSC (Kazakh: «Лотте Рахат» АҚ; Russian: АО «Лотте Рахат») is a confectionery company in Kazakhstan. It was founded as the Alma-Ata Confectionery Factory in 1942, using equipment evacuated from elsewhere in the Soviet Union during World War II. It renamed to Rakhat JSC in 1992 and took on its current name in 2021 following Lotte Wellfood's acquisition of nearly all of the company's shares. It has factories in Almaty (formerly Alma-Ata) and Shymkent, and sells its products both domestically and abroad.

== History ==
The Alma-Ata Confectionery Factory was established in 1942 at the site of an old distillery, with equipment that had been evacuated from Moscow and Kharkiv as a consequence of World War II. The factory became a joint-stock company named Rakhat JSC in 1992.

On 27 November 2013, the Kazakhstani government approved the acquisition of 76.25 percent of Rakhat's shares by the South Korean company Lotte Wellfood, then named Lotte Confectionery. This gave Lotte a controlling interest in Rakhat. Although Kazakhstani media reported a few months later that Lotte sought to buyout Rakhat entirely by acquiring the remaining shares, it was not until 2019 that Lotte increased its portion of shares to 92.44 percent, and then again to 95.57 percent. Rakhat's board of directors later voted in April 2021 to rename the company Lotte Rakhat JSC.

== Operations and products ==
Lotte Rakhat has factories in Almaty and Shymkent that together employ 4,500 people. As of 2022, the company produces over 400 different products, which are sold in Kazakhstan as well as in neighbouring countries, including Russia, China, Uzbekistan, Kyrgyzstan, Mongolia, Armenia, and Azerbaijan.

One of Lotte Rakhat's most popular products is the Kazakhstan chocolate bar, known for featuring the flag of Kazakhstan on its packaging. It is frequently purchased as a souvenir by tourists. On 13 July 2026, amendments to the law on Kazakhstan's state symbols came into effect, prohibiting the commercial use of the national flag. The amendments raised concerns that Lotte Rakhat would have to change the packaging of the Kazakhstan chocolate bar, but the Ministry of Culture and Information later clarified that the government would not pursue any such changes.

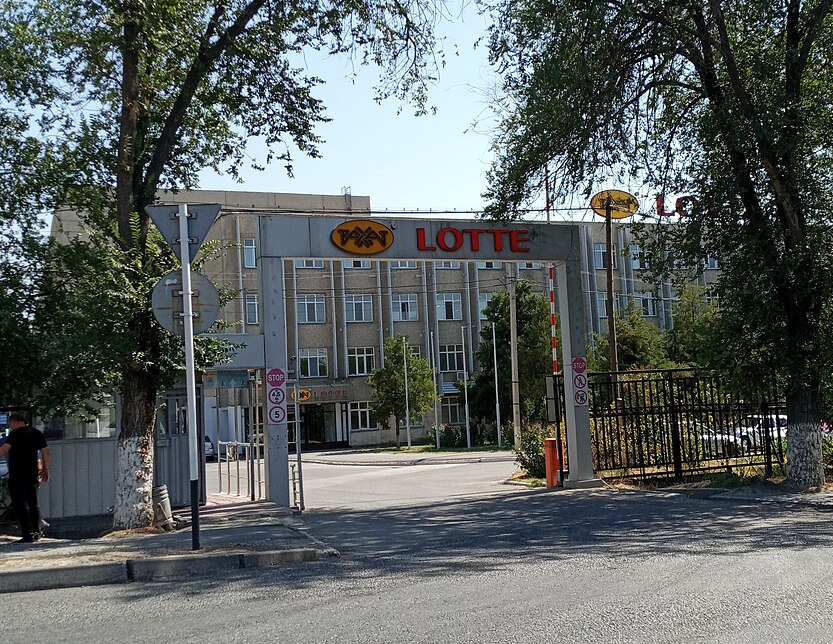
The Lotte Rakhat factory in Shymkent

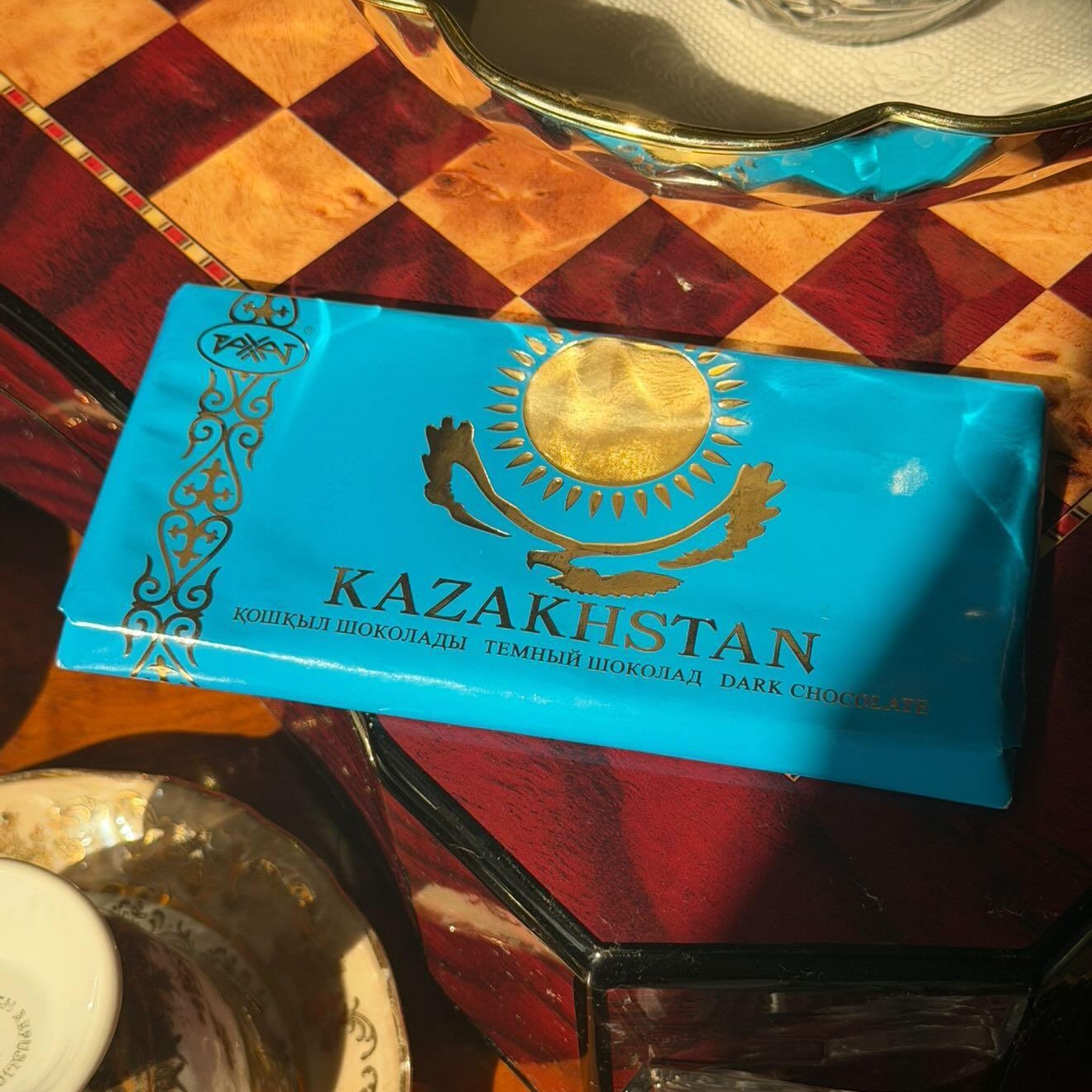
A Kazakhstan chocolate bar

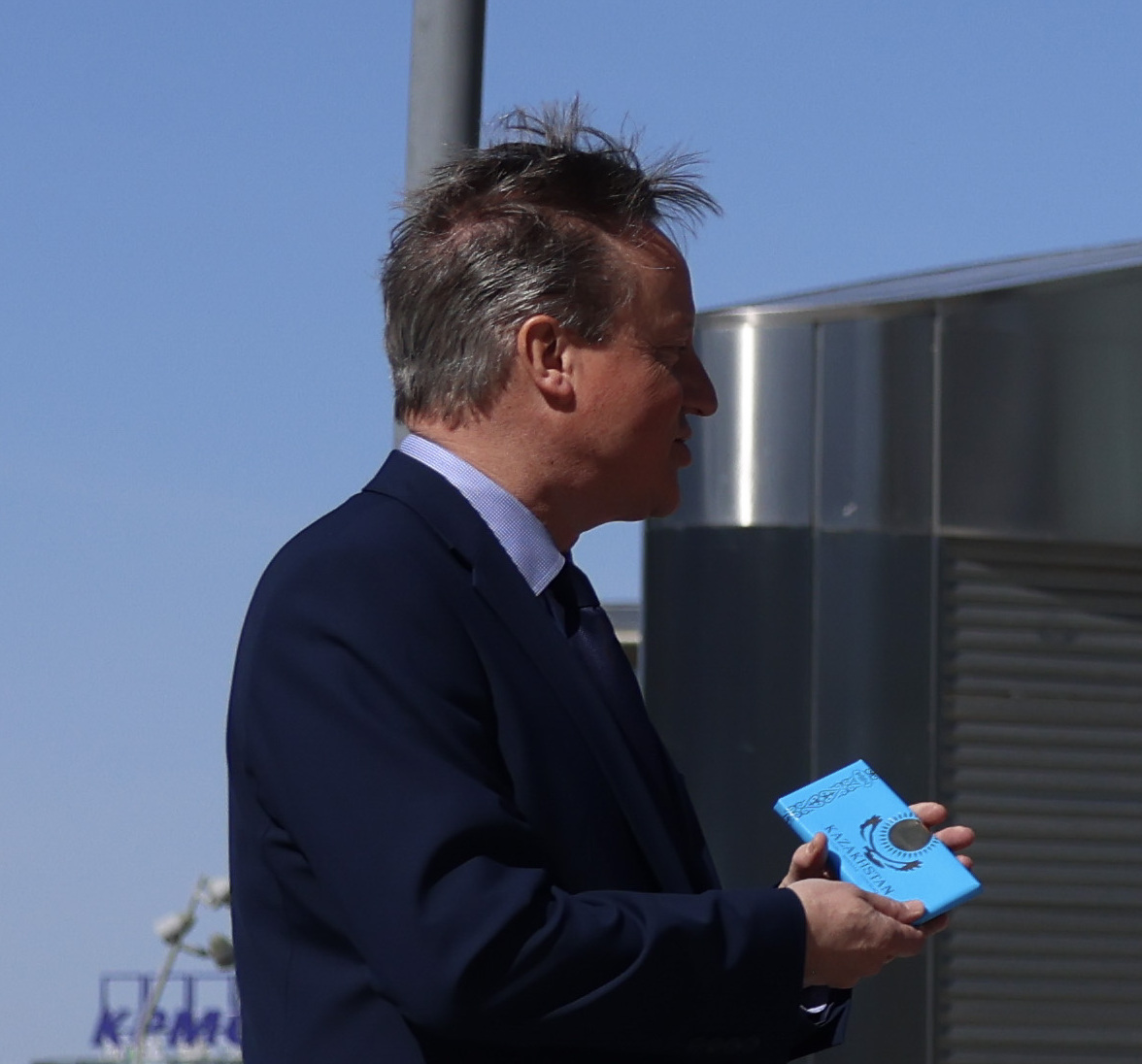
British Foreign Secretary David Cameron holding a Kazakhstan chocolate bar given to him by a Kazakh journalist, 25 April 2024

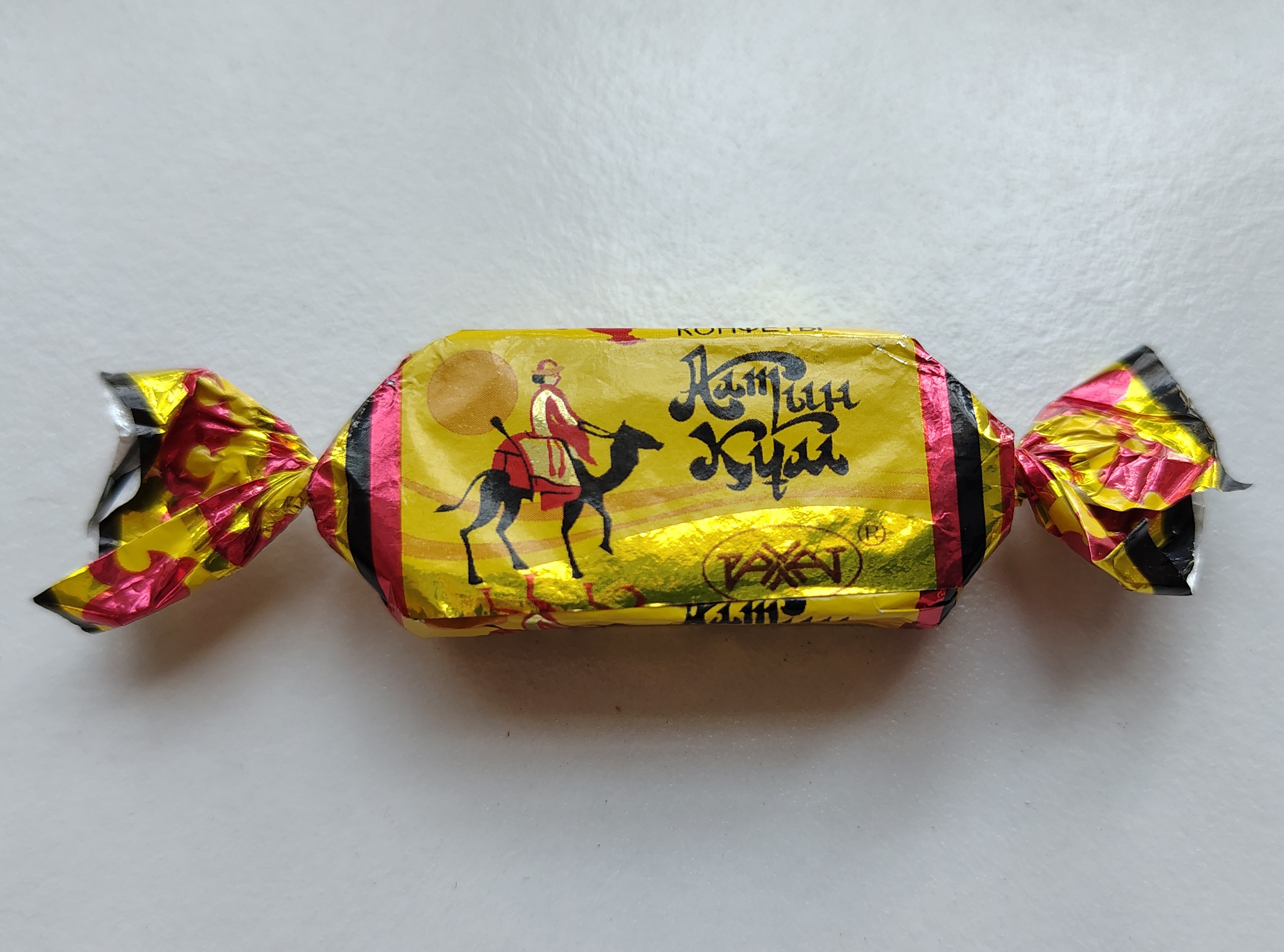
An Altyn Kum ("Golden Sands") chocolate praline
