= Flag of the Kazakh Soviet Socialist Republic =

Flag of the U.S.S.R. republic of Kazakhstan

Kazakh Soviet Socialist Republic
- Use: Civil and state flag, civil and state ensign
- Proportion: 1:2
- Adopted: 24 January 1953
- Relinquished: 4 June 1992
- Design: A red flag with a blue stripe (two-ninths) and a golden hammer and sickle and a gold-bordered red star in its upper canton.
- Reverse flag
- Use: Civil and state flag, civil and state ensign

The flag of the Kazakh Soviet Socialist Republic was adopted by the Kazakh government on 24 January 1953. The flag resembles the flag of the Soviet Union in defaced form with a 2/9 horizontal blue (azure) bar in the lower part of the flag and the hammer and sickle in the near centre.

== History ==
Between 1937 and the adoption of the above flag in 1940, the flag was red with a gold hammer and sickle in the top-left corner, with the Latin characters QAZAQ SSR and the Cyrillic characters КАЗАХСКАЯ ССР (KAZAKHSKAYA SSR) in gold in a sans-serif font beneath the hammer and sickle.

The second flag was red with the gold hammer and sickle in the top-left corner, with the Cyrillic characters Қазақ ССР (Qazaq SSR) and Казахская ССР (Kazakhskaya SSR) in gold to the right of the hammer and sickle was adopted on 10 November 1940 which adopted a law on the transfer of Kazakh writing in Russian alphabet charts, modified accordingly and the inscription on the emblem.

Flag of the Kazakh SSR (1937–1940)

Flag of the Kazakh SSR (1940–1953)

On 24 January 1953, the new flag of the Kazakh SSR was approved by the Decree of the Presidium of the Supreme Soviet of the Kazakh SSR. It was the flag of the Soviet Union; with the blue horizontal stripe at the bottom of the cloth. The width of the blue band is equal to 2/9 of the flag width, and the distance to it from the lower edge of the flag, 1/9 of the flag's width.

The regulations of the state flag of the Kazakh SSR was approved on 28 August 1981. It specified the proportions of the hammer and sickle and red star: the hammer and sickle are within a square side of the flag's width to 1/4 the length of the hammer handle - 3/4 of the diagonal of the square, the star fits into the diameter of a circle 1/8 of the flag width, distance of the vertical axis stars from the flagpole - 1/4 of the flag's width, the distance from the top edge to the center of the star - 1/8 of the flag's width.

The flag remained in use as the first flag of Kazakhstan until the new one was adopted on 4 June 1992.

Flag of the Kazakh SSR and Kazakhstan (1953–1992)

== Color scheme ==
Colors scheme	Blue	Red	Yellow
CMYK	100-25-0-7	0-100-100-19	0-15-100-0
HEX	#00B1ED	#CE0000	#FFD800
RGB	0-177-237	206-0-0	255-216-0

== See also ==
- Flag of the Soviet Union
- Coat of arms of the Kazakh SSR
- Flag of Kazakhstan
