= Emblem of Kazakhstan =

Versions
- non-3D version as used on presidential standard
- Armiger: Kazakhstan
- Adopted: 4 June 1992; (original Cyrillic version); 1 November 2018; (current Latin version)
- Crest: Pentagonal star
- Shield: Şañyraq
- Supporters: Tulpar
- Motto: QAZAQSTAN

The emblem of Kazakhstan (Kazakh: Қазақстан елтаңбасы, romanized: Qazaqstan eltañbasy; Russian: герб Казахстана, romanized: gerb Kazakhstana) was adopted on 4 June 1992. The designers of the emblem are Jandarbek Melibekov and Shot-Aman Ualikhan. About 245 projects and 67 description designs of the future arms took part in the final competition. Like other post-Soviet republics whose symbols do not predate the October Revolution, the current emblem retains some components of the Soviet one, in this case, rising sun rays and star. Prior to 1992, Kazakhstan had an emblem similar to all other Soviet Republics.

== Overview ==
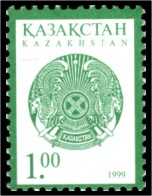
1999 Kazakh stamp featuring the Emblem of Kazakhstan

The emblem is an image of a shanyrak (Kazakh: Шаңырақ, Şañyraq; more often seen in the Russian transcription, Шанырак, shanyrak), the upper dome-like portion of a yurt, against a sky blue background which irradiates (in the form of sun rays) uyks (supports) set off by wings of mythical horses, inspired by Tulpar, which represent bravery. The circle shape of the emblem is a symbol of life and eternity. The shanyrak symbolizes family well-being, peace and calmness.

A design very similar to the Kazakh shanyraq is used in the flag of neighbouring Kyrgyzstan; it is known as tunduk in Kyrgyz.

The colour version of the national emblem of the Republic of Kazakhstan consists of two colours: gold and sky blue. The golden colour corresponds to the bright, clear future of the Kazakh people, and the blue sky colour is a symbol of aspiration for peace, consent, friendship and unity with all people.

The name of the country in Kazakh, QAZAQSTAN, is in the lower part of the emblem. The name was in the Cyrillic script (ҚA3AҚCTAH) before the national standard of the emblem of Kazakhstan was amended on 1 November 2018.

In March 2024, President Kassym-Jomart Tokayev announced that the emblem would soon be changed because of its complicated and "Soviet-like" design. The new emblem will be decided through a contest.

== Gallery ==
Coat of arms of Turgay Oblast (1868–1920)

Coat of arms of Ural Oblast (1868–1920)

Coat of arms of Akmolinsk Oblast (1868–1920)

Coat of arms of Semipalatinsk Oblast (1854–1920)

Coat of arms of the Kirghiz Autonomous Socialist Soviet Republic (1921–1925)

Coat of arms of the Kazakh Autonomous Socialist Soviet Republic (1927–1937)

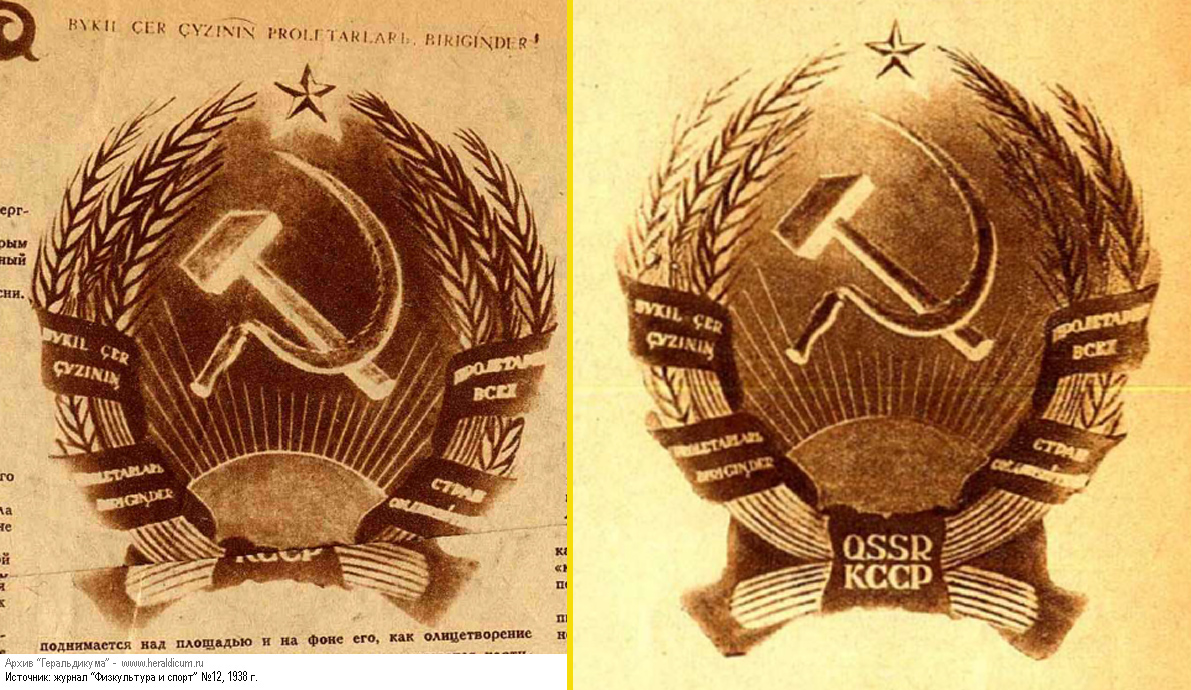
Emblem of the Kazakh Soviet Socialist Republic (1937–1939)

Emblem of Kazakh Soviet Socialist Republic (1939–1978)

Emblem of Kazakh Soviet Socialist Republic (1978–1991) and the Republic of Kazakhstan (1991–1992)

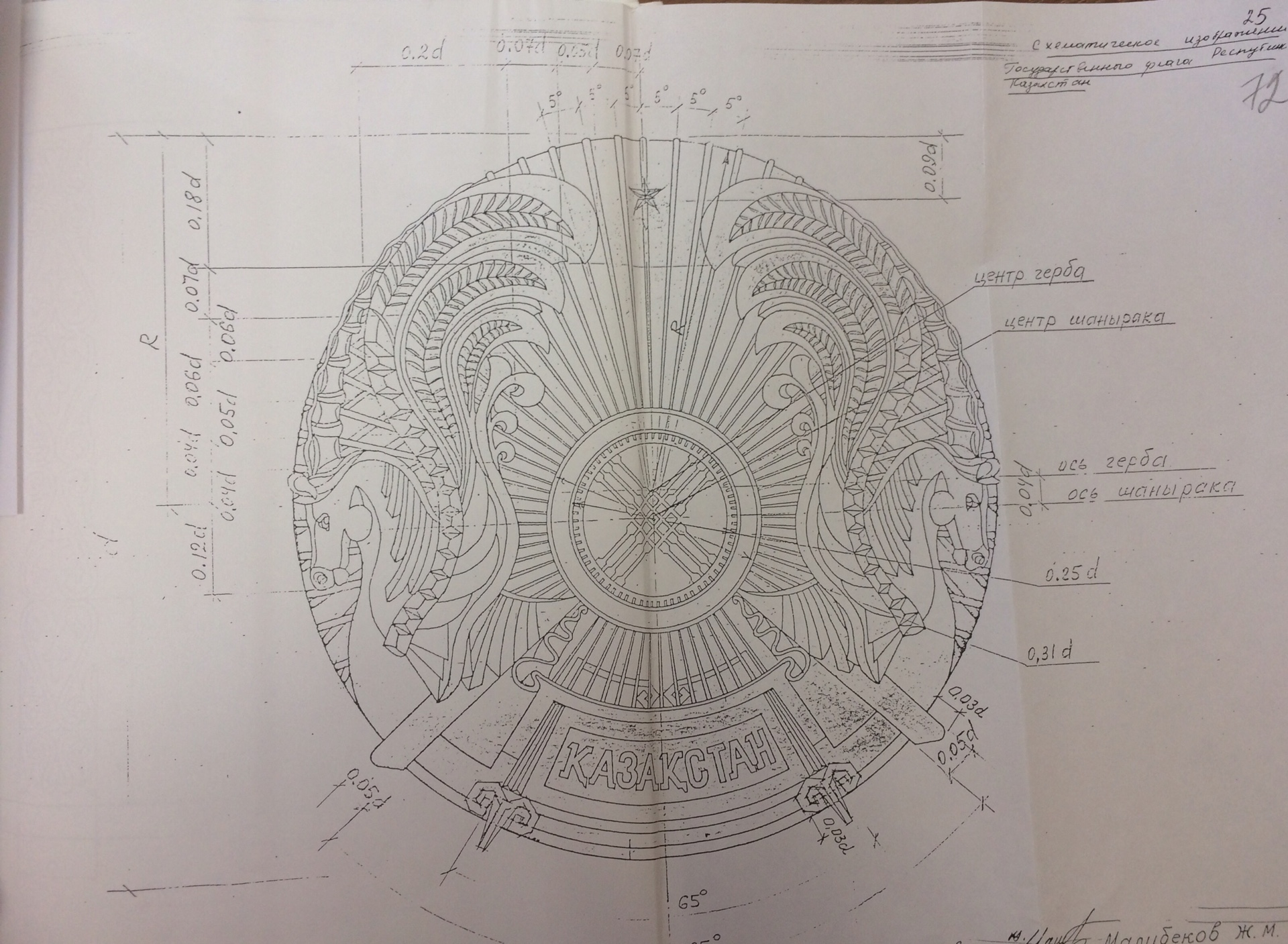
The design of the emblem in 1992

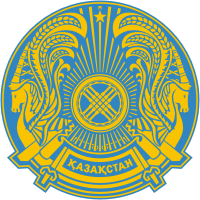
Emblem before introduction of national standard, 1996

Official rendering in national standard, 1992–2014

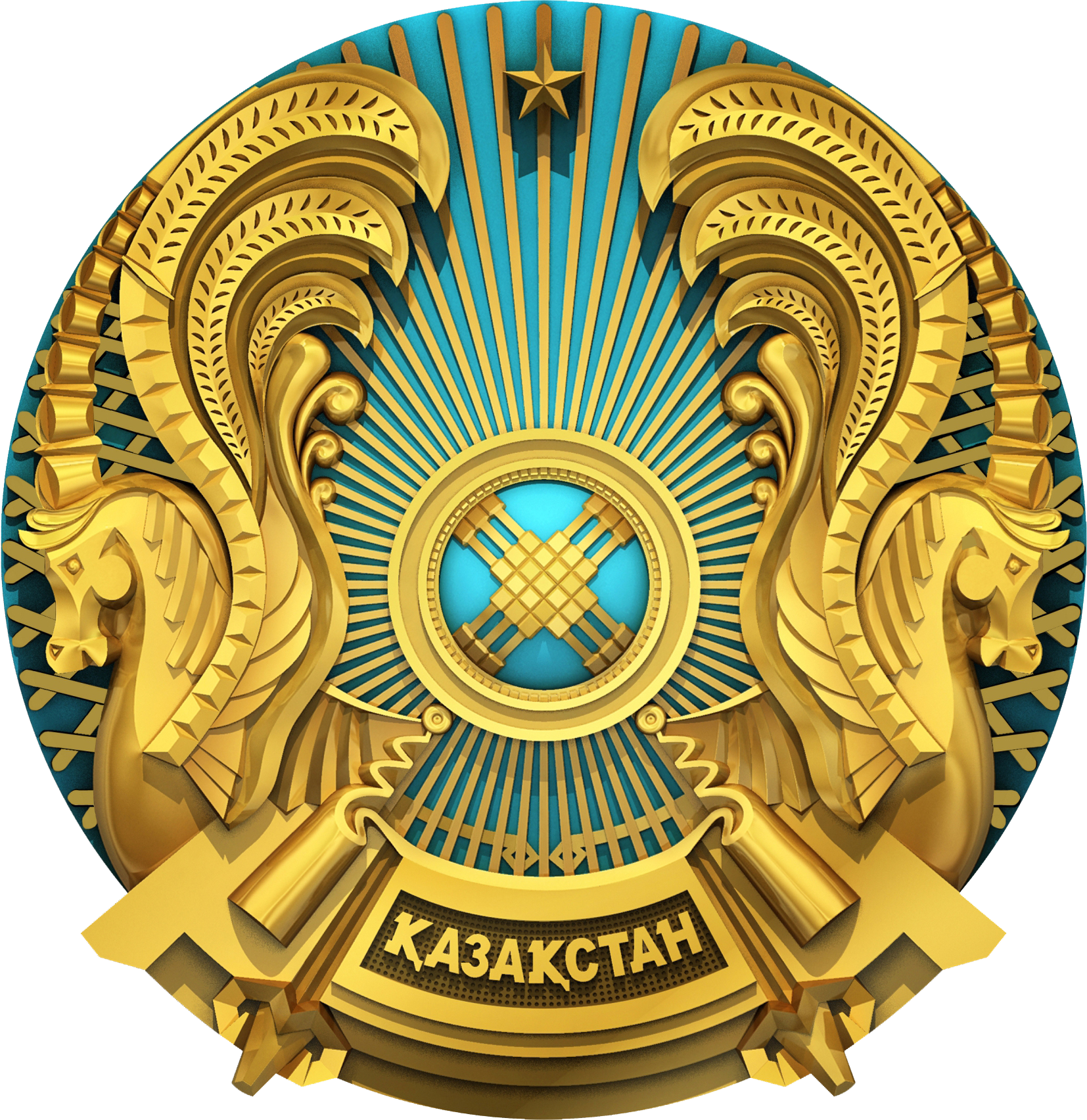
Official 3D rendering in national standard, 2014–2018

== See also ==
- Emblem of the Kazakh Soviet Socialist Republic
- Flag of Kazakhstan
- Armorial of sovereign states
