= Shaken Niyazbekov =

Kazakh artist (1938–2014)

Şäken Niazbekov
- Шәкен Ниязбеков
- Born: 12 November 1938; Taraz, Kazakh SSR, Soviet Union
- Died: 16 August 2014 (aged 75); Almaty, Kazakhstan

Şäken Oñlasynūly Niazbekov (Note: Often transliterated as Shaken Onlasynovich Niyazbekov through a Russified Romanization of Шакен Онласынович Ниязбеков.) (Note: Kazakh pronunciation: [ʃækʰʲén woŋɫɑsə̆nʊɫə́ nijɑzb̥ʲékʰəf]) (Kazakh: Шәкен Оңласынұлы Ниязбеков; 12 November 1938 – 16 August 2014) was a Kazakh artist who designed the flag of Kazakhstan.

Niazbekov was born on 12 November 1938 in Dzambul (present-day Taraz). Following secondary school, he entered Leningrad art-industrial college. While studying in this college, he participated in restoration works in the Hermitage, Saint Isaac's Cathedral and Petrodvorets.

Niazbekov's project of the national flag of Kazakhstan was chosen among more than 600 proposals.
