= Flag of Kazakhstan =

Republic of Kazakhstan
- Qazaqstan Respublikasynyñ memlekettık tuy (Kazakh)
- Use: National flag and civil ensign
- Proportion: 1:2
- Adopted: 4 June 1992; 34 years ago
- Design: A gold sun with 32 rays above a soaring golden steppe eagle, both centred on a turquoise field. The hoist side displays a national ornamental pattern "qoşqar-müiız"
- Designed by: Shaken Niyazbekov

The State Flag of the Republic of Kazakhstan (Note: Kazakh: Қазақстан Республикасының мемлекеттiк туы, romanized: Qazaqstan Respublikasynyñ memlekettık tuy; Russian: Государственный флаг Республики Казахстан, romanized: Gosudarstvennyj flag Respubliki Kazahstan) is a turquoise banner consisting of a 32-ray gold sun above a soaring golden steppe eagle, with the hoist side displaying a national ornamental pattern "qoşqar-müiız". It was adopted on 4 June 1992, designed by Shaken Niyazbekov, and replacing the Soviet-era flag.

== Description ==
Construction sheet

The national flag of the Republic of Kazakhstan has a gold sun with 32 rays (representing the 32 ethnicities of the Turkic people) above a soaring golden steppe eagle, both centred on a turquoise background; the hoist side displays a national ornamental pattern called "koshkar-muiz" (the horns of the ram) in gold; the blue colour is of religious significance to the Turkic peoples of the country, and so symbolizes cultural and ethnic unity; it also represents the endless sky as well as water. The gold and blue colours also evoke the former Soviet flag, reusing the gold from the hammer and sickle, and the shade of blue from the turquoise bar at the bottom of that flag. The sun, a source of life and energy, exemplifies wealth and plenitude; the sun's rays are shaped like grain, which is the basis of abundance and prosperity; the eagle has appeared on the flags of Kazakh tribes for centuries and represents freedom, power, and the flight to the future. The width of the flag to its length is 1:2.

Colour Scheme	Celestial blue	Canary Yellow
Pantone	3125U	102U
RGB	0-171-194	255-236-45
Hexadecimal	#00ABC2	#FFEC2D
CMYK	94% – 0% – 19% – 0%	0% – 0% – 100% – 0%

== History ==
=== Central Asian Revolt ===
Flag of Amankeldy İmanov's associates who rebelled in 1916

In 1916, Russia required Muslim people of Central Asia to join Russian military forces. Opposition to the Russian colonial regime and economic instability led to the Central Asian Revolt of 1916. Amongst Kazakhs, Amankeldy Imanov was a leading figure in the revolts. He and his associates used a red flag with yellow text, a blue crescent moon in the top-left, and a blue bow, spear and an axe crossed on red background.

The text on the flag is in Arabic script, since Kazakh's writing system was Arabic prior to 1929. The text on the flag says: "Flag of warrior leader, Amangeldi batır" ("Batır" ("Батыр") means "a hero" in Kazakh).

=== Alash Autonomy ===
During World War I, Russia was exhausted as it was not ready for war. This was the reason for the food shortages, which occurred even in major cities like Petrograd. The first revolution, started because of an economic instability, led to the Russian ministers in charge of Central Asia to create the Alash party and found their own autonomy on territory of modern Kazakhstan.

The Alash state again lacked one agreed-upon flag, but the Autonomy had multiple proposed flags. Alikhan Bukeikhanov and Barlybek Syrtanov proposed a flag with green, yellow, red stripes and white crescent with yellow star in top-left in the draft constitution of the "Country of the Kazakhs" (1911), however, there is not a single historical confirmation of the use of this flag by the Alash Orda (1917–1920). The direction of stripes is not mentioned. Sometimes people use the logo of Qazaq, the newspaper published by members of Alash, as a flag of the Autonomy. This variant of flag depicts a yellow yurt on a white background, this flag is mentioned in the "Will of the People" newspaper as approved on 6 June 1918.

Possible proposed flag of the Alash Autonomy
(1911)

Possible proposed flag of the Alash Autonomy
(1911)

Possible flag of the Alash Autonomy
(1918)

=== Soviet Kazakhstan ===
After the victory of the Bolsheviks in the Russian Civil War, The Soviets consolidated Alash into the newly forming Kazakh Autonomy, resulting in the establishment of the Kazakh Autonomous Socialist Soviet Republic in 1920. The first flag of the Kazakh ASSR consisted of two lines of yellow text in the canton, surrounded with a yellow line, reading "KSSR" (Kazakh SSR), and "R.F." (Russian Federation).

Kazakhstan was a part of the Russian Soviet Federative Socialist Republic until the 1937 establishment of the Kazakh Soviet Socialist Republic within the Union, and, subsequently, changed its flag. This flag had the hammer and sickle in the canton and the name of the republic in Kazakh and Russian under it. The Kazakh name was written in Latin, as the writing system of Kazakh changed in 1929 from Arabic to Latin.

In 1953, the Kazakh SSR made its final flag change, as part of a redesign by all the Soviet republics. This flag consisted of a hammer and a sickle with a star above it and a light blue horizontal stripe on a red background. It remained in brief use after Kazakhstan gained its independence in December 1991.

Flag of Kazakh ASSR
1920–1936

Flag of Kazakh SSR
1937–1940

Flag of Kazakh SSR
1940–1953

Flag of Kazakh SSR and Kazakhstan, obverse side
1953–1991, 1991–1992

Flag of Kazakh SSR and Kazakhstan, reverse side
1953–1991, 1991–1992

=== Republic of Kazakhstan ===
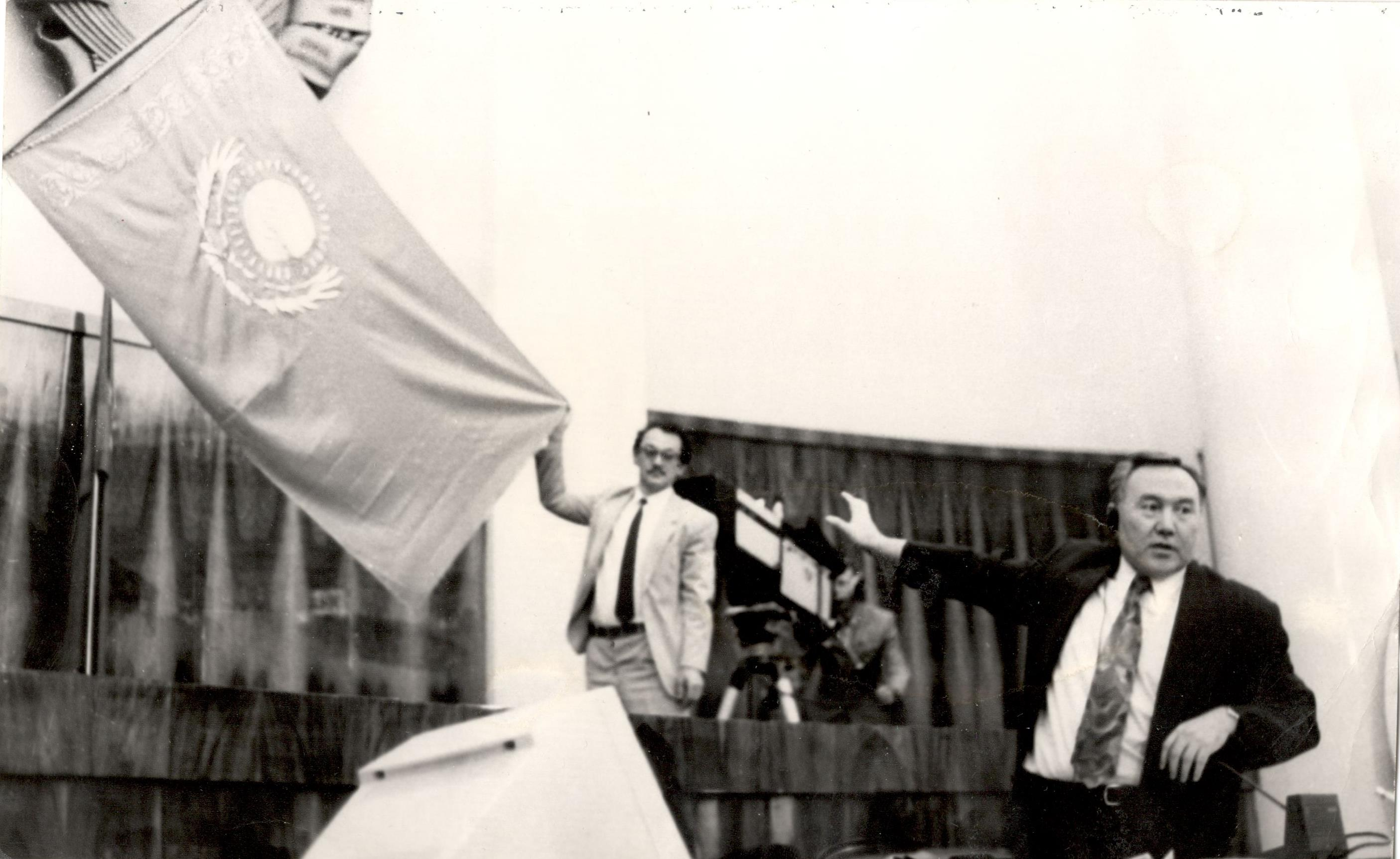
President Nursultan Nazarbayev presenting the prototype flag to the Supreme Soviet, 1992

Unlike other formerly Soviet nations, like Armenia, Azerbaijan, Belarus or Ukraine, Kazakhstan did not have an official flag before becoming part of the Soviet Union. Kazakhstan kept its Soviet flag up until 4 June 1992.

The Government of Kazakhstan organized a contest on 2 January 1992, which received several proposals. The designer of the current flag, Shaken Niyazbekov, had originally coloured the ornament red. This was changed in July 1992 to the current shade of gold.

Proposed flag by Şäken Niazbekov

Proposed flag depicting yellow circle with 8-pointed star in it, on blue background

Flag with green, yellow and blue vertical stripes

Flag with yellow, blue and red horizontal stripes and yellow crescent with stars

Flag depicting two squares with yellow outline forming 8-pointed star on a blue background

Flag depicting Shanyraq (the top of yurts) with crescent in centre and sun in the top-left

Flag with blue, white and green stripes and crescent with stars, which have a picture of a wolf in it

Flag with star and crescent in the canton, with a background of white, red and green stripes (the first being larger than the other two)

== Variants ==
Flag for the Kazakh armed forces, featuring a red star

Presidential standard, featuring the national emblem

== Gallery ==
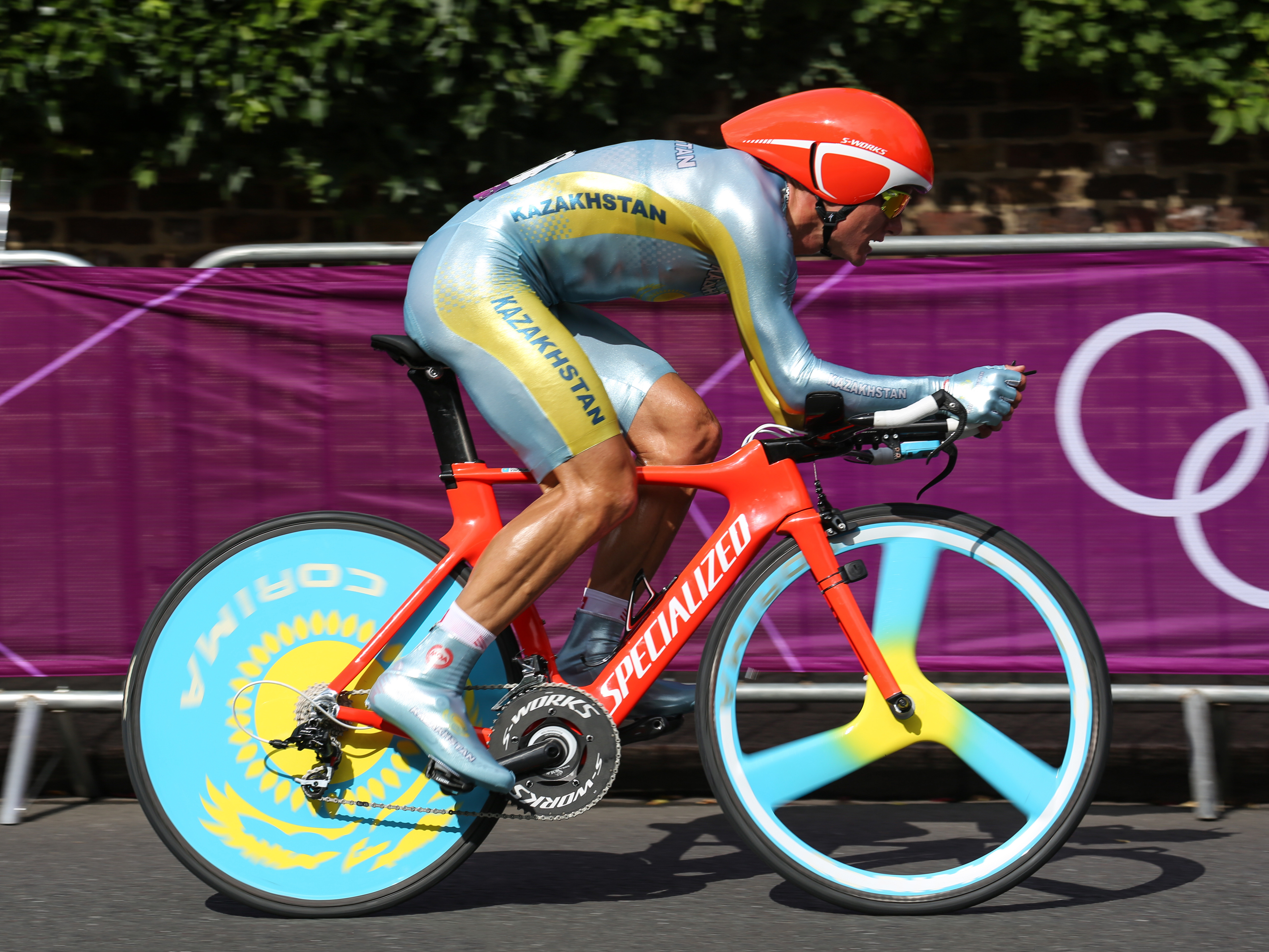
Alexander Vinokurov during the Men's cycling event at the 2012 Summer Olympics in London donning the Kazakh flags on rims

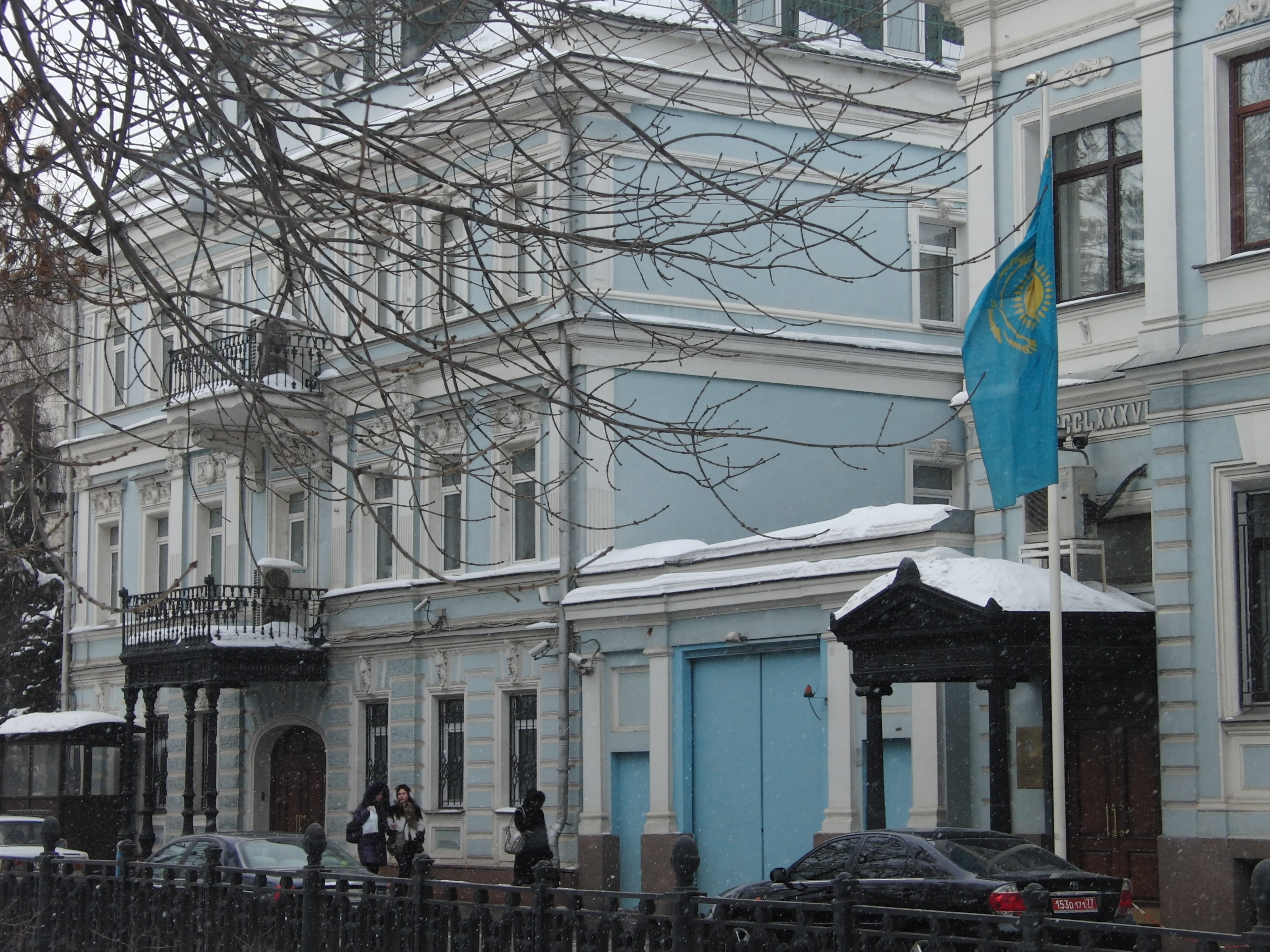
The Kazakh flag at Embassy of Kazakhstan in Moscow

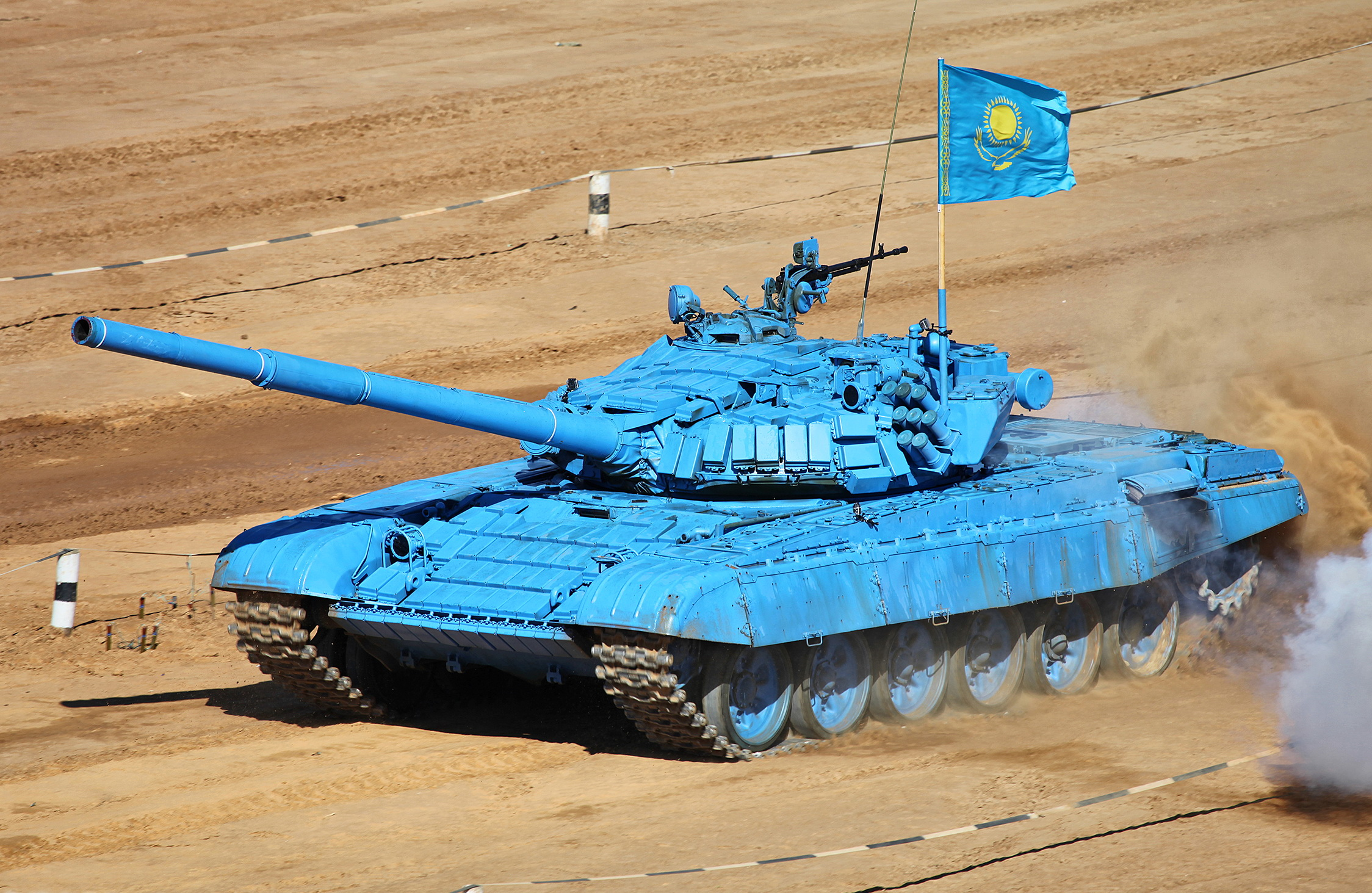
T-72 tank in the national colours

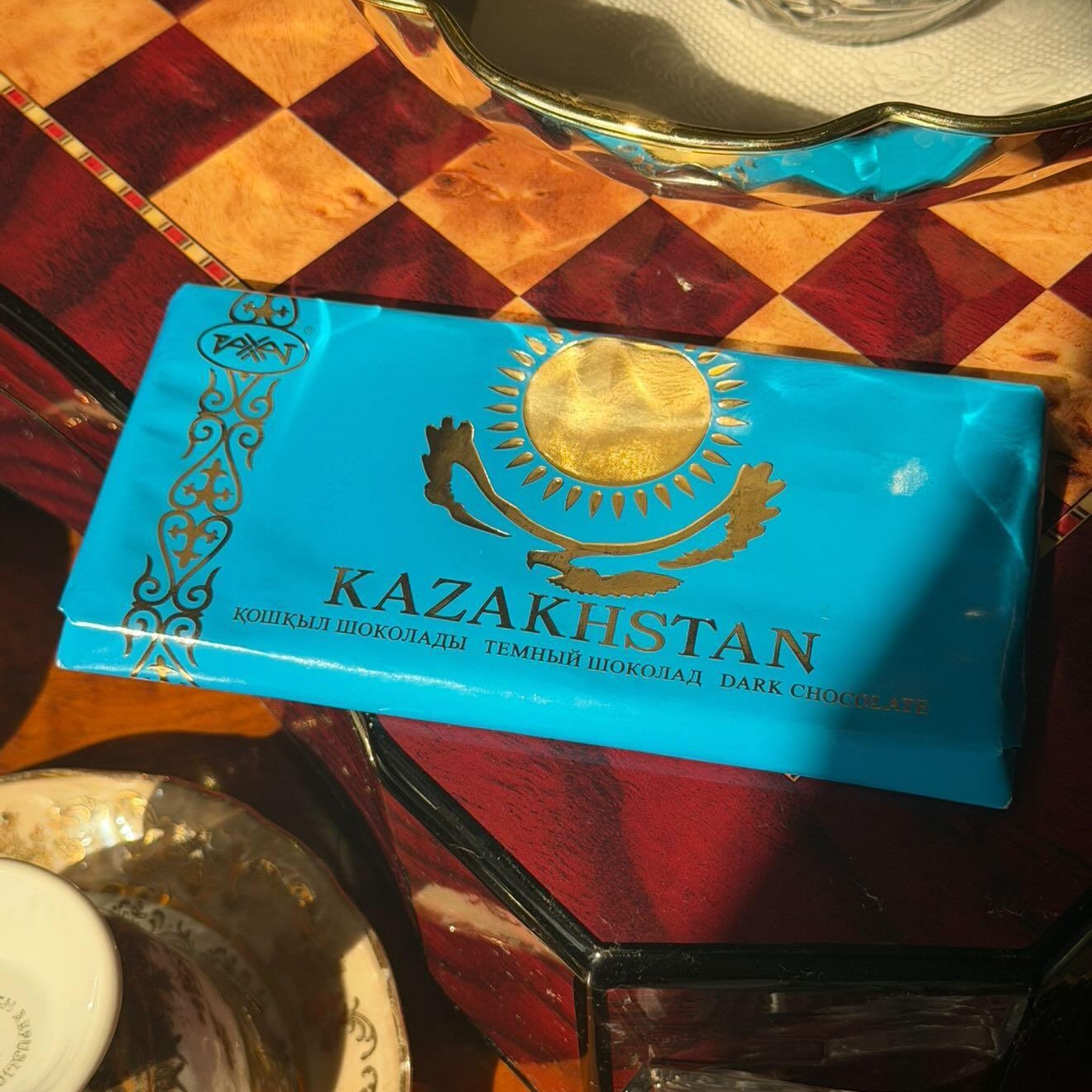
Lotte Rakhat chocolate bar depicting the Kazakh flag on the packaging.

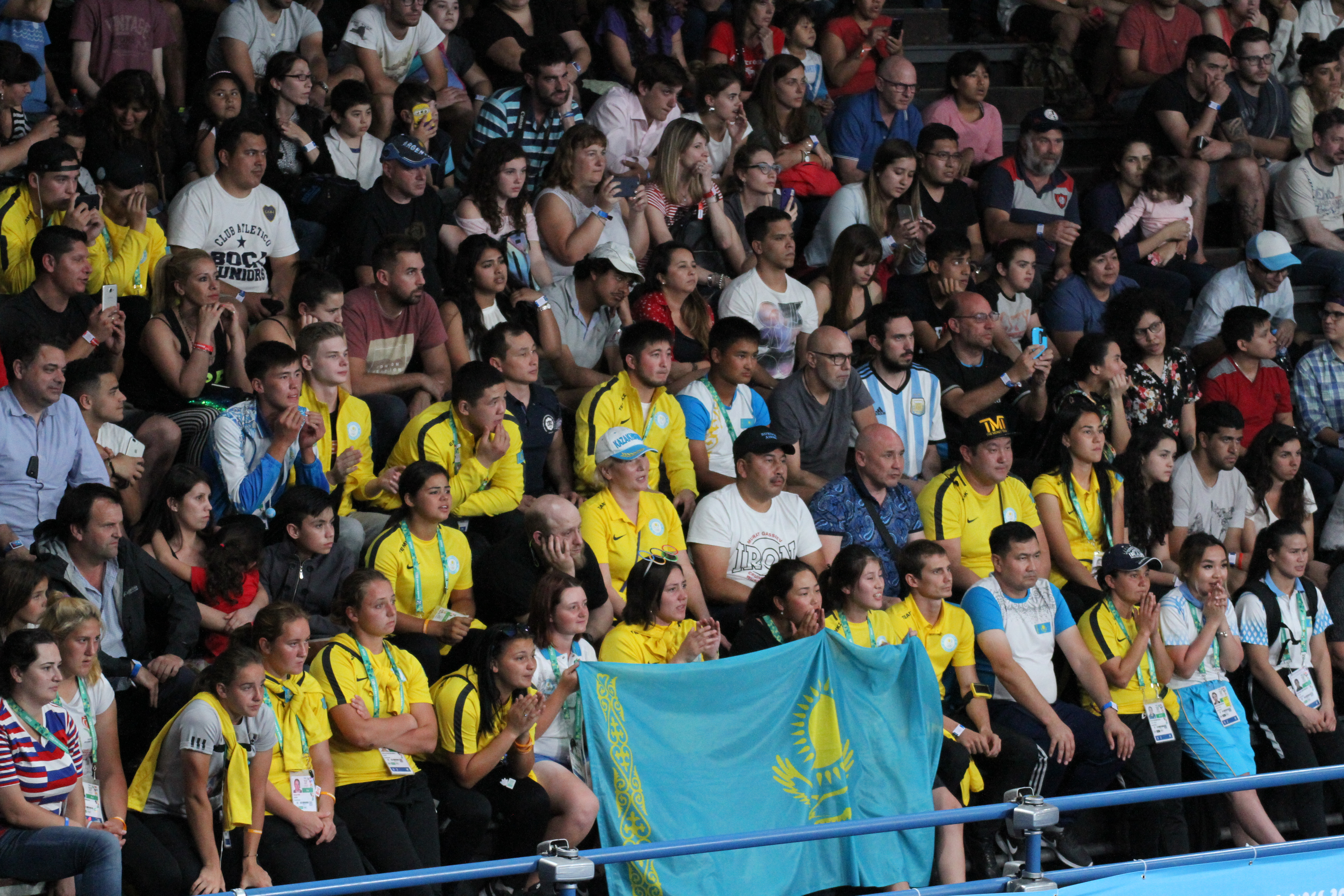
A crowd with the flag of Kazakhstan

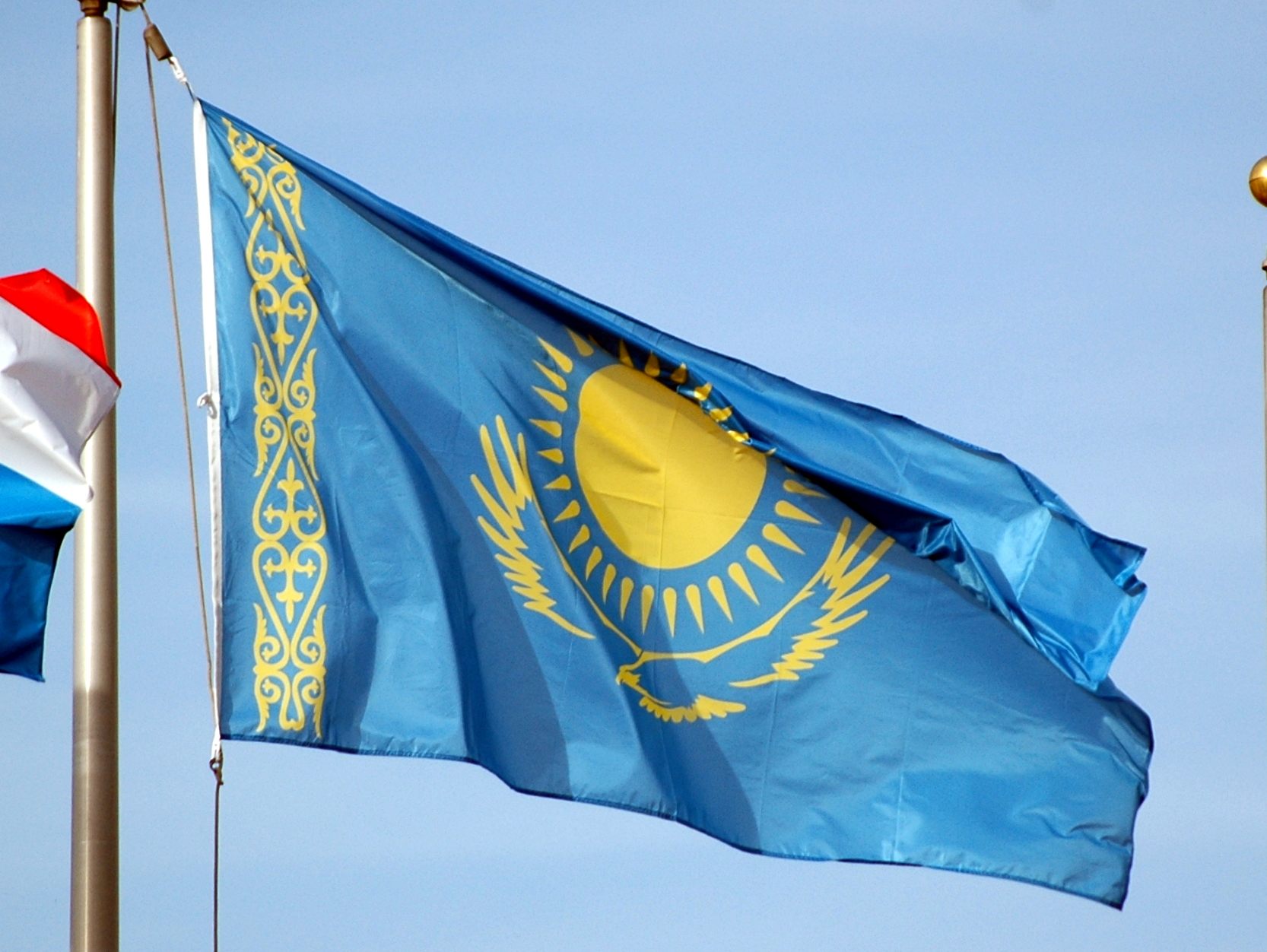
A flag of Kazakhstan flying

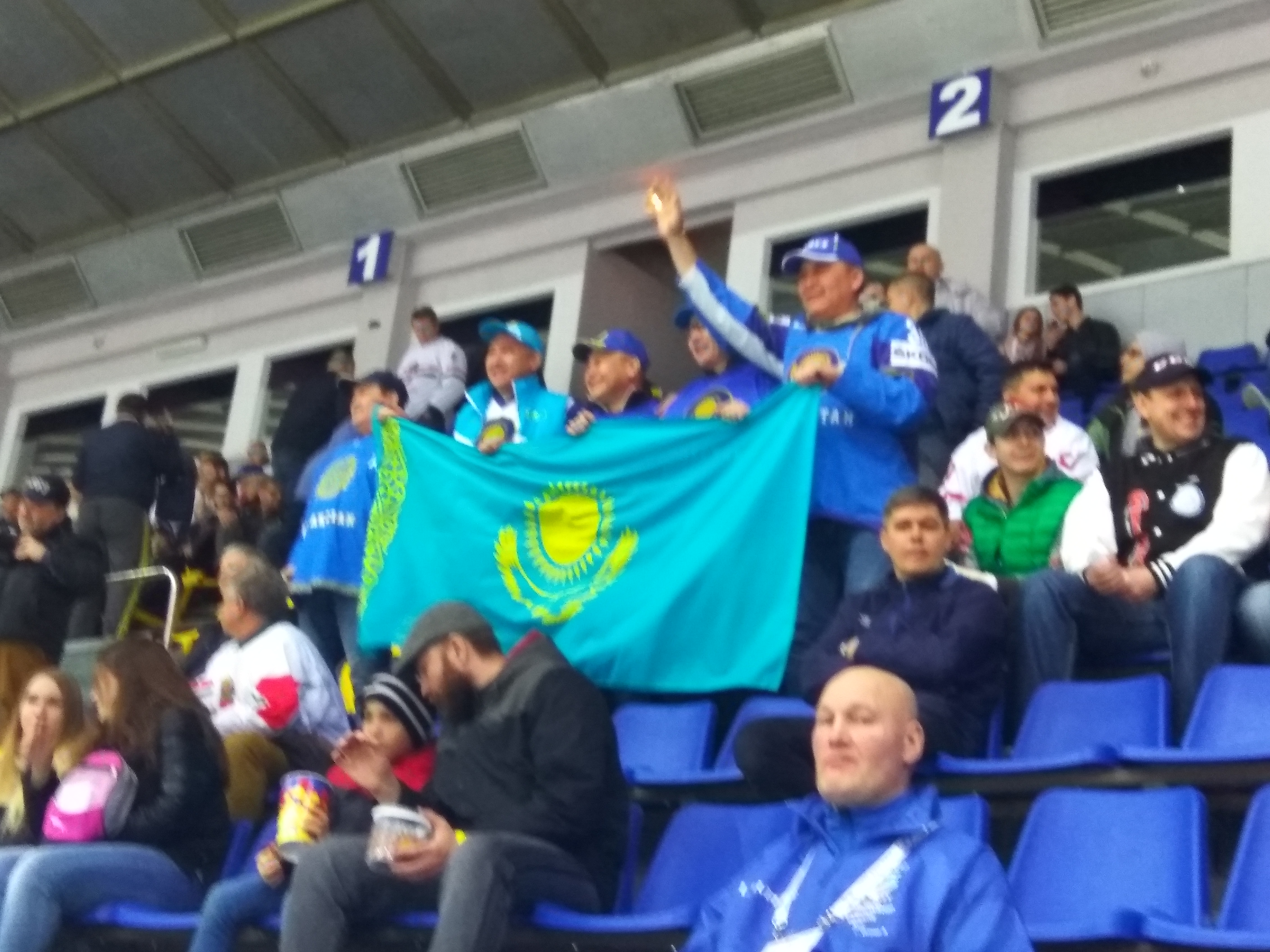
Spectators with the Kazakh flag

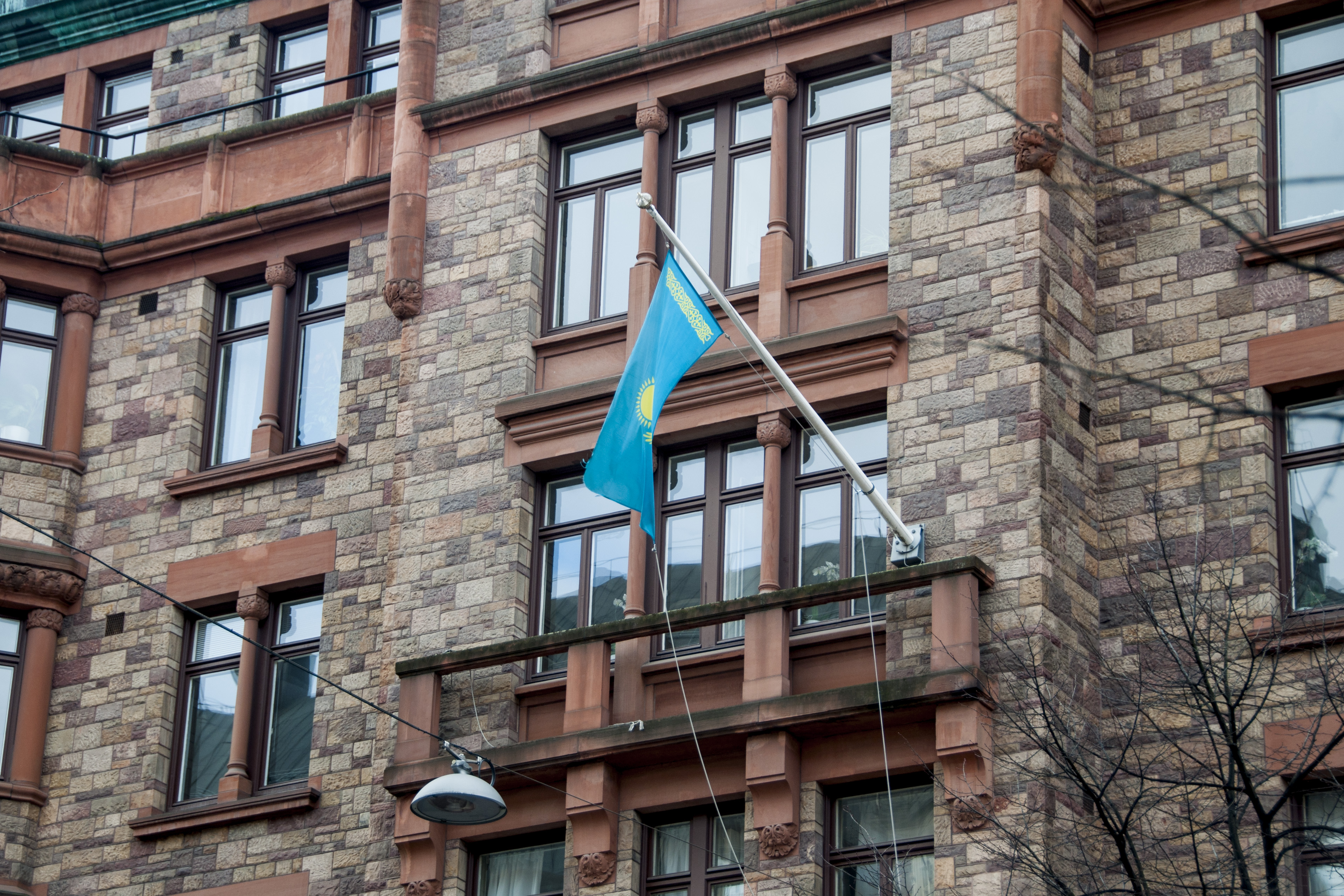
The flag of Kazakhstan hanging at the Kazakh Embassy in Stockholm

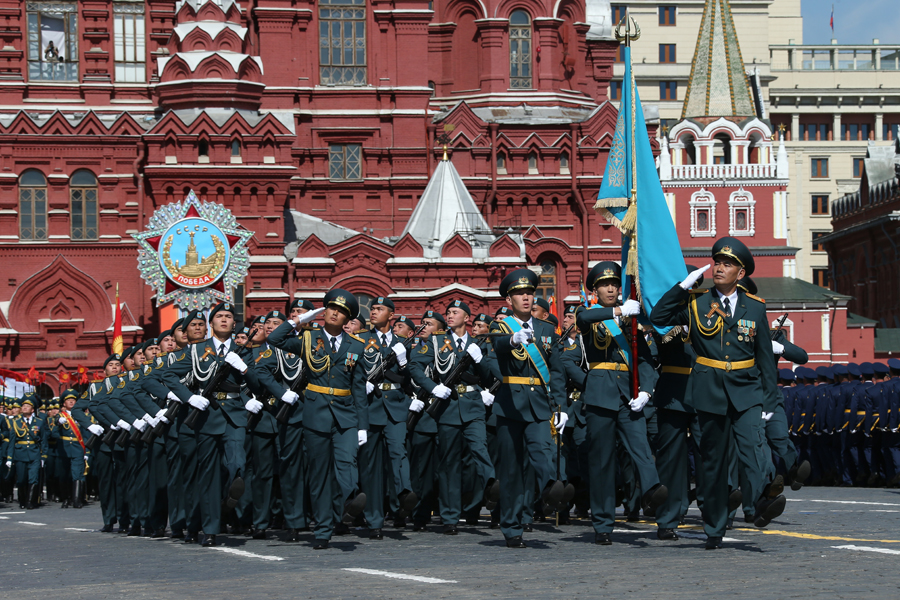
Kazakh contingent during the 2015 Moscow Victory Day Parade with the national flag

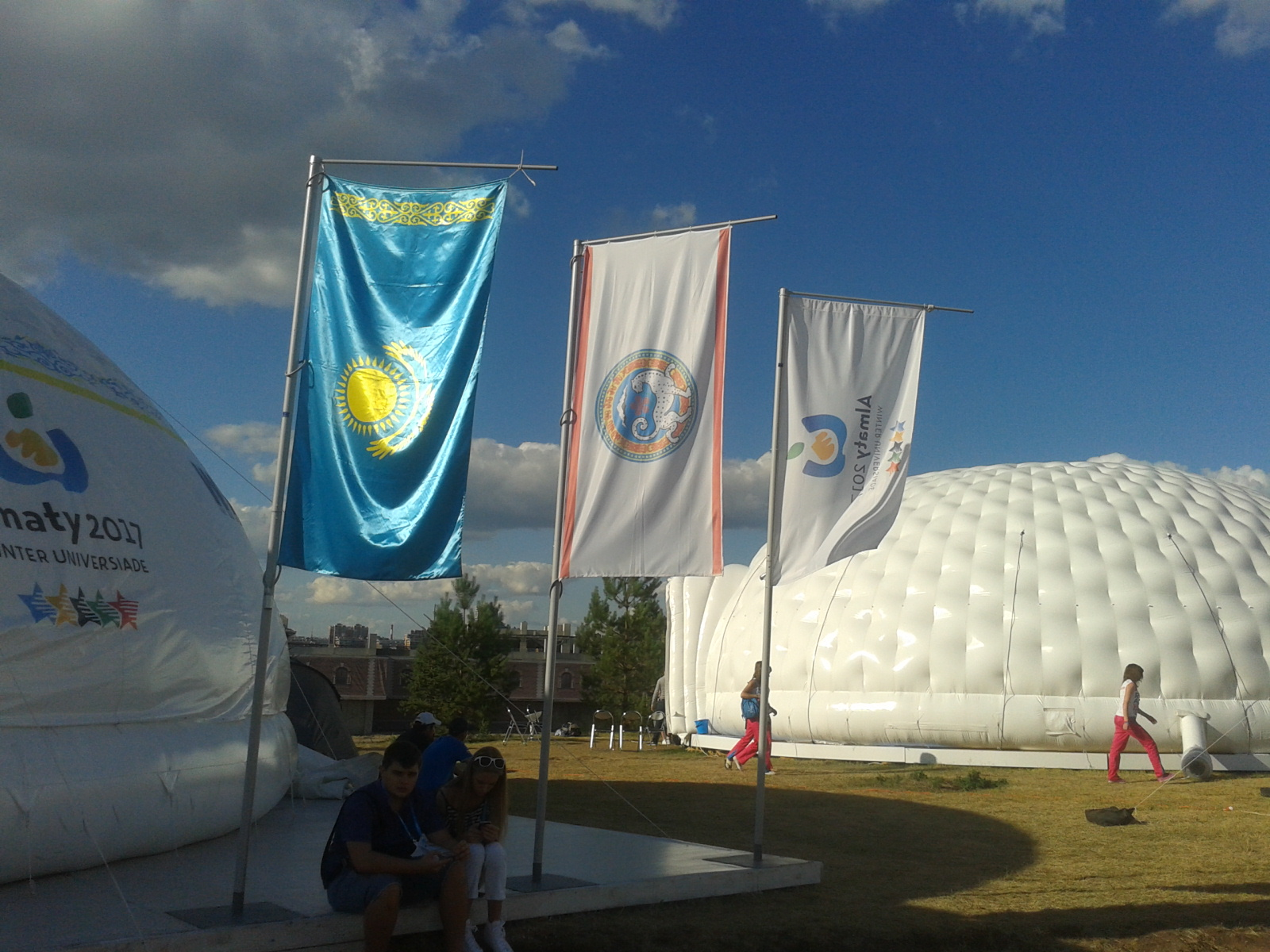
The national flag hanging vertically

Detail on measurement specifications

== See also ==
- Emblem of Kazakhstan
- Flag of the Kazakh Soviet Socialist Republic
- List of Kazakh flags
